= Tijmen Eising =

Dutch bicycle racer (born 1991)

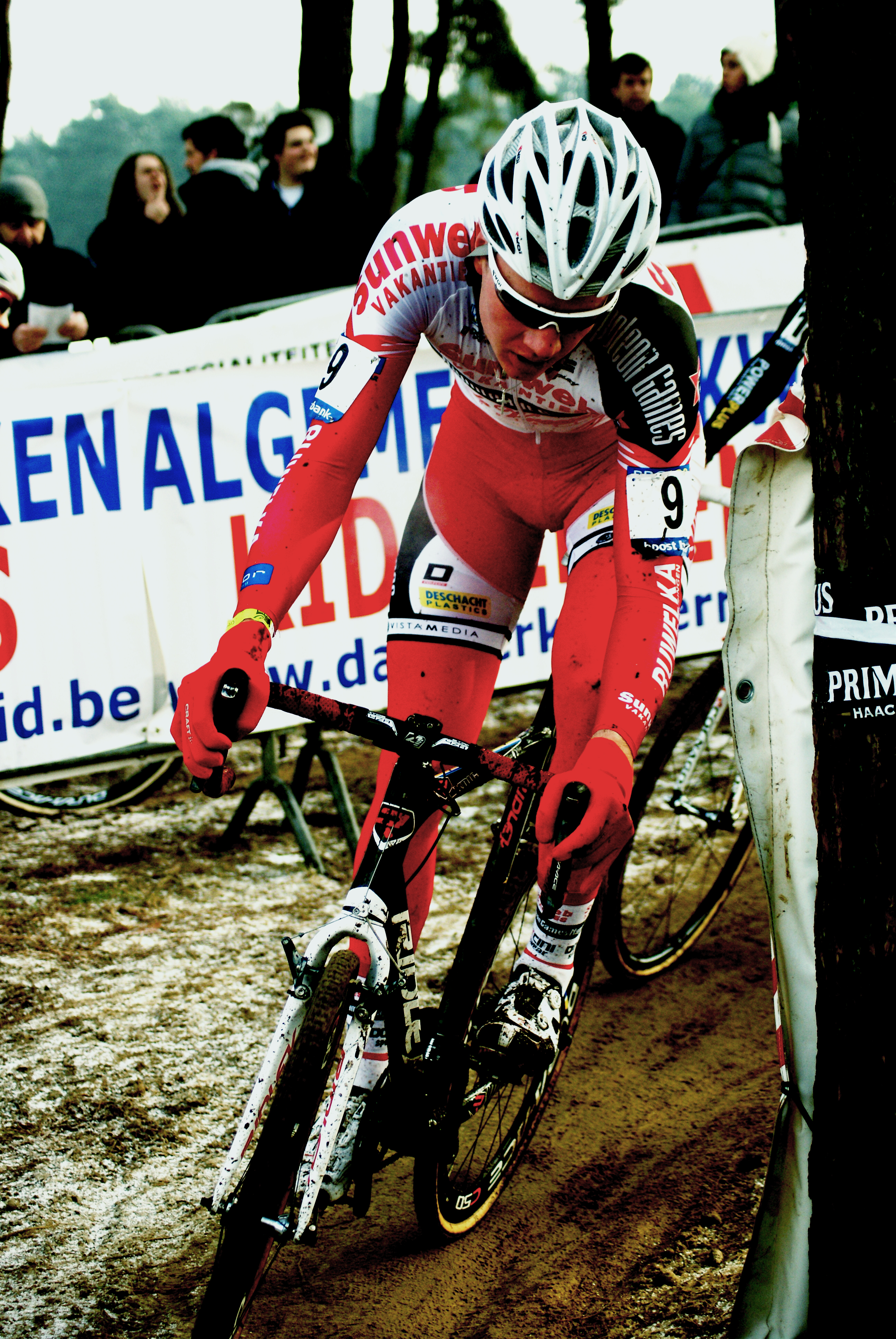
- Eising at the 2013 Krawatencross.

Personal information
- Born: 27 March 1991 (age 35) Emmen, Netherlands
- Height: 1.98 m (6 ft 6 in)
- Weight: 80 kg (176 lb)

Cycling career
- Sport: Cycling
- Current team: BEAT CC p/b Saxo
- Disciplines: Road; Cyclo-cross
- Role: Rider

Amateur team
- 2019: VolkerWessels–Merckx Cycling Team

Professional teams
- 2008–2009: Revor Cycling Team
- 2009–2013: Sunweb–Projob
- 2013–2018: Metec–TKH
- 2020–2023: VolkerWessels–Merckx Cycling Team
- 2024–: BEAT Cycling Club

Tijmen Eising (born 27 March 1991) is a Dutch cyclist, who currently rides for UCI Continental team BEAT CC p/b Saxo.

== Major results ==
=== Road ===
2008
5th Overall Valromey Tour
10th Overall Trofeo Karlsberg
2009
1st Stage 2 Trofeo Karlsberg
6th Road race, European Junior Road Championships
6th Overall Sparkassen Münsterland Tour
2010
3rd Road race, National Under-23 Road Championships
2011
4th Overall Carpathia Couriers Paths

1st Stages 2 & 4

6th Overall Tour of Malopolska

1st Stage 1

2012
2nd Slag om Norg
2013
2nd Slag om Norg
2014
1st Stage 1 (TTT) Czech Cycling Tour
3rd Dwars door Drenthe
7th Internationale Wielertrofee Jong Maar Moedig
2015
2nd Dorpenomloop Rucphen
9th Overall Volta ao Alentejo
2016
7th Ster van Zwolle
2017
1st Ronde van Groningen
3rd Ronde van Limburg
10th Profronde van Noord-Holland
2020
1st Ronde van Groningen
2021
1st Stage 1 (TTT) Okolo Jižních Čech
2024
4th Arno Wallaard Memorial
6th Ster van Zwolle

=== Cyclo-cross ===
2007–2008
1st National Junior Championships
Junior Superprestige

1st Vorselaar
2nd Gieten
2nd Diegem
2nd Veghel-Eerde

UCI Junior World Cup

2nd Hofstade
3rd Milan

2008–2009
1st UCI Junior World Championships
1st UEC European Junior Championships
1st Overall UCI Junior World Cup

1st Tábor
1st Pijnacker
1st Roubaix
3rd Heusden-Zolder

1st Overall Junior Superprestige

1st Ruddervoorde
1st Asper-Gavere
1st Hamme-Zogge
1st Diegem
1st Vorselaar
2nd Hoogstraten

1st Sluitingsprijs Oostmalle Juniors
1st Kasteelcross Zonnebeke Juniors
2nd National Junior Championships
2nd Krawatencross Juniors
2009–2010
Under-23 GvA Trophy

2nd Azencross

UCI Under-23 World Cup

3rd Heusden-Zolder
3rd Roubaix

3rd Steinmaur
7th UCI Under-23 World Championships
2010–2011
UCI Under-23 World Cup

2nd Heusden-Zolder

Under-23 GvA Trophy

3rd Sluitingsprijs Oostmalle
3rd Azencross
3rd Grand Prix Rouwmoer

Under-23 Superprestige

3rd Gieten

5th UCI Under-23 World Championships
2011–2012
Under-23 GvA Trophy

1st Grand Prix Rouwmoer
3rd Azencross

Under-23 Superprestige

2nd Ruddervoorde

2nd Centrumcross Surhuisterveen
2nd Openingsveldrit van Harderwijk
2nd Vlaamse Industrieprijs Bosduin Under-23
2012–2013
Under-23 BPost Bank Trophy

2nd Krawatencross

4th UCI Under-23 World Championships
