= 2010–11 cyclo-cross season =

International competitions in the sport of cyclo-cross in the 2010–11 season included the World Cup, Superprestige, and Gazet van Antwerpen (GVA) events. There were also national championships in a number of countries.

== Race calendar ==
UCI World Cup
Superprestige
GVA Trophy

Date	Venue	Winner	Second	Third
3 October	(Belgium) Namen	(Czech Republic) Zdeněk Štybar	(Belgium) Klaas Vantornout	(Belgium) Kevin Pauwels
10 October	(Belgium) Ruddervoorde	(Czech Republic) Zdeněk Štybar	(Belgium) Bart Aernouts	(Belgium) Sven Nys
17 October	(Switzerland) Aigle	(Czech Republic) Zdeněk Štybar	(Belgium) Niels Albert	(Belgium) Kevin Pauwels
24 October	(Czech Republic) Plzeň	(Czech Republic) Zdeněk Štybar	(Belgium) Kevin Pauwels	(Belgium) Niels Albert
31 October	(Belgium) Zonhoven	(Czech Republic) Zdeněk Štybar	(Belgium) Kevin Pauwels	(Belgium) Sven Nys
1 November	(Belgium) Koppenberg	(Belgium) Sven Nys	(Belgium) Niels Albert	(Belgium) Kevin Pauwels
14 November	(Belgium) Hamme-Zogge	(Belgium) Sven Nys	(Belgium) Klaas Vantornout	(Belgium) Niels Albert
20 November	(Belgium) Hasselt	(Belgium) Kevin Pauwels	(Czech Republic) Zdeněk Štybar	(Belgium) Sven Nys
21 November	(Belgium) Asper-Gavere	(Belgium) Sven Nys	(Belgium) Kevin Pauwels	(Belgium) Niels Albert
27 November	(Belgium) Koksijde	(Belgium) Niels Albert	(Czech Republic) Zdeněk Štybar	(Belgium) Sven Nys
28 November	(Netherlands) Gieten	(Belgium) Tom Meeusen	(Czech Republic) Radomír Šimůnek	(Belgium) Sven Vanthourenhout
5 December	(Spain) Igorre	(Belgium) Niels Albert	(France) Francis Mourey	(Belgium) Sven Nys
11 December	(Belgium) Essen	(Belgium) Sven Nys	(Belgium) Klaas Vantornout	(Belgium) Kevin Pauwels
19 December	(Belgium) Kalmthout	(Belgium) Tom Meeusen	(Belgium) Sven Nys	(Belgium) Kevin Pauwels
26 December	(Belgium) Heusden-Zolder	(Netherlands) Lars Boom	(Belgium) Niels Albert	(Belgium) Bart Wellens
27 December	(Belgium) Diegem	(Belgium) Niels Albert	(Belgium) Sven Nys	(Czech Republic) Zdeněk Štybar
29 December	(Belgium) Loenhout	(Belgium) Niels Albert	(Belgium) Sven Nys	(Czech Republic) Zdeněk Štybar
1 January	(Belgium) Baal	(Belgium) Sven Nys	(Czech Republic) Zdeněk Štybar	(Belgium) Niels Albert
16 January	(France) Pont-Château	(Belgium) Kevin Pauwels	(Belgium) Niels Albert	(Belgium) Sven Nys
23 January	(Netherlands) Hoogerheide	(Belgium) Niels Albert	(Belgium) Kevin Pauwels	(Belgium) Sven Nys
5 February	(Belgium) Lille	(Belgium) Kevin Pauwels	(Czech Republic) Zdeněk Štybar	(Belgium) Sven Nys
6 February	(Belgium) Hoogstraten	(Belgium) Sven Nys	(Belgium) Niels Albert	(Belgium) Kevin Pauwels
12 February	(Belgium) Middelkerke	(Belgium) Klaas Vantornout	(Belgium) Kevin Pauwels	(Belgium) Bart Wellens
20 February	(Belgium) Oostmalle	(Belgium) Niels Albert	(Czech Republic) Zdeněk Štybar	(Belgium) Bart Aernouts

=== National Championships ===
Nation	Men's winner	Women's winner
Austria	Peter Presslauer	Elke Riedl
Belgium	Niels Albert	Sanne Cant
Canada	Chris Sheppard	Wendy Simms
Croatia	Dani Simčič	Maja Marukič
Denmark	Kenneth Hansen	Annika Langvad
Finland	Kimmo Kananen	Anna Lindström
France	Francis Mourey	Caroline Mani
Germany	Philipp Walsleben	Hanka Kupfernagel
Hungary	Szilard Buruczki	Barbara Benkó
Ireland	Robin Seymour	Ciara McManus
Italy	Marco Aurelio Fontana	Vania Rossi
Japan	Keiichi Tsujiura	Ayako Toyooka
Luxembourg	Jempy Drucker	Christine Majerus
Netherlands	Lars Boom	Marianne Vos
Poland	Mariusz Gil	Dorota Warczyk
Romania	Eduard Grosu	
United Kingdom	Paul Oldham	Helen Wyman
Czech Republic	Zdeněk Štybar	Kateřina Nash
Serbia	Bojan Durdič	Jovana Crnogorač
Slovakia	Robert Gavenda	Zuzana Vojtasova
Sweden	Emil Lindgren	Kajsa Snihs
Spain	Javier Ruiz De Larrinaga	Aida Nuño
United States	Todd Wells	Katie Compton
Switzerland	Christian Heule	Jasmin Achermann
