= 2011–12 Cyclo-cross Superprestige =

Details
- Dates: 9 October 2011 – 11 February 2012
- Location: Belgium and Netherlands
- Races: 8

Champions
- Male individual champion: Sven Nys (BEL)

The 2011–12 Cyclo-cross Superprestige events and season-long competition took place between 9 October 2011 and 11 February 2012. Sven Nys was the defending champion and prolonged his title to win his 11th Superprestige.

== Results ==
Date	Venue	Winner	Second	Third	Classification Leader
9 October	(Belgium) Ruddervoorde	Niels Albert (BEL)	Bart Aernouts (BEL)	Klaas Vantornout (BEL)	Niels Albert (BEL)
30 October	(Belgium) Zonhoven	Niels Albert (BEL)	Sven Nys (BEL)	Kevin Pauwels (BEL)	Niels Albert (BEL)
13 November	(Belgium) Hamme-Zogge	Zdeněk Štybar (CZE)	Kevin Pauwels (BEL)	Sven Nys (BEL)	Niels Albert (BEL)
20 November	(Belgium) Asper-Gavere	Kevin Pauwels (BEL)	Tom Meeusen (BEL)	Zdeněk Štybar (CZE)	Zdeněk Štybar (CZE)
27 November	(Netherlands) Gieten	Sven Nys (BEL)	Kevin Pauwels (BEL)	Rob Peeters (BEL)	Sven Nys (BEL)
23 December	(Belgium) Diegem	Niels Albert (BEL)	Kevin Pauwels (BEL)	Sven Nys (BEL)	Sven Nys (BEL)
5 February	(Belgium) Hoogstraten	Tom Meeusen (BEL)	Kevin Pauwels (BEL)	Sven Nys (BEL)	Sven Nys (BEL)
11 February	(Belgium) Middelkerke	Zdeněk Štybar (CZE)	Sven Nys (BEL)	Tom Meeusen (BEL)	Sven Nys (BEL)

=== Standings ===
In each race, the top 15 riders gain points, going from 15 points for the winner decreasing by one point per position to 1 point for the rider finishing in 15th position. In case of ties in the total score of two or more riders, the result of the last race counts as decider. If this is not decisive because two or more riders scored no points, the penultimate race counts, and so on until there is a difference.

Pos	Name	Tot	RUD	ZON	H-Z	A-G	GIE	DIE	HGS	MID
1	Sven Nys (BEL)	105	12	14	13	11	15	13	13	14
2	Kevin Pauwels (BEL)	99	3	13	14	15	14	14	14	12
3	Zdeněk Štybar (CZE)	92	10	12	15	13	10	8	9	15
4	Tom Meeusen (BEL)	78	9	9	7	14	11	0	15	13
5	Klaas Vantornout (BEL)	74	13	10	0	10	12	9	10	10
6	Bart Aernouts (BEL)	73	14	8	10	12	9	12	3	5
7	Niels Albert (BEL)	64	15	15	12	0	0	15	0	7
8	Radomír Šimůnek (CZE)	63	0	7	11	8	8	7	11	11
9	Bart Wellens (BEL)	50	11	11	9	9	0	10	0	0
10	Dieter Vanthourenhout (BEL)	41	6	5	6	2	7	0	7	8
11	Sven Vanthourenhout (BEL)	37	8	0	4	0	4	0	12	9
12	Rob Peeters (BEL)	34	1	6	0	5	13	5	0	4
13	Thijs van Amerongen (NED)	19	4	0	3	3	6	3	0	0
14	Gerben de Knegt (NED)	15	0	4	0	4	3	0	2	2
15	Mariusz Gil (POL)	15	0	0	8	0	0	6	1	0
16	Joeri Adams (BEL)	13	0	2	0	7	0	0	4	0
17	Aurélien Duval (FRA)	11	0	0	0	0	0	11	0	0
18	Marcel Meisen (GER)	11	0	0	0	0	5	1	5	0
19	Steve Chainel (FRA)	11	7	0	0	0	0	4	0	0
20	Vincent Baestaens (BEL)	10	2	3	5	0	0	0	0	0
21	Niels Wubben (NED)	9	0	0	2	6	0	0	0	1
22	Julien Taramarcaz (SUI)	8	0	0	0	0	0	0	8	0
23	Kenneth Van Compernolle (BEL)	7	0	1	0	1	2	0	0	3
24	Jan Denuwelare (BEL)	6	0	0	0	0	0	0	0	6
25	Thijs Al (NED)	6	0	0	0	0	0	0	6	0
26	Jim Aernouts (BEL)	5	5	0	0	0	0	0	0	0
27	Philipp Walsleben (GER)	2	0	0	0	0	0	2	0	0
28	Twan Van den Brand (NED)	1	0	0	0	0	1	0	0	0
29	Michell Huenders (NED)	1	0	0	1	0	0	0	0	0
Pos	Name	Tot	RUD	ZON	H-Z	A-G	GIE	DIE	HGS	MID
