= Wietse Bosmans =

Belgian cyclist

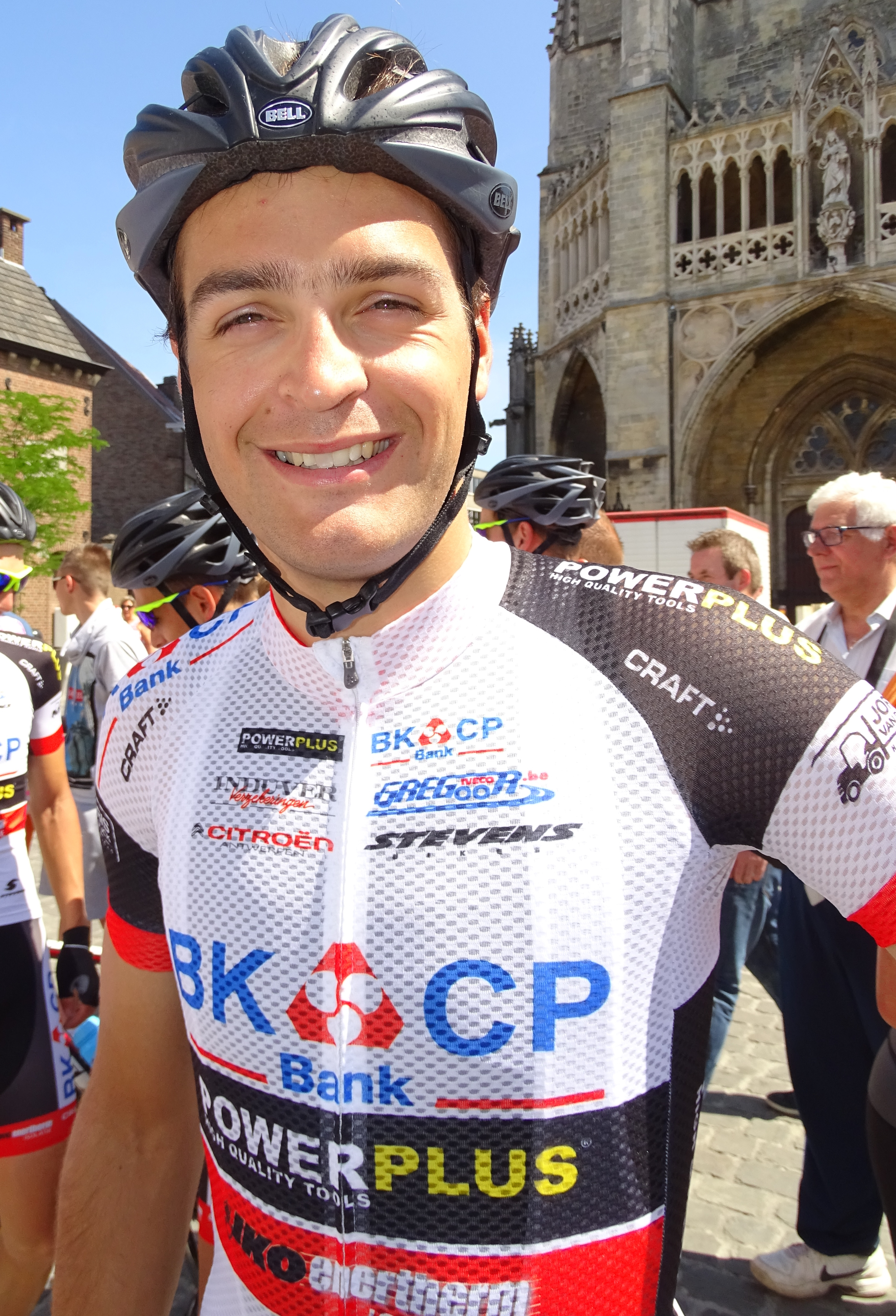
- Bosmans in 2015.

Personal information
- Full name: Wietse Bosmans
- Born: 30 December 1991 (age 34) Brasschaat, Belgium

Cycling career
- Sport: Cycling
- Current team: Creafin–TÜV SÜD
- Disciplines: Cyclo-cross; Road
- Role: Rider

Amateur teams
- 2018: Steylaerts–777
- 2019–: Creafin–TÜV SÜD

Professional teams
- 2010–2016: BKCP–Powerplus
- 2017–2018: ERA–Circus
- 2018: Corendon–Circus

Wietse Bosmans (born 30 December 1991 in Brasschaat) is a Belgian cyclist, who currently rides for Belgian team Creafin–TÜV SÜD.

== Major results ==
=== Cyclo-cross ===
2008–2009
1st Junior National Championships
1st Superprestige juniors, Hoogstraten
4th Junior World Championships
2009–2010
3rd Under-23 National Championships
2010-2011
GvA Trophy Under-23

1st Azencross
1st Grand Prix Sven Nys

2nd Under-23 National Championships
3rd Overall Under-23 World Cup

1st Heusden-Zolder

6th Under-23 World Championships
2011–2012
1st Under-23 National Championships
Superprestige Under-23

1st Ruddervoorde
1st Zonhoven

GvA Trophy Under-23

1st Azencross
1st Krawatencross
1st Sluitingsprijs Oostmalle

1st Side Event Under-23, Heusden-Zolder
2nd Under-23 World Championships
8th Overall Under-23 World Cup
2012–2013
1st Overall Under-23 World Cup

1st Plzeň
1st Koksijde
1st Heusden-Zolder
1st Hoogerheide

Superprestige Under-23

1st Hoogstraten

1st Overall bpost bank trophy Under-23

1st Grand Prix van Hasselt
1st Grand Prix Sven Nys

2nd Under-23 World Championships
2015–2016
QianSen Trophy Cyclocross

1st Yanqing Station, Beijing
1st Qiongzhong Station, Hainan

1st Nittany Lion Cross #1
1st Nittany Lion Cross #2
2016–2017
1st GGEW Grand Prix, Bensheim
1st Grand Prix Möbel Alvisse
1st Kasteelcross Zonnebeke

=== Road ===
2017
7th Heistse Pijl
