= 2011–12 cyclo-cross season =

The 2011–12 Cyclo-Cross is made up by the three main competitions of Cyclo-Cross discipline:

- World Cup
- Superprestige
- GvA Trophy

The season began on 9 October with the Cyclo-cross Ruddervoorde, won by Niels Albert. It ended on 19 February 2012.

== Race calendar ==
UCI World Championship
UCI World Cup
Superprestige
GVA Trophy

Date	Venue	Winner	Second	Third	Ref.
9 October	(Belgium) Ruddervoorde	(Belgium) Niels Albert	(Belgium) Bart Aernouts	(Belgium) Klaas Vantornout	
16 October	(Czech Republic) Plzeň	(Belgium) Sven Nys	(Belgium) Kevin Pauwels	(Czech Republic) Zdeněk Štybar	
23 October	(Czech Republic) Tábor	(Belgium) Kevin Pauwels	(Czech Republic) Zdeněk Štybar	(Belgium) Klaas Vantornout	
30 October	(Belgium) Zonhoven	(Belgium) Niels Albert	(Belgium) Sven Nys	(Belgium) Kevin Pauwels	
1 November	(Belgium) Koppenberg	(Belgium) Kevin Pauwels	(Belgium) Sven Nys	(Czech Republic) Zdeněk Štybar	
6 November	(Belgium) Ronse	(Belgium) Kevin Pauwels	(Czech Republic) Zdeněk Štybar	(Belgium) Niels Albert	
13 November	(Belgium) Hamme-Zogge	(Czech Republic) Zdeněk Štybar	(Belgium) Kevin Pauwels	(Belgium) Sven Nys	
19 November	(Belgium) Hasselt	(Belgium) Kevin Pauwels	(Czech Republic) Zdeněk Štybar	(Belgium) Sven Nys	
20 November	(Belgium) Asper-Gavere	(Belgium) Kevin Pauwels	(Belgium) Tom Meeusen	(Czech Republic) Zdeněk Štybar	
26 November	(Belgium) Koksijde	(Belgium) Sven Nys	(Belgium) Kevin Pauwels	(Belgium) Bart Aernouts	
27 November	(Netherlands) Gieten	(Belgium) Sven Nys	(Belgium) Kevin Pauwels	(Belgium) Rob Peeters	
4 December	(Spain) Igorre	(Belgium) Kevin Pauwels	(Belgium) Sven Nys	(Belgium) Tom Meeusen	
17 December	(Belgium) Essen	(Belgium) Bart Wellens	(Belgium) Niels Albert	(Belgium) Rob Peeters	
18 December	(Belgium) Namur	(Belgium) Sven Nys	(Belgium) Niels Albert	(Belgium) Klaas Vantornout	
23 December	(Belgium) Diegem	(Belgium) Niels Albert	(Belgium) Kevin Pauwels	(Belgium) Sven Nys	
26 December	(Belgium) Heusden-Zolder	(Belgium) Kevin Pauwels	(Czech Republic) Zdeněk Štybar	(Belgium) Sven Nys	
28 December	(Belgium) Loenhout	(Belgium) Niels Albert	(Czech Republic) Zdeněk Štybar	(Belgium) Sven Nys	
1 January	(Belgium) Baal	(Belgium) Sven Nys	(Belgium) Kevin Pauwels	(Belgium) Bart Wellens	
15 January	(France) Liévin	(Czech Republic) Zdeněk Štybar	(Belgium) Kevin Pauwels	(Czech Republic) Radomír Šimůnek Jr.	
22 January	(Netherlands) Hoogerheide	(Belgium) Kevin Pauwels	(Czech Republic) Zdeněk Štybar	(Belgium) Klaas Vantornout	
29 January	(Belgium) Koksijde	(Belgium) Niels Albert	(Belgium) Rob Peeters	(Belgium) Kevin Pauwels	
4 February	(Belgium) Lille	(Belgium) Tom Meeusen	(Czech Republic) Zdeněk Štybar	(Belgium) Kevin Pauwels	
5 February	(Belgium) Hoogstraten	(Belgium) Tom Meeusen	(Belgium) Kevin Pauwels	(Belgium) Sven Nys	
11 February	(Belgium) Middelkerke	(Czech Republic) Zdeněk Štybar	(Belgium) Sven Nys	(Belgium) Tom Meeusen	
19 February	(Belgium) Oostmalle	(Belgium) Niels Albert	(Czech Republic) Zdeněk Štybar	(Belgium) Kevin Pauwels	

=== National Championships ===
Nation	Men's winner	Women's winner
Austria	Daniel Geismayr	Jacqueline Hahn
Belgium	Sven Nys	Sanne Cant
Canada	Chris Sheppard	Emily Batty
Croatia	Jasmin Bečirovič	Mia Radotič
Czech Republic	Zdeněk Štybar	Martina Mikulášková
Denmark	Kenneth Hansen	Nikoline Hansen
Finland	Sami Tiainen	Maija Rossi
France	Aurélien Duval	Lucienne Chainel-Lefevre
Germany	Christoph Pfingsten	Hanka Kupfernagel
Hungary	Szilard Buruczki	Eszter Dosa
Ireland	Robin Seymour	
Italy	Elia Silvestri	Eva Lechner
Japan	Yu Takenouchi	Ayako Toyooka
Luxembourg	Gusty Bausch	Christine Majerus
Netherlands	Lars Boom	Marianne Vos
New Zealand	Gary Hall	Kim Hurst
Poland	Mariusz Gil	Olga Wasiuk
United Kingdom	Ian Field	Helen Wyman
Serbia	Bojan Djurdjc	Jovana Crnogorac
Slovakia	Robert Gavenda	Janka Števková
Sweden	Magnus Darvell	Åsa Maria Erlandsson
Spain	Isaac Suárez	Rocío Martín
United States	Jeremy Powers	Katie Compton
Switzerland	Julien Taramarcaz	Jasmin Achermann

== See also ==
- 2012 UCI Cyclo-cross World Championships
- 2010–2011 cyclo-cross season
