= 2014–15 Cyclo-cross BPost Bank Trophy =

Belgian cyclo-cross competition

2014–2015 Cyclo-cross BPost Bank Trophy
Details
- Dates: 12 October 2014–7 February 2015
- Location: Belgium
- Races: 8

The BPost Bank Trophy 2014–2015 is a season long cyclo-cross competition which began on 12 October 2014 with the GP Mario De Clercq and will end on 7 February 2015 in Lille. In this season Oostmalle, that became an independent race this season, is replaced by Hamme, a former race in the Superprestige.

This edition follows the ranking system introduced the year before, using time instead of points.

== Calendar ==
Date	Race	Location	Winner	Second	Third	Classification leader
12 October	GP Mario De Clercq	Ronse	Sven Nys (BEL)	Mathieu van der Poel (NLD)	Klaas Vantornout (BEL)	Sven Nys (BEL)
1 November	Koppenbergcross	Oudenaarde	Wout van Aert (BEL)	Sven Nys (BEL)	Kevin Pauwels (BEL)	Sven Nys (BEL)
30 November	Bollekescross	Hamme	Wout van Aert (BEL)	Mathieu van der Poel (NLD)	Philipp Walsleben (GER)	Sven Nys (BEL)
6 December	Grand Prix van Hasselt	Hasselt	Kevin Pauwels (BEL)	Wout van Aert (BEL)	Tom Meeusen (BEL)	Wout van Aert (BEL)
20 December	Grand Prix Rouwmoer	Essen	Wout van Aert (BEL)	Tom Meeusen (BEL)	Rob Peeters (BEL)	Wout van Aert (BEL)
30 December	Azencross	Loenhout	Wout van Aert (BEL)	Mathieu van der Poel (NLD)	Tom Meeusen (BEL)	Wout van Aert (BEL)
1 January	Grand Prix Sven Nys	Baal	Wout van Aert (BEL)	Lars van der Haar (NED)	Kevin Pauwels (BEL)	Wout van Aert (BEL)
7 February	Krawatencross	Lille	Mathieu van der Poel (NED)	Wout van Aert (BEL)	Sven Nys (BEL)	Wout van Aert (BEL)

== Ranking (top 10) ==
	Rider	Team	Time
1	Wout van Aert (BEL)	Vastgoedservice–Golden Palace	7h 17' 51"
2	Kevin Pauwels (BEL)	Sunweb–Napoleon Games	+ 6' 07"
3	Sven Nys (BEL)	Crelan-AA Drink	+ 7' 09"
4	Tom Meeusen (BEL)	Telenet–Fidea	+ 7' 38"
5	Lars van der Haar (NED)	Giant-Shimano/Giant-Alpecin	+ 12' 12"
6	Rob Peeters (BEL)	Vastgoedservice–Golden Palace	+ 16' 31"
7	Sven Vanthourenhout (BEL)	Crelan–AA Drink	+ 17' 08"
8	Joeri Adams (BEL)	Vastgoedservice–Golden Palace	+ 17' 24"
9	Klaas Vantornout (BEL)	Sunweb–Napoleon Games	+ 18' 54"
10	Philipp Walsleben (GER)	BKCP-Powerplus	+ 19' 10"

== Results ==
=== Ronse ===
	Rider	Team	Time	Bonus
1	Sven Nys (BEL)	Crelan–AA Drink	1h 00' 58"	30"
2	Mathieu van der Poel (NED)	BKCP–Powerplus	+ 50"	15"
3	Klaas Vantornout (BEL)	Sunweb–Napoleon Games	+ 54"	5"
4	Kevin Pauwels (BEL)	Sunweb–Napoleon Games	+ 1' 04"	
5	Lars van der Haar (NED)	Giant–Shimano	+ 1' 04"	
6	Tom Meeusen (BEL)	Telenet–Fidea	+ 1' 40"	
7	Wout van Aert (BEL)	Vastgoedservice–Golden Palace	+ 1' 49"	
8	Zdeněk Štybar (CZE)	Omega Pharma–Quick-Step	+ 1' 59"	10"
9	Thijs van Amerongen (NED)	Telenet–Fidea	+ 2' 01"	
10	Joeri Adams (BEL)	Vastgoedservice–Golden Palace	+ 2' 21"	

=== Oudenaarde ===
	Rider	Team	Time	Bonus
1	Wout van Aert (BEL)	Vastgoedservice–Golden Palace	58' 59"	15"
2	Sven Nys (BEL)	Crelan–AA Drink	+ 2"	15"
3	Kevin Pauwels (BEL)	Sunweb–Napoleon Games	+ 11"	5"
4	Klaas Vantornout (BEL)	Sunweb–Napoleon Games	+ 17"	5"
5	Tom Meeusen (BEL)	Telenet–Fidea	+ 26"	
6	Lars van der Haar (NED)	Giant–Shimano	+ 53"	10"
7	Bart Aernouts (BEL)	Corendon–KwadrO	+ 1'13"	
8	Thijs van Amerongen (NED)	Telenet–Fidea	+ 1'14"	
9	Niels Wubben (NED)	Telenet–Fidea	+ 1'33"	
10	Rob Peeters (BEL)	Vastgoedservice–Golden Palace	+ 1'57"	

=== Hamme ===
	Rider	Team	Time	Bonus
1	Wout van Aert (BEL)	Vastgoedservice–Golden Palace	1h 03' 52"	15"
2	Mathieu van der Poel (NED)	BKCP–Powerplus	+ 0"	10"
3	Philipp Walsleben (GER)	BKCP–Powerplus	+ 7"	5"
4	Sven Nys (BEL)	Crelan–AA Drink	+ 8"	5"
5	Kevin Pauwels (BEL)	Sunweb–Napoleon Games	+ 8"	10"
6	Lars van der Haar (NED)	Giant–Shimano	+ 8"	
7	Jens Adams (BEL)	Vastgoedservice–Golden Palace	+ 9"	
8	Marcel Meisen (GER)	Corendon–KwadrO	+ 9"	
9	Sven Vanthourenhout (BEL)	Crelan–AA Drink	+ 12"	
10	Julien Taramarcaz (SWI)	Corendon–KwadrO	+ 12"	

=== Hasselt ===
	Rider	Team	Time	Bonus
1	Kevin Pauwels (BEL)	Sunweb–Napoleon Games	1h 04' 11"	25"
2	Wout van Aert (BEL)	Vastgoedservice–Golden Palace	+ 3"	10"
3	Tom Meeusen (BEL)	Telenet–Fidea	+ 30"	10"
4	Sven Nys (BEL)	Crelan–AA Drink	+ 31"	
5	Lars van der Haar (NED)	Giant–Shimano	+ 1'04"	
6	Corné van Kessel (NED)	Telenet–Fidea	+ 1'30"	15"
7	Sven Vanthourenhout (BEL)	Crelan–AA Drink	+ 1'31"	
8	Julien Taramarcaz (SWI)	Corendon–KwadrO	+ 1'53"	
9	Jim Aernouts (BEL)	Sunweb–Napoleon Games	+ 1'53"	
10	Bart Wellens (BEL)	Telenet–Fidea	+ 1'57"	

=== Essen ===
	Rider	Team	Time	Bonus
1	Wout van Aert (BEL)	Vastgoedservice–Golden Palace	59' 22"	30"
2	Tom Meeusen (BEL)	Telenet–Fidea	+ 1' 06"	15"
3	Rob Peeters (BEL)	Vastgoedservice–Golden Palace	+ 1' 40"	15"
4	Kevin Pauwels (BEL)	Sunweb–Napoleon Games	+ 1' 50"	
5	Philipp Walsleben (GER)	BKCP–Powerplus	+ 2' 02"	
6	Giani Vermeersch (BEL)	Sunweb–Napoleon Games	+ 2' 07"	
7	Sven Vanthourenhout (BEL)	Crelan–AA Drink	+ 2' 13"	
8	Joeri Adams (BEL)	Vastgoedservice–Golden Palace	+ 2' 22"	
9	Jens Adams (BEL)	Vastgoedservice–Golden Palace	+ 2' 27"	
10	Tim Merlier (BEL)	Sunweb–Napoleon Games	+ 2' 31"	

=== Loenhout ===
	Rider	Team	Time	Bonus
1	Wout van Aert (BEL)	Vastgoedservice–Golden Palace	1h 04' 02"	30"
2	Mathieu van der Poel (NED)	BKCP–Powerplus	+ 37"	20"
3	Tom Meeusen (BEL)	Telenet–Fidea	+ 2' 01"	10"
4	Giani Vermeersch (BEL)	Sunweb–Napoleon Games	+ 2' 17"	
5	Jan Denuwelaere (BEL)	Vastgoedservice–Golden Palace	+ 2' 17"	
6	Kevin Pauwels (BEL)	Sunweb–Napoleon Games	+ 2' 20"	
7	Tim Merlier (BEL)	Sunweb–Napoleon Games	+ 2' 24"	
8	Sven Nys (BEL)	Crelan–AA Drink	+ 2' 25"	
9	Rob Peeters (BEL)	Vastgoedservice–Golden Palace	+ 2' 36"	
10	Vincent Baestaens (BEL)	BKCP–Powerplus	+ 3' 01"	

=== Baal ===
	Rider	Team	Time	Bonus
1	Wout van Aert (BEL)	Vastgoedservice–Golden Palace	1h 06' 10"	30"
2	Lars van der Haar (NED)	Team Giant–Alpecin	+ 45"	20"
3	Kevin Pauwels (BEL)	Sunweb–Napoleon Games	+ 56"	5"
4	Giani Vermeersch (BEL)	Sunweb–Napoleon Games	+ 1' 24"	
5	Sven Nys (BEL)	Crelan–AA Drink	+ 1' 54"	
6	Rob Peeters (BEL)	Vastgoedservice–Golden Palace	+ 2' 01"	
7	Klaas Vantornout (BEL)	Sunweb–Napoleon Games	+ 2' 16"	
8	Joeri Adams (BEL)	Vastgoedservice–Golden Palace	+ 2' 19"	10"
9	Tom Meeusen (NED)	Telenet–Fidea	+ 2' 21"	5"
10	Marcel Meisen (GER)	Corendon–KwadrO	+ 3' 18"	

=== Lille ===
	Rider	Team	Time	Bonus
1				
2				
3				
4				
5				
6				
7				
8				
9				
10				
