= Kenneth Van Compernolle =

Personal information
- Born: 30 March 1988 (age 38) Beernem, Belgium

Cycling career
- Sport: Cycling
- Current team: Asfra Racing Team Oudenaarde
- Disciplines: Cyclo-cross; Road
- Role: Rider

Amateur teams
- 2011: Styling & Concept
- 2014: NCC Metalac
- 2017–2018: Tarteletto–Isorex Cyclocross
- 2019–: Asfra Racing Team Oudenaarde

Professional teams
- 2007–2010: Sunweb–Projob
- 2015–2016: Colba–Superano Ham

Kenneth Van Compernolle (born 30 March 1988) is a Belgian professional cyclo-cross cyclist.

== Major results ==
2004–2005
1st Silvestercyclocross Juniors
2005–2006
2nd National Junior Championships
Junior Superprestige

3rd Vorselaar
3rd Hamme-Zogge

3rd Vlaamse Duinencross Juniors
2008–2009
UCI Under-23 World Cup

1st Koksijde
2nd Pijnacker

Under-23 Superprestige

1st Gieten
2nd Vorselaar
2nd Hamme-Zogge
3rd Gavere

Under-23 GvA Trophy

1st Jaarmarktcross Niel
2nd Zonhoven
3rd Sluitingsprijs Oostmalle

2nd Kasteelcross Zonnebeke
2nd Grand Prix van Hasselt Under-23
3rd European Under-23 Championships
3rd National Under-23 Championships
3rd Grand Prix Rouwmoer Under-23
2009–2010
Under-23 Superprestige

2nd Zonhoven
3rd Gieten

Under-23 GvA Trophy

3rd Sluitingsprijs Oostmalle

2010–2011
National Trophy Series

1st Rutland

2011–2012
2nd Uster
3rd Lanarvily
