= Vincent Baestaens =

Belgian cyclo-cross cyclist

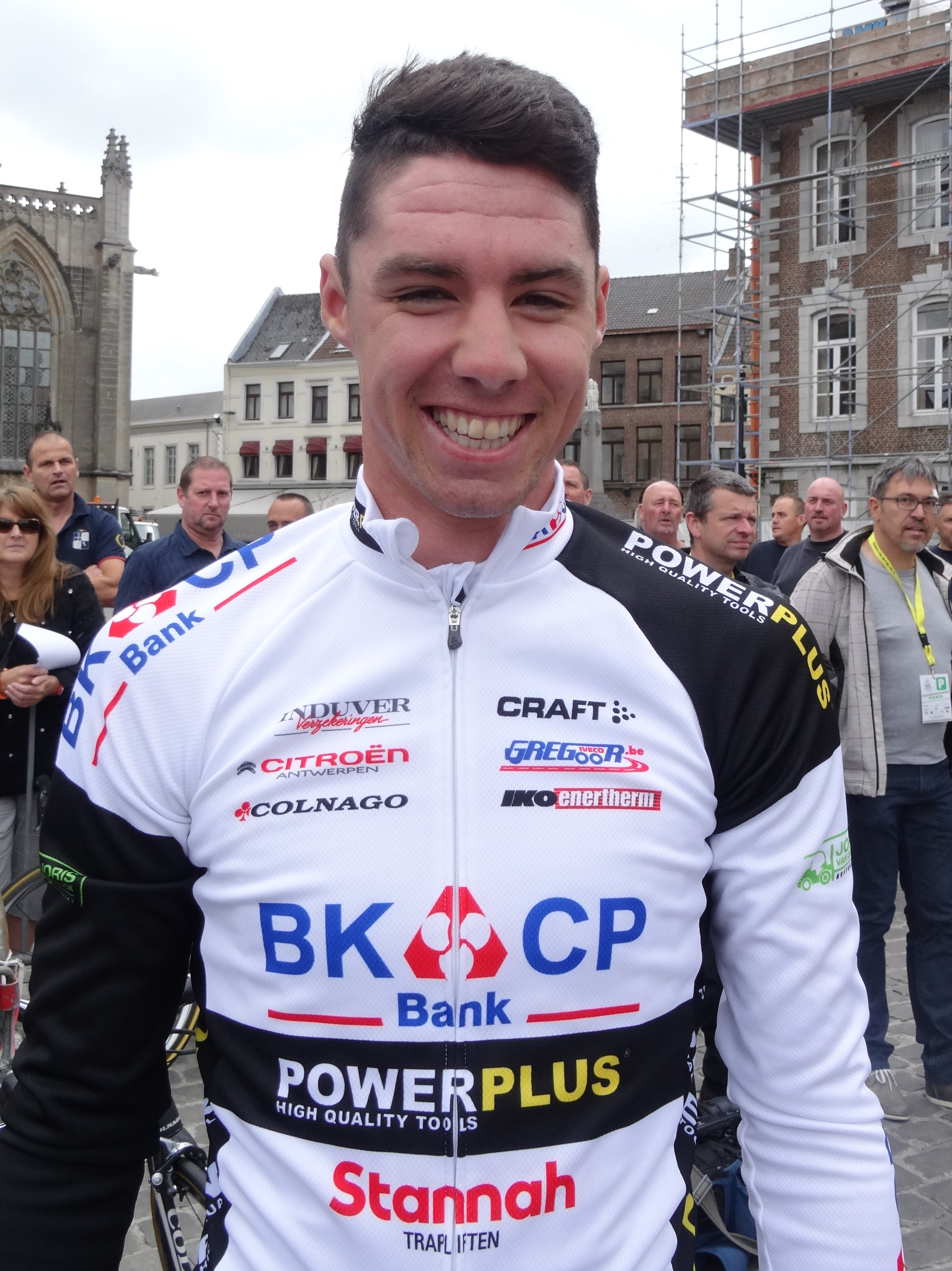
- Baestaens in 2014

Personal information
- Full name: Vincent Baestaens
- Born: 18 June 1989 (age 37) Ekeren, Belgium
- Height: 1.82 m (6 ft 0 in)
- Weight: 68 kg (150 lb)

Cycling career
- Sport: Cycling
- Current team: Deschacht–Group Hens–Containers Maes
- Disciplines: Cyclo-cross; Road
- Role: Rider

Amateur teams
- 2011: KDL Trans–Your Mover
- 2017–2019: Containers Maes

Professional teams
- 2007–2010: Fidea
- 2011–2013: Landbouwkrediet
- 2014–2016: BKCP–Powerplus
- 2017: Telenet–Fidea Lions
- 2019–: Group Hens–Maes Containers

Vincent Baestaens (born 18 June 1989 in Ekeren) is a Belgian cyclo-cross and road cyclist, who currently rides for UCI Cyclo-cross team Deschacht–Group Hens–Containers Maes.

== Major results ==
2006–2007
1st UEC European Junior Championships
2008–2009
1st National Under-23 Championships
Under-23 Gazet van Antwerpen

1st Loenhout
2nd Baal

2010–2011
UCI Under-23 World Cup

1st Koksijde
1st Kalmthout

Under-23 Superprestige

1st Gavere
1st Hoogstraten

1st Under-23 Aigle
2011–2012
1st Villarcayo
2012-2013
3rd Fae' di Oderzo
2014–2015
1st Podbrezová
1st Ternitz
1st Rossano Veneto
1st Fae' di Oderzo
1st Differdange
2nd Rucphen
3rd Heerlen
2015–2016
1st Rochester
Toi Toi Cup

2nd Tábor

Soudal Classics

3rd Leuven

2016–2017
1st Muskiz
2nd Zonnebeke
2017–2018
1st Karrantza
2nd Fae' di Oderzo
2nd Lutterbach
3rd Waterloo
2018–2019
EKZ CrossTour

1st Aigle

Toi Toi Cup

1st Uničov

SMP Master Cross

1st Fae' di Oderzo

1st Manlleu
1st Elorrio
2nd Laudio
2nd Poprad
2019–2020
Toi Toi Cup

1st Slaný

EKZ CrossTour

1st Aigle

SMP Master Cross

1st Fae' di Oderzo

1st Rochester I
2nd Iowa City III
2020–2021
EKZ CrossTour

2nd Bern
2nd Baden

2021–2022
USCX Series

1st Rochester I
1st Rochester II
1st Baltimore I
1st Baltimore II
1st Iowa City I

2nd Jablines
2022–2023
USCX Series

1st Roanoke I
1st Roanoke II
1st Rochester I
1st Rochester II
1st Baltimore I
2nd Baltimore II

2023–2024
USCX Series

1st Rochester I
1st Rochester II
2nd Roanoke II
