= Vanthourenhout =

Vanthourenhout is a surname. Notable people with the surname include:

- Dieter Vanthourenhout (born 1985), Belgian cyclist
- Sven Vanthourenhout (born 1981), Belgian cyclist
