= 2008–09 Cyclo-cross Superprestige =

Details
- Dates: 12 October 2008 – 12 February 2009
- Location: Belgium and Netherlands
- Races: 8

Champions
- Male individual champion: Sven Nys (BEL)

The 2008–09 Cyclo-cross Superprestige events and season-long competition takes place between 12 October 2008 and 12 February 2009. Eight events are organised.

== Results ==
=== Men ===
Date	Venue	Winner	Second	Third
12 October	(Belgium) Ruddervoorde	Sven Nys (BEL)	Klaas Vantornout (BEL)	Niels Albert (BEL)
2 November	(Netherlands) Veghel	Niels Albert (BEL)	Lars Boom (NED)	Sven Nys (BEL)
16 November	(Belgium) Asper-Gavere	Sven Nys (BEL)	Bart Wellens (BEL)	Klaas Vantornout (BEL)
23 November	(Belgium) Hamme-Zogge	Sven Nys (BEL)	Klaas Vantornout (BEL)	Bart Wellens (BEL)
30 November	(Netherlands) Gieten	Klaas Vantornout (BEL)	Bart Wellens (BEL)	Sven Nys (BEL)
28 December	(Belgium) Diegem	Zdeněk Štybar (CZE)	Klaas Vantornout (BEL)	Sven Nys (BEL)
8 February	(Belgium) Hoogstraten	Sven Nys (BEL)	Niels Albert (BEL)	Bart Wellens (BEL)
12 February	(Belgium) Vorselaar	Sven Nys (BEL)	Niels Albert (BEL)	Erwin Vervecken (BEL)

== Season standings ==
In each race, the top 15 riders gain points, going from 15 points for the winner decreasing by one point per position to 1 point for the rider finishing in 15th position.

Pos.	Rider	RUD	VEG	GAV	HAM	GIE	DIE	HOO	VOR	Points
1	(Belgium) Sven Nys	1	3	1	1	3	3	1	1	114
2	(Belgium) Klaas Vantornout	2	4	3	2	1	2	5	5	104
3	(Belgium) Bart Wellens	6	5	2	3	2	5	3	6	96
4	(Belgium) Kevin Pauwels	5	6	5	6	4	7	8	4	83
5	(Netherlands) Thijs Al	7	7	12	9	9	4	6	8	66
6	(Belgium) Erwin Vervecken	8	12	4	4	22	9	9	3	63
7	(Belgium) Niels Albert	3	1					2	2	56
8	(Czech Republic) Zdeněk Štybar	16	Ret		8	5	1	4		46
9	(Belgium) Rob Peeters	4	8	14	14	6	18	13	11	42
10	(Netherlands) Gerben de Knegt	13	11	15	11	8	8	10	12	40
11	(Belgium) Sven Vanthourenhout		13	Ret	5	20	6	11	7	38
12	(Belgium) Bart Aernouts	9	10	9	10	11	Ret	12	14	37
13	(Belgium) Dieter Vanthourenhout	10	9		16	7	19	19	10	28
14	(Netherlands) Richard Groenendaal	12	22	11	19	18	22	7	9	25
15	(Netherlands) Lars Boom	18	2	7			14		18	25
16	(Czech Republic) Petr Dlask	22	14	6	7			16		21
17	(Switzerland) Christian Heule	20		10		16	11	15		12
18	(Netherlands) Wilant van Gils	25	16	8	15	21	27		19	9
19	(Belgium) Ben Berden	14	18	23	17		15	14	13	8
20	(Belgium) Jan Verstraeten	23		17	13	17	12		16	7
21	(Czech Republic) Radomír Šimůnek	19	20	13	20	12				7
22	(Netherlands) Thijs van Amerongen	27	21	20	21	13	13	17		6
23	(Czech Republic) Martin Zlámalík	26	Ret	24	26	10	20	20		6
24	(Czech Republic) Martin Bína						10			6
25	(United States) Jonathan Page	17	15	16	12		28			5
26	(Belgium) Jan Soetens	11	Ret				26		24	5
27	(Italy) Marco Bianco		Ret		23	14			15	3
28	(Belgium) Tom Van den Bosch	15	19	22	22		21		21	1
29	(Netherlands) Eddy van IJzendoorn		24			15			17	1
Pos.	Rider	RUD	VEG	GAV	HAM	GIE	DIE	HOO	VOR	Points

== See also ==
- 2008–2009 UCI Cyclo-cross World Cup
- 2008–2009 Cyclo-cross Gazet van Antwerpen
