= 2012–13 Cyclo-cross Superprestige =

Details
- Dates: 7 October 2012 – 16 February 2013
- Location: Belgium and Netherlands
- Races: 8

Champions
- Male individual champion: Sven Nys (BEL)

The 2012–13 Cyclo-cross Superprestige events and season-long competition took place between 7 October 2012 and 16 February 2013. Sven Nys won it for the 12th time, leading the classification from start to finish.

== Results ==
Date	Venue	Winner	Second	Third	Classification Leader
7 October	(Belgium) Ruddervoorde	Sven Nys (BEL)	Niels Albert (BEL)	Kevin Pauwels (BEL)	Sven Nys (BEL)
4 November	(Belgium) Zonhoven	Sven Nys (BEL)	Niels Albert (BEL)	Bart Aernouts (BEL)	Sven Nys (BEL)
11 November	(Belgium) Hamme-Zogge	Sven Nys (BEL)	Niels Albert (BEL)	Lars van der Haar (NED)	Sven Nys (BEL)
18 November	(Belgium) Asper-Gavere	Sven Nys (BEL)	Klaas Vantornout (BEL)	Bart Wellens (BEL)	Sven Nys (BEL)
25 November	(Netherlands) Gieten	Klaas Vantornout (BEL)	Sven Nys (BEL)	Kevin Pauwels (BEL)	Sven Nys (BEL)
30 December	(Belgium) Diegem	Niels Albert (BEL)	Kevin Pauwels (BEL)	Zdeněk Štybar (CZE)	Sven Nys (BEL)
10 February	(Belgium) Hoogstraten	Sven Nys (BEL)	Klaas Vantornout (BEL)	Kevin Pauwels (BEL)	Sven Nys (BEL)
16 February	(Belgium) Middelkerke	Klaas Vantornout (BEL)	Niels Albert (BEL)	Tom Meeusen (BEL)	Sven Nys (BEL)

== Season standings ==
In each race, the top 15 riders gain points, going from 15 points for the winner decreasing by one point per position to 1 point for the rider finishing in 15th position. In case of ties in the total score of two or more riders, the result of the last race counts as decider. If this is not decisive because two or more riders scored no points, the penultimate race counts, and so on until there is a difference.

Pos.	Rider	RUD	ZON	HAM	GAV	GIE	DIE	HOO	MID	Points
1	(Belgium) Sven Nys	1	1	1	1	2	7	1	5	109
2	(Belgium) Niels Albert	2	2	2	6	5	1	6	2	102
3	(Belgium) Klaas Vantornout	4	9	6	2	1	4	2	1	99
4	(Belgium) Kevin Pauwels	3	4	5	4	3	2	3	14	90
5	(Belgium) Rob Peeters	11	7	9	5	4	6	4	7	75
6	(Belgium) Bart Aernouts	9	3	4	7	6	11	11	4	73
7	(Belgium) Bart Wellens	8	8	12	3	11	12	Ret	6	52
8	(Netherlands) Lars van der Haar	7	5	3	10	13	9			49
9	(Germany) Marcel Meisen	Ret	11	7	Ret	25	8	8	11	35
10	(Belgium) Tom Meeusen	5	22				10	13	3	33
11	(Germany) Philipp Walsleben	19	10	21	22	7	Ret	5	10	32
12	(Netherlands) Thijs van Amerongen	10	13	27	8	12	22	7	20	30
13	(Switzerland) Julien Taramarcaz	13	6	11	9		14	22	15	28
14	(Belgium) Jan Denuwelaere	17	14	16	13	8	18	9	13	23
15	(Czech Republic) Radomír Šimůnek	Ret	29	8	Ret	23	5	Ret	Ret	19
16	(Belgium) Jim Aernouts	12	Ret	17	15	16	15	14	8	16
17	(Belgium) Sven Vanthourenhout	15			14	10	13	Ret	12	16
18	(Belgium) Dieter Vanthourenhout	6	23	10	Ret	18	25	24	19	16
19	(Czech Republic) Zdeněk Štybar						3			13
20	(United States) Jonathan Page	33	24	28	12	15	23	10	22	11
21	(Poland) Mariusz Gil	Ret	28	13	Ret	9	20	Ret	26	10
22	(Czech Republic) Martin Bína								9	7
23	(France) Aurélien Duval	20	19	14	11		29			7
24	(Netherlands) Twan van den Brand	29	12	15		Ret			30	5
25	(Switzerland) Simon Zahner							12		4
26	(Netherlands) Micki van Empel	27	26	22	Ret	14	24	Ret	28	2
27	(Czech Republic) Martin Zlámalík	14			17		Ret	Ret	25	2
28	(Netherlands) Gerben de Knegt	24	17	18	Ret	19		15	16	1
29	(Netherlands) Niels Wubben	18	15	19	Ret	21	19	17	32	1
Pos.	Rider	RUD	ZON	HAM	GAV	GIE	DIE	HOO	MID	Points
