= 2010–11 Cyclo-cross Gazet van Antwerpen =

The 2010–2011 Cyclo-cross Gazet van Antwerpen took place between 3 October 2010 and 20 February 2011. All eight rounds take place in Belgium.

== Results and standings ==
=== Race results ===
Date	Venue	1st place, gold medalist(s)	2nd place, silver medalist(s)	3rd place, bronze medalist(s)	Classification Leader
3 October	Namur	Zdeněk Štybar (CZE)	Klaas Vantornout (BEL)	Kevin Pauwels (BEL)	Zdeněk Štybar (CZE)
1 November	Oudenaarde	Sven Nys (BEL)	Niels Albert (BEL)	Kevin Pauwels (BEL)	Zdeněk Štybar (CZE)
20 November	Hasselt	Kevin Pauwels (BEL)	Zdeněk Štybar (CZE)	Sven Nys (BEL)	Zdeněk Štybar (CZE)
11 December	Essen	Sven Nys (BEL)	Klaas Vantornout (BEL)	Kevin Pauwels (BEL)	Kevin Pauwels (BEL)
29 December	Loenhout	Niels Albert (BEL)	Sven Nys (BEL)	Zdeněk Štybar (CZE)	Kevin Pauwels (BEL)
1 January	Baal	Sven Nys (BEL)	Zdeněk Štybar (CZE)	Niels Albert (BEL)	Sven Nys (BEL)
5 February	Lille	Kevin Pauwels (BEL)	Zdeněk Štybar (CZE)	Sven Nys (BEL)	Sven Nys (BEL)
20 February	Oostmalle	Niels Albert (BEL)	Zdeněk Štybar (CZE)	Bart Aernouts (BEL)	Sven Nys (BEL)

=== Scoring system ===
Points are awarded for the first 20 finishers of each race:

Position	1st	2nd	3rd	4th	5th	6th	7th	8th	9th	10th	11th	12th	13th	14th	15th	16th	17th	18th	19th	20th
Points	25	22	19	17	16	15	14	13	12	11	10	9	8	7	6	5	4	3	2	1

On top of that, there is an "intermediate sprint" when passing the finish line at the end of lap two. The first three riders to cross the line receive three, two and one point respectively for first, second and third place.

=== Standings ===
Pos	Name	NAM		OUD		HAS		ESS		LOE		BAA		LIL		OOS		Total Pts
Pos	Name	Race	Sprint	Race	Sprint	Race	Sprint	Race	Sprint	Race	Sprint	Race	Sprint	Race	Sprint	Race	Sprint	Total Pts
1	Sven Nys (BEL)	0	0	25	3	19	2	25	3	22	3	25	3	19	1	17	2	169
2	Zdeněk Štybar (CZE)	25	3	17	0	22	3	0	0	19	0	22	2	22	3	22	3	163
3	Kevin Pauwels (BEL)	19	2	19	0	25	1	19	2	17	2	14	1	25	2	12	0	160
4	Niels Albert (BEL)	0	0	22	2	15	0	16	0	25	0	19	0	17	0	25	0	141
5	Bart Wellens (BEL)	16	0	14	0	17	0	17	1	15	1	16	0	16	0	16	0	129
6	Klaas Vantornout (BEL)	22	1	16	1	0	0	22	0	14	0	17	0	15	0	13	0	121
7	Bart Aernouts (BEL)	17	0	13	0	16	0	14	0	11	0	0	0	0	0	19	0	90
8	Tom Meeusen (BEL)	0	0	11	0	14	0	10	0	13	0	13	0	14	0	11	0	86
9	Rob Peeters (BEL)	10	0	10	0	12	0	12	0	0	0	10	0	11	0	15	1	81
10	Gerben de Knegt (NED)	12	0	15	0	9	0	13	0	0	0	0	0	3	0	14	0	66
11	Sven Vanthourenhout (BEL)	6	0	6	0	0	0	15	0	9	0	6	0	13	0	7	0	62
12	Enrico Franzoi (ITA)	15	0	12	0	8	0	9	0	3	0	12	0	0	0	1	0	60
13	Dieter Vanthourenhout (BEL)	14	0	0	0	11	0	7	0	0	0	0	0	12	0	9	0	53
14	Philipp Walsleben (GER)	11	0	0	0	7	0	0	0	16	0	8	0	1	0	0	0	43
15	Jan Denuwelare (BEL)	7	0	8	0	5	0	0	0	0	0	11	0	10	0	0	0	41
16	Jonathan Page (USA)	0	0	0	0	2	0	0	0	12	0	7	0	7	0	10	0	38
17	Thijs van Amerongen (NED)	0	0	3	0	10	0	11	0	0	0	0	0	0	0	5	0	29
18	Kenneth Van Compernolle (BEL)	3	0	0	0	0	0	0	0	4	0	5	0	9	0	8	0	29
19	Christian Heule (SUI)	0	0	5	0	1	0	5	0	8	0	9	0	0	0	0	0	28
20	Eddy van Ijzendoorn (NED)	0	0	0	0	6	0	8	0	0	0	0	0	5	0	6	0	25
21	Tom Van den Bosch (BEL)	5	0	9	0	3	0	2	0	0	0	1	0	0	0	0	0	20
22	Petr Dlask (CZE)	0	0	4	0	0	0	4	0	6	0	3	0	2	0	0	0	19
23	Thijs Al (NED)	0	0	0	0	0	0	6	0	0	0	2	0	8	0	3	0	19
24	Radomír Šimůnek (CZE)	0	0	0	0	13	0	3	0	0	0	0	0	0	0	0	0	16
25	Mariusz Gil (POL)	4	0	7	0	4	0	0	0	1	0	0	0	0	0	0	0	16
26	Martin Zlámalík (CZE)	0	0	0	0	0	0	0	0	0	0	15	0	0	0	0	0	15
27	Francis Mourey (FRA)	13	0	0	0	0	0	0	0	0	0	0	0	0	0	2	0	15
28	Marco Bianco (ITA)	0	0	1	0	0	0	0	0	5	0	0	0	4	0	4	0	14
29	Lars Boom (NED)	0	0	0	0	0	0	0	0	10	0	0	0	0	0	0	0	10
30	Robert Gavenda (SVK)	9	0	0	0	0	0	0	0	0	0	0	0	0	0	0	0	9
31	Ben Berden (BEL)	2	0	0	0	0	0	1	0	0	0	0	0	6	0	0	0	9
32	Ian Field (GBR)	8	0	0	0	0	0	0	0	0	0	0	0	0	0	0	0	8
33	Nicolas Bazin (FRA)	0	0	0	0	0	0	0	0	7	0	0	0	0	0	0	0	7
34	Davy Commeyne (BEL)	0	0	0	0	0	0	0	0	0	0	4	0	0	0	0	0	4
35	Romain Villa (FRA)	0	0	2	0	0	0	0	0	0	0	0	0	0	0	0	0	2
36	Marcel Wildhaber (SUI)	0	0	0	0	0	0	0	0	2	0	0	0	0	0	0	0	2
37	Patrick Van Leeuwen (NED)	1	0	0	0	0	0	0	0	0	0	0	0	0	0	0	0	1
Pos	Name	NAM		OUD		HAS		ESS		LOE		BAA		LIL		OOS		Total Pts
