= 2010–11 Cyclo-cross Superprestige =

Details
- Dates: 10 October 2010 – 12 February 2011
- Location: Belgium and Netherlands
- Races: 8

Champions
- Male individual champion: Sven Nys (BEL)

The 2010–11 Cyclo-cross Superprestige events and season-long competition takes place between 10 October 2010 and 12 February 2011.

== Results ==
Date	Venue	Winner	Second	Third	Classification Leader
10 October	(Belgium) Ruddervoorde	Zdeněk Štybar (CZE)	Bart Aernouts (BEL)	Sven Nys (BEL)	Zdeněk Štybar (CZE)
31 October	(Belgium) Zonhoven	Zdeněk Štybar (CZE)	Kevin Pauwels (BEL)	Sven Nys (BEL)	Zdeněk Štybar (CZE)
14 November	(Belgium) Hamme-Zogge	Sven Nys (BEL)	Klaas Vantornout (BEL)	Niels Albert (BEL)	Sven Nys (BEL)
21 November	(Belgium) Asper-Gavere	Sven Nys (BEL)	Kevin Pauwels (BEL)	Niels Albert (BEL)	Sven Nys (BEL)
28 November	(Netherlands) Gieten	Tom Meeusen (BEL)	Radomír Šimůnek (CZE)	Sven Vanthourenhout (BEL)	Sven Nys (BEL)
27 December	(Belgium) Diegem	Niels Albert (BEL)	Sven Nys (BEL)	Zdeněk Štybar (CZE)	Sven Nys (BEL)
6 February	(Belgium) Hoogstraten	Sven Nys (BEL)	Niels Albert (BEL)	Kevin Pauwels (BEL)	Sven Nys (BEL)
12 February	(Belgium) Middelkerke	Klaas Vantornout (BEL)	Kevin Pauwels (BEL)	Bart Wellens (BEL)	Sven Nys (BEL)

=== Standings ===
In each race, the top 15 riders gain points, going from 15 points for the winner decreasing by one point per position to 1 point for the rider finishing in 15th position. In case of ties in the total score of two or more riders, the result of the last race counts as decider. If this is not decisive because two or more riders scored no points, the penultimate race counts, and so on until there is a difference.

Pos	Name	Tot	RUD	ZON	H-Z	A-G	GIE	DIE	HGS	MID
1	Sven Nys (BEL)	107	13	13	15	15	12	14	15	10
2	Kevin Pauwels (BEL)	93	8	14	9	14	11	9	13	14
3	Zdeněk Štybar (CZE)	85	15	15	10	11	0	13	10	11
4	Niels Albert (BEL)	84	9	11	13	13	0	15	14	9
5	Bart Wellens (BEL)	77	11	10	12	12	0	11	8	13
6	Klaas Vantornout (BEL)	62	7	0	14	10	4	0	12	15
7	Tom Meeusen (BEL)	56	6	9	0	9	15	0	5	12
8	Sven Vanthourenhout (BEL)	54	10	0	5	0	13	8	11	7
9	Bart Aernouts (BEL)	53	14	12	6	8	9	0	0	4
10	Gerben de Knegt (NED)	42	0	5	8	7	8	6	7	1
11	Rob Peeters (BEL)	40	2	7	11	3	0	12	0	5
12	Jan Denuwelare (BEL)	24	0	0	7	1	3	7	0	6
13	Philipp Walsleben (GER)	22	4	8	0	0	0	10	0	0
14	Kenneth Van Compernolle (BEL)	21	0	0	4	5	0	0	9	3
15	Enrico Franzoi (ITA)	20	5	6	0	0	6	3	0	0
16	Dieter Vanthourenhout (BEL)	17	3	2	0	0	0	0	4	8
17	Steve Chainel (FRA)	17	12	0	0	0	0	5	0	0
18	Thijs van Amerongen (NED)	17	0	4	2	6	5	0	0	0
19	Radomír Šimůnek (CZE)	14	0	0	0	0	14	0	0	0
20	Jonathan Page (USA)	11	1	0	0	2	0	0	6	2
21	Eddy van Ijzendoorn (NED)	11	0	1	0	0	10	0	0	0
22	Mariusz Gil (POL)	8	0	0	0	0	7	1	0	0
23	Petr Dlask (CZE)	5	0	0	3	0	0	0	2	0
24	Martin Zlámalík (CZE)	4	0	0	0	0	0	4	0	0
25	Timothy Johnson (USA)	4	0	0	0	4	0	0	0	0
26	Christian Heule (SUI)	3	0	0	0	0	0	0	3	0
27	Jan Verstraeten (BEL)	3	0	3	0	0	0	0	0	0
28	Thijs Al (NED)	2	0	0	1	0	0	0	1	0
29	John Gadret (FRA)	2	0	0	0	0	0	2	0	0
30	Sascha Weber (GER)	2	0	0	0	0	2	0	0	0
31	Tom Van den Bosch (BEL)	1	0	0	0	0	1	0	0	0
Pos	Name	Tot	RUD	ZON	H-Z	A-G	GIE	DIE	HGS	MID
