= 2008–09 Cyclo-cross Gazet van Antwerpen =

The 2008–2009 Cyclo-cross Gazet van Antwerpen takes place between 1 November 2008 and 22 February 2009.

== Men results ==
Date	Venue	Winner	Second	Third
1 November	(Belgium) Oudenaarde	(Belgium) Sven Nys	(Netherlands) Lars Boom	(Belgium) Niels Albert
11 November	(Belgium) Niel	(Netherlands) Lars Boom	(Belgium) Niels Albert	(Belgium) Sven Nys
22 November	(Belgium) Hasselt	(Belgium) Bart Wellens	(Belgium) Kevin Pauwels	(Belgium) Rob Peeters
13 December	(Belgium) Essen	(Belgium) Sven Nys	(Czech Republic) Zdeněk Štybar	(Netherlands) Thijs Al
30 December	(Belgium) Loenhout	(Czech Republic) Zdeněk Štybar	(Belgium) Sven Nys	(Czech Republic) Radomír Šimůnek
1 January	(Belgium) Baal	(Belgium) Sven Nys	(Czech Republic) Zdeněk Štybar	(Belgium) Niels Albert
7 February	(Belgium) Lille	(Belgium) Niels Albert	(Belgium) Sven Nys	(Belgium) Bart Wellens
22 February	(Belgium) Oostmalle	(Belgium) Sven Nys	(Belgium) Niels Albert	(Belgium) Sven Vanthourenhout

== See also ==
- 2008–2009 UCI Cyclo-cross World Cup
- 2008–2009 Cyclo-cross Superprestige
