= 2006–07 UCI Cyclo-cross World Cup =

Bicycle racing competition

The 2006–2007 UCI Cyclo-cross World Cup events and season-long competition takes place between 1 October 2006 and 21 January 2007 and is sponsored by the Union Cycliste Internationale (UCI).

== Men results ==
Date	Venue	Winner	Second	Third
1 October	(Switzerland) Aigle	(Belgium) Sven Nys	(Belgium) Bart Wellens	(Belgium) Erwin Vervecken
22 October	(Belgium) Kalmthout	(Belgium) Sven Nys	(France) Francis Mourey	(Belgium) Erwin Vervecken
28 October	(Czech Republic) Tábor	(Czech Republic) Radomir Simunek jr.	(Belgium) Bart Wellens	(Belgium) Erwin Vervecken
4 November	(Italy) Treviso	(France) Francis Mourey	(Belgium) Sven Nys	(Belgium) Erwin Vervecken
12 November	(Netherlands) Pijnacker	(Belgium) Sven Nys	(France) Francis Mourey	(Netherlands) Gerben de Knegt
25 November	(Belgium) Koksijde	(Belgium) Sven Nys	(Belgium) Bart Wellens	(Belgium) Sven Vanthourenhout
3 December	(Spain) Igorre	(Belgium) Sven Nys	(Belgium) Bart Wellens	(Belgium) Klaas Vantornout
8 December	(Italy) Milan	(Belgium) Bart Wellens	(Belgium) Sven Nys	(Belgium) Sven Vanthourenhout
26 December	(Belgium) Hofstade	(Belgium) Erwin Vervecken	(Czech Republic) Petr Dlask	(Netherlands) Thijs Al
14 January	(France) Nommay	(Belgium) Sven Nys	(Belgium) Bart Wellens	(Netherlands) Gerben de Knegt
21 January	(Netherlands) Hoogerheide	(Belgium) Sven Nys	(Czech Republic) Petr Dlask	(Belgium) Erwin Vervecken

== Men rankings ==
Rankings as of 11 December 2006

Pos.	Cyclist	Nation	Points
1.	Sven Nys	Belgium	2650
2.	Bart Wellens	Belgium	1944
3.	Gerben de Knegt	Netherlands	1489
4.	Erwin Vervecken	Belgium	1471
5.	Francis Mourey	France	1462
6.	Sven Vanthourenhout	Belgium	1411
7.	Klaas Vantornout	Belgium	1338
8.	Christian Heule	Switzerland	1070
9.	Kevin Pauwels	Belgium	983
10.	John Gadret	France	955

== Women results ==
Date	Venue	Winner	Second	Third
22 October	(Belgium) Kalmthout	(Germany) Hanka Kupfernagel	(Netherlands) Marianne Vos	(United Kingdom) Helen Wyman
4 November	(Italy) Treviso	(Netherlands) Marianne Vos	(Germany) Hanka Kupfernagel	(Germany) Birgit Hollmann
12 November	(Netherlands) Pijnacker	(Germany) Hanka Kupfernagel	(Netherlands) Daphny van den Brand	(Germany) Birgit Hollmann
26 December	(Belgium) Hofstade	(Germany) Hanka Kupfernagel	(Germany) Birgit Hollmann	(Netherlands) Daphny van den Brand
14 January	(France) Nommay	(France) Laurence Leboucher	(France) Maryline Salvetat	(Germany) Hanka Kupfernagel
21 January	(Netherlands) Hoogerheide	(Germany) Hanka Kupfernagel	(Netherlands) Marianne Vos	(United Kingdom) Helen Wyman

== Women rankings ==
Rankings as of 27 December 2006

Pos.	Cyclist	Nation	Points
1.	Hanka Kupfernagel	Germany	895
2.	Marianne Vos	Netherlands	760
3.	Helen Wyman	United Kingdom	640
4.	Laurence Leboucher	France	547
5.	Reza Hormes-Ravenstijn	Netherlands	523
6.	Birgit Hollmann	Germany	480
7.	Veerle Ingels	Belgium	418
8.	Arenda Grimberg	Netherlands	388
9.	Susanne Juranek	Germany	377
10.	Lyne Bessette	Canada	340

== See also ==
- 2006/07 Cyclo-cross Superprestige
- 2006/07 Cyclo-cross Gazet van Antwerpen
