= 2008–09 UCI Cyclo-cross World Cup =

Bicycle racing competition

The 2008–2009 UCI Cyclo-cross World Cup events and season-long competition took place between 19 October 2008 and 25 January 2009 and is sponsored by the Union Cycliste Internationale (UCI). Nine events were organised, the same as the 2007–2008 UCI Cyclo-cross World Cup, although the events in Liévin and Hoogerheide were replaced with Nommay, a former World Cup race, and Roubaix, which was first held in 2006. Hoogerheide hosts the 2009 UCI Cyclo-cross World Championships.

== Events ==
Date	Venue	Elite men's winner	Elite women's winner
19 October	(Belgium) Kalmthout	Sven Nys (BEL)	Daphny van den Brand (NED)
26 October	(Czech Republic) Tábor	Niels Albert (BEL)	Hanka Kupfernagel (GER)
9 November	(Netherlands) Pijnacker	Lars Boom (NED)	Hanka Kupfernagel (GER)
29 November	(Belgium) Koksijde	Erwin Vervecken (BEL)	Katie Compton (USA)
7 December	(Spain) Igorre	Sven Nys (BEL)	No UCI World cup race
21 December	(France) Nommay	Lars Boom (NED)	Katie Compton (USA)
26 December	(Belgium) Heusden-Zolder	Thijs Al (NED)	Marianne Vos (NED)
18 January	(France) Roubaix	Erwin Vervecken (BEL)	Katie Compton (USA)
25 January	(Italy) Milan	Sven Nys (BEL)	No UCI World cup race

== See also ==
- 2008–2009 Cyclo-cross Superprestige
- 2008–2009 Cyclo-cross Gazet van Antwerpen
