= 2007–08 Cyclo-cross Superprestige =

Details
- Dates: 14 October 2007 – 16 February 2008
- Location: Belgium and Netherlands
- Races: 8

Champions
- Male individual champion: Sven Nys (BEL)

The 2007–08 Cyclo-cross Superprestige events and season-long competition takes place between 14 October 2007 and 16 February 2008. Eight events are organised.

== Results ==
=== Men ===
Date	Venue	Winner	Second	Third
14 October	(Belgium) Ruddervoorde	Sven Nys (BEL)	Zdeněk Štybar (CZE)	Bart Wellens (BEL)
4 November	(Belgium) Hamme-Zogge	Sven Nys (BEL)	Zdeněk Štybar (CZE)	Bart Wellens (BEL)
18 November	(Belgium) Asper-Gavere	Sven Nys (BEL)	Francis Mourey (FRA)	Bart Wellens (BEL)
25 November	(Netherlands) Gieten	Niels Albert (BEL)	Sven Nys (BEL)	Lars Boom (NED)
9 December	(Netherlands) Veghel-Eerde	Sven Nys (BEL)	Niels Albert (BEL)	Bart Wellens (BEL)
30 December	(Belgium) Diegem	Sven Nys (BEL)	Radomír Šimůnek Jr. (CZE)	Zdeněk Štybar (CZE)
3 February	(Belgium) Hoogstraten	Niels Albert (BEL)	Zdeněk Štybar (CZE)	Sven Vanthourenhout (BEL)
16 February	(Belgium) Vorselaar	Niels Albert (BEL)	Radomír Šimůnek Jr. (CZE)	Sven Vanthourenhout (BEL)

== See also ==
- 2007–2008 UCI Cyclo-cross World Cup
- 2007–2008 Cyclo-cross Gazet van Antwerpen
