= Kersttrofee Hofstade =

Cyclo-cross race held in Hofstade, Belgium

The Plage Cross, formerly Kersttrofee Hofstade (2001-2008), is a cyclo-cross race held in Hofstade, Belgium, which was part of the UCI Cyclo-cross World Cup and is now part of the X²O Badkamers Trophy. The race is held every year during Christmas.

== Past winners ==
Year	Men's winner	Women's winner
2001	Mario De Clercq (BEL)	not held
2002	Richard Groenendaal (NED)	not held
2003	Sven Nys (BEL)	Hanka Kupfernagel (GER)
2004	Sven Nys (BEL)	Hanka Kupfernagel (GER)
2005	Sven Nys (BEL)	Daphny van den Brand (NED)
2006	Erwin Vervecken (BEL)	Hanka Kupfernagel (GER)
2007	Sven Nys (BEL)	Maryline Salvetat (FRA)
2008	Thijs Al (NED)	Marianne Vos (NED)
2009-2024	not held	not held
2025	Mathieu van der Poel (NED)	Lucinda Brand (NED)
