= 2007–08 UCI Cyclo-cross World Cup =

Bicycle racing competition

The 2007–2008 UCI Cyclo-cross World Cup events and season-long competition takes place between 21 October 2007 and 20 January 2008 and is sponsored by the Union Cycliste Internationale (UCI). Nine events are organised, a reduction of two from the 2006/07 UCI Cyclo-cross World Cup. In addition, not all events have races for each category, so that there are 8 rounds for elite men, 7 for elite women, and 5 for under-23 and junior men. Individual classifications for elite men and women were discontinued after the previous season, with more emphasis put on the UCI classifications.

== Events ==
Date	Venue	Elite men's winner	Elite women' winner
21 October	(Belgium) Kalmthout	Zdeněk Štybar (CZE)	Daphny van den Brand (NED)
27 October	(Czech Republic) Tábor	Sven Nys (BEL)	No UCI World cup race
11 November	(Netherlands) Pijnacker	Lars Boom (NED)	Katie Compton (USA)
24 November	(Belgium) Koksijde	Sven Nys (BEL)	Daphny van den Brand (NED)
2 December	(Spain) Igorre	Sven Nys (BEL)	No UCI World cup race
8 December	(Italy) Milan	No UCI World cup race	Daphny van den Brand (NED)
26 December	(Belgium) Hofstade	Sven Nys (BEL)	Maryline Salvetat (FRA)
13 January	(France) Liévin	Lars Boom (NED)	Hanka Kupfernagel (GER)
20 January	(Netherlands) Hoogerheide	Lars Boom (NED)	Hanka Kupfernagel (GER)

== See also ==
- 2007–08 Cyclo-cross Superprestige
- 2007–08 Cyclo-cross Gazet van Antwerpen
