= Olga Wasiuk =

Polish cyclist

Personal information
- Born: 22 January 1987 (age 39)

Cycling career
- Sport: Cycling
- Discipline: Cyclo-cross
- Role: Rider

Amateur team
- 2012: HP–Sferis

Olga Wasiuk (born 22 January 1987) is a Polish cyclo-cross cyclist. She represented her nation in the women's elite event at the 2016 UCI Cyclo-cross World Championships in Heusden-Zolder.
