= Dieter Vanthourenhout =

Belgian cyclist

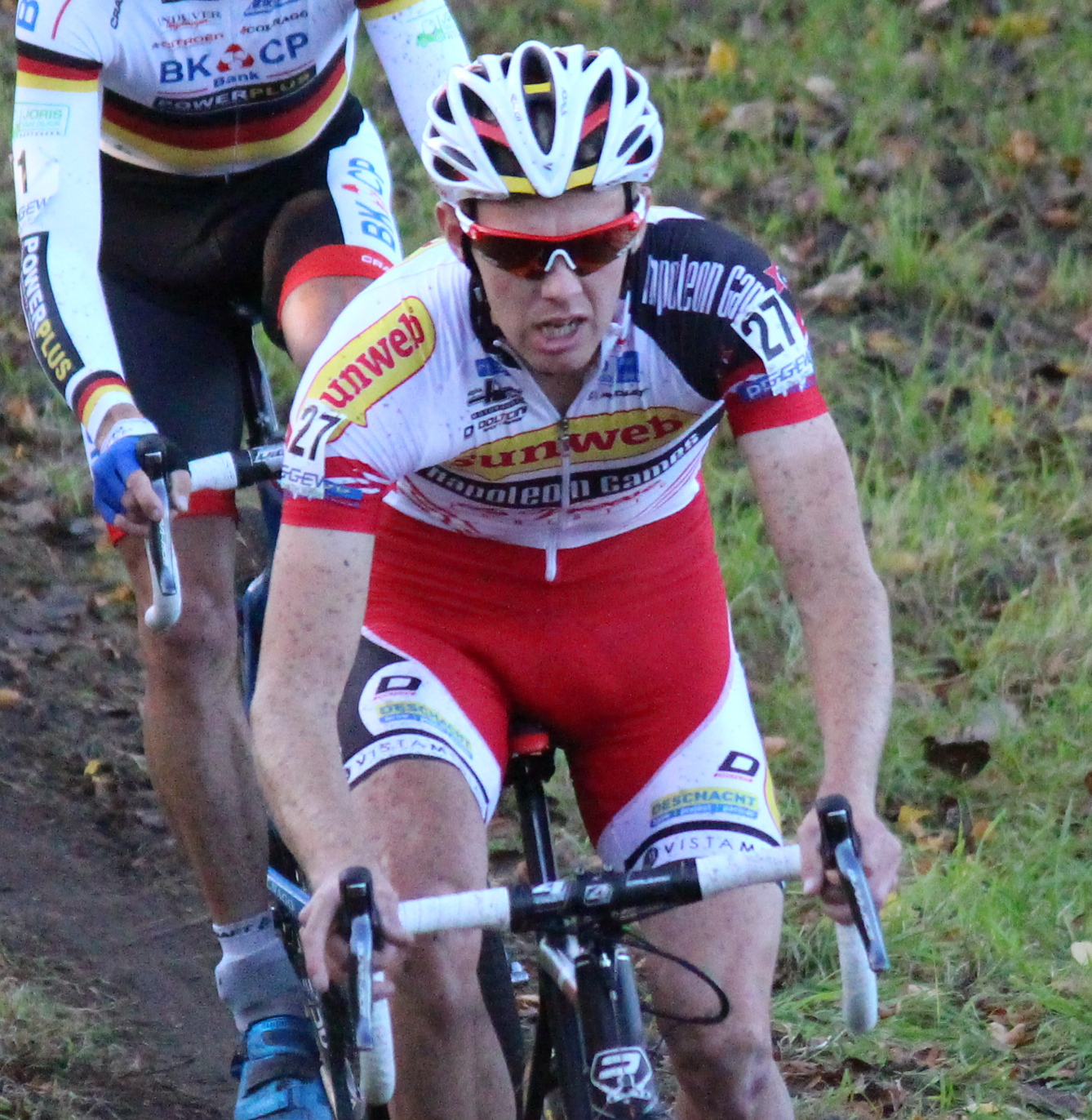

Personal information
- Full name: Dieter Vanthourenhout
- Born: 20 June 1985 (age 41) Bruges, Belgium
- Height: 1.8 m (5 ft 11 in)
- Weight: 64 kg (141 lb)

Cycling career
- Sport: Cycling
- Current team: Retired
- Disciplines: Cyclo-cross; Road
- Role: Rider

Professional teams
- 2007–2008: Style & Concept–Easypay
- 2008–2013: Palmans–Cras
- 2014–2020: Sunweb–Napoleon Games

Dieter Vanthourenhout (born 20 June 1985 in Bruges) is a Belgian former professional racing cyclist. He is the brother of racing cyclist Michael Vanthourenhout.

Vanthourenhout retired from cycling at the end of 2020, after 14 years as a professional.

== Major results ==
=== Cyclo-cross ===
2000–2001
1st National Cadet Championships
2002–2003
1st National Junior Championships
2004–2005
UCI Under-23 World Cup

3rd Pijnacker

3rd Hoogerheide Under-23
2005–2006
Under-23 Superprestige

2nd Diegem
3rd Ruddervoorde

3rd National Under-23 Championships
UCI Under-23 World Cup

3rd Hooglede-Gits

2006–2007
UCI Under-23 World Cup

1st Pijnacker

1st Hasselt Under-23
1st Oudenaarde Under-23
2nd Lille Under-23
2nd Leudelange
Under-23 Superprestige

3rd Vorselaar
3rd Sint-Michielsgestel

3rd National Under-23 Championships
3rd Dudzele
3rd Zonhoven Under-23
2007–2008
3rd Sint-Niklaas
2008–2009
1st Contern
3rd Ardooie
3rd Harderwijk
2009–2010
1st Bredene
2nd Eeklo
3rd Sint-Niklaas
3rd Erpe-Mere
2010–2011
Superprestige

3rd Gieten

3rd Eeklo
3rd Harderwijk
UCI World Cup

5th Aigle

2011–2012
2nd Zonnebeke
3rd Antwerp
3rd Ardooie
3rd Bredene
3rd Otegem
3rd Woerden
2012–2013
3rd Woerden
2014–2015
1st Lorsch
2015–2016
1st Bredene
1st Lorsch
1st Contern
1st Illnau
EKZ CrossTour

2nd Dielsdorf

2nd La Mézière
3rd Pierric
2016–2017
2nd Contern
3rd Woerden
2017–2018
1st Leudelange
3rd Rucphen
2018–2019
2nd Vic
2nd Manlleu
2nd Illnau
EKZ CrossTour

3rd Baden

2019–2020
2nd Vic
2nd Vittel Day 1
2nd Boulzicourt
3rd Overall EKZ CrossTour

3rd Hittnau
3rd Aigle

3rd Karrantza
3rd Les Franqueses del Vallès
3rd Manlleu
3rd Vittel Day 2
2020–2021
3rd Steinmaur

=== Road ===
2009
7th Omloop der Kempen
2011
7th Omloop der Kempen
9th Dwars door het Hageland
2013
5th Omloop der Kempen
