= Kasteelcross Zonnebeke =

Belgian cyclo-cross race

Race details
- Region: Zonnebeke, Belgium
- English name: Castle cross Zonnebeke
- Discipline: Cyclo-cross

History
- First edition: 1987
- Editions: 35 (as of 2024)
- First winner: Johan Ghyllebert (BEL)
- Most wins: Paul Herygers (BEL) (4 wins)
- Most recent: Michael Vanthourenhout (BEL)

The Kasteelcross Zonnebeke is a cyclo-cross race held in Zonnebeke, Belgium every January.

== Past winners ==
=== Men ===
Year	Winner	Team
2024	(Belgium) Michael Vanthourenhout	Pauwels Sauzen–Bingoal
2023	(Belgium) Tim Merlier	Soudal–Quick-Step
2021–2022	not held due to the COVID-19 pandemic in Belgium	
2020	(Netherlands) Mathieu van der Poel	Alpecin–Fenix
2019	(Belgium) Kevin Pauwels	Pauwels Sauzen–Bingoal
2018	(Belgium) Wietse Bosmans	
2017	(Belgium) Wietse Bosmans	
2016	(Netherlands) Mathieu van der Poel	
2015	(Belgium) Wout van Aert	
2014	(Belgium) Sven Nys	
2013	(Belgium) Tom Meeusen	
2012	(Belgium) Rob Peeters	
2011	(Belgium) Rob Peeters	Telenet–Fidea
2010	(Belgium) Sven Nys	Landbouwkrediet
2009	(Belgium) Jan Denuwelare	
2008	(Belgium) Bart Wellens	Fidea
2007	(Belgium) Sven Vanthourenhout	Sunweb-Pro Job
2006	(Belgium) Sven Vanthourenhout	Rabobank
2005	(Belgium) Sven Vanthourenhout	Rabobank
2004	(Belgium) Tom Vannoppen	Mr.Bookmaker–Palmans
2003	(Belgium) Sven Vanthourenhout	Quick-Step–Davitamon
2001	(Belgium) Mario De Clercq	Domo–Farm Frites
2000	(Netherlands) Richard Groenendaal	Rabobank
1999	(Belgium) Sven Nys	Rabobank
1998	(Belgium) Mario De Clercq	Palmans–Ideal
1997	(Belgium) Marc Janssens	Palmans–Lystex
1996	(Belgium) Paul Herijgers	Tönissteiner–Saxon
1995	(Belgium) Paul Herijgers	Tönissteiner–Saxon
1994	(Belgium) Paul Herijgers	Saxon–Selle Italia
1993	(Belgium) Paul Herijgers	Saxon–Breitex
1992	(Belgium) Paul Herijgers	Saxon
1991	(Belgium) Peter Willemsens	
1990	(Belgium) Ludo De Rey	
1989	(Belgium) Guy Vandijck	
1988	(Belgium) Johan Ghyllebert	
1987	(Belgium) Johan Ghyllebert	

=== Women ===
Year	Winner	Team
2024	(Belgium) Marion Norbert-Riberolle	
2023	(Netherlands) Denise Betsema	
2021–2022	not held due to the COVID-19 pandemic in Belgium	
2020	(Luxembourg) Christine Majerus	
2019	(Belgium) Loes Sels	
2018	(Netherlands) Thalita de Jong	
2017	(Netherlands) Thalita de Jong	
2016	(Belgium) Jolien Verschueren	
