= Trofeo Mamma & Papà Guerciotti =

The Trofeo Mamma & Papà Guerciotti is a cyclo-cross race held in Milan, Italy, which was part of the UCI Cyclo-cross World Cup.

== Past winners ==
Year	Men's winner	Women's winner
2008	not held	not held
2007	not held	(Netherlands) Daphny van den Brand
2006	(Belgium) Bart Wellens	not held
2005	(Belgium) Sven Nys	(Netherlands) Daphny van den Brand
2004	(Belgium) Sven Nys	(Netherlands) Daphny van den Brand
2003	(Belgium) Bart Wellens	(Germany) Hanka Kupfernagel
2002	(Italy) Daniele Pontoni	not held
2001	(Italy) Enrico Franzoi	not held
2000	(Italy) Daniele Pontoni	not held
1999	(Italy) Daniele Pontoni	not held
1998	(Italy) Daniele Pontoni	not held
1997	(Belgium) Mario De Clercq	not held
1996	(Netherlands) Adrie van der Poel	not held
1995	(Italy) Daniele Pontoni	not held
1994	(Czech Republic) Radomir Simunek sr.	not held
1993	(Italy) Daniele Pontoni	not held
1992	(Italy) Daniele Pontoni	not held
1991	(Italy) Daniele Pontoni	not held
1990	(Czechoslovakia) Radovan Fort	not held
1989	(Denmark) Henrik Djernis	not held
1988	(Denmark) Henrik Djernis	not held
1987	(West Germany) Mike Kluge	not held
1986	(West Germany) Mike Kluge	not held
1985	(Belgium) Roland Liboton	not held
1984	(Belgium) Roland Liboton	not held
1983	(Italy) Vito Di Tano	not held
1982	(Italy) Ottavio Paccagnella	not held
1981	(Netherlands) Hennie Stamsnijder	not held
1980	(Belgium) Roland Liboton	not held
1979	(Italy) Franco Vagneur	not held
1978	(Italy) Vito Di Tano	not held
