= Grand Prix van Hasselt =

Race details
- Date: November
- Region: Hasselt, Belgium
- Discipline: Cyclo-cross
- Competition: BPost Bank Trophy

History
- First edition: 2005
- Editions: 14 (as of 2018)
- First winner: Sven Nys (BEL)
- Most wins: Sven Nys (BEL) (5 wins)
- Most recent: Kevin Pauwels (BEL)

The Grand Prix van Hasselt is a cyclo-cross race held in Hasselt, Belgium, which was part of the BPost Bank Trophy until 2014 but has since become part of the Soudal Classics.

== Past winners ==
=== Men ===
| Year | Winner |
|---|---|
| 2018 | (Belgium) Kevin Pauwels |
| 2017 | (Netherlands) Corné van Kessel |
| 2016 | (Belgium) Laurens Sweeck |
| 2015 | (Belgium) Sven Nys |
| 2014 | (Belgium) Kevin Pauwels |
| 2013 | (Belgium) Sven Nys |
| 2012 | (Belgium) Sven Nys |
| 2011 | (Belgium) Kevin Pauwels |
| 2010 | (Belgium) Kevin Pauwels |
| 2009 | (Czech Republic) Zdeněk Štybar |
| 2008 | (Belgium) Bart Wellens |
| 2007 | (Belgium) Sven Nys |
| 2006 | (Netherlands) Gerben de Knegt |
| 2005 | (Belgium) Sven Nys |

=== Women ===
| Year | Winner |
|---|---|
| 2018 | (Belgium) Ellen Van Loy |
| 2017 | (Belgium) Loes Sels |
| 2016 | (Belgium) Sanne Cant |
| 2015 | (Belgium) Sanne Cant |
| 2014 | (Belgium) Sanne Cant |
| 2013 | (Belgium) Sanne Cant |
