= Cyclo-cross Kalmthout =

The Cyclo-cross Kalmthout is a cyclo-cross race held in Kalmthout, Belgium. First held in 1991 under the name "Grote prijs industrie Bosduin", this race was a part of the UCI Cyclo-cross World Cup in 1999, 2002 and 2005 till 2010. In the 2011-2012 season, it was replaced by Namen.

== Past winners ==
Year	Men's winner	Women's winner
2013	(Belgium) Kevin Pauwels	(Belgium) Sanne Cant
2012	(Belgium) Sven Nys	(Belgium) Sanne Cant
2011	(Belgium) Niels Albert	(Netherlands) Sanne Van Paassen
2010	(Belgium) Tom Meeusen	(United States) Katie Compton
2009	(Belgium) Sven Nys	(Netherlands) Daphny van den Brand
2008	(Belgium) Sven Nys	(Netherlands) Daphny van den Brand
2007	(Czech Republic) Zdeněk Štybar	(Netherlands) Daphny van den Brand
2006	(Belgium) Sven Nys	(Germany) Hanka Kupfernagel
2005	(Belgium) Sven Nys	(Netherlands) Daphny van den Brand
2004	(Belgium) Sven Nys	(Netherlands) Daphny van den Brand
2003	(Belgium) Bart Wellens	(Netherlands) Daphny van den Brand
2002	(Netherlands) Richard Groenendaal	not held
2001	(Belgium) Bart Wellens	not held
2000	(Belgium) Sven Nys	not held
1999	(Belgium) Bart Wellens	not held
1998	(Belgium) Bart Wellens	not held
1997	(Netherlands) Richard Groenendaal	not held
1996	(Netherlands) Adrie van der Poel	not held
1995	(Belgium) Peter Willemsens	not held
1994	(Belgium) Paul Herygers	not held
1993	(Belgium) Danny De Bie	not held
1992	(Belgium) Paul Herygers	not held
1991	(Belgium) Danny De Bie	not held
