= De Vlaamse Trofee Deschacht =

De Vlaamse Trofee Deschacht also called Grand Prix Fidea after its sponsor is a cyclo-cross race held in Vorselaar, Belgium, which is part of the Superprestige.

== Past winners ==
Year	winner
2008	(Belgium) Niels Albert
2007	(Belgium) Sven Nys
2006	(Belgium) Sven Nys
2005	(Belgium) Sven Nys
2004	(Belgium) Sven Nys
2003	(Belgium) Bart Wellens
2002	(Netherlands) Richard Groenendaal
2000	(Belgium) Bart Wellens
