= Sven Nys =

Belgian cyclist (born 1976)

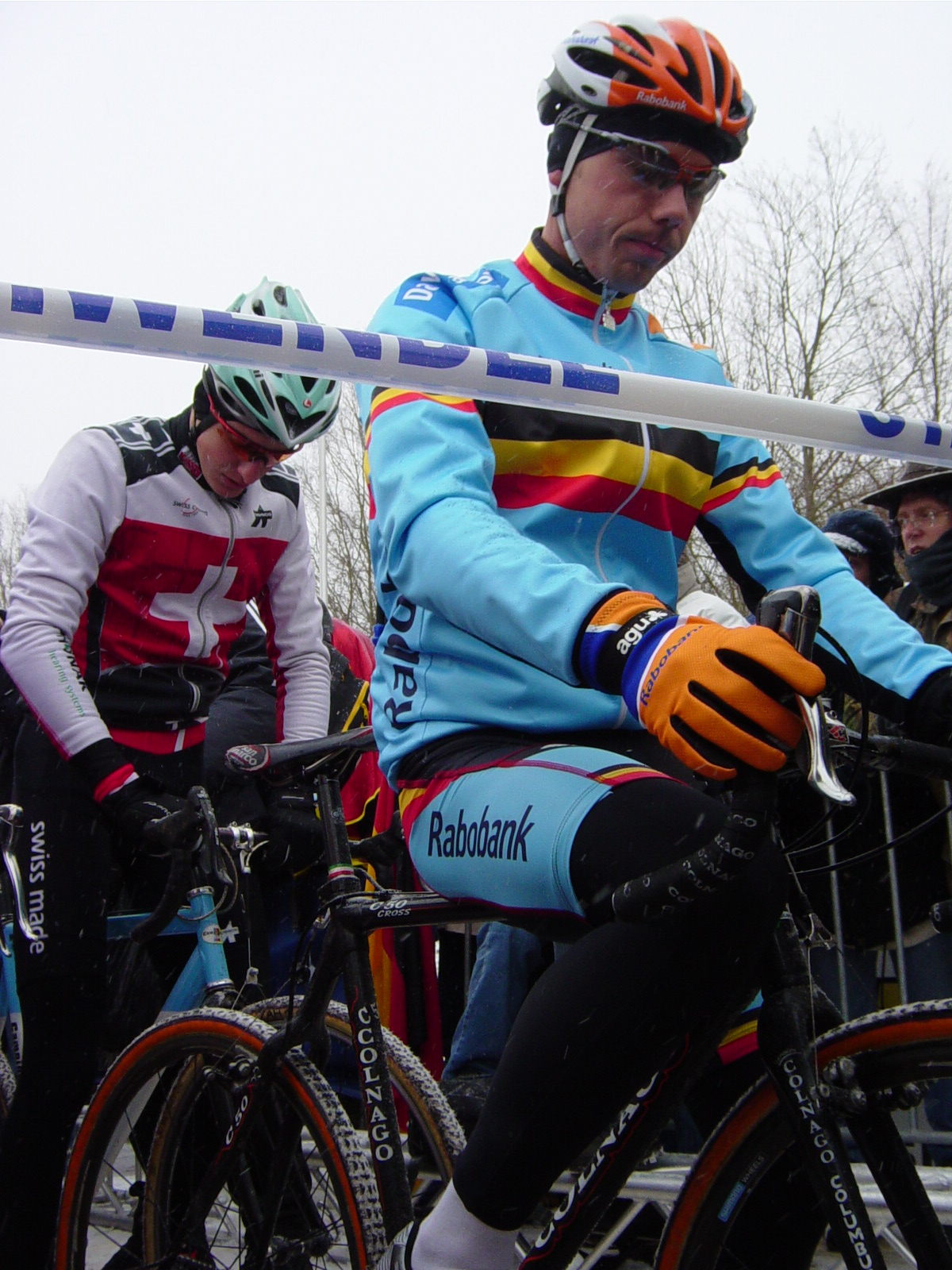
- Nys, 2005 UCI World CX Championships.

Personal information
- Full name: Sven Nys
- Nicknames: The Cannibal from Baal (in Dutch) De Kannibaal van Baal
- Born: 17 June 1976 (age 50) Bonheiden, Belgium
- Height: 1.81 m (5 ft 11 in)
- Weight: 72 kg (159 lb)

Cycling career
- Sport: Cycling
- Current team: Baloise Verzekeringen–Het Poetsbureau Lions
- Disciplines: Cyclo-cross; Mountain bike Road
- Role: Rider (retired); Team manager

Amateur team
- 2014–2016: Crelan–AA Drink

Professional teams
- 1998–2008: Rabobank
- 2008–2013: Landbouwkrediet–Tönissteiner

Managerial team
- 2016–: Telenet–Fidea Lions

Major wins
- Cyclo-cross World Championships (2005, 2013) National Championships (2000, 2003, 2005, 2006, 2008–2010, 2012, 2014) World Cup (1999–2000, 2001–02, 2004–05, 2005–06, 2006–07, 2008–09) 50 individual wins (1998–99—2009–10, 2011–12, 2012–13, 2015–16) Superprestige (1999–2000, 2002–03, 2005–06, 2006–07, 2007–08, 2008–09, 2010–11, 2011–12, 2012–13, 2013–14) Trophy (2002–03, 2004–05, 2005–06, 2006–07, 2007–08, 2008–09, 2009–10, 2010–11, 2013–14) Mountain bike National Championships (2005, 2007, 2013, 2014, 2015)
Medal record
Representing Belgium
Men's cyclo-cross
World Championships
Gold medal – first place	Sankt Wendel 2005	Elite
Gold medal – first place	Louisville 2013	Elite
Gold medal – first place	Munich 1997	Under-23
Gold medal – first place	Middelfart 1998	Under-23
Silver medal – second place	Sankt Wendel 2011	Elite
Silver medal – second place	Hoogerheide 2014	Elite
Bronze medal – third place	Sint-Michielsgestel 2000	Elite
Bronze medal – third place	Zolder 2002	Elite
Bronze medal – third place	Treviso 2008	Elite
Bronze medal – third place	Hoogerheide 2009	Elite
Bronze medal – third place	Tábor 2010	Elite

Sven Nys (Dutch: [sfɛˈnɛis]; born 17 June 1976) is a Belgian former professional cyclist competing in cyclo-cross and mountain bike. With two world championships, seven world cups, and over 140 competitive victories, he is considered one of the best cyclo-cross racers of his generation, and remains a prominent figure in cyclo-cross. Apart from cyclo-cross, Nys is also fivefold national mountainbike champion, and has competed in that discipline in two Olympic games.

== Career overview ==
=== Early years ===
Born in Bonheiden, Belgium, Nys began racing BMX at the age of 8. He won eight BMX national titles before switching to cyclocross, a more popular sport in Belgium. He won the under-23 world championship in 1997 and 1998, beating another Belgian, Bart Wellens. Nys moved to the elite category in 1998–1999, joining the Dutch Rabobank team.

=== Becoming elite ===
In the elite class he won the Superprestige competition and came third in the national championships. The next season, he won the Superprestige again, ended the World Cup as leader and became Belgian champion. This made him favourite for the 2000 world championship. But his Rabobank management told him not to beat his teammate, the Dutchman Richard Groenendaal. Groenendaal sprinted away from the start and Nys was forced to hold back and not help another Belgian, Mario De Clercq, chase him. Groenendaal won and Nys, who came third, was heavily criticised in Belgium for choosing team over country. The Royal Belgian Cycling League demanded an explanation. It became more forgiving but the head coach, Erik De Vlaeminck, remained unconvinced.

Nys blamed an injury for not winning a season-long competition or championship in 2000–2001. A year later he won the World Cup and the Superprestige again. In the world championships that year he came third after being outsprinted by De Clercq and Tom Vannoppen. The following season Nys won the Superprestige for the fourth time as well as the Gazet van Antwerpen trophy for a first time. He became Belgian champion again, but Wellens won the world championship and the World Cup.

Wellens dominated 2003–2004. Nys' chance for the World Cup ended when other Belgians sprinted past him, taking points. Nys was angry that his countrymen had allowed Groenendaal, a Dutchman, to win the World Cup rather than him. That evening Nys decided from then on to ride for himself.

This is war. Thanks Vannoppen, thanks Van der Linden. This is the last thing I have done for the Belgian team. They can all go to hell. [...] Apparently there are some who take joy out of me not winning the World Cup. I know who and will take that into account next year. National team coach Rudy De Bie told me that he has never seen anything like this before. Our country loses the World Cup today.

— Sven Nys, after the Pijnacker race, translated from Dutch

=== The cannibal ===
Nys won everything of importance and at the end of 2004–2005 won the national and world championships, ended number one in the UCI rankings and World Cup, the Superprestige and the Gazet van Antwerpen Trophy. He is the only cyclo-crosser to achieve such dominance. Nys came close to repeating the feat the following season but he gave up in the world championship after a fall on the last lap.

Nys won all eight Superprestige races in 2006–2007. In the Superprestige he won 13 races from Hoogstraten in 2005 to Asper Gaver in 2007. That season he won the World Cup and the Gazet van Antwerpen trophy again, but neither the national or world championship. The national involved a lot of running, not Nys' talent, and were won by Wellens. At the world championship in Hooglede-Gits Nys fell three times: over Wellens, who fell because a television motor had hit one of the road markers; over Erwin Vervecken; and because of an error of his own. He finished 11th.

The following season, Nys won the World Cup, the Superprestige and the Gazet van Anterwerpen trophy again. He also won his fifth national championship. The Dutchman Lars Boom became champion of the world and Zdeněk Štybar took the silver, both barely 22 at the time. Nys, already nearing 32, came third.

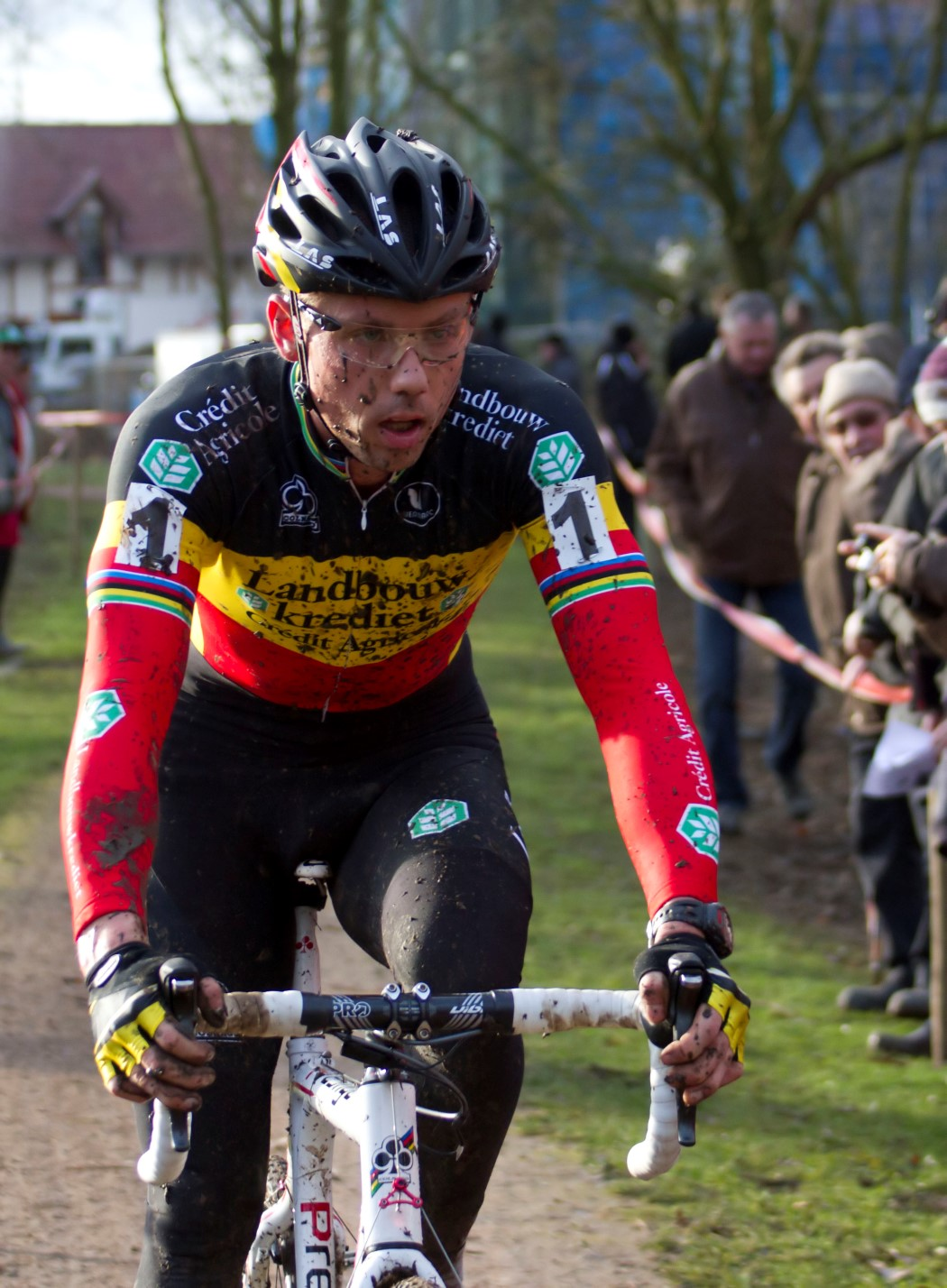
Nys riding in the 2012 Kasteelcross Zonnebeke

Nys switched teams from Rabobank to Landbouwkrediet-Tönissteiner. Niels Albert, 2008's U23 world champion, joined the elite category that season, giving Nys another opponent. But Nys won all the season-long competitions and the national championship. Albert won the world championship, Štybar was second and Nys third. The Belgian press referred to Albert, Štybar and Nys as De Grote Drie (The Big Three), it was clear that Nys' years of absolute domination were behind him.

In his second mountain bike race Nys won the Belgian championship and then came ninth at the Olympic Games in 2008. On 31 December 2006 Nys won his 150th race with the elites, at Diegem. Four years later, he scored his 300th career win at the Koppenbergcross, one of the toughest races in the season.

Nys was appointed as a member of the inaugural UCI Athletes' Commission in 2011.

In 2013 Nys won the world championship a second time. He said his career was now complete.

On 10 February 2013, Nys won his 60th race in the Superprestige.

On 22 November 2015, Nys won the Koksijde round of the UCI Cyclo-cross World Cup in Belgium, his fiftieth victory in the series. His win came seventeen years and a day after his first World Cup victory.

Sven Nys called a halt to his career on 5–6 March 2016 at an event called "Merci Sven" which was held at the Antwerp Sportpaleis (Belgium).

=== Post cycling career ===
After ending his active cyclocross career Nys bought the cyclocross team Telenet–Fidea Lions of which he is the general manager. He is also a motivational speaker, during his keynotes he shares information about his experiences during his cycling career.

== Major results ==
=== Cyclo-cross ===
1996–1997
1st UCI World Under-23 Championships
1997–1998
1st UCI World Under-23 Championships
1998–1999 (13)
UCI World Cup

1st Tábor

1st Overall Superprestige

1st Ruddervoorde
1st Sint-Michielsgestel
1st Gieten
1st Sivelle
1st Diegem
1st Wetzikon

1st Eeklo
1st Zonnebeke
1999–2000 (21)
1st National Championships
1st Overall UCI World Cup

1st Safenwill
1st Leudelange

1st Overall Superprestige

1st Ruddervoorde
1st Gieten
1st Silvelle
1st Hoogstraten
1st Surhuisterveen

Gazet van Antwerpen

1st Rijkevorsel
1st Lille

1st Wetzikon
2000–2001 (6)
UCI World Cup

1st Heusden-Zolder
1st Zeddam

Superprestige

1st Diegem

Gazet van Antwerpen

1st Kalmthout
1st Lille

1st Loenhout
2001–2002 (10)
1st Overall UCI World Cup

1st Monopoli
1st Igorre
1st Wetzikon

1st Overall Superprestige

1st Gavere
1st Gieten

1st Fourmies
1st Harderwijk
1st Oudenaarde
1st Tábor
2002–2003 (17)
1st National Championships
UCI World Cup

1st Liévin
1st Hoogerheide

1st Overall Superprestige

1st Ruddervoorde
1st Sint-Michielsgestel
1st Gieten
1st Hoogstraten
1st Harnes

1st Overall Gazet van Antwerpen

1st Essen
1st Loenhout
1st Baal

1st Dottignies
1st Fourmies
1st Hamme
2003–2004 (10)
UCI World Cup

1st Turin
1st Sankt-Wendel
1st Wetzikon

Superprestige

1st Sint-Michielsgestel
1st Vorselaar

Gazet van Antwerpen

1st Baal

1st Eeklo
1st Hofstade
1st Middelkerke
2004–2005 (25)
1st UCI World Championships
1st National Championships
1st Overall UCI World Cup

1st Pijnacker
1st Wetzikon
1st Milan
1st Hofstade
1st Nommay
1st Hoogerheide
1st Lanarvilly

1st Overall Superprestige

1st Ruddervoorde
1st Gavere
1st Gieten
1st Vorselaar

1st Overall Gazet van Antwerpen

1st Oudenaarde
1st Loenhout
1st Baal
1st Lille
1st Oostmalle

1st Aalter
1st Erpe-Mere
1st Huijbergen
1st Kalmthout
1st Overijse
1st Woerden
2005–2006 (27)
1st National Championships
1st Overall UCI World Cup

1st Kalmthout
1st Tábor
1st Pijnacker
1st Wetzikon
1st Milan
1st Hofstade
1st Hooglede
1st Liévin

1st Overall Superprestige

1st Hamme
1st Gavere
1st Vorselaar

1st Overall Gazet van Antwerpen

1st Oudenaarde
1st Niel
1st Loenhout
1st Lille

1st Aalter
1st Antwerpen
1st Eeklo
1st Harderwijk
1st Hasselt
1st Heerlen
1st Koksijde
1st Lebbeke
1st Sint-Niklaas
2006–2007 (28)
1st Overall UCI World Cup

1st Aigle
1st Kalmthout
1st Pijnacker
1st Koksijde
1st Igorre
1st Nommay
1st Hoogerheide

1st Overall Superprestige

1st Ruddervoorde
1st Sint-Michielsgestel
1st Gavere
1st Gieten
1st Hamme
1st Diegem
1st Hoogstraten
1st Vorselaar

1st Overall Gazet van Antwerpen

1st Oudenaarde
1st Essen
1st Baal
1st Lille

1st Dottignies
1st Eeklo
1st Erpe-Mere
1st Mechelen
1st Overijse
1st Sint-Niklaas
1st Vossem
1st Wachtebeke
1st Zonhoven
2007–2008 (21)
1st National Championships
UCI World Cup

1st Tábor
1st Koksijde
1st Igorre
1st Hofstade

1st Overall Superprestige

1st Ruddervoorde
1st Hamme
1st Gavere
1st Veghel-Eerde
1st Diegem

1st Overall Gazet van Antwerpen

1st Oudenaarde
1st Hasselt
1st Essen
1st Baal

1st Neerpelt
1st Harderwijk
1st Dottignies
1st Asteasu-Guipúzcoa
1st Middelkerke
1st Otegem
1st Surhuisterveen
2008–2009 (18)
1st National Championships
1st Overall UCI World Cup

1st Kalmthout
1st Igorre
1st Milan

1st Overall Superprestige

1st Ruddervoorde
1st Gavere
1st Hamme

1st Overall Gazet van Antwerpen

1st Oudenaarde
1st Essen

1st Neerpelt
1st Dottenijs
1st Eernegem
1st Middelkerke
1st Maldegem
2009–2010 (15)
1st National Championships
UCI World Cup

1st Kalmthout

Superprestige

1st Ruddervoorde
1st Gieten
1st Zonhoven

1st Overall Gazet van Antwerpen

1st Oudenaarde
1st Loenhout
1st Baal
1st Lille

Fidea Classics

1st Niel

1st Woerden
1st Middelkerke
1st Zonnebeke
1st Lebbeke
1st Antwerpen
2010–2011 (14)
1st Overall Superprestige

1st Gavere
1st Hamme
1st Hoogstraten

Gazet van Antwerpen

1st Oudenaarde
1st Essen
1st Baal

Fidea Classics

1st Niel
1st Neerpelt

1st Overijse
1st Erpe-Mere
1st Ronse
1st Maldegem
1st Asteasu
1st Lebbeke
2011–2012 (17)
1st National Championships
UCI World Cup

1st Plzeň
1st Koksijde
1st Namur

1st Overall Superprestige

1st Gieten

Gazet van Antwerpen

1st Baal

Fidea Classics

1st Neerpelt
1st Niel
1st Antwerpen
1st Leuven

1st Laarne
1st Cauberg
1st Eeklo
1st Overijse
2012–2013 (19)
1st UCI World Championships
UCI World Cup

1st Koksijde
1st Roubaix
1st Heusden-Zolder

1st Overall Superprestige

1st Ruddervoorde
1st Zonhoven
1st Hamme
1st Gavere
1st Hoogstraten

Bpost Bank Trophy

1st Oudenaarde
1st Hasselt

Soudal Classics

1st Neerpelt

1st Kalmthout
1st Overijse
1st Sint-Niklaas
1st Bredene
1st Eeklo
1st Lebbeke
1st Mechelen
2013–2014 (17)
1st National Championships
1st Overall Superprestige

1st Zonhoven
1st Gavere
1st Diegem
1st Hoogstraten

1st Overall Bpost Bank Trophy

1st Ronse
1st Hasselt
1st Loenhout
1st Baal
1st Lille

Soudal Classics

1st Leuven
1st Niel

1st Overijse
1st Las Vegas
1st Zonnebeke
1st Lebbeke
1st Mechelen
2014–2015 (4)
Bpost Bank Trophy

1st Ronse

Soudal Classics

1st Neerpelt
1st Niel

1st Las Vegas
2015–2016 (3)
UCI World Cup

1st Koksijde

Soudal Classics

1st Hasselt
1st Mechelen

==== Major championship results ====
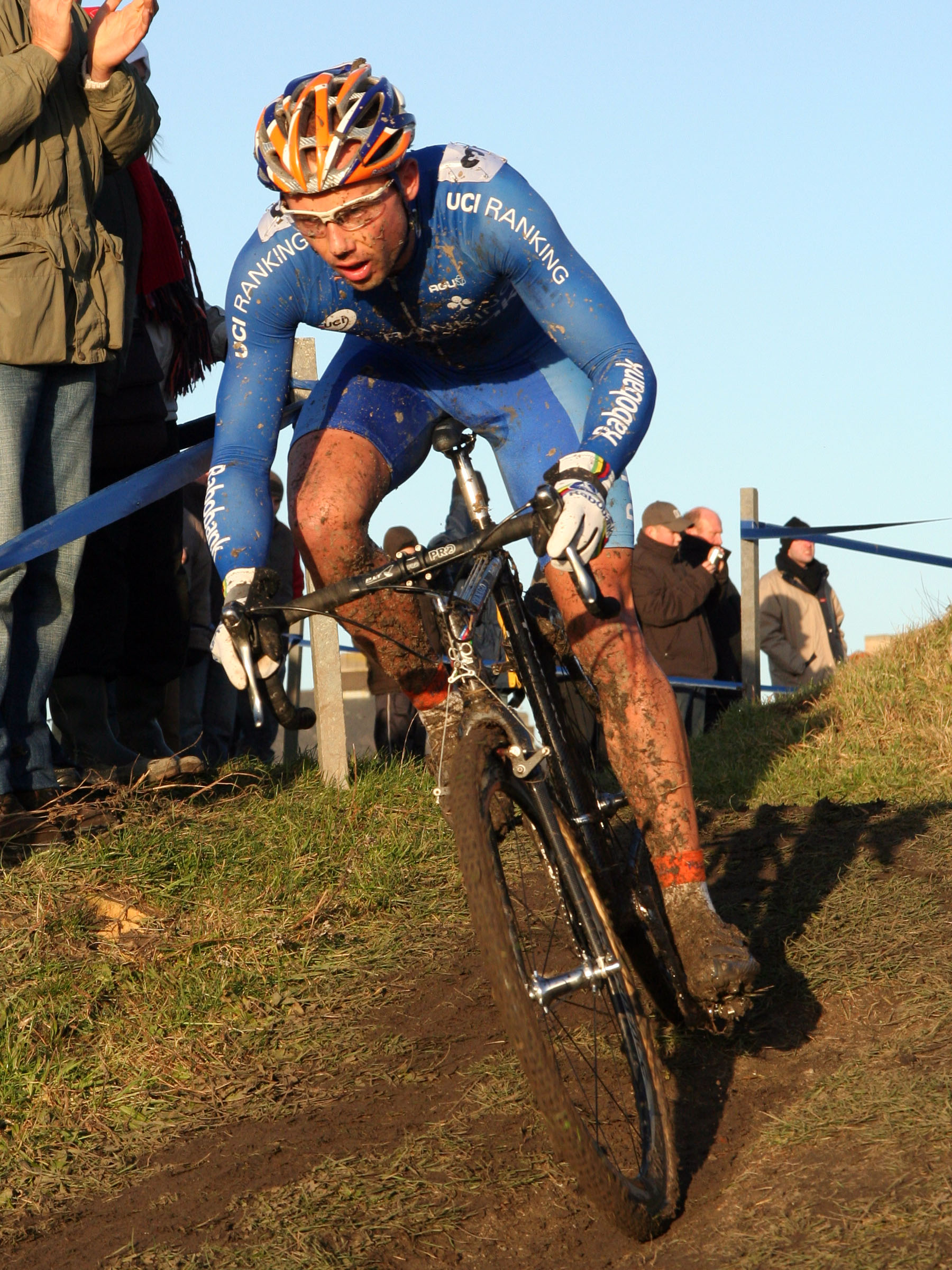
Nys at the 2007 Noordzeecross.

Season	World	National
1998–1999	POP; 6	SOU; 3
1999–2000	SMI; 3	GEN; 1
2000–2001	TAB; 4	MOL; 6
2001–2002	ZOL; 3	KOK; 7
2002–2003	MON; 5	WIE; 1
2003–2004	PCH; DNF	LIL; 3
2004–2005	SAN; 1	WAC; 1
2005–2006	ZED; DNF	TER; 1
2006–2007	HOO; 11	HAM; 3
2007–2008	TRE; 3	HOF; 1
2008–2009	HOO; 3	RUD; 1
2009–2010	TAB; 3	OOS; 1
2010–2011	SAN; 2	ANT; DNF
2011–2012	KOK; 7	HOO; 1
2012–2013	LOU; 1	MOL; 2
2013–2014	HOO; 2	WAR; 1

==== UCI World Cup results ====
Season	1	2	3	4	5	6	7	8	9	10	11	Rank	Points
1998–1999	ESC; 2	TAB; 1	LEU; 4	KOK; 5	ZED; 9	NOM; 5						3	177
1999–2000	SAF; 1	TAB; 2	LEU; 1	KAL; 2	ZED; 2	NOM; 6						1	300
2000–2001	BER —	TAB; 5	LEU; 20	ZOL; 1	ZED; 1	PON; 18						6	179
2001–2002	MON; 1	IGO; 1	WOR; 2	NOM; 10	WET; 1	HEE; 6						1	282
2002–2003	FRA; 3	KAL; 5	LIÉ; 1	WET; 4	HOO; 1							2	300
2003–2004	TOR; 1	SWE; 1	WET; 1	KOK; 5	NOM; 7	PIJ; 7						2	299
2004–2005	WOR; 5	TAB; 5	PIJ; 1	KOK; 2	WET; 1	MIL; 1	HOF; 1	AIG; 2	NOM; 1	HOO; 1	LAN; 1	1	2940
2005–2006	KAL; 1	TAB; 1	PIJ; 1	WET; 1	MIL; 1	IGO; 8	HOF; 1	HGI; 1	LIE; 1	HOO; 8		1	2660
2006–2007	AIG; 1	KAL; 1	TAB; 5	TRE; 2	PIJ; 1	KOK; 1	IGO; 1	MIL; 2	HOF; 5	NOM; 1	HOO; 1	1	3500
2007–2008	KAL; 2	TAB; 1	PIJ; 5	KOK; 1	IGO; 1	MIL; NH	HOF; 1	LIÉ; 8	HOO; 12			NR	NR
2008–2009	KAL; 1	TAB; 4	PIJ; 3	KOK; 2	IGO; 1	NOM; 2	ZOL; 6	ROU; 3	MIL; 1			1	620
2009–2010	TRE; DNF	PLZ; 2	NOM; 3	KOK; 2	IGO; 3	KAL; 1	ZOL; 3	ROU; 3	HOO; 5			3	535
2010–2011	AIG; 9	PLZ; 5	KOK; 3	IGO; 3	KAL; 2	ZOL; 5	PON; 3	HOO; 3				3	484
2011–2012	PLZ; 1	TAB; 5	KOK; 1	IGO; 2	NAM; 1	ZOL; 3	LIÉ; 4	HOO; 6				2	540
2012–2013	TAB; 5	PLZ; 6	KOK; 1	ROU; 1	NAM; 2	ZOL; 1	ROM; 20	HOO; 4				3	506
2013–2014	VAL; DNF	TAB; 24	KOK; 4	NAM; 4	ZOL; 6	ROM; 3	NOM —					12	264
2014–2015	VAL; DNF	KOK; 15	MIL; 8	NAM —	ZOL —	HOO; 6						28	132
2015–2016	LAS; 2	VAL; 3	KOK; 1	NAM; 8	ZOL; 10	LIG; 7	HOO; 13					4	389

==== Superprestige ====
Season	1	2	3	4	5	6	7	8	Rank	Points
1995–1996									26th	7
1996–1997									11th	43
1997–1998									5th	87
1998–1999									1st	154
1999–2000									1st	284
2000–2001	RUD —	GAV; 10	SMI; 2	GIE —	HOO; 3	OVE; 3	DIE; 1	HAR; 3	6th	129
2001–2002	RUD; 2	SMI; 2	GAV; 1	GIE; 1	HOO; 3	DIE; 6	HAR; 15	VOR; 2	1st	177
2002–2003	RUD; 1	SMI; 1	GAV; 4	GIE; 1	DIE; 2	HOO; 1	HAR; 1	VOR; 2	1st	218
2003–2004	RUD; 2	SMI; 1	GAV; 3	GIE; 3	DIE; 4	HOO; 4	RAI; 8	VOR; 1	2nd	176
2004–2005	RUD; 1	HAM; 3	SMI; 2	GAV; 1	GIE; 1	DIE; 2	VOR; 1	HOO; 6	1st	111
2005–2006	RUD; 2	SMI; 2	HAM; 1	GAV; 1	GIE; 2	DIE; 2	HOO; 1	VOR; 1	1st	116
2006–2007	RUD; 1	SMI; 1	GAV; 1	GIE; 1	HAM; 1	DIE; 1	HOO; 1	VOR; 1	1st	150
2007–2008	RUD; 1	HAM; 1	GAV; 1	GIE; 2	VEG; 1	DIE; 1	HOO; 5	VOR; 7	1st	89
2008–2009	RUD; 1	VEG; 3	GAV; 1	HAM; 1	GIE; 3	DIE; 3	HOO; 1	VOR; 1	1st	114
2009–2010	RUD; 1	HOO; 3	GAV; 2	HAM; 2	GIE; 1	DIE; DNF	ZON; 1	VOR; 4	3rd	98
2010–2011	RUD; 3	ZON; 3	HAM; 1	GAV; 1	GIE; 4	DIE; 2	HOO; 1	MID; 6	1st	107
2011–2012	RUD; 4	ZON; 2	HAM; 3	GAV; 5	GIE; 1	DIE; 3	HOO; 3	MID; 2	1st	105
2012–2013	RUD; 1	ZON; 1	HAM; 1	GAV; 1	GIE; 2	DIE; 7	HOO; 1	MID; 5	1st	109
2013–2014	RUD; 2	ZON; 1	HAM; 2	GAV; 1		DIE; 1	HOO; 1	MID; 3	1st	101
2014–2015	GIE; 3	ZON; 2	RUD; 4	GAV; 3	SPA; 8	DIE; 16	HOO; 6	MID; 7	6th	79

==== BPost Bank Trophy ====
Up until the season 2011–2012, this competition was called the Gazet van Antwerpen Trophy (GvA).

Season	1	2	3	4	5	6	7	8	Rank	Points
2007–2008	OUD; 1	NIE; 3	HAS; 1	ESS; 1	LOE; 4	BAA; 1	LIL; 3	OOS	1st	241
2008–2009	OUD; 1	NIE; 3	HAS; 5	ESS; 1	LOE; 2	BAA; 1	LIL; 2	OOS; 1	1st	276
2009–2010	NAM; 2	OUD; 1	HAS; 6	ESS; 2	LOE; 1	BAA; 1	LIL; 1	OOS; 6	1st	188

=== Mountain bike ===
2004–2005
1st National Championships
2006–2007
1st National Championships
1st Apeldoorn
1st Gieten
2008–2009
1st Averbode
2009–2010
1st Gooik
1st Sankt Vith
1st Geraardsbergen
1st Averbode
1st Belgian Cup
2010–2011
1st Boom
1st Geraardsbergen
1st Belgian Cup
2011–2012
1st Antwerp
1st Sankt Vith
1st Geraardsbergen
1st Belgian Cup
2012–2013
1st National Championships
2013–2014
1st National Championships
2014–2015
1st National Championships

=== Road ===
2006
8th Overall Tour of Belgium
2007
1st Internationale Wielertrofee Jong Maar Moedig
2008
10th Omloop der Kempen
2011
9th Internationale Wielertrofee Jong Maar Moedig
2012
5th Circuit de Wallonie
2014
6th Internationale Wielertrofee Jong Maar Moedig

== Personal life ==
Thibau Nys is the son of Sven Nys.

Sporting positions
Preceded by Roel Paulissen	Belgian Mountainbike Champion; 2005	Succeeded by Filip Meirhaeghe
Preceded by Filip Meirhaeghe	Belgian Mountainbike Champion; 2007	Succeeded by Roel Paulissen
Preceded by Kevin Pauwels	Belgian Mountainbike Champion; 2013, 2014, 2015	Succeeded by Ruben Scheire
Awards
Preceded by Tom Boonen	Belgian Sports Personality of the Year; 2006	Succeeded by Justine Henin
