= Thijs Al =

Dutch cyclist (born 1980)

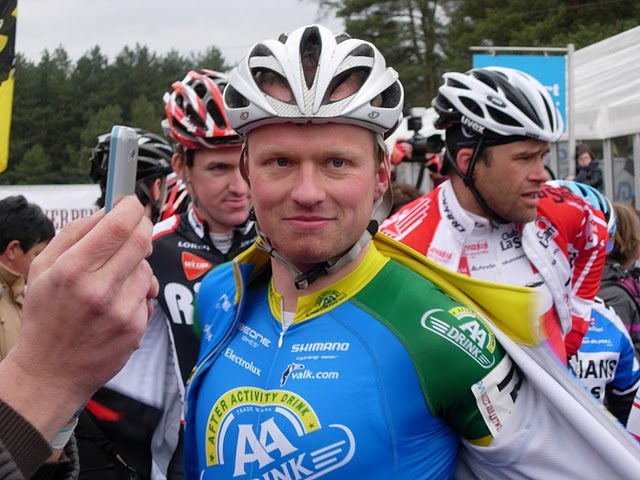

Personal information
- Full name: Thijs Joris Al
- Born: 16 June 1980 (age 46) Zaandam, Netherlands
- Height: 1.80 m (5 ft 11 in)
- Weight: 70–73 kg (154–161 lb)

Cycling career
- Sport: Cycling
- Disciplines: Mountain bike Cyclo-cross; Road race
- Role: Rider

Thijs Joris Al (born 16 June 1980 in Zaandam) is a Dutch cyclist specializing in competitive mountain biking and cyclo-cross. Al rode his first mountain bike race in 1995.

== Career ==
In his junior years Al proved to be a talented rider and was already selected for the junior European and World Championships in 1997 after his 4th position at the Dutch national Championships. At the European Championships in Denmark he did not come further than the 91st position, but at the World Championships in Switzerland his 36th position was a better result. That year he finished in a first position in the Rabobank Topcompetitie and in second place for the Benelux Cup.

He won his first Dutch national title in 1998 and successfully defended his Rabobank Topcompetitie title. At the European Championships in Belgium he finished in 42nd position, but again he performed much better at the World Championships, towards a 17th position in Canada. After a successful year in 1998 he was invited to ride for the Be-One Europe team, which was the junior team for the Be-One World team.

In 1999, his first professional year he had a tough time keeping up with his opponents, mainly due to the longer distances of the races. In the Rabobank Topcompetitie he only finished in third position, while at the Dutch national Championships he had to be satisfied with a 4th place. At the European (28th) and World Championships (47th) he ended up among the anonymous riders.

2000 however brought him better results, he won a mountain bike race in Lemelerveld and a road race in Beverwijk. He became Dutch national mountain bike champion under-23 and he came home with a third place and bronze medal at the European under-23 Championships in Rhenen as a highlight. At the World Championships he finished in 44th position this time.

In 2001 Al showed a lot of progression. He won three races in the challenge for the Belgian Cup and finished second in another race for this cup. He won more mountain bike races in Den Helder, Bergschenhoek and Roc d'Azur, while he won road races in Zwanenburg, Roden and Venhuizen. He finished second in the Norg Topcompetitie, first in the Topcompetitie Espoirs and second in the Topcompetitie Experts. After finishing in second position at the Dutch mountain bike championships he promoted his bronze European Championships medal into a silver one. He also finished 2nd at the Dutch national road championships, surprising all his regular road racing opponents. As a result, he was selected to participate at the road race World Under-23 Championships where he finished 42nd.

The Be-One team retired in 2002 and Al moved to the BankGiroLoterij team. This team mainly focused on road races and Al gained quite some experiences. In the Three-days of Norg he won the second stage, while he finished second in the prologue and the first stage and third in the third stage, resulting in a third place overall. He also won the Kuinre Topcompetitie, but Al's heart for tracks with mud and the friendly atmosphere in mountain bike competitions made him not renew his contract at the end of the year. Back on the mountain bike he became Dutch national champion again and he won the Topcompetitie Espoirs, while finishing second for the Topcompetitie Experts.

Together with his sponsor he created a team that was only focused on qualifying for the 2004 Summer Olympics. 2003 was also his first season as a full professional rider. However he participated as an under-23 rider in Paris–Roubaix and won the race that ended in the velodrome. Al won a road race in Groot-Ammers and won mountain bike races in Berlicum, Oss and Brakel where he outsprinted Filip Meirhage. In the Dutch Championships for elite riders he finished second

In 2004 he started with a win in the beach race of Egmond aan Zee, another race in Nieuwkuijk and one in Apeldoorn. He also won the OZ Wielerweekend, finished in 15th position at the European Championships in Poland. Afterwards he became fifth at the Dutch national championships, but third at the Benelux Championships. Al qualified and represented the Netherlands at the 2004 Summer Olympics in Athens where he finished in 25th position while his teammate Bart Brentjes won the bronze medal.

Al rode in the Giant Mountainbike Racing Team alongside Brentjens in 2005, a great opportunity to learn, but due to the many races in Germany and the travels to and from there his performances dropped down. From 2006 on he became one of the main riders in the Bejan-Rings Pro Cycling Team and he was allowed to schedule his own training program. This was also the period that he got more interested in cyclo-cross. He still became third at the Dutch national mountain bike championships, but afterwards his main results were from the cyclo-cross, among those his second position in Veghel-Eerde and his third position in Hofstade. In 2007 he managed to ride himself into the top three in Huijbergen and Zeddam, while in 2008 he became third in the Centrumcross in Surhuisterveen and second at the Dutch national cyclo-cross championships in Sint-Michielsgestel.

== Career highlights ==
European Championships
2000 – 3rd, mountain bike (under-23)
2001 – 2nd, mountain bike (under-23)

Dutch National Championships
1998 – 1st, mountain bike (juniors)
2000 – 1st, mountain bike (under-23)
2001 – 2nd, mountain bike (under-23)
2001 – 2nd, road race (under-23)
2002 – 1st, mountain bike (under-23)
2003 – Zoetermeer, 2nd, mountain bike
2006 – Noorbeek, 3rd, mountain bike
2008 – Sint-Michielsgestel, 2nd, cyclo-cross
2008 – 1st, mountain bike (elite)

Other achievements
1997 - Netherlands, 1st, Rabobank Topcompetitie
1997 - Benelux, 2nd, Benelux Cup
1998 - Netherlands, 1st, Rabobank Topcompetitie
1999 - Netherlands, 3rd, Rabobank Topcompetitie
2001 - Norg, 2nd, Norg Topcompetitie
2001 - Netherlands, 1st, Topcompetitie Espoirs
2001 - Netherlands, 2nd, Topcompetitie Experts
2002 - Norg, 1st, Second Stage, Norg 3 daagse
2002 - Norg, 3rd, Norg Topcompetitie
2002 - Kuinre, 1st, Kuinre Topcompetitie
2002 - Netherlands, 1st, Topcompetitie Espoirs
2002 - Netherlands, 2nd, Topcompetitie Experts
2003 - Egmond-pier-Egmond, 3rd, Egmond Strandrace
2003 - Voroklini, 2nd, Voroklini Cyprus
2003 - Berlicum, 1st, mountain bike
2003 - Cassis, 3rd, mountain bike
2003 - Paris–Roubaix, 1st, under-23
2003 - Havelte, 2nd, mountain bike
2003 - Haren, 2nd, road race
2003 - Oss, 1st, mountain bike
2003 - Wageningen, 3rd, road race
2003 - Groot-Ammers, 1st, road race
2003 - Brakel, 1st, Beker van België, mountain bike
2003 - Winterslag, 2nd, Beker van België, mountain bike
2003 - Gieten, 2nd, mountain bike
2004 - Egmond-pier-Egmond, 1st, mountain bike, beach race
2004 - Berlicum, 2nd, mountain bike
2004 - Thieusies, 2nd, mountain bike
2004 - Nieuwkuijk, 1st, mountain bike
2004 - Apeldoorn, 1st, mountain bike
2004 - Machairas, 3rd, Afxenteia MTB Stage
2004 - Netherlands, 1st in General Classification, OZ Wielerweekend, road race
2004 - Benelux, 3rd, mountain bike, Benelux Championship
2004 - Gieten, 2nd, mountain bike
2005 - Marle, 3rd, cyclo-cross
2006 - Veghel-Eerde, 2nd, cyclo-cross
2006 - Hofstade, 3rd, cyclo-cross
2007 - Huijbergen, 3rd, cyclo-cross
2007 - Zeddam, 3rd, cyclo-cross
2008 - Surhuisterveen, 3rd, Surhuisterveen Centrumcross, cyclo-cross

== See also ==
- List of Dutch Olympic cyclists
