= Bart Aernouts =

Belgian cyclist

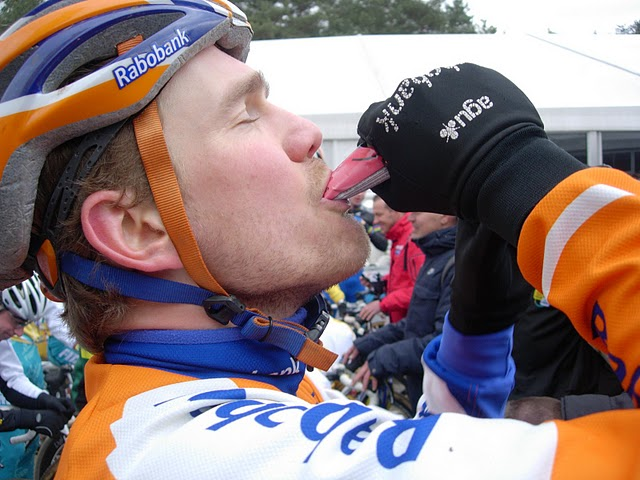
- Aernouts in 2010

Personal information
- Full name: Bart Aernouts
- Born: 23 June 1982 (age 44) Essen, Belgium
- Height: 1.72 m (5 ft 8 in)
- Weight: 60 kg (132 lb; 9 st 6 lb)

Cycling career
- Sport: Cycling
- Current team: Retired
- Disciplines: Cyclo-cross; Mountain bike racing
- Role: Rider

Amateur teams
- 2007–2012: Rabobank–Giant Off-Road
- 2012–2014: AA Drink

Professional teams
- 2002–2010: Rabobank GS3
- 2014–2015: Corendon–Kwadro

Major wins
- Junior CX Worlds (2000)
Medal record
Representing Belgium
Men's cyclo-cross
World Championships
Gold medal – first place	Sint-Michielsgestel 2000	Junior Men's Race

Bart Aernouts (born 23 June 1982 in Essen) is a Belgian former professional cyclist who competed mainly in cyclo-cross races. Aernouts often finished only a few places behind big names such as Sven Nys, Niels Albert and Zdeněk Štybar, but occasionally managed top results in high calibre races of the Gazet van Antwerpen Trophy or the Superprestige.

He achieved his major wins in Sint-Michielsgestel, where he won both the Junior UCI Cyclo-cross World Championships in 2000 and the Cyclo-cross Sint-Michielsgestel in 2010.

Aernouts announced his retirement from professional cyclocross in February 2015 after illness curtailed his 2014–15 season.
