= Sven Vanthourenhout =

Belgian cyclist

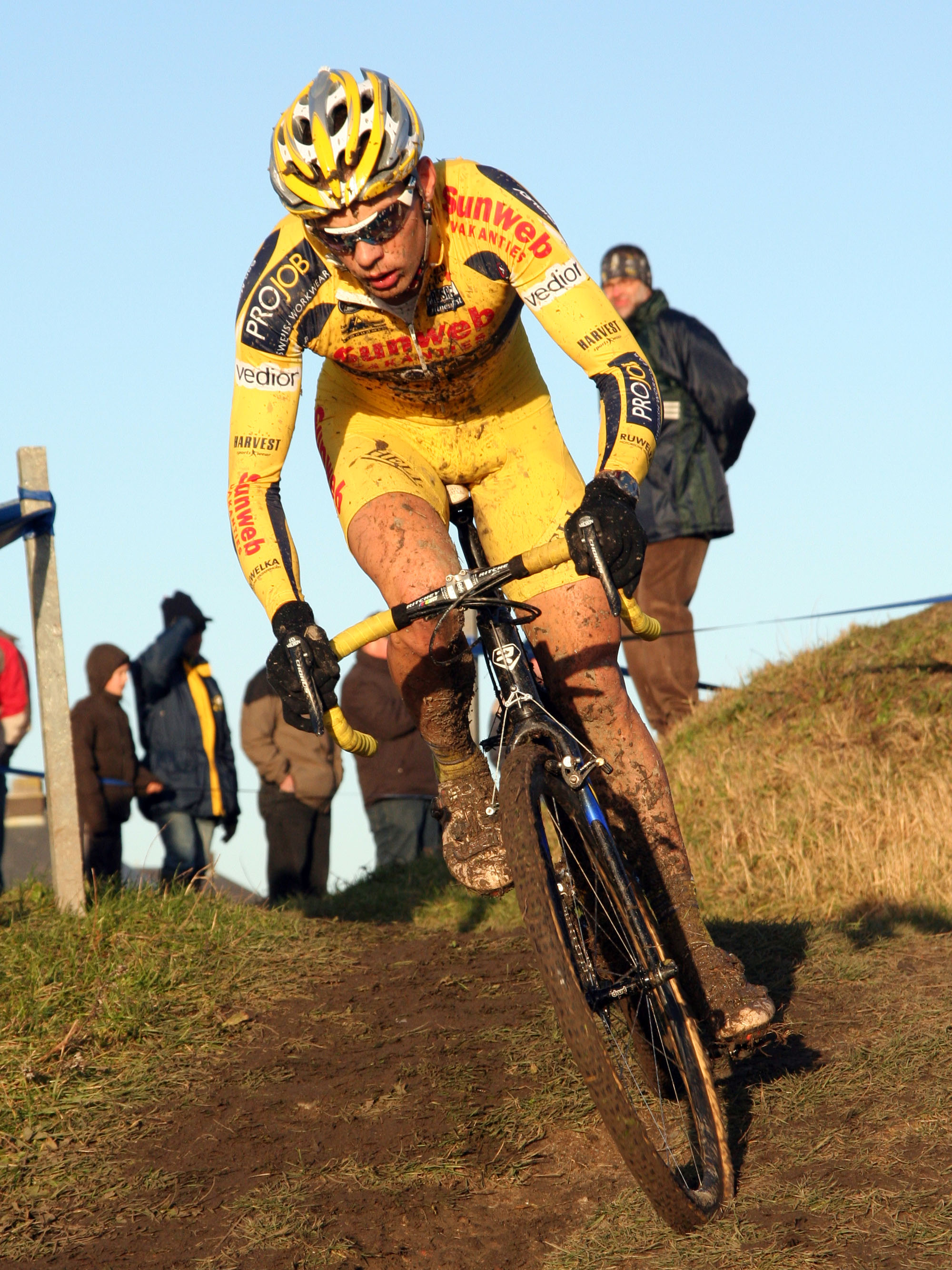
- Vanthourenhout at the 2007 Noordzeecross.

Personal information
- Full name: Sven Vanthourenhout
- Born: 14 January 1981 (age 45) Bruges, Belgium

Cycling career
- Sport: Cycling
- Current team: Belgian cycling team
- Disciplines: Cyclo-cross; Road
- Role: Rider (retired); Team manager

Professional teams
- 2001–2002: Domo-Farm Frites
- 2003–2004: Quick-Step–Davitamon
- 2005–2006: Rabobank Continental Team
- 2007–2011: Sunweb-ProJob
- 2011–2013: Landbouwkrediet
- 2014–2016: Crelan-AA Drink
Medal record
Representing Belgium
Men's cyclo-cross
World Championships
| Bronze medal – third place | 2004 Pontchâteau | Elite Men's Race |
| Bronze medal – third place | 2005 Sankt Wendel | Elite Men's Race |

Sven Vanthourenhout (born 14 January 1981 in Bruges) is a Belgian cycling coach and former professional racing cyclist, primarily riding cyclo-cross. Since 2017, Vanthourenhout has been the coach of the Belgian national cyclo-cross team, and in 2020 became the coach of the national road cycling team as well.

== Career highlights ==
1997
3rd in National Championship, Road, Novices, Belgium (BEL)
1st in National Championship, Cyclo-cross, Debutants, Belgium, Mol (BEL)
1st in Praha, Cyclo-cross, Juniors (CZE)
1998
2nd in Ledegem – Kemmel – Ledegem, Juniors (BEL)
1st in National Championship, Cyclo-cross, Juniors, Belgium, Ruddervoorde (BEL)
1999
2nd in World Championship, Cyclo-cross, Juniors, Poprad
1st in National Championship, Cyclo-cross, Juniors, Belgium, Soumagne (BEL)
2nd in Eernegem Cyclocross (BEL)
2000
3rd in National Championship, Cyclo-cross, U23, Belgium, Gent(Blaarmeersen) (BEL)
3rd in Langemark, Cyclo-cross (BEL)
1st in Oostende, Cyclo-cross (BEL)
1st in Bredene, Cyclo-cross (BEL)
2nd in Dudzele, Cyclo-cross (BEL)
3rd in Eernegem Cyclocross (BEL)
3rd in Oelegem, Cyclo-cross (BEL)
2001
1st in World Championship, Cyclo-cross, U23
1st in National Championship, Cyclo-cross, U23, Belgium, Mol (BEL)
1st in Langemark, Cyclo-cross (BEL)
3rd in Oostmalle, Cyclo-cross (BEL)
1st in Oostende, Cyclo-cross (BEL)
3rd in Ardooie, Cyclo-cross (BEL)
1st in Middelkerke, Cyclo-cross (BEL)
2nd in Bredene, Cyclo-cross (BEL)
2nd in La Cerisaie-Ballan, Cyclo-cross (FRA)
3rd in Zonnebeke, Cyclo-cross (BEL)
3rd in Wielsbeke, Cyclo-cross (BEL)
1st in Veldegem, Cyclo-cross (BEL)
2002
3rd in Ardooie, Cyclo-cross (BEL)
1st in Eernegem Cyclocross (BEL)
1st in GP Briek Schotte (a) (BEL)
1st in Beuvry, Cyclo-cross (FRA)
3rd in National Championship, Cyclo-cross, Elite, Belgium, Koksijde (BEL)
2nd in Pijnacker-Nootdorp, Cyclo-cross (NED)
3rd in Harnes, Cyclo-cross (FRA)
3rd in Eeklo, Cyclo-cross (BEL)
3rd in Dottignies, Cyclo-cross (BEL)
2nd in Tabor, Cyclo-cross (CZE)
2nd in Veldegem, Cyclo-cross (BEL)
2003
1st in Dudzele, Cyclo-cross (BEL)
1st in Oostende, Cyclo-cross (BEL)
1st in Zonnebeke, Cyclo-cross (BEL)
3rd in National Championship, Road, Elite, Belgium, Vilvoorde (BEL)
3rd in Ruddervoorde, Cyclo-cross (BEL)
3rd in Sint-Michielsgestel, Cyclo-cross (NED)
2nd in Eernegem Cyclocross (BEL)
1st in Veldegem, Cyclo-cross, Veldegem (BEL)
2004
1st in Raismes, Cyclo-cross (FRA)
1st in Otegem, Cyclo-cross (BEL)
3rd in World Championship, Cyclo-cross, Elite, Pont-Château (FRA)
1st in Harnes, Cyclo-cross, Harnes (FRA)
2nd in Eeklo, Cyclo-cross (BEL)
2nd in GP de Eecloonaar, Eeklo (BEL)
3rd in Oostmalle, Cyclo-cross (BEL)
1st in Dudzele, Cyclo-cross (BEL)
3rd in Genk, Cyclo-cross (BEL)
3rd in Aalter, Cyclo-cross (BEL)
2nd in Wortegem-Petegem, Cyclo-cross, Wortegem-Petegem (BEL)
1st in Ardooie, Cyclo-cross (BEL)
1st in Middelkerke, Cyclo-cross (BEL)
1st in Hamme-Zogge, Cyclo-cross (BEL)
2nd in Tabor, Cyclo-cross (CZE)
3rd in Dottignies, Cyclo-cross (BEL)
3rd in Sint-Michielsgestel, Cyclo-cross (NED)
1st in Eernegem Cyclocross (BEL)
3rd in Niel, Cyclo-cross (BEL)
3rd in Pijnacker-Nootdorp, Cyclo-cross (NED)
3rd in Lebbeke, Cyclo-cross (BEL)
3rd in Overijse, Cyclo-cross (BEL)
3rd in Diegem, Cyclo-cross (BEL)
2nd in Loenhout, Cyclo-cross (BEL)
2005
3rd in Baal, Cyclo-cross (BEL)
1st in Aigle, Cyclo-cross (SUI)
1st in Otegem, Cyclo-cross (BEL)
3rd in Nommay, Cyclo-cross (FRA)
1st in Zonnebeke, Cyclo-cross (BEL)
3rd in Hoogerheide, Cyclo-cross (NED)
3rd in World Championship, Cyclo-cross, Elite, Sankt-Wendel
3rd in Lille (-B-), Cyclo-cross (BEL)
2nd in Hoogstraten, Cyclo-cross (BEL)
1st in Eeklo, Cyclo-cross (BEL)
3rd in General Classification Superprestige, Cyclo-cross
2nd in General Classification Gazet van Antwerpen Trofee (BEL)
3rd in Oostmalle, Cyclo-cross (BEL)
2nd in Waregem (BEL)
3rd in Trofee Jong Maar Moedig I.W.T. (BEL)
1st in Dudzele, Cyclo-cross (BEL)
3rd in Erpe-Mere, Cyclo-cross (BEL)
3rd in Dottignies, Cyclo-cross (BEL)
2nd in Ardooie, Cyclo-cross (BEL)
3rd in Lebbeke, Cyclo-cross (BEL)
2nd in Eernegem Cyclocross (BEL)
3rd in Koksijde, Cyclo-cross (BEL)
1st in Wachtebeke, Cyclo-cross (BEL)
1st in Middelkerke, Cyclo-cross (BEL)
2006
1st in Otegem, Cyclo-cross (BEL)
3rd in Antwerpen, Cyclo-cross (BEL)
1st in Zonnebeke, Cyclo-cross (BEL)
3rd in Hoogstraten, Cyclo-cross (BEL)
2nd in Vorselaar, Cyclo-cross (BEL)
1st in Württemberg Strasse (GER)
3rd in General Classification OZ Wielerweekend (NED)
1st in Dudzele, Cyclo-cross, Dudzele (BEL)
2nd in Aalter, Cyclo-cross (BEL)
1st in Eernegem Cyclocross (BEL)
3rd in Zonhoven, Cyclo-cross (BEL)
2nd in Ruddervoorde, Cyclo-cross (BEL)
2nd in Lebbeke, Cyclo-cross (BEL)
1st in Knokke-Heist, Cyclo-cross (BEL)
3rd in Koksijde, Cyclo-cross (BEL)
3rd in Milano, Cyclo-cross (ITA)
2nd in Overijse, Cyclo-cross (BEL)
3rd in Wachtebeke, Cyclo-cross (BEL)
1st in Torhout-Wijnendale, Cyclo-cross (BEL)
2007
2nd in Otegem, Cyclo-cross (BEL)
3rd in Indoorcross Mechelen, Cyclo-cross (BEL)
1st in Zonnebeke, Cyclo-cross (BEL)
2nd in Ardooie, Cyclo-cross (BEL)
2nd in Eernegem Cyclocross (BEL)
2nd in Asteasu, Cyclo-cross (ESP)
2008
2nd in Zonnebeke, Cyclo-cross (BEL)
