= Denise Betsema =

Dutch cyclist (born 1993)

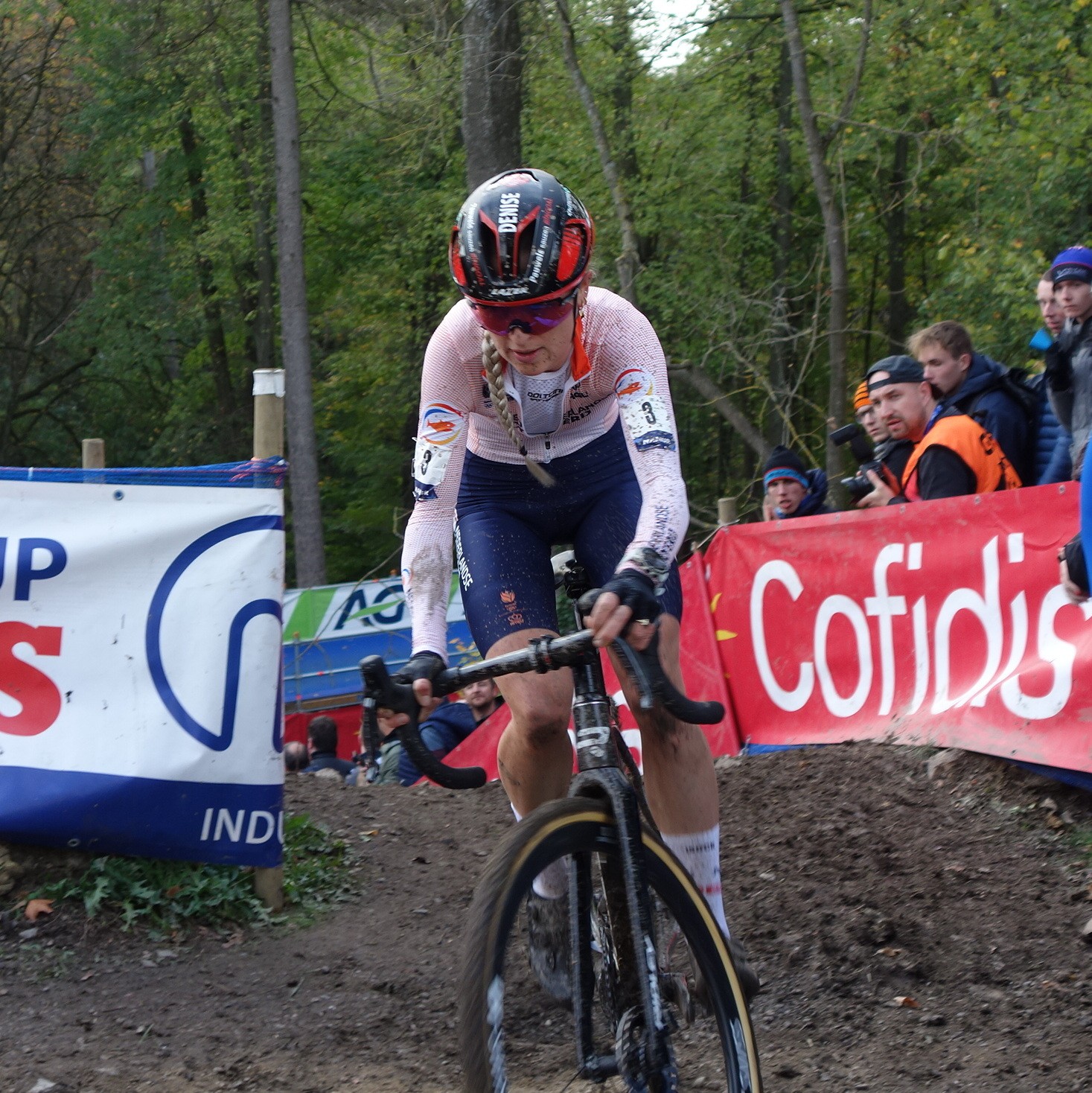
- Betsema, Namur, 2022.

Personal information
- Full name: Denise Betsema
- Born: 23 January 1993 (age 33) Oudeschild, Netherlands
- Height: 1.66 m (5 ft 5 in)
- Weight: 54 kg (119 lb)

Cycling career
- Sport: Cycling
- Current team: Pauwels Sauzen–Altez Industriebouw Cycling Team
- Disciplines: Cyclo-cross; Mountain biking
- Role: Rider

Professional teams
- 2011: Giant Dealerteams
- 2018–: Marlux–Bingoal

Major wins
- Cyclo-cross World Cup 3 individual wins (2018–19, 2020–21, 2021–22)
Medal record
Representing Netherlands
Women's Cyclo-cross
World Championships
Bronze medal – third place	Oostende 2021	Elite
European Championships
Bronze medal – third place	Rosmalen 2018	Elite

Denise Betsema (born 23 January 1993) is a Dutch cyclo-cross cyclist, who currently rides for UCI Cyclo-cross team De Ceuster-Bouwpunt.

== Career ==
In October 2018 Betsema joined the professional cyclo-cross team Marlux–Bingoal. In the season 2018–2019 she won the crosses at Poprad, Neerpelt, Aigle, Hittnau, Lutterbach, Wachtebeke, Koksijde, Eschenbach, Antwerpen, Otegem, Maldegem, Middelkerke, Hulst, Leuven and Oostmalle. She also won the bronze medal at the European championships.

=== Positive drug test ===
On 5 April 2019, it was announced that she had tested positive for the use of steroids in a drug test on 27 January 2019 during the World Cup in Hoogerheide. Betsema denies the facts but she was temporarily suspended by her team awaiting the outcome of the counter-expertise. On 16 May, it was announced her B sample was also positive for steroids.

On 20 January 2020, the UCI announced that besides in Hoogerheide, she had also failed a doping test in Middelkerke. The UCI proposed the rider a retroactive sanction of six months suspension, starting from 5 April 2019, which was the day her team voluntary put her on non-active status. Betsema also forfeits all results from Hoogerheide on, which meant the loss of her 2019 victories in Maldegem, Middelkerke, Hulst, Leuven, and Oostmalle. Betsema accepted the sanction proposed by the UCI but she and her legal counsels are still of the opinion she was the victim of a tainted food supplement.

== Personal life ==
Betsema has two children and lives in Texel.

== Major results ==
=== Cyclo-cross ===
2018–2019
UCI World Cup

1st Koksijde
2nd Pont-Château

DVV Trophy

1st Antwerpen
3rd Loenhout

1st Overall EKZ CrossTour

1st Aigle
1st Hittnau
1st Eschenbach
3rd Baden
3rd Meilen

1st Otegem
1st Neerpelt
1st Wachtebeke
1st Solidarite
1st Poprad
2nd Hasselt
3rd Overall Superprestige

2nd Zonhoven
3rd Diegem

3rd UEC European Championships
Toi Toi Cup

3rd Unicov

2019–2020
Rectavit Series

1st Leuven
1st Waregem

Superprestige

2nd Middelkerke

2nd Zonnebeke
2nd Oostmalle
Ethias Cross

3rd Maldegem
3rd Hulst

2020–2021
1st Oostmalle
1st Sint-Niklaas
2nd Overall X²O Badkamers Trophy

1st Antwerpen
2nd Kortrijk
2nd Hamme
2nd Brussels
3rd Herentals
3rd Baal
3rd Lille

3rd Overall UCI World Cup

1st Hulst
3rd Tábor
3rd Namur

3rd Overall Superprestige

1st Middelkerke
2nd Gavere
2nd Merksplas
3rd Boom
3rd Niel

Ethias Cross

1st Beringen
1st Eeklo
1st Sint-Niklaas
2nd Leuven
3rd Kruibeke

EKZ CrossTour

1st Bern

3rd UCI World Championships
2021–2022
2nd Overall UCI World Cup

1st Zonhoven
2nd Fayetteville
2nd Iowa City
2nd Koksijde
2nd Namur
3rd Waterloo
3rd Besançon
3rd Rucphen
3rd Dendermonde

2nd Overall Superprestige

1st Ruddervoorde
2nd Gieten
3rd Niel
3rd Merksplas
3rd Boom
3rd Gavere

2nd Overall X²O Badkamers Trophy

1st Brussels
2nd Koppenberg
2nd Loenhout
2nd Herentals
3rd Kortrijk
3rd Baal
3rd Hamme

2nd Oostmalle
Ethias Cross

1st Lokeren
3rd Beringen

2022–2023
3rd Overall Superprestige

1st Ruddervoorde
2nd Niel
2nd Merksplas
2nd Boom
3rd Gullegem

Exact Cross

1st Zonnebeke
3rd Kruibeke
3rd Beringen
3rd Meulebeke

X²O Badkamers Trophy

2nd Koppenberg
3rd Kortrijk

UCI World Cup

3rd Dublin
4th Maasmechelen

3rd Maldegem
3rd Oostmalle
3rd Otegem
2023–2024
X²O Badkamers Trophy

2nd Koppenberg

3rd Oisterwijk
UCI World Cup

4th Flamanville

2024–2025
3rd National Championships
2026–2027
1st Bad Salzdetfurth I
1st Bad Salzdetfurth II
1st Brumath
1st Perl
HG Cross

2nd Heerderstrand
3rd Dendermonde

2nd Mechelen
Superprestige

3rd Middelkerke
3rd Niel

3rd Ardooie
