= Michael Vanthourenhout =

Belgian cyclist (born 1993)

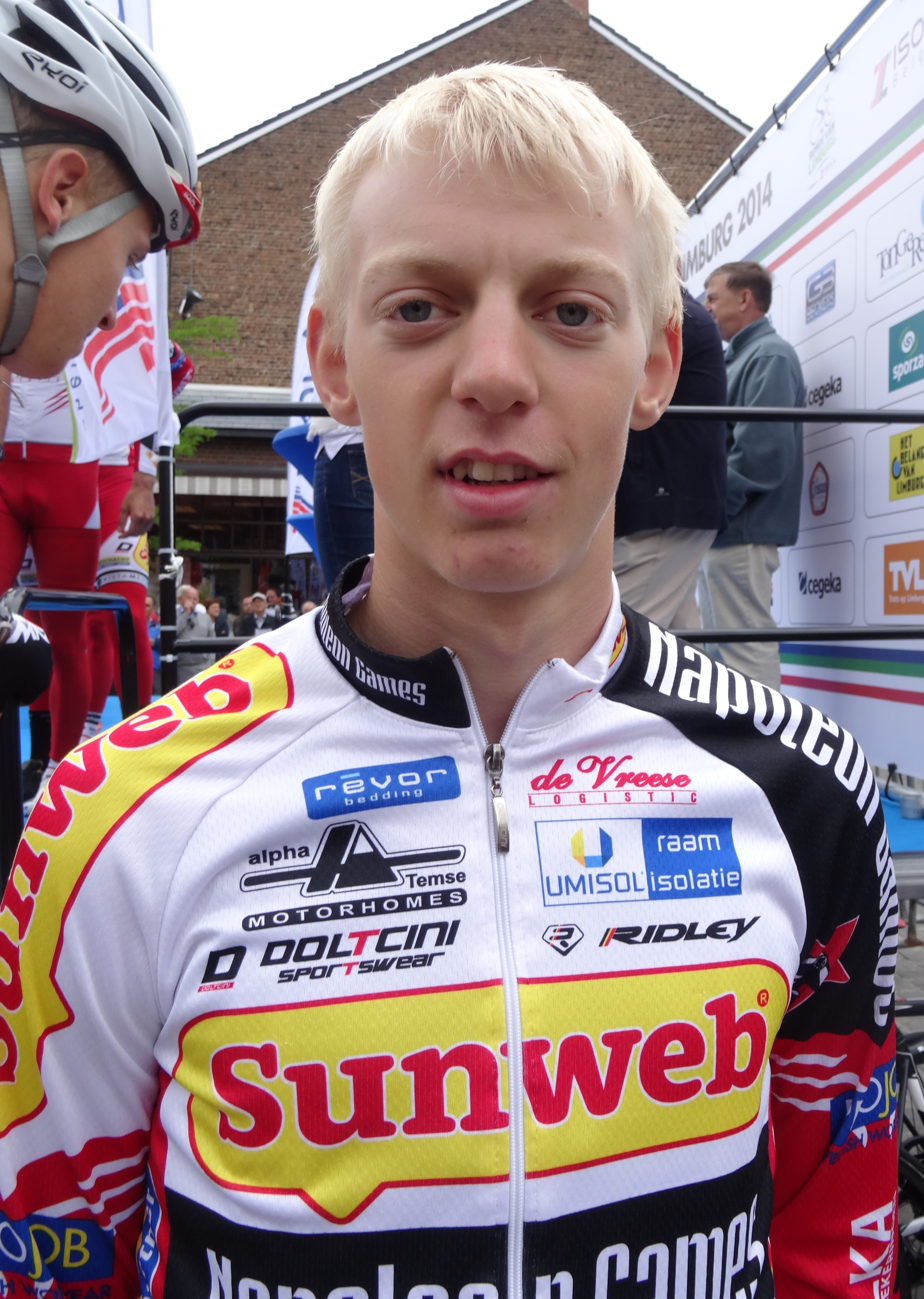
- Vanthourenhout in 2014

Personal information
- Full name: Michael Vanthourenhout
- Born: 10 December 1993 (age 32) Bruges, Belgium
- Height: 1.82 m (6 ft 0 in)
- Weight: 62 kg (137 lb)

Cycling career
- Sport: Cycling
- Current team: Pauwels Sauzen–Altez Industriebouw Cycling Team
- Disciplines: Cyclo-cross; Road
- Role: Rider

Professional teams
- 2012–2013: BKCP–Powerplus
- 2014–: Sunweb–Napoleon Games

Major wins
- Cyclo-cross European Championships (2022, 2023) National Championships (2023) World Cup (2024–25) 7 individual wins (2020–21, 2021–22, 2022–23, 2024–25, 2025–26)
Medal record
Men's cyclo-cross
Representing Belgium
World Championships
Gold medal – first place	2015 Tábor	Under-23
Silver medal – second place	2014 Hoogerheide	Under-23
Silver medal – second place	2018 Valkenburg	Elite
Bronze medal – third place	2024 Tábor	Elite
Bronze medal – third place	2024 Tábor	Team relay
European Championships
Gold medal – first place	2023 Pontchâteau	Elite
Gold medal – first place	2022 Namur	Elite
Silver medal – second place	2020 Rosmalen	Elite
Bronze medal – third place	2021 Wijster	Elite

Michael Vanthourenhout (born 10 December 1993) is a Belgian cyclo-cross and road cyclist, who currently rides for UCI Continental team Pauwels Sauzen–Altez Industriebouw Cycling Team. He represented his nation in the men's elite event at the 2016 UCI Cyclo-cross World Championships in Heusden-Zolder.

He is the brother of racing cyclist Dieter Vanthourenhout. In August 2021 Michael Vanthourenhout married Kelly Van den Steen

== Major results ==
2010–2011
Junior Superprestige

2nd Ruddervoorde

2nd Junior Aigle
Junior Fidea Classics

3rd Tervuren

2011–2012
Under-23 Gazet van Antwerpen

1st Ronse

UCI Under-23 World Cup

3rd Liévin

2012–2013
Under-23 Superprestige

1st Middelkerke

1st Kalmthout
3rd Overall Under-23 Bpost Bank Trophy

1st Ronse
1st Koppenberg
2nd Hasselt

UCI Under-23 World Cup

3rd Plzeň

2013–2014
1st UEC European Under-23 Championships
UCI Under-23 World Cup

1st Cauberg
3rd Nommay

Under-23 Superprestige

2nd Ruddervoorde
2nd Middelkerke
3rd Hoogstraten

2nd UCI World Under-23 Championships
2nd Eeklo
Under-23 Bpost Bank Trophy

3rd Baal

2014–2015
1st UCI World Under-23 Championships
1st Overall UCI Under-23 World Cup

1st Cauberg
2nd Hoogerheide

1st Overall Under-23 Superprestige

1st Diegem
2nd Zonhoven
2nd Ruddervoorde
2nd Gavere
2nd Spa-Francorchamps
2nd Hoogstraten
2nd Middelkerke

1st Ardooie
2nd Overall Under-23 Bpost Bank Trophy

1st Ronse
1st Koppenberg
2nd Hamme
2nd Essen
3rd Hasselt
3rd Baal
3rd Lille

2nd Otegem
3rd Eeklo
2015–2016
1st Maldegem
2nd Erpe-Mere
2nd Versluys
2nd Otegem
2nd Contern
UCI World Cup

3rd Las Vegas

Bpost Bank Trophy

3rd Essen

EKZ CrossTour

3rd Eschenbach

3rd Eeklo
2016–2017
Brico Cross

1st Kruibeke
2nd Maldegem
2nd Geraardsbergen

1st Contern
UCI World Cup

2nd Las Vegas
3rd Hoogerheide

DVV Trophy

3rd Ronse
3rd Baal

Soudal Classics

3rd Neerpelt

3rd Zonnebeke
2017–2018
2nd UCI World Championships
Brico Cross

2nd Meulebeke
3rd Eeklo

UCI World Cup

3rd Hoogerheide

Superprestige

3rd Middelkerke

DVV Trophy

3rd Hamme

Soudal Classics

3rd Leuven
3rd Waregem

2018–2019
UCI World Cup

2nd Tábor
3rd Iowa City
3rd Pontchâteau

3rd Overall DVV Trophy

2nd Koppenberg
2nd Lille
3rd Brussels

Superprestige

2nd Diegem
2nd Middelkerke

Brico Cross

2nd Maldegem
3rd Ronse

2nd Overijse
2nd Wachtebeke
3rd National Championships
2019–2020
Ethias Cross

1st Meulebeke
2nd Maldegem

2nd Gullegem
UCI World Cup

3rd Waterloo
3rd Bern

Superprestige

3rd Diegem

2nd Overall DVV Trophy

3rd Koppenberg

3rd Oostmalle
2020–2021
EKZ CrossTour

1st Bern

2nd UEC European Championships
3rd National Championships
3rd Overall UCI World Cup

1st Tábor

3rd Overall Superprestige

1st Merksplas
2nd Boom
2nd Middelkerke

3rd Overall X²O Badkamers Trophy

2nd Lille
3rd Herentals

Ethias Cross

3rd Bredene
3rd Sint-Niklaas

2021–2022
2nd Overall UCI World Cup

1st Namur
2nd Waterloo
2nd Overijse
2nd Val di Sole
3rd Fayetteville
3rd Iowa City
3rd Rucphen
3rd Flamanville
4th Besançon
4th Dendermonde
4th Hoogerheide
5th Tábor

3rd Overall X²O Badkamers Trophy

1st Brussels
2nd Loenhout

Ethias Cross

1st Meulebeke
1st Sint-Niklaas
3rd Lokeren
3rd Bredene

3rd UEC European Championships
2022–2023
1st UEC European Championships
1st National Championships
2nd Overall UCI World Cup

1st Overijse
1st Val di Sole
3rd Fayetteville
3rd Tábor
3rd Antwerpen
4th Waterloo
4th Maasmechelen
4th Gavere
4th Zonhoven
5th Dublin

Exact Cross

1st Kruibeke
1st Meulebeke
2nd Beringen

1st Maldegem
3rd Overall X²O Badkamers Trophy

2nd Baal
2nd Brussels
3rd Koppenberg
3rd Hamme

3rd Overall Superprestige

3rd Niel
3rd Merksplas
3rd Gullegem

2023–2024
1st UEC European Championships
Exact Cross

1st Zonnebeke
1st Sint-Niklaas
2nd Maldegem
3rd Beringen

1st Gullegem
UCI World Cup

2nd Benidorm
4th Val di Sole
5th Namur

Superprestige

2nd Overijse
3rd Ruddervoorde

3rd Overall X²O Badkamers Trophy

2nd Hamme
2nd Brussels

3rd UCI World Championships
3rd National Championships
2024–2025
1st Overall UCI World Cup

1st Dublin
1st Namur
2nd Gavere
2nd Hoogerheide
5th Dendermonde
5th Benidorm

X²O Badkamers Trophy

1st Herentals
1st Brussels

1st Ardooie
Exact Cross

2nd Beringen
3rd Sint-Niklaas

2nd Woerden
3rd Overall Superprestige

3rd Ruddervoorde
3rd Mol
3rd Gullegem

2025–2026
UCI World Cup

1st Terralba
3rd Namur

X²O Badkamers Trophy

1st Brussels
2nd Lokeren
3rd Lille

Swiss Cup

1st Steinmaur

2nd Overall Superprestige

1st Ruddervoorde
1st Overijse
1st Middelkerke
2nd Gullegem
3rd Niel
3rd Heusden-Zolder

Exact Cross

2nd Sint-Niklaas
3rd Meulebeke

2nd Ardooie
3rd National Championships
2026–2027
Superprestige

1st Overijse

HG Cross

1st Dendermonde
1st Meulebeke

X²O Trophy

2nd Koppenberg
3rd Hamme–Zogge
