= Toon Aerts =

Belgian cyclist (born 1993)

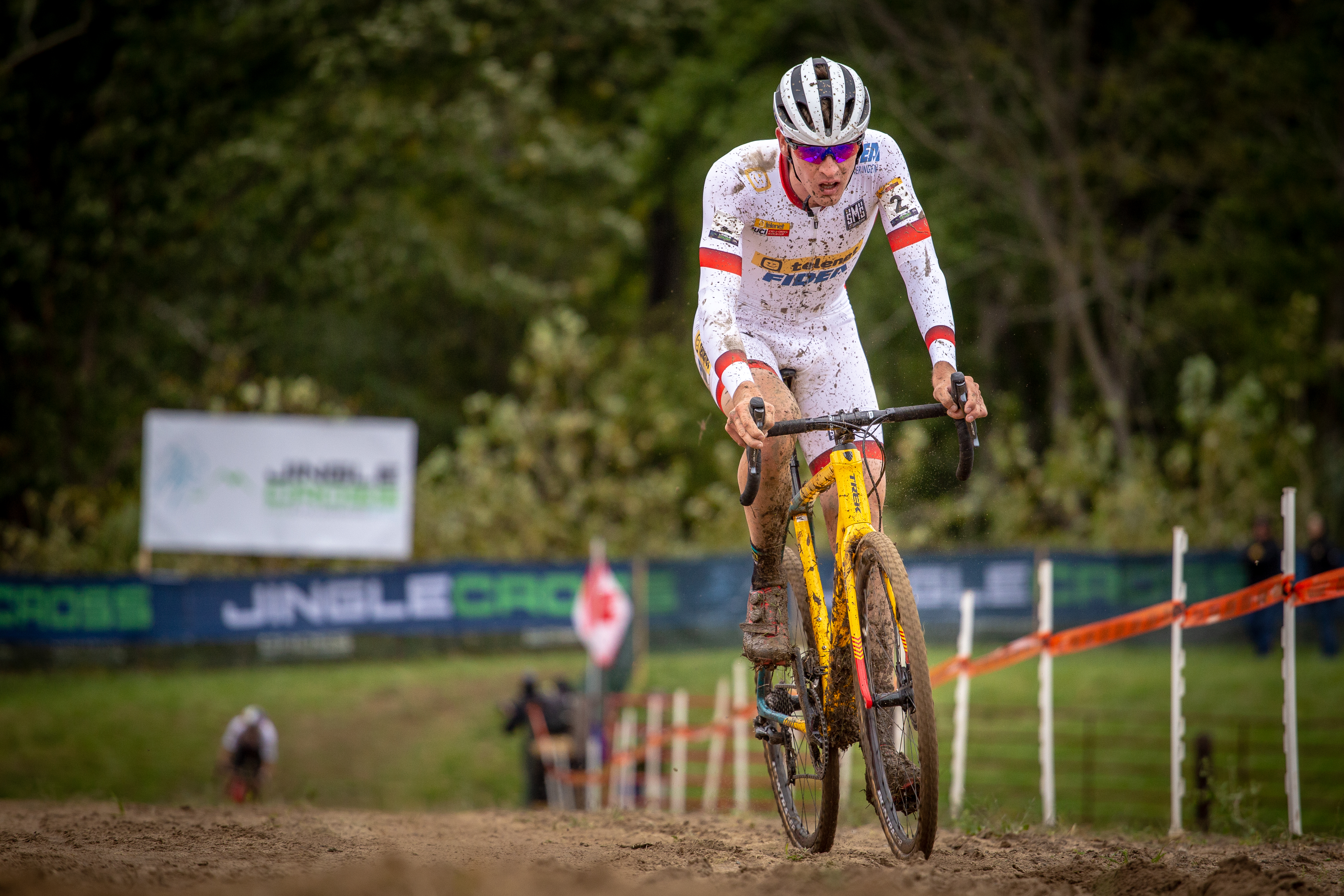
- Aerts in 2018

Personal information
- Full name: Toon Aerts
- Born: 19 October 1993 (age 33) Malle, Belgium
- Height: 1.88 m (6 ft 2 in)
- Weight: 76 kg (168 lb)

Cycling career
- Sport: Cycling
- Current team: Lotto–Intermarché
- Disciplines: Cyclo-cross; Road
- Role: Rider

Professional teams
- 2013–2022: Telenet–Fidea
- 2024–2025: Team Deschacht–Group Hens–Containers Maes
- 2025–: Lotto

Major wins
- Cyclo-cross European Championships (2016, 2025) National Championships (2019) World Cup (2018–19, 2019–20) 3 individual wins (2018–19, 2021–22) Superprestige (2020–21) Trophy (2021–22)
Medal record
Men's cyclo-cross
Representing Belgium
World Championships
Bronze medal – third place	2019 Bogense	Elite
Bronze medal – third place	2020 Dübendorf	Elite
Bronze medal – third place	2021 Oostende	Elite
European Championships
Gold medal – first place	2016 Pontchâteau	Elite
Gold medal – first place	2025 Middelkerke	Elite
Bronze medal – third place	2017 Tabor	Elite

Toon Aerts (born 19 October 1993 in Malle) is a Belgian professional cyclo-cross and road cyclist, who currently rides for UCI WorldTeam Lotto–Intermarché. Aerts is a two-time winner of the UCI Cyclo-cross World Cup standings (2018–19, 2019–20), and also won the men's elite race at the 2016 European Championships and the 2019 Belgian National Championships. His brother Thijs is also a professional cyclist.

On 18 August 2023, the UCI announced that Aerts had been found guilty of a doping violation, and was banned for two years from February 2022 to February 2024. His results between January and February 2023 were also expunged.

== Major results ==
=== Road ===
2017
1st Internationale Wielertrofee Jong Maar Moedig
6th Overall Ster ZLM Toer
2019
1st Mountains classification, Tour de Wallonie
2nd Overall Flèche du Sud

1st Mountains classification

4th Overall Tour of Belgium
2020
9th Dwars door het Hageland
2021
9th Overall Tour of Belgium
2024
9th Ronde van Limburg
2025
9th Overall Tour de Wallonie
2026
8th Brussels Cycling Classic

==== Grand Tour general classification results timeline ====
Grand Tour	2026
Giro d'Italia	58
Tour de France	—
Vuelta a España	—

Legend
—	Did not compete
DNF	Did not finish

=== Cyclo-cross ===
2010–2011
3rd Junior Hasselt
2012–2013
Under-23 Superprestige

3rd Hoogstraten

2013–2014
2nd National Under-23 Championships
Under-23 Superprestige

2nd Zonhoven
2nd Hoogstraten
3rd Middelkerke

5th UCI World Under-23 Championships
UCI Under-23 World Cup

5th Nommay

2014–2015
2nd National Under-23 Championships
Under-23 Bpost Bank Trophy

2nd Baal
2nd Lille
3rd Ronse
3rd Koppenberg
3rd Loenhout

Under-23 Superprestige

3rd Spa-Francorchamps

5th UEC European Under-23 Championships
2015–2016
Soudal Classics

1st Leuven

1st Bensheim
2nd Eeklo
Bpost Bank Trophy

3rd Baal

2016–2017
1st UEC European Championships
DVV Trophy

1st Baal

Soudal Classics

1st Niel
3rd Sint-Niklaas

2nd Ardooie
2nd Otegem
Superprestige

3rd Gavere
3rd Spa-Francorchamps

3rd Waterloo
UCI World Cup

4th Las Vegas
4th Heusden-Zolder

2017–2018
Soudal Classics

1st Niel
2nd Hasselt
2nd Sint-Niklaas

3rd Overall UCI World Cup

2nd Namur
3rd Bogense
3rd Zeven
3rd Nommay
4th Cauberg

2nd Overall DVV Trophy

2nd Koppenberg
3rd Essen
3rd Loenhout

Superprestige

2nd Gavere

2nd Brabant
2nd Ardooie
3rd UEC European Championships
3rd Otegem
3rd Waterloo
2018–2019
1st National Championships
1st Overall UCI World Cup

1st Waterloo
1st Iowa City
2nd Pontchâteau
2nd Hoogerheide
3rd Bern
3rd Koksijde
3rd Namur
4th Tábor
4th Heusden-Zolder

2nd Overall DVV Trophy

1st Koppenberg
2nd Niel
2nd Baal
2nd Brussels
3rd Antwerpen
3rd Loenhout
3rd Lille

Soudal Classics

1st Leuven

1st Overijse
2nd Overall Superprestige

2nd Boom
2nd Gavere
2nd Hoogstraten
3rd Gieten
3rd Ruddervoorde
3rd Zonhoven
3rd Diegem
3rd Middelkerke

2nd Oostmalle
3rd UCI World Championships
Brico Cross

3rd Lokeren
3rd Maldegem

3rd Otegem
3rd Ardooie
5th UEC European Championships
2019–2020
1st Overall UCI World Cup

2nd Iowa City
2nd Waterloo
2nd Bern
2nd Namur
2nd Nommay
2nd Hoogerheide
3rd Koksijde
5th Tábor

Superprestige

1st Boom
1st Zonhoven
2nd Middelkerke
3rd Ruddervoorde

DVV Trophy

1st Ronse
3rd Kortrijk
3rd Lille

Rectavit Series

1st Leuven

Ethias Cross

2nd Kruibeke
2nd Beringen
3rd Meulebeke
3rd Maldegem
3rd Hulst

2nd Oostmalle
3rd UCI World Championships
3rd National Championships
2020–2021
1st Overall Superprestige

1st Gieten
2nd Ruddervoorde
3rd Niel
3rd Boom

2nd Overall X²O Badkamers Trophy

1st Brussels
3rd Koppenberg

Ethias Cross

1st Kruibeke
1st Beringen
2nd Lokeren
2nd Bredene
2nd Eeklo
2nd Sint-Niklaas

2nd National Championships
3rd UCI World Championships
UCI World Cup

3rd Dendermonde
4th Tábor
5th Hulst
5th Overijse

5th UEC European Championships
2021–2022
1st Overall X²O Badkamers Trophy

1st Kortrijk
1st Lille
2nd Koppenberg
2nd Hamme
3rd Loenhout
3rd Herentals

2nd Overall Superprestige

1st Gieten
2nd Niel
2nd Boom
3rd Ruddervoorde
3rd Gavere

3rd Overall UCI World Cup

1st Zonhoven
2nd Besançon
2nd Flamanville
3rd Overijse
3rd Koksijde
3rd Namur
3rd Dendermonde
4th Fayetteville
4th Iowa City
4th Tábor
5th Hulst

Ethias Cross

3rd Meulebeke

4th UEC European Championships
2024–2025
1st Otegem
2nd Overall UCI World Cup

2nd Dublin
2nd Namur
2nd Besançon
4th Zonhoven
4th Dendermonde
4th Hoogerheide
5th Maasmechelen

2nd Overall X²O Badkamers Trophy

2nd Lille
3rd Koppenberg
3rd Koksijde

Superprestige

2nd Merksplas

3rd National Championships
2025–2026
1st UEC European Championships
1st Ardooie
1st Otegem
Exact Cross

2nd Mol

UCI World Cup

4th Gavere
5th Koksijde
5th Zonhoven
5th Hoogerheide
