= Annemarie Worst =

Dutch cyclist (born 1995)

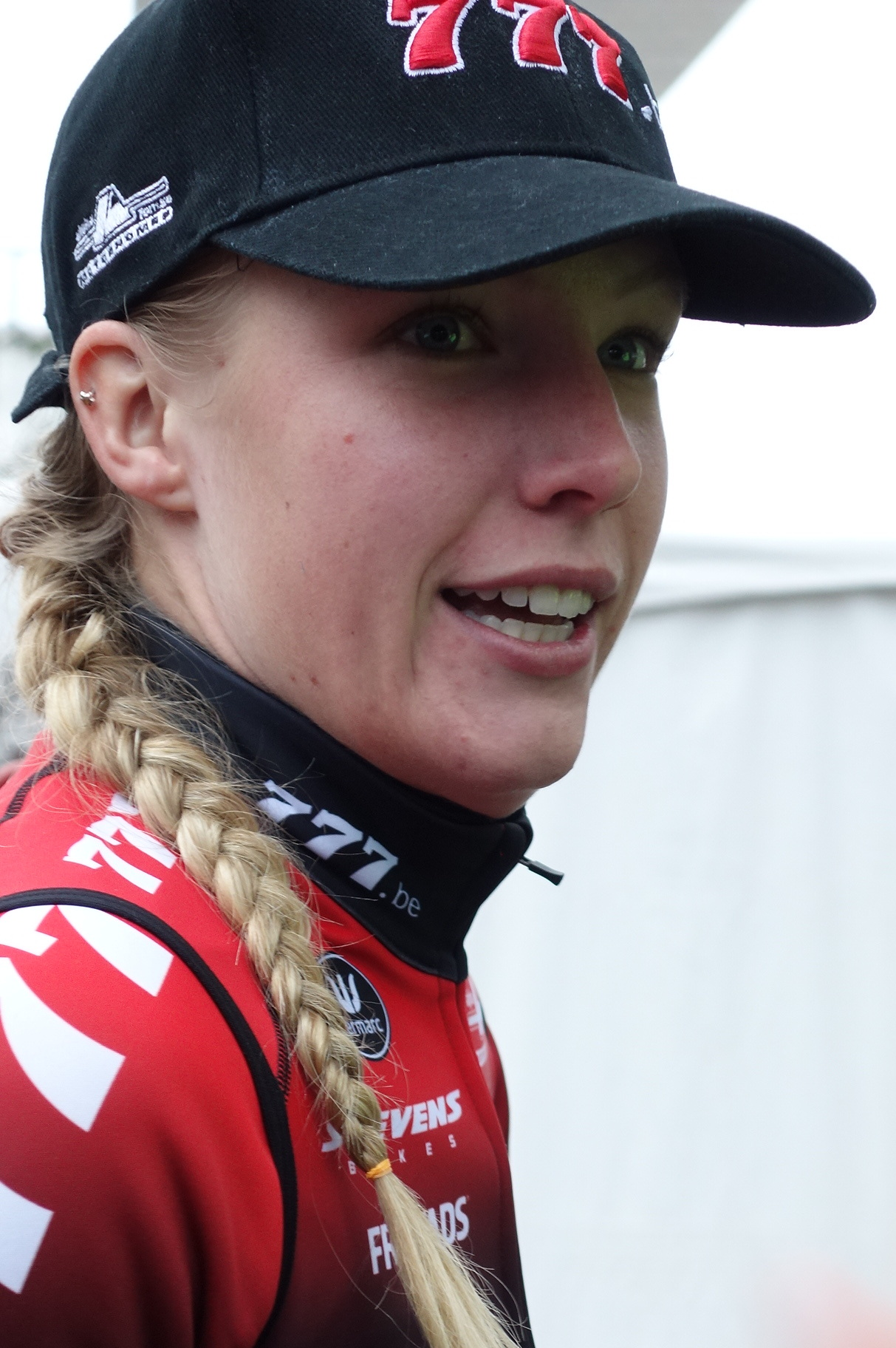
- Annemarie Worst in 2020

Personal information
- Full name: Annemarie Worst
- Born: 19 December 1995 (age 30) Harderwijk, Netherlands

Cycling career
- Sport: Cycling
- Current team: 777 (cyclo-cross); Fenix–Premier Tech (road)
- Disciplines: Cyclo-cross; Mountain biking; Road
- Role: Rider

Professional teams
- 2017–2018: ERA–Circus
- 2018–: Steylaerts–777
- 2020–: Ciclismo Mundial (road)

Major wins
- Cyclo-cross European Championships (2018) World Cup (2019–20) 4 individual wins (2019–20, 2021–22)
Medal record
Representing Netherlands
Women's Cyclo-cross
World Championships
Gold medal – first place	Bieles 2017	Women U23
Silver medal – second place	Oostende 2021	Elite
Silver medal – second place	Dübendorf 2020	Elite
European Championships
Gold medal – first place	Rosmalen 2018	Elite Women
Silver medal – second place	Rosmalen 2020	Elite Women
Bronze medal – third place	Silvelle 2019	Elite Women

Annemarie Worst (born 19 December 1995) is a Dutch cyclist, who currently competes in cyclo-cross for UCI Cyclo-cross Team 777, and in road cycling for UCI Women's Continental Team Fenix–Premier Tech. She became world under-23 cyclo-cross champion in 2017.

For the 2017–18 cyclo-cross season, Worst joined the ERA–Circus team, but she moved to Steylaerts–777 for the 2018–19 season. She won the European Championship and the Superprestige Gieten in 2018. During the 2019–20 season, she won the World Cup races in Bern, Tábor and Nommay, and won the overall classification.

== Major results ==
=== Mountain bike ===
2013
2nd Cross-country, National Junior Championships
2014
1st Under-23 Malmedy
2nd Cross-country, National Championships
2nd Zoetermeer
2015
Benelux Cup

1st Hesperange
2nd Esch-sur-Alzette

1st Landgraaf
2nd Næstved
2nd Érezée
2nd Solingen
3rd Nieuwkuijk
2016
Benelux Cup

1st Landgraaf
1st Esch-sur-Alzette
1st Sittard-Geleen
2nd Zoetermeer

1st Houffalize
National Championships

2nd Cross-country
3rd Eliminator

3rd Beringen
2017
1st Overall Club La Santa
3rd Cross-country, National Championships
UCI Under-23 XCO World Cup

4th Nové Město

2018
3rd Cross-country, National Championships
3 Nations Cup

3rd Velsen-Zuid–Spaarnwoude

2019
3 Nations Cup

1st Apeldoorn

2nd Cross-country, National Championships

=== Road ===
2022
6th Overall Belgium Tour

1st Stage 2

2023
1st Ronde van Boom

=== Cyclo-cross ===
2016–17
1st UCI World Under-23 Championships
3rd National Under-23 Championships
UCI World Cup

3rd Hoogerheide

2017–18
EKZ CrossTour

1st Baden

DVV Trophy

2nd Baal
3rd Lille

Brico Cross

2nd Maldegem

Superprestige

3rd Boom

3rd National Championships
3rd Oostmalle
2018–19
1st UEC European Championships
Superprestige

1st Gieten
2nd Ruddervoorde
2nd Diegem
2nd Hoogstraten

DVV Trophy

1st Hamme
3rd Koppenberg

UCI World Cup

2nd Bern
2nd Tábor
3rd Namur
3rd Koksijde

Brico Cross

2nd Hulst
3rd Ronse
3rd Maldegem

2nd Gullegem
2nd Oostmalle
3rd Wachtebeke
3rd Leuven
2019–20
1st Overall UCI World Cup

1st Bern
1st Tábor
1st Nommay
2nd Hoogerheide
3rd Namur
3rd Heusden-Zolder

2nd Overall DVV Trophy

1st Hamme
2nd Koppenberg
2nd Ronse
2nd Lille
2nd Brussels
3rd Kortrijk
3rd Loenhout
3rd Baal

3rd Overall Superprestige

1st Zonhoven
1st Diegem
3rd Middelkerke

Ethias Cross

1st Kruibeke
1st Beringen
1st Maldegem
2nd Meulebeke
2nd Hulst

1st Overijse
1st Oostmalle
Rectavit Series

2nd Leuven

2nd UCI World Championships
2nd National Championships
3rd UEC European Championships
2020–2021
X²O Badkamers Trophy

1st Koppenberg
3rd Antwerpen

2nd UCI World Championships
2nd UEC European Championships
Superprestige

2nd Gieten
2nd Ruddervoorde
3rd Heusden-Zolder

Ethias Cross

2nd Sint-Niklaas

2021–2022
UCI World Cup

1st Koksijde
3rd Tábor
3rd Hulst

Ethias Cross

1st Maldegem

1st Oostmalle
3rd Overall Superprestige

2nd Ruddervoorde
2nd Niel
2nd Merksplas
2nd Gavere
3rd Gieten
3rd Heusden-Zolder

3rd Overall X²O Badkamers Trophy

2nd Lille
3rd Herentals

2022–2023
USCX Series

1st Rochester I
1st Rochester II
1st Baltimore I
1st Baltimore II

Exact Cross

1st Sint-Niklaas
2nd Kruibeke
3rd Mol

1st Maldegem
1st Oostmalle
UCI World Cup

2nd Besançon
3rd Fayetteville
3rd Tábor

X²O Badkamers Trophy

3rd Herentals
3rd Lille
3rd Brussels

Superprestige

3rd Middelkerke

2023–2024
1st Ardooie
2nd Overall Superprestige

2nd Ruddervoorde
3rd Boom
3rd Niel

3rd Overall X²O Badkamers Trophy

3rd Herentals

Exact Cross

3rd Sint-Niklaas

3rd National Championships
UCI World Cup

4th Zonhoven

2024–2025
2nd Overall X²O Badkamers Trophy
UCI World Cup

4th Hulst
