= Eli Iserbyt =

Belgian cyclist (born 1997)

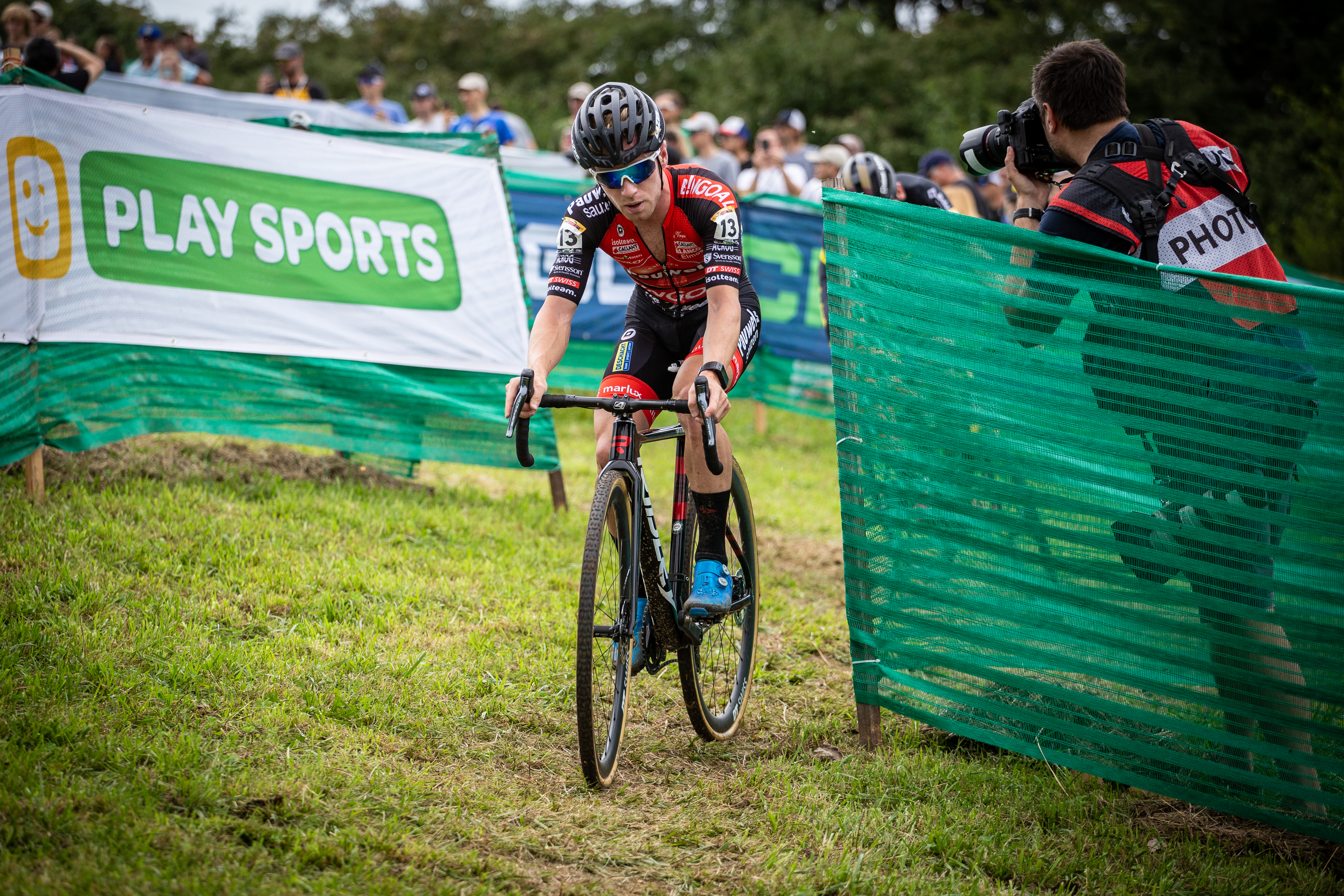
- Iserbyt in 2019 — true size caption

Personal information
- Full name: Eli Iserbyt
- Born: 22 October 1997 (age 28) Bavikhove, Belgium
- Height: 165 cm (5 ft 5 in)
- Weight: 56 kg (123 lb)

Cycling career
- Sport: Cycling
- Current team: Pauwels Sauzen–Altez Industriebouw Cycling Team
- Disciplines: Cyclo-cross; Road
- Role: Rider

Professional teams
- 2016: Telenet–Fidea
- 2016–2026: Marlux–Napoleon Games

Major wins
- Cyclo-cross European Championships (2020) National Championships (2024) World Cup (2021–22, 2023–24) 17 individual wins (2019–20, 2021–22—2024–25) Trophy (2019–20, 2020–21, 2022–23, 2024–25) Superprestige (2021–22, 2023–24)
Medal record
Men's cyclo-cross
Representing Belgium
World Championships
Gold medal – first place	2016 Heusden-Zolder	Under-23
Gold medal – first place	2018 Valkenburg	Under-23
Silver medal – second place	2015 Tábor	Junior
Silver medal – second place	2019 Bogense	Under-23
Bronze medal – third place	2022 Fayetteville	Elite
Bronze medal – third place	2023 Hoogerheide	Elite
European Championships
Gold medal – first place	2020 ’s-Hertogenbosch	Elite
Gold medal – first place	2017 Tábor	Under-23
Gold medal – first place	2014 Lorsch	Junior
Silver medal – second place	2019 Silvelle	Elite
Silver medal – second place	2018 Rosmalen	Under-23
Bronze medal – third place	2024 Pontevedra	Elite
Bronze medal – third place	2015 Huijbergen	Under-23

Eli Iserbyt (born 22 October 1997) is a former Belgian cyclo-cross and road cyclist until his retirement in January 2026, who rode for UCI Continental team Pauwels Sauzen–Altez Industriebouw Cycling Team. As a junior, he won the silver medal at the 2015 UCI Cyclo-cross World Championships. He won the gold medal in the men's under-23 event at the 2016 UCI Cyclo-cross World Championships in Heusden-Zolder and took another gold in the under-23 race at the 2017 UEC European Cyclo-cross Championships in Tábor. In 2018 he won another gold medal in the men's under-23 event at the World Championships in Valkenburg.

== Major results ==
=== Road ===
2015
4th Overall Sint-Martinusprijs Kontich

1st Mountains classification

2018
3rd Overall Boucles de la Mayenne

1st Young rider classification

10th Overall Flèche du Sud
2023
5th Overall Flèche du Sud

=== Cyclo-cross ===
2013–2014
1st National Junior Championships
Junior BPost Bank Trophy

1st Ronse

Junior Superprestige

2nd Diegem
2nd Middelkerke

5th Overall UCI Junior World Cup

2nd Tábor
3rd Rome
4th Valkenburg

2014–2015
1st UEC European Junior Championships
1st National Junior Championships
1st Overall UCI Junior World Cup

1st Cauberg
1st Heusden-Zolder
1st Hoogerheide
2nd Namur

1st Overall Junior Superprestige

1st Gieten
1st Zonhoven
1st Ruddervoorde
1st Gavere
1st Spa-Francorchamps
1st Diegem
1st Hoogstraten
2nd Middelkerke

Junior BPost Bank Trophy

1st Ronse
3rd Lille

Junior Soudal Classics

1st Leuven

1st Junior Overijse
1st Junior Oostmalle
2nd UCI World Junior Championships
2015–2016
1st UCI World Under-23 Championships
1st Overall UCI Under-23 World Cup

1st Koksijde
1st Namur
1st Lignières-en-Berry
2nd Cauberg
2nd Hoogerheide

1st Overall Under-23 Superprestige

1st Zonhoven
1st Ruddervoorde
1st Gavere
1st Hoogstraten
1st Middelkerke
3rd Gieten

Under-23 BPost Bank Trophy

1st Ronse
1st Hamme

1st Under-23 Overijse
3rd UEC European Under-23 Championships
2016–2017
UCI Under-23 World Cup

1st Rome
2nd Zeven
5th Namur

2nd Overall Under-23 DVV Trophy

1st Koppenberg
1st Essen
1st Loenhout
1st Baal
2nd Ronse
2nd Hamme
2nd Antwerpen
3rd Lille

Under-23 Superprestige

1st Gavere
2nd Ruddervoorde
2nd Hoogstraten
3rd Diegem

2017–2018
1st UCI World Under-23 Championships
1st UEC European Under-23 Championships
2nd Overall UCI Under-23 World Cup

1st Zeven
1st Hoogerheide
2nd Bogense
2nd Namur
2nd Heusden-Zolder
3rd Koksijde

1st Overall Under-23 DVV Trophy

1st Ronse
1st Hamme
1st Essen
1st Antwerpen
1st Loenhout
1st Baal
1st Lille
2nd Koppenberg

Under-23 Superprestige

1st Hoogstraten
2nd Middelkerke

2018–2019
2nd Overall UCI Under-23 World Cup

1st Bern
1st Heusden-Zolder
1st Hoogerheide
3rd Namur
5th Pontchâteau

2nd UCI World Under-23 Championships
2nd UEC European Under-23 Championships
3rd Hasselt
3rd Overall Under-23 Superprestige
2019–2020
1st Overall DVV Trophy

1st Koppenberg
2nd Ronse
2nd Loenhout
2nd Baal
2nd Brussels

2nd Overall UCI World Cup

1st Iowa City
1st Waterloo
1st Bern
1st Nommay
2nd Tábor
3rd Hoogerheide

2nd Overall Superprestige

1st Gieten
1st Gavere
2nd Diegem
3rd Zonhoven
3rd Middelkerke

Ethias Cross

1st Kruibeke
1st Maldegem
1st Hulst
2nd Eeklo
2nd Meulebeke

2nd UEC European Championships
2nd National Championships
2020–2021
1st UEC European Championships
1st Overall X²O Badkamers Trophy

1st Koppenberg
1st Kortrijk
2nd Antwerpen

2nd Overall Superprestige

1st Ruddervoorde
1st Boom
2nd Gieten
2nd Niel
2nd Merksplas
3rd Middelkerke

Ethias Cross

1st Lokeren
1st Sint-Niklaas
2nd Beringen
3rd Kruibeke
3rd Eeklo

UCI World Cup

2nd Tábor

2021–2022
1st Overall UCI World Cup

1st Waterloo
1st Iowa City
1st Overijse
1st Koksijde
1st Besançon
1st Flamanville
1st Hoogerheide
2nd Fayetteville
2nd Tábor
2nd Rucphen
2nd Hulst
3rd Zonhoven
4th Val di Sole
5th Namur

1st Overall Superprestige

1st Ruddervoorde
1st Niel
1st Merksplas
2nd Gavere
3rd Gieten
3rd Heusden-Zolder

2nd Overall X²O Badkamers Trophy

1st Koppenberg
2nd Kortrijk
2nd Brussels
3rd Baal
3rd Hamme

Ethias Cross

1st Lokeren
1st Beringen
1st Bredene
2nd Maldegem

3rd UCI World Championships
2022–2023
1st Overall X²O Badkamers Trophy

1st Baal
1st Brussels
2nd Koppenberg
2nd Hamme
3rd Kortrijk
3rd Herentals
3rd Lille

2nd Overall Superprestige

1st Ruddervoorde
1st Middelkerke
2nd Gullegem

3rd Overall UCI World Cup

1st Waterloo
1st Fayetteville
1st Tábor
3rd Maasmechelen
3rd Hulst
3rd Benidorm
5th Beekse Bergen

Exact Cross

1st Beringen
2nd Kruibeke
2nd Meulebeke
3rd Sint Niklaas

3rd UCI World Championships
2023–2024
1st National Championships
1st Overall UCI World Cup

1st Troyes
1st Flamanville
2nd Waterloo
2nd Maasmechelen
3rd Dublin
3rd Antwerpen
4th Dendermonde
4th Namur
4th Benidorm
5th Val di Sole
5th Hoogerheide

1st Overall Superprestige

1st Ruddervoorde
1st Overijse
1st Niel
2nd Merksplas
2nd Heusden-Zolder
3rd Boom
3rd Diegem

2nd Overall X²O Badkamers Trophy

1st Kortrijk
1st Brussels
3rd Koppenberg
3rd Hamme

Exact Cross

1st Maldegem
2nd Beringen

1st Otegem
2nd Ardooie
2024–2025
1st Overall X²O Badkamers Trophy

1st Baal
2nd Koppenberg
3rd Lille

UCI World Cup

1st Antwerpen
2nd Benidorm
4th Dublin
4th Hulst
4th Besançon

Exact Cross

1st Heerderstrand
1st Kortrijk
2nd Maldegem

Superprestige

2nd Overijse
2nd Gullegem
2nd Middelkerke

2nd Ardooie
3rd UEC European Championships

==== UCI World Cup results ====
Season	1	2	3	4	5	6	7	8	9	10	11	12	13	14	15	16	Rank	Points
2017–2018	IOW; 26	WAT; 11	KOK —	ZEV —	BOG —	NAM —	ZOL —	NOM —	HOO —								45	65
2018–2019	WAT; 7	IOW; 8	BER —	TAB —	KOK —	NAM —	ZOL —	PON —	HOO —								37	94
2019–2020	IOW; 1	WAT; 1	BER; 1	TAB; 2	KOK; 13	NAM; DNF	ZOL; 13	NOM; 1	HOO; 3								2	531
2020–2021	WAT; NH	DUB; NH	ZON; NH	KOK; NH	BES; NH	TAB; 2	ANT; NH	NAM; 31	DIE; NH	DEN —	HUL; DNF	VIL; NH	HOO; NH	OVE —			18	30
2021–2022	WAT; 1	FAY; 2	IOW; 1	ZON; 3	OVE; 1	TAB; 2	KOK; 1	ANT; NH	BES; 1	VAL; 4	RUC; 2	NAM; 5	DEN; 9	HUL; 2	FLA; 1	HOO; 1	1	485
2022–2023	WAT; 1	FAY; 1	TAB; 1	MAA; 3	BER; 5	OVE; 7	HUL; 3	ANT; 6	DUB; 7	VAL; DNF	GAV —	ZON —	BEN; 3	BES; 10			3	290
2023–2024	WAT; 2	MAA; 2	DEN; 4	TRO; 1	DUB; 3	FLA; 1	VAL; 5	NAM; 4	ANT; 3	GAV; 6	HUL; DNF	ZON; 6	BEN; 4	HOO; 5			1	338
2024–2025	ANT; 1	DUB; 4	CAB; NH	NAM; DNF	HUL; 4	ZON; 8	GAV —	BES; 4	DEN; 11	BEN; 2	MAA; 18	HOO; 6					5	197

== Retirement ==
In February 2025, Iserbyt underwent surgery to an artery in the groin region, and despite attempts to fix the circulation problems and nerve compression on his hip, he announced on an Instagram post the 8 January 2026 his retirement of professional cycling at the age of 28. Doctors have told him it is "medically no longer responsible" for him to continue cycling, "recreationally, sportively, and at a high level", thus marking the end of his pro cycling career.
