= Alice Maria Arzuffi =

Italian cyclist

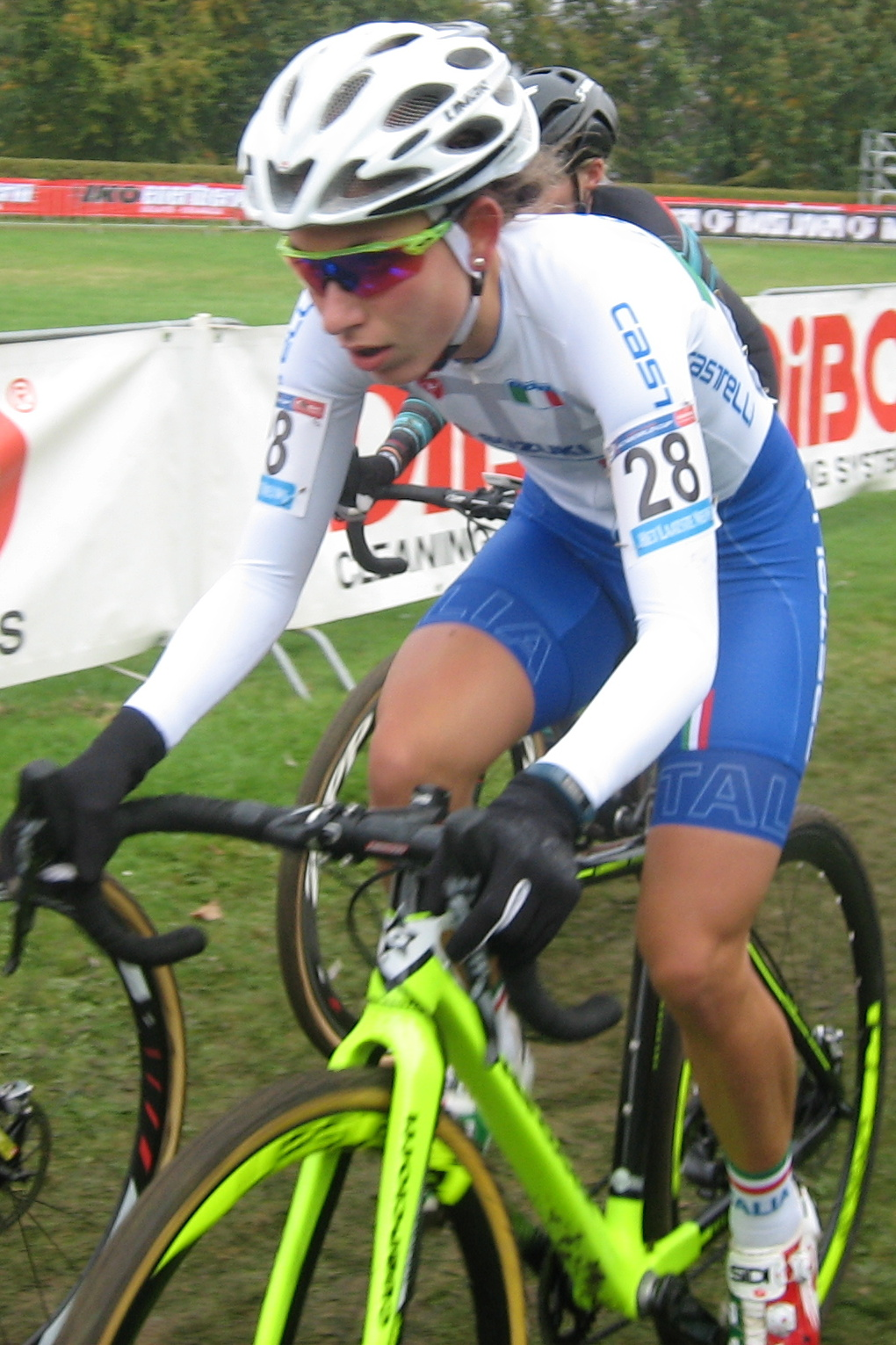
- Arzuffi in the 2016 Cauberg Cyclo-cross

Personal information
- Full name: Alice Maria Arzuffi
- Born: 19 November 1994 (age 31) Domodossola, Italy

Cycling career
- Sport: Cycling
- Current team: Laboral Kutxa–Fundación Euskadi
- Disciplines: Road; Cyclo-cross
- Role: Rider

Professional teams
- 2013: Faren–Let's Go Finland
- 2014: Astana BePink Women Team
- 2015: Inpa Sottoli Giusfredi
- 2016–2017: Lensworld–Zannata
- 2017–2021: Steylaerts–Betfirst (cyclo-cross)
- 2018: Bizkaia Durango–Euskadi Murias (road)
- 2019: Valcar–Cylance (road)
- 2020: Bizkaia–Durango (road)
- 2021–2022: Valcar–Travel & Service (road)
- 2023–2024: Ceratizit–WNT Pro Cycling
- 2025–: Laboral Kutxa–Fundación Euskadi

Major wins
- Cyclo-cross National Championships (2021)
Medal record
Representing Italy
Women's Cyclo-cross
European Championships
Bronze medal – third place	Tabor 2017	Elite Women
Women's gravel bicycle racing
European Championships
Bronze medal – third place	2024 Asiago	Elite

Alice Maria Arzuffi (born 19 November 1994) is an Italian professional racing cyclist, who currently rides for UCI Women's ProTeam Laboral Kutxa–Fundación Euskadi.

== Major results ==
=== Road ===
2014
8th 7-Dorpenomloop Aalburg
2015
8th Acht van Westerveld
2016
7th Holland Hills Classic
2017
6th Giro del Trentino Alto Adige-Südtirol
2018
4th La Classique Morbihan
6th Overall Gracia–Orlová
2019
7th Overall Women's Tour de Yorkshire

=== Cyclo-cross ===
2013–2014
1st Illnau
2nd Fae' di Oderzo
3rd Milan
2014–2015
Giro d'Italia Cross

1st Fiuggi
2nd Rome
2nd Padova
2nd Rossano Veneto
2nd Isola d'Elba

1st Milan
2nd National Championships
3rd Beromünster
2015–2016
1st National Under-23 Championships
Giro d'Italia Cross

1st Rome
1st Fiuggi

1st Beromünster
1st Città di Schio
2nd UEC European Under-23 Championships
2nd Illnau
3rd Fae' di Oderzo
2016–2017
1st Fae' di Oderzo
1st Milan
2nd National Championships
2nd Woerden
UCI World Cup

3rd Zeven

2017–2018
Brico Cross

1st Bredene

Soudal Classics

2nd Niel

2nd National Championships
2nd Milan
3rd UEC European Championships
2018–2019
Superprestige

1st Gavere
2nd Boom
3rd Gieten

2nd National Championships
DVV Trophy

2nd Koppenberg

Brico Cross

2nd Geraardsbergen
2nd Ronse

2nd Wachtebeke
UCI World Cup

3rd Tábor

2019–2020
Superprestige

1st Boom
2nd Gavere

2nd National Championships
DVV Trophy

3rd Koppenberg

3rd Overijse
2020–2021
1st National Championships
2021–2022
2nd San Colombano

=== Gravel ===
2024
3rd UEC European Championships
