= Laurens Sweeck =

Belgian cyclist (born 1993)

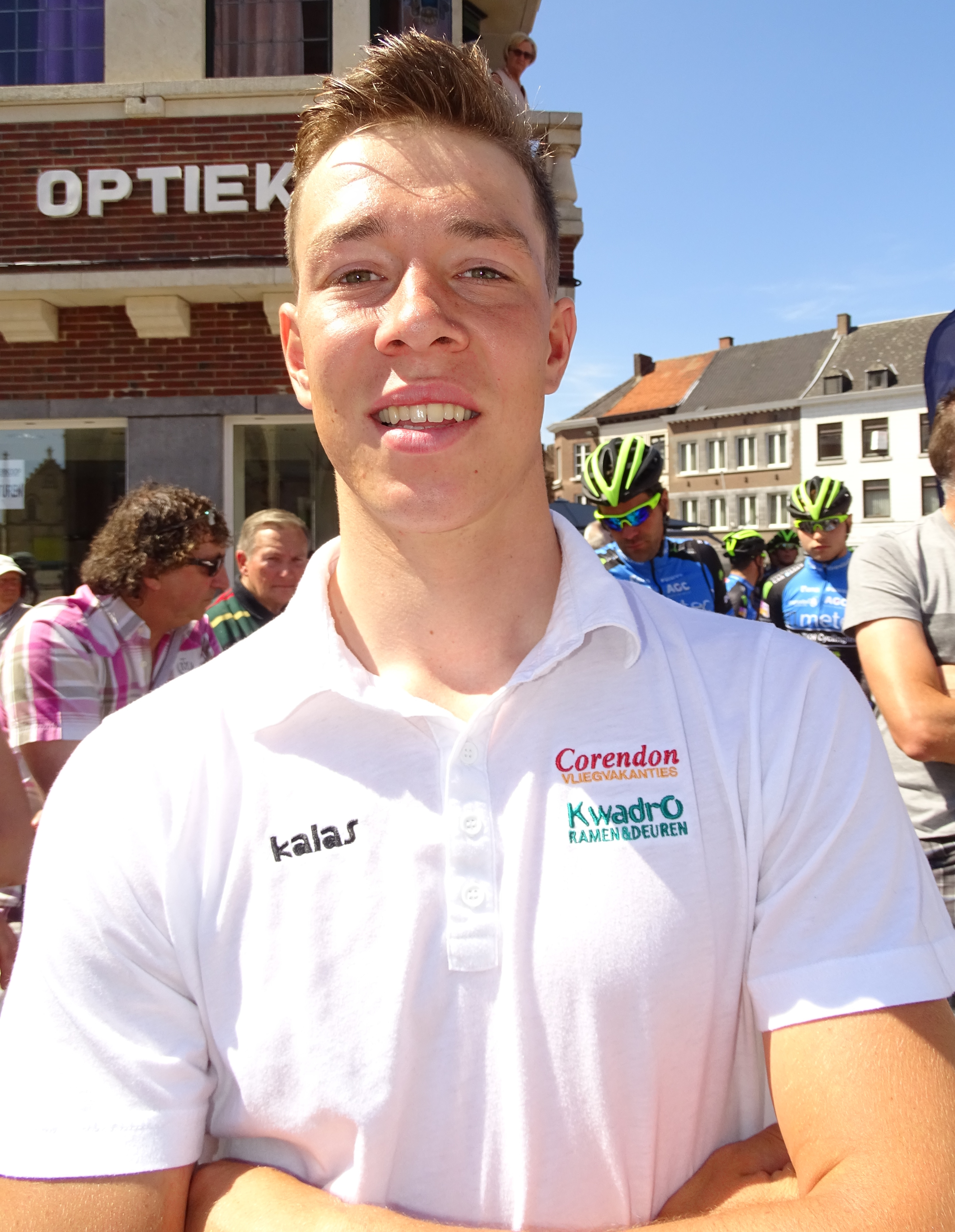
- Sweeck in 2015

Personal information
- Full name: Laurens Sweeck
- Born: 17 December 1993 (age 32) Leuven, Belgium
- Height: 1.79 m (5 ft 10 in)
- Weight: 71 kg (157 lb)

Cycling career
- Sport: Cycling
- Current team: Alpecin–Premier Tech Development Team (road); Crelan–Fristads (Cyclo-cross)
- Disciplines: Cyclo-cross; Road
- Role: Rider

Professional teams
- 2014–2018: Kwadro–Stannah
- 2018–2019: Pauwels Sauzen–Vastgoedservice
- 2019–2022: Pauwels Sauzen–Bingoal
- 2022–: Crelan–Fristads
- 2023–: Alpecin–Deceuninck Development Team

Major wins
- Cyclo-cross National Championships (2020) World Cup (2022–23) 2 individual wins (2022–23) Superprestige (2019–20)
Medal record
Men's cyclo-cross
Representing Belgium
World Championships
Bronze medal – third place	2023 Hoogerheide	Team relay
European Championships
Bronze medal – third place	2018 Rosmalen	Elite
Bronze medal – third place	2019 Silvelle	Elite
Bronze medal – third place	2022 Namur	Elite

Laurens Sweeck (born 17 December 1993) is a Belgian cyclo-cross and road cyclist, who currently rides for UCI Continental team Alpecin–Premier Tech Development Team for road racing and Crelan–Fristads for cyclo-cross. He represented his nation in the men's elite event at the 2016 UCI Cyclo-cross World Championships in Heusden-Zolder.

Sweeck is the grandson of former cyclist Alfons Sweeck. His twin brother Diether Sweeck and his older brother Hendrick Sweeck are also professional cyclists.

== Major results ==
=== Road ===
2015
1st Stage 5 Tour de Namur
2016
Triptyque Ardennais

1st Prologue & Stage 3

1st Stage 4 (ITT) Tour de Namur
2017
1st Grote Prijs Jean-Pierre Monseré
2nd Overall Tour de Namur

1st Stages 3, 4 (ITT) & 5

2nd Overall Triptyque Ardennais

1st Stage 3

2nd Overall Tour de Liège
10th Halle–Ingooigem
2022
5th Heistse Pijl
2023
3rd Overall Tour du Pays de Montbéliard

1st Stage 2

2024
1st SD WORX BW Classic

=== Cyclo-cross ===
2014–2015
1st National Under-23 Championships
2nd Overall Under-23 Superprestige

1st Ruddervoorde
1st Hoogstraten
1st Middelkerke
2nd Gieten
3rd Zonhoven
3rd Gavere

2nd Overall UCI Under-23 World Cup

1st Heusden-Zolder
1st Hoogerheide
3rd Namur

2nd UCI World Under-23 Championships
2nd UEC European Under-23 Championships
2nd Antwerpen
2nd Maldegem
2nd Mol
2nd Under-23 Hasselt
3rd Oostmalle
2015–2016
BPost Bank Trophy

1st Sint-Niklaas

EKZ CrossTour

1st Baden

2nd National Championships
3rd Mol
3rd Neerpelt
2016–2017
Soudal Classics

1st Hasselt
1st Neerpelt
3rd Leuven

UCI World Cup

2nd Heusden-Zolder
3rd Las Vegas
3rd Iowa City

Brico Cross

2nd Bredene

3rd Overall Superprestige

3rd Gieten
3rd Zonhoven
3rd Ruddervoorde
3rd Middelkerke

DVV Trophy

3rd Hamme

3rd National Championships
3rd Otegem
2017–2018
Brico Cross

1st Maldegem
2nd Hulst

Soudal Classics
1st Neerpelt

2nd Niel

1st Iowa City
1st Las Vegas
UCI World Cup

2nd Heusden-Zolder
3rd Iowa City

DVV Trophy

2nd Essen
3rd Lille
3rd Antwerpen

3rd Overall Superprestige

2nd Boom
2nd Hoogstraten
3rd Gieten
3rd Diegem

2nd National Championships
2nd Oostmalle
2018–2019
Brico Cross

1st Essen
2nd Lokeren

1st Neerpelt
3rd UEC European Championships
UCI World Cup

3rd Waterloo

DVV Trophy

3rd Niel
3rd Hamme
3rd Baal

2019–2020
1st National Championships
1st Overall Superprestige

1st Middelkerke
2nd Ruddervoorde
2nd Zonhoven
3rd Gavere

Ethias Cross

1st Eeklo
2nd Essen

Rectavit Series

1st Neerpelt
2nd Niel

1st Waterloo
1st Oostmalle
UCI World Cup

2nd Koksijde
2nd Heusden-Zolder
3rd Nommay

DVV Trophy

2nd Hamme

3rd UEC European Championships
2020–2021
Superprestige

1st Niel
1st Middelkerke
3rd Gieten
3rd Merksplas

Ethias Cross

1st Leuven
2nd Kruibeke
3rd Lokeren

X²O Badkamers Trophy

1st Lille
3rd Hamme

1st Oostmalle
2nd Mol
2021–2022
X²O Badkamers Trophy

1st Hamme

Ethias Cross

1st Leuven
1st Maldegem
2nd Bredene
2nd Meulebeke

1st Oostmalle
1st Ardooie
UCI World Cup

2nd Koksijde

2nd National Championships
Superprestige

3rd Merksplas

2022–2023
1st Overall UCI World Cup

1st Maasmechelen
1st Beekse Bergen
2nd Waterloo
2nd Fayetteville
2nd Hulst
2nd Dublin
2nd Besançon
3rd Zonhoven

Superprestige

1st Niel
1st Merksplas
2nd Ruddervoorde
3rd Middelkerke

X²O Badkamers Trophy

1st Lille
3rd Koksijde

Exact Cross

1st Sint Niklaas
3rd Kruibeke

1st Otegem
1st Oostmalle
2nd National Championships
2nd Maldegem
3rd Team relay, UCI World Championships
3rd UEC European Championships
3rd Ardooie
2023–2024
UCI World Cup

2nd Dublin
3rd Maasmechelen
3rd Dendermonde
3rd Zonhoven
4th Antwerpen

2nd Woerden
2024–2025
Superprestige

1st Niel
1st Merksplas
1st Diegem
2nd Mol

X²O Badkamers Trophy

1st Koksijde
1st Lille
3rd Herentals

Exact Cross

1st Essen
1st Maldegem
3rd Loenhout

2nd National Championships
2nd Otegem
2nd Oostmalle
2025–2026
Superprestige

1st Niel

UCI World Cup

2nd Tábor
2nd Antwerpen
2nd Koksijde
3rd Terralba
3rd Dendermonde
5th Flamanville

Exact Cross

2nd Meulebeke
