= 2017–18 Cyclo-cross Superprestige =

Details
- Location: Belgium
- Races: 8

Champions
- Male individual champion: Mathieu van der Poel (NED)
- Female individual champion: Sanne Cant (BEL)

The 2017–18 Cyclo-cross Superprestige – also known as the Telenet Superprestige for sponsorship reasons – is a season long cyclo-cross competition held in Belgium and the Netherlands.

== Calendar ==
=== Men's competition ===
Date	Race	Winner	Team	Competition leader	Ref
1 October	Gieten	Mathieu van der Poel (NED)	Beobank–Corendon	Mathieu van der Poel (NED)	
15 October	Zonhoven	Mathieu van der Poel (NED)	Beobank–Corendon	Mathieu van der Poel (NED)	
21 October	Boom	Wout van Aert (BEL)	Crelan–Charles	Wout Van Aert (BEL)	
29 October	Ruddervoorde	Mathieu van der Poel (NED)	Beobank–Corendon	Mathieu van der Poel (NED)	
12 November	Gavere	Wout van Aert (BEL)	Crelan–Charles	Wout Van Aert (BEL)	
30 December	Diegem	Mathieu van der Poel (NED)	Beobank–Corendon	Wout Van Aert (BEL)	
11 February	Hoogstraten	Mathieu van der Poel (NED)	Corendon–Circus	Mathieu van der Poel (NED)	
17 February	Middelkerke	Mathieu van der Poel (NED)	Corendon–Circus	Mathieu van der Poel (NED)	

=== Women's competition ===
Date	Race	Winner	Team	Competition leader	Ref
1 October	Gieten	Maud Kaptheijns (NED)	Crelan–Charles	Maud Kaptheijns (NED)	
15 October	Zonhoven	Maud Kaptheijns (NED)	Crelan–Charles	Maud Kaptheijns (NED)	
21 October	Cyclo-cross Boom	Maud Kaptheijns (NED)	Crelan–Charles	Maud Kaptheijns (NED)	
29 October	Ruddervoorde	Maud Kaptheijns (NED)	Crelan–Charles	Maud Kaptheijns (NED)	
12 November	Gavere	Ellen Van Loy (BEL)	Telenet–Fidea Lions	Maud Kaptheijns (NED)	
30 December	Diegem	Sanne Cant (BEL)	Beobank–Corendon	Maud Kaptheijns (NED)	
11 February	Hoogstraten	Sanne Cant (BEL)	Beobank–Corendon	Sanne Cant (BEL)	
17 February	Middelkerke	Sanne Cant (BEL)	Beobank–Corendon	Sanne Cant (BEL)	

== Season standings ==
In each race, the top 15 riders gain points, going from 15 points for the winner decreasing by one point per position to 1 point for the rider finishing in 15th position. In case of ties in the total score of two or more riders, the following tie breakers exist: most races started, most races won, best result in the last race.

Standings after six races:

=== Men ===
Pos.	Rider	Team	GIE	ZON	BOO	RUD	GAV	DIE	HOO	MID	Points
1	(Belgium) Wout Van Aert	Crelan–Charles	2	2	1	2	1	2			86
2	(Netherlands) Mathieu van der Poel	Beobank–Corendon	1	1	4	1	3	1			85
3	(Netherlands) Lars van der Haar	Telenet–Fidea Lions	4	3	3	3	6	13			64
4	(Belgium) Laurens Sweeck	ERA–Circus	3	5	2	5	Ret	3			62
5	(Belgium) Toon Aerts	Telenet–Fidea Lions	9	8	7	4	2	4			62
6	(Belgium) Quinten Hermans	Telenet–Fidea Lions	5	6	6	13	7	10			49
7	(Belgium) Kevin Pauwels	Marlux–Napoleon Games	7	12	8	10	8	6			45
8	(Belgium) Jens Adams	Pauwels Sauzen–Vastgoedservice	8	9	5	14	11	14			35
9	(Belgium) Tom Meeusen	Beobank–Corendon	11	11	18	23	5	7			30
10	(Netherlands) David van der Poel	Beobank–Corendon	13	4	Ret	9	18	8			30
11	(Belgium) Tim Merlier	Crelan–Charles	12	13	9	8	14	12			28
12	(Czech Republic) Michael Boroš	Pauwels Sauzen–Vastgoedservice	19	7	10	12	16	9			26
13	(Belgium) Michael Vanthourenhout	Marlux–Napoleon Games	Ret	Ret	12	6	9	11			26
14	(Belgium) Diether Sweeck	ERA–Circus	10	10	21	22	12	20			16
15	(Belgium) Gianni Vermeersch	Steylaerts–Verona	6	17	16	11	Ret	Ret			15
16	(Belgium) Klaas Vantornout	Marlux–Napoleon Games	DNS	Ret	DNS	16	4	DNS			12
17	(Germany) Marcel Meisen	Steylaerts–FirstBet	DNS	DNS	DNS	DNS	Ret	5			11
18	(Belgium) Eli Iserbyt	Marlux–Napoleon Games	16	Ret	DNS	7	Ret	26			9
19	(Belgium) Vincent Baestaens	VZW Koninklijke Stoempersclub	15	Ret	15	18	10	24			8
20	(Netherlands) Joris Nieuwenhuis	Development Team Sunweb	14	Ret	13	15	17	17			6
21	(Belgium) Dieter Vanthourenhout	Marlux–Napoleon Games	17	15	11	17	Ret	Ret			6
22	(Belgium) Nicolas Cleppe	Telenet–Fidea Lions	25	18	17	24	13	16			3
23	(Belgium) Rob Peeters	Pauwels Sauzen–Vastgoedservice	22	16	14	DNS	19	DNS			2
24	(Belgium) Daan Hoeyberghs	Steylaerts–Verona	24	14	DNS	DSQ	22	DNS			2
25	(Netherlands) Stan Godrie	Crelan–Charles	18	19	19	19	20	15			1
26	(Belgium) Joeri Adams	Kalas–H.Essers Cycling Team	23	Ret	Ret	26	15	DNS			1
Pos.	Rider	Team	GIE	ZON	BOO	RUD	GAV	DIE	HOO	MID	Points

=== Women (Top 5) ===
	Rider	Team	Points
1	Sanne Cant (BEL)	Beobank–Corendon	107
2	Maud Kaptheijns (NED)	Crelan–Charles	105
3	Annemarie Worst (NED)	ERA Real Estate–Circus	77
4	Nikki Brammeier (GBR)	Boels Dolmans Cyclingteam	66
5	Ellen Van Loy (BEL)	Telenet Fidea Lions	64
