= 2019–20 Cyclo-cross Superprestige =

Cyclo-cross competition held in Belgium and the Netherlands

Details
- Location: Belgium & Netherlands
- Races: 8 (Note: Later reduced to 7 due to the cancellation of the Merksplas event due to storm Ciara.)

Champions
- Male individual champion: Laurens Sweeck (BEL) (Pauwels Sauzen–Bingoal)
- Female individual champion: Ceylin del Carmen Alvarado (NED) (Alpecin–Fenix)

The 2019–20 Cyclo-cross Superprestige – also known as the Telenet Superprestige for sponsorship reasons – is a season-long cyclo-cross competition held in Belgium and the Netherlands.

== Calendar ==
=== Men's competition ===
Date	Race	Winner	Team	Competition leader
13 October	Gieten	Eli Iserbyt (BEL)	Pauwels Sauzen–Bingoal	Eli Iserbyt (BEL)
19 October	Boom	Toon Aerts (BEL)	Telenet–Fidea Lions	Quinten Hermans (BEL)
27 October	Gavere	Eli Iserbyt (BEL)	Pauwels Sauzen–Bingoal	Lars van der Haar (NED)
3 November	Ruddervoorde	Mathieu van der Poel (NED)	Corendon–Circus	Toon Aerts (BEL)
8 December	Zonhoven	Toon Aerts (BEL)	Telenet–Fidea Lions	Toon Aerts (BEL)
29 December	Diegem	Mathieu van der Poel (NED)	Corendon–Circus	Laurens Sweeck (BEL)
9 February	Merksplas	Races cancelled due to stormy weather		
15 February	Middelkerke	Laurens Sweeck (BEL)	Pauwels Sauzen–Bingoal	Laurens Sweeck (BEL)

=== Women's competition ===
Date	Race	Winner	Team	Competition leader
13 October	Gieten	Ceylin del Carmen Alvarado (NED)	Corendon–Circus	Ceylin del Carmen Alvarado (NED)
19 October	Boom	Alice Maria Arzuffi (ITA)	777	Sanne Cant (BEL)
27 October	Gavere	Yara Kastelijn (NED)	777	Yara Kastelijn (NED)
3 November	Ruddervoorde	Ceylin del Carmen Alvarado (NED)	Corendon–Circus	Ceylin del Carmen Alvarado (NED)
8 December	Zonhoven	Annemarie Worst (NED)	777	Ceylin del Carmen Alvarado (NED)
29 December	Diegem	Annemarie Worst (NED)	777	Ceylin del Carmen Alvarado (NED)
9 February	Merksplas	Races cancelled due to stormy weather		
15 February	Middelkerke	Ceylin del Carmen Alvarado (NED)	Alpecin–Fenix	Ceylin del Carmen Alvarado (NED)
