= Bart Wellens =

Belgian cyclist

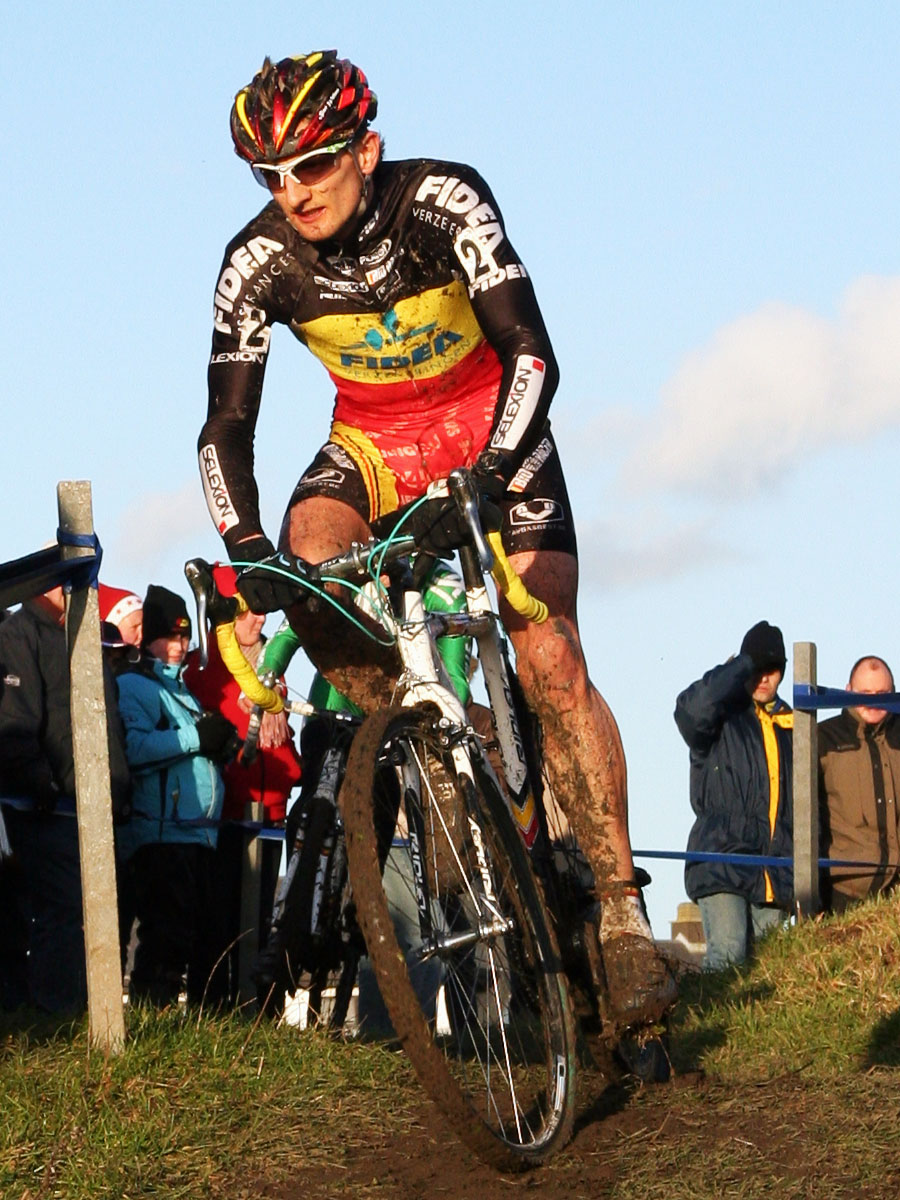
- Wellens at the 2007 Middelkerke race.

Personal information
- Full name: Bart Wellens
- Born: 10 August 1978 (age 48) Vorselaar, Belgium

Cycling career
- Sport: Cycling
- Current team: 777
- Disciplines: Cyclo-cross; Road
- Role: Rider (retired); Team manager

Professional team
- 2000–2015: Spaarselect

Managerial teams
- 2017–2019: Beobank–Corendon
- 2018–: Steylaerts–Betfirst

Major wins
- Cyclo-cross World Championships (2003, 2004) National Championships (2004, 2007) World Cup (2002–03) 7 individual wins (1999–00, 2000–01, 2002–03, 2003–04, 2005–06, 2006–07) Superprestige (2003–04) Trophy (2003–04)
Medal record
Representing Belgium
Men's cyclo-cross
World Championships
Gold medal – first place	2003 Monopoli	Elite
Gold medal – first place	2004 Pontchâteau	Elite
Gold medal – first place	2000 Sint-Michielsgestel	Under-23
Silver medal – second place	2006 Zeddam	Elite

Bart Wellens (born 10 August 1978) is a Belgian former professional cyclo-cross and road cyclist. He now works as the team manager of UCI Cyclo-cross Team 777.

== Career ==
Wellens was born in Vorselaar. In the Under 23 category, Wellens battled Sven Nys. Wellens won the Under 23 Belgian championships in 1997 beating Nys while Nys got revenge at the UCI Under 23 World Cyclo-Cross championships a month later. Wellens had to settle for second place. The following year Wellens again finished second to Nys at the World Championships. Nys then left the category and Wellens became the Under 23 World Champion for two years in a row. Wellens turned professional in 2000 with the Spaar Select team. In 2002/03 season, Wellens won the World Cup and then won the Elite World Championships.

In the following season 2003/04 he dominated the sport and beat rival Sven Nys in both the Gazet van Antwerpen and the Superprestige series. Wellens also beat Nys to become Belgian champion and as defending champion Wellens retained his World title after narrowly winning a sprint against Mario De Clercq. With these wins together with a third place overall in the World Cup, Wellens was very close to being the first cyclist to win the Grand Slam of cyclo-cross. Entering the final World Cup event where there were double points on offer, Wellens needed to win or that place in the top five ahead of Nys. However, in the end it was Richard Groenendaal who won the race and took the World Cup lead. Wellens could not compete in the final events of the Superprestige and the Gazet van Antwerpen due to injury, despite having already won both classifications.

Wellens started the 2004/05 season as World Champion but the season started poorly with a lack of form followed by injury. However his form returned toward the end of the season where he won the Grand Prix Rouwmoer in Essen, a Gazet van Antwerpen race.

In the 2005 edition of the Vlaamse Druivenveldrit Overijse, Wellens kicked a spectator who was allegedly throwing beer at him. Wellens went on to win the event after Boom slipped in the final lap and initially was awarded the win despite the threat of disqualification. Several days later after a meeting of the three race commissionaires and the UCI, Wellens was disqualified and Boom was awarded the win. Later Wellens was served with a ban from racing during the first month (September) of the following season (2006/07).

== Personal life ==
His younger brother Geert also competed professionally as a cyclist, including a year with his brother. He starred in the reality television series Wellens en Wee on Flemish TV-channel VT4. In this series, Wellens together with his parents, Lucien and Wiske, and his other teammates were shown in their daily lives and preparations for the weekend races.

== Major results ==
=== Road ===
2008
1st Stage 1 Volta a Lleida
2010
4th Overall Czech Cycling Tour

=== Cyclo-cross ===
1995–1996
1st National Junior Championships
1996–1997
1st National Under-23 Championships
2nd UCI World Under-23 Championships
1997–1998
1st National Under-23 Championships
2nd UCI World Under-23 Championships
Superprestige

3rd Gieten

1998–1999
1st UCI World Under-23 Championships
1st National Under-23 Championships
2nd Overall Superprestige

1st Hoogstraten
2nd Diegem
3rd Gavere
3rd Gieten
3rd Overijse
3rd Surhuisterveen

UCI World Cup

2nd Koksijde

1999–2000
1st UCI World Under-23 Championships
1st National Under-23 Championships
UCI World Cup

1st Kalmthout

Gazet van Antwerpen

1st Essen
2nd Rijkevorsel
2nd Lille
2nd Oostmalle

Superprestige

2nd Hoogstraten
2nd Surhuisterveen
3rd Silvelle

2000–2001
2nd Overall UCI World Cup

1st Tábor
2nd Bergamo
3rd Heusden-Zolder

2nd Overall Superprestige

1st Harnes
2nd Ruddervorde
2nd Gieten
3rd Sint-Michielsgestel

2nd Loenhout
3rd Overall Gazet van Antwerpen

1st Oostmalle
2nd Lille

3rd National Championships
2001–2002
1st Ardooie
1st Contern
1st Vossem
1st Woerden
2nd Eeklo
2nd Veldegem
3rd Overall Superprestige

1st Ruddervorde
2nd Gieten
3rd Sint-Michielsgestel
3rd Vorselaar

3rd Overall Gazet van Antwerpen

1st Kalmthout
1st Lille
3rd Niel

3rd Overall UCI World Cup

2nd Monopoli
2nd Igorre
3rd Heerlen

2002–2003
1st UCI World Championships
1st Overall UCI World Cup

1st Frankfurt
1st Wetzikon
2nd Hoogerheide
3rd Liévin

1st Eeklo
1st Overijse
1st Tábor
2nd Overall Superprestige

1st Gavere
1st Vorselaar
2nd Gieten
3rd Sint-Michielsgestel
3rd Hoogstraten
3rd Harnes

2nd Overall Gazet van Antwerpen

1st Niel
2nd Essen
2nd Lille
2nd Oostmalle
3rd Koppenbergcross

2nd Hamme
2nd Woerden
2nd Zonnebeke
3rd National Championships
3rd Eernegem
2003–2004
1st UCI World Championships
1st National Championships
1st Overall Superprestige

1st Ruddervorde
1st Gavere
1st Gieten
1st Diegem
2nd Sint-Michielsgestel
2nd Harnes
3rd Hoogstraten

1st Overall Gazet van Antwerpen

1st Koppenbergcross
1st Niel
1st Kalmthout
1st Essen
1st Loenhout

1st Dottenijs
1st Harderwijk
1st Hooglede
1st Milan
1st Overijse
1st Surhuisterveen
1st Vossem
1st Woerden
2nd Middelkerke
3rd Overall UCI World Cup

1st Nommay
2nd Torino
2nd Wetzikon

3rd Eernegem
2004–2005
Gazet van Antwerpen

1st Essen
2nd Baal

Superprestige

2nd Gieten
2nd Vorselaar

2nd Heerlen
2005–2006
UCI World Cup

1st Igorre
2nd Kalmthout
3rd Wetzikon

1st Ardooie
1st Dottenijs
1st Erpe-Mere
1st Neerpelt
2nd Overall Gazet van Antwerpen

1st Essen
2nd Koppenbergcross
3rd Niel

2nd UCI World Championships
3rd Overall Superprestige

1st Ruddervorde
1st Sint-Michielsgestel
2nd Hamme
3rd Vorselaar

3rd National Championships
3rd Eeklo
2006–2007
1st National Championships
1st Lebbeke
1st Middelkerke
1st Veghel-Eerde
2nd Overall UCI World Cup

1st Milan
2nd Aigle
2nd Tábor
2nd Koksijde
2nd Igorre
2nd Nommay

2nd Neerpelt
Gazet van Antwerpen

1st Niel
2nd Hasselt
2nd Essen

3rd Overall Superprestige

2nd Hamme
2nd Diegem
3rd Ruddervorde

2007–2008
1st Zonhoven
1st Zonnebeke
2nd Overall Gazet van Antwerpen

1st Niel
2nd Oostmalle
2nd Lille
2nd Hasselt
2nd Koppenbergcross

UCI World Cup

2nd Pijnacker
2nd Igorre
2nd Hofstade
2nd Liévin
2nd Hoogerheide

2nd Overall Superprestige

3rd Ruddervorde
3rd Hamme
3rd Gavere
3rd Veghel-Eerde

2nd National Championships
2nd Eeklo
2nd Overijse
3rd Antwerpen
3rd Ardooie
3rd Dottenijs
3rd Harderwijk
3rd Neerpelt
2008–2009
1st Asteasu
1st Sint-Niklaas
2nd Overall Gazet van Antwerpen

1st Hasselt
3rd Lille

2nd Overall UCI World Cup

3rd Nommay

2nd Lebbeke
2nd Neerpelt
2nd Sint-Michielsgestel
3rd Overall Superprestige

2nd Gieten
2nd Gavere
3rd Hamme
3rd Hoogstraten

3rd Maldegem
3rd Mechelen
2009–2010
Gazet van Antwerpen

1st Oostmalle

1st Eeklo
3rd Maldegem
3rd Zonnebeke
2010–2011
1st Cauberg
2nd National Championships
UCI World Cup

3rd Heusden-Zolder

Superprestige

3rd Middelkerke

Fidea Classics

3rd Niel

2011–2012
Gazet van Antwerpen

1st Essen
3rd Baal

1st Issaquah
1st Redmond
1st Sun Prairie II
2nd Kalmthout
2nd Sun Prairie I
2012–2013
1st Maldegem
2nd Otegem
2nd Woerden
Superprestige

3rd Gavere

2013–2014
3rd National Championships
