= Niels Albert =

Belgian cyclo-crosser (born 1986)

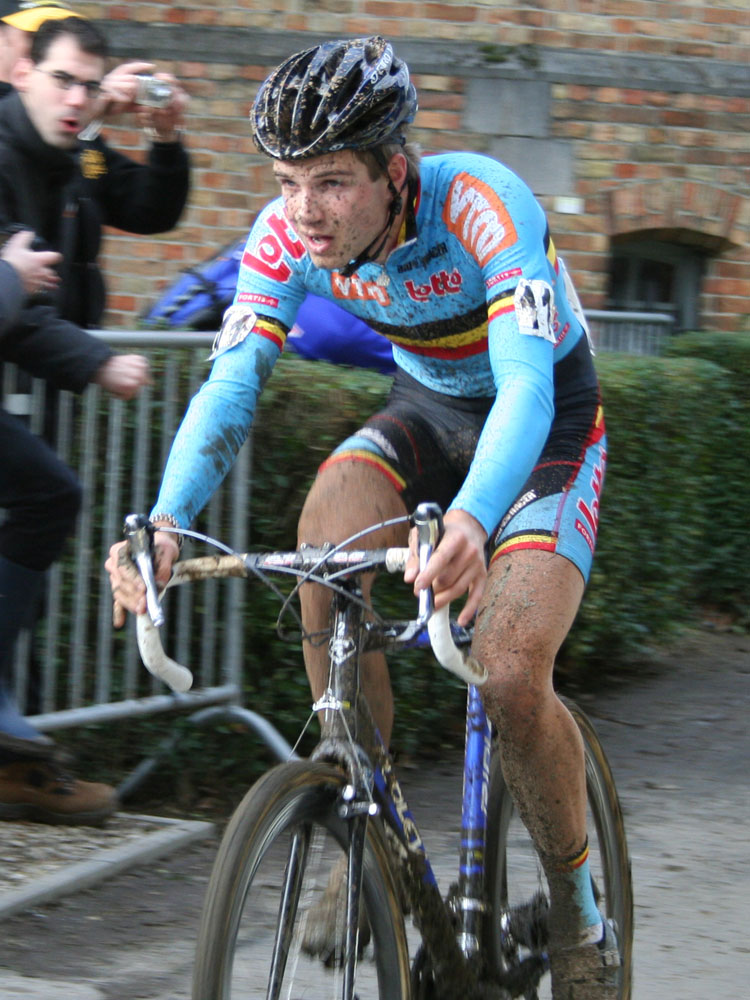
- Albert during the 2007 World Championships

Personal information
- Full name: Niels Albert
- Born: 5 February 1986 (age 40) Bonheiden, Belgium
- Height: 1.82 m (6 ft 0 in)
- Weight: 66 kg (146 lb; 10.4 st)

Cycling career
- Sport: Cycling
- Current team: Retired
- Disciplines: Cyclo-cross and road
- Role: Rider

Professional team
- 2005–2014: Palmans–Sapim–Collstrop

Major wins
- Cyclo-cross World Championships (2009, 2012) National Championships (2011) World Cup (2010–11, 2012–13) 11 individual wins (2008–09—2010–11, 2012–13, 2013–14) Trophy (2012–13)
Medal record
Representing Belgium
Men's cyclo-cross
World Championships
Gold medal – first place	Hoogerheide 2009	Elite
Gold medal – first place	Koksijde 2012	Elite

Niels Albert (born 5 February 1986 in Bonheiden, near Antwerp, Belgium) is a former professional cyclo-cross racing cyclist who currently resides in Tremelo. He became World Champion twice, in 2009 and 2012.

== Career ==
Similarly to Sven Nys, Albert began BMX racing, in which he was two times Belgian National Champion, before switching to cyclo-cross. On 8 October 2006 Albert took his first major senior victory at Grote Prijs Pro Cycling Neerpelt, Belgium. Albert won the first International cyclo-cross of the 2007/08 season with a victory in Erpe-Mere, Belgium. Albert scored another big victory with the Superprestige in Gieten, the Netherlands where riding for the first time in the Elite category of the annual Gieten race, he beat Sven Nys and Lars Boom.

He finished second at the 2008/09 Belgian Cyclo-cross Championships (behind Sven Nys).

In 2009, he became the Cyclo-cross world champion in Hoogerheide, The Netherlands. He took a second World Champion title in 2012, after a solo victory in Koksijde.

His career ended abruptly on 19 May 2014, when Albert, aged 28, announced his retirement as a professional cyclist, due to heart problems.

== Major results ==
=== Road ===
2007
3rd Overall Boucles de la Mayenne
2009
1st Stage 1 Mi-Août Bretonne
1st Prologue Boucles de la Mayenne
4th Overall Tour Alsace

1st Stages 2 & 5

2010
5th Overall Circuito Montañes

1st Stage 6

2011
1st Stage 2 Tour Alsace
7th Overall Boucles de la Mayenne
2013
8th Ronde van Limburg

=== Cyclo-cross ===
2003–2004
1st UCI World Junior Championships
1st UEC European Junior Championships
1st National Junior Championships
1st Overall Junior Superprestige

1st Ruddervorde
1st Gieten
1st Diegem
1st Hoogstraten
1st Harnes
1st Vorselaar
2nd Gavere

2004–2005
1st Overall Under-23 Superprestige

1st Gavere
1st Gieten
1st Hoogstraten
1st Vorselaar
2nd Sint-Michielsgestel
3rd Ruddervorde
3rd Diegem

UCI Under-23 World Cup

1st Hofstade

1st Under-23 Kalmthout
1st Under-23 Beuvry
1st Under-23 Leudelange
2nd UEC European Under-23 Championships
2nd National Under-23 Championships
3rd Zonnebeke
2005–2006
1st UEC European Under-23 Championships
1st National Under-23 Championships
1st Overall Under-23 Superprestige

1st Ruddervorde
1st Sint-Michielsgestel
1st Gavere
1st Gieten
1st Diegem
1st Hoogstraten
1st Vorselaar

1st Overall Under-23 Gazet van Antwerpen

1st Koppenberg
1st Loenhout
1st Lille

UCI Under-23 World Cup

1st Kalmthout

Gazet van Antwerpen

2nd Niel
3rd Baal

1st Under-23 Pijnacker
2nd Aalter
2nd Antwerpen
2nd Dottenijs
2nd Eeklo
3rd UCI World Under-23 Championships
2006–2007
1st UEC European Under-23 Championships
1st National Under-23 Championships
1st Overall UCI Under-23 World Cup

1st Kalmthout
1st Hofstade
1st Nommay
2nd Hoogerheide

1st Overall Under-23 Superprestige

1st Sint-Michielsgestel
1st Gavere
1st Gieten
1st Hamme
1st Diegem
1st Hoogstraten
1st Vorselaar
2nd Ruddervorde

2nd Overall Gazet van Antwerpen

1st Oostmalle
1st Loenhout
3rd Baal

1st Antwerpen
1st Neerpelt
2nd UCI World Under-23 Championships
2nd Eeklo
2nd Vossem
2nd Mechelen
3rd Overijse
3rd Aalter
2007–2008
1st UCI World Under-23 Championships
1st UEC European Under-23 Championships
1st Overall UCI Under-23 World Cup

1st Kalmthout
1st Hofstade
1st Liévin
1st Hoogerheide

3rd Overall Superprestige

1st Gieten
1st Hoogstraten
1st Vorselaar
2nd Veghel-Eerde

Gazet van Antwerpen

1st Lille
1st Oostmalle
3rd Loenhout
3rd Hasselt

1st Ardooie
1st Erpe-Mere
2nd Neerpelt
2nd Lebbeke
2nd Mechelen
3rd National Championships
3rd Eeklo
2008–2009
1st UCI World Championships
UCI World Cup

1st Tábor
2nd Kalmthout
2nd Pijnacker

Superprestige

1st Veghel-Eerde
2nd Vorselaar
2nd Hoogstraten
3rd Ruddervorde

Gazet van Antwerpen

1st Lille
2nd Oostmalle
2nd Niel
3rd Koppenberg
3rd Baal

1st Erpe-Mere
1st Zonhoven
1st Ardooie
1st Eeklo
1st Mechelen
1st Tervuren
2nd National Championships
3rd Dottenijs
2009–2010
2nd Overall UCI World Cup

1st Treviso
1st Plzeň
1st Nommay
1st Hoogerheide
2nd Igorre
2nd Heusden-Zolder
3rd Kalmthout

2nd Overall Superprestige

1st Diegem
1st Hoogstraten
1st Gavere
2nd Ruddervorde
2nd Vorselaar
3rd Gieten

3rd Overall Gazet van Antwerpen

1st Namur
1st Essen
2nd Loenhout
2nd Koppenberg
3rd Baal
3rd Hasselt

1st Ardooie
1st Erpe-Mere
1st Maldegem
1st Neerpelt
1st Overijse
1st Dottenijs
1st Eernegem
2nd Mechelen
3rd Bredene
2010–2011
1st National Championships
1st Overall UCI World Cup

1st Koksijde
1st Igorre
1st Hoogerheide
2nd Heusden-Zolder
2nd Aigle
2nd Pontchâteau
3rd Plzeň

Superprestige

1st Diegem
2nd Hoogstraten
3rd Hamme
3rd Gavere

Gazet van Antwerpen

1st Loenhout
1st Oostmalle
2nd Koppenberg
3rd Baal

Fidea Classics

1st Tervuren
2nd Niel

3rd Asteasu
3rd Bredene
3rd Cauberg
3rd Mechelen
2011–2012
1st UCI World Championships
Superprestige

1st Ruddervorde
1st Zonhoven
1st Diegem

Gazet van Antwerpen

1st Loenhout
1st Oostmalle
2nd Essen
3rd Ronse

1st Kalmthout
1st Dottenijs
1st Mechelen
UCI World Cup

2nd Namur

Fidea Classics

2nd Niel
3rd Neerpelt

2nd National Championships
3rd Cauberg
2012–2013
1st Overall UCI World Cup

1st Plzeň
2nd Rome
2nd Heusden-Zolder
2nd Koksijde
3rd Namur
3rd Tábor
3rd Roubaix

1st Overall Bpost Bank Trophy

1st Oostmalle
1st Lille
1st Loenhout
1st Ronse
2nd Koppenberg
2nd Hasselt
3rd Baal
3rd Essen

2nd Overall Superprestige

1st Diegem
2nd Hamme
2nd Zonhoven
2nd Middelkerke
2nd Ruddervorde

Soudal Classics

1st Leuven
1st Niel
2nd Neerpelt
3rd Antwerpen

1st Dottenijs
1st Heerlen
1st Cincinnati
2nd National Championships
2nd Bredene
2nd Kalmthout
2nd Overijse
2nd Sint-Niklaas
2nd Mechelen
3rd Ardooie
3rd Maldegem
2013–2014
2nd Overall Superprestige

1st Hamme
1st Gieten
2nd Zonhoven
3rd Diegem
3rd Hoogstraten

2nd Overall Bpost Bank Trophy

1st Oostmalle
2nd Hasselt
3rd Baal
3rd Loenhout
3rd Essen
3rd Ronse

3rd Overall UCI World Cup

1st Koksijde
1st Rome
3rd Namur

Soudal Classics

1st Neerpelt
1st Antwerpen

1st Sint-Niklaas
1st Erpe-Mere
2nd Ardooie
2nd Dottenijs
3rd Maldegem
3rd Mechelen

== See also ==
- Niels Albert CX
