= Cyclo-cross Boom =

- 2024 logo

Race details
- Date: October
- Region: Boom, Belgium, Belgium
- Discipline: Cyclo-cross
- Competition: Superprestige
- Web site: www.nielsalbertcx.be

History
- First edition: 2015
- Editions: 9 (as of 2023)
- First winner: Lars Van der Haar (NED)
- Most wins: Wout Van Aert (BEL) (3 wins)
- Most recent: Joris Nieuwenhuis (NED)

The Cyclo-cross Boom is a cyclo-cross race in Boom, Belgium. Established in 2015, it is also called Niels Albert CX after two-time World Champion Niels Albert who retired early from the sport in 2014, aged 28 due to heart problems. Held in October, in the 2017-2018 season it became part of the Superprestige.

== Winners ==
=== Male ===
Year	Winner	Second	Third
2023	Joris Nieuwenhuis (NED)	Cameron Mason (GBR)	Eli Iserbyt (BEL)
2022	Tom Pidcock (GBR)	Lars Van der Haar (NED)	Eli Iserbyt (BEL)
2021	Wout van Aert (BEL)	Toon Aerts (BEL)	Lars Van der Haar (NED)
2020	Eli Iserbyt (BEL)	Michael Vanthourenhout (BEL)	Toon Aerts (BEL)
2019	Toon Aerts (BEL)	Quinten Hermans (BEL)	Tom Pidcock (GBR)
2018	Mathieu van der Poel (NED)	Toon Aerts (BEL)	Gianni Vermeersch (BEL)
2017	Wout van Aert (BEL)	Laurens Sweeck (BEL)	Lars Van der Haar (NED)
2016	Wout van Aert (BEL)	Mathieu van der Poel (NED)	Wietse Bosmans (BEL)
2015	Lars Van der Haar (NED)	Wout van Aert (BEL)	Sven Nys (BEL)

=== Women ===
Year	Winner	Second	Third
2023	Fem van Empel (NED)	Puck Pieterse (NED)	Annemarie Worst (NED)
2022	Aniek van Alphen (NED)	Denise Betsema (NED)	Shirin van Anrooij (NED)
2021	Lucinda Brand (NED)	Inge van der Heijden (NED)	Denise Betsema (NED)
2020	Lucinda Brand (NED)	Ceylin del Carmen Alvarado (NED)	Denise Betsema (NED)
2019	Alice Maria Arzuffi (ITA)	Eva Lechner (ITA)	Sanne Cant (BEL)
2018	Kim Van de Steene (BEL)	Alice Maria Arzuffi (ITA)	Sanne Cant (BEL)
2017	Maud Kaptheijns (NED)	Sanne Cant (BEL)	Annemarie Worst (NED)
2016	Jolien Verschueren (BEL)	Ellen Van Loy (BEL)	Rebecca Fahringer (USA)
2015	Ellen Van Loy (BEL)	Maud Kaptheijns (NED)	Loes Sels (BEL)
