= Peter Van Den Abeele =

Belgian cyclist (born 1966)

Personal information
- Born: 1 May 1966 (age 60) Ghent, Belgium

Cycling career
- Sport: Cycling

Peter Van Den Abeele (born 1 May 1966) is a Belgian cyclist. He competed at the 1996 Summer Olympics and the 2000 Summer Olympics.
