= 2018–19 Cyclo-cross Superprestige =

Details
- Location: Belgium & Netherlands
- Races: 8

Champions
- Male individual champion: Mathieu van der Poel (NED) (Corendon–Circus)
- Female individual champion: Sanne Cant (BEL) (Corendon–Circus)

The 2018–19 Cyclo-cross Superprestige – also known as the Telenet Superprestige for sponsorship reasons – is a season long cyclo-cross competition held in Belgium and the Netherlands.

== Calendar ==
=== Men's competition ===
Date	Race	Winner	Team	Competition leader
14 October	Gieten	Mathieu van der Poel (NED)	Corendon–Circus	Mathieu van der Poel (NED)
20 October	Cyclo-cross Boom	Mathieu van der Poel (NED)	Corendon–Circus	Mathieu van der Poel (NED)
28 October	Ruddervoorde	Mathieu van der Poel (NED)	Corendon–Circus	Mathieu van der Poel (NED)
11 November	Gavere	Mathieu van der Poel (NED)	Corendon–Circus	Mathieu van der Poel (NED)
12 December	Zonhoven	Mathieu van der Poel (NED)	Corendon–Circus	Mathieu van der Poel (NED)
30 December	Diegem	Mathieu van der Poel (NED)	Corendon–Circus	Mathieu van der Poel (NED)
10 February	Hoogstraten	Mathieu van der Poel (NED)	Corendon–Circus	Mathieu van der Poel (NED)
16 February	Middelkerke	Mathieu van der Poel (NED)	Corendon–Circus	Mathieu van der Poel (NED)

=== Women's competition ===
Date	Race	Winner	Team	Competition leader
14 October	Gieten	Annemarie Worst (NED)	Steylaerts-777	Annemarie Worst (NED)
20 October	Cyclo-cross Boom	Kim van de Steene (BEL)	Tarteletto–Isorex	Annemarie Worst (NED)
28 October	Ruddervoorde	Marianne Vos (NED)	WaowDeals Pro Cycling	Annemarie Worst (NED)
11 November	Gavere	Alice Maria Arzuffi (ITA)	Steylaerts-777	Annemarie Worst (NED)
12 December	Zonhoven	Sanne Cant (BEL)	Corendon–Circus	Alice Maria Arzuffi (ITA)
30 December	Diegem	Sanne Cant (BEL)	Corendon–Circus	Sanne Cant (BEL)
10 February	Hoogstraten	Sanne Cant (BEL)	Corendon–Circus	Sanne Cant (BEL)
16 February	Middelkerke	Denise Betsema (NED)	Marlux–Bingoal	Sanne Cant (BEL)
