= Pauwels Sauzen–Bingoal =

Belgian cycling team

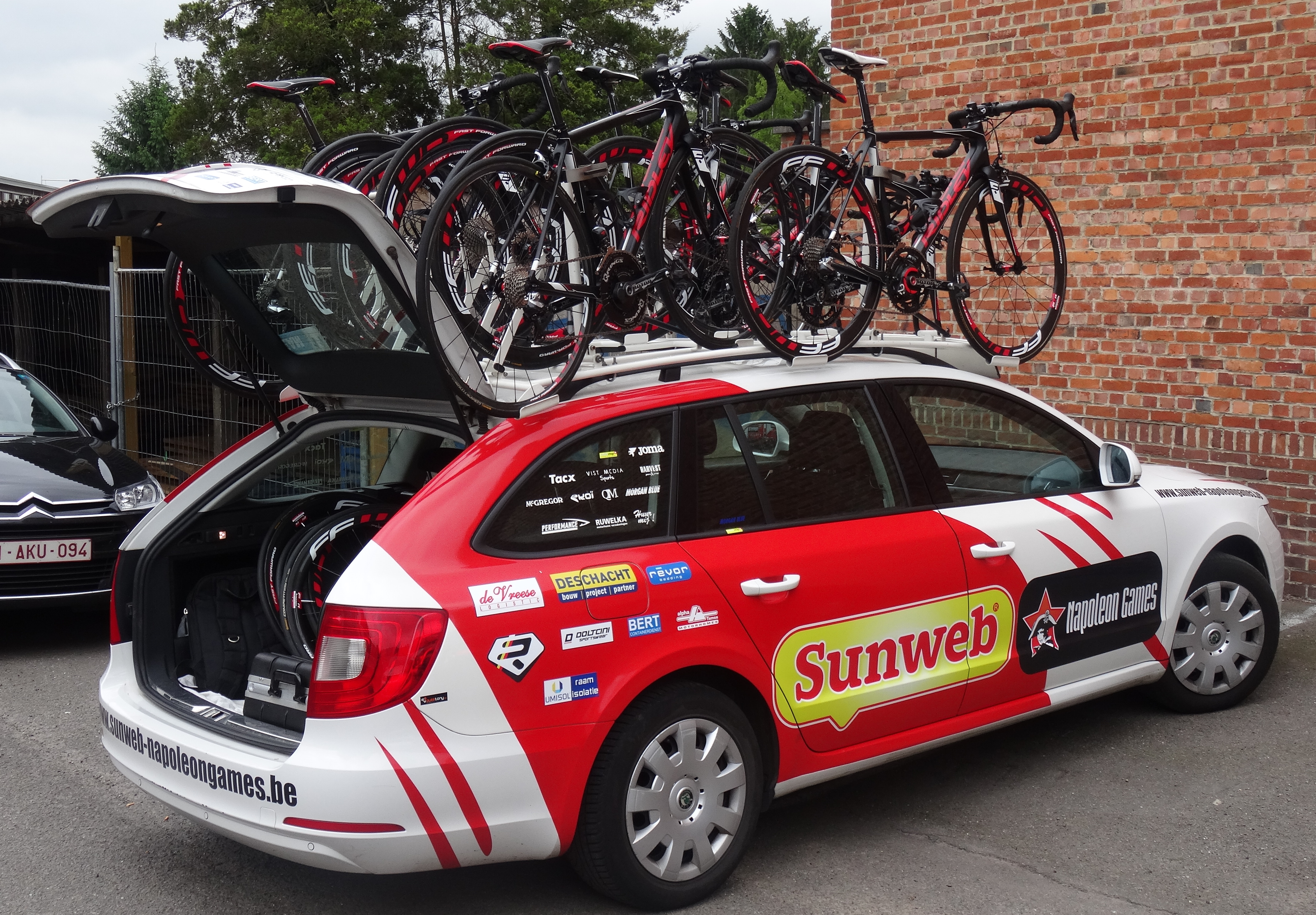

Team information
- UCI code: PSB
- Registered: Belgium
- Founded: 2007
- Disciplines: Road; Cyclo-cross
- Status: Continental

Key personnel
- General manager: Jurgen Mettepenningen

Team name history
- 2007–2009 2010–2012 2013–2015 2016–2017 2018 2019–: Sunweb–Projob; Sunweb–Revor; Sunweb–Napoleon Games; Marlux–Napoleon Games; Marlux–Bingoal; Pauwels Sauzen–Bingoal
Pauwels Sauzen–Bingoal jersey
Jersey

Pauwels Sauzen–Bingoal (UCI Code: PSB) is a UCI continental cycling team that is based in Belgium and races predominantly the cyclo-cross season. The team is named after its main sponsors Pauwels Sauzen, a condiment brand, and Bingoal, a Belgian sports betting website.

== Team roster ==
As of 23 April 2020.

Rider	Date of birth
Denise Betsema (NED)	23 January 1993 (age 33)
Jelle Camps (BEL)	5 April 1999 (age 27)
Anton Ferdinande (BEL)	2 August 2000 (age 26)
Ryan Kamp (NED)	12 December 2000 (age 25)
Tomáš Kopecký (CZE)	8 April 2000 (age 26)
Witse Meeussen (BEL)	8 March 2001 (age 25)

Rider	Date of birth
Pim Ronhaar (NED)	20 July 2001 (age 25)
Laurens Sweeck (BEL)	17 December 1993 (age 32)
Toon Vandebosch (BEL)	19 June 1999 (age 27)
Dieter Vanthourenhout (BEL)	20 June 1985 (age 41)
Michael Vanthourenhout (BEL)	10 December 1993 (age 32)
Luke Verburg (NED)	12 May 2001 (age 25)

== Major victories ==
=== Men ===
==== Cyclo-cross ====
2008–2009
Superprestige Gieten, Klaas Vantornout
2011–2012
Overall UCI Cyclo-cross World Cup, Kevin Pauwels

Tábor, Kevin Pauwels
Igorre, Kevin Pauwels
Heusden-Zolder, Kevin Pauwels
Hoogerheide, Kevin Pauwels

Overall Gazet van Antwerpen Trophy, Kevin Pauwels

+ 3 round victories, Kevin Pauwels

Cyclo-cross Gavere, Kevin Pauwels
UCI Cyclo-cross season ranking, Kevin Pauwels
2012–2013
Tábor, Kevin Pauwels
Namur, Kevin Pauwels
Rome, Kevin Pauwels
Superprestige Gieten, Klaas Vantornout
Middelkerke, Klaas Vantornout
Belgian National Cyclo-cross Championships, Klaas Vantornout
2013–2014
Cyclo-cross Ruddervoorde, Klaas Vantornout
2014–2015
Superprestige Gavere, Klaas Vantornout
Superprestige Zonhoven, Kevin Pauwels
Superprestige Spa-Francorchamps, Kevin Pauwels
UCI Cyclo-cross World Cup Milton Keynes, Kevin Pauwels
U23 World Cyclo-cross Championships, Michael Vanthourenhout

2021-22
Rapencross, Eli Iserbyt
Beringen, Eli Iserbyt
Cyclocross Bredene, Eli Iserbyt
Berencross, Michael Vanthourenhout
Grand Prix Dohňany, Witse Meeussen
UCI Cyclo-cross World Cup Waterloo, Eli Iserbyt
UCI Cyclo-cross World Cup Iowa City, Eli Iserbyt
Kermiscross, Laurens Sweeck
UCI Cyclo-cross World Cup Overijse, Eli Iserbyt
X²O Badkamers Trophy Koppenbergcross, Eli Iserbyt
Cyclo-cross Superprestige Jaarmarktcross , Eli Iserbyt
GP Leuven, Laurens Sweeck
Cyclo-cross Superprestige Merksplas, Eli Iserbyt
UCI Cyclo-cross World Cup Koksijde, Eli Iserbyt
UCI Cyclo-cross World Cup Besançon, Eli Iserbyt
UCI Cyclo-cross World Cup Namur, Michael Vanthourenhout

2022-23
Poldercross, Michael Vanthourenhout
Beringen, Eli Iserbyt
Berencross, Michael Vanthourenhout
UCI Cyclo-cross World Cup Waterloo, Eli Iserbyt
UCI Cyclo-cross World Cup Fayetteville, Eli Iserbyt
UCI Cyclo-cross World Cup Tábor, Eli Iserbyt
Cyclo-cross Superprestige Ruddervoorde, Eli Iserbyt

=== Road cycling ===
2010
Stage 1 Tour of Małopolska, Martin Zlámalík
2011
Stage 3 Kreiz Breizh Elites, Kevin Pauwels
Stage 1 Tour of Małopolska, Tijmen Eising
Stages 1 & 3 Carpathia Couriers Tour, Tijmen Eising

=== Women ===
==== Cyclo-cross ====
2021-22
Rapencross, Denise Betsema
Cyclocross Bredene, Denise Betsema
Cyclo-cross Superprestige Ruddervoorde, Denise Betsema
UCI Cyclo-cross World Cup Zonhoven, Denise Betsema
UCI Cyclo-cross World Cup Val di Sole, Denise Betsema

2022-23
Poldercross, Fem van Empel
Beringen, Fem van Empel
UCI Cyclo-cross World Cup Waterloo, Fem van Empel
UCI Cyclo-cross World Cup Fayetteville, Fem van Empel
UCI Cyclo-cross World Cup Tábor, Fem van Empel
Cyclo-cross Superprestige Ruddervoorde, Denise Betsema
UCI Cyclo-cross World Cup Maasmechelen, Fem van Empel
Koppenbergcross, Fem van Empel

2025-26
Cyclo-cross Superprestige Gullegem, Amandine Fouquenet
