= Koppenbergcross =

Cyclo-cross race in Belgium

Grote Prijs Koppenbergcross Oudenaarde

Race details
- Date: November
- Region: Oudenaarde, Belgium
- Local name: Koppenbergcross
- Discipline: Cyclo-cross
- Competition: Cyclo-cross Trophy
- Type: one-day
- Organiser: A.S.B.L. Sint-Pieters Vrienden Oudenaarde
- Race director: André Delepeleire
- Web site: koppenbergcross.be

Men's History
- First edition: 1988
- Editions: 37 (as of 2026)
- First winner: Rudy Thielemans (BEL)
- Most wins: Sven Nys (BEL) (9 wins)
- Most recent: Thibau Nys (BEL)

Women's History
- First edition: 2002
- Editions: 22 (as of 2026)
- First winner: Laurence Leboucher (FRA)
- Most wins: Helen Wyman (GBR) (4 wins)
- Most recent: Lucinda Brand (NED)

The Cyclo-cross Koppenberg is a cyclo-cross race held since 1988 in Oudenaarde, Belgium, and is part of the Cyclo-cross Trophy. The cyclo-cross race uses the Koppenberg climb that has been used many times in the Belgian Classic the Tour of Flanders. This is a very steep and cobbled climb that is part of the course of which the riders do eight laps. Fifteen thousand spectators were reported to have watched the 2006 edition of the event which was won by Belgian Sven Nys.

In the 2021 the women edition was renamed the G.P. Jolien Verschueren.

== Past winners ==
=== Men ===
| Year | Country | Rider | Team |
|---|---|---|---|
| 1988 | Belgium | Rudy Thielemans | |
| 1989 | Belgium | Rudy Thielemans | |
| 1990 | Belgium | Chris David | |
| 1991 | Belgium | Peter Van Den Abeele | |
| 1992 | Czechoslovakia | Pavel Camrda | |
| 1993; 1995 | No race | | |
| 1996 | Belgium | Mario Lammens | |
| 1997 | Belgium | Peter Van Den Abeele | |
| 1998 | Belgium | Bart Wellens | |
| 1999 | Belgium | Peter Van Den Abeele | |
| 1999 | Belgium | Mario De Clercq | Palmans–Ideal |
| 2000 | Belgium | Mario De Clercq | Palmans–Ideal |
| 2001 | Belgium | Sven Nys | Rabobank |
| 2002 | Netherlands | Richard Groenendaal | Rabobank |
| 2003 | Belgium | Bart Wellens | Spaarselect |
| 2004 | Belgium | Sven Nys | Rabobank |
| 2005 | Belgium | Sven Nys | Rabobank |
| 2006 | Belgium | Sven Nys | Rabobank |
| 2007 | Belgium | Sven Nys | Rabobank |
| 2008 | Belgium | Sven Nys | Landbouwkrediet–Tönissteiner |
| 2009 | Belgium | Sven Nys | Landbouwkrediet–Colnago |
| 2010 | Belgium | Sven Nys | Landbouwkrediet |
| 2011 | Belgium | Kevin Pauwels | Sunweb-Revor |
| 2012 | Belgium | Sven Nys | Landbouwkrediet–Euphony |
| 2013 | Belgium | Tom Meeusen | Telenet–Fidea |
| 2014 | Belgium | Wout van Aert | Vastgoedservice – Golden Palace |
| 2015 | Belgium | Wout van Aert | Vastgoedservice – Golden Palace |
| 2016 | Belgium | Wout van Aert | Vastgoedservice – Golden Palace |
| 2017 | Netherlands | Mathieu van der Poel | Beobank–Corendon |
| 2018 | Belgium | Toon Aerts | Telenet–Fidea Lions |
| 2019 | Belgium | Eli Iserbyt | Pauwels Sauzen–Vastgoedservice |
| 2020 | Belgium | Eli Iserbyt | Pauwels Sauzen–Bingoal |
| 2021 | Belgium | Eli Iserbyt | Pauwels Sauzen–Bingoal |
| 2022 | Netherlands | Lars van der Haar | Baloise–Trek Lions |
| 2023 | Belgium | Thibau Nys | Baloise–Trek Lions |
| 2024 | Netherlands | Lars van der Haar | Baloise–Trek Lions |
| 2025 | Belgium | Thibau Nys | Baloise Glowi Lions |
| 2026 | Belgium | Thibau Nys | Baloise Verzekeringen–Het Poetsbureau Lions |

=== Women ===
| Year | Country | Rider | Team |
|---|---|---|---|
| 2002 | France | Laurence Leboucher | |
| 2003; 2004 | No race | | |
| 2005 | Netherlands | Daphny van den Brand | |
| 2006 | Netherlands | Marianne Vos | |
| 2007 | Netherlands | Daphny van den Brand | |
| 2008 | No race | | |
| 2009 | Czech Republic | Pavla Havlikova | |
| 2010 | Great Britain | Helen Wyman | |
| 2011 | Netherlands | Sanne Van Paassen | |
| 2012 | Great Britain | Helen Wyman | |
| 2013 | Great Britain | Helen Wyman | |
| 2014 | Netherlands | Sophie de Boer | |
| 2015 | Belgium | Jolien Verschueren | |
| 2016 | Belgium | Jolien Verschueren | |
| 2017 | Great Britain | Helen Wyman | |
| 2018 | Belgium | Kim Van de Steene | Tartelleto |
| 2019 | Netherlands | Yara Kastelijn | 777 |
| 2020 | Netherlands | Annemarie Worst | 777 |
| 2021 | United States | Clara Honsinger | Cannondale–Cyclocrossworld.com |
| 2022 | Netherlands | Fem van Empel | Pauwels Sauzen–Bingoal |
| 2023 | Netherlands | Fem van Empel | Team Jumbo–Visma |
| 2024 | Netherlands | Fem van Empel | Visma–Lease a Bike |
| 2025 | Netherlands | Lucinda Brand | Baloise Glowi Lions |
| 2026 | Netherlands | Lucinda Brand | Baloise Verzekeringen–Het Poetsbureau Lions |
