= Cyclo-cross Ruddervoorde =

Belgian cycling race

Cyclocross Ruddervoorde
- 2024 logo

Race details
- Region: Ruddervoorde, Belgium
- Discipline: Cyclo-cross
- Competition: Superprestige

History
- First edition: 1988
- Editions: 37 (as of 2025)
- First winner: Chris David (BEL)
- Most wins: Sven Nys (BEL) (10 wins)
- Most recent: Michael Vanthourenhout (BEL)

History (women)
- First winner: Helen Wyman (GBR)
- Most wins: Ceylin del Carmen Alvarado (NED) (4 wins)
- Most recent: Marion Norbert-Riberolle (BEL)

The Cyclo-cross Ruddervoorde is a cyclo-cross race held in Ruddervoorde, Belgium, which is part of the Superprestige.

== Past winners ==
=== Men ===
Year	Country	Rider	Team
1988	Belgium	Chris David	
1989	Belgium	Chris David	
1990	No race		
1991	Belgium	Johnny Blomme	
1992	Belgium	Johnny Blomme	
1993	Belgium	Pascal Van Riet	
1994	Belgium	Filip Van Luchem	
1995	Belgium	Paul Herygers	
1996	Belgium	Erwin Vervecken	
1997	Belgium	Sven Nys	
1998	Belgium	Danny De Bie	Rolini Sportswear
1998	Belgium	Sven Nys	Rabobank
1999	Belgium	Sven Nys	Rabobank
2000	Netherlands	Richard Groenendaal	Rabobank
2001	Belgium	Bart Wellens	Spaarselect
2002	Belgium	Sven Nys	Rabobank
2003	Belgium	Bart Wellens	Spaarselect
2004	Belgium	Sven Nys	Rabobank
2005	Belgium	Bart Wellens	Fidea Cycling Team
2006	Belgium	Sven Nys	Rabobank
2007	Belgium	Sven Nys	Rabobank
2008	Belgium	Sven Nys	Landbouwkrediet–Tönissteiner
2009	Belgium	Sven Nys	Landbouwkrediet–Colnago
2010	Czech Republic	Zdeněk Štybar	Telenet–Fidea
2011	Belgium	Niels Albert	BKCP–Powerplus
2012	Belgium	Sven Nys	Landbouwkrediet–Euphony
2013	Belgium	Klaas Vantornout	Sunweb–Napoleon Games
2014	Belgium	Tom Meeusen	Telenet–Fidea
2015	Belgium	Kevin Pauwels	Sunweb–Napoleon Games
2016	Netherlands	Mathieu van der Poel	Beobank–Corendon
2017	Netherlands	Mathieu van der Poel	Beobank–Corendon
2018	Netherlands	Mathieu van der Poel	Corendon–Circus
2019	Netherlands	Mathieu van der Poel	Corendon–Circus
2020	Belgium	Eli Iserbyt	Pauwels Sauzen–Bingoal
2021	Belgium	Eli Iserbyt	Pauwels Sauzen–Bingoal
2022	Belgium	Eli Iserbyt	Pauwels Sauzen–Bingoal
2023	Belgium	Eli Iserbyt	Pauwels Sauzen–Bingoal
2024	Belgium	Joran Wyseure	Crelan-Corendon
2025	Belgium	Michael Vanthourenhout	Pauwels Sauzen–Cibel Clementines

=== Women ===
Year	Country	Rider	Team
2011	Great Britain	Helen Wyman	
2012	Great Britain	Nikki Harris	
2013	Great Britain	Helen Wyman	
2014	Belgium	Sanne Cant	
2015	Belgium	Sanne Cant	
2016	Netherlands	Sophie de Boer	
2017	Netherlands	Maud Kaptheijns	
2018	Netherlands	Marianne Vos	
2019	Netherlands	Ceylin del Carmen Alvarado	Corendon–Circus
2020	Netherlands	Ceylin del Carmen Alvarado	Alpecin–Fenix
2021	Netherlands	Denise Betsema	Pauwels Sauzen–Bingoal
2022	Netherlands	Denise Betsema	Pauwels Sauzen–Bingoal
2023	Netherlands	Ceylin del Carmen Alvarado	Alpecin–Deceuninck
2024	Netherlands	Ceylin del Carmen Alvarado	Alpecin–Deceuninck
2025	Belgium	Marion Norbert-Riberolle	Crelan-Corendon
