= Vlaamse Aardbeiencross =

Race held in Belgium

- Poster to the 2024 edition

Race details
- Date: February
- Region: Hoogstraten, Belgium (1997-2019); Merksplas, Belgium (2020-)
- English name: Flemish Strawberrycross
- Discipline: Cyclo-cross
- Competition: Superprestige
- Web site: www.cyclocrosshoogstraten.be

History (men)
- First edition: 1987
- Editions: 38 (as of 2026)
- First winner: Wim Lambrechts (BEL)
- Most wins: Sven Nys (BEL) (8 wins)
- Most recent: Niels Vandeputte (BEL)

History (women)
- First edition: 2012
- Editions: 15 (as of 2026)
- First winner: Daphny van den Brand (NED)
- Most wins: Sanne Cant (BEL) (5 wins)
- Most recent: Lucinda Brand (NED)

The Vlaamse Aardbeiencross is a cyclo-cross race held in Belgium since 1987. It was held in Hoogstraten between 1987 and 2020. It became part of the Superprestige in the 1998–1999 season. In 2020 the race moved to Merksplas due to locations problems with the site in Hoogstraten, but the February race was annulled due to storm Ciara. Since 2020 the race has been held in Merksplas in the month November.

== Past winners ==
=== Men ===
Year	Winner
2026	(Belgium) Niels Vandeputte
2025	(Netherlands) Joris Nieuwenhuis
2024	(Belgium) Laurens Sweeck
2023	(Netherlands) Joris Nieuwenhuis
2022	(Belgium) Laurens Sweeck
2021	(Belgium) Eli Iserbyt
Nov. 2020	(Belgium) Michael Vanthourenhout
Feb. 2020	Cancelled due to storm Ciara
2019	(Netherlands) Mathieu van der Poel
2018	(Netherlands) Mathieu van der Poel
2017	(Netherlands) Mathieu van der Poel
2016	(Netherlands) Mathieu van der Poel
2015	(Netherlands) Mathieu van der Poel
2014	(Belgium) Sven Nys
2013	(Belgium) Sven Nys
2012	(Belgium) Tom Meeusen
2011	(Belgium) Sven Nys
Nov. 2009	(Belgium) Niels Albert
Feb. 2009	(Belgium) Sven Nys
2008	(Belgium) Niels Albert
2007	(Belgium) Sven Nys
2006	(Belgium) Sven Nys
2005	(Belgium) Erwin Vervecken
2004	(Belgium) Erwin Vervecken
2003	(Belgium) Sven Nys
2001	(Belgium) Erwin Vervecken
2000	(Belgium) Mario De Clercq
1999	(Belgium) Sven Nys
1998	(Belgium) Bart Wellens
1997	(Belgium) Peter Willemsens
1996 (Note: In the 1996–1997 season, this race was held as the Belgian Championship.)	(Belgium) Paul Herygers
1995	(Belgium) Paul Herygers
1994	(Belgium) Peter Willemsens
1993	(Belgium) Paul Herygers
1992	(Belgium) Gustaaf Van Bouwel
1991	(Belgium) Dirk Pauwels
1991 (Note: This race was a time trial, held on the same day as the regular race.)	(Belgium) Pascal Van Riet
1990	(Belgium) Wim Lambrechts
1989	(Belgium) Kurt De Roose
1988	(Belgium) Wim Lambrechts
1987	(Belgium) Wim Lambrechts

=== Women ===
Year	Winner
2026	(Netherlands) Lucinda Brand
2025	(Netherlands) Lucinda Brand
2024	(Netherlands) Ceylin del Carmen Alvarado
2023	(Netherlands) Ceylin del Carmen Alvarado
2022	(Netherlands) Ceylin del Carmen Alvarado
2021	(Netherlands) Lucinda Brand
Nov. 2020	(Netherlands) Lucinda Brand
Feb. 2020	Cancelled due to strong winds
2019	(Belgium) Sanne Cant
2018	(Belgium) Sanne Cant
2017	(Netherlands) Sophie de Boer
2016	(Belgium) Sanne Cant
2015	(Belgium) Sanne Cant
2014	(United Kingdom) Nikki Harris
2013	(Belgium) Sanne Cant
2012	(Netherlands) Daphny van den Brand
