= Bollekescross =

Race details
- Region: Hamme, Belgium
- Discipline: Cyclo-cross
- Competition: Cyclo-cross Trophy
- Type: one-day

History (men)
- First edition: 2002
- Editions: 25 (as of November 2026)
- First winner: Sven Nys (BEL)
- Most wins: Sven Nys (BEL) (7 wins)
- Most recent: Thibau Nys (BEL)

History (women)
- First edition: 2007
- Editions: 17 (as of November 2026)
- First winner: Loes Sels (BEL)
- Most wins: Sanne Cant (BEL) (3 wins)
- Most recent: Lucinda Brand (NED)

The Bollekescross is a cyclo-cross race held since 2002 in Hamme, the settlement Zogge. After the 2013 rece, the rights to the cross were sold by founder Jurgen Mettepenningen to Golazo, who renamed it to Flandriencross in honour of Greg Van Avermaet who was raised in Hamme and is a multiple times winner of the Flandrien of the Year award. They also moved the race to a different course within Hamme. During 2004–2014 the cross was a part of the Superprestige. Since 2014 it has been a part of the Cyclo-cross Trophy. From 2026, the cross is again held in Zogge and renamed to Bollekescross, as Mettepenningen reacquired the rights.

Former Flandrien Cross logo

== Past winners ==
=== Men ===
Year	Country	Rider	Team
↓ Bollekescross ↓
2002	Belgium	Sven Nys	Rabobank
2003	Belgium	Mario De Clercq	Palmans–Collstrop–MrBookmaker.be
2004	Belgium	Sven Vanthourenhout	Quick-Step–Davitamon
2005	Belgium	Sven Nys	Rabobank
2006	Belgium	Sven Nys	Rabobank
2007	Belgium	Sven Nys	Rabobank
2008	Belgium	Sven Nys	Landbouwkrediet–Tönissteiner
2009	Czech Republic	Zdeněk Štybar	Telenet–Fidea
2010	Belgium	Sven Nys	Landbouwkrediet
2011	Czech Republic	Zdeněk Štybar	Quick-Step
2012	Belgium	Sven Nys	Landbouwkrediet–Euphony
2013	Belgium	Niels Albert	BKCP–Powerplus
↓ Flandriencross ↓
2014	Belgium	Wout van Aert	Vastgoedservice–Golden Palace
2015	Belgium	Wout van Aert	Vastgoedservice–Golden Palace
2016	Netherlands	Mathieu van der Poel	Beobank–Corendon
2017	Netherlands	Mathieu van der Poel	Beobank–Corendon
2018	Netherlands	Mathieu van der Poel	Corendon–Circus
2019	Netherlands	Mathieu van der Poel	Corendon–Circus
2021	Netherlands	Mathieu van der Poel	Alpecin–Fenix
2022	Belgium	Laurens Sweeck	Pauwels Sauzen–Bingoal
2023	Belgium	Wout van Aert	Team Jumbo–Visma
Jan. 2024	Netherlands	Mathieu van der Poel	Alpecin–Deceuninck
Nov. 2024	Belgium	Niels Vandeputte	Alpecin–Deceuninck Development Team
2025	Belgium	Thibau Nys	Baloise Glowi Lions
↓ Bollekescross ↓
2026	Belgium	Thibau Nys	Baloise Verzekeringen–Het Poetsbureau Lions

=== Women ===
Year	Country	Rider	Team
↓ Bollekescross ↓
2007	Belgium	Loes Sels	Vlaanderen–Capri Sonne–T Interim
2008; 2010	No race		
2011	Netherlands	Daphny van den Brand	
2012	Netherlands	Sanne van Paassen	Rabobank Women Team
2013	Great Britain	Nikki Harris	Telenet–Fidea
↓ Flandriencross ↓
2014	Belgium	Sanne Cant	Enertherm–BKCP
2015	Great Britain	Helen Wyman	Kona Factory Team
2016	Belgium	Sanne Cant	Enertherm–BKCP
2017	Belgium	Sanne Cant	Enertherm–BKCP
2018	Netherlands	Annemarie Worst	Steylaerts–777
2019	Netherlands	Annemarie Worst	Steylaerts–777
2021	Netherlands	Ceylin del Carmen Alvarado	Corendon–Circus
2022	Netherlands	Lucinda Brand	Baloise–Trek Lions
2023	Netherlands	Fem van Empel	Team Jumbo–Visma
Jan. 2024	Netherlands	Fem van Empel	Visma–Lease a Bike
Nov. 2024	Netherlands	Ceylin del Carmen Alvarado	Fenix–Deceuninck
2025	Netherlands	Lucinda Brand	Baloise Glowi Lions
↓ Bollekescross ↓
2026	Netherlands	Lucinda Brand	Baloise Verzekeringen–Het Poetsbureau Lions
