= Diegem Cross =

Cyclo-cross race held in Diegem, Belgium

Race details
- Date: December
- Region: Diegem, Belgium
- Local name: Diegem Cross
- Discipline: Cyclo-cross
- Competition: Superprestige
- Type: one-day
- Web site: www.diegemcross.be

History (men)
- First edition: 1975
- Editions: 49 (as of 2025)
- First winner: Albert Van Damme (BEL)
- Most wins: Roland Liboton (BEL) (8 wins)
- Most recent: Tibor Del Grosso (NED)

History (women)
- First edition: 2011
- Editions: 13 (as of 2025)
- First winner: Marianne Vos (NED)
- Most wins: Marianne Vos (NED); Sanne Cant (BEL); Puck Pieterse (NED); (3 wins)
- Most recent: Puck Pieterse (NED)

The Diegem Cross also known as Superprestige Diegem is a cyclo-cross race held in Diegem, Belgium. The race is part of the Superprestige series and is usually held in the last week of December before the New Year's day. The race is one of the few cyclo-cross races that is held in the evening hours under the artificial lighting.

== History ==
The event has been held since 1975. In 1982 the race was included in the first edition of the Superprestige series which it has continued to be part of ever since. Since 2011 women's race was added to the event. The race was held under artificial lightning for the first time in 2000 and has been every year since 2007.

In 2007, future road cycling world champion Peter Sagan won the junior cyclo-cross race in Diegem.

In 2023 and 2024 the celebrity cyclo-cross race Turbo Cross was organized in between the Elite Women's and Elite Men's races.

== Past winners ==
Year	Men's winner	Women's winner
2025	(Netherlands) Tibor Del Grosso	(Netherlands) Puck Pieterse
2024	(Belgium) Laurens Sweeck	(Netherlands) Lucinda Brand
2023	(Netherlands) Mathieu van der Poel	(Netherlands) Puck Pieterse
2022	(Belgium) Wout van Aert	(Netherlands) Puck Pieterse
2021	Cancelled due to COVID-19 pandemic	
2020	Cancelled due to COVID-19 pandemic	
2019	(Netherlands) Mathieu van der Poel	(Netherlands) Annemarie Worst
2018	(Netherlands) Mathieu van der Poel	(Belgium) Sanne Cant
2017	(Netherlands) Mathieu van der Poel	(Belgium) Sanne Cant
2016	(Netherlands) Mathieu van der Poel	(Netherlands) Marianne Vos
2015	(Netherlands) Mathieu van der Poel	(Belgium) Ellen Van Loy
2014	(Netherlands) Mathieu van der Poel	(Netherlands) Marianne Vos
2013	(Belgium) Sven Nys	(Belgium) Sanne Cant
2012	(Belgium) Niels Albert	(Czech Republic) Kateřina Nash
2011	(Belgium) Niels Albert	(Netherlands) Marianne Vos
2010	(Belgium) Niels Albert	
2009	(Belgium) Niels Albert	
2008	(Czech Republic) Zdeněk Štybar	
2007	(Belgium) Sven Nys	
2006	(Belgium) Sven Nys	
2005	(Netherlands) Gerben de Knegt	
2004	(Belgium) Erwin Vervecken	
2003	(Belgium) Bart Wellens	
2002	(Belgium) Mario De Clercq	
2001	(Belgium) Erwin Vervecken	
2000	(Belgium) Sven Nys	
1999	(Netherlands) Richard Groenendaal	
1998	(Belgium) Sven Nys	
1997	(Netherlands) Adrie van der Poel	
1996	(Italy) Daniele Pontoni	
1995	(Italy) Daniele Pontoni	
1994	(Netherlands) Adrie van der Poel	
1993	(Italy) Daniele Pontoni	
1992	(Belgium) Marc Janssens	
1991	(Belgium) Danny De Bie	
1990	(Belgium) Gustaaf Van Bouwel	
1989	(Belgium) Danny De Bie	
1988	(Belgium) Roland Liboton	
1987	(Belgium) Roland Liboton	
1986	(Belgium) Roland Liboton	
1985	(Belgium) Roland Liboton	
1984	(Belgium) Roland Liboton	
1983	(Belgium) Roland Liboton	
1982	(Belgium) Roland Liboton	
1981	(Belgium) Roger De Vlaeminck	
1980	(Belgium) Roland Liboton	
1979	(Belgium) Roger De Vlaeminck	
1978	(Netherlands) Reinier Groenendaal	
1977	(Belgium) Robert Vermeire	
1976	(Belgium) Albert Van Damme	
1975	(Belgium) Albert Van Damme	
