= 777 (cycling team) =

Seven Racing
Team information
- UCI code: SR7
- Registered: Belgium
- Founded: 2018
- Discipline: Cyclocross
- Status: UCI Continental (2019–)

Key personnel
- Team manager: Bart Wellens

Team name history
- 2017-2018 2018-2019 2019-2023 2023-2024 2024-: Steylaerts - Betfirst; Steylaerts–777; 777; Cyclocross Reds; Seven Racing
777 jersey
Jersey

Seven Racing is a professional cyclocross team which participates in elite races.

== Current team roster ==
Rider	Date of birth
Cameron Mason (GBR)	18 August 2000 (age 26)
Aniek van Alphen (NED)	1 February 1999 (age 27)
Annemarie Worst (NED)	19 December 1995 (age 30)
Guus Van Den Eijnden (NED)	3 October 2005 (age 20)
