= Cyclo-cross Gavere =

Belgian bike race

Race details
- Region: Gavere, Belgium
- Local name: Cyclocross Asper-Gavere
- Discipline: Cyclo-cross
- Competition: UCI Cyclo-cross World Cup
- Type: one-day

History (men)
- First edition: 1983
- Editions: 43 (as of 2024)
- First winner: Hennie Stamsnijder (NED)
- Most wins: Sven Nys (BEL) (9 wins)
- Most recent: Mathieu van der Poel (NED)

History (women)
- First edition: 2000
- Editions: 25 (as of 2024)
- First winner: Hanka Kupfernagel (GER)
- Most wins: Sanne Cant (BEL); (4 wins)
- Most recent: Fem van Empel (NED)

The Cyclo-cross Gavere also known as Cyclocross Asper-Gavere is a cyclo-cross race held in Gavere, Belgium. It is held on the banks of the river Scheldt in the vicinity of the Grenier castle. A cyclo-cross race on or near the current location had been organized since 1955 as a standalone race, but in 1983 the race was included in the first edition of the Superprestige series which it continued to be part of until 2022. Since 2023 the race has been part of the UCI Cyclo-cross World Cup.

The cross includes some steep climbs and descents (with elevations up to 80 meters) on a muddy forest ground.

== Past winners ==
| Year | Men's winner | Women's winner |
|---|---|---|
| 2024 | (Netherlands) Mathieu van der Poel | (Netherlands) Fem van Empel |
| 2023 | (Netherlands) Mathieu van der Poel | (Netherlands) Puck Pieterse |
| Dec. 2022 | (Netherlands) Mathieu van der Poel | (Netherlands) Shirin van Anrooij |
| Feb. 2022 | (Netherlands) Lars van der Haar | (Netherlands) Lucinda Brand |
| 2020 | (United Kingdom) Tom Pidcock | (Netherlands) Lucinda Brand |
| 2019 | (Belgium) Eli Iserbyt | (Netherlands) Yara Kastelijn |
| 2018 | (Netherlands) Mathieu van der Poel | (Italy) Alice Maria Arzuffi |
| 2017 | (Belgium) Wout Van Aert | (Belgium) Ellen Van Loy |
| 2016 | (Netherlands) Mathieu van der Poel | (Belgium) Sanne Cant |
| 2015 | (Belgium) Wout Van Aert | (Belgium) Sanne Cant |
| 2014 | (Belgium) Klaas Vantornout | (Belgium) Sanne Cant |
| 2013 | (Belgium) Sven Nys | (Belgium) Sanne Cant |
| 2012 | (Belgium) Sven Nys | (United Kingdom) Nikki Harris |
| 2011 | (Belgium) Kevin Pauwels | (Netherlands) Sanne Van Paassen |
| 2010 | (Belgium) Sven Nys | (Netherlands) Sanne Van Paassen |
| 2009 | (Belgium) Niels Albert | (United States) Katie Compton |
| 2008 | (Belgium) Sven Nys | (United States) Katie Compton |
| 2007 | (Belgium) Sven Nys | (United States) Katie Compton |
| 2006 | (Belgium) Sven Nys | (Belgium) Hilde Quintens |
| 2005 | (Belgium) Sven Nys | (Belgium) Hilde Quintens |
| 2004 | (Belgium) Sven Nys | (Belgium) Hilde Quintens |
| 2003 | (Belgium) Bart Wellens | (Belgium) Anja Nobus |
| 2002 | (Belgium) Bart Wellens | (Belgium) Anja Nobus |
| 2001 | (Belgium) Sven Nys | (Belgium) Anja Nobus |
| 2000 | (Belgium) Peter Van Santvliet | (Germany) Hanka Kupfernagel |
| 1999 | (Netherlands) Richard Groenendaal | not held |
| 1998 | (Belgium) Mario De Clercq | not held |
| 1997 | (Netherlands) Richard Groenendaal | not held |
| 1996 | (Netherlands) Richard Groenendaal | not held |
| 1995 | (Netherlands) Wim de Vos | not held |
| 1994 | (Italy) Daniele Pontoni | not held |
| Nov. 1993 | (Switzerland) Thomas Frischknecht | not held |
| Jan 1993 | (Italy) Daniele Pontoni | not held |
| 1992 | (Netherlands) Huub Kools | not held |
| 1991 | (Netherlands) Adrie van der Poel | not held |
| 1990 | (Belgium) Danny De Bie | not held |
| 1989 | (Belgium) Paul De Brauwer | not held |
| 1988 | (Belgium) Roland Liboton | not held |
| 1987 | (Belgium) Rudy De Bie | not held |
| 1986 | (Netherlands) Hennie Stamsnijder | not held |
| 1985 | (Netherlands) Hennie Stamsnijder | not held |
| 1984 | (Belgium) Roland Liboton | not held |
| 1983 | (Netherlands) Hennie Stamsnijder | not held |
