= Superprestige Gieten =

Cyclo-cross Gieten
Race details
- Date: October
- Region: Gieten, Netherlands
- Discipline: Cyclo-cross
- Competition: Superprestige

History
- First edition: 1976
- Editions: 45 (as of 2021)
- First winner: Hans Steekers (NLD)
- Most wins: Sven Nys (BEL) (8 wins)
- Most recent: Toon Aerts (BEL)

The Superprestige Gieten is a cyclo-cross race held in Gieten, Netherlands, which was part of the Superprestige and which was organized until 2021.

== Past winners ==
Year	Men's winner	Women's winner
2021	(Belgium) Toon Aerts	(Netherlands) Lucinda Brand
2020	(Belgium) Toon Aerts	(Netherlands) Ceylin del Carmen Alvarado
2019	(Belgium) Eli Iserbyt	(Netherlands) Ceylin del Carmen Alvarado
2018	(Netherlands) Mathieu van der Poel	(Netherlands) Annemarie Worst
2017	(Netherlands) Mathieu van der Poel	(Netherlands) Maud Kaptheijns
2016	(Netherlands) Mathieu van der Poel	(Belgium) Sanne Cant
2015	(Belgium) Wout Van Aert	(Belgium) Sanne Cant
2014	(Netherlands) Mathieu van der Poel	(Belgium) Sanne Cant
2013	(Belgium) Niels Albert	(United Kingdom) Helen Wyman
2012	(Belgium) Klaas Vantornout	(United Kingdom) Helen Wyman
2011	(Belgium) Sven Nys	(Netherlands) Marianne Vos
2010	(Belgium) Tom Meeusen	(Netherlands) Daphny van den Brand
2009	(Belgium) Sven Nys	(Netherlands) Daphny van den Brand
2008	(Belgium) Klaas Vantornout	(Netherlands) Sanne van Paassen
2007	(Belgium) Niels Albert	(Czechoslovakia) Pavla Havlikova
2006	(Belgium) Sven Nys	(Netherlands) Marianne Vos
2005	(Netherlands) Richard Groenendaal	(Netherlands) Marianne Vos
2004	(Belgium) Sven Nys	(Netherlands) Marianne Vos
2003	(Belgium) Bart Wellens	(Netherlands) Reza Hormes-Ravenstijn
2002	(Belgium) Sven Nys	(Netherlands) Reza Hormes-Ravenstijn
2001	(Belgium) Sven Nys	(Netherlands) Daphny van den Brand
2000	(Netherlands) Richard Groenendaal	(Netherlands) Daphny van den Brand
1999	(Belgium) Sven Nys	(Netherlands) Daphny van den Brand
1998	(Belgium) Sven Nys	(Netherlands) Daphny van den Brand
1997	(Netherlands) Richard Groenendaal	(Netherlands) Daphny van den Brand
1996	(Netherlands) Adrie van der Poel	(Netherlands) Reza Hormes-Ravenstijn
1995	(Belgium) Erwin Vervecken	not held
1994	(Belgium) Paul Herygers	not held
1993	(Belgium) Paul Herygers	not held
1992	(Belgium) Danny De Bie	not held
1991	(Belgium) Danny De Bie	not held
1990	(Belgium) Danny De Bie	not held
1989	(Belgium) Paul De Brauwer	not held
1988	(Belgium) Paul De Brauwer	not held
1987	(Belgium) Roland Liboton	not held
1986	(Belgium) Paul De Brauwer	not held
1985	(Belgium) Roland Liboton	not held
1984	(Czechoslovakia) Radomir Simunek sr.	not held
1983	(Netherlands) Reinier Groenendaal	not held
1982	(Netherlands) Reinier Groenendaal	not held
1981	(Netherlands) Reinier Groenendaal	not held
1980	(Germany) Reiner Paus	not held
1979	(Netherlands) Herman Snoeijink	not held
1977	(Netherlands) Gerrit Scheffer	not held
1976	(Netherlands) Hans Steekers	not held
