= 2026–27 Cyclo-cross Superprestige =

Cyclo-cross competition held in Belgium

- Forty-fifth edition of the Cyclo-cross Superprestige

Details
- Dates: 25 October 2026 – 2 January 2027
- Location: Belgium
- Races: 8

The 2026–27 Cyclo-cross Superprestige, also known as the Telenet Superprestige for sponsorship reasons, is a season-long cyclo-cross competition held in Belgium.

== Calendar ==
The competition consists of 8 events between 25 October 2026 and 2 January 2027.

#	Date	Race	Location	Class
1	26 October 2026	Druivencross	(Belgium) Overijse	C1
2	5 November 2026	Noordzeecross	(Belgium) Middelkerke	C1
3	11 November 2026	Jaarmarktcross Niel	(Belgium) Niel	C1
4	14 November 2026	Vlaamse Aardbeiencross	(Belgium) Merksplas	C1
5	6 December 2026	Cyclo-cross Ruddervoorde	(Belgium) Ruddervoorde	C1
6	25 December 2026	Grand Prix Eric De Vlaeminck	(Belgium) Heusden-Zolder	C1
7	30 December 2026	Diegem Cross	(Belgium) Diegem	C1
8	2 January 2027	Cyclocross Gullegem	(Belgium) Gullegem	C1

== Results ==
=== Elite Men ===
Date	Race	Winner	Runner-up	Third	Competition leader	Ref.
26 October	Overijse	Michael Vanthourenhout (BEL)	Witse Meeussen (BEL)	Niels Vandeputte (BEL)	Michael Vanthourenhout (BEL)	
5 November	Middelkerke	Joran Wyseure (BEL)	Michael Vanthourenhout (BEL)	Kevin Kuhn (SUI)	Michael Vanthourenhout (BEL)	
11 November	Niel	Cameron Mason (GBR)	Joran Wyseure (BEL)	Joris Nieuwenhuis (NED)	Cameron Mason (GBR)	
14 November	Merksplas	Niels Vandeputte (BEL)	Joran Wyseure (BEL)	Felipe Orts (ESP)	Joran Wyseure (BEL)	
6 December	Ruddervoorde					
25 December	Heusden-Zolder					
30 December	Diegem					
2 January	Gullegem					

=== Elite Women ===
Date	Race	Winner	Runner-up	Third	Competition leader	Ref.
26 October	Overijse	Lucinda Brand (NED)	Aniek van Alphen (NED)	Inge van der Heijden (NED)	Lucinda Brand (NED)	
5 November	Middelkerke	Aniek van Alphen (NED)	Inge van der Heijden (NED)	Denise Betsema (NED)	Aniek van Alphen (NED)	
11 November	Niel	Manon Bakker (NED)	Sara Casasola (ITA)	Denise Betsema (NED)	Aniek van Alphen (NED)	
14 November	Merksplas	Lucinda Brand (NED)	Inge van der Heijden (NED)	Sara Casasola (ITA)	Aniek van Alphen (NED)	
6 December	Ruddervoorde					
25 December	Heusden-Zolder					
30 December	Diegem					
2 January	Gullegem					

== Standings ==
=== Scoring system ===
If, when calculating the final classification, several riders have the same number of points, priority is given to the rider who started the most Superprestige races. If riders are still tied, preference will be given to the rider with the most wins in Superprestige races. If this factor is still inconclusive, the rider with the best result in the final race will be favored.

Position	1st	2nd	3rd	4th	5th	6th	7th	8th	9th	10th	11th	12th	13th	14th	15th
Points	15	14	13	12	11	10	9	8	7	6	5	4	3	2	1

=== Elite Men ===
Pos.	Rider	(Belgium) OVE	(Belgium) MID	(Belgium) NIE	(Belgium) MER	(Belgium) RUD	(Belgium) HEU	(Belgium) DIE	(Belgium) GUL	Points
1	(United Kingdom) Cameron Mason	4	4	1						39
2	(Belgium) Joran Wyseure	7	1	2						38
3	(Belgium) Michael Vanthourenhout	1	2	8						37
4	(Switzerland) Kevin Kuhn	5	3	6						34
5	(Spain) Felipe Orts	6	7	4						31
6	(Belgium) Niels Vandeputte	3	8	11						26
7	(Belgium) Jente Michels		5	9						18
8	(Belgium) Victor Van De Putte	9	9	14						16
9	(Netherlands) Mees Hendrikx	12	12	10						14
10	(Belgium) Witse Meeussen	2								14
11	(Netherlands) Joris Nieuwenhuis			3						13
12	(Belgium) Giel Lejeune			5						11
13	(Belgium) Viktor Vandenberghe	10		12						10
14	(Belgium) Gerben Kuypers		6							10
15	(Netherlands) Ryan Kamp			7						9
16	(Belgium) Lander Loockx	8								8
17	(Belgium) Wout Janssen		10	DNF						6
18	(Belgium) Clément Horny		11							5
19	(Netherlands) Pim Ronhaar	11								5
20	(United Kingdom) Thomas Mein	15		13						4
21	(Belgium) Jarno Bellens		13							3
22	(Belgium) Lars Daelmans	13								3
23	(Belgium) Toon Vandebosch		15	15						2
24	(Belgium) Laurens Sweeck		14	DNF						2
25	(Italy) Stefano Viezzi	14								2
Pos.	Rider	(Belgium) OVE	(Belgium) MID	(Belgium) NIE	(Belgium) MER	(Belgium) RUD	(Belgium) HEU	(Belgium) DIE	(Belgium) GUL	Points

Colour	Result
Gold	Winner
Silver	Second place
Bronze	Third Place
Green	Points finish
Blue	Non-points finish
Purple	Did not finish (DNF)
White	Did not start (DNS)
White	Cancelled (C)

=== Elite Women ===
Pos.	Rider	(Belgium) OVE	(Belgium) MID	(Belgium) NIE	(Belgium) MER	(Belgium) RUD	(Belgium) HEU	(Belgium) DIE	(Belgium) GUL	Points
1	(Netherlands) Aniek van Alphen	2	1	5	4					52
2	(Netherlands) Inge van der Heijden	3	2	7	2					50
3	(Netherlands) Denise Betsema	5	3	3	7					46
4	(France) Amandine Fouquenet	4	5	6	12					37
5	(Netherlands) Leonie Bentveld		6	4	5					33
6	(France) Hélène Clauzel	10	4	8	11					31
7	(Netherlands) Lucinda Brand	1		DNF	1					30
8	(Belgium) Julie Brouwers	9	8	9	9					29
9	(Italy) Sara Casasola			2	3					27
10	(Netherlands) Manon Bakker			1	10					21
11	(Italy) Rebecca Gariboldi	11	7	11	DNF					19
12	(Czech Republic) Kristýna Zemanová	6			8					18
13	(Belgium) Alicia Franck	7			13					12
14	(Netherlands) Fem van Empel				6					10
15	(Netherlands) Ceylin del Carmen Alvarado	8								8
16	(United Kingdom) Xan Crees		13	12	19					7
17	(Norway) Oda LaForce		9							7
18	(United Kingdom) Grace Inglis			10	17					6
19	(Netherlands) Annemarie Worst	DNF	10							6
20	(Netherlands) Lauren Molengraaf		12	15	18					5
21	(Netherlands) Puck Langenbarg		11							5
22	(United States) Mia Aseltine	12								4
23	(France) Camille Devigne		19	13						3
24	(Belgium) Sanne Laurijssen	13								3
25	(United Kingdom) Anna Kay	17	14	16	21					2
26	(Belgium) Kiona Crabbé	14	16							2
27	(Netherlands) Anniek Mos				14					2
28	(Netherlands) Femke Lenferink			14						2
29	(Belgium) Sterre Vervloet				15					1
30	(Belgium) Juline Delcommune		15							1
31	(Belgium) Xenna De Bruyckere	15								1
Pos.	Rider	(Belgium) OVE	(Belgium) MID	(Belgium) NIE	(Belgium) MER	(Belgium) RUD	(Belgium) HEU	(Belgium) DIE	(Belgium) GUL	Points

Colour	Result
Gold	Winner
Silver	Second place
Bronze	Third Place
Green	Points finish
Blue	Non-points finish
Purple	Did not finish (DNF)
White	Did not start (DNS)
White	Cancelled (C)

== See also ==
- 2026–27 UCI Cyclo-cross World Cup
- 2026–27 X²O Badkamers Trophy
- 2026–27 UCI Cyclo-cross season
