= 2024–25 Cyclo-cross Superprestige =

Cyclo-cross competition held in Belgium

- Forty-third edition of the Cyclo-cross Superprestige

Details
- Dates: 20 October 2024 – 8 February 2025
- Location: Belgium
- Races: 8

Champions
- Male individual champion: Niels Vandeputte (BEL)
- Female individual champion: Lucinda Brand (NED)

Location of Superprestige races in 2024–25.

The 2024–25 Cyclo-cross Superprestige, also known as the Telenet Superprestige for sponsorship reasons, was a season-long cyclo-cross competition held in Belgium.

== Calendar ==
The competition consisted of 8 events between 20 October 2024 and 8 February 2025.

#	Date	Race	Location	Class
1	20 October	Cyclo-cross Ruddervoorde	(Belgium) Ruddervoorde	C1
2	27 October	Druivencross	(Belgium) Overijse	C1
3	11 November	Jaarmarktcross Niel	(Belgium) Niel	C1
4	16 November	Vlaamse Aardbeiencross	(Belgium) Merksplas	C1
5	23 December	Zilvermeercross	(Belgium) Mol	C2
6	30 December	Diegem Cross	(Belgium) Diegem	C1
7	4 January	Cyclocross Gullegem	(Belgium) Gullegem	C2
8	8 February	Noordzeecross	(Belgium) Middelkerke	C1

== Results ==
=== Elite Men ===
Date	Race	Winner	Second	Third	Competition leader
20 October	Ruddervoorde	Joran Wyseure (BEL)	Niels Vandeputte (BEL)	Michael Vanthourenhout (BEL)	Joran Wyseure (BEL)
27 October	Overijse	Thibau Nys (BEL)	Eli Iserbyt (BEL)	Lars van der Haar (NED)	Joran Wyseure (BEL)
11 November	Niel	Laurens Sweeck (BEL)	Felipe Orts (ESP)	Niels Vandeputte (BEL)	Niels Vandeputte (BEL)
16 November	Merksplas	Laurens Sweeck (BEL)	Toon Aerts (BEL)	Lars van der Haar (NED)	Lars van der Haar (NED)
23 December	Mol	Mathieu van der Poel (NED)	Laurens Sweeck (BEL)	Michael Vanthourenhout (BEL)	Niels Vandeputte (BEL)
30 December	Diegem	Laurens Sweeck (BEL)	Niels Vandeputte (BEL)	Thibau Nys (BEL)	Niels Vandeputte (BEL)
4 January	Gullegem	Wout van Aert (BEL)	Eli Iserbyt (BEL)	Michael Vanthourenhout (BEL)	Niels Vandeputte (BEL)
8 February	Middelkerke	Joris Nieuwenhuis (NED)	Eli Iserbyt (BEL)	Niels Vandeputte (BEL)	Niels Vandeputte (BEL)

=== Elite Women ===
Date	Race	Winner	Second	Third	Competition leader
20 October	Ruddervoorde	Ceylin del Carmen Alvarado (NED)	Fem van Empel (NED)	Lucinda Brand (NED)	Ceylin del Carmen Alvarado (NED)
27 October	Overijse	Lucinda Brand (NED)	Fem van Empel (NED)	Sara Casasola (ITA)	Lucinda Brand (NED)
11 November	Niel	Ceylin del Carmen Alvarado (NED)	Lucinda Brand (NED)	Marion Norbert-Riberolle (BEL)	Ceylin del Carmen Alvarado (NED)
16 November	Merksplas	Ceylin del Carmen Alvarado (NED)	Lucinda Brand (NED)	Marie Schreiber (LUX)	Ceylin del Carmen Alvarado (NED)
23 December	Mol	Ceylin del Carmen Alvarado (NED)	Lucinda Brand (NED)	Inge van der Heijden (NED)	Ceylin del Carmen Alvarado (NED)
30 December	Diegem	Lucinda Brand (NED)	Ceylin del Carmen Alvarado (NED)	Inge van der Heijden (NED)	Ceylin del Carmen Alvarado (NED)
4 January	Gullegem	Lucinda Brand (NED)	Zoe Bäckstedt (GBR)	Ceylin del Carmen Alvarado (NED)	Lucinda Brand (NED)
8 February	Middelkerke	Inge van der Heijden (NED)	Lucinda Brand (NED)	Sara Casasola (ITA)	Lucinda Brand (NED)

== Standings ==
=== Scoring system ===
Position	1st	2nd	3rd	4th	5th	6th	7th	8th	9th	10th	11th	12th	13th	14th	15th
Points	15	14	13	12	11	10	9	8	7	6	5	4	3	2	1

=== Elite Men ===
Pos.	Rider	(Belgium) RUD	(Belgium) OVE	(Belgium) NIE	(Belgium) MER	(Belgium) MOL	(Belgium) DIE	(Belgium) GUL	(Belgium) MID	Points
1	(Belgium) Niels Vandeputte	2	4	3	6	5	2	5	3	98
2	(Netherlands) Lars van der Haar	4	3	5	3	6	6	10	5	86
3	(Belgium) Michael Vanthourenhout	3	6	6	5	3	DNF	3	4	82
4	(Belgium) Eli Iserbyt		2	4	7	19	5	2	2	74
5	(Belgium) Laurens Sweeck	19	15	1	1	2	1	14	7	71
6	(Spain) Felipe Orts	7	10	2	8	8	8	7	13	65
7	(Belgium) Joran Wyseure	1	5	14	9	4	15	4		60
8	(Belgium) Thibau Nys	13	1		4		3			43
9	(Belgium) Toon Aerts	10	13	7	2				6	42
10	(Switzerland) Kevin Kuhn	8	11	11	11	7	18	12	12	40
11	(Belgium) Jente Michels	6	7	DNF	10		9			32
12	(Belgium) Lander Loockx	12	8	DNF		10	12	13		25
13	(Netherlands) Ryan Kamp	DNF		17	21		7	6	14	21
14	(Belgium) Toon Vandebosch	11	18	9	15			15	11	19
15	(Belgium) Gerben Kuypers	5	DNF	8	18					19
16	(Belgium) Jens Adams	15	19	13	12				8	16
17	(Belgium) Witse Meeussen	25	16	12	13		14		9	16
18	(Netherlands) Mathieu van der Poel					1				15
19	(Belgium) Wout van Aert							1		15
20	(Netherlands) Joris Nieuwenhuis								1	15
21	(Belgium) Emiel Verstrynge	28	17	10				8		14
22	(Netherlands) David Haverdings	9	9		17					14
23	(Belgium) Kay De Bruyckere	17	14	19				11	10	13
24	(Netherlands) Tibor Del Grosso						4			12
25	(United Kingdom) Cameron Mason		30	18	24		11	9	20	12
26	(Belgium) Daan Soete		23	16	19	9	19			7
27	(Belgium) Gianni Vermeersch						10	19		6
28	(Belgium) Wout Janssen				23	11		23	19	5
29	(Belgium) Clément Horny	24	25			12	22		15	5
30	(Belgium) Aaron Dockx		12	21	DNF					4
31	(Belgium) Anton Ferdinande			22			13			3
32	(Belgium) Yorben Lauryssen	23	DNF			13		28	DNF	3
33	(Belgium) Thijs Aerts				26	14		17	22	2
34	(Belgium) Yordi Corsus	14	24							2
35	(Netherlands) Pim Ronhaar				14					2
36	(Belgium) Victor van de Putte	18	20	15	20		24	22	DNF	1
37	(Belgium) Arne Baers					15				1
Pos.	Rider	(Belgium) RUD	(Belgium) OVE	(Belgium) NIE	(Belgium) MER	(Belgium) MOL	(Belgium) DIE	(Belgium) GUL	(Belgium) MID	Points

Colour	Result
Gold	Winner
Silver	Second place
Bronze	Third Place
Green	Points finish
Blue	Non-points finish
Purple	Did not finish (DNF)
White	Did not start (DNS)
White	Cancelled (C)

=== Elite Women ===
Pos.	Rider	(Belgium) RUD	(Belgium) OVE	(Belgium) NIE	(Belgium) MER	(Belgium) MOL	(Belgium) DIE	(Belgium) GUL	(Belgium) MID	Points
1	(Netherlands) Lucinda Brand	3	1	2	2	2	1	1	2	114
2	(Netherlands) Ceylin del Carmen Alvarado	1	4	1	1	1	2	3		99
3	(Netherlands) Inge van der Heijden	6	7	7	5	3	3		1	80
4	(Italy) Sara Casasola	4	3	4	4				3	62
5	(Netherlands) Aniek van Alphen	8	11	9	11	6	6	6	9	62
6	(Netherlands) Leonie Bentveld	7	14	8	9		4	4	8	58
7	(Belgium) Sanne Cant	12		12	14	4	5	7	4	54
8	(Belgium) Marion Norbert-Riberolle	10	17	3	12			5	6	44
9	(Belgium) Laura Verdonschot	5	10	6	10					33
10	(Netherlands) Fem van Empel	2	2							28
11	(France) Hélène Clauzel		6				12		5	25
12	(United Kingdom) Zoe Bäckstedt				7			2		23
13	(Belgium) Julie Brouwers	15			15	5			7	22
14	(Belgium) Alicia Franck	9	13	11		DNF		9		22
15	(Netherlands) Annemarie Worst			5	6					21
16	(Netherlands) Denise Betsema	13	12	10	13					16
17	(Netherlands) Yara Kastelijn					9		8		15
18	(Luxembourg) Marie Schreiber				3					13
19	(Netherlands) Lauren Molengraaf					7			12	13
20	(Belgium) Fleur Moors	11	8							13
21	(United Kingdom) Ella Maclean-Howell					10	9			13
22	(Belgium) Marthe Truyen					14	10	11		13
23	(Netherlands) Jamie De Beer		21			12	11	12		13
24	(Hungary) Blanka Vas		5							11
25	(Italy) Letizia Borghesi					16	7			9
26	(United Kingdom) Anna Kay	18	15		16		8			9
27	(Belgium) Jinse Peeters		20		17	15		13	11	9
28	(Netherlands) Manon Bakker				8					8
29	(Italy) Rebecca Gariboldi					8				8
30	(France) Amandine Fouquenet		9							7
31	(Belgium) Kiona Crabbé		16	18	22				10	6
32	(Netherlands) Puck Langenbarg	23						10		6
33	(Italy) Francesca Baroni	14	19	13	19				15	6
34	(Netherlands) Sophie Von Berswordt					11				5
35	(Belgium) Xaydée Van Sinaey		18			13		14		5
36	(Belgium) Kim Van De Steene	17							13	3
37	(Germany) Judith Krahl						13			3
38	(Italy) Lucia Bramati						14	17		2
39	(Belgium) Shanyl De Schoesitter	22	22						14	2
40	(Denmark) Ann-Dorthe Lisbygd			14						2
41	(France) Perrine Clauzel					18	15			1
42	(France) Camille Devigne		23	15	28	26		19		1
43	(Belgium) Nette Coppens	19						15		1
Pos.	Rider	(Belgium) RUD	(Belgium) OVE	(Belgium) NIE	(Belgium) MER	(Belgium) MOL	(Belgium) DIE	(Belgium) GUL	(Belgium) MID	Points

Colour	Result
Gold	Winner
Silver	Second place
Bronze	Third Place
Green	Points finish
Blue	Non-points finish
Purple	Did not finish (DNF)
White	Did not start (DNS)
White	Cancelled (C)

== See also ==
- 2024–25 UCI Cyclo-cross World Cup
- 2024–25 X²O Badkamers Trophy
- 2024–25 UCI Cyclo-cross season
