= Pim Ronhaar =

Dutch cyclo-cross and road cyclist

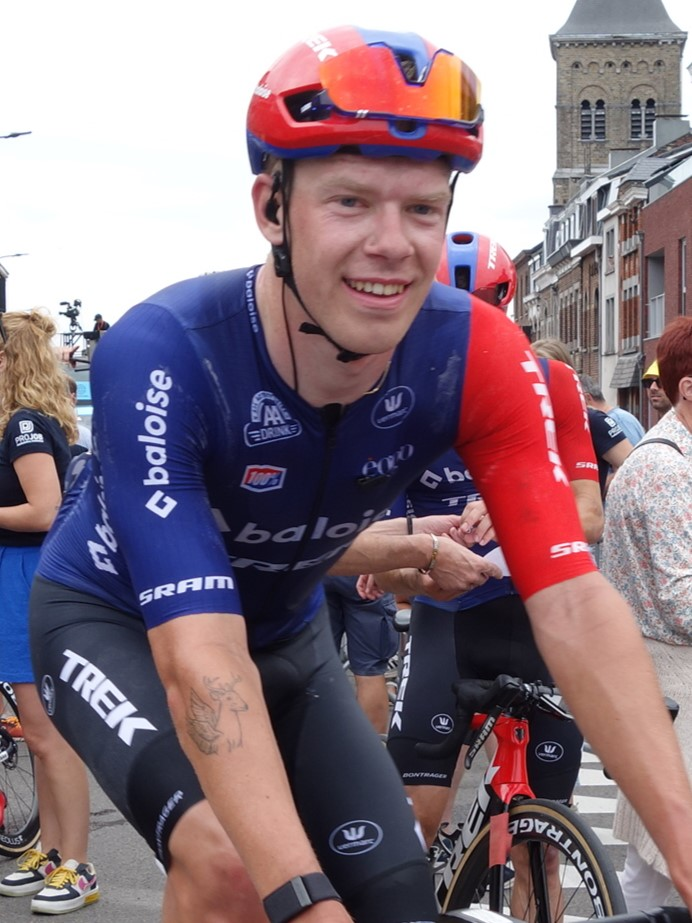
- Ronhaar in 2024

Personal information
- Nickname: Ronnie
- Born: 20 July 2001 (age 25) Hellendoorn, Netherlands
- Height: 1.76 m (5 ft 9 in)
- Weight: 60 kg (132 lb)

Cycling career
- Sport: Cycling
- Current team: Baloise Verzekeringen–Het Poetsbureau Lions
- Disciplines: Cyclo-cross; Road
- Role: Rider

Professional teams
- 2020–2021: Pauwels Sauzen–Bingoal
- 2021–: Baloise–Trek Lions

Major wins
- Cyclo-cross World Cup 2 individual wins (2023–24)
Medal record
Men's cyclo-cross
Representing Netherlands
World Championships
Gold medal – first place	2021 Ostend	Under-23 Race
European Championships
Gold medal – first place	2018 's-Hertogenbosch	Junior Race

Pim Ronhaar (born 20 July 2001) is a Dutch cyclo-cross and road cyclist, who currently rides for UCI Cyclo-cross Team Baloise Verzekeringen–Het Poetsbureau Lions. He won the gold medal in the men's under-23 event at the 2021 UCI Cyclo-cross World Championships in Ostend.

== Major results ==
=== Cyclo-cross ===
2017–2018
2nd Overall UCI Junior World Cup

1st Koksijde
1st Zeven
3rd Bogense
5th Hoogerheide

3rd Overall Junior Superprestige

1st Zonhoven
1st Gavere
2nd Gieten
3rd Hoogstraten
3rd Middelkerke

Junior DVV Trophy

2nd Ronse
2nd Essen

5th UEC European Junior Championships
2018–2019
1st UEC European Junior Championships
1st National Junior Championships
UCI Junior World Cup

1st Koksijde
5th Tábor

Junior Brico Cross

1st Geraardsbergen
2nd Ronse

Junior Superprestige

3rd Ruddervoorde
3rd Gavere

5th UCI World Junior Championships
2019–2020
3rd National Under-23 Championships
5th UCI World Under-23 Championships
UCI Under-23 World Cup

5th Nommay

2020–2021
1st UCI World Under-23 Championships
5th UEC European Under-23 Championships
2021–2022
1st Overall Under-23 X²O Badkamers Trophy

1st Koppenberg
1st Kortrijk
1st Lille
1st Brussels
2nd Herentals
3rd Baal

UCI Under-23 World Cup

1st Namur
2nd Dendermonde
4th Flamanville

UCI World Cup

3rd Besançon
5th Fayetteville

Ethias Cross

3rd Essen

2022–2023
1st Mechelen
UCI Under-23 World Cup

2nd Maasmechelen
5th Tábor

5th UEC European Under-23 Championships
2023–2024
3rd Overall UCI World Cup

1st Dendermonde
1st Dublin
2nd Namur
3rd Waterloo
3rd Flamanville
3rd Hoogerheide
4th Hulst
4th Zonhoven

1st Waterloo
2nd National Championships
X²O Badkamers Trophy

2nd Koksijde

3rd Woerden
4th UEC European Championships
2024–2025
2nd National Championships
Exact Cross

2nd Heerde

3rd Overall X²O Badkamers Trophy

2nd Herentals
2nd Baal

UCI World Cup

3rd Hulst
4th Namur

2025–2026
Superprestige

2nd Overijse

3rd National Championships
X²O Badkamers Trophy

3rd Koppenberg

4th UEC European Championships
UCI World Cup

4th Antwerpen

=== Mountain bike ===
2020
1st Cross-country, National Under-23 Championships

=== Road ===
2022
1st Mountains classification, Flèche du Sud
2023
1st Overall Flèche du Sud

1st Young rider classification
1st Prologue

2nd Overall Tour de Namur
2024
1st Overall Flèche du Sud

1st Points classification
1st Stage 3

4th Overall Tour de la Mirabelle

1st Points classification
1st Prologue

7th Dwars door het Hageland
