= Inge van der Heijden =

Dutch cyclist (born 1999)

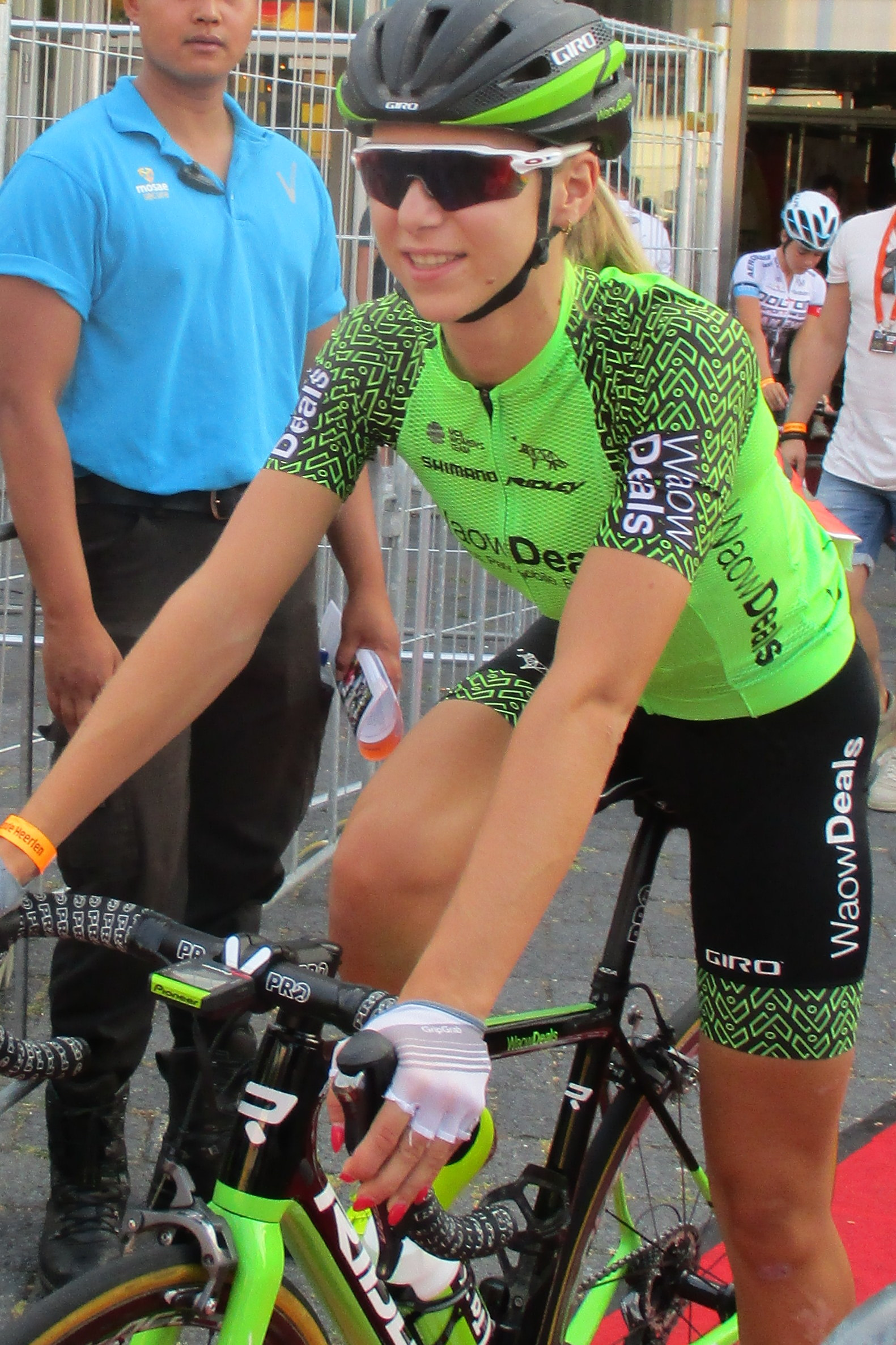
- Van der Heijden in 2018

Personal information
- Full name: Inge van der Heijden
- Born: 12 August 1999 (age 27)

Cycling career
- Sport: Cycling
- Current team: Fenix–Premier Tech (road); 777 (cyclo-cross)
- Disciplines: Road; Cyclo-cross
- Role: Rider

Amateur team
- 2017: ZZPR.nl

Professional teams
- 2018–2020: WaowDeals Pro Cycling
- 2020–: Ciclismo Mundial (road)
- 2020–: 777 (cyclo-cross)

Major wins
- Cyclo-cross European Championships (2025)
Medal record
Representing Netherlands
Women's cyclo-cross
World Championships
Gold medal – first place	2019 Bogense	Under-23
European Championships
Gold medal – first place	2025 Middelkerke	Elite
Silver medal – second place	2018 Rosmalen	Under-23

Inge van der Heijden (born 12 August 1999) is a Dutch professional racing cyclist, who currently rides for UCI Women's WorldTeam Fenix–Premier Tech in road cycling, and in cyclo-cross for UCI Cyclo-cross Team 777.

== Major results ==
2015–2016
1st Leudelange
3rd National Under-23 Championships
2016–2017
2nd National Under-23 Championships
2017–2018
1st National Under-23 Championships
Toi Toi Cup

2nd Slany

2018–2019
1st UCI World Under-23 Championships
1st Rucphen
2nd UEC European Under-23 Championships
3rd National Under-23 Championships
Ethias Cross

3rd Hulst

3rd Mol
2019–2020
1st National Under-23 Championships
Ethias Cross

2nd Eeklo
2nd Maldegem
3rd Meulebeke

3rd Oostmalle
3rd Mol
3rd Woerden
2020–2021
2nd Gullegem
Ethias Cross

3rd Essen

3rd Oostmalle
2021–2022
Superprestige

2nd Boom
3rd Ruddervoorde

2022–2023
1st Mechelen
1st Fayetteville
2nd Overall Superprestige

2nd Ruddervoorde
2nd Heusden-Zolder
2nd Gullegem
3rd Niel
3rd Merksplas

UCI World Cup

3rd Besançon

2023–2024
UCI World Cup

2nd Zonhoven
4th Maasmechelen
5th Namur
5th Dublin
5th Troyes

Superprestige

3rd Overijse
3rd Heusden-Zolder
3rd Diegem

3rd Gullegem
4th UEC European Championships
2024–2025
X²O Badkamers Trophy

2nd Lille

Exact Cross

2nd Maldegem
3rd Sint-Niklaas

2nd Oostmalle
3rd Overall Superprestige

1st Middelkerke
3rd Mol
3rd Diegem

4th UCI World Championships
UCI World Cup

4th Dublin
4th Zonhoven
5th Hulst

2025–2026
1st UEC European Championships
1st Oostmalle
Exact Cross

1st Meulebeke
1st Kortrijk
2nd Maldegem
2nd Sint-Niklaas

3rd Overall X²O Badkamers Trophy

2nd Hamme
2nd Brussels
3rd Lille

3rd Overall Superprestige

2nd Niel
3rd Merksplas

UCI World Cup

3rd Tábor
4th Flamanville

3rd Ardooie
3rd Woerden
2026–2027
Superprestige

2nd Merksplas
