= Nacht van Woerden =

Race details
- Date: Late October
- Region: Woerden, Netherlands
- Discipline: Cyclo-cross
- Web site: www.nachtvanwoerden.nl

History (men)
- First edition: 2000
- Editions: 24 (as of 2026)
- First winner: Erwin Vervecken (BEL)
- Most wins: Lars van der Haar (NED) (8 wins)
- Most recent: Joris Nieuwenhuis (NED)

History (women)
- First edition: 2010
- Editions: 15 (as of 2026)
- First winner: Daphny van den Brand (NED)
- Most wins: Daphny van den Brand (NED); Lucinda Brand (NED) (2 wins each)
- Most recent: Marie Schreiber (LUX)

The Nacht van Woerden is a cyclo-cross race that has been organized annually since 2000 in Woerden, the Netherlands as a category C2 UCI event.

== Winners ==
=== Men ===
Year	Winner	Second	Third
2000	(Belgium) Erwin Vervecken	(Belgium) Mario De Clercq	(Belgium) Tom Vannoppen
2001	(Belgium) Bart Wellens	(Belgium) Sven Nys	(Belgium) Erwin Vervecken
2002	(Netherlands) Richard Groenendaal	(Belgium) Bart Wellens	(Belgium) Sven Nys
2003	(Belgium) Bart Wellens	(Belgium) Ben Berden	(Belgium) Peter Van Santvliet
2004	(Belgium) Sven Nys	(Belgium) Erwin Vervecken	(Netherlands) Camiel van den Bergh
2005	(Netherlands) Richard Groenendaal	(Belgium) Erwin Vervecken	(Netherlands) Eddy van IJzendoorn
2006	No race		
2007	(Belgium) Erwin Vervecken	(Switzerland) Christian Heule	(Netherlands) Richard Groenendaal
2008	(Belgium) Klaas Vantornout	(Netherlands) Lars Boom	(Netherlands) Thijs Al
2009	(Belgium) Sven Nys	(Netherlands) Gerben de Knegt	(Netherlands) Thijs Al
2010	(Belgium) Tom Meeusen	(Belgium) Bart Aernouts	(Netherlands) Gerben de Knegt
2011	(Belgium) Bart Aernouts	(Netherlands) Lars van der Haar	(Belgium) Dieter Vanthourenhout
2012	(Belgium) Bart Aernouts	(Belgium) Bart Wellens	(Belgium) Dieter Vanthourenhout
2013	(Germany) Marcel Meisen	(Netherlands) Mike Teunissen	(Belgium) Bart Aernouts
2014	(Netherlands) Thijs van Amerongen	(Netherlands) Lars van der Haar	(Netherlands) Corné van Kessel
2015	(Netherlands) Lars van der Haar	(Germany) Marcel Meisen	(Netherlands) Stan Godrie
2016	(Netherlands) Lars van der Haar	(Netherlands) Stan Godrie	(Belgium) Dieter Vanthourenhout
2017	(Netherlands) Lars van der Haar	(Netherlands) David van der Poel	(Netherlands) Corné van Kessel
2018	(Netherlands) Lars van der Haar	(Netherlands) Corné van Kessel	(Netherlands) Joris Nieuwenhuis
2019	(Netherlands) Lars van der Haar	(Netherlands) Joris Nieuwenhuis	(Spain) Felipe Orts
2020-2021	Cancelled		
2022	(Netherlands) Lars van der Haar	(Belgium) Quinten Hermans	(Netherlands) Ryan Kamp
2023	(Netherlands) Lars van der Haar	(Belgium) Laurens Sweeck	(Netherlands) Pim Ronhaar
2024	(Netherlands) Lars van der Haar	(Belgium) Michael Vanthourenhout	(Netherlands) David Haverdings
2025	(Spain) Felipe Orts	(Netherlands) Pim Ronhaar	(Belgium) Jente Michels
2026	(Netherlands) Joris Nieuwenhuis	(Netherlands) Niels Vandeputte	(Spain) Felipe Orts

=== Women ===
Year	Winner	Second	Third
2010	(Netherlands) Daphny van den Brand	(Netherlands) Sanne van Paassen	(United Kingdom) Helen Wyman
2011	(Netherlands) Daphny van den Brand	(United Kingdom) Helen Wyman	(France) Lucie Chainel-Lefèvre
2012	(Netherlands) Sanne van Paassen	(United Kingdom) Helen Wyman	(Belgium) Sanne Cant
2013	(Netherlands) Marianne Vos	(United States) Katie Compton	(United Kingdom) Helen Wyman
2014	(Belgium) Ellen Van Loy	(United States) Katie Compton	(United Kingdom) Helen Wyman
2015	(Czech Republic) Pavla Havlíková	(Belgium) Ellen Van Loy	(Netherlands) Sanne van Paassen
2016	(Netherlands) Lucinda Brand	(Italy) Alice Maria Arzuffi	(Netherlands) Maud Kaptheijns
2017	(United Kingdom) Helen Wyman	(Belgium) Ellen Van Loy	(Netherlands) Ceylin Alvarado
2018	(Netherlands) Marianne Vos	(Belgium) Ellen Van Loy	(Netherlands) Lucinda Brand
2019	(Netherlands) Maud Kaptheijns	(Belgium) Laura Verdonschot	(Netherlands) Inge van der Heijden
2020-2021	Cancelled		
2022	(Hungary) Blanka Vas	(Netherlands) Marianne Vos	(Netherlands) Puck Pieterse
2023	(Netherlands) Fem van Empel	(Netherlands) Manon Bakker	(United Kingdom) Zoe Bäckstedt
2024	(Netherlands) Lucinda Brand	(Luxembourg) Marie Schreiber	(Netherlands) Fem van Empel
2025	(Netherlands) Fem van Empel	(Netherlands) Aniek van Alphen	(Netherlands) Inge van der Heijden
2026	(Luxembourg) Marie Schreiber	(Netherlands) Aniek van Alphen	(Netherlands) Lucinda Brand
