= Lars van der Haar =

Dutch cyclist (born 1991)

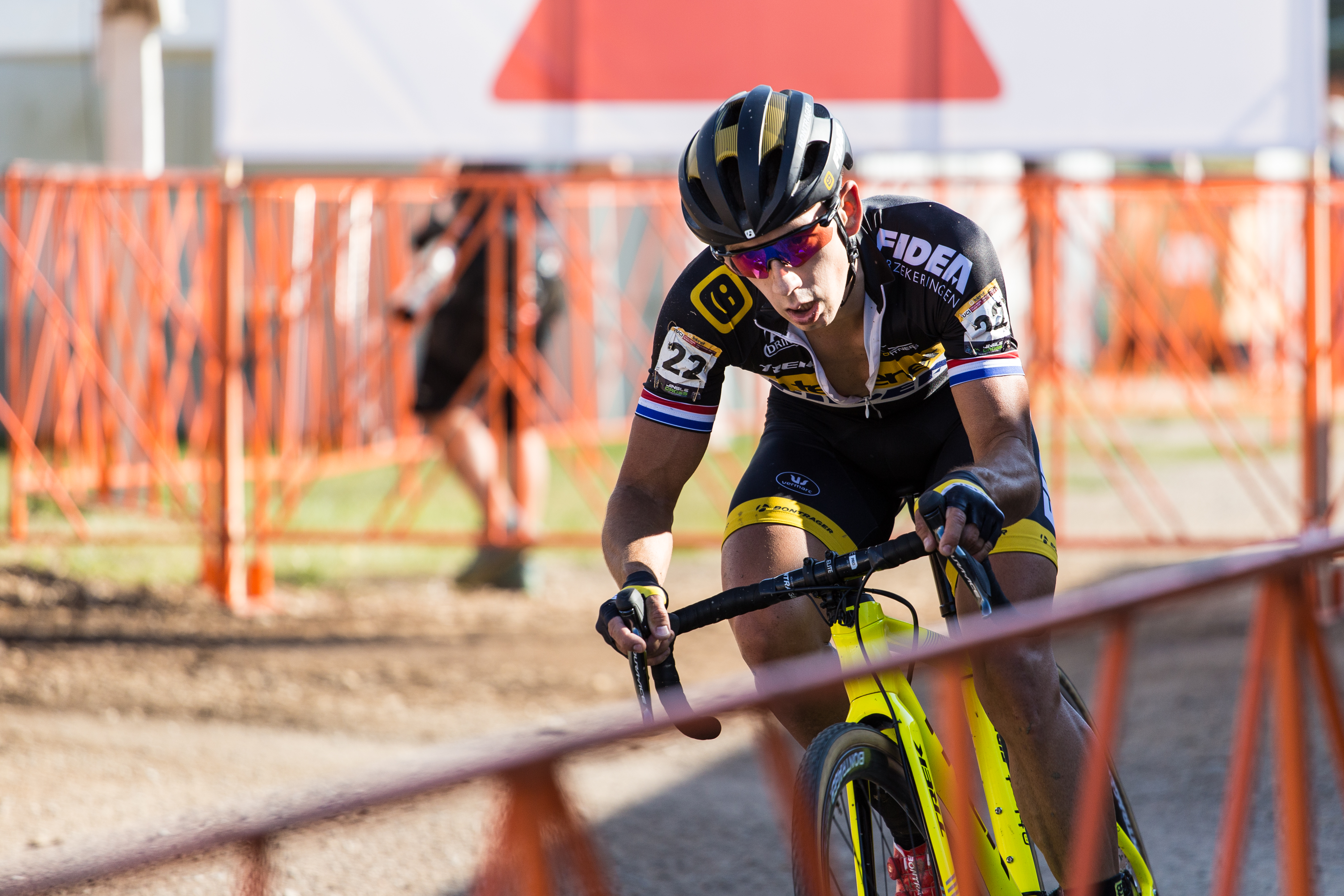
- Van der Haar, Iowa City, 2017

Personal information
- Born: 23 July 1991 (age 35) Amersfoort, Netherlands
- Height: 1.69 m (5 ft 7 in)
- Weight: 58 kg (128 lb)

Cycling career
- Sport: Cycling
- Current team: Retired
- Discipline: Cyclo-cross
- Role: Rider

Professional teams
- 2010–2012: AA Drink Cycling Team
- 2012–2014: Rabobank Continental Team
- 2014: Development Team Giant–Shimano
- 2015–2016: Team Giant–Alpecin
- 2017–2026: Telenet–Fidea Lions

Major wins
- Cyclo-cross European Championships (2015, 2021) National Championships (2013, 2014, 2022, 2023) World Cup (2013–14) 9 individual wins (2013–14—2016–17, 2021–22, 2023–24) Superprestige (2022–23) Trophy (2023–24)
Medal record
Men's cyclo-cross
Representing Netherlands
World Championships
Gold medal – first place	2011 Sankt Wendel	Under-23
Gold medal – first place	2012 Koksijde	Under-23
Silver medal – second place	2016 Heusden-Zolder	Elite
Silver medal – second place	2022 Fayetteville	Elite
Bronze medal – third place	2013 Louisville	Elite
Bronze medal – third place	2015 Tabor	Elite
European Championships
Gold medal – first place	2021 Wijster	Elite
Gold medal – first place	2015 Huijbergen	Elite
Gold medal – first place	2010 Frankfurt	Under-23
Gold medal – first place	2011 Lucca	Under-23
Silver medal – second place	2022 Namur	Elite
Silver medal – second place	2017 Tabor	Elite
Silver medal – second place	2008 Liévin	Junior
Bronze medal – third place	2023 Pontchâteau	Elite
Bronze medal – third place	2020 Rosmalen	Elite

Lars van der Haar (born 23 July 1991 in Amersfoort, Netherlands) is a Dutch former professional cyclo-cross and road cyclist.

== Career ==
Van der Haar joined the development team of the Giant–Shimano professional squad, for the 2014 season. He was subsequently promoted to the senior team for the 2015 season.

He retired in February 2026.

== Personal life ==
In July 2019, he married fellow cyclist Lucy Garner.

== Major results ==
=== Road ===
2012
3rd Overall Tour Nivernais Morvan
2013
5th Overall Tour d'Azerbaïdjan
2014
Oberösterreich Rundfahrt

1st Points classification
1st Stage 1

8th Ronde van Overijssel
2017
7th Ronde van Limburg
8th Heistse Pijl
2018
1st Ronde van Papendrecht
5th Overall Oberösterreich Rundfahrt

1st Points classification

10th Overall Tour de Liège
2021
3rd Overall Tour de Namur
2022
1st Stage 5 Tour de Namur

=== Cyclo-cross ===
2007–2008
1st Junior Hamme
3rd National Junior Championships
2008–2009
1st National Junior Championships
2nd UEC European Junior Championships
2nd Overall Junior Superprestige

1st Gieten
2nd Gavere
2nd Diegem
3rd Ruddervoorde
3rd Hamme
3rd Vorselaar

2nd Overall UCI Junior World Cup

2nd Tábor
2nd Heusden-Zolder
4th Pijnacker
5th Roubaix

5th UCI World Junior Championships
2009–2010
Under-23 Gazet van Antwerpen

2nd Oostmalle

2010–2011
1st UCI World Under-23 Championships
1st UEC European Under-23 Championships
1st National Under-23 Championships
1st Overall UCI Under-23 World Cup

2nd Pontchâteau
3rd Koksijde
3rd Kalmthout
3rd Hoogerheide
5th Heusden-Zolder

1st Overall Under-23 Gazet van Antwerpen

1st Essen
1st Oostmalle
2nd Hasselt
2nd Lille
3rd Koppenberg

1st Under-23 Cauberg
2nd Overall Under-23 Superprestige

1st Zonhoven
1st Gieten
1st Diegem
2nd Gavere
2nd Middelkerke

2011–2012
1st UCI World Under-23 Championships
1st UEC European Under-23 Championships
1st National Under-23 Championships
1st Overall UCI Under-23 World Cup

1st Tábor
1st Liévin
1st Hoogerheide
4th Koksijde

1st Overall Under-23 Superprestige

1st Gavere
1st Gieten
1st Diegem
2nd Zonhoven
2nd Hamme
2nd Middelkerke
3rd Ruddervoorde

1st Overall Under-23 Gazet van Antwerpen

1st Koppenberg
1st Hasselt
1st Baal
2nd Lille
3rd Essen

1st Las Vegas
1st Harderwijk
1st Under-23 Kalmthout
1st Under-23 Cauberg
2012–2013
1st National Championships
1st Rucphen
3rd UCI World Championships
4th Overall UCI World Cup

2nd Tábor
2nd Hoogerheide
5th Roubaix

2013–2014
1st National Championships
1st Overall UCI World Cup

1st Cauberg
1st Tábor
1st Heusden-Zolder
2nd Rome
4th Nommay
5th Namur

1st Surhuisterveen
1st Crossquer
Superprestige

2nd Gieten

Bpost Bank Trophy

2nd Lille

2nd Las Vegas
2nd Overijse
2nd Kalmthout
2nd Mechelen
3rd Brabant
2014–2015
1st Surhuisterveen
1st Brabant
1st Rucphen
2nd Overall UCI World Cup

1st Cauberg
1st Heusden-Zolder
2nd Namur
4th Milton Keynes
5th Hoogerheide

Bpost Bank Trophy

2nd Baal

2nd Las Vegas
2nd Woerden
2nd Heerlen
3rd UCI World Championships
3rd National Championships
3rd Overall Superprestige

2nd Gieten
2nd Spa-Francorchamps
3rd Zonhoven

Soudal Classics

3rd Neerpelt

2015–2016
1st UEC European Championships
1st Woerden
1st Boom
2nd UCI World Championships
2nd National Championships
2nd Overall UCI World Cup

1st Cauberg
3rd Heusden-Zolder
3rd Lignières-en-Berry
4th Las Vegas
4th Koksijde
5th Namur

3rd Overall Superprestige

2nd Gieten
3rd Diegem

BPost Bank Trophy

3rd Ronse
3rd Koppenberg
3rd Antwerpen

3rd Mechelen
2016–2017
UCI World Cup

1st Hoogerheide

1st Woerden
1st Rucphen
Brico Cross

2nd Hulst

3rd National Championships
DVV Trophy

3rd Koppenberg

3rd Surhuisterveen
4th UCI World Championships
2017–2018
DVV Trophy

1st Ronse
3rd Koppenberg

1st Woerden
2nd UEC European Championships
2nd National Championships
UCI World Cup

2nd Koksijde
4th Bogense
4th Heusden-Zolder
5th Iowa City

Superprestige

3rd Zonhoven
3rd Boom
3rd Ruddervoorde

3rd Iowa City
5th UCI World Championships
2018–2019
Brico Cross

1st Geraardsbergen
2nd Hulst

1st Rucphen
1st Woerden
2nd National Championships
UCI World Cup

3rd Tábor
4th Koksijde
4th Pontchâteau

Soudal Classics

3rd Leuven

2019–2020
1st Woerden
2nd National Championships
3rd Overall Superprestige

2nd Gavere

Rectavit Series

3rd Leuven
3rd Neerpelt

5th Overall UCI World Cup

3rd Tábor
4th Nommay
4th Koksijde

5th UEC European Championships
2020–2021
X²O Badkamers Trophy

2nd Koppenberg
2nd Kortrijk

3rd UEC European Championships
Superprestige

3rd Ruddervoorde
3rd Heusden-Zolder

Ethias Cross

3rd Beringen

3rd Oostmalle
3rd Mol
UCI World Cup

5th Tábor

2021–2022
1st UEC European Championships
1st National Championships
2nd UCI World Championships
Ethias Cross

2nd Lokeren
2nd Beringen
3rd Maldegem

3rd Overall Superprestige

1st Gavere
3rd Boom

X²O Badkamers Trophy

3rd Koppenberg
3rd Lille

5th Overall UCI World Cup

1st Tábor
2nd Iowa City
2nd Zonhoven
2nd Hoogerheide
3rd Hulst
4th Waterloo
5th Rucphen
5th Koksijde

2022–2023
1st National Championships
1st Overall Superprestige

2nd Niel
2nd Merksplas
2nd Middelkerke
3rd Ruddervoorde
3rd Heusden-Zolder

1st Waterloo
1st Woerden
2nd Overall X²O Badkamers Trophy

1st Koppenberg
2nd Kortrijk
2nd Lille
3rd Brussels

2nd UEC European Championships
2nd Oostmalle
4th Overall UCI World Cup

2nd Tábor
2nd Maasmechelen
3rd Waterloo
3rd Overijse
4th Dublin
4th Hulst
5th Gavere
5th Antwerpen

Exact Cross

2nd Sint Niklaas
3rd Beringen
3rd Meulebeke

4th UCI World Championships
2023–2024
1st Overall X²O Badkamers Trophy

2nd Koppenberg
2nd Kortrijk
2nd Melden

4th Overall UCI World Cup

1st Maasmechelen
2nd Dendermonde
2nd Flamanville
2nd Troyes
3rd Hulst
5th Waterloo
5th Gavere

1st Woerden
Superprestige

2nd Ruddervoorde
3rd Overijse

3rd UEC European Championships
3rd National Championships
Exact Cross

3rd Sint Niklaas

2024–2025
X²O Badkamers Trophy

1st Koppenberg
3rd Brussels

Exact Cross

1st Beringen
2nd Sint-Niklaas

1st Woerden
2nd Overall Superprestige

3rd Overijse
3rd Merksplas

UCI World Cup

3rd Benidorm
3rd Hoogerheide
4th Gavere
5th Zonhoven

5th UEC European Championships
2025–2026
2nd National Championships
UCI World Cup

2nd Flamanville
4th Namur
