= 2025–26 Cyclo-cross Superprestige =

Cyclo-cross competition held in Belgium

- Forty-fourth edition of the Cyclo-cross Superprestige

Details
- Dates: 19 October 2025 – 7 February 2026
- Location: Belgium
- Races: 8

Champions
- Male individual champion: Niels Vandeputte (BEL)
- Female individual champion: Aniek van Alphen (NED)

Location of Superprestige races in 2025–26.

The 2025–26 Cyclo-cross Superprestige, also known as the Telenet Superprestige for sponsorship reasons, was a season-long cyclo-cross competition held in Belgium.

== Calendar ==
The competition consisted of 8 events between 19 October 2025 and 7 February 2026.

#	Date	Race	Location	Class
1	19 October 2025	Cyclo-cross Ruddervoorde	(Belgium) Ruddervoorde	C1
2	26 October 2025	Druivencross	(Belgium) Overijse	C1
3	11 November 2025	Jaarmarktcross Niel	(Belgium) Niel	C1
4	15 November 2025	Vlaamse Aardbeiencross	(Belgium) Merksplas	C1
5	23 December 2025	Grand Prix Eric De Vlaeminck	(Belgium) Heusden-Zolder	C1
6	30 December 2025	Diegem Cross	(Belgium) Diegem	C1
7	3 January 2026	Cyclocross Gullegem	(Belgium) Gullegem	C2
8	7 February 2026	Noordzeecross	(Belgium) Middelkerke	C1

== Results ==
=== Elite Men ===
Date	Race	Winner	Second	Third	Competition leader
19 October	Ruddervoorde	Michael Vanthourenhout (BEL)	Joris Nieuwenhuis (NED)	Niels Vandeputte (BEL)	Michael Vanthourenhout (BEL)
26 October	Overijse	Michael Vanthourenhout (BEL)	Pim Ronhaar (NED)	Emiel Verstrynge (BEL)	Michael Vanthourenhout (BEL)
11 November	Niel	Laurens Sweeck (BEL)	Niels Vandeputte (BEL)	Michael Vanthourenhout (BEL)	Michael Vanthourenhout (BEL)
15 November	Merksplas	Joris Nieuwenhuis (NED)	Niels Vandeputte (BEL)	Emiel Verstrynge (BEL)	Niels Vandeputte (BEL)
23 December	Heusden-Zolder	Tibor Del Grosso (NED)	Wout van Aert (BEL)	Michael Vanthourenhout (BEL)	Niels Vandeputte (BEL)
30 December	Diegem	Tibor Del Grosso (NED)	Joran Wyseure (BEL)	Thibau Nys (BEL)	Niels Vandeputte (BEL)
3 January	Gullegem	Niels Vandeputte (BEL)	Michael Vanthourenhout (BEL)	Joris Nieuwenhuis (NED)	Niels Vandeputte (BEL)
7 February	Middelkerke	Michael Vanthourenhout (BEL)	Niels Vandeputte (BEL)	Gerben Kuypers (BEL)	Niels Vandeputte (BEL)

=== Elite Women ===
Date	Race	Winner	Second	Third	Competition leader
19 October	Ruddervoorde	Marion Norbert-Riberolle (BEL)	Sara Casasola (ITA)	Amandine Fouquenet (FRA)	Marion Norbert-Riberolle (BEL)
26 October	Overijse	Sara Casasola (ITA)	Lucinda Brand (NED)	Aniek van Alphen (NED)	Sara Casasola (ITA)
11 November	Niel	Lucinda Brand (NED)	Inge van der Heijden (NED)	Aniek van Alphen (NED)	Inge van der Heijden (NED)
15 November	Merksplas	Lucinda Brand (NED)	Aniek van Alphen (NED)	Inge van der Heijden (NED)	Inge van der Heijden (NED)
23 December	Heusden-Zolder	Amandine Fouquenet (FRA)	Blanka Kata Vas (HUN)	Aniek van Alphen (NED)	Aniek van Alphen (NED)
30 December	Diegem	Puck Pieterse (NED)	Marie Schreiber (LUX)	Ceylin del Carmen Alvarado (NED)	Aniek van Alphen (NED)
3 January	Gullegem	Amandine Fouquenet (FRA)	Marion Norbert-Riberolle (BEL)	Rafaelle Carrier (CAN)	Aniek van Alphen (NED)
7 February	Middelkerke	Amandine Fouquenet (FRA)	Ceylin del Carmen Alvarado (NED)	Marie Schreiber (LUX)	Aniek van Alphen (NED)

== See also ==
- 2025–26 UCI Cyclo-cross World Cup
- 2025–26 X²O Badkamers Trophy
- 2025–26 UCI Cyclo-cross season
