= Sara Casasola =

Italian cyclist (born 1999)

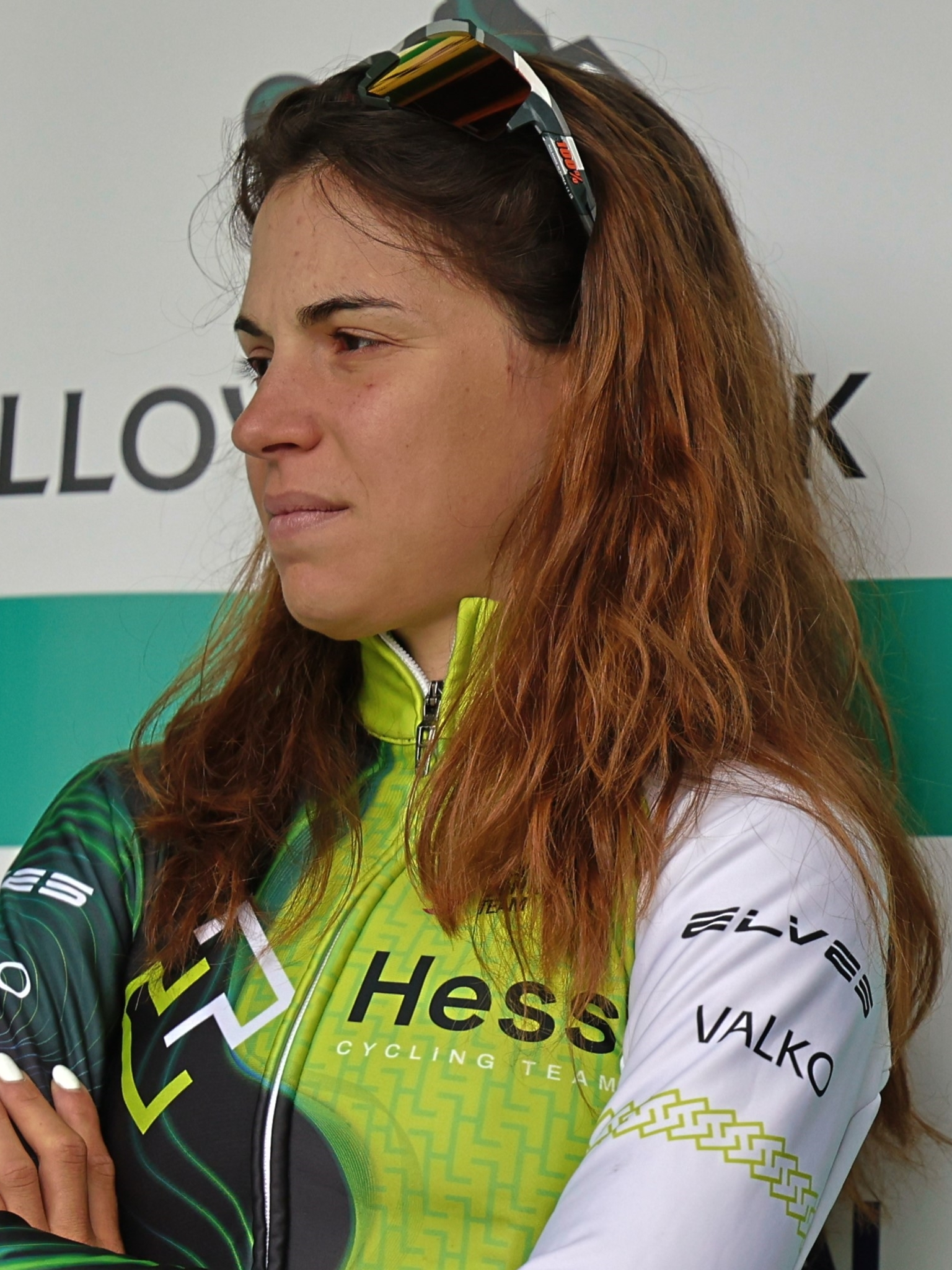
- Casasola at the 2024 Tour of Britain Women

Personal information
- Full name: Sara Casasola
- Born: 29 November 1999 (age 26) San Daniele del Friuli

Cycling career
- Sport: Cycling
- Current team: Fenix–Premier Tech
- Disciplines: Road; Cyclo-cross
- Role: Rider

Professional teams
- 2018–2021: Servetto–Stradalli Cycle–Alurecycling
- 2022–2023: Born to Win G20 Ambedo
- 2024: Hess Cycling Team
- 2025–: Fenix–Deceuninck

Major wins
- Cyclo-cross National Championships (2024, 2026)
Medal record
Women's cyclo-cross
Representing Italy
World Championships
Silver medal – second place	2025 Liévin	Team relay
Silver medal – second place	2026 Hulst	Team relay
European Championships
Bronze medal – third place	2023 Pontchâteau	Elite

Sara Casasola (born 29 November 1999) is an Italian professional racing cyclist, who is a cyclo-cross and road cyclist currently racing for UCI Women's WorldTeam Fenix–Premier Tech in road cycling, and Crelan–Corendon in cyclo-cross. From 2018 to 2021 she rode for the UCI Women's Continental Team Servetto–Makhymo–Beltrami TSA.

== Career ==
Casasola finished in sixth place in the U23 Cyclo-Cross World Championships in 2018, and won the Italian U23 cyclo-cross championships in 2019. Following this, she began competing professionally in 2022, competing in races in Italy and Switzerland, and she began competing regularly in Belgian cyclo-cross races in 2023. She signed for the Crelan-Corendon team in 2024. Following this, she finished in the top 3 in races in Essen and Overijse, and fourth in the European championships. Her run of podium finishes continued throughout the 2024 season.

Casasola won the X2O Trophy Brussels in February 2025, beating Marion Norbert-Riberolle by one second to record her first win of the season. In October 2025, she won the second round of the Superprestige-Overijse, riding solo to victory ahead of Lucinda Brand. However in November 2025 she crashed out of the European Championships, meaning she was unable to compete in races directly following the championships.

== Major results ==
=== Cyclo-cross ===
2016–2017
4th UEC European Under-23 Championships
2018–2019
1st National Under-23 Championships
2019–2020
2nd National Under-23 Championships
2020–2021
Toi Toi Cup

1st Mlada Boleslav
1st Holé Vrchy

3rd National Under-23 Championships
2021–2022
3rd National Championships
2022–2023
5th UEC European Championships
2023–2024
1st National Championships
1st Overall Swiss Cup

1st Steinmaur
1st Schneisingen
1st Hittnau

1st Osoppo
1st Brugherio
1st Fae' Di Oderzo
3rd UEC European Championships
UCI World Cup

4th Troyes
4th Namur
5th Hulst

2024–2025
Exact Cross

2nd Essen
2nd Sint-Niklaas
3rd Maldegem

3rd Overall X²O Badkamers Trophy

1st Brussels
3rd Koppenberg
3rd Lokeren
3rd Hamme

Superprestige

3rd Overijse
3rd Middelkerke

4th UEC European Championships
UCI World Cup

4th Antwerpen

2025–2026
1st National Championships
Superprestige

1st Overijse
2nd Ruddervoorde

UCI World Cup

2nd Tábor
4th Maasmechelen
5th Terralba

Exact Cross

2nd Essen

X²O Badkamers Trophy

3rd Koppenberg
3rd Lokeren

4th UEC European Championships
2026–2027
HG Cross

1st Lokeren

X²O Trophy

1st Beringen
2nd Koppenberg
2nd Hamme–Zogge

Superprestige

2nd Niel
3rd Merksplas

=== Road ===
2023
1st Mountains classification, Tour de Feminin
7th Overall Trofeo Ponente in Rosa
10th Gran Premio della Liberazione
