= 2021 UCI Cyclo-cross World Championships =

Cyclo-cross championship

- Venue: Ostend, Belgium
- Date: 30 to 31 January 2021
- Coordinates: 51°13′23″N 2°54′02″E
- Events: 6

The 2021 UCI Cyclo-cross World Championships were held from 30 to 31 January 2021 in Ostend, Belgium.

== Medal summary ==
Event	Gold		Silver		Bronze	
Men's events
Men's elite race	Mathieu van der Poel; Netherlands	58' 57"	Wout van Aert; Belgium	+37"	Toon Aerts; Belgium	+1' 24"
Men's under-23 race	Pim Ronhaar; Netherlands	49' 47"	Ryan Kamp; Netherlands	+8"	Timo Kielich; Belgium	+14"
Men's junior race	Cancelled					
Women's events
Women's elite race	Lucinda Brand; Netherlands	46' 53"	Annemarie Worst; Netherlands	+8"	Denise Betsema; Netherlands	+19"
Women's under-23 race	Fem van Empel; Netherlands	36' 59"	Anniek van Alphen; Netherlands	+4"	Kata Blanka Vas; Hungary	+9"
Women's junior race	Cancelled					

=== Medals table ===
* Host nation (Belgium)

Rank	Nation	Gold	Silver	Bronze	Total
1	Netherlands (NED)	4	3	1	8
2	Belgium (BEL)*	0	1	2	3
3	Hungary (HUN)	0	0	1	1
Totals (3 entries)		4	4	4	12
