= Cameron Mason =

British cyclist

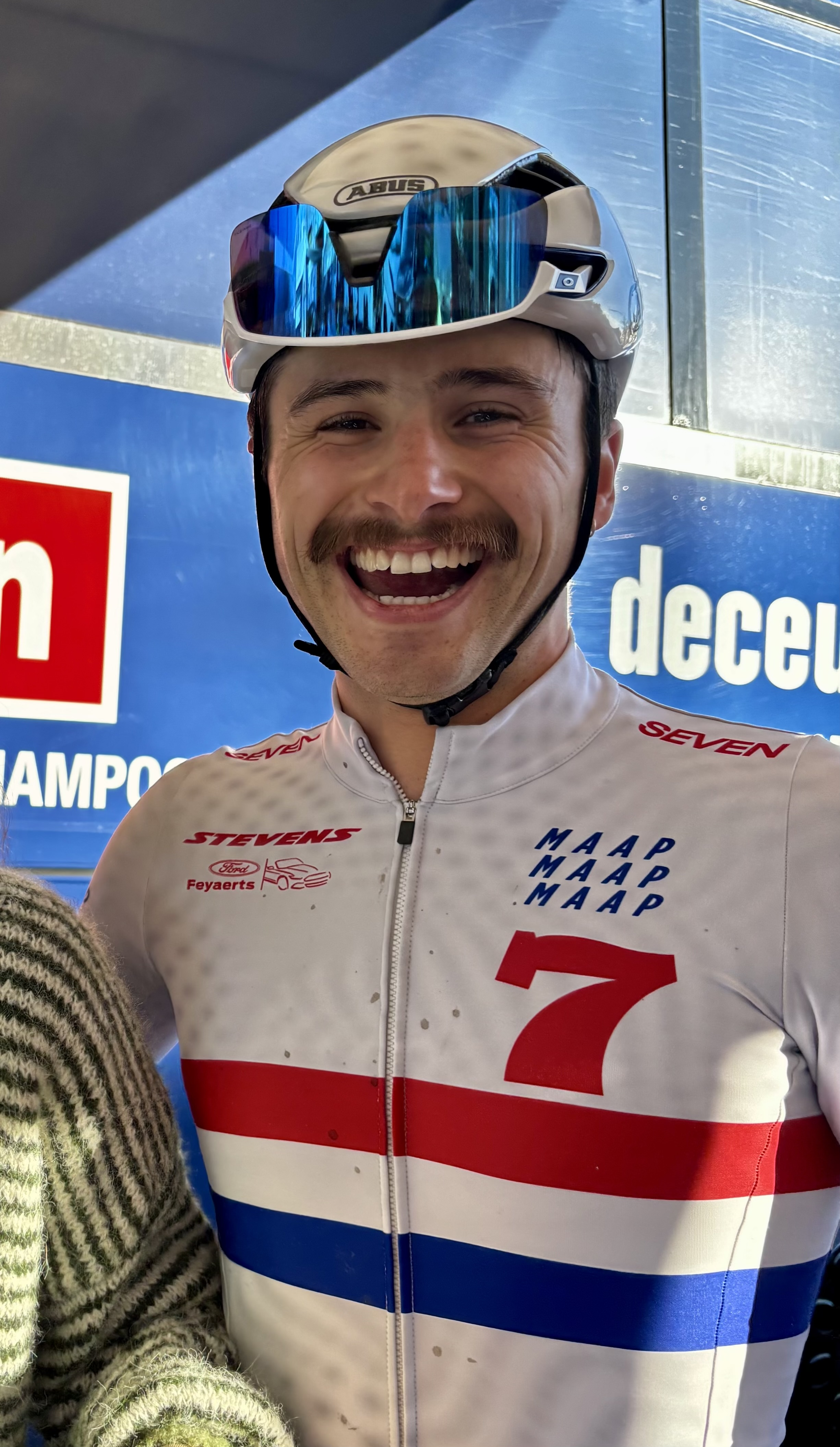
- Cameron Mason at the UCI Cyclocross World Cup in Benidorm January 2025

Personal information
- Full name: Cameron Mason
- Born: 18 August 2000 (age 26) Linlithgow, Scotland

Cycling career
- Sport: Cycling
- Current team: Cyclo-cross Reds
- Disciplines: Cyclo-cross; Road; Mountain biking; Gravel
- Role: Rider

Amateur teams
- 2015–2018: Leslie Bike Shop–Bikers Boutique
- 2018–2019: Endura–Pedal Power

Professional teams
- 2019–2023: Trinity Racing
- 2023–: Cyclo-cross Reds

Major wins
- Cyclo-cross National Championships (2023, 2024, 2025, 2026)
Medal record
Men's cyclo-cross
Representing Great Britain
World Championships
| Silver medal – second place | 2024 Tábor | Team relay |
European Championships
| Silver medal – second place | 2023 Pontchâteau | Elite |
| Bronze medal – third place | 2020 's-Hertogenbosch | Under-23 |

Cameron Mason (born 18 August 2000) is a British cyclist, who competes in cyclo-cross, gravel, road racing and mountain bike. He currently races for UCI cyclo-cross team Seven Racing (formerly Cyclocross Reds) and is part of the development Alpecin–Deceuninck WorldTour Team on the road.

His most notable achievement was coming second in the men's elite race at the UEC European Cyclo-cross Championships in Pontchâteau, France in November 2023. He previously rode for Trinity Racing from 2019 to 2023.

He also runs a YouTube channel where he documents his races and the cyclocross scene.

== Major results ==
=== Cyclo-cross ===
2017–2018
1st Overall Junior National Trophy Series

2nd Shrewsbury
3rd Derby

2018–2019
National Trophy Series

3rd Shrewsbury

2019–2020
3rd National Championships
2020–2021
3rd UEC European Under-23 Championships
2021–2022
1st National Under-23 Championships
UCI Under-23 World Cup

1st Dendermonde
3rd Tábor

National Trophy Series

1st Gravesend

1st Clanfield
2nd National Championships
Under-23 X²O Badkamers Trophy

2nd Koppenberg
2nd Kortrijk
2nd Hamme

5th UCI World Under-23 Championships
2022–2023
1st National Championships
National Trophy Series

1st Falkirk

2023–2024
1st National Championships
2nd UEC European Championships
Superprestige

2nd Boom

Hope Supercross

2nd Houghton-le-Spring
2nd Barnoldswick

2nd Gullegem
2nd Otegem
X²O Badkamers Trophy

3rd Kortrijk

2024–2025
1st National Championships
UCI World Cup

5th Hulst

2025–2026
1st National Championships
Exact Cross

2nd Kortrijk

3rd Overall X²O Badkamers Trophy

2nd Koppenberg
2nd Hamme

UCI World Cup

3rd Flamanville

5th UEC European Championships
2026–2027
Superprestige

1st Niel

HG Cross

3rd Lokeren

=== Gravel ===
2023
UCI World Series

2nd Valkenburg
3rd Berja

2024
1st Scottish National Championships
4th National Championships

=== Mountain bike ===
2018
National Junior XC Series

1st Glentress Forest

3rd Cross-country, National Junior Championships
2022
2nd Overall National XC Series

2nd Tong
2nd Cannock Chase
3rd Fowey

3rd Short track, National Championships
2023
National Championships

1st Marathon
2nd Cross-country

National XCO Series

1st Tong
2nd Margam
2nd Fowey

=== Road ===
2025
1st Circuit race, National Championships
