= Marie Schreiber =

Luxembourgish cyclist (born 2003)

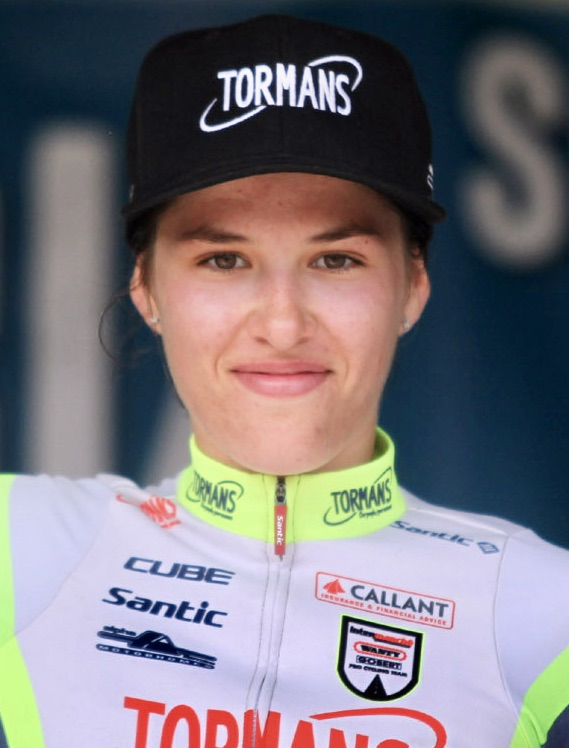
- Schreiber in 2022

Personal information
- Born: 17 April 2003 (age 23) Bettborn, Luxembourg

Cycling career
- Sport: Cycling
- Current team: Team SD Worx–Protime
- Disciplines: Road; Cyclo-cross
- Role: Rider

Amateur team
- 2020: Andy Schleck Cycles–Immo Losch

Professional teams
- 2022–2023: Tormans Cyclo Cross Team
- 2023–: SD Worx

Major wins
- Cyclo-cross National Championships (2023, 2024, 2025, 2026) World Cup 1 individual win (2024–25) Road One-day races and Classics National Road Race Championships (2024) National Time Trial Championships (2024)
Medal record
Women's road cycling
Representing Luxembourg
European Championships
| Bronze medal – third place | 2024 Limburg | Under-23 time trial |
Games of the Small States of Europe
| Gold medal – first place | 2025 Andorra la Vella | Road race |
| Gold medal – first place | 2025 Andorra la Vella | Team road race |
| Gold medal – first place | 2025 Andorra la Vella | Time trial |
Women's cyclo-cross
World Championships
| Silver medal – second place | 2025 Liévin | Under-23 |
European Championships
| Silver medal – second place | 2023 Pontchâteau | Under-23 |
| Silver medal – second place | 2026 Zeddam | Elite |

Marie Schreiber (born 17 April 2003) is a Luxembourgish professional racing cyclist, who currently rides for UCI Women's WorldTeam Team SD Worx–Protime.

== Major results ==
=== Cyclo-cross ===
2019–2020
1st National Junior Championships
2020–2021
UCI Junior World Cup

2nd Tábor

2021–2022
1st National Under-23 Championships
1st Contern
3rd Meulebeke
2022–2023
1st National Championships
1st Lützelbach
1st Bensheim
2nd Loenhout
2nd Brumath
4th UEC European Under-23 Championships
5th UCI World Under-23 Championships
UCI World Cup

5th Dublin

2023–2024
1st Lützelbach
1st Bensheim
1st Brumath
UCI World Cup

2nd Flamanville
4th Dublin
5th Maasmechelen
5th Hoogerheide

2nd UEC European Under-23 Championships
2nd Mechelen
2024–2025
1st National Championships
UCI World Cup

1st Hulst
3rd Antwerpen
3rd Benidorm
5th Namur

Exact Cross

1st Maldegem

Coupe de France

1st Nommay I
1st Nommay II

1st Contern
2nd UCI World Under-23 Championships
2nd UEC European Under-23 Championships
2nd Woerden
Superprestige

3rd Merksplas

2025–2026
1st National Championships
Exact Cross

1st Maldegem

Superprestige

2nd Diegem
3rd Middelkerke

2026–2027
HG Cross

1st Meulebeke

1st Woerden
1st Mechelen
2nd UEC European Championships
X²O Trophy

3rd Koppenberg

=== Mountain bike ===
2021
1st National Junior Championships
2022
1st National Under-23 Championships

=== Road ===
2020
National Junior Championships

1st Road race
1st Time trial

2021
National Junior Championships

1st Road race
1st Time trial

2022
National Under-23 Championships

2nd Road race
2nd Time trial

2023
National Under-23 Championships

1st Road race
2nd Time trial

3rd Road race, National Championships
5th Road race, UEC European Under-23 Championships
2024 (2 pro wins)
National Championships

1st Road race
1st Time trial

3rd Time trial, UEC European Under-23 Championships
8th Overall Baloise Ladies Tour

1st Young rider classification
