= 2024–25 Cyclo-cross Trophy =

Cyclo-cross competition held in Belgium

2024–25 X²O Badkamers Trophy
- Thirty-eighth edition of the Cyclo-cross Trophy

Details
- Dates: 1 November 2024 – 16 February 2025
- Location: Belgium
- Races: 8

Champions
- Male individual champion: Eli Iserbyt (BEL) Elite; Kay De Bruyckere (BEL) U-23
- Female individual champion: Lucinda Brand (NED) Elite

Location of Cyclo-cross Trophy races in 2024-25.

The 2024–25 Cyclo-cross Trophy, also known as the X²O Badkamers Trophy, was a season-long cyclo-cross competition held in Belgium.

== Calendar ==
The competition consisted of 8 events between 1 November 2024 and 16 February 2025.

#	Date	Race	Location	Class
1	1 November	Koppenbergcross	(Belgium) Oudenaarde	C1
2	10 November	Rapencross	(Belgium) Lokeren	C2
3	17 November	Flandriencross	(Belgium) Hamme	C1
4	14 December	Herentals Crosst	(Belgium) Herentals	C2
5	1 January	GP Sven Nys	(Belgium) Baal	C1
6	3 January	Duinencross Koksijde	(Belgium) Koksijde	C1
7	9 February	Krawatencross	(Belgium) Lille	C1
8	16 February	Brussels Universities Cyclocross	(Belgium) Brussels	C1

== Results ==
=== Elite Men ===
Date	Race	Winner	Second	Third	Competition leader
1 November	Koppenbergcross Oudenaarde	Lars van der Haar (NED)	Eli Iserbyt (BEL)	Toon Aerts (BEL)	Lars van der Haar (NED)
10 November	Rapencross Lokeren	Thibau Nys (BEL)	Niels Vandeputte (BEL)	Jente Michels (BEL)	Lars van der Haar (NED)
17 November	Flandriencross Hamme	Niels Vandeputte (BEL)	Eli Iserbyt (BEL)	Felipe Orts Lloret (ESP)	Lars van der Haar (NED)
14 December	Herentals Crosst	Michael Vanthourenhout (BEL)	Pim Ronhaar (NED)	Laurens Sweeck (BEL)	Eli Iserbyt (BEL)
1 January	GP Sven Nys	Eli Iserbyt (BEL)	Pim Ronhaar (NED)	Emiel Verstrynge (BEL)	Eli Iserbyt (BEL)
3 January	Duinencross Koksijde	Laurens Sweeck (BEL)	Tibor Del Grosso (NED)	Toon Aerts (BEL)	Eli Iserbyt (BEL)
9 February	Krawatencross Lille	Laurens Sweeck (BEL)	Toon Aerts (BEL)	Eli Iserbyt (BEL)	Eli Iserbyt (BEL)
16 February	Brussels Universities Cyclocross	Michael Vanthourenhout (BEL)	Joris Nieuwenhuis (NED)	Lars van der Haar (NED)	Eli Iserbyt (BEL)

=== Elite Women ===
Date	Race	Winner	Second	Third	Competition leader
1 November	Koppenbergcross Oudenaarde	Fem van Empel (NED)	Lucinda Brand (NED)	Sara Casasola (ITA)	Fem van Empel (NED)
10 November	Rapencross Lokeren	Lucinda Brand (NED)	Ceylin del Carmen Alvarado (NED)	Sara Casasola (ITA)	Lucinda Brand (NED)
17 November	Flandriencross Hamme	Ceylin del Carmen Alvarado (NED)	Lucinda Brand (NED)	Sara Casasola (ITA)	Lucinda Brand (NED)
14 December	Herentals Crosst	Fem van Empel (NED)	Lucinda Brand (NED)	Ceylin del Carmen Alvarado (NED)	Lucinda Brand (NED)
1 January	GP Sven Nys	Fem van Empel (NED)	Lucinda Brand (NED)	Puck Pieterse (NED)	Lucinda Brand (NED)
3 January	Duinencross Koksijde	Puck Pieterse (NED)	Lucinda Brand (NED)	Fem van Empel (NED)	Lucinda Brand (NED)
9 February	Krawatencross Lille	Lucinda Brand (NED)	Inge van der Heijden (NED)	Manon Bakker (NED)	Lucinda Brand (NED)
16 February	Brussels Universities Cyclocross	Sara Casasola (ITA)	Marion Norbert-Riberolle (BEL)	Lucinda Brand (NED)	Lucinda Brand (NED)

=== Under-23 Men ===
Date	Race	Winner	Second	Third	Competition leader
1 November	Koppenbergcross Oudenaarde	Viktor Vandenberghe (BEL)	Sil De Brauwere (BEL)	Kenay De Moyer (BEL)	Viktor Vandenberghe (BEL)
10 November	Rapencross Lokeren	David Haverdings (NED)	Kay De Bruyckere (BEL)	Guus Van Den Eijnden (NED)	Sil De Brauwere (BEL)
17 November	Flandriencross Hamme	Yordi Corsus (BEL)	Guus Van Den Eijnden (NED)	David Haverdings (NED)	Sil De Brauwere (BEL)
14 December	Herentals Crosst	Tibor Del Grosso (NED)	Kay De Bruyckere (BEL)	David Haverdings (NED)	David Haverdings (NED)
1 January	GP Sven Nys	Kay De Bruyckere (BEL)	Yordi Corsus (BEL)	Seppe Van Den Boer (BEL)	Kay De Bruyckere (BEL)
3 January	Duinencross Koksijde	Kay De Bruyckere (BEL)	Yordi Corsus (BEL)	Keije Solen (NED)	Kay De Bruyckere (BEL)
9 February	Krawatencross Lille	Yordi Corsus (BEL)	Guus Van Den Eijnden (NED)	Kay De Bruyckere (BEL)	Kay De Bruyckere (BEL)
16 February	Brussels Universities Cyclocross	Kay De Bruyckere (BEL)	Yordi Corsus (BEL)	Guus Van Den Eijnden (NED)	Kay De Bruyckere (BEL)

== See also ==
- 2024–25 UCI Cyclo-cross World Cup
- 2024–25 Cyclo-cross Superprestige
- 2024–25 UCI Cyclo-cross season
