= 2009 UCI Cyclo-cross World Championships – Men's junior race =

Men's Junior Cyclo-cross Race
2009 UCI Cyclo-cross World Championships
- Rainbow jersey

Race details
- Dates: January 31, 2009
- Stages: 1
- Winning time: 40' 06"

Medalists
	Gold	Tijmen Eising (NED)
	Silver	Corne Van Kessel (NED)
	Bronze	Alexandre Billon (FRA)

This event was held on Saturday 31 January 2009 as part of the 2009 UCI Cyclo-cross World Championships in Hoogerheide, Netherlands.

== Ranking ==
Rank	Cyclist	Time
Gold medal	Tijmen Eising (NED)	40:06
Silver medal	Corne Van Kessel (NED)	+ 0:25
Bronze medal	Alexandre Billon (FRA)	+ 0:25
4	Wietse Bosmans (BEL)	+ 0:25
5	Lars Van Der Haar (NED)	+ 0:25
6	Luca Braidot (ITA)	+ 0:26
7	Jan Nesvadba (CZE)	+ 0:26
8	Daniele Braidot (ITA)	+ 0:26
9	Sean De Bie (BEL)	+ 0:26
10	Michiel van der Heijden (NED)	+ 0:26
11	Emilien Viennet (FRA)	+ 0:27
12	Vinnie Braet (BEL)	+ 0:28
13	Luke Keough (USA)	+ 0:40
14	Daniele Dall'Oste (ITA)	+ 0:43
15	Matej Lasak (CZE)	+ 0:44
16	Jimmy Turgis (FRA)	+ 0:44
17	Bryan Falaschi (ITA)	+ 0:48
18	David Van Der Poel (NED)	+ 1:09
19	Zach Mc Donald (USA)	+ 1:18
20	Pierre Garson (FRA)	+ 1:19
21	Enno Quast (GER)	+ 1:26
22	Valentin Hadoux (FRA)	+ 1:26
23	Gianni Vermeersch (BEL)	+ 1:28
24	Matej Medved (SVK)	+ 1:29
25	Michael Boros (CZE)	+ 1:29
26	Radek Polnicky (CZE)	+ 1:30
27	Anthony Grand (SUI)	+ 1:44
28	Chris Wallace (USA)	+ 1:44
29	Yannick Mayer (GER)	+ 1:44
30	Gavin Mannion (USA)	+ 1:45
31	Ismael Felix Barba (ESP)	+ 1:46
32	Thomas Moses (GBR)	+ 1:50
33	Tomas Paprstka (CZE)	+ 2:00
34	Andrzej Bartkiewicz (POL)	+ 2:16
35	Jannick Geisler (GER)	+ 2:17
36	Kenneth Hansen (DEN)	+ 2:19
37	Inigo Gomez Elorriaga (ESP)	+ 2:19
38	Eric Emsky (USA)	+ 2:22
39	Bart De Vocht (BEL)	+ 2:26
40	Daniel McLay (GBR)	+ 2:31
41	Rudy Lorenzon (ITA)	+ 2:32
42	Toni Bretschneider (GER)	+ 2:36
43	Michael (Jr) Schweizer (GER)	+ 2:37
44	Bob Jungels (LUX)	+ 2:38
45	Sam Harrison (GBR)	+ 3:06
46	Josep Nadal Magrinya (ESP)	+ 3:15
47	Dario Stauble (SUI)	+ 3:32
48	Bartosz Pilis (POL)	+ 3:51
49	Eduard-Michael Grosu (ROU)	+ 6:39
50	Oliver Webster (GBR)	+ 7:23
