= Felipe Orts =

Spanish cyclist (born 1995)

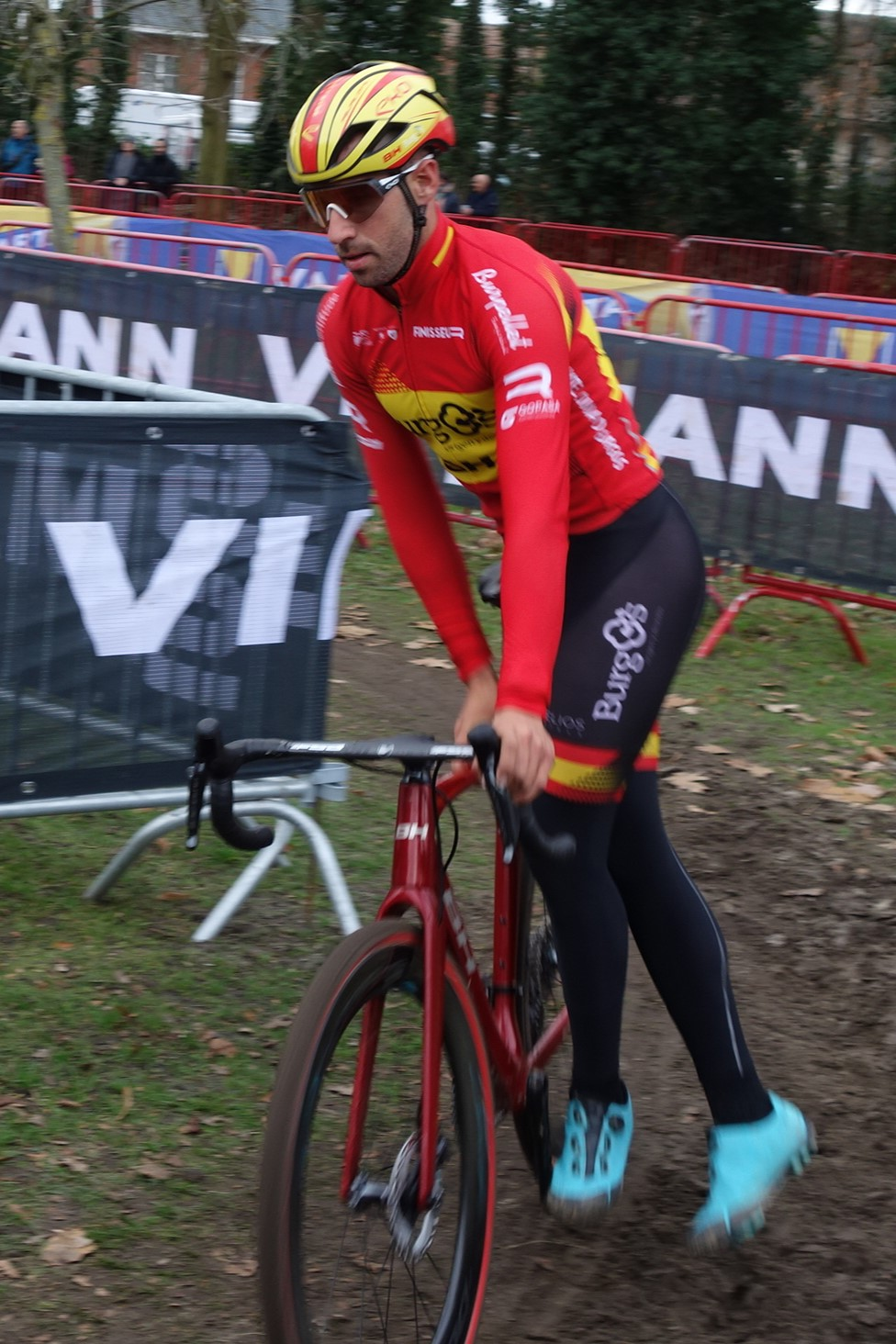
- Orts in 2023

Personal information
- Full name: Felipe Orts Lloret
- Born: 1 April 1995 (age 31) Villajoyosa, Spain
- Height: 1.79 m (5 ft 10 in)
- Weight: 70 kg (154 lb)

Cycling career
- Sport: Cycling
- Current team: La Vila Joiosa–Neteo
- Disciplines: Cyclo-cross; Road
- Role: Rider

Amateur teams
- 2013: GAC Bikes–Moixent Forestal
- 2014–2018: GSport–Valencia Terra i Mar

Professional teams
- 2018–2019: Delikia–Ginestar (cyclo-cross)
- 2019–2021: Teika–GSport–BH
- 2021–2023: Burgos BH (road)
- 2024–2025: La Vila Joiosa–Neteo (cyclo-cross)
- 2025-: Ridley Racing Team
Medal record
Representing Spain
Men's cyclo-cross
World Championships
Silver medal – second place	2017 Bieles	Men's under-23 race
European Championships
Silver medal – second place	2024 Pontevedra	Elite

Felipe Orts Lloret (born April 1, 1995) is a Spanish road and cyclo-cross cyclist, who currently rides for La Vila Joiosa–Neteo in cyclo-cross. He finished second at the men's under-23 event at the 2017 UCI Cyclo-cross World Championships.

For the 2021 road racing season, Orts joined the Burgos BH team on a one-year contract; he remained with Teika–BH–GSport in cyclo-cross events. For the 2025–2026 season, Orts signed with Ridley Racing Team

== Major results ==
=== Cyclo-cross ===
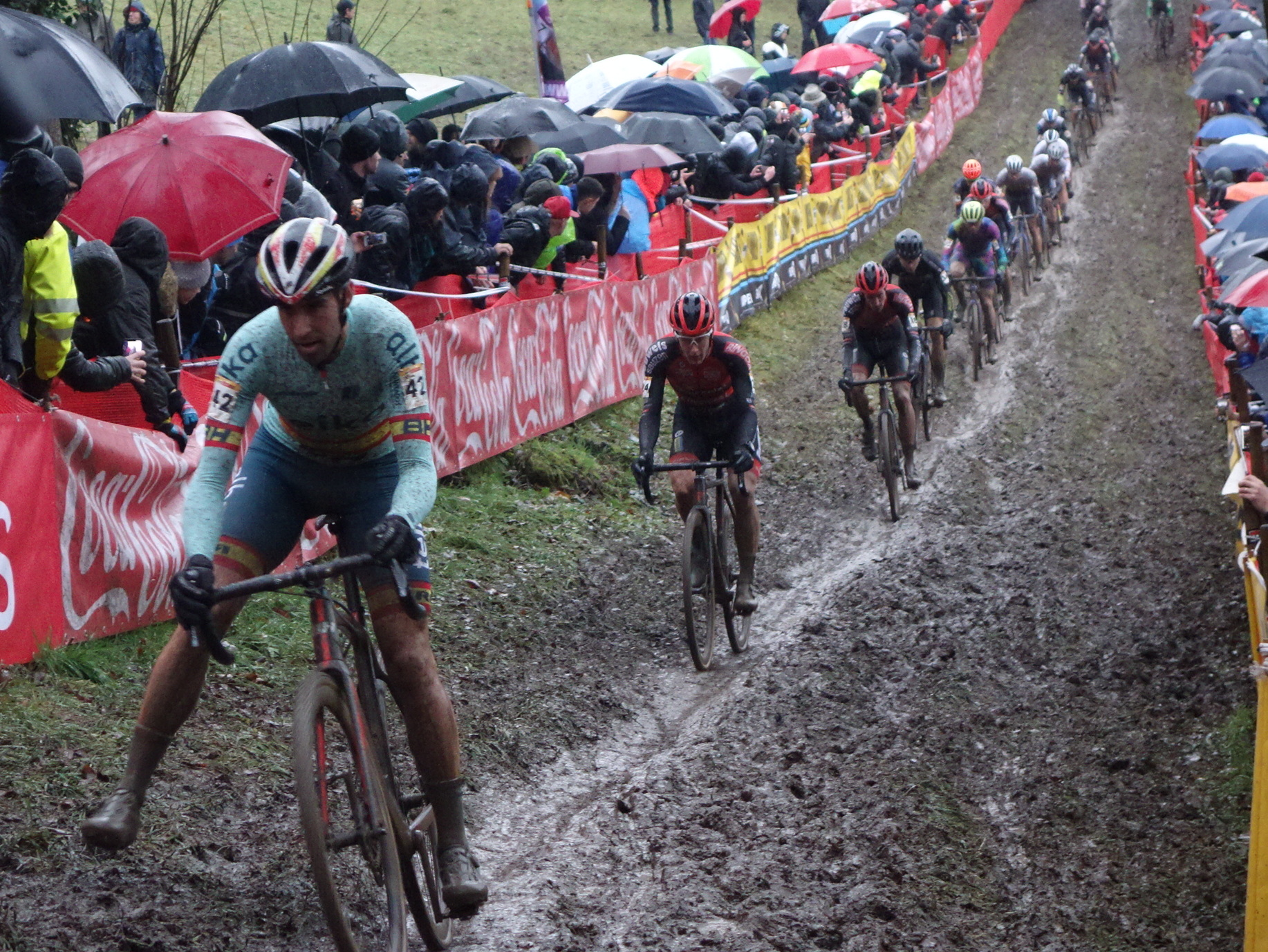
Orts (left) at the Citadelcross Namur in 2019.

2012–2013
1st National Junior Championships
2014–2015
2nd National Under-23 Championships
2nd Valencia
2015–2016
1st National Under-23 Championships
1st Les Franqueses del Valles
1st Valencia
2016–2017
1st National Under-23 Championships
2nd UCI World Under-23 Championships
2017–2018
1st Overall Copa de España

1st Laudio
1st Elorrio

1st Manlleu
1st Valencia
1st Abadino
1st Utsunomiya
2nd National Championships
2nd Les Franqueses del Valles
2018–2019
1st National Championships
1st Overall Copa de España

1st Laudio
2nd Elorrio
2nd Karrantza

1st Marin-Pontevedra
1st Vic
1st Abadino
1st Ametzaga Zuia
Utsunomiya

1st Day 2
2nd Day 1

3rd Manlleu
2019–2020
1st National Championships
Copa de España

1st Laudio
1st Elorrio

1st Vic
1st Manlleu
1st Les Franqueses del Valles
2nd Overall EKZ CrossTour

2nd Aigle

3rd Waterloo
3rd Iowa City
3rd Woerden
2020–2021
1st National Championships
1st Overall Copa de España

1st Sueca
1st Xàtiva
1st Valencia

EKZ CrossTour

3rd Bern

2021–2022
1st National Championships
1st Contern
1st Marin-Pontevedra
1st Elorrio
1st Xàtiva
Ethias Cross

3rd Leuven

Copa de España

3rd Pontevedra

2022–2023
1st National Championships
Copa de España

1st Xativa
2nd Pontevedra

1st As Pontes de Garcia Rodriguez
2nd Ardooie
2nd Sanxenxo
3rd Marín
2023–2024
1st National Championships
1st Tarazona
1st Melgaço
1st Xaxancx
Copa de España

1st Xàtiva
2nd Pontevedra
2nd As Pontes

2nd Ribadumia
Superprestige

3rd Niel

Exact Cross

3rd Loenhout

UCI World Cup

5th Maasmechelen

2024–2025
1st Rucphen
2nd UEC European Championships
UCI World Cup

2nd Hulst
3rd Dublin

Superprestige

2nd Niel

X²O Badkamers Trophy

3rd Hamme

2025–2026
1st National Championships
1st Woerden
X²O Badkamers Trophy

2nd Lille

UCI World Cup

3rd Benidorm
5th Maasmechelen

Exact Cross

3rd Mol
3rd Maldegem

2026–2027
Superprestige

3rd Merksplas
