= 2022–23 Cyclo-cross Superprestige =

Cyclo-cross competition held in Belgium and the Netherlands

Details
- Location: Belgium
- Races: 8

Champions
- Male individual champion: Lars van der Haar (NED) (Baloise–Trek Lions)
- Female individual champion: Ceylin del Carmen Alvarado (NED) (Alpecin–Deceuninck)

The 2022–23 Cyclo-cross Superprestige – also known as the Telenet Superprestige for sponsorship reasons – was a season-long cyclo-cross competition held in Belgium.

== Calendar ==
=== Men's competition ===
Date	Race	Winner	Team	Competition leader
29 October	Ruddervoorde	Eli Iserbyt (BEL)	Pauwels Sauzen–Bingoal	Eli Iserbyt (BEL)
11 November	Niel	Laurens Sweeck (BEL)	Crelan-Fristads	Laurens Sweeck (BEL)
19 November	Merksplas	Laurens Sweeck (BEL)	Crelan-Fristads	Laurens Sweeck (BEL)
3 December	Boom	Tom Pidcock (GBR)	Ineos Grenadiers	Laurens Sweeck (BEL)
27 December	Heusen-Zolder	Wout van Aert (BEL)	Team Jumbo–Visma	Lars van der Haar (NED)
28 December	Diegem	Wout van Aert (BEL)	Team Jumbo–Visma	Lars van der Haar (NED)
7 January	Gullegem	Wout van Aert (BEL)	Team Jumbo–Visma	Lars van der Haar (NED)
11 February	Middelkerke	Eli Iserbyt (BEL)	Pauwels Sauzen–Bingoal	Lars van der Haar (NED)

=== Women's competition ===
Date	Race	Winner	Team	Competition leader
29 October	Ruddervoorde	Denise Betsema (NED)	Pauwels Sauzen–Bingoal	Denise Betsema (NED)
11 November	Niel	Ceylin del Carmen Alvarado (NED)	Alpecin–Deceuninck	Denise Betsema (NED)
19 November	Merksplas	Ceylin del Carmen Alvarado (NED)	Alpecin–Deceuninck	Ceylin del Carmen Alvarado (NED)
3 December	Boom	Aniek van Alphen (NED)	777	Denise Betsema (NED)
27 December	Heusen-Zolder	Ceylin del Carmen Alvarado (NED)	Alpecin–Deceuninck	Denise Betsema (NED)
28 December	Diegem	Puck Pieterse (NED)	Alpecin–Deceuninck	Ceylin del Carmen Alvarado (NED)
7 January	Gullegem	Ceylin del Carmen Alvarado (NED)	Alpecin–Deceuninck	Ceylin del Carmen Alvarado (NED)
11 February	Middelkerke	Ceylin del Carmen Alvarado (NED)	Alpecin–Deceuninck	Ceylin del Carmen Alvarado (NED)
