= Niels Vandeputte =

Belgian cyclist

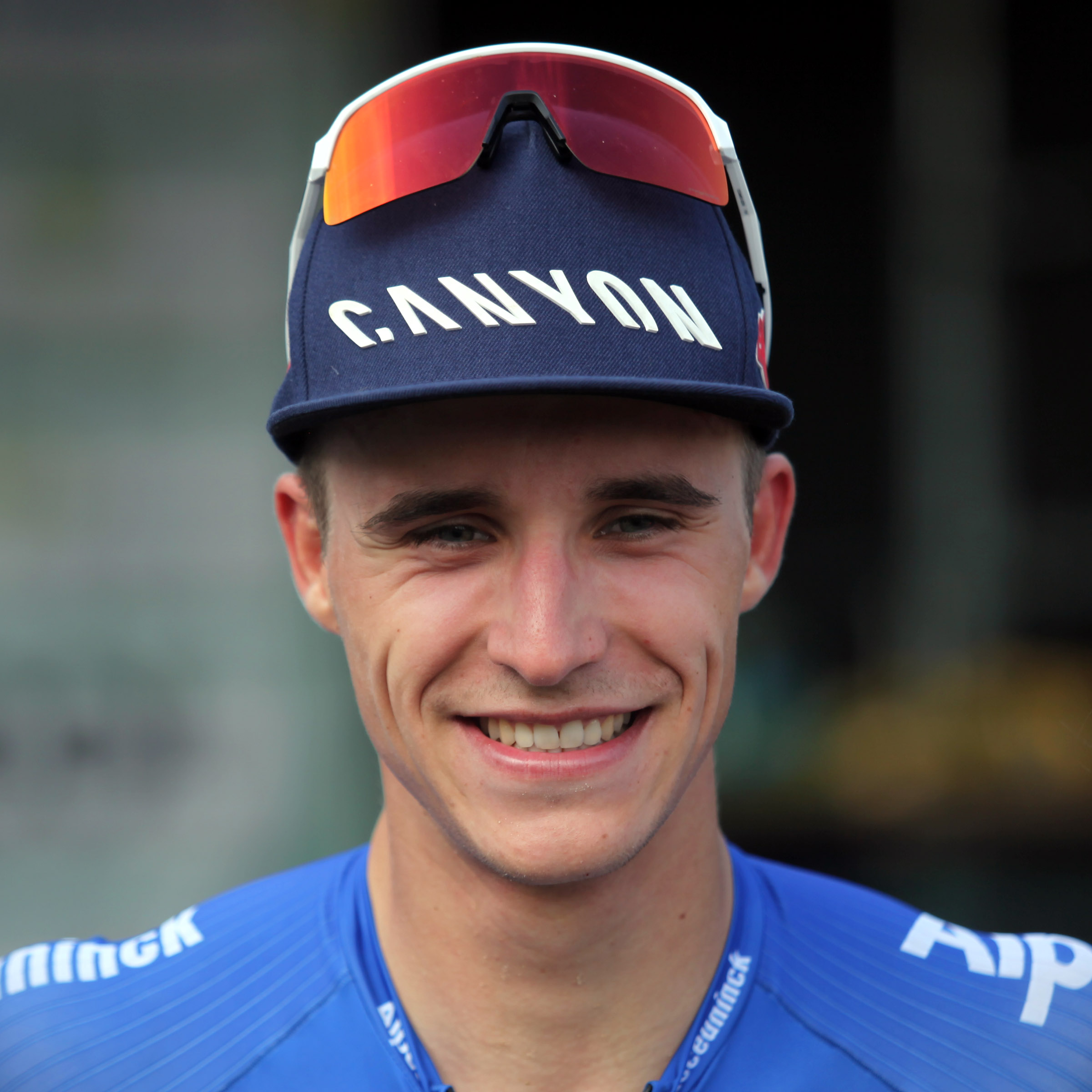
- Niels Vandeputte in Bensheim 2022

Personal information
- Born: 19 September 2000 (age 26) Brecht, Belgium

Cycling career
- Sport: Cycling
- Current team: Alpecin–Premier Tech Development Team
- Disciplines: Road; Cyclo-cross; Mountain biking
- Role: Rider

Amateur teams
- 2016–2020: IKO Enertherm–Beobank (road)
- 2020: Alpecin–Fenix (road; stagiaire)

Professional teams
- 2019–2020: Corendon–Circus (cyclo-cross)
- 2021–: Alpecin–Fenix Development Team

Major wins
- Cyclo-cross World Cup 1 individual win (2024–25) Superprestige (2024–25, 2025–26)
Medal record
Men's cyclo-cross
World Championships
Bronze medal – third place	2026 Hulst	Team relay
European Championships
Bronze medal – third place	2026 Zeddam	Elite

Niels Vandeputte (born 19 September 2000) is a Belgian cyclist, who currently rides for UCI Continental team Alpecin–Premier Tech Development Team. He won the prestigious Under-23 Duinencross Koksijde in 2019.

== Major results ==
=== Cyclo-cross ===
2016–2017
1st Junior Rucphen
Junior DVV Trophy

2nd Essen
2nd Loenhout
3rd Hamme

Junior Soudal Classics

2nd Neerpelt
2nd Mol

Junior Superprestige

3rd Ruddervoorde

2017–2018
UCI Junior World Cup

1st Hoogerheide
3rd Heusden-Zolder

Junior Superprestige

1st Middelkerke
2nd Hoogstraten
3rd Ruddervoorde

Junior DVV Trophy

1st Lille

1st Junior Oostmalle
1st Junior Brabant
Junior Soudal Classics

2nd Mol

Junior Brico Cross

3rd Hulst

3rd National Junior Championships
2018–2019
Under-23 DVV Trophy

1st Antwerpen
2nd Lille

1st Under-23 Gullegem
Under-23 Brico Cross

2nd Hulst

2nd Under-23 Oostmalle
3rd National Under-23 Championships
2019–2020
UCI Under-23 World Cup

1st Koksijde
3rd Hoogerheide

3rd Overall Under-23 DVV Trophy

1st Hamme
1st Kortrijk
1st Lille

2nd National Under-23 Championships
2020–2021
X²O Badkamers Trophy

3rd Brussels

2021–2022
2nd UEC European Under-23 Championships
X²O Badkamers Trophy

2nd Lille

UCI Under-23 World Cup

2nd Namur

2022–2023
1st Bensheim
UCI World Cup

2nd Val di Sole
5th Maasmechelen
5th Besançon

2nd Lützelbach
3rd Oostmalle
2023–2024
X²O Badkamers Trophy

1st Lille

1st Heerde
1st Oostmalle
3rd Overall Superprestige

3rd Merksplas

5th Overall UCI World Cup

2nd Val di Sole
4th Maasmechelen
5th Flamanville

Exact Cross

3rd Mol
3rd Maldegem

2024–2025
1st Overall Superprestige

2nd Ruddervoorde
2nd Diegem
3rd Niel
3rd Middelkerke

UCI World Cup

1st Hulst
5th Antwerpen

X²O Badkamers Trophy

1st Hamme
2nd Lokeren

Exact Cross

1st Sint-Niklaas
2nd Essen
3rd Beringen
3rd Maldegem

1st Brumath
4th UEC European Championships
2025–2026
1st Overall Superprestige

1st Gullegem
2nd Niel
2nd Merksplas
2nd Middelkerke
3rd Ruddervoorde

Exact Cross

1st Kortrijk
1st Maldegem
1st Sint-Niklaas

2nd Overall X²O Badkamers Trophy

1st Lille
2nd Loenhout
2nd Brussels
3rd Lokeren
3rd Hofstade

3rd Overall UCI World Cup

3rd Koksijde
3rd Maasmechelen
3rd Hoogerheide
4th Flamanville
4th Zonhoven
5th Terralba
5th Antwerpen
5th Dendermonde
5th Benidorm

3rd Otegem
2026–2027
Superprestige

1st Merksplas

X²O Trophy

2nd Hamme–Zogge

3rd UEC European Championships

=== Road ===
2024
1st Puivelde Koerse
1st Stage 3 Kreiz Breizh Elites
6th Omloop van het Waasland
2025
4th Midden-Brabant Poort Omloop
5th Overall Kreiz Breizh Elites
6th Grand Prix de la ville de Pérenchies

=== Mountain bike ===
2018
1st Cross-country, National Junior Championships
1st Junior Kluisbergen
2nd Junior Eupen
2019
3rd Cross-country, National Under-23 Championships
3rd Apeldoorn

=== Gravel ===
2025
1st National Championships
UCI World Series

1st Aachen

2026
UCI World Series

2nd Valkenburg

3rd UEC European Championships
