= Ryan Kamp =

Dutch cyclist (born 2000)

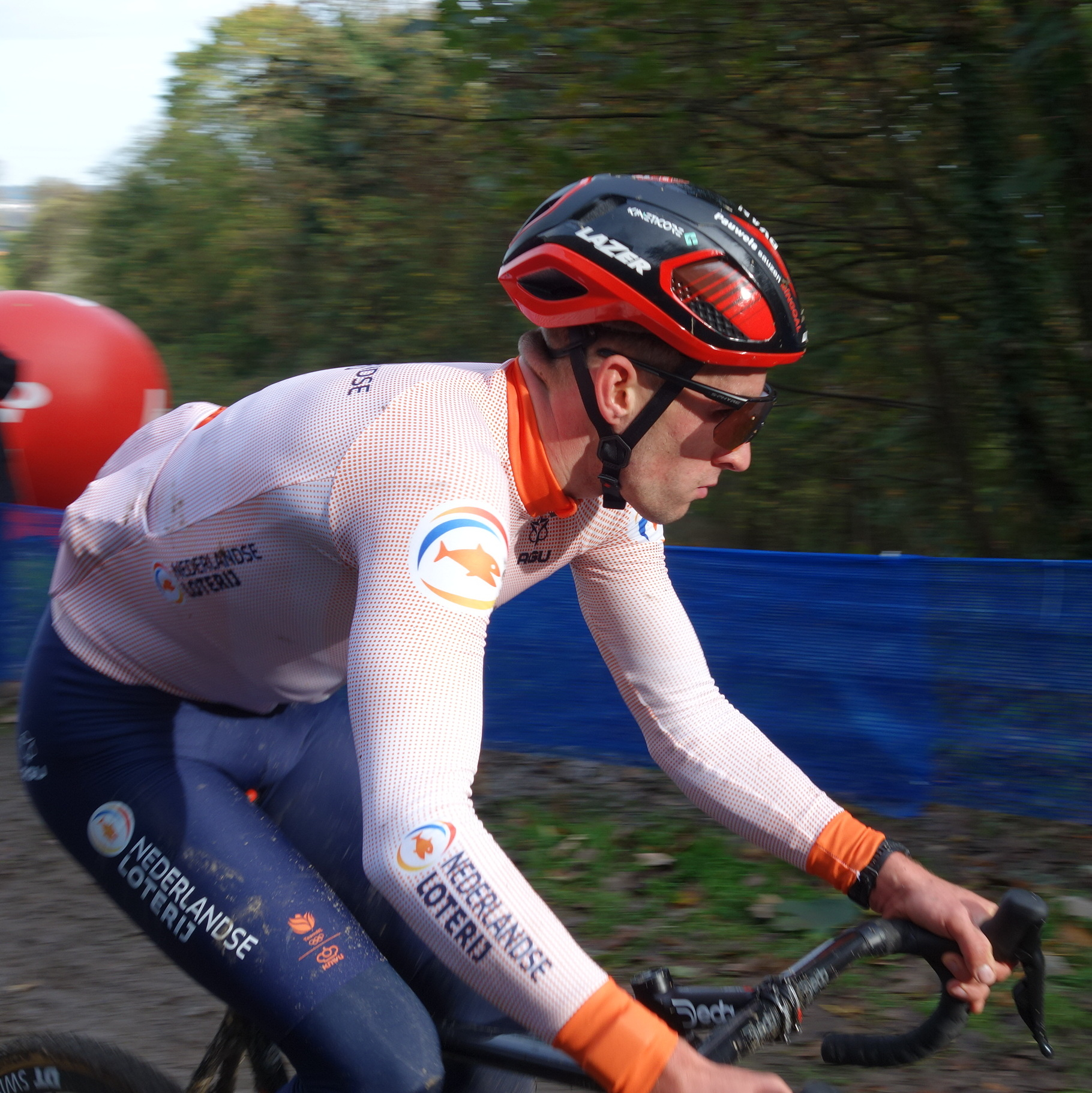

Personal information
- Full name: Ryan Kamp
- Born: 12 December 2000 (age 25) Heerenveen, Netherlands
- Height: 1.78 m (5 ft 10 in)
- Weight: 69 kg (152 lb)

Cycling career
- Sport: Cycling
- Current team: Pauwels Sauzen–Altez Industriebouw Cycling Team
- Disciplines: Cyclo-cross; Road
- Role: Rider

Professional team
- 2019–: Pauwels Sauzen–Bingoal
Medal record
Men's cyclo-cross
Representing the Netherlands
World Championships
Gold medal – first place	2020 Dübendorf	Under-23
Gold medal – first place	2023 Hoogerheide	Team relay
Silver medal – second place	2021 Ostend	Under-23
Bronze medal – third place	2018 Valkenburg	Junior
European Championships
Gold medal – first place	2020 's-Hertogenbosch	Under-23

Ryan Kamp (born 12 December 2000) is a Dutch cyclo-cross and road cyclist, who currently rides for UCI Continental team Pauwels Sauzen–Altez Industriebouw Cycling Team. As a junior, he won the silver medal at the 2018 UCI Cyclo-cross World Championships. He won the gold medal in the men's under-23 event at the 2020 UCI Cyclo-cross World Championships in Dübendorf.

== Major results ==
=== Cyclo-cross ===
2016–2017
2nd National Junior Championships
2nd Junior Oostmalle
Junior Brico Cross

2nd Hulst
3rd Bredene

Junior Superprestige

3rd Hoogstraten

Junior DVV Trophy

3rd Essen

2017–2018
1st National Junior Championships
UCI Junior World Cup

2nd Namur
2nd Koksijde

2nd Overall Junior Superprestige

1st Hoogstraten
1st Ruddervoorde
1st Gieten
2nd Diegem

Junior DVV Trophy

2nd Lille
3rd Loenhout
3rd Essen

Junior Brico Cross

1st Eeklo

1st Junior Rucphen
2nd Junior Oostmalle
2nd Junior Brabant
3rd UCI World Junior Championships
2018–2019
1st National Under-23 Championships
2nd Under-23 Gullegem
3rd Under-23 Oostmalle
2019–2020
1st UCI World Under-23 Championships
1st National Under-23 Championships
2nd Overall UCI Under-23 World Cup

1st Hoogerheide
1st Nommay
2nd Namur
2nd Bern
3rd Koksijde

Under-23 DVV Trophy

1st Brussels
1st Ronse
2nd Hamme
2nd Koppenberg
3rd Lille

2nd Vittel
3rd Boulzicourt
2020–2021
1st UEC European Under-23 Championships
2nd UCI World Under-23 Championships
2021–2022
1st UEC European Under-23 Championships
UCI Under-23 World Cup

2nd Tábor
2nd Flamanville

2022–2023
1st Team relay, UCI World Championships
Copa de España

1st Pontevedra

1st Oisterwijk
1st Marín
Exact Cross

2nd Zonnebeke

3rd National Championships
3rd Maldegem
3rd Woerden
2023–2024
1st Rucphen
5th UEC European Championships
UCI World Cup

5th Troyes

2025–2026
Exact Cross

3rd Kortrijk

UCI World Cup

4th Terralba
