= 2013 UCI Cyclo-cross World Championships – Men's elite race =

Men's elite Cyclo-cross race
2013 UCI Cyclo-cross World Championships
- Rainbow jersey

Race details
- Dates: 2 February 2013
- Stages: 1
- Distance: 25.14 km (15.62 mi)
- Winning time: 1 hr 05' 35"

Medalists
	Gold	Sven Nys (Belgium)
	Silver	Klaas Vantornout (Belgium)
	Bronze	Lars van der Haar (Netherlands)

This event was held on 2 February 2013 as part of the 2013 UCI Cyclo-cross World Championships in Louisville, Kentucky, United States. Belgian Sven Nys took home the gold for the second time in his career, a few seconds ahead of Klaas Vantornout, another Belgian. In the background, Lars van der Haar of the Netherlands managed to secure a third spot in his first year with the elite men.

== Race report ==
The race started with some outsiders hoping for a lucky break, after one lap Martin Bína from Czech Republic, Francis Mourey from France and Marco Aurelio Fontana from Italy were the first three to cross the line. A mere lap further Mourey had even created a lead on the favourites. Slowly but surely those favourites, all Belgians, caught up with Mourey. Halfway into the race there was a lead group consisting of Mourey and the Belgians Kevin Pauwels, Klaas Vantornout and Sven Nys. 2012 world champion Niels Albert trailed shortly behind that group, but never really managed to catch up.

Lap six saw the end of Pauwels' chances for the rainbow jersey. Twice his chain gave him troubles and he dropped back to the 15th spot. Mourey shared his luck and suffered a flat tire. Suddenly only Nys and Vantornout were left to compete for the gold. They kept an even match, though Nys showed he should be feared by 'flying' over the barriers every lap again, creating a small gap each time. In the last lap, as Nys grabbed the lead to go up the limestone steps. Vantornout, in his haste to keep up, turned too sharply into a corner and got stuck in the sidelines of the track. Vantornout only lost about a second, but Nys went for his chance and gave it his all. With that tiny lead he hopped quickly over the barriers again, sealing Vantornout's fate.

In the back it long looked like Albert would be completing the podium, but the young Dutchman Lars van der Haar rode an impressive race and got the fifth medal for Netherlands in the 2013 World Championships. Albert dropped away completely to an eight spot. Bart Wellens of Belgium unexpectedly managed to grab the fourth spot.

== Results ==
Rank	Cyclist	Time
Gold medal	Sven Nys (BEL)	1h 05' 35"
Silver medal	Klaas Vantornout (BEL)	+ 2"
Bronze medal	Lars van der Haar (NED)	+ 25"
4	Bart Wellens (BEL)	+ 41"
5	Philipp Walsleben (GER)	+ 44"
6	Julien Taramarcaz (SUI)	+ 44"
7	Radomír Šimůnek (CZE)	+ 1' 15"
8	Niels Albert (BEL)	+ 1' 19"
9	Thijs van Amerongen (NED)	+ 1' 31"
10	Martin Bína (CZE)	+ 1' 41"
11	Francis Mourey (FRA)	+ 1' 54"
12	Kevin Pauwels (BEL)	+ 2' 04"
13	Simon Zahner (SUI)	+ 2' 36"
14	Enrico Franzoi (ITA)	+ 2' 38"
15	Bart Aernouts (BEL)	+ 2' 48"
16	Marcel Meisen (GER)	+ 2' 54"
17	Lukas Flückiger (SUI)	+ 3' 04"
18	Rob Peeters (BEL)	+ 3' 16"
19	Tim Johnson (USA)	+ 3' 20"
20	Arnaud Grand (SUI)	+ 3' 32"
21	Marcel Wildhaber (SUI)	+ 3' 38"
22	Jonathan Page (USA)	+ 3' 42"
23	Aitor Hernández (ESP)	+ 3' 58"
24	Geoff Kabush (CAN)	+ 4' 06"
25	Jeremy Powers (USA)	+ 4' 16"
26	Marco Aurelio Fontana (ITA)	+ 4' 27"
27	James Driscoll (USA)	+ 4' 37"
28	Javier Ruiz De Larrinaga (ESP)	+ 5' 15"
29	Ian Field (GBR)	+ 5' 38"
30	Guillaume Perrot (FRA)	+ 5' 44"
31	Yu Takenouchi (JPN)	+ 5' 47"
32	Romain Lejeune (FRA)	+ 6' 00"
33	Christian Helmig (LUX)	2 LAPS
34	Craig Richey (CAN)	2 LAPS
35	Danny Summerhill (USA)	2 LAPS
36	Václav Metlička (SVK)	2 LAPS
37	Mike Garrigan (CAN)	4 LAPS
38	Alexander Revell (NZL)	4 LAPS
39	Hikaru Kosaka (JPN)	5 LAPS
40	Lewis Rattray (AUS)	5 LAPS
41	Zoltán Tisza (HUN)	5 LAPS
42	Maksym Shepitko (UKR)	5 LAPS
43	David Quist (NOR)	6 LAPS
	Ryan Trebon (USA)	DNF
	Twan van den Brand (NED)	DNF
