= Cyclo-cross Beringen =

Belgian cyclo-cross race

Race details
- Date: September
- Region: Beringen, Belgium
- Discipline: Cyclo-cross
- Competition: X2O Badkamers Trofee

History
- First edition: 2019
- Editions: 7 (as of 2026)
- First winner: Men: Quinten Hermans (BEL); Women: Annemarie Worst (NED)
- Most recent: Men: Thibau Nys (BEL); Women: Sara Casasola (ITA)

The Cyclo-cross Beringen is a cyclo-cross race held in Beringen, Belgium, which since 2026 is part of the X2O Trophy Exact Cross, and formerly of the Ethias/Brico Cross.

== Past winners ==
Year	Men's winner	Women's winner
2026	(Belgium) Thibau Nys	(Italy) Sara Casasola
2025	not held due to organization of Belgian championships in January 2026	not held due to organization of Belgian championships in January 2026
2024	(Netherlands) Lars van der Haar	(Netherlands) Fem van Empel
2023	(Belgium) Thibau Nys	(Netherlands) Fem van Empel
2022	(Belgium) Eli Iserbyt	(Netherlands) Fem van Empel
2021	(Belgium) Eli Iserbyt	(Netherlands) Yara Kastelijn
2020	(Belgium) Toon Aerts	(Netherlands) Denise Betsema
2019	(Belgium) Quinten Hermans	(Netherlands) Annemarie Worst
