= Herentals Crosst =

Race details
- Date: December/January
- Region: Herentals, Belgium
- English name: Herentals is Cyclo-crossing
- Discipline: Cyclo-cross
- Competition: Cyclo-cross Trophy
- Type: one-day

History (men)
- First edition: 2020
- Editions: 5 (as of 2024)
- First winner: Wout van Aert (BEL)
- Most wins: Wout van Aert (BEL); Mathieu van der Poel (NED); (2 wins)
- Most recent: Michael Vanthourenhout (BEL)

History (women)
- First edition: 2020
- Editions: 5 (as of 2024)
- First winner: Ceylin del Carmen Alvarado (NED)
- Most wins: Fem van Empel (NED); (2 wins)
- Most recent: Fem van Empel (NED)

The Herentals Crosst race, also known as Cyclo-cross Herentals, is a cyclo-cross race held in Herentals, Belgium. The race has been held since 2020 as part of the X²O Badkamers Trophy. In 2020 it replaced the Azencross Loenhout when organizers were looking for a suitable alternative in a less crowded area during the COVID-19 lockdowns. The race is usually held in the month of December.

== Past winners ==
Year	Men's winner	Women's winner
2024	(Belgium) Michael Vanthourenhout	(Netherlands) Fem van Empel
Dec. 2023	(Netherlands) Mathieu van der Poel	(Netherlands) Fem van Empel
Jan. 2023	(Netherlands) Mathieu van der Poel	(Netherlands) Puck Pieterse
2022	(Belgium) Wout van Aert	(Netherlands) Lucinda Brand
2020	(Belgium) Wout van Aert	(Netherlands) Ceylin del Carmen Alvarado
