= Cyclocross Gullegem =

- 2024 logo

Race details
- Region: Gullegem, Belgium
- Discipline: Cyclo-cross
- Web site: cyclocrossgullegem.be

History
- First edition: 2018
- Editions: 9 (as of 2026)
- First winner: Nick Van De Kerckhove (BEL)
- Most wins: Mathieu van der Poel (NED) (3 wins)
- Most recent: Niels Vandeputte (BEL)

History (women)
- First winner: Jolien Verschueren (BEL)
- Most recent: Amandine Fouquenet (FRA)

Cyclocross Gullegem, officially the Hexia cyclocross Gullegem, is a cyclo-cross race that has been organized annually since 2018 in Gullegem, Belgium.

== Winners ==
=== Men ===
Year	Winner	Second	Third
2026	(Belgium) Niels Vandeputte	(Belgium) Michael Vanthourenhout	(Netherlands) Joris Nieuwenhuis
2025	(Belgium) Wout van Aert	(Belgium) Eli Iserbyt	(Belgium) Michael Vanthourenhout
2024	(Belgium) Michael Vanthourenhout	(United Kingdom) Cameron Mason	(Belgium) Joran Wyseure
2023	(Belgium) Wout van Aert	(Belgium) Eli Iserbyt	(Belgium) Michael Vanthourenhout
2022	(United Kingdom) Tom Pidcock	(Belgium) Joran Wyseure	(Belgium) Quinten Hermans
2021	(Netherlands) Mathieu van der Poel	(United Kingdom) Tom Pidcock	(Belgium) Jens Adams
2020	(Netherlands) Mathieu van der Poel	(Belgium) Michael Vanthourenhout	(Netherlands) Corné van Kessel
2019	(Netherlands) Mathieu van der Poel	(Belgium) Gianni Vermeersch	(Netherlands) David van der Poel
2018	(Belgium) Nick Van De Kerckhove	(Belgium) Mathieu Willemyns	(Belgium) Jenko Bonne

=== Women ===
Year	Winner	Second	Third
2026	(France) Amandine Fouquenet	(Belgium) Marion Norbert-Riberolle	(Canada) Rafaelle Carrier
2025	(Netherlands) Lucinda Brand	(United Kingdom) Zoe Bäckstedt	(Netherlands) Ceylin del Carmen Alvarado
2024	(United Kingdom) Zoe Bäckstedt	(Netherlands) Manon Bakker	(Netherlands) Inge van der Heijden
2023	(Netherlands) Ceylin del Carmen Alvarado	(Netherlands) Inge van der Heijden	(Netherlands) Denise Betsema
2022	(Netherlands) Shirin van Anrooij	(Canada) Maghalie Rochette	(United Kingdom) Zoe Bäckstedt
2021	(Hungary) Kata Blanka Vas	(Netherlands) Inge van der Heijden	(Belgium) Sanne Cant
2020	(Netherlands) Ceylin del Carmen Alvarado	(Netherlands) Yara Kastelijn	(Netherlands) Shirin van Anrooij
2019	(Belgium) Loes Sels	(Netherlands) Annemarie Worst	(United Kingdom) Nikki Brammeier
2018	(Belgium) Jolien Verschueren	(Belgium) Ellen Van Loy	(Belgium) Joyce Vanderbeken
