= Noordzeecross =

- Poster to the 2024 edition

Race details
- Region: Middelkerke, Belgium
- English name: North Sea Cross
- Local name: Noordzeecross (in Dutch)
- Discipline: Cyclo-cross
- Competition: Superprestige
- Type: one-day
- Web site: www.noordzeecross.com

History (men)
- First edition: 1959
- Editions: 67 (as of 2026)
- First winner: Firmin Van Kerrebroeck (BEL)
- Most wins: Norbert Dedeckere (BEL) (6 wins)
- Most recent: Joran Wyseure (BEL)

History (women)
- First edition: 2012
- Editions: 15 (as of 2026)
- First winner: Daphny van den Brand (NED)
- Most wins: Sanne Cant (BEL) (5 wins)
- Most recent: Aniek van Alphen (NED)

The Noordzeecross (Dutch for North Sea cross) is a cyclo-cross race held in Middelkerke, Belgium with the first edition in 1959. Since the 2011 edition (2010–2011 season) the race is a part of the Superprestige.

== Podiums ==
=== Men ===
Year	Winner	Second	Third
Nov. 2026	Joran Wyseure (BEL)	Michael Vanthourenhout (BEL)	Kevin Kuhn (SUI)
Feb. 2026	Michael Vanthourenhout (BEL)	Niels Vandeputte (BEL)	Gerben Kuypers (BEL)
2025	Joris Nieuwenhuis (NED)	Eli Iserbyt (BEL)	Niels Vandeputte (BEL)
2024	Eli Iserbyt (BEL)	Michael Vanthourenhout (BEL)	Joris Nieuwenhuis (NED)
2023	Eli Iserbyt (BEL)	Lars van der Haar (NED)	Laurens Sweeck (BEL)
2021	Laurens Sweeck (BEL)	Michael Vanthourenhout (BEL)	Eli Iserbyt (BEL)
2020	Laurens Sweeck (BEL)	Toon Aerts (BEL)	Eli Iserbyt (BEL)
2019	Mathieu van der Poel (NED)	Michael Vanthourenhout (BEL)	Toon Aerts (BEL)
2018	Mathieu van der Poel (NED)	Tim Merlier (BEL)	Michael Vanthourenhout (BEL)
2017	Mathieu van der Poel (NED)	Wout Van Aert (BEL)	Laurens Sweeck (BEL)
2016	Mathieu van der Poel (NED)	Tom Meeusen (BEL)	Wout Van Aert (BEL)
2015	Kevin Pauwels (BEL)	Mathieu van der Poel (NED)	Wout Van Aert (BEL)
2014	Tom Meeusen (BEL)	Kevin Pauwels (BEL)	Sven Nys (BEL)
2013	Klaas Vantornout (BEL)	Niels Albert (BEL)	Tom Meeusen (BEL)
2012	Zdeněk Štybar (CZE)	Sven Nys (BEL)	Tom Meeusen (BEL)
2011	Klaas Vantornout (BEL)	Kevin Pauwels (BEL)	Bart Wellens (BEL)
2009	Sven Nys (BEL)	Tom Meeusen (BEL)	Klaas Vantornout (BEL)
2008	Sven Nys (BEL)	Thijs Al (NED)	Enrico Franzoi (ITA)
2007	Sven Nys (BEL)	Jonathan Page (USA)	Gerben de Knegt (NED)
2006	Bart Wellens (BEL)	Jonathan Page (USA)	Enrico Franzoi (ITA)
2005	Sven Vanthourenhout (BEL)	Gerben de Knegt (NED)	Jonathan Page (USA)
2004	Sven Vanthourenhout (BEL)	Davy Commeyne (BEL)	Peter Van Santvliet (BEL)
2003	Sven Nys (BEL)	Bart Wellens (BEL)	Ben Berden (BEL)
2002	Sven Nys (BEL)	Tom Vannoppen (BEL)	Erwin Vervecken (BEL)
2001	Sven Vanthourenhout (BEL)	Davy Commeyne (BEL)	Klaas Vantornout (BEL)
2000	Kurt De Roose (BEL)	Peter Willemsens (BEL)	Sven Raeymakers (BEL)
1999	Peter Willemsens (BEL)	Kris Wouters (BEL)	Kurt De Roose (BEL)
1998	David Willemsens (BEL)	Peter Willemsens (BEL)	Paul Herygers (BEL)
1997	Paul Herygers (BEL)	Danny De Bie (BEL)	Kurt De Roose (BEL)
1996	Paul Herygers (BEL)	Marc Janssens (BEL)	Kris Wouters (BEL)
1993	Arne Daelmans (BEL)	Peter Willemsens (BEL)	Guy Vandijck (BEL)

=== Women ===
Year	Winner	Second	Third
Nov. 2026	Aniek van Alphen (NED)	Inge van der Heijden (NED)	Denise Betsema (NED)
Feb. 2026	Amandine Fouquenet (FRA)	Ceylin del Carmen Alvarado (NED)	Marie Schreiber (LUX)
2025	Inge van der Heijden (NED)	Lucinda Brand (NED)	Sara Casasola (ITA)
2024	Lucinda Brand (NED)	Laura Verdonschot (NED)	Ceylin del Carmen Alvarado (NED)
2023	Ceylin del Carmen Alvarado (NED)	Lucinda Brand (NED)	Annemarie Worst (NED)
2021	Denise Betsema (NED)	Ceylin del Carmen Alvarado (NED)	Lucinda Brand (NED)
2020	Ceylin del Carmen Alvarado (NED)	Denise Betsema (NED)	Annemarie Worst (NED)
2019	~~Denise Betsema (NED)~~	Ceylin del Carmen Alvarado (NED)	Loes Sels (BEL)
2018	Sanne Cant (BEL)	Maud Kaptheijns (NED)	Laura Verdonschot (BEL)
2017	Sanne Cant (BEL)	Sophie de Boer (NED)	Ellen Van Loy (BEL)
2016	Sanne Cant (BEL)	Sophie de Boer (NED)	Nikki Harris (GBR)
2015	Sanne Cant (BEL)	Helen Wyman (GBR)	Femke Van den Driessche (BEL)
2014	Helen Wyman (GBR)	Sanne Cant (BEL)	Jolien Verschueren (BEL)
2013	Sanne Cant (BEL)	Helen Wyman (GBR)	Ellen Van Loy (BEL)
2012	Daphny van den Brand (NED)	Nikki Harris (GBR)	Pavla Havlíková (CZE)
