= Brussels Universities Cyclocross =

Race details
- Date: February
- Region: Brussels, Belgium
- Discipline: Cyclo-cross
- Competition: Cyclo-cross Trophy
- Type: one-day

History (men)
- First edition: 2019
- Editions: 8 (as of 2026)
- First winner: Mathieu van der Poel (NED)
- Most wins: Michael Vanthourenhout (BEL); (3 wins)
- Most recent: Michael Vanthourenhout (BEL)

History (women)
- First edition: 2019
- Editions: 8 (as of 2026)
- First winner: Ceylin del Carmen Alvarado (NED)
- Most wins: Ceylin del Carmen Alvarado (NED); (4 wins)
- Most recent: Ceylin del Carmen Alvarado (NED)

The Brussels Universities Cyclocross race, officially called Soudal Brussels Universities Cyclocross for sponsorship reasons, is a cyclo-cross race held since 2019 in Brussels, Belgium. The race is held on the adjacent campuses of the two neighboring universities namely the French-speaking Université libre de Bruxelles and the Dutch-speaking Vrije Universiteit Brussel at Eastern Ixelles. The race is part of the Cyclo-cross Trophy.

During the prize ceremony the top 3 riders are awarded a graduation cap.

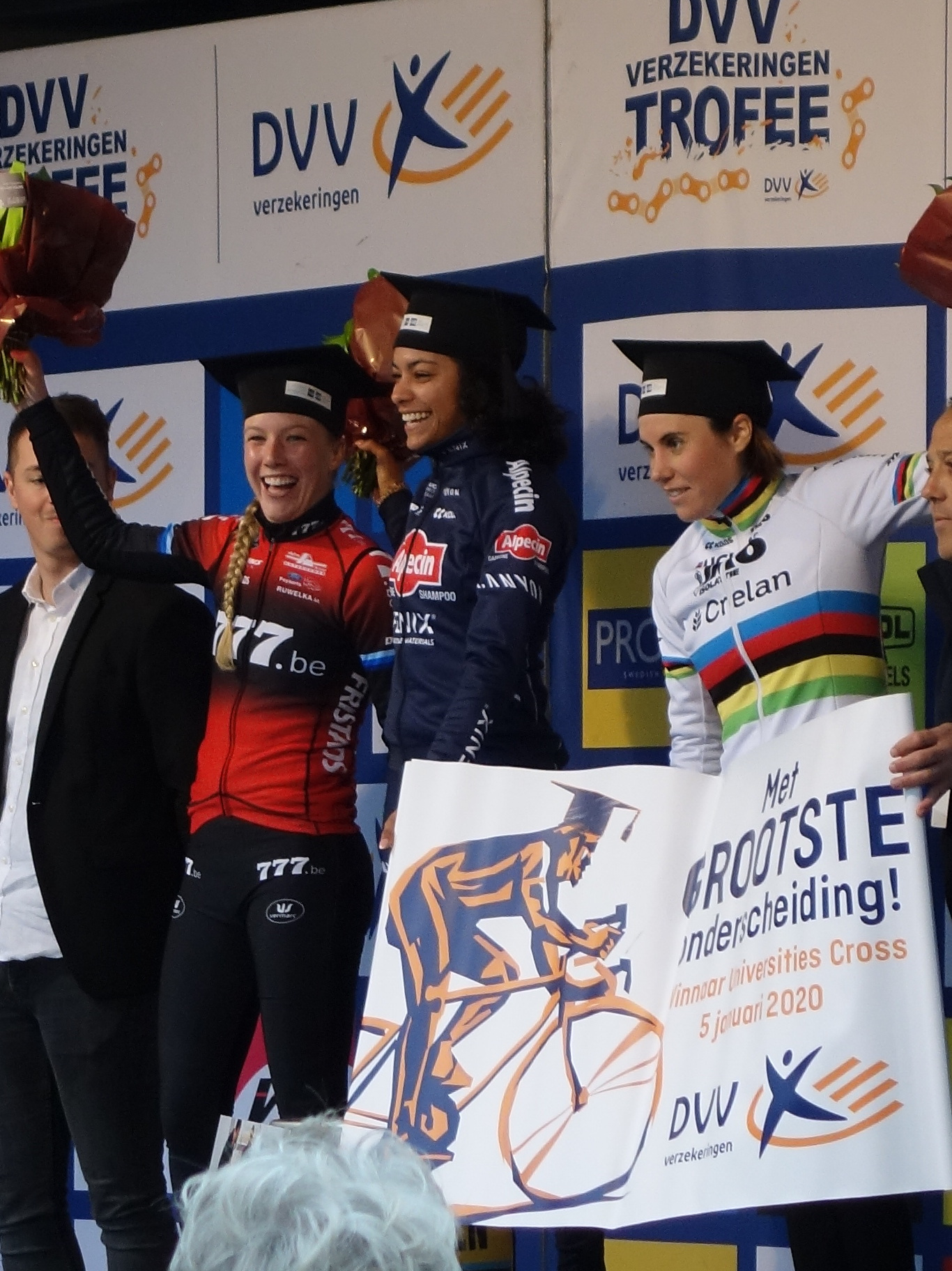
Top 3 riders of the 2020 race, Annemarie Worst (left), Ceylin del Carmen Alvarado (middle), Sanne Cant (right), on the podium wearing the graduation caps.

== History ==
After the discontinuation of the cyclo-cross race Grand Prix de la Région Wallonne in 2016, the sporting event firm Golazo was allowed by UCI and Royal Belgian Cycling League to use its license to organize a new race in Wallonia or Brussels Capital Region. In 2019 the first edition was held on the site on the campus of both Brussels universities. Since the first edition in 2019 this event has been part of the Cyclo-cross Trophy series.

== Past winners ==
=== Elite Men ===
Season	Series	Winner	Second	Third
2025–2026	X²O Badkamers Trophy	Michael Vanthourenhout (BEL)	Niels Vandeputte (BEL)	Gerben Kuypers (BEL)
2024–2025	X²O Badkamers Trophy	Michael Vanthourenhout (BEL)	Joris Nieuwenhuis (NED)	Lars van der Haar (NED)
2023–2024	X²O Badkamers Trophy	Eli Iserbyt (BEL)	Michael Vanthourenhout (BEL)	Joris Nieuwenhuis (NED)
2022–2023	X²O Badkamers Trophy	Eli Iserbyt (BEL)	Michael Vanthourenhout (BEL)	Lars van der Haar (NED)
2021–2022	X²O Badkamers Trophy	Michael Vanthourenhout (BEL)	Eli Iserbyt (BEL)	Jens Adams (BEL)
2020–2021	X²O Badkamers Trophy	Toon Aerts (BEL)	Quinten Hermans (BEL)	Niels Vandeputte (BEL)
2019–2020	DVV Trophy	Mathieu van der Poel (NED)	Eli Iserbyt (BEL)	Corné van Kessel (NED)
2018–2019	DVV Trophy	Mathieu van der Poel (NED)	Toon Aerts (BEL)	Michael Vanthourenhout (BEL)

=== Elite Women ===
Season	Series	Winner	Second	Third
2025–2026	Cyclo-cross Trophy	Ceylin del Carmen Alvarado (NED)	Lucinda Brand (NED)	Manon Bakker (NED)
2024–2025	Cyclo-cross Trophy	Sara Casasola (ITA)	Marion Norbert-Riberolle (BEL)	Lucinda Brand (NED)
2023–2024	Cyclo-cross Trophy	Lucinda Brand (NED)	Marion Norbert-Riberolle (BEL)	Manon Bakker (NED)
2022–2023	Cyclo-cross Trophy	Fem van Empel (NED)	Lucinda Brand (NED)	Annemarie Worst (NED)
2021–2022	Cyclo-cross Trophy	Denise Betsema (NED)	Lucinda Brand (NED)	Manon Bakker (NED)
2020–2021	Cyclo-cross Trophy	Ceylin del Carmen Alvarado (NED)	Denise Betsema (NED)	Manon Bakker (NED)
2019–2020	Cyclo-cross Trophy	Ceylin del Carmen Alvarado (NED)	Annemarie Worst (NED)	Sanne Cant (BEL)
2018–2019	Cyclo-cross Trophy	Ceylin del Carmen Alvarado (NED)	Loes Sels (BEL)	Laura Verdonschot (BEL)
