= Urban Cross =

Race details
- Date: November
- Region: Kortrijk, Belgium
- Discipline: Cyclo-cross
- Competition: X²O Badkamers Trophy (2019-2023); Exact Cross (2024-)

History
- First edition: 2019
- Editions: 7 (as of 2025)
- First winner: Mathieu van der Poel (NED)
- Most wins: Eli Iserbyt (BEL) (3 wins)
- Most recent: Niels Vandeputte (BEL)

The Urban Cross is a cyclo-cross race held in Kortrijk, Belgium, which was formerly part of the X²O Badkamers Trophy.

== Past winners ==
Year	Men's winner	Women's winner
2025	(Belgium) Niels Vandeputte	(Netherlands) Inge van der Heijden
2024	(Belgium) Eli Iserbyt	(Netherlands) Fem van Empel
2023	(Belgium) Eli Iserbyt	(Netherlands) Fem van Empel
2022	(United Kingdom) Tom Pidcock	(Netherlands) Marianne Vos
2021	(Belgium) Toon Aerts	(Netherlands) Lucinda Brand
2020	(Belgium) Eli Iserbyt	(Netherlands) Lucinda Brand
2019	(Netherlands) Mathieu van der Poel	(Netherlands) Lucinda Brand
