= Druivencross =

Cycling race held in Belgium

Vlaamse Druivenveldrit
- Poster to the 2025 edition

Race details
- Date: December
- Region: Overijse, Belgium
- English name: Overijse cyclo-cross
- Local name: Overijse
- Nickname(s): Dutch: De moeder van alle crossen The mother of all crosses
- Discipline: Cyclo-cross
- Competition: Superprestige
- Type: Single-day
- Organiser: VZW Sportvrienden Overijse
- Race director: Willy Van Roy

History
- First edition: 1960
- Editions: 88 (as of 2026) (Note: Includes Belgian Championship editions.)
- First winner: Pierre Kumps (BEL)
- Most wins: Roland Liboton (BEL) (15 wins)
- Most recent: Michael Vanthourenhout (BEL)

The Druivencross, also known as Vlaamse Druivenveldrit, is a cyclo-cross race held in Overijse, Belgium. The race is organised by the VZW Sportvrienden Overijse and was first held in 1960. The race is regarded as a Cyclo-cross classic and has a difficult and dangerous parcours that often results in crashes.

== History ==
Two members of the Overijse cycling club, Frans Vanhoey and Joris Bergiers, originally organized the event in 1960. Up until 1989 the race was usually held twice a year and was held three times in 1975. In addition the Belgian national cyclo-cross championships have been held on the course on five occasions in 1965, 1976, 1983, 1990 and 1996 and were organized by the same organizations. On two occasions a two-man cyclo-cross race or Koppelveldrit was also run on the same course and disputed by professional or elite cyclo-cross riders. In 1974, Roger De Vlaeminck and Frans Verbeeck won and in 1984 Adri van der Poel and Hennie Kuiper won. The 1984 Koppelveldrit was organised as a retirement race for Roger De Vlaeminck.

The event formed part of the Superprestige cyclocross series from the beginning of the Superprestige in 1983 until the 2001–2002 season. After that the Race was not part of a cyclo-cross classification competition. In the 2020–2021 season the race was the last race of the UCI Cyclo-cross World Cup.

The race has been won by many of the top cyclo-cross cyclists with multiple Cyclocross world champion Roland Liboton being the record holder in the event with 15 wins. Liboton is followed by the De Vlaeminck brothers, Eric and Roger who have nine and six wins each, as well as Sven Nys who also has six. In the 2005 edition, Bart Wellens kicked a spectator who was allegedly throwing beer at him. Wellens went on to win the event after Boom slipped in the final lap and initially was awarded the win despite the threat of disqualification. Several days later after a meeting of the three race commissionaires and the UCI, Wellens was disqualified and Boom was awarded the win.

In 2023, the race was added to the Superprestige calendar.

== Past winners ==
Year	Date	Winner	Team
2026	25 Oct	(Belgium) Michael Vanthourenhout	Pauwels Sauzen–Altez Industriebouw Cycling Team
2025	26 Oct	(Belgium) Michael Vanthourenhout	Pauwels Sauzen–Cibel Clementines
2024	27 Oct	(Belgium) Thibau Nys	Baloise–Trek Lions
2023	22 Oct	(Belgium) Eli Iserbyt	Pauwels Sauzen–Bingoal
2022	20 Nov	(Belgium) Michael Vanthourenhout	Pauwels Sauzen–Bingoal
Oct. 2021	31 Oct	(Belgium) Eli Iserbyt	Pauwels Sauzen–Bingoal
Jan. 2021	24 Jan	(Belgium) Wout van Aert	Team Jumbo–Visma
2019	15 Dec	(Netherlands) Mathieu van der Poel (4)	Corendon–Circus
2018	9 Dec	(Belgium) Toon Aerts	Telenet–Fidea Lions
2017	10 Dec	(Netherlands) Mathieu van der Poel (3)	Beobank–Corendon
2016	11 Dec	(Netherlands) Mathieu van der Poel (2)	Beobank–Corendon
2015	6 Dec	(Netherlands) Mathieu van der Poel	BKCP–Powerplus
2014	7 Dec	(Belgium) Tom Meeusen	Telenet–Fidea
2013		(Belgium) Sven Nys (6)	Crelan–Euphony
2012		(Belgium) Sven Nys (5)	Landbouwkrediet–Euphony
2011		(Belgium) Sven Nys (4)	Landbouwkrediet
2010		(Belgium) Sven Nys (3)	Landbouwkrediet
2009		(Belgium) Niels Albert	
2008		(Belgium) Kevin Pauwels	Fidea
2007		(Belgium) Klaas Vantornout	Fidea
2006		(Belgium) Sven Nys (2)	Rabobank
2005		(Netherlands) Lars Boom (Note: Bart Wellens, the original winner, got disqualified for kicking at a spectator during the race.)	Rabobank
2004		(Belgium) Sven Nys	Rabobank
2003		(Belgium) Bart Wellens (2)	Spaarselect
2002		(Belgium) Bart Wellens	Spaarselect
2001		(Belgium) Tom Vannoppen	Collstrop-Palmans
2000		(Belgium) Erwin Vervecken (2)	Record Bank
1999		(Netherlands) Richard Groenendaal (2)	Rabobank
1998		(Belgium) Erwin Vervecken	Espace Card
1997		(Netherlands) Richard Groenendaal	Rabobank
1996		(Italy) Luca Bramati (2)	
1995		(Italy) Luca Bramati	Selle Italia-Velta
1994		(Netherlands) Adri van der Poel	Collstrop-Cystex
1993		(Italy) Daniele Pontoni (2)	Zalf
1992		(Italy) Daniele Pontoni	Zalf
1991		(Switzerland) Thomas Frischknecht	
1990		(Belgium) Danny De Bie (2)	SEFB-Saxon
1989		(Belgium) Christian Hautekeete	
1988	18 Dec	(Belgium) Danny De Bie	
1988	17 Jan	(Netherlands) Hennie Stamsnijder (3)	PDM–Concorde
1987	20 Dec	(Belgium) Roland Liboton (15)	Guerciotti–Falcon
1987	18 Jan	(Belgium) Roland Liboton (14)	Guerciotti–Falcon
1986	21 Dec	(Netherlands) Hennie Stamsnijder (2)	PDM–Concorde
1986	19 Jan	(Belgium) Roland Liboton (13)	Guerciotti–Falcon
1985	20 Jan	(Netherlands) Hennie Stamsnijder	Willy Van Doorne
1985	22 Dec	(Belgium) Roland Liboton (12)	Guerciotti
1984	22 Dec	(Belgium) Roland Liboton (11)	Guerciotti
1984	22 Jan	(Belgium) Roland Liboton (10)	Guerciotti
1983	11 Dec	(Belgium) Roland Liboton (9)	Guerciotti
1983	23 Jan	(Belgium) Roland Liboton (8)	Guerciotti
1982	21 Nov	(Belgium) Roland Liboton (7)	Vermeer Thijs
1982	24 Jan	(Belgium) Roland Liboton (6)	Vermeer Thijs
1981	22 Nov	(Belgium) Roland Liboton (5)	Vermeer Thijs
1981	25 Jan	(Belgium) Roland Liboton (4)	Vermeer Thijs
1980	23 Nov	(Belgium) Roland Liboton (3)	Marc VRD
1980	6 Jan	(Belgium) Roland Liboton (2)	Marc VRD
1979	18 Nov	(Belgium) Jan Teugels (2)	Duval
1979	7 Jan	(Belgium) Bert Vermeire	Marc Zeepcentrale–Superia
1978	19 Nov	(Belgium) Jan Teugels	Duval
1978	29 Jan	(Belgium) Roland Liboton	
1977	20 Nov	(Belgium) Roger De Vlaeminck (6)	Brooklyn
1977	9 Jan	(Belgium) Erik De Vlaeminck (9)	Gios-Torino
1976		(Belgium) Erik De Vlaeminck (8)	Gero-Eurosol
1975	29 Nov	(Belgium) Roger De Vlaeminck (5)	Brooklyn
1975	2 Nov	(Belgium) Norbert Dedeckere (2)	Flandria–Carpenter
1975	4 Jan	(Belgium) Roger De Vlaeminck (4)	Brooklyn
1974		(Belgium) Norbert Dedeckere	Flandria–Carpenter
1973		(Belgium) Roger De Vlaeminck (3)	Brooklyn
1972	15 Oct	(Belgium) Albert van Damme	Rokado
1972	23 Jan	(Belgium) Erik De Vlaeminck (7)	Flandria Beaulieu
1971	31 Oct	(Belgium) Erik De Vlaeminck (6)	Flandria–Mars
1971	24 Jan	(Belgium) Erik De Vlaeminck (5)	Flandria–Mars
1970		(Belgium) Roger De Vlaeminck (2)	Flandria–Mars
1969		(Belgium) Roger De Vlaeminck	Flandria–De Clerck
1968		(Belgium) Erik De Vlaeminck (4)	Goldor–Gerka
1967		(Belgium) Erik De Vlaeminck (3)	Groene Leeuw
1966		(Belgium) Erik De Vlaeminck (2)	Wiels-Groene Leeuw
1965		(Belgium) Erik De Vlaeminck	Wiels-Groene Leeuw
1964		(Belgium) Roger De Clercq (3)	Wiels-Groene Leeuw
1963		(Belgium) Roger De Clercq (2)	Wiels-Groene Leeuw
1962		(Belgium) Pierre Kumps (2)	
1961		(Belgium) Roger De Clercq	Groene Leeuw-SAS
1960		(Belgium) Pierre Kumps	

== Women's winners ==
Year	Winner	Team
2026	(Netherlands) Lucinda Brand	Baloise Verzekeringen–Het Poetsbureau Lions
2025	(Italy) Sara Casasola	Crelan-Corendon
2024	(Netherlands) Lucinda Brand	Baloise–Trek Lions
2023	(Netherlands) Fem van Empel	Team Jumbo–Visma
2022	(Netherlands) Puck Pieterse	Alpecin–Deceuninck
Oct. 2021	(Hungary) Kata Blanka Vas	SD Worx
Jan. 2021	(Netherlands) Ceylin del Carmen Alvarado	Alpecin–Fenix
2019	(Netherlands) Annemarie Worst	777
2018	(Netherlands) Lucinda Brand	Team Sunweb
2017	(France) Pauline Ferrand-Prévot	Canyon//SRAM
2016	(Netherlands) Sophie de Boer	Kalas–H.Essers–NNOF
2015	(Belgium) Jolien Verschueren	Telenet–Fidea
2014	(Belgium) Sanne Cant	Enertherm–BKCP
2013	(United States) Katie Compton	Trek Cyclocross Collective
2012	(United States) Katie Compton	
2011	(United States) Katie Compton	
2007	(Germany) Stefanie Pohl	Team Getränke-Hoffmann
2006	(Netherlands) Daphny van den Brand	AA Drink
2005	(Netherlands) Daphny van den Brand	
2004	(Netherlands) Daphny van den Brand	
2003	(Belgium) Hilde Quintens	
2002	(France) Laurence Leboucher	
2000	(Netherlands) Daphny van den Brand	

== Winners when run as Belgian Cyclo Cross Championships ==
Year	Winner	Amateur Winner
1996	Erwin Vervecken	
1990	Danny De Bie	Marc Janssens
1983	Roland Liboton	Werner van der Fraenen
1976	Marc de Block	Bert Vermeire
1965	Albert van Damme	
