= 2021–22 UCI Cyclo-cross World Cup =

Bicycle racing competition

Details
- Location: Belgium; Czech Republic; France; Italy; Netherlands; United States
- Races: ~~16~~ 15

Champions
- Male individual champion: Eli Iserbyt (BEL) (Pauwels Sauzen–Bingoal)
- Female individual champion: Lucinda Brand (NED) (Baloise–Trek Lions)

The 2021–22 Telenet UCI Cyclo-cross World Cup was a season-long cyclo-cross competition, organized by the Union Cycliste Internationale (UCI). The UCI Cyclo-cross World Cup took place between 10 October 2021 and 23 January 2022. This season the number of races was expanded to 16, whereas in regular seasons most recently only about 9 were organized. The intention was to already expand to 14 races during the 2020–21 season, but as a result of the COVID-19 pandemic, the previous season was reduced to five races only.

The defending champions were Wout van Aert in the men's competition and Lucinda Brand in the women's competition.

== Points distribution ==
Points were awarded to all eligible riders at each race. From this season, the points awarded are according to the same scale for all categories, but only the top 25 riders receive points rather than the top 50. The top ten finishers received points according to the following table:

Points awarded
Position	1	2	3	4	5	6	7	8	9	10
Elite riders	40	30	25	22	21	20	19	18	17	16

- Riders finishing in positions 11 to 25 also received points, going down from 15 points for 11th place by one point per place to 1 point for 25th place.
- Note that the points given here are entirely different from the UCI ranking points, which are distributed according to a different scale and determine starting order in races, but have no impact on World Cup standings.

== Events ==
Fourteen races were supposed to be held last season, but eventually, only five were held. These five are also included this season but the calendar is expanded further to sixteen races, with last season's cancelled races in Antwerp, Besançon, Hoogerheide, Koksijde, Waterloo and Zonhoven returning to the calendar, as well as the race in Iowa which last featured in the 2019–20 season. Entirely new will be the races in Fayetteville (United States), Flamanville (France), Rucphen (Netherlands) and Val di Sole (Italy).

Due to the COVID-19 pandemic, the race in Antwerp was annulled.

Date	Race	Location	Winners				
Date	Race	Location	Elite men	Elite women	Under-23 men	Junior men	Junior women
10 October 2021	World Cup Waterloo	Waterloo, United States	Eli Iserbyt (BEL)	Marianne Vos (NED)	No under-23 or junior races		
13 October 2021	Cyclo-cross Fayetteville	Fayetteville, United States	Quinten Hermans (BEL)	Lucinda Brand (NED)	No under-23 or junior races		
17 October 2021	Jingle Cross	Iowa City, United States	Eli Iserbyt (BEL)	Marianne Vos (NED)	No under-23 or junior races		
24 October 2021	Cyclo-cross Zonhoven	Zonhoven, Belgium	Toon Aerts (BEL)	Denise Betsema (NED)	No under-23 or junior races		
31 October 2021	Vlaamse Druivencross	Overijse, Belgium	Eli Iserbyt (BEL)	Kata Blanka Vas (HUN)	No under-23 or junior races		
14 November 2021	Cyklokros Tábor	Tábor, Czech Republic	Lars van der Haar (NED)	Lucinda Brand (NED)	Mees Hendrikx (NED)	David Haverdings (NED)	Zoe Bäckstedt (GBR)
21 November 2021	Duinencross	Koksijde, Belgium	Eli Iserbyt (BEL)	Annemarie Worst (NED)	No under-23 or junior races		
28 November 2021	Cyclo-cross Besançon	Besançon, France	Eli Iserbyt (BEL)	Lucinda Brand (NED)	No under-23 or junior races		
5 December 2021	Scheldecross	Antwerp, Belgium	Cancelled due to the COVID-19 pandemic		No under-23 or junior races		
12 December 2021	Cyclo-cross Val di Sole	Val di Sole, Italy	Wout Van Aert (BEL)	Fem van Empel (NED)	No under-23 or junior races		
18 December 2021	Cyclo-cross Rucphen	Rucphen, Netherlands	Tom Pidcock (GBR)	Marianne Vos (NED)	No under-23 or junior races		
19 December 2021	Citadelcross	Namur, Belgium	Michael Vanthourenhout (BEL)	Lucinda Brand (NED)	Pim Ronhaar (NED)	David Haverdings (NED)	Zoe Bäckstedt (GBR)
26 December 2021	Ambiancecross Dendermonde	Dendermonde, Belgium	Wout Van Aert (BEL)	Lucinda Brand (NED)	Cameron Mason (GBR)	David Haverdings (NED)	Zoe Bäckstedt (GBR)
2 January 2022	Vestingcross	Hulst, Netherlands	Tom Pidcock (GBR)	Lucinda Brand (NED)	No under-23 or junior races		
16 January 2022	Cyclo-cross Flamanville	Flamanville, France	Eli Iserbyt (BEL)	Fem van Empel (NED)	Emiel Verstrynge (BEL)	David Haverdings (NED)	Leonie Bentveld (NED)
23 January 2022	Grand Prix Adri van der Poel	Hoogerheide, Netherlands	Eli Iserbyt (BEL)	Marianne Vos (NED)	No under-23 or junior races		

== Points standings ==
Key
Colour	Result
Gold	Winner
Silver	2nd place
Bronze	3rd place
Green	Other points position
Blue	Other classified position
Blue	Not classified, finished (NC)
Purple	Not classified, retired (Ret)
Red	Took part in U23 race (U23)
Red	Took part in Junior race (J)
White	Did not start (DNS)

=== Elite men ===
Pos.	Rider	WAT (United States)	FAY (United States)	IOW (United States)	ZON (Belgium)	OVE (Belgium)	TAB (Czech Republic)	KOK (Belgium)	BES (France)	ANT (Belgium)	VdS (Italy)	RUC (Netherlands)	NAM (Belgium)	DEN (Belgium)	HUL (Netherlands)	FLA (France)	HOO (Netherlands)	Total Points
1	Eli Iserbyt (BEL)	1	2	1	3	1	2	1	1		4	2	5	9	2	1	1	485
2	Michael Vanthourenhout (BEL)	2	3	3	6	2	5	DNS	4		2	3	1	4	6	3	4	357
3	Toon Aerts (BEL)	6	4	4	1	3	4	3	2		DNS	6	3	3	5	2	5	348
4	Quinten Hermans (BEL)	3	1	5	5	5	3	4	DNS		5	4	4	5	7	DNS	7	299
5	Lars van der Haar (NED)	4	14	2	2	6	1	5	DNS		DNS	5	12	10	3	DNS	2	281
6	Laurens Sweeck (BEL)	DNS	DNS	DNS	4	4	6	2	10		DNS	7	7	7	8	4	10	223
7	Corné van Kessel (NED)	10	16	20	8	7	7	6	5		10	8	8	6	Ret	7	Ret	220
8	Toon Vandebosch (BEL)	11	9	12	9	15	17	11	8		9	10	20	13	10	8	9	219
9	Daan Soete (BEL)	12	11	7	7	17	12	8	DNS		8	13	6	18	11	11	11	212
10	Vincent Baestaens (BEL)	7	DNS	10	15	13	8	7	15		11	9	13	12	9	13	21	201
11	Tom Pidcock (GBR)	DNS	DNS	DNS	DNS	DNS	DNS	DNS	DNS		3	1	2	8	1	DNS	3	178
12	Kevin Kuhn (SUI)	13	19	11	13	20	16	18	21		7	11	17	19	12	5	14	174
13	Marcel Meisen (GER)	18	15	13	24	23	14	13	9		14	18	11	14	23	16	20	145
14	Niels Vandeputte (BEL)	5	7	21	25	8	U23	10	6		6	12	U23	U23	21	DNS	24	141
15	Jens Adams (BEL)	9	6	6	11	16	15	DNS	DNS		DNS	DNS	21	DNS	DNS	6	16	128
16	Ryan Kamp (NED)	8	12	8	12	10	U23	17	12		DNS	DNS	DNS	U23	19	U23	12	124
17	Wout van Aert (BEL)	DNS	DNS	DNS	DNS	DNS	DNS	DNS	DNS		1	DNS	DNS	1	4	DNS	DNS	102
18	Tom Meeusen (BEL)	DNS	DNS	DNS	DNS	18	13	15	7		13	20	DNS	DNS	DNS	12	8	102
19	Emiel Verstrynghe (BEL)	39	10	17	DNS	12	U23	DNS	14		DNS	DNS	U23	U23	14	U23	13	76
20	Felipe Orts (ESP)	DNS	DNS	DNS	18	21	DNS	23	11		DNS	14	18	DNS	16	19	19	75
21	Mees Hendrikx (NED)	DNS	DNS	DNS	16	19	U23	9	30		DNS	17	U23	U23	17	U23	6	72
22	Thijs Aerts (BEL)	15	20	14	22	DNS	DNS	DNS	DNS		DNS	DNS	14	11	30	15	DNS	71
23	Pim Ronhaar (NED)	19	5	30	10	Ret	U23	DNS	3		DNS	32	U23	U23	DNS	U23	DNS	69
24	Joshua Dubau (FRA)	DNS	DNS	DNS	DNS	14	DNS	DNS	18		DNS	DNS	9	DNS	DNS	9	DNS	54
25	Anton Ferdinande (BEL)	17	22	9	20	DNS	U23	14	DNS		DNS	DNS	U23	U23	DNS	DNS	DNS	50
26	Michael Boroš (CZE)	DNS	DNS	DNS	14	27	18	21	23		DNS	21	16	23	22	DNS	29	50
27	Cameron Mason (GBR)	DNS	DNS	DNS	17	9	U23	16	DNS		DNS	29	U23	U23	15	DNS	Ret	47
28	Timon Rüegg (SUI)	DNS	DNS	DNS	DNS	24	DNS	DNS	DNS		DNS	23	10	DNS	DNS	10	17	46
29	David van der Poel (NED)	DNS	DNS	DNS	31	28	11	14	DNS		DNS	16	36	20	Ret	DNS	DNS	43
30	Ben Turner (GBR)	DNS	DNS	DNS	DNS	DNS	DNS	DNS	DNS		19	24	19	15	18	DNS	18	43
31	Gage Hecht (USA)	21	8	15	DNS	DNS	DNS	DNS	DNS		DNS	DNS	27	21	DNS	DNS	DNS	39
32	Thomas Mein (GBR)	22	13	23	DNS	37	DNS	DNS	DNS		DNS	22	15	26	32	DNS	22	39
33	Gioele Bertolini (ITA)	DNS	DNS	DNS	29	DNS	9	DNS	22		16	36	22	25	DNS	DNS	DNS	36
34	Curtis White (USA)	23	18	16	DNS	DNS	DNS	DNS	DNS		DNS	25	23	17	27	DNS	DNS	34
35	Mathieu van der Poel (NED)	DNS	DNS	DNS	DNS	DNS	DNS	DNS	DNS		DNS	DNS	DNS	2	DNS	DNS	DNS	30
36	Clément Venturini (FRA)	DNS	DNS	DNS	DNS	DNS	DNS	DNS	DNS		DNS	DNS	DNS	DNS	20	14	15	29
37	Jakob Dorigoni (ITA)	DNS	DNS	DNS	DNS	DNS	10	DNS	DNS		17	26	25	43	DNS	DNS	30	26
38	Tim Merlier (BEL)	DNS	DNS	DNS	DNS	DNS	DNS	DNS	DNS		DNS	15	DNS	DNS	13	DNS	DNS	24
39	Joris Nieuwenhuis (NED)	DNS	DNS	DNS	21	11	DNS	DNS	DNS		DNS	DNS	DNS	DNS	DNS	DNS	DNS	20
40	Kerry Werner (USA)	14	25	19	DNS	DNS	DNS	DNS	DNS		DNS	35	31	31	34	DNS	DNS	20
41	Lander Loockx (BEL)	DNS	DNS	DNS	DNS	DNS	DNS	20	13		DNS	DNS	DNS	DNS	DNS	DNS	DNS	19
42	Davide Toneatti (ITA)	16	17	27	DNS	DNS	U23	DNS	DNS		30	DNS	U23	U23	DNS	U23	DNS	19
43	Gianni Vermeersch (BEL)	DNS	DNS	DNS	DNS	DNS	DNS	DNS	DNS		DNS	19	DNS	16	DNS	DNS	DNS	17
44	Diether Sweeck (BEL)	DNS	DNS	DNS	DNS	DNS	24	DNS	DNS		12	DNS	38	DNS	DNS	DNS	DNS	16
45	Théo Thomas (FRA)	DNS	DNS	DNS	23	DNS	U23	24	19		DNS	DNS	U23	U23	24	U23	45	14
46	Kevin Suárez Fernández (ESP)	DNS	DNS	DNS	26	29	23	25	DNS		DNS	27	29	33	26	17	DNS	13
47	David Menut (FRA)	DNS	DNS	DNS	DNS	Ret	19	DNS	20		DNS	DNS	DNS	DNS	DNS	DNS	26	13
48	Valentin Guillaud (FRA)	DNS	DNS	DNS	DNS	22	DNS	DNS	DNS		DNS	DNS	DNS	30	37	18	DNS	12
49	Filippo Fontana (ITA)	DNS	DNS	DNS	DNS	DNS	U23	DNS	DNS		15	DNS	U23	U23	DNS	DNS	DNS	11
50	Jente Michels (BEL)	DNS	DNS	DNS	DNS	DNS	U23	DNS	16		DNS	DNS	U23	U23	DNS	DNS	Ret	10
51	Michael van den Ham (CAN)	24	27	18	DNS	DNS	DNS	DNS	DNS		DNS	44	45	37	48	DNS	DNS	10
52	Eric Brunner (USA)	25	21	22	DNS	DNS	DNS	DNS	DNS		DNS	DNS	DNS	DNS	DNS	DNS	DNS	10
53	Loris Rouiller (SUI)	DNS	DNS	DNS	DNS	DNS	U23	DNS	17		DNS	DNS	U23	DNS	DNS	U23	Ret	9
54	Lance Haidet (USA)	20	24	25	DNS	DNS	DNS	DNS	DNS		DNS	42	33	27	DNS	DNS	DNS	9
55	Stan Godrie (NED)	DNS	DNS	DNS	28	34	DNS	22	31		DNS	28	26	22	25	28	28	9
56	Cristian Cominelli (ITA)	DNS	DNS	DNS	DNS	DNS	DNS	DNS	DNS		18	DNS	DNS	DNS	DNS	DNS	DNS	8
57	Tony Périou (FRA)	DNS	DNS	DNS	DNS	DNS	DNS	DNS	24		DNS	DNS	DNS	DNS	DNS	20	DNS	8
58	Yan Gras (FRA)	DNS	DNS	DNS	DNS	25	DNS	DNS	28		DNS	DNS	28	24	DNS	21	32	8
59	Thibau Nys (BEL)	Ret	DNS	DNS	DNS	DNS	U23	19	DNS		DNS	DNS	U23	U23	DNS	DNS	DNS	7
60	Witse Meeussen (BEL)	DNS	DNS	DNS	19	DNS	U23	DNS	DNS		DNS	DNS	U23	U23	DNS	DNS	DNS	7
61	Samuele Leone (ITA)	DNS	DNS	DNS	DNS	DNS	DNS	DNS	49		20	DNS	DNS	DNS	DNS	DNS	42	6
62	Marek Konwa (POL)	DNS	DNS	DNS	DNS	DNS	20	DNS	DNS		DNS	DNS	DNS	DNS	31	DNS	27	6
63	Antoine Huby (FRA)	DNS	DNS	DNS	DNS	26	U23	DNS	25		21	DNS	U23	DNS	DNS	U23	36	6
64	Gilles Mottiez (SUI)	DNS	DNS	DNS	DNS	33	DNS	DNS	33		DNS	DNS	24	DNS	DNS	24	DNS	6
65	Tomáš Paprstka (CZE)	DNS	DNS	DNS	DNS	DNS	21	DNS	DNS		DNS	DNS	DNS	DNS	35	DNS	DNS	5
66	Gosse van der Meer (NED)	26	26	24	DNS	DNS	DNS	DNS	35		DNS	38	35	29	40	23	38	5
67	Nicolas Samparisi (ITA)	DNS	DNS	DNS	DNS	DNS	26	DNS	36		22	DNS	40	DNS	DNS	DNS	DNS	4
68	Simon Vanicek (CZE)	DNS	DNS	DNS	DNS	DNS	22	DNS	DNS		DNS	DNS	DNS	Ret	Ret	DNS	DNS	4
69	Dario Lillo (SUI)	DNS	DNS	DNS	27	DNS	DNS	DNS	DNS		DNS	DNS	DNS	DNS	DNS	DNS	23	3
70	Lubomír Petruš (CZE)	DNS	DNS	DNS	DNS	DNS	Ret	28	34		23	51	37	35	67	DNS	DNS	3
71	Lorenzo Masciarelli (ITA)	28	23	28	DNS	DNS	DNS	DNS	DNS		28	DNS	U23	U23	DNS	DNS	39	3
72	Arthur Tropardy (FRA)	DNS	DNS	DNS	DNS	DNS	DNS	DNS	DNS		DNS	DNS	DNS	DNS	DNS	24	DNS	2
73	Matteo Oppizzi (SUI)	33	DNS	40	DNS	DNS	DNS	DNS	43		24	DNS	U23	U23	DNS	DNS	DNS	2
74	Danny van Lierop (NED)	DNS	DNS	DNS	DNS	DNS	DNS	DNS	DNS		DNS	DNS	DNS	DNS	51	DNS	25	1
75	Valentin Remondet (FRA)	DNS	DNS	DNS	DNS	DNS	DNS	DNS	DNS		DNS	DNS	DNS	DNS	DNS	25	DNS	1
76	Antonio Folcarelli (ITA)	DNS	DNS	DNS	DNS	DNS	DNS	DNS	DNS		25	DNS	DNS	DNS	DNS	DNS	DNS	1
77	Hannes Jeker (SUI)	DNS	DNS	DNS	DNS	46	25	DNS	46		DNS	DNS	DNS	DNS	DNS	DNS	DNS	1

=== Elite women ===
Pos.	Rider	WAT (United States)	FAY (United States)	IOW (United States)	ZON (Belgium)	OVE (Belgium)	TAB (Czech Republic)	KOK (Belgium)	BES (France)	ANT (Belgium)	VdS (Italy)	RUC (Netherlands)	NAM (Belgium)	DEN (Belgium)	HUL (Netherlands)	FLA (France)	HOO (Netherlands)	Total Points
1	Lucinda Brand (NED)	2	1	4	2	3	1	3	1		DNS	2	1	1	1	DNS	2	432
2	Denise Betsema (NED)	3	2	2	1	4	5	2	3		5	3	2	3	7	DNS	8	361
3	Puck Pieterse (NED)	8	5	5	4	2	2	7	5		9	5	3	6	2	2	3	350
4	Fem van Empel (NED)	14	13	13	5	12	8	6	4		1	4	4	11	5	1	4	315
5	Marianne Vos (NED)	1	4	1	DNS	DNS	DNS	DNS	DNS		2	1	DNS	4	6	DNS	1	254
6	Shirin van Anrooij (NED)	16	11	8	6	8	7	4	8		DNS	7	8	5	8	DNS	8	236
7	Inge van der Heijden (NED)	17	14	11	7	15	9	8	6		DNS	10	7	14	9	4	12	221
8	Kata Blanka Vas (HUN)	6	6	3	DNS	1	6	DNS	DNS		DNS	DNS	Ret	8	4	3	5	211
9	Hélène Clauzel (FRA)	7	DNS	7	16	13	12	19	11		6	22	6	12	11	6	14	202
10	Annemarie Worst (NED)	5	8	6	DNS	DNS	3	1	16		DNS	6	13	DNS	3	DNS	DNS	192
11	Clara Honsinger (USA)	12	3	12	DNS	5	11	10	7		DNS	27	11	2	18	DNS	DNS	177
12	Eva Lechner (ITA)	24	20	10	12	16	13	11	23		4	9	14	16	DNS	8	9	175
13	Alicia Franck (BEL)	15	17	20	13	11	14	26	12		16	16	16	DNS	10	10	11	157
14	Silvia Persico (ITA)	27	16	15	15	9	DNS	17	27		10	17	9	17	DNS	5	7	149
15	Ceylin del Carmen Alvarado (NED)	DNS	DNS	DNS	3	14	4	5	DNS		DNS	14	5	9	DNS	DNS	10	146
16	Maghalie Rochette (CAN)	10	7	22	DNS	DNS	10	DNS	2		3	23	10	Ret	10	DNS	DNS	139
17	Yara Kastelijn (NED)	9	9	9	9	7	17	9	DNS		DNS	19	DNS	Ret	17	DNS	16	139
18	Manon Bakker (NED)	21	27	29	14	20	18	18	13		DNS	12	17	10	12	7	18	132
19	Sanne Cant (BEL)	19	25	14	24	19	DNS	12	18		8	8	21	7	20	DNS	13	130
20	Aniek van Alphen (NED)	13	23	16	11	18	19	24	DNS		DNS	15	15	13	21	13	17	120
21	Alice Maria Arzuffi (ITA)	18	19	25	10	17	15	13	45		7	18	Ret	22	DNS	DNS	DNS	96
22	Marion Norbert-Riberolle (BEL)	39	DNS	27	27	21	23	15	14		DNS	28	18	15	14	9	19	86
23	Line Burquier (FRA)	DNS	DNS	DNS	8	6	DNS	DNS	10		DNS	DNS	12	DNS	15	DNS	22	83
24	Perrine Clauzel (FRA)	28	DNS	23	17	27	DNS	14	17		DNS	11	23	21	Ret	15	21	72
25	Amandine Fouquenet (FRA)	DNS	DNS	DNS	DNS	10	DNS	23	15		DNS	DNS	19	DNS	DNS	11	15	63
26	Gaia Realini (ITA)	11	15	17	DNS	DNS	16	DNS	DNS		20	DNS	27	24	DNS	DNS	28	53
27	Katie Clouse (USA)	23	18	DNS	DNS	DNS	22	28	9		DNS	26	26	19	19	DNS	DNS	46
28	Jolanda Neff (SUI)	4	12	19	DNS	DNS	DNS	DNS	DNS		DNS	DNS	DNS	DNS	DNS	DNS	DNS	43
29	Anna Kay (GBR)	DNS	DNS	DNS	DNS	DNS	DNS	21	22		DNS	13	20	DNS	13	DNS	Ret	41
30	Marthe Truyen (BEL)	DNS	DNS	DNS	18	40	27	20	28		DNS	21	30	30	DNS	20	23	28
31	Anaïs Morichon (FRA)	DNS	DNS	DNS	DNS	34	DNS	16	25		DNS	DNS	25	DNS	DNS	12	25	27
32	Laura Verdonschot (BEL)	DNS	DNS	DNS	Ret	DNS	DNS	25	32		DNS	20	Ret	28	22	14	24	25
33	Kateřina Nash (CZE)	20	10	24	DNS	DNS	DNS	DNS	DNS		DNS	DNS	DNS	DNS	DNS	DNS	DNS	24
34	Kristyna Zemanova (CZE)	DNS	DNS	DNS	DNS	DNS	20	DNS	DNS		DNS	DNS	DNS	26	DNS	18	20	20
35	Rebecca Gariboldi (ITA)	DNS	DNS	DNS	22	DNS	DNS	DNS	26		11	DNS	DNS	DNS	DNS	DNS	DNS	19
36	Caroline Mani (FRA)	30	22	18	DNS	DNS	DNS	DNS	19		DNS	Ret	Ret	DNS	DNS	DNS	DNS	19
37	Sidney McGill (CAN)	33	34	33	DNS	DNS	32	41	33		12	45	29	48	40	22	DNS	18
38	Lucía González Blanco (ESP)	DNS	DNS	DNS	26	24	28	30	DNS		DNS	24	34	34	23	16	DNS	17
39	Ellen Van Loy (BEL)	22	29	31	28	28	DNS	27	30		DNS	25	33	33	26	17	33	14
40	Christine Majerus (LUX)	DNS	DNS	DNS	DNS	DNS	DNS	DNS	DNS		DNS	DNS	22	18	24	DNS	DNS	14
41	Marie Schreiber (LUX)	34	24	39	34	Ret	21	35	20		DNS	DNS	51	39	25	DNS	27	14
42	Anne Tauber (NED)	DNS	DNS	DNS	DNS	DNS	DNS	DNS	DNS		13	DNS	DNS	DNS	DNS	DNS	DNS	13
43	Olivia Onesti (FRA)	DNS	DNS	DNS	21	23	26	33	24		DNS	DNS	24	27	32	25	DNS	13
44	Nadja Heigl (AUT)	DNS	DNS	DNS	DNS	DNS	40	DNS	DNS		14	DNS	DNS	61	49	DNS	DNS	12
45	Madigan Munro (USA)	25	21	DNS	DNS	DNS	DNS	DNS	DNS		DNS	44	28	20	34	DNS	DNS	12
46	Kiona Crabbé (BEL)	DNS	DNS	DNS	37	37	39	29	35		15	38	47	29	DNS	DNS	38	11
47	Suzanne Verhoeven (BEL)	DNS	DNS	DNS	23	45	25	31	DNS		DNS	33	DNS	38	DNS	19	34	11
48	Lucia Bramati (ITA)	43	36	43	30	DNS	31	37	38		18	30	43	53	DNS	24	40	10
49	Zoe Bäckstedt (GBR)	DNS	DNS	DNS	20	26	J	22	DNS		DNS	DNS	J	J	27	DNS	DNS	10
50	Alessia Bulleri (ITA)	DNS	DNS	DNS	DNS	DNS	DNS	DNS	DNS		17	DNS	DNS	DNS	DNS	DNS	DNS	9
51	Francesca Baroni (ITA)	DNS	DNS	DNS	DNS	DNS	44	DNS	31		19	DNS	Ret	DNS	DNS	DNS	DNS	7
52	Maud Kaptheijns (NED)	DNS	DNS	DNS	19	DNS	DNS	DNS	44		DNS	DNS	52	DNS	DNS	DNS	35	7
53	Lauriane Duraffourg (FRA)	DNS	DNS	DNS	38	25	DNS	34	21		DNS	DNS	53	DNS	DNS	DNS	DNS	6
54	Viviane Rognant (FRA)	DNS	DNS	DNS	DNS	DNS	DNS	DNS	DNS		DNS	DNS	DNS	42	DNS	21	DNS	5
55	Letizia Borghesi (ITA)	DNS	DNS	DNS	DNS	DNS	DNS	DNS	DNS		21	DNS	DNS	DNS	DNS	DNS	DNS	5
56	Raylyn Nuss (USA)	26	30	21	DNS	DNS	33	DNS	DNS		DNS	42	46	32	42	DNS	DNS	5
57	Anne Terpstra (NED)	DNS	DNS	DNS	DNS	DNS	DNS	DNS	DNS		22	DNS	DNS	DNS	DNS	DNS	DNS	4
58	Leonie Bentveld (NED)	DNS	DNS	DNS	DNS	22	J	32	DNS		DNS	DNS	J	J	DNS	J	29	4
59	Aida Nuño (ESP)	DNS	DNS	DNS	DNS	DNS	DNS	DNS	DNS		DNS	DNS	DNS	DNS	DNS	23	26	3
60	Solenne Billouin (FRA)	DNS	DNS	DNS	DNS	DNS	DNS	DNS	DNS		DNS	DNS	DNS	23	33	DNS	DNS	3
61	Carlotta Borello (ITA)	DNS	DNS	DNS	DNS	DNS	30	DNS	DNS		23	DNS	DNS	DNS	DNS	DNS	DNS	3
62	Ronja Eibl (GER)	DNS	DNS	DNS	DNS	DNS	DNS	DNS	DNS		24	DNS	32	DNS	DNS	DNS	DNS	2
63	Millie Couzens (GBR)	DNS	DNS	DNS	29	32	24	Ret	DNS		DNS	DNS	DNS	DNS	DNS	DNS	DNS	2
64	Lotte Kopecky (BEL)	DNS	DNS	DNS	DNS	DNS	DNS	DNS	DNS		DNS	DNS	DNS	25	29	DNS	DNS	1
65	Zina Barhoumi (SUI)	DNS	DNS	DNS	31	31	DNS	DNS	36		25	DNS	DNS	DNS	DNS	DNS	DNS	1
66	Mie Bjørndal Ottestad (NOR)	DNS	DNS	DNS	25	39	DNS	DNS	DNS		DNS	DNS	DNS	DNS	DNS	DNS	DNS	1

=== U23 men ===
Pos.	Rider	TAB (Czech Republic)	NAM (Belgium)	DEN (Belgium)	FLA (France)	Total Points
1	Mees Hendrikx (NED)	1	3	3	3	115
2	Pim Ronhaar (NED)	8	1	2	4	110
3	Emiel Verstrynghe (BEL)	5	4	5	1	104
4	Cameron Mason (GBR)	3	5	1	DNS	86
5	Ryan Kamp (NED)	2	DNS	9	2	77
6	Jente Michels (BEL)	7	6	6	DNS	59
7	Gerben Kuypers (BEL)	DNS	8	8	5	57
8	Niels Vandeputte (BEL)	13	2	13	DNS	56
9	Anton Ferdinande (BEL)	4	7	11	DNS	56
10	Loris Rouiller (SUI)	6	12	DNS	6	54
11	Witse Meeussen (BEL)	9	9	7	DNS	53
12	Joran Wyseure (BEL)	DNS	13	4	13	48
13	Antoine Huby (FRA)	12	18	DNS	7	41
14	Théo Thomas (FRA)	30	10	42	9	33
15	Joris Delbove (FRA)	DNS	20	15	10	33
16	Thibau Nys (BEL)	10	Ret	10	DNS	32
17	Matěj Stránský (CZE)	17	22	17	18	30
18	Lennert Belmans (BEL)	DNS	11	12	DNS	29
19	Davide Toneatti (ITA)	11	16	47	28	25
20	Tibor Del Grosso (NED)	14	23	16	DNS	25
21	Corran Carrick-Anderson (GBR)	15	14	30	DNS	23
22	Martin Groslambert (FRA)	35	19	DNS	11	22
23	Rémi Lelandais (FRA)	DNS	Ret	DNS	8	18
24	Ugo Ananie (FRA)	DNS	DNS	26	1	14
25	Toby Barnes (GBR)	20	DNS	18	DNS	14
26	Clément Alleno (FRA)	DNS	DNS	DNS	14	12
27	Ben Chilton (GBR)	DNS	DNS	14	DNS	12
28	Danny van Lierop (NED)	19	24	23	DNS	12
29	Louis Sparfel (FRA)	DNS	DNS	DNS	15	11
30	Filippo Fontana (ITA)	28	15	28	DNS	11
31	Thibault Valognes (FRA)	DNS	DNS	DNS	16	10
32	Dario Lillo (SUI)	16	DNS	DNS	DNS	10
33	Rory McGuire (GBR)	DNS	17	25	DNS	10
34	Samuele Leone (ITA)	DNS	DNS	DNS	17	9
35	Matyáš Fiala (CZE)	22	35	38	21	9
36	Joseph Blackmore (GBR)	18	DNS	DNS	DNS	8
37	Cyprien Gilles (FRA)	DNS	DNS	DNS	19	7
38	Luke Verburg (NED)	DNS	Ret	19	DNS	7
39	Gonzalo Inguanzo (ESP)	DNS	DNS	DNS	20	6
40	Sander De Vet (BEL)	DNS	DNS	20	DNS	6
41	Scott Funston (USA)	DNS	25	21	DNS	6
42	Andrew Strohmeyer (USA)	DNS	21	39	DNS	5
43	Jakub Říman (CZE)	21	33	29	DNS	5
44	Alain Suárez (ESP)	31	45	44	22	4
45	Bailey Groenendaal (NED)	29	26	22	DNS	4
46	Timothe Gabriel (FRA)	DNS	DNS	DNS	23	3
47	Robert Hula (CZE)	23	DNS	40	DNS	3
48	Javier Zaera (ESP)	DNS	DNS	DNS	24	2
49	Lars Sommer (SUI)	DNS	29	24	DNS	2
50	Nathan Bommenel (FRA)	24	DNS	DNS	DNS	2
51	Miguel Rodríguez Novoa (ESP)	DNS	DNS	DNS	25	1
52	Jean-Luc Halter (SUI)	25	34	Ret	DNS	1

=== Junior men ===
Pos.	Rider	TAB (Czech Republic)	NAM (Belgium)	DEN (Belgium)	FLA (France)	Total Points
1	David Haverdings (NED)	1	1	1	1	160
2	Louka Lesueur (FRA)	5	4	4	2	95
3	Nathan Smith (GBR)	2	13	2	DNS	73
4	Corentin Lequet (FRA)	17	3	10	4	72
5	Kenay De Moyer (BEL)	8	2	5	DNS	69
6	Viktor Vandenberghe (BEL)	6	6	3	DNS	65
7	Yordi Corsus (BEL)	3	7	8	DNS	62
8	Luca Paletti (ITA)	7	16	43	3	54
9	Ben Askey (GBR)	4	DNS	6	DNS	42
10	Kay De Bruyckere (BEL)	13	8	16	DNS	41
11	Nathan Dos Reis Graca (FRA)	11	18	DNS	9	40
12	Václav Ježek (CZE)	16	9	15	24	40
13	Guus van den Eijnden (NED)	15	14	14	DNS	35
14	Niels Ceulemans (BEL)	DNS	11	7	DNS	34
15	Jan Christen (SUI)	21	15	9	DNS	33
16	Menno Huising (NED)	10	40	11	DNS	31
17	Romain Debord (FRA)	DNS	10	DNS	12	30
18	Max Greensill (GBR)	20	5	DNS	DNS	27
19	Jelte Jochems (NED)	9	23	20	DNS	26
20	Esteban Foucher (FRA)	DNS	DNS	DNS	5	21
21	Hippolyte Loete (FRA)	DNS	DNS	DNS	6	20
22	Matthias Schwarzbacher (SVK)	18	27	24	16	20
23	Fantin Gloux (FRA)	DNS	DNS	27	7	19
24	Guillaume Bagou (FRA)	DNS	44	33	8	18
25	František Hojka (CZE)	DNS	19	28	15	18
26	Tommaso Cafueri (ITA)	DNS	36	57	10	16
27	Ondřej Novotný (CZE)	22	DNS	46	14	16
28	Martin Orriere (FRA)	DNS	DNS	31	11	15
29	Frank O'Reilly (USA)	DNS	34	12	DNS	14
30	Bjoern Koerdt (GBR)	DNS	12	DNS	DNS	14
31	Léo Bisiaux (FRA)	12	DNS	DNS	DNS	14
32	Samuele Scappini (ITA)	DNS	DNS	51	13	13
33	Joseph Smith (GBR)	DNS	28	13	DNS	13
34	Jari Prins (NED)	14	48	29	DNS	12
35	Andrew August (USA)	DNS	24	17	DNS	11
36	Gabriel Gouessant (FRA)	DNS	DNS	DNS	17	9
37	Luke Valenti (CAN)	DNS	17	40	DNS	9
38	Bart Kortleve (NED)	DNS	20	23	DNS	9
39	Mika Vijfvinkel (NED)	23	25	21	DNS	9
40	Antoine Clef (FRA)	DNS	DNS	DNS	18	8
41	Aaron Dockx (BEL)	40	Ret	18	DNS	8
42	Robbe Dhondt (BEL)	DNS	22	22	DNS	8
43	Raúl Mira Bonastre (ESP)	DNS	DNS	39	19	7
44	Silas Kuschla (GER)	26	56	19	DNS	7
45	Patrik Černý (CZE)	19	33	DNS	DNS	7
46	Justin Coron (FRA)	DNS	DNS	DNS	20	6
47	Gorka Corres Ibanez De Opakua (ESP)	DNS	DNS	DNS	21	5
48	Elian Paccagnella (ITA)	35	21	32	DNS	5
49	Ricardo Buba Sopko (ESP)	DNS	DNS	DNS	22	4
50	Ivan Gomar Millet (ESP)	DNS	DNS	DNS	23	3
51	Callum Laborde (GBR)	24	DNS	DNS	DNS	2
52	Morgan Guerin (FRA)	42	58	55	25	1
53	Jack Spranger (USA)	DNS	DNS	25	DNS	1
54	Filippo Borello (ITA)	25	DNS	DNS	DNS	1

=== Junior women ===
Pos.	Rider	TAB (Czech Republic)	NAM (Belgium)	DEN (Belgium)	FLA (France)	Total Points
1	Leonie Bentveld (NED)	2	2	2	1	130
2	Zoe Bäckstedt (GBR)	1	1	1	DNS	120
3	Lauren Molengraaf (NED)	6	5	5	4	84
4	Federica Venturelli (ITA)	3	9	8	5	81
5	Valentina Corvi (ITA)	20	3	9	2	78
6	Kateřina Hladíková (CZE)	4	8	15	3	76
7	Eliška Hanáková (CZE)	18	6	4	6	70
8	Julia Kopecky (CZE)	13	12	10	8	61
9	Vanda Dlasková (CZE)	16	14	7	10	57
10	Xaydee van Sinaey (BEL)	9	15	3	DNS	53
11	Lilou Fabregue (FRA)	5	13	DNS	7	51
12	Monique Halter (SUI)	8	4	DNS	DNS	40
13	Ava Holmgren (CAN)	DNS	7	6	DNS	39
14	Manon Briand (FRA)	DNS	16	17	11	34
15	Margot Marasco (FRA)	26	27	11	15	26
16	Beatrice Fontana (ITA)	17	11	27	DNS	24
17	Alizée Rigaux (FRA)	DNS	19	22	13	24
18	Fleur Moors (BEL)	15	22	19	DNS	22
19	Jana Glaus (SUI)	22	10	DNS	DNS	20
20	Malwina Mul (POL)	11	21	DNS	DNS	20
21	Ella Maclean-Howell (GBR)	7	DNS	DNS	DNS	19
22	Alexandra Valade (FRA)	DNS	DNS	21	12	19
23	Barbora Jeřábková (CZE)	24	DNS	14	22	18
24	Lise Klaes (FRA)	DNS	DNS	DNS	9	17
25	Electa Gallezot (FRA)	10	DNS	DNS	DNS	16
26	Alma Johansson (SWE)	Ret	23	13	DNS	16
27	Katherine Sarkisov (USA)	DNS	DNS	12	DNS	14
28	Mirre Knaven (NED)	12	Ret	Ret	DNS	14
29	Leane Delanoe (FRA)	DNS	DNS	DNS	14	12
30	Nienke Vinke (NED)	14	DNS	31	DNS	12
31	Maurene Tregouet (FRA)	DNS	DNS	DNS	16	10
32	Chloe Fraser (USA)	DNS	DNS	16	DNS	10
33	Marta Beti Perez (ESP)	DNS	DNS	DNS	17	9
34	Isabella Holmgren (CAN)	DNS	17	29	DNS	9
35	Febe De Smedt (BEL)	27	25	18	DNS	9
36	Camille Giraud (FRA)	DNS	30	DNS	18	8
37	Emily Carrick-Anderson (GBR)	DNS	18	32	DNS	8
38	Jenaya Francis (CAN)	DNS	20	24	DNS	8
39	Loane Menager (FRA)	DNS	DNS	DNS	19	7
40	Julie Bego (FRA)	19	DNS	DNS	DNS	7
41	Adele Hurteloup (FRA)	DNS	DNS	DNS	20	6
42	Elsa Westenfelder (USA)	DNS	26	20	DNS	6
43	Maria Modenes Garcia De Motiloa (ESP)	DNS	DNS	40	21	5
44	Elisa Viezzi (ITA)	21	DNS	DNS	DNS	5
45	Roxanne Porlier (FRA)	DNS	DNS	DNS	23	3
46	Pem Hoefmans (NED)	DNS	32	23	DNS	3
47	Cleo Kiekens (BEL)	23	34	35	DNS	3
48	Nahia Arana Quintanilla (ESP)	DNS	DNS	DNS	24	2
49	Jule Märkl (GER)	DNS	24	37	DNS	2
50	Laura Maria Mira Juarez (ESP)	DNS	DNS	DNS	25	1
51	Karla Nováková (CZE)	DNS	DNS	25	DNS	1
52	Elizabeth McKinnon (GBR)	25	DNS	DNS	DNS	1
