= Pan American Cyclo-cross Championships =

International cycling competition

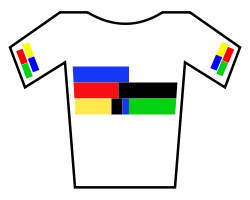
- Champion's jersey

Race details
- Date: October/November
- Discipline: Cyclo-cross
- Organiser: Union Cycliste Internationale

History
- First edition: 2014

The Pan American Cyclo-cross Championships are the continental cycling championships for cyclo-cross held annually for member nations of the Pan American Cycling Confederation. Riders competing in the championships are selected by the national governing body. The championships were first held in 2014 and have taken place annually since except for in 2020.

== Locations ==
Year	Country	City
2014	United States	Covington, Kentucky
2015	United States	Covington, Kentucky
2016	United States	Cincinnati
2017	United States	Louisville, Kentucky
2018	Canada	Midland, Ontario
2019	Canada	Midland, Ontario
2021	United States	Garland, Texas
2022	United States	Falmouth, Massachusetts
2023	United States	Missoula, Montana
2024	United States	Missoula, Montana
2025	United States	Washington, D.C.
2026	United States	Washington, D.C.

== Winners ==
=== Men ===
==== Elite ====
Year	Gold	Silver	Bronze
2015	(United States) Jeremy Powers	(United States) Jamey Driscoll	(United States) Stephen Hyde
2016	(United States) Stephen Hyde	(United States) Jeremy Powers	(United States) Daniel Summerhill
2017	(United States) Stephen Hyde	(United States) Tobin Ortenblad	(Canada) Michael van den Ham
2018	(United States) Curtis White	(Canada) Michael van den Ham	(United States) Kerry Werner
2019	(United States) Kerry Werner	(United States) Curtis White	(United States) Jamey Driscoll
2020	Cancelled		
2021	(United States) Eric Brunner	(United States) Curtis White	(United States) Kerry Werner
2022	(United States) Eric Brunner	(United States) Curtis White	(United States) Lance Haidet
2023	(United States) Eric Brunner	(United States) Scott Funston	(United States) Gage Hecht
2024	(United States) Eric Brunner	(United States) Curtis White	(United States) Andrew Strohmeyer

==== Under-23 ====
Year	Gold	Silver	Bronze
2014	(United States) Curtis White	(United States) Logan Owen	(United States) Andrew Dillman
2015	(United States) Andrew Dillman	(United States) Curtis White	(United States) Tobin Ortenblad
2016	(United States) Curtis White	(United States) Gage Hecht	(United States) Spencer Petrov
2017	(United States) Gage Hecht	(United States) Eric Brunner	(United States) Cooper Willsey
2018	(United States) Gage Hecht	(United States) Eric Brunner	(United States) Cooper Willsey
2019	(United States) Gage Hecht	(United States) Lane Maher	(United States) Eric Brunner
2020	Cancelled		
2021	(United States) Scott Funston	(Canada) Tyler Clark	(United States) Andrew Strohmeyer
2022	(United States) Jack Spranger	(United States) Andrew Strohmeyer	(United States) Daxton Mock
2023	(Canada) Ian Ackert	(Canada) Luke Valenti	(United States) Jules Van Kempen
2024	(Canada) Ian Ackert	(United States) Jack Spranger	(United States) Henry Coote

==== Junior ====
Year	Gold	Silver	Bronze
2014	(United States) Gage Hecht	(United States) Gavin Haley	(United States) Christopher Blevins
2015	(United States) Spencer Petrov	(United States) Gage Hecht	(United States) Eric Brunner
2016	(United States) Denzel Stephenson	(Canada) Gunnar Holmgren	(United States) Lane Maher
2017	(United States) Benjamin Gomez-Villafañe	(United States) Lane Maher	(United States) Alex Morton
2018	(United States) Magnus Sheffield	(United States) Nick Carter	(Canada) Carter Woods
2019	(United States) Andrew Strohmeyer	(United States) Nick Carter	(Canada) Matthew Leliveld
2020	Cancelled		
2021	(United States) Jack Spranger	(Canada) Ian Ackert	(United States) Magnus White
2022	(United States) David Thompson	(United States) Magnus White	(Canada) Ian Ackert
2023	(United States) David Thompson	(United States) Henry Coote	(United States) Luke Walter
2024	(United States) Gareth Beshore	(United States) Benjamin Bravman	(Canada) Emilien Belzile

=== Women ===
==== Elite ====
Year	Gold	Silver	Bronze
2014	(United States) Katie Compton	(United States) Meredith Miller	(United States) Georgia Gould
2015	(United States) Katie Compton	(United States) Kaitlin Antonneau	(United States) Rachel Lloyd
2016	(United States) Katie Compton	(United States) Crystal Anthony	(Canada) Maghalie Rochette
2017	(United States) Katie Compton	(United States) Kaitlin Keough	(Canada) Christel Ferrier-Bruneau
2018	(Canada) Maghalie Rochette	(United States) Ellen Noble	(United States) Kaitlin Keough
2019	(Canada) Maghalie Rochette	(United States) Clara Honsinger	(United States) Rebecca Fahringer
2020	Cancelled		
2021	(United States) Raylyn Nuss	(Canada) Ruby West	(United States) Caitlin Bernstein
2022	(United States) Raylyn Nuss	(Canada) Sidney McGill	(Canada) Maghalie Rochette
2023	(Canada) Isabella Holmgren	(United States) Clara Honsinger	(United States) Katie Clouse
2024	(Canada) Sidney McGill	(Canada) Isabella Holmgren	(United States) Katie Clouse

==== Under-23 ====
Year	Gold	Silver	Bronze
2014	(Canada) Maghalie Rochette	(United States) Allison Arensman	(United States) Laurel Rathbun
2015	(United States) Ellen Noble	(United States) Allison Arensman	(United States) Hannah Finchamp
2016	(United States) Ellen Noble	(United States) Emma White	(United States) Hannah Finchamp
2017	(United States) Emma White	(United States) Clara Honsinger	(United States) Katie Clouse
2018	(United States) Clara Honsinger	(Canada) Ruby West	(United States) Katie Clouse
2019	(Canada) Ruby West	(Canada) Dana Gilligan	(Canada) Sidney McGill
2020	Cancelled		
2021	(United States) Madigan Munro	(United States) Lauren Zoerner	(United States) Cassidy Hickey
2022	(United States) Lizzy Gunsalus	(United States) Lauren Zoerner	(United States) Cassidy Hickey
2023	(United States) Lauren Zoerner	(Canada) Ava Holmgren	(Canada) Jenaya Francis
2024	(United States) Lauren Zoerner	(Canada) Jenaya Francis	(United States) Kaya Musgrave

==== Junior ====
Year	Gold	Silver	Bronze
2019	(United States) Madigan Munro	(United States) Lizzy Gunsalus	(United States) Lauren Zoerner
2020	Cancelled		
2021	(Canada) Ava Holmgren	(United States) Chloe Fraser	(Canada) Isabella Holmgren
2022	(Canada) Ava Holmgren	(United States) Vida Lopez De San Roman	(Canada) Isabella Holmgren
2023	(Canada) Rafaëlle Carrier	(United States) Vida Lopez De San Roman	(United States) Jorja Bond
2024	(United States) Alyssa Sarkisov	(Canada) Rafaelle Carrier	(Canada) Aislin Hallahan

== Medal table ==
Rank	Nation	Gold	Silver	Bronze	Total
1	United States	43	41	41	125
2	Canada	11	13	13	37
Totals (2 entries)		54	54	54	162
