= Cyclo-cross Fayetteville =

American Cyclo-cross race

The Cyclo-cross Fayetteville is a cyclo-cross race held in Fayetteville, Arkansas in the United States, which is since 2021 part of the UCI Cyclo-cross World Cup.

== Past winners ==
=== Men ===
Year	Country	Rider	Team
2019	United States	Kerry Werner	
2021	Belgium	Quinten Hermans	Tormans CX Team
2022	Belgium	Eli Iserbyt	Pauwels Sauzen–Bingoal

=== Women ===
Year	Country	Rider	Team
2019	Canada	Maghalie Rochette	
2021	Netherlands	Lucinda Brand	Baloise–Trek Lions
2022	Netherlands	Fem Van Empel	Pauwels Sauzen–Bingoal
