= Rochester Cyclocross =

Annual cyclo-cross race in New York State

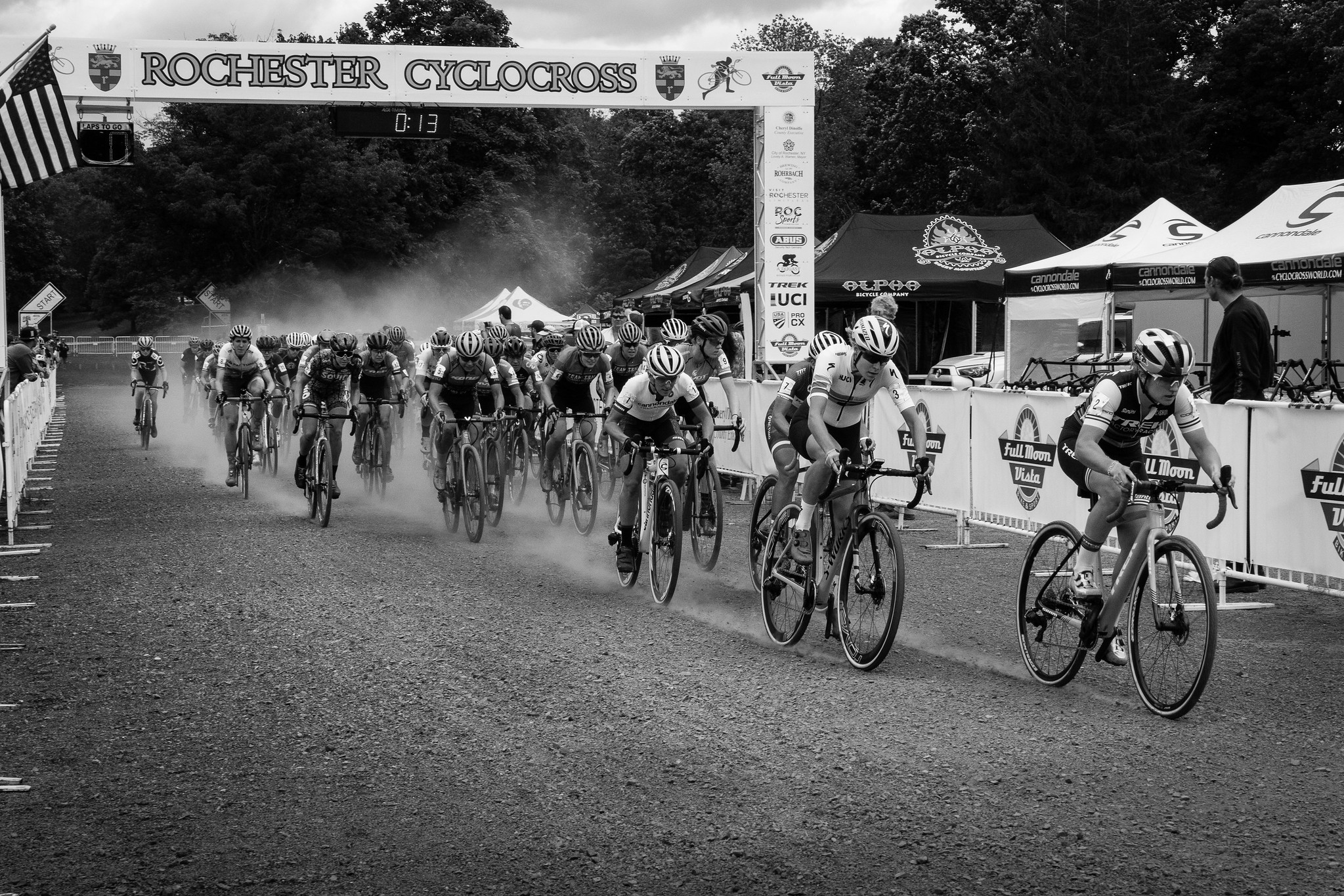

Race details
- Region: Rochester, United States
- Discipline: Cyclo-cross
- Organiser: Full Moon Vista
- Race director: Shana Lydon
- Web site: rochestercyclocross.com

History
- First edition: 2008
- Most wins: Men: Vincent Baestaens (4) Women: Maghalie Rochette (4)

Rochester Cyclocross is a cyclo-cross race held annually in Genesee Valley Park in Rochester, New York. It was founded and organized by Full Moon Vista Cycling and is currently the second of four stops on USA Cycling's USCX cup series.

== History ==
=== First editions ===
The inaugural race was held in 2008 as a one day, amateur event, and was the first cyclocross race to take place in a Monroe County park. The 2009 edition saw considerably larger turnout, but remained an amateur event.

=== UCI application and expanded races ===
In 2010, Rochester Cyclocross was awarded a UCI international event, taking place on Sunday. 2012 saw the race expand to Saturday and Sunday. Saturday was elevated to Class C1 in 2014.

In 2016, the event moved from Ellison Park to its current location in Genesee Valley Park. Since then, it has followed the same format - C1 races on Saturday, C2 races on Sunday, with amateur events taking place the morning of each day.

== Course layout and features ==
Since its move to Genesee Valley Park, the three kilometer course has remained largely the same. The race layout takes advantage of the park's natural terrain and proximity to the Erie Canal, both of which offer some unique features. However, the course contains a number of classic cyclocross obstacles; wooden plank barriers, flyover, and Belgian staircase.

Some of the technical elements include a two meter, near-vertical dirt run-up, single-track, and several hairpin turns atop a steep bridge embankment. Rochester is famous for its "Double Trouble" section - a highly technical section combining a rugged downhill, hairpin turn, and steep uphill along the bank of the Canal. For Sunday's races, this and other technical sections are run reverse.

== Winners ==
=== Men ===
Year	Country	Rider	Team
2025	United States	Eric Brunner (cyclist)	Competitive Edge Racing
2024	United States	Andrew Strohmeyer	Kelly Benefit Strategies Elite
2023	Belgium	Vincent Baestaens	Splits CX Team
2022	Belgium	Vincent Baestaens	Splits CX Team
2021	Belgium	Vincent Baestaens	Deschacht-hens-maes
2020	No race due to Covid Pandemic		
2019	Belgium	Vincent Baestaens	Group Hens - Maes containers
2018	United States	Stephen Hyde (cyclist)	Cannondale P/B Cyclocrossworld.com
2017	United States	Stephen Hyde (cyclist)	Cannondale P/B Cyclocrossworld.com
2016	United States	Jeremy Powers	Aspire Racing
2015	United States	Jeremy Powers	Aspire Racing
2014	United States	Jeremy Powers	Rapha Focus

=== Women ===
Year	Country	Rider	Team
2025	Netherlands	Manon Bakker	Crelan-Corendon
2024	France	Helene Clauzel	UVCA Troyes
2023	Canada	Maghalie Rochette	Canyon Collective
2022	Netherlands	Annemarie Worst	777 CX Team
2021	Canada	Maghalie Rochette	Specialized / Feedback Sports
2020	No race due to Covid pandemic		
2019	Canada	Maghalie Rochette	Specialized / Feedback Sports
2018	Canada	Maghalie Rochette	CXFever p/b Specialized
2017	United States	Ellen Noble	Aspire Racing
2016	United States	Kaitlin Keough	Cannondale pb CyclocrossWorld.com
2015	United States	Kaitlin Keough	Cannondale pb CyclocrossWorld.com
2014	France	Caroline Mani	Raleigh / Clement

== Photos ==
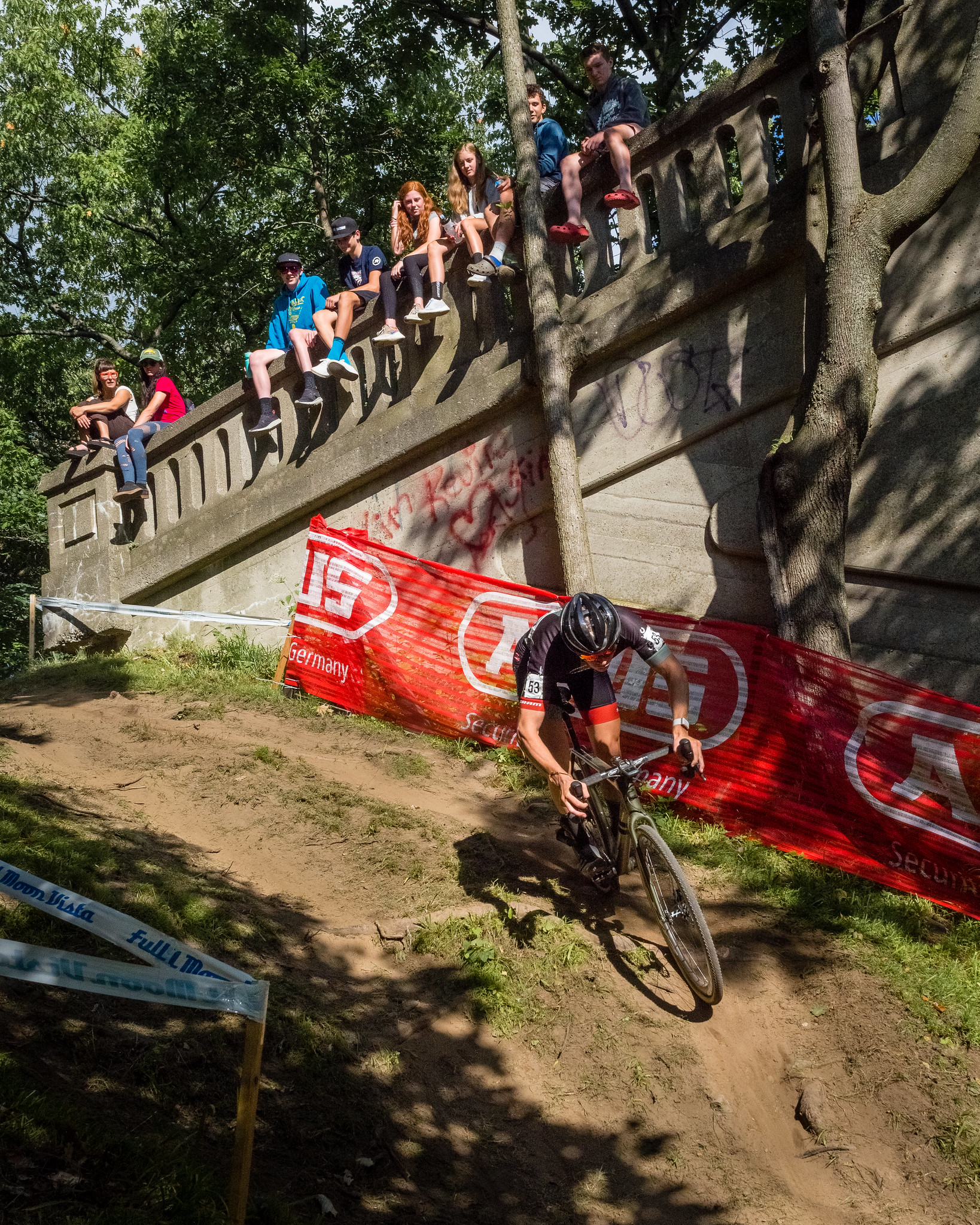

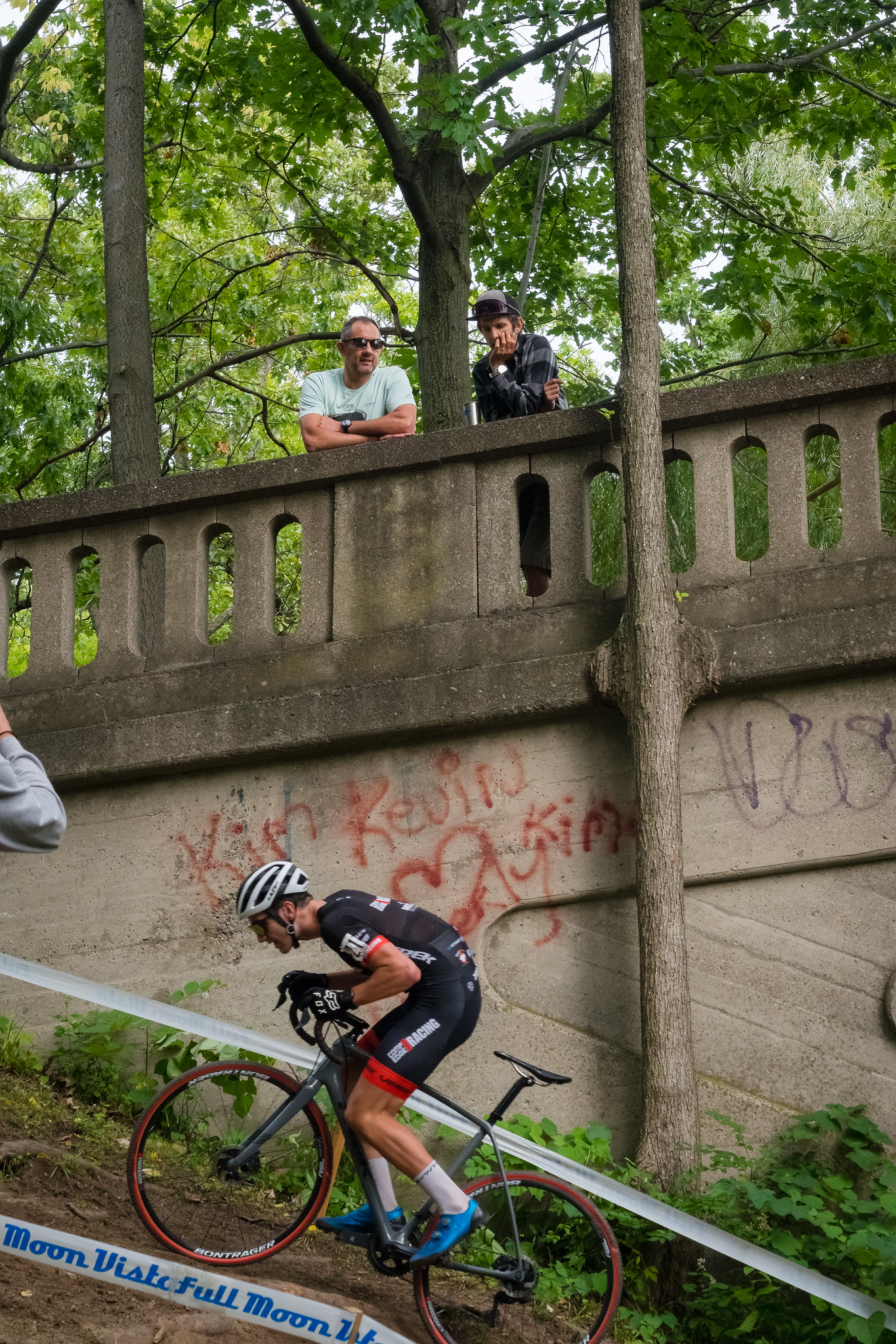

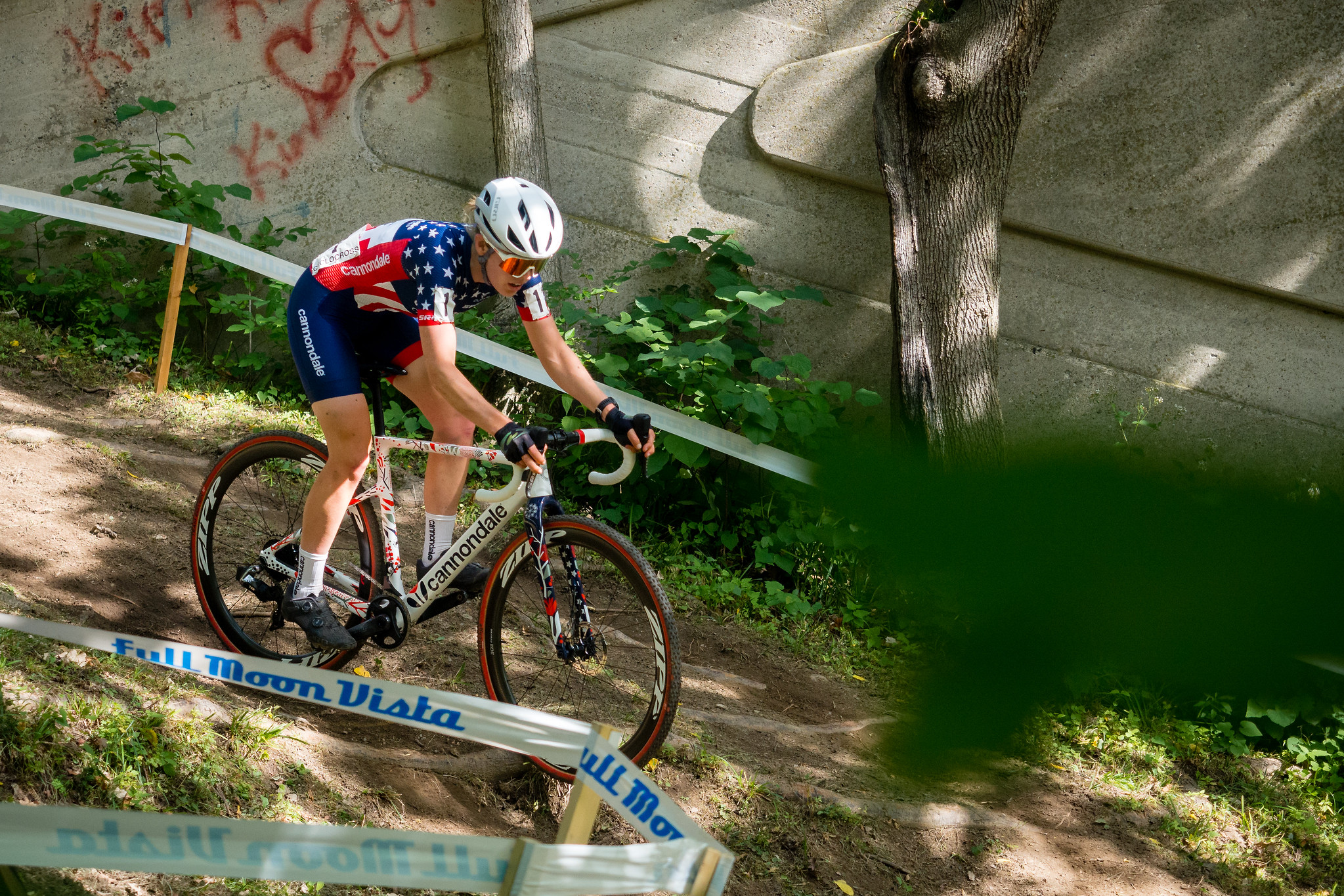

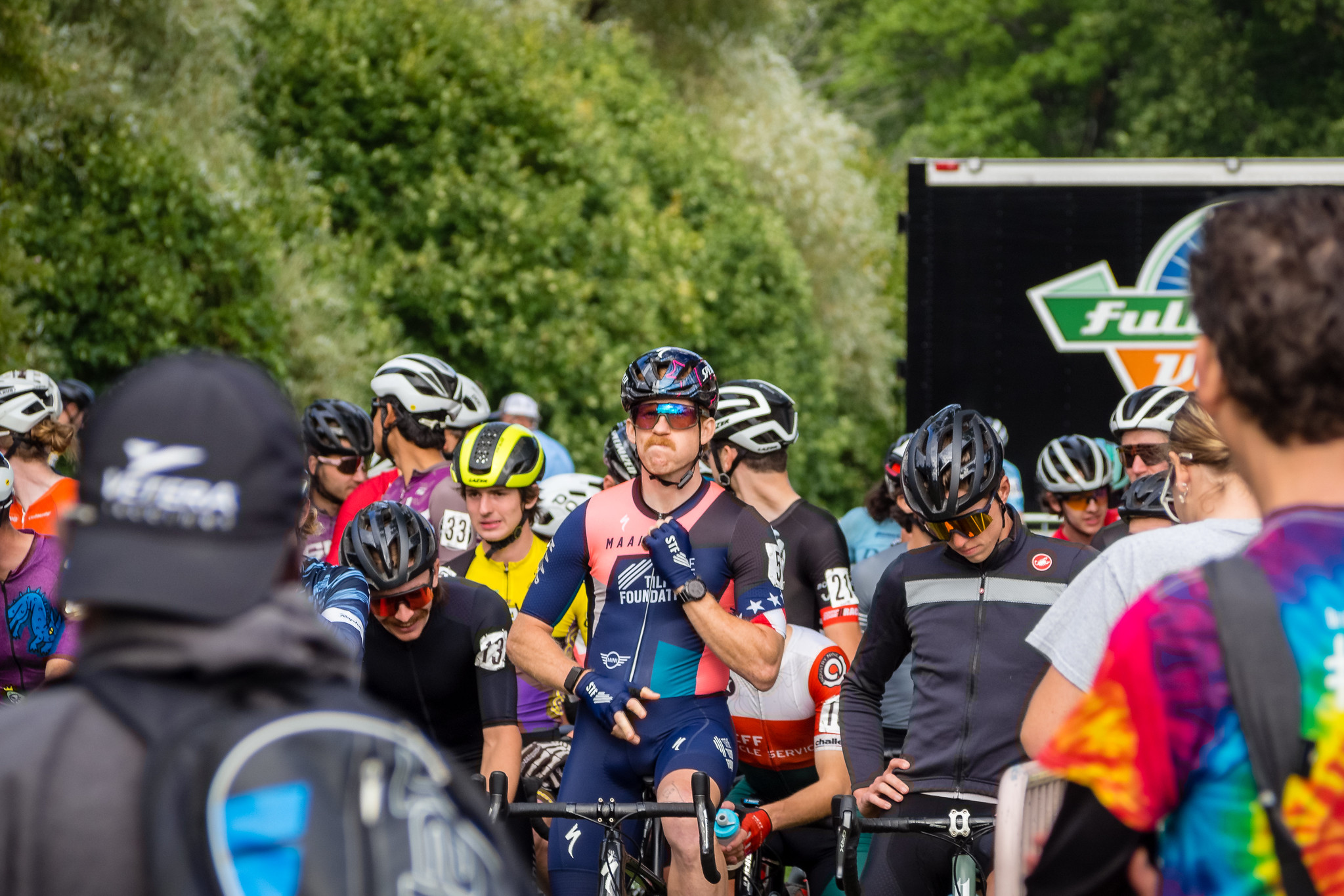

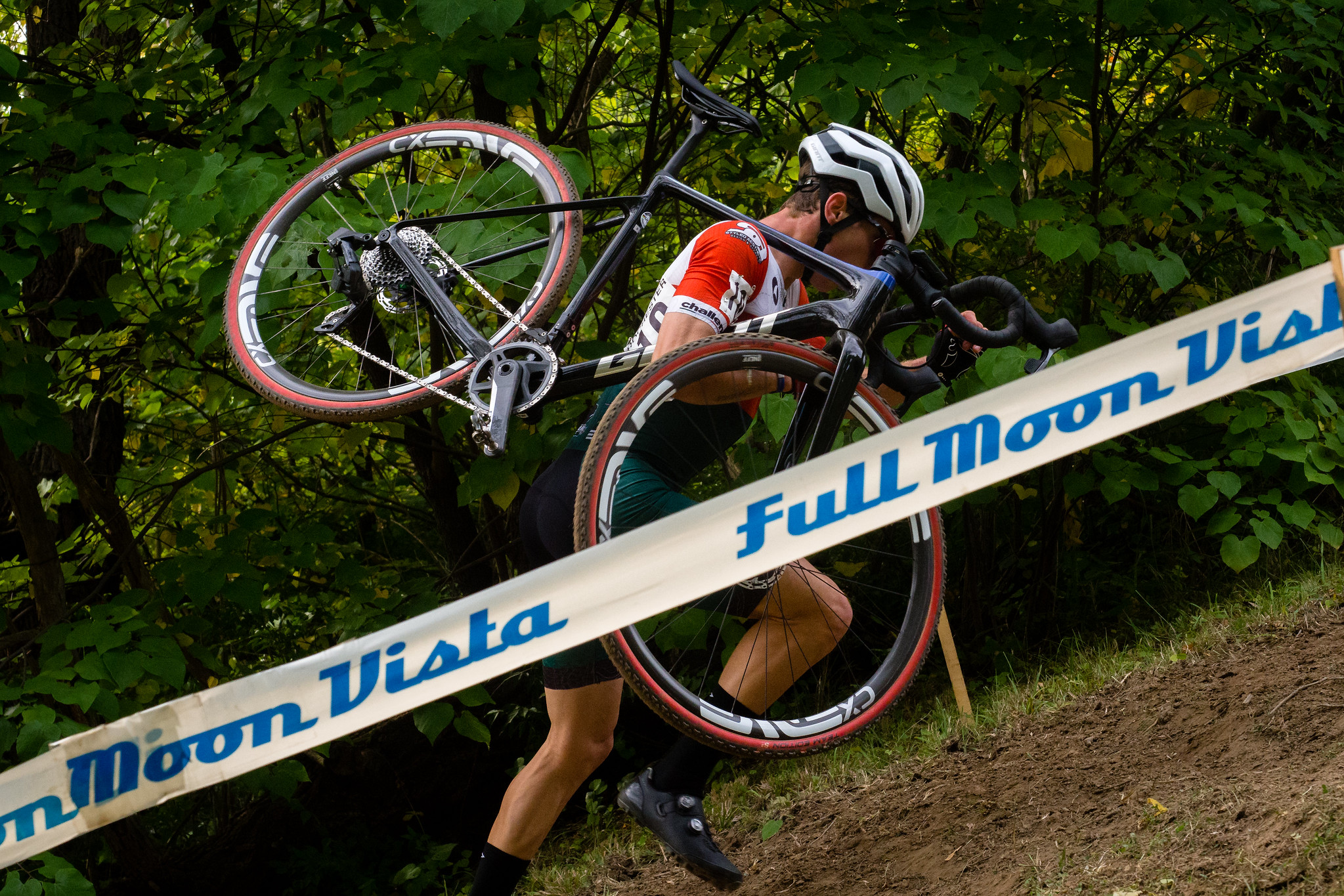

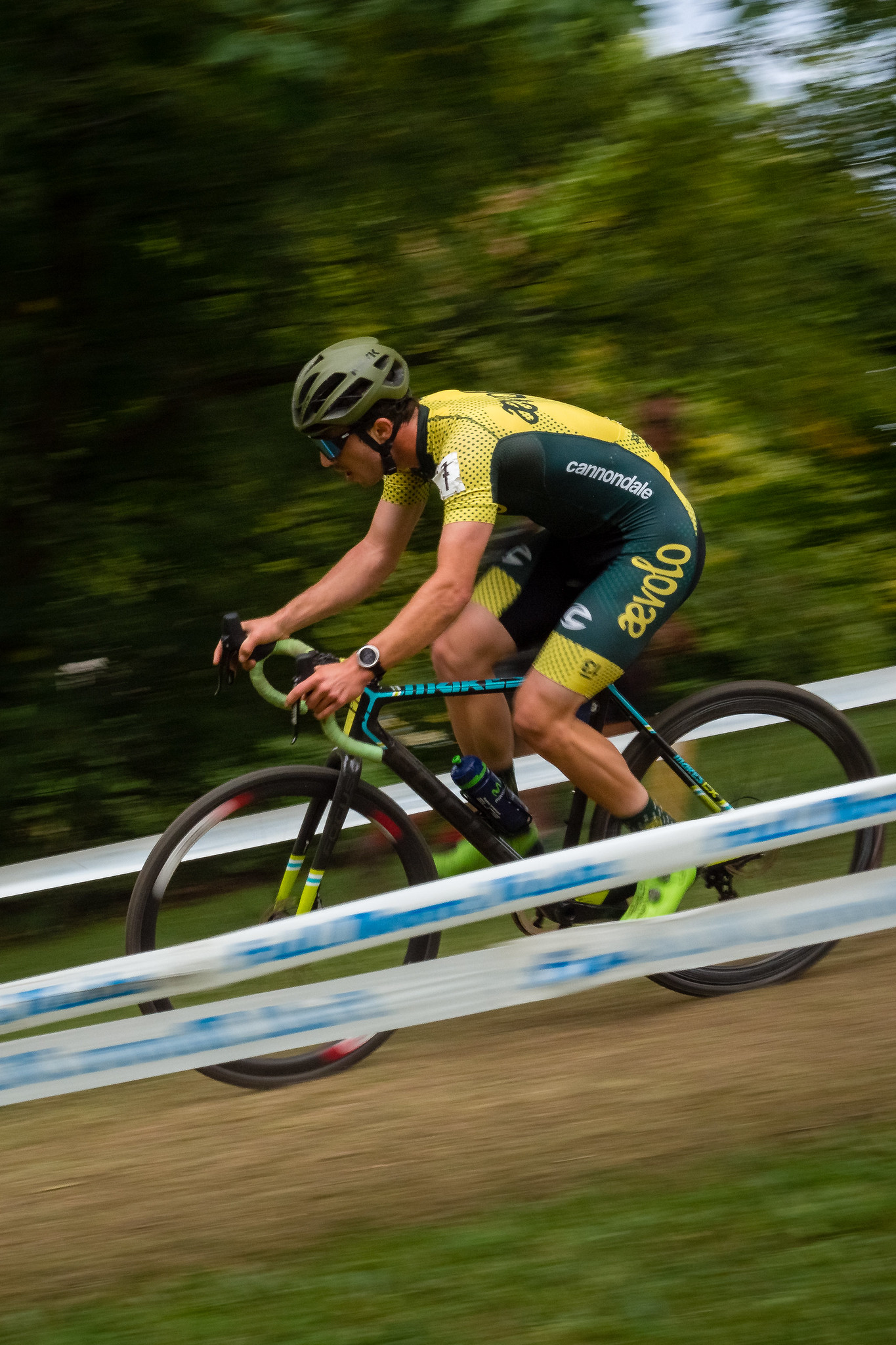

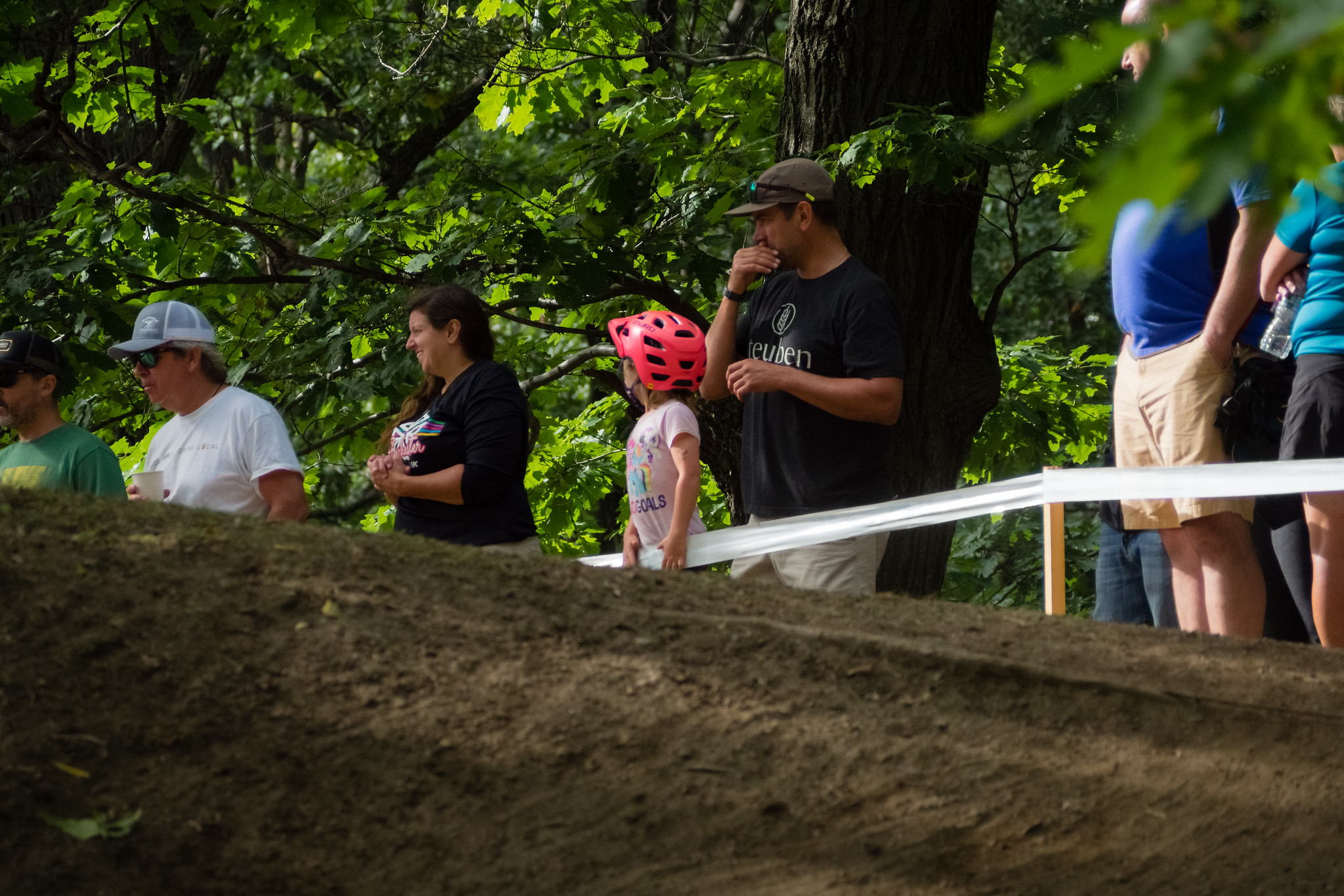

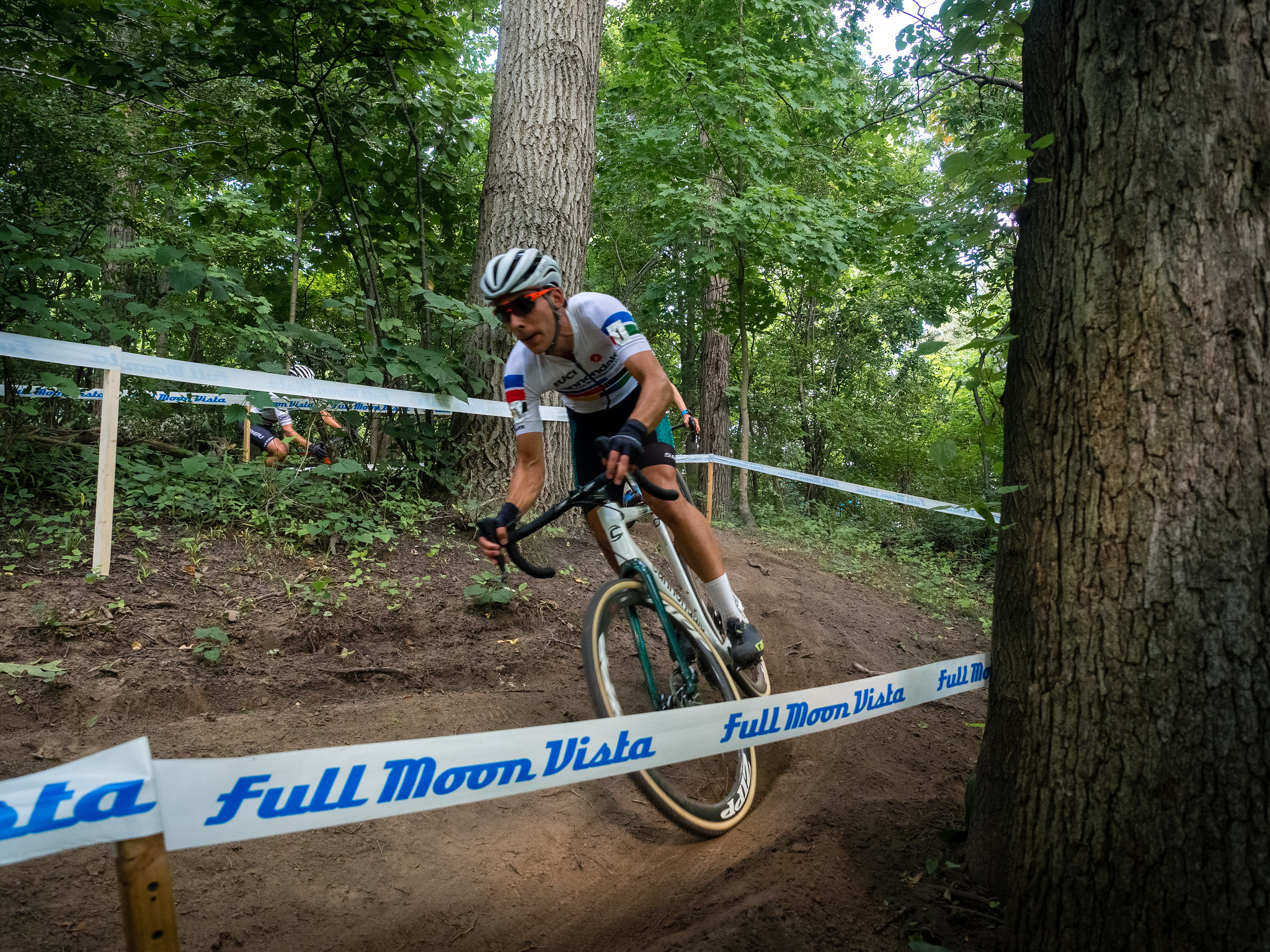

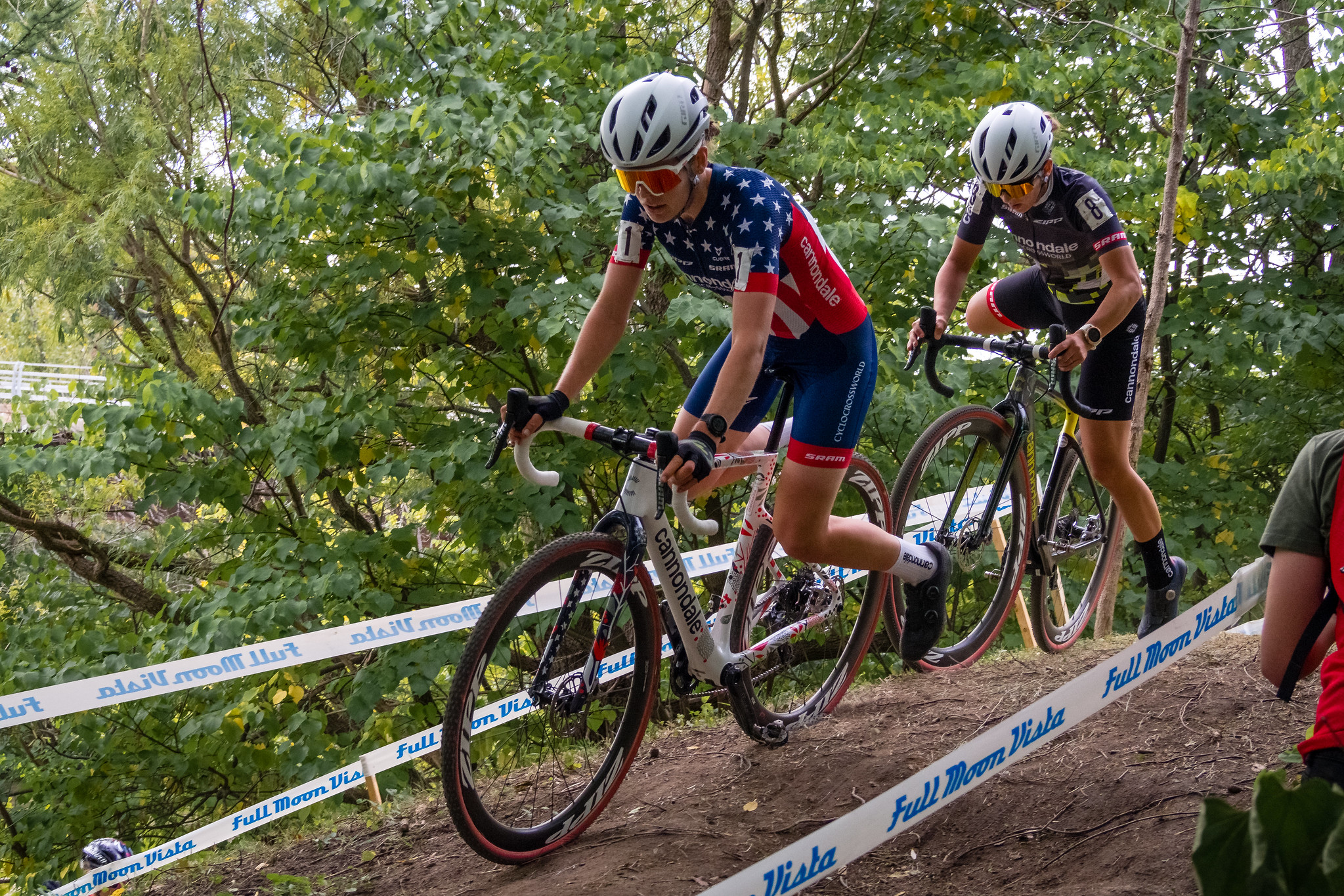

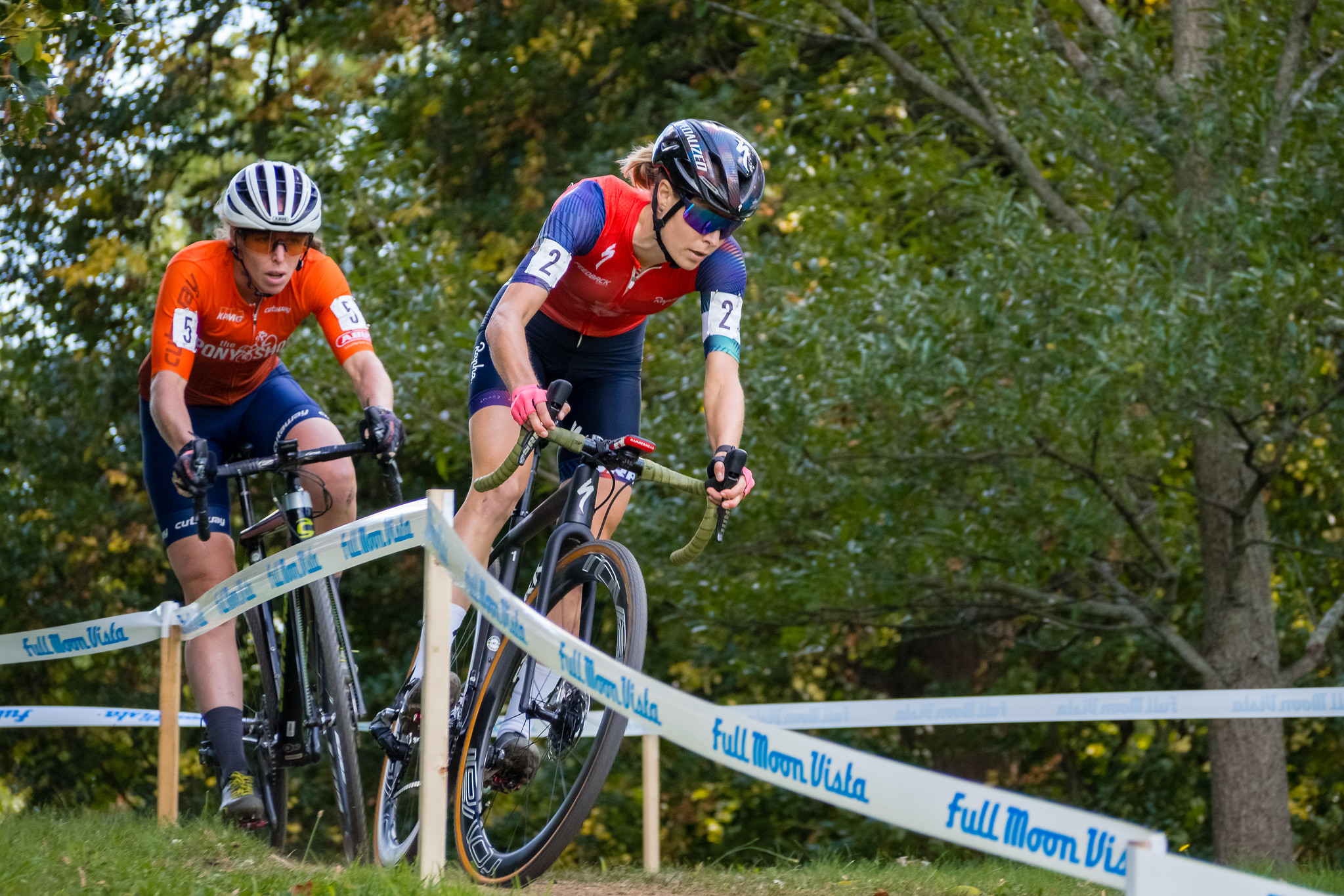
