= Arensman =

Arensman is a surname. Notable people with the name include:

- Allison Arensman (born 1994), American cyclist
- Thymen Arensman (born 1999), Dutch cyclist
