= Quinten Hermans =

Belgian cyclist (born 1995)

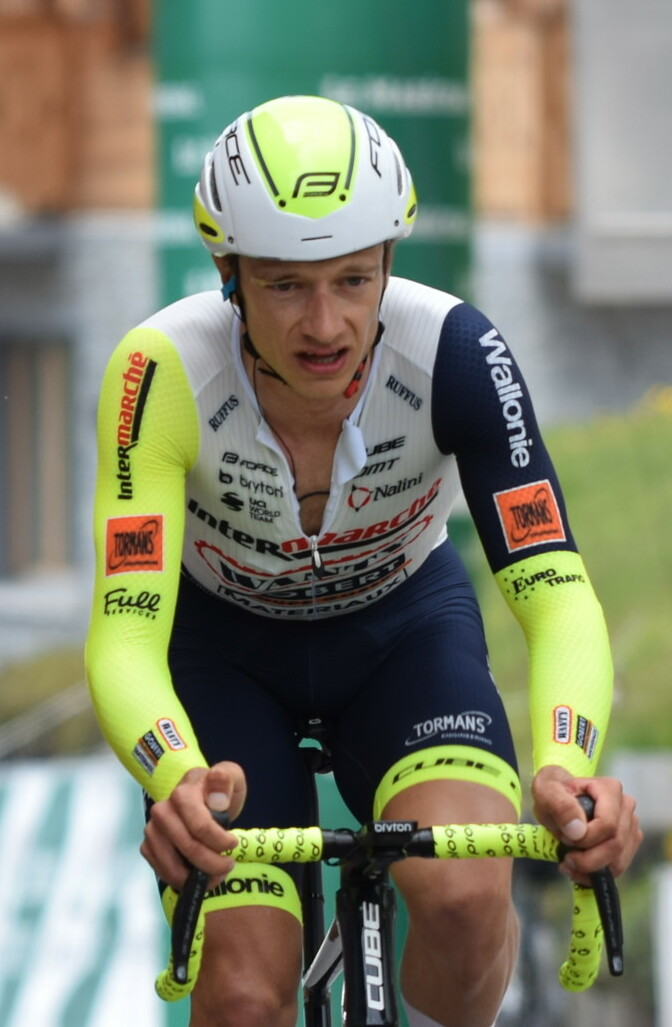
- Hermans in 2022

Personal information
- Full name: Quinten Hermans
- Born: 29 July 1995 (age 31) Turnhout, Belgium
- Height: 1.74 m (5 ft 9 in)
- Weight: 62 kg (137 lb)

Cycling career
- Sport: Cycling
- Current team: Pinarello–Q36.5 Pro Cycling Team
- Disciplines: Cyclo-cross; Road
- Rider type: Puncheur

Amateur team
- 2013: Young Telenet–Fidea

Professional teams
- 2014–2019: Telenet–Fidea
- 2020–2022: Tormans CX Team (cyclo-cross)
- 2020–2022: Circus–Wanty Gobert (road)
- 2023–2025: Alpecin–Deceuninck
- 2026–: Pinarello–Q36.5 Pro Cycling Team

Major wins
- Cyclo-cross World Cup 1 individual win (2021–22)
Medal record
Representing Belgium
Men's cyclo-cross
World Championships
Bronze medal – third place	2016 Heusden-Zolder	Under-23
European Championships
Gold medal – first place	2015 Huijbergen	Under-23
Gold medal – first place	2016 Pontchâteau	Under-23
Silver medal – second place	2021 Wijster	Elite
Men's gravel bicycle racing
World Championships
Bronze medal – third place	2024 Flanders	Elite

Quinten Hermans (born 29 July 1995) is a Belgian road and cyclo-cross who currently rides for UCI ProTeam Pinarello–Q36.5 Pro Cycling Team.

Starting his career in cyclo-cross, he won the 2015 and 2016 European Under-23 Cyclo-cross Championships, as well as taking home the bronze medal in the men's under-23 event at the 2016 UCI Cyclo-cross World Championships in Heusden-Zolder. He won his first UCI Cyclo-cross World Cup race in Fayetteville in 2021.

Since 2023, Hermans has raced primarily on the road. His most notable achievements are winning stage 3 of the 2024 Tour of the Basque Country and placing second at the 2022 Liège–Bastogne–Liège.

In 2024, he won the bronze medal at the UCI Gravel World Championships in Flanders.

== Major results ==
=== Road ===
2018 (1 pro win)
1st Stage 4 Oberösterreich Rundfahrt
2nd Overall Tour de Wallonie

1st Points classification
1st Young rider classification
1st Stage 4

3rd Internationale Wielertrofee Jong Maar Moedig
8th Overall Tour of Belgium
2019
1st Overall Flèche du Sud

1st Points classification
1st Prologue, Stages 1 & 2

3rd Dwars door het Hageland
7th Overall Tour de Wallonie
2021
6th Overall Tour de Wallonie
2022 (1)
2nd Liège–Bastogne–Liège
3rd Overall Tour of Belgium

1st Stage 4

3rd Hamburg Cyclassics
6th Ronde van Limburg
8th Overall Arctic Race of Norway
9th Route Adélie
2023
3rd Antwerp Port Epic
8th Overall Deutschland Tour
2024 (1)
1st Stage 3 Tour of the Basque Country
6th Brabantse Pijl
6th Dwars door het Hageland
7th Grand Prix de Wallonie
2025
4th Dwars door het Hageland
6th Grand Prix Cycliste de Québec
6th Super 8 Classic
7th Figueira Champions Classic
8th Gran Piemonte
2026
2nd Brabantse Pijl
4th Road race, National Championships
4th La Drôme Classic
5th Overall Renewi Tour
5th Overall Tour of Belgium
5th Gran Piemonte
7th Veneto Classic

==== Grand Tour general classification results timeline ====
Grand Tour	2021	2022	2023	2024
Giro d'Italia	43	—	—	53
Tour de France	—	—	113	—
Vuelta a España	—	—	—	80

Legend
—	Did not compete
DNF	Did not finish

=== Gravel ===
2023
6th UCI World Championships
2024
3rd UCI World Championships

=== Cyclo-cross ===
2011–2012
1st Junior Leudelange
2nd Junior Antwerpen
3rd National Junior Championships
4th UCI World Junior Championships
2012–2013
UCI Junior World Cup

2nd Tábor
2nd Plzeň
2nd Koksijde

2nd Overall Junior Superprestige

2nd Ruddervoorde
2nd Zonhoven
2nd Hamme
2nd Gavere
2nd Gieten
3rd Diegem

Junior Bpost Bank Trophy

2nd Ronse
3rd Baal

2nd National Junior Championships
2nd Junior Kalmthout
2013–2014
Under-23 Superprestige

3rd Zonhoven

3rd Pétange
3rd Financne
2014–2015
National Trophy Series

2nd Southampton

UCI Under-23 World Cup

3rd Koksijde

3rd Under-23 Middelkerke
3rd Under-23 Essen
3rd National Under-23 Championships
2015–2016
1st UEC European Under-23 Championships
2nd Overall UCI Under-23 World Cup

1st Hoogerheide
2nd Lignières-en-Berry
3rd Namur
4th Cauberg
4th Heusden-Zolder

1st Overall Under-23 Bpost Bank Trophy

1st Koppenberg
1st Essen
1st Antwerpen
1st Baal
2nd Loenhout

2nd Overall Under-23 Superprestige

1st Diegem
2nd Gieten
2nd Zonhoven
2nd Ruddervoorde
2nd Gavere
2nd Middelkerke
3rd Hoogstraten
3rd Spa-Francorchamps

2nd Under-23 Sluitingsprijs
3rd UCI World Under-23 Championships
3rd National Under-23 Championships
2016–2017
1st UEC European Under-23 Championships
1st National Under-23 Championships
2nd Overall UCI Under-23 World Cup

2nd Namur
3rd Zeven
3rd Rome
3rd Hoogerheide

1st Overall Under-23 Superprestige

1st Zonhoven
1st Ruddervoorde
1st Diegem
1st Spa-Francorchamps
2nd Gieten
2nd Gavere
2nd Middelkerke
3rd Hoogstraten

1st Overall Under-23 DVV Trophy

1st Hamme
1st Antwerpen
1st Lille
2nd Essen
3rd Baal

2nd Under-23 Overijse
2nd Under-23 Oostmalle
3rd Waterloo
2017–2018
EKZ CrossTour

1st Meilen

Soudal Classics

2nd Neerpelt
3rd Sint-Niklaas

2nd Iowa City
UCI World Cup

3rd Iowa City

Brico Cross

3rd Kruibeke
3rd Bredene

3rd Pétange
2018–2019
1st Waterloo
EKZ CrossTour

2nd Hittnau
2nd Eschenbach
3rd Meilen

Brico Cross

2nd Bredene
3rd Meulebeke

Soudal Classics

2nd Sint-Niklaas

3rd La Meziere
UCI World Cup

4th Waterloo
4th Iowa City
5th Bern
5th Tábor

2019–2020
Ethias Cross

1st Beringen
1st Essen
3rd Eeklo
3rd Kruibeke

Superprestige

2nd Gieten
2nd Boom

Rectavit Series

2nd Neerpelt
2nd Sint-Niklaas

DVV Trophy

2nd Lille

UCI World Cup

3rd Heusden-Zolder
4th Bern
5th Koksijde

3rd Wachtebeke
2020–2021
Ethias Cross

1st Eeklo
2nd Essen

X²O Badkamers Trophy

2nd Brussels

2nd Oostmalle
UCI World Cup

5th Namur

2021–2022
UCI World Cup

1st Fayetteville
3rd Waterloo
3rd Tábor
4th Koksijde
4th Rucphen
4th Namur
5th Iowa City
5th Zonhoven
5th Overijse
5th Val di Sole
5th Dendermonde

2nd UEC European Championships
Superprestige

2nd Gieten
2nd Ruddervoorde
2nd Merksplas
3rd Niel

3rd National Championships
3rd Gullegem
2022–2023
1st Ardooie
2nd Woerden
UCI World Cup

5th Zonhoven
5th Tábor
