= Kerry Werner =

American cyclist

Personal information
- Born: March 27, 1991 (age 35) Yakima, Washington, U.S.

Cycling career
- Sport: Cycling
- Disciplines: Cyclo-cross, Road, MTB
- Role: Rider

Professional teams
- 2014–2016: Optum–Kelly Benefit Strategies
- 2018: Kona Maxxis Shimano

Kerry Werner (born March 27, 1991) is an American cyclist who rides for the Kona Maxxis Shimano cyclocross team and previously rode for Rally Cycling.

== Major results ==
=== Cyclo-cross ===
2012–2013
North Carolina Grand Prix

1st Race 2
2nd Race 1

Supercross Cup

1st Day 2
3rd Day 1

2013–2014
2nd Kingsport Cup
3rd Days 1 & 2, Supercross Cup
2014–2015
1st Races 1 & 2, North Carolina Grand Prix
1st Baystate - NECX
Supercross Cup

1st Day 2
3rd Day 1

NEPCX - NBX Gran Prix

2nd Day 2
3rd Day 1

3rd Race 3, Jingle Cross
2015–2016
2nd Kingsport Cup
2nd Day 1, Supercross
2016–2017
1st Races 1 & 2, DCCX
2nd Race 1, Charm City Cross
3rd National Championships
3rd Ruts n' Guts Day 2
3rd Derby City Cup
2017–2018
1st Race 2, Rochester
1st Races 1 & 2, North Carolina Grand Prix
1st Races 1 & 2, DCCX
1st Day 1, Supercross
2nd Ruts n' Guts Day 1
3rd National Championships
3rd Derby City Cup
2018–2019
1st Cincinnati - Carter Park
1st Race 1, Nittany Lion Cross
1st Race 1, North Carolina Grand Prix
1st Races 1 & 2, Deschutes Brewery's GO Cross
1st Races 1 & 2, DCCX
Charm City Cross

1st Race 1
2nd Race 2

2nd Days 1 & 2, Supercross
Rochester

2nd Race 1
3rd Race 2

3rd Pan American Championships
3rd NBX GP of Cross 1
3rd Cincinnati UCI Cyclocross - Devou Park
2019–2020
1st Pan American Championships
1st Races 1 & 2, North Carolina Grand Prix
1st Race 1, Charm City Cross
Virginia's Blue Ridge GO Cross

1st Race 2
2nd Race 1

FayetteCross

1st Race 1
3rd Race 2

DCCX

1st Race 1
2nd Race 2

Cincinnati - Kingswood Park

1st Race 1
2nd Race 2

2021–2022
1st Overall USCX Series

1st Mason II
2nd Iowa City II
2nd Baltimore I
2nd Mason I
2nd Rochester I
3rd Rochester II

1st Hendersonville II
2nd Hendersonville I
2nd Roanoke I
2nd Roanoke II
3rd Pan American Championships
3rd Waterloo
2022–2023
1st Hendersonville I
1st Hendersonville II
3rd National Championships
USCX Series

3rd Roanoke I

3rd Baltimore II
2023–2024
2nd Hendersonville I
2nd Hendersonville II
2024–2025
USCX Series

1st Waterloo I
2nd Waterloo II
2nd Roanoke I
2nd Roanoke II
