= Gage Hecht =

American cyclist (born 1998)

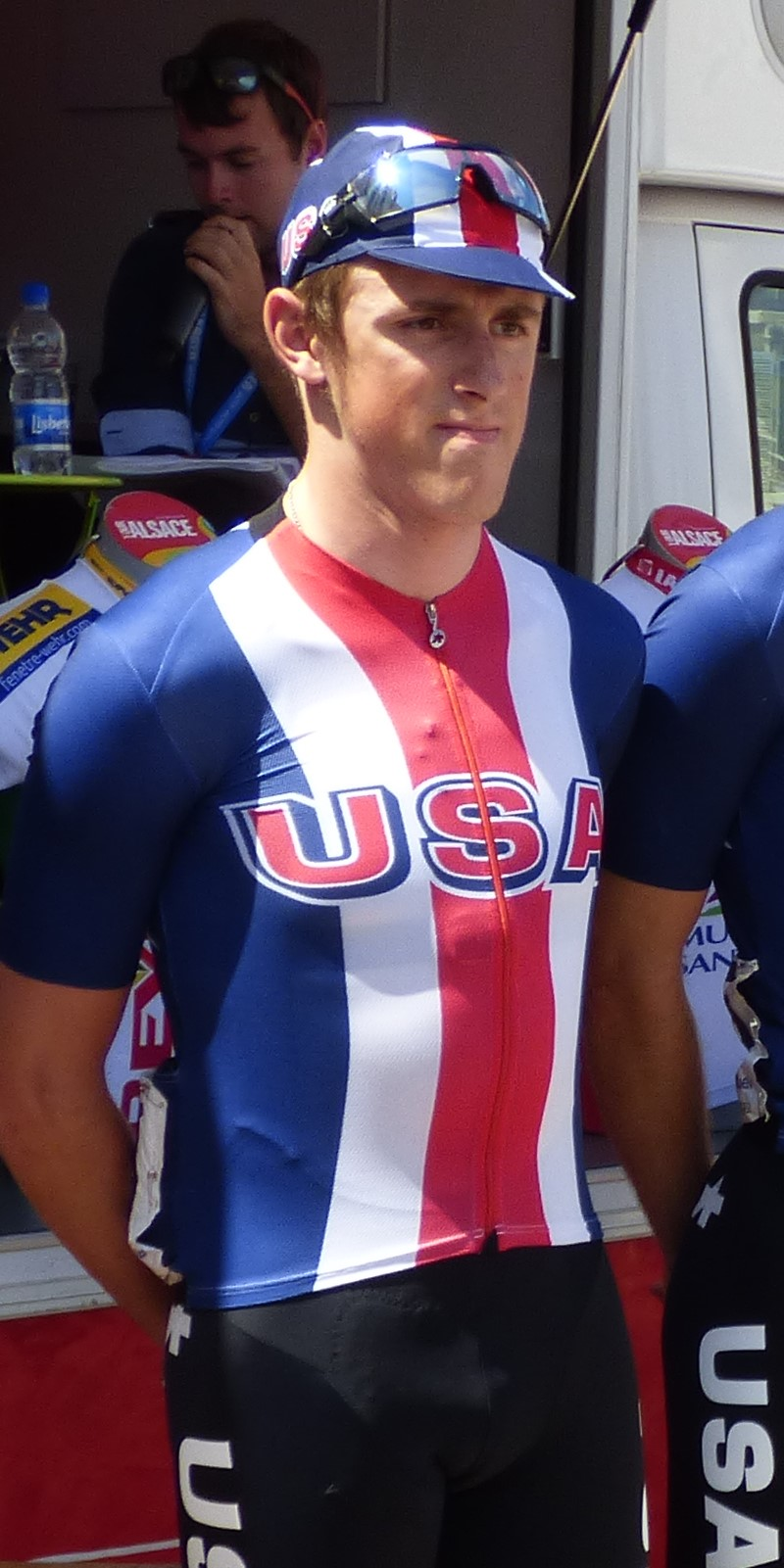

Personal information
- Born: February 18, 1998 (age 28) Colorado, United States
- Height: 1.8 m (5 ft 11 in)
- Weight: 72 kg (159 lb)

Cycling career
- Sport: Cycling
- Current team: Velocius Sport
- Disciplines: Road; Cyclo-cross
- Role: Rider

Amateur team
- 2024–: Velocius Sport

Professional teams
- 2017–2021: Aevolo
- 2022–2023: Human Powered Health

Gage Hecht (born February 18, 1998) is an American cyclist, who currently rides for club team Velocius Sport. Hecht is the founder of the Waffle House Tour bicycle event.

== Major results ==
=== Road ===
2015
National Junior Road Championships

2nd Road race
3rd Time trial

2016
National Junior Road Championships

1st Road race
3rd Time trial

2017
1st Stage 4 Redlands Bicycle Classic
2nd Road race, National Under-23 Road Championships
2018
1st Time Trial, National Under-23 Road Championships
1st Stage 1 Colorado Classic
5th Time trial, National Road Championships
6th Chrono Kristin Armstrong
2019
2nd Time trial, National Under-23 Road Championships
6th Chrono Kristin Armstrong
2021
2nd Overall Joe Martin Stage Race

1st Stage 3 (ITT)

2nd Schwalbe TCM HLB van Daal Eurode Omloop

=== Cyclo-cross ===
2014–2015
1st Pan American Junior Championships
1st National Junior Championships
1st Providence Junior CX Festival
1st Duinencross Koksijde Juniors
2nd Azencross Juniors
2015–2016
1st National Junior Championships
2nd Pan American Junior Championships
2016–2017
1st US Open of Cyclocross Under-23
2nd Pan American Under-23 Championships
2nd National Under-23 Championships
2017–2018
1st Pan American Under-23 Championships
1st US Open of Cyclocross Under-23 Day 1 & 2
1st Major Taylor 'Cross Cup Day 1
2nd Major Taylor 'Cross Cup Day 2
2nd Harbin Park International
2nd Derby City Cup
2nd Ruts n' Guts Day 2
3rd Ruts n' Guts Day 1
2018–2019
1st Pan American Under-23 Championships
1st Silver Goose Cyclocross Festival
Cincinnati UCI Cyclocross

1st Devou Park
2nd Carter Park

1st US Open of Cyclocross Day 1
1st Ruts 'n' Guts 1 & 2
1st Resolution 'Cross Cup 1 & 2
3rd National Championships
2019–2020
1st National Championships
1st Pan American Under-23 Championships
2nd Silver Goose Cyclocross Festival
2nd Cincinnati UCI Cyclocross - Kingswood Park
2nd US Open of Cyclocross Day 1 & 2
2nd FayetteCross 2
2021–2022
1st North Carolina Grand Prix Day 1
New England Series

2nd Northampton Day 1 & 2
3rd Falmouth Day 2

3rd North Carolina Grand Prix Day 2
3rd National Championships
2023–2024
3rd Pan American Championships
