= Curtis White (cyclist) =

American cyclist (born 1995)

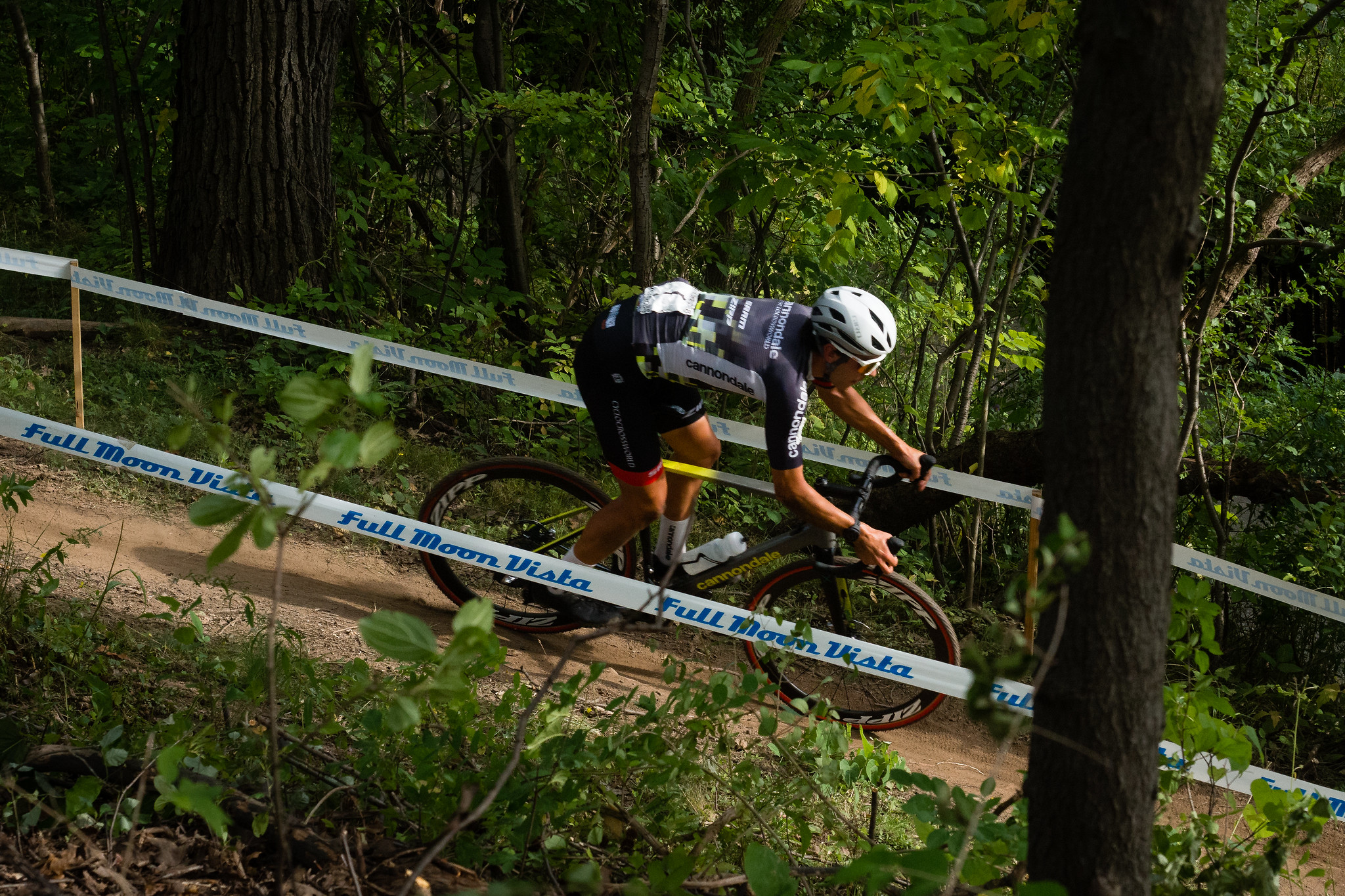
- Curtis White at Rochester Cyclocross

Personal information
- Full name: Curtis White
- Born: September 28, 1995 (age 31) Schenectady, New York, USA
- Height: 6 ft 1 in (1.85 m)
- Weight: 70 kg (154 lb)

Cycling career
- Sport: Cycling
- Current team: Steve Tilford Foundation Racing
- Disciplines: Cyclo-cross; Road
- Role: Rider
- Rider type: Sprinter

Amateur teams
- 2005: SAAB of Half-moon/CBRC
- 2006–2009: CBRC/Capital Bicycle Racing Club (road)
- 2009–2011: Clif Bar Development Cyclocross Team (cyclo-cross)
- 2010–2011: BayHill Capital/CLNoonan p/b Corner Cycle (road)
- 2012–2013: Hot Tubes Development (road)
- 2012–2014: Cannondale–Cyclocrossworld.com (cyclo-cross)
- 2014: CCB Racing

Professional teams
- 2015–2017: Optum–Kelly Benefit Strategies
- 2018: Jelly Belly–Maxxis
- 2022–: Steve Tilford Foundation Racing

Curtis White (born September 28, 1995, in Schenectady, New York, United States) is an American professional cyclist, who currently rides for Steve Tilford Foundation Racing. He is the brother of former racing cyclist Emma White.

== Major results ==
=== Cyclo-cross ===
2012–2013
2nd National Junior Championships
2014–2015
1st Pan American Under-23 Championships
1st Rounds 5, 7 & 8 Verge NECXS
2015–2016
1st Rounds 1 & 2, Charm City Cross
2nd Pan American Under-23 Championships
2016–2017
1st Pan American Under-23 Championships
1st Rounds 1 & 2, CRAFT Sportswear Gran Prix of Gloucester
1st Rounds 1 & 2, NBX Gran Prix of Cross
1st Rounds 1 & 2, The Cycle-Smart Northampton International
1st Round 2, Supercross Cup UCI Weekend
1st Round 2, KMC Cyclo-Cross Festival
2017–2018
1st Overall Vittoria Northeast Series

1st Northampton Day 1
1st Northampton Day 2
1st Suffern Day 2
2nd Suffern Day 1
2nd Warwick Day 1
3rd Warwick Day 2
3rd Gloucester Day 2

US Cup

3rd Thompson, Connecticut Day 2
3rd Cincinnati

2018–2019
1st Pan American Championships
1st Overall Vittoria Northeast Series

1st Gloucester Day 1
1st Gloucester Day 2
1st Northampton Day 1
1st Northampton Day 2
1st Suffern Day 1
1st Suffern Day 2

2nd National Championships
2nd Broken Arrow Day 1
2nd Broken Arrow Day 2
2nd Warwick Day 1
2nd Breinigsville Day 2
3rd Baltimore Day 2
3rd Breinigsville Day 1
3rd Warwick Day 2
2019–2020
Vittoria Northeast Series

1st Suffern Day 1
1st Suffern Day 2

1st Really Rad Festival Day 1
1st Really Rad Festival Day 2
1st Mason Day 2
1st Rochester Day 2
1st Baltimore Day 2
1st Fayetteville Day 2
1st Roanoke Day 1
2nd Baltimore Day 1
2nd Roanoke Day 2
2nd Pan American Championships
2nd National Championships
3rd Fayetteville Day 1
3rd Mason Day 1
2020–2021
3rd National Championships
2021–2022
1st Overall New England Series

1st Northampton Day 1
1st Northampton Day 2
2nd Falmouth Day 1
2nd Falmouth Day 2

1st Roanoke Day 1
1st Roanoke Day 2
2nd Pan American Championships
2nd National Championships
USCX Series

2nd Baltimore Day 2
2nd Mason Day 2
3rd Mason Day 1

2022–2023
1st National Championships
USCX Series

1st Baltimore Day 2
2nd Falmouth Day 1
2nd Falmouth Day 2
2nd Rochester Day 1
2nd Rochester Day 2
3rd Roanoke Day 2
3rd Baltimore Day 1

2nd Pan American Championships
2nd Northampton Day 1
3rd Northampton Day 2
2023–2024
USCX Series

1st Falmouth Day 1
1st Falmouth Day 2
3rd Baltimore Day 1
3rd Baltimore Day 2

1st Kings Day 1
1st Kings Day 2
1st Hendersonville Day 1
1st Hendersonville Day 2
5th Pan American Championships
2024–2025
2nd Kings Day 1
3rd Kings Day 2

=== Road ===
2016
1st Prologue Tour Alsace
1st Stage 1 Fitchburg Longsjo Classic
2017
1st Rochester Twilight Criterium
2018
1st Stage 2 Fitchburg Longsjo Classic
