= Eric Brunner (cyclist) =

American cyclist (born 1998)

Personal information
- Born: December 1, 1998 (age 27) Boulder, Colorado, U.S.

Cycling career
- Sport: Cycling
- Current team: Competitive Edge Racing
- Disciplines: Road; Cyclo-cross
- Role: Rider

Amateur team
- 2024: Primal–Audi Denver Elite (road)

Professional teams
- 2018–2019: 303Project
- 2019–2021: Aevolo
- 2024–: Competitive Edge Racing

Eric Brunner (born December 1, 1998) is an American cyclist, who rides for cyclo-cross team Competitive Edge Racing.

== Major results ==
=== Cyclo-cross ===
2015–2016
1st US Open of Cyclocross Juniors
3rd Pan American Junior Championships
3rd National Junior Championships
2017–2018
2nd Pan American Under-23 Championships
2nd National Under-23 Championships
2018–2019
1st Major Taylor II
2nd Pan American Under-23 Championships
3rd National Under-23 Championships
2019–2020
1st National Under-23 Championships
1st US Open II
3rd Pan American Under-23 Championships
2021–2022
1st Pan American Championships
1st National Championships
1st New England Cyclocross Series - Really Rad Festival of Cyclocross I & II
USCX Series

1st Mason I

2022–2023
1st Pan American Championships
USPCX Cyclocross

1st Really Rad Festival I
1st Really Rad Festival II
2nd Charm City Cross Day I
3rd Rochester Cyclocross II

1st Northampton I & II
2nd National Championships
2nd GO Cross I & II
2023–2024
1st Pan American Championships
1st National Championships
1st Thunder Cross
1st Hampton I & II
1st Indianapolis II
2nd Indianapolis I
3rd Trek Cup
2024–2025
1st Pan American Championships
1st Mason I & II
USCX Series

1st Baltimore II
3rd Baltimore I

2026
1st Redlands Bicycle Classic - Stage one TT

=== Road ===
2019
3rd National Under-23 Criterium Championships
2022
3rd Overall Redlands Bicycle Classic
2026
1st Stage one TT Redlands Bicycle Classic -
4th Overall Redlands Bicycle Classic
1st Overall Tucson Bicycle Classic
1st Stage one Tucson Bicycle Classic
3rd Stage two Tucson Bicycle Classic
1st Stage three Tucson Bicycle Classic
