= Lance Haidet =

American cyclist (born 1997)

Personal information
- Born: December 23, 1997 (age 28) San Luis Obispo, California, United States
- Height: 1.75 m (5 ft 9 in)
- Weight: 59 kg (130 lb)

Cycling career
- Sport: Cycling
- Current team: L39ION of Los Angeles
- Disciplines: Road; Cyclo-cross
- Role: Rider

Amateur teams
- 2012–2013: Bend Memorial Clinic Total Care Racing
- 2013: PDX Devo Junior
- 2014–2016: Bear Development

Professional teams
- 2016: Team Illuminate
- 2017–2019: Aevolo
- 2020–2023: L39ION of Los Angeles

Lance Haidet (born December 23, 1997) is an American cyclist, who currently primarily competes in Gravel Cycling Racing and previously rode for UCI Continental team L39ION of Los Angeles.

== Major results ==
=== Cyclo-cross ===
2013–2014
2nd Deschutes Brewery Cup Juniors
2nd Cincy3 Lionhearts International – Cross After Dark Juniors
2014–2015
1st CXLA Weekend - Day 2 Juniors
1st Junior Derby City Cup 1
2nd Junior Derby City Cup 2
5th Pan American Junior Championships
2015–2016
2nd CXLA Weekend 1 & 2
3rd Highlander 'Cross Cup Day 2
2016–2017
1st National Under-23 Championships
3rd CXLA Weekend - Day 1 & 2
2017–2018
1st West Sacramento Cyclocross Grand Prix Day 2
2nd CXLA Weekend: Cyclocross Los Angeles Day 1 & 2
2nd West Sacramento Cyclocross Grand Prix Day 1
2018–2019
1st RenoCross
2nd Cincinnati UCI Cyclocross - Kingswood Park Day 1
2nd US Open of Cyclocross Day 1
2019–2020
1st US Open of Cyclocross Day 1
1st Ruts 'n' Guts 2
2nd Ruts 'n' Guts 1
2nd Cincinnati UCI Cyclocross - Kingswood Park Day 1
2nd FayetteCross Day 1
3rd US Open of Cyclocross Day 2
2021–2022
3rd Roanoke Day 2
3rd Falmouth Day 1
2022–2023
3rd Pan American Championships
3rd Falmouth Day 1

=== Road ===
2019
1st Road race, National Under-23 Road Championships
