= Stephen Hyde =

Australian scientist

Professor Stephen Timothy Hyde is an Australian scientist who was appointed Fellow of the Australian Academy of Science in 2005.

He is professor and also the ARC Federation Fellow in the Department of Applied Mathematics, Research School of Physics, at the Australian National University. He holds the Barry Ninham Chair of Natural Sciences.

His speciality is in the field of theoretical physics: self-assembly of complex materials and systems.

From 1999 to 2002 he was Head of the Department of Applied Mathematics. In 2021 he took up a position at the University of Sydney.
