= Michael van den Ham =

Canadian cyclo-cross cyclist

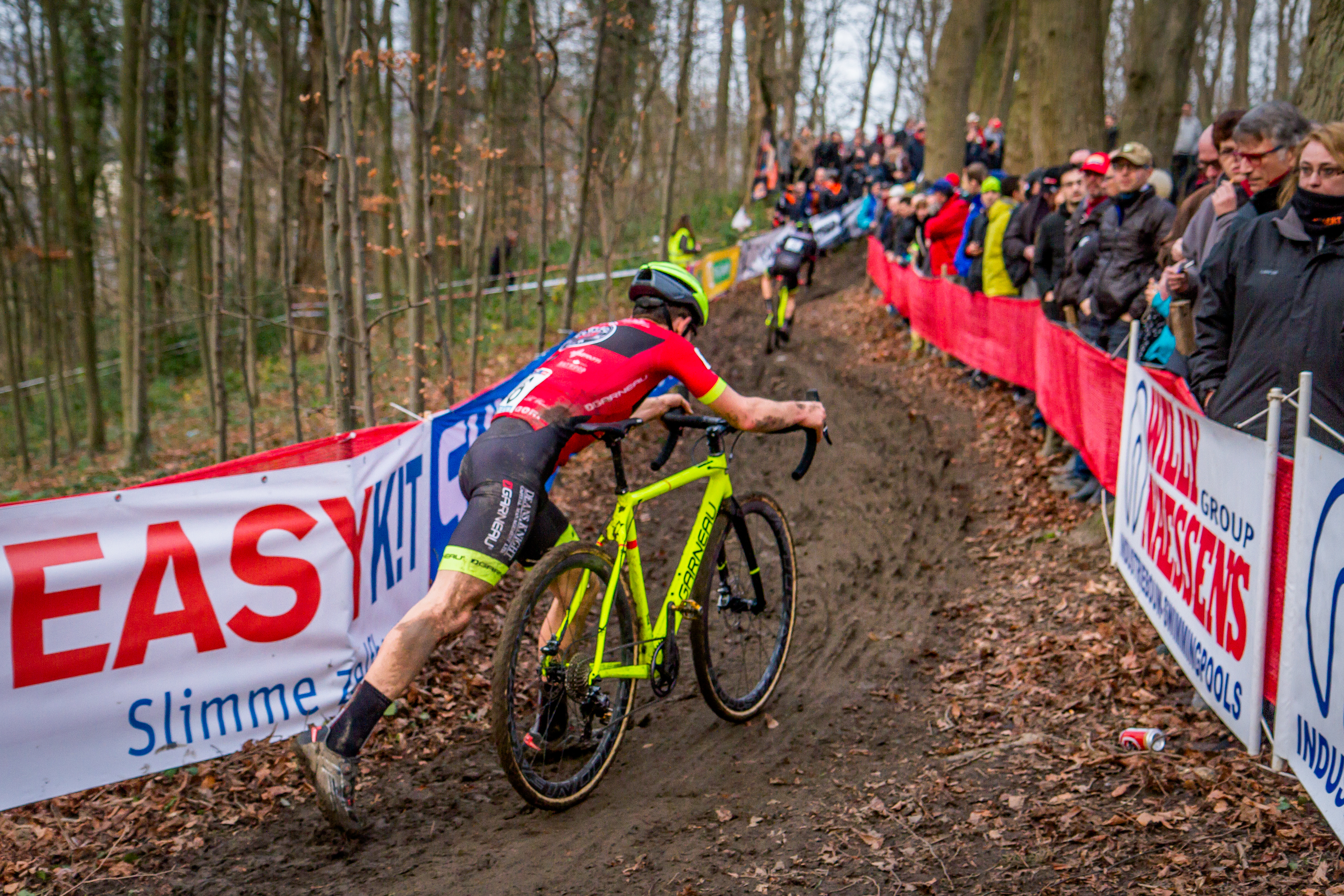

Personal information
- Born: 2 August 1992 (age 34) Brandon, Manitoba, Canada

Cycling career
- Sport: Cycling
- Discipline: Cyclo-cross
- Role: Rider

Michael Van Den Ham (born 2 August 1992) is a Canadian cyclo-cross cyclist. He competed in the men's elite event at the 2016 UCI Cyclo-cross World Championships in Heusden-Zolder.

== Major results ==
2013–2014
1st National Under-23 Championships
2014–2015
2nd Jingle Cross 3
2nd Manitoba Grand Prix of Cyclocross
3rd National Championships
2015–2016
1st The Cycle-Smart International 1
2016–2017
2nd CRAFT Sportswear Gran Prix of Gloucester
2nd Resolution 'Cross Cup 2
3rd Resolution 'Cross Cup 1
3rd Ruts n' Guts Day 1
3rd CXLA Weekend - Day 2
2017–2018
1st National Championships
1st Major Taylor 'Cross Cup Day 2
2nd US Open of Cyclocross Day 1
2nd Resolution 'Cross Cup 1
3rd Pan American Championships
3rd Resolution 'Cross Cup 2
3rd Ruts n' Guts Day 2
3rd Major Taylor 'Cross Cup Day 1
3rd US Open of Cyclocross Day 2
2018–2019
1st National Championships
2nd Pan American Championships
3rd Ruts 'n' Guts Day 2
3rd Silver Goose Cyclocross Festival
3rd TBOCX - Lift Lock Cross
2019–2020
1st National Championships
1st Resolution 'Cross Cup 1 & 2
1st Ruts 'n' Guts Day 1
1st PTBOCX
2nd Ruts 'n' Guts Day 2
2021–2022
3rd Roanoke Day 1
2023–2024
3rd Falmouth Day 1
