= EF Education–Aevolo =

American cycling team

Team information
- UCI code: AVE (2017); AEV (2018–2021); EFA (2025–)
- Registered: United States
- Founded: 2017
- Discipline: Road
- Status: UCI Continental (2017–2021, 2025–); Club (2022–2024)

Key personnel
- General manager: Michael Creed
- Team manager: Jono Coulter

Team name history
- 2017–2024 2025–: Aevolo; EF Education–Aevolo

EF Education–Aevolo is an American UCI Continental cycling team founded in 2017. Since 2025 the team serves as a development team for UCI WorldTeam EF Education–EasyPost.

== Team roster ==
As of 2 July 2025.

Rider	Date of birth
Kellen Caldwell (USA)	August 16, 2003 (age 23)
Magnus Carstensen (DEN)	January 1, 2006 (age 20)
Joshua Golliker (GBR)	March 23, 2004 (age 22)
Gavin Hlady (USA)	February 1, 2003 (age 23)
Noah Hobbs (GBR)	July 23, 2004 (age 22)

Rider	Date of birth
Linus Larsson (SWE)	July 21, 2006 (age 20)
Ian López (USA)	October 28, 2003 (age 22)
Miguel Ángel Marín (COL)	February 24, 2006 (age 20)
Noah Streif (USA)	April 7, 2006 (age 20)
Jenthe Verstraete (BEL)	February 4, 2006 (age 20)

== Major results ==
2018
Mexico National Time Trial, Luis Villalobos
United States National Under-23 Time Trial, Gage Hecht
United States National Under-23 Road Race, Alex Hoehn
Stage 1 Colorado Classic, Gage Hecht
2019
United States National Under-23 Road Race, Lance Haidet
Costa Rica National Under-23 Time Trial, Gabriel Francisco Rojas
2021
United States National Under-23 Road Race, Sean Mcelroy
Stage 2 Joe Martin Stage Race, Tyler Stites
Stage 3 (ITT) Joe Martin Stage Race, Gage Hecht
2022
Canada National Under-23 Time Trial, Tristan Jussaume
United States National Under-23 Road Race, Cooper Johnson
2024
United States National Under-23 Road Race, Gavin Hlady
2025
Overall Volta ao Alentejo, Noah Hobbs

Stages 1 & 3, Noah Hobbs

Stages 2, 6 & 7 Tour de Bretagne, Noah Hobbs
United States National Under-23 Road Race, Gavin Hlady

== National champions ==
2018
Mexican Time Trial, Luis Villalobos
United States Under-23 Time Trial, Gage Hecht
United States Under-23 Road Race, Alex Hoehn
2019
United States Under-23 Road Race, Lance Haidet
Costa Rican Under-23 Time Trial, Gabriel Francisco Rojas
2021
United States Under-23 Road Race, Sean Mcelroy
2022
Canadian Under-23 Time Trial, Tristan Jussaume
United States Under-23 Road Race, Cooper Johnson
2024
United States Under-23 Road Race, Gavin Hlady
2025
United States Under-23 Road Race, Gavin Hlady
