= Maghalie Rochette =

Canadian cyclist

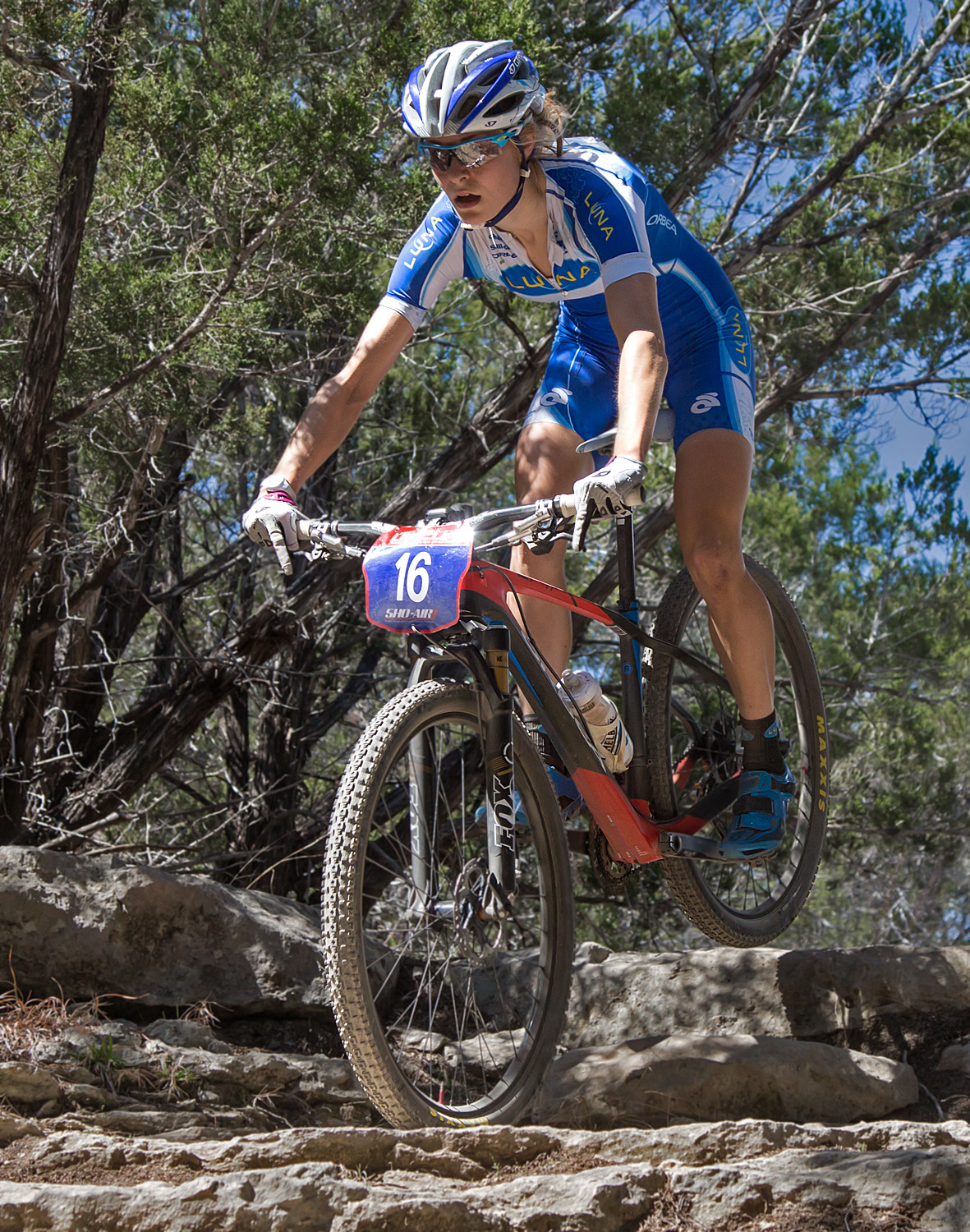

Personal information
- Born: 20 April 1993 (age 33) Sainte-Adèle, Quebec, Canada
- Height: 1.70 m (5 ft 7 in)
- Weight: 53 kg (117 lb)

Cycling career
- Sport: Cycling
- Current team: Canyon CLLCTV Gravel
- Disciplines: Cyclo-cross; Road; Gravel
- Role: Rider

Professional teams
- 2014–2018: Luna Pro Team
- 2018–2023: Specialized Feedback Sports
- 2023-: Canyon CLLCTV Gravel

Major wins
- Cyclo-cross World Cup 1 individual win (2019–20)

Maghalie Rochette (born 20 April 1993) is a Canadian cyclist, who specializes in cyclo-cross. Since 2020, Rochette has hosted the bilingual (French/English) podcast Fever Talk, featuring candid conversations highlighting the passion that drives people to succeed in sport and beyond. In 2023, Rochette collaborated with fellow professional cyclist Lucinda Brand to create the cycling-focused podcast Dirty Talks.

== Major results ==
=== Cyclo-cross ===
2013–2014
2nd Catamount Grand Prix 1 & 2
2014–2015
1st Pan American Under-23 Championships
1st National Under-23 Championships
2nd National Championships
2nd Cincy3 Harbin Park
2nd Ellison Park Festival 2
3rd Gran Prix of Gloucester 2
3rd Manitoba Grand Prix
2015–2016
1st Manitoba Grand Prix
2016–2017
1st National Championships
1st Supercross Cup Day 1 & 2
1st The Cycle-Smart Northampton International
3rd Pan American Championships
5th UCI World Championships
2017–2018
2nd National Championships
2nd Rochester Day 1 & 2
2nd KMC CrossFest Day 1 & 2
2018–2019
1st Pan American Championships
1st National Championships
1st RenoCross
1st Rochester Cyclocross Day 1 & 2
2nd Jingle Cross Day 3
2nd Charm City Cross Day 1
3rd Silver Goose Festival
2019–2020
1st Pan American Championships
1st National Championships
UCI World Cup

1st Iowa City

1st Jingle Cross Day 2
1st Resolution 'Cross Cup 1 & 2
1st Silver Goose Cyclocross Festival
1st Rochester Cyclocross Day 1 & 2
1st FayetteCross Day 1
1st Cincinnati Cyclocross - Kingswood Park Day 1 & 2
2020–2021
1st Internationals Radquer Steinmaur
EKZ CrossTour

2nd Bern

2021–2022
USCX Series

1st Rochester Day 1 & 2
1st Charm City Cross Day 2
1st Kings CX Day 1 & 2

UCI World Cup

2nd Besançon
3rd Val di Sole

2nd Gullegem
2023–2024
UCI World Cup

4th Waterloo

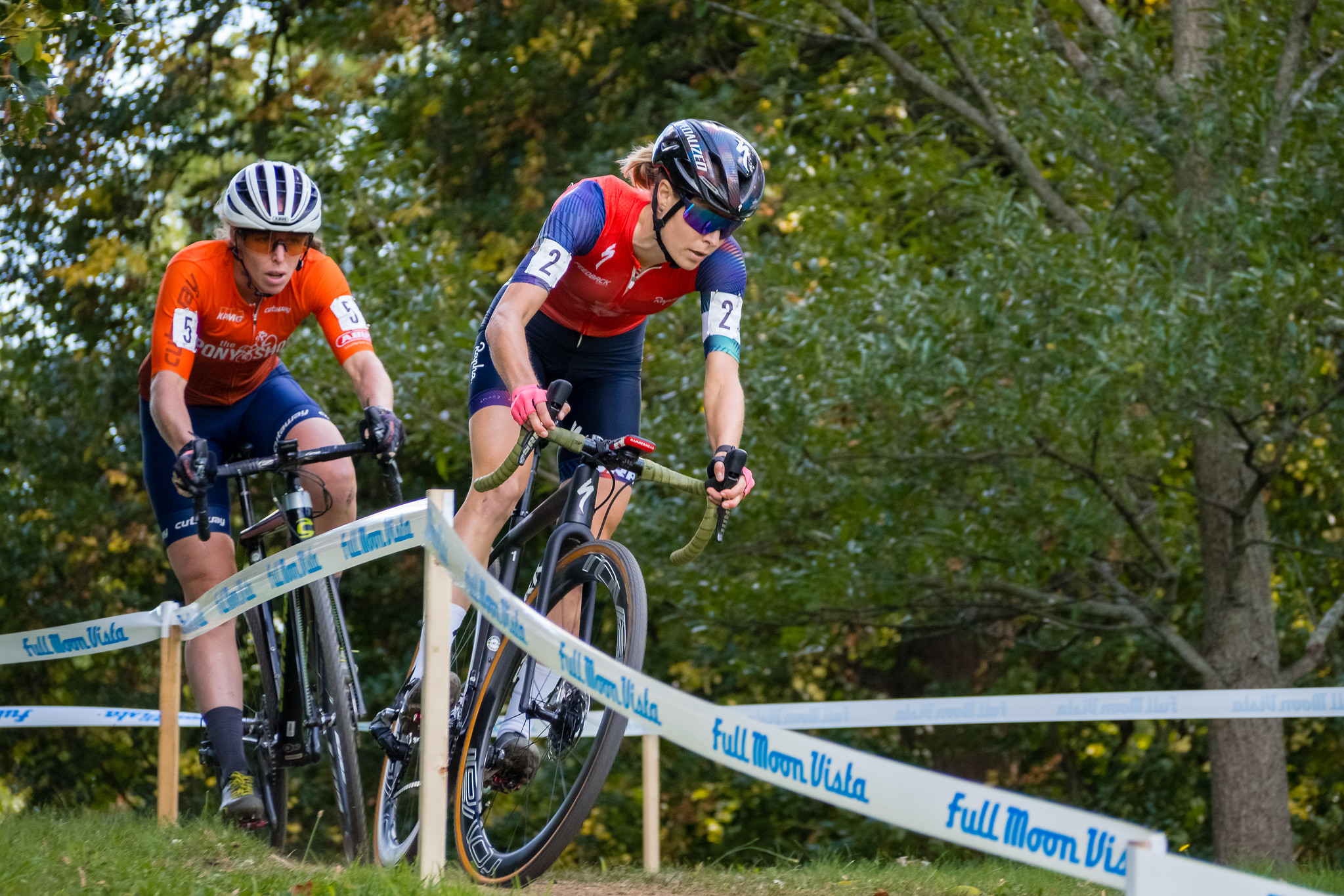
Rochette at Rochester Cyclocross

=== Road ===
2021
2nd Road race, National Championships

== Personal life ==
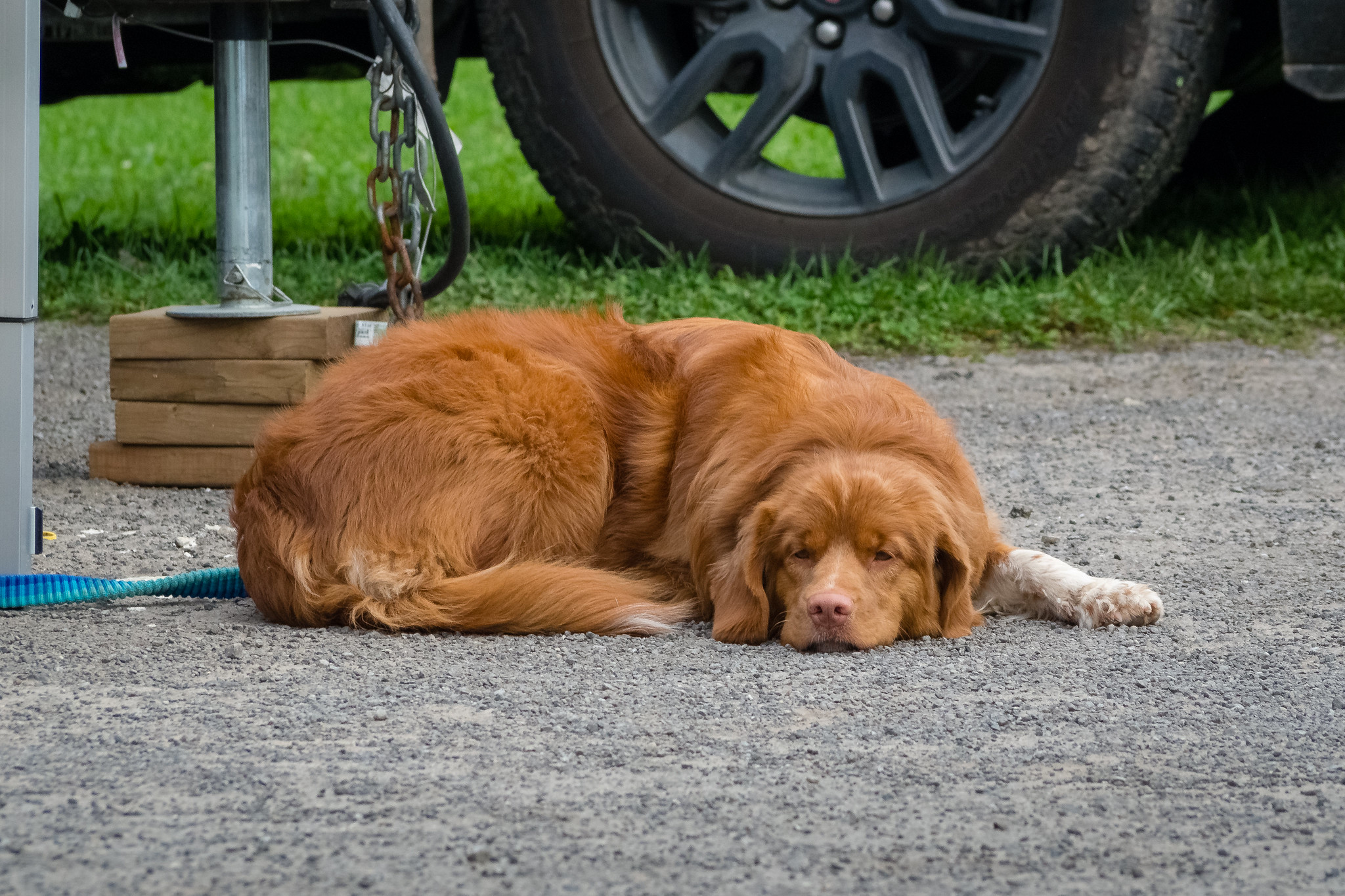
Mia relaxing at Rochester Cyclocross

Maghalie lives in Quebec with her husband and mechanic, David Gagnon, and duck tolling retriever, Mia.
