= Allison Arensman =

American cyclist

Personal information
- Born: March 19, 1994 (age 32)

Cycling career
- Sport: Cycling
- Role: Rider

Professional team
- 2015-: TWENTY16–Ridebiker

Allison Arensman (born March 19, 1994) is an American professional racing cyclist who rides for TWENTY16–Ridebiker.

Arensman is the older sister of Hannah Arensman.

== See also ==
- List of 2016 UCI Women's Teams and riders
