= Crystal Anthony =

American cyclist (born 1980)

Personal information
- Born: November 20, 1980 (age 45) Beverly, Massachusetts, U.S.

Cycling career
- Sport: Cycling
- Discipline: Cyclo-cross
- Role: Rider

Crystal Anthony (born November 20, 1980) is an American female cyclo-cross cyclist. She represented her nation in the women's elite event at the 2016 UCI Cyclo-cross World Championships in Heusden-Zolder.
