= Cyclo-cross Waterloo =

American cyclo-cross race

Location of the cyclo-cross.

The World Cup Waterloo is a cyclo-cross race held in Waterloo, Wisconsin in the United States, next to the headquarters of Trek Bicycle Corporation. It has been part of the UCI Cyclo-cross World Cup since 2017. Earlier editions were held under the name of Trek Cyclo-cross Collective Cup (in short: Trek CXC Cup).

== Past winners ==
=== Men ===
Year	Country	Rider	Team
2013	United States	Daniel Summerhill	UnitedHealthcare
2014	United States	Jeremy Powers	Aspire Racing
2015	United States	Stephen Hyde	Astellas
2016	Belgium	Wout van Aert	Crelan–Vastgoedservice
2017	Netherlands	Mathieu van der Poel	Beobank–Corendon
2018	Belgium	Toon Aerts	Telenet–Fidea Lions
2019	Belgium	Eli Iserbyt	Pauwels Sauzen–Bingoal
2021	Belgium	Eli Iserbyt	Pauwels Sauzen–Bingoal
2022	Belgium	Eli Iserbyt	Pauwels Sauzen–Bingoal
2023	Belgium	Thibau Nys	Baloise–Trek Lions

=== Women ===
Year	Country	Rider	Team
2013	United States	Elle Anderson	
2014	United States	Katie Compton	
2015	United States	Crystal Anthony	
2016	United States	Kaitlin Antonneau	Cannondale–Cyclocrossworld.com
2017	Belgium	Sanne Cant	IKO-Beobank
2018	Netherlands	Marianne Vos	WaowDeals Pro Cycling
2019	Czech Republic	Kateřina Nash	
2021	Netherlands	Marianne Vos	Team Jumbo–Visma
2022	Netherlands	Fem Van Empel	Pauwels Sauzen–Bingoal
2023	Netherlands	Fem Van Empel	Team Jumbo–Visma
