= 2025–26 UCI Cyclo-cross season =

Bicycle racing competition

Details
- Dates: August 2025 – February 2026
- Location: World (North America, Europe, Asia, Australia and New Zealand)

The calendar for the 2025–2026 men's and women's cyclo-cross season includes cyclo-cross races starting in August 2025, and ending in February 2026. The individual events are classified into five categories. The highest category includes the world cup events (CDM), which gives rise to a ranking. Behind them, we find the C1 and C2 category races, which award points are for the world ranking, then the races reserved for those under 23, also called hopes (category CU) and finally the races for juniors (category CJ) . There are also national championships (NC) which are organized in about thirty countries.

== Men's Elite ==
=== Events ===
==== August ====
Date	Course	Class	Winner	Team	References
17 August 2025	(Australia) Ballarat XC, Ballarat	C2	Tasman Nankervis (AUS)		

==== September ====
Date	Course	Class	Winner	Team	References
6 September 2025	(United States) Thunder Cross Day 1, Huson	C2	Luke Walter (USA)	Pure Energy Drink - Haro Bikes By Corego	
7 September 2025	(United States) Thunder Cross Day 2, Huson	C2	Caleb Swartz (USA)		
13 September 2025	(United Kingdom) Hope Supercross Series #1, Wyke	C2	Kenay De Moyer (BEL)	Pauwels Sauzen–Altez Industriebouw Cycling Team	
14 September 2025	(United Kingdom) Hope Supercross Series #2, Wyke	C2	Kenay De Moyer (BEL)	Pauwels Sauzen–Altez Industriebouw Cycling Team	
17 September 2025	(United Kingdom) Hope Supercross Series #3, Bradford	C2	Thomas Mein (GBR)	Hope Factory Racing	
20 September 2025	(United Kingdom) Hope Supercross Series #4, Bradford	C2	Thomas Mein (GBR)	Hope Factory Racing	
27 September 2025	(Luxembourg) Cyclocross UC Dippach 2025, Schouweiler	C2	Niels Vandeputte (BEL)	Alpecin–Deceuninck	
28 September 2025	(Switzerland) Radcross Illnau, Illnau-Effretikon	C2	Kevin Kuhn (SUI)	Heizomat - Cube	

==== October ====
Date	Course	Class	Winner	Team	References
5 October 2025	(France) Brumath Bike Festival, Brumath	C1	Yordi Corsus (BEL)	Pauwels Sauzen–Altez Industriebouw Cycling Team	
11 October 2025	(United States) Englewood Open CX Day 1, Fall River	C2	Nathan Knowles (USA)		
12 October 2025	(Czech Republic) Grand Prix Pilsen 2025, Plzeň	C2	Victor Van de Putte (BEL)	Deschacht - Hens CX Team	
12 October 2025	(Italy) CX Rivellino Osoppo, Osoppo	C2	Samuele Scappini (ITA)	Team Cingolani Specialized	
12 October 2025	(United States) Englewood Open CX Day 2, Fall River	C2	Calvin Conaway (USA)		
16 October 2025	(Belgium) Kermiscross, Ardooie	C2	Toon Aerts (BEL)	Deschacht - Hens CX Team	
18 October 2025	(United States) Kings CX Day 1, Mason	C1	Jules van Kempen (USA)		
19 October 2025	(United States) Kings CX Day 2, Mason	C2	Jules van Kempen (USA)		
25 October 2025	(Denmark) Cross4Life Challenge Copenhagen, Copenhagen	C2	Cancelled		
25 October 2025	(Italy) Due Giorni Lombarda CX di Salvirola I, Salvirola	C2	Filippo Fontana (ITA)		
25 October 2025	(Spain) G.P Kh7 - Dark Cross Les Franqueses, Les Franqueses del Vallès	C2	Javier Zaera Gisbert (ESP)		
25 October 2025	(United States) Major Taylor Cross Cup Day 1, Indianapolis	C2	Brody McDonald (USA)		
25 October 2025	(United States) Really Rad Festival of Cyclocross Day 1, Falmouth	C1	Andrew Strohmeyer (USA)	CXD Trek Bikes	
26 October 2025	(Denmark) Cross4Life Copenhagen, Copenhagen	C2	Cancelled		
26 October 2025	(Italy) Due Giorni Lombarda CX di Salvirola II, Salvirola	C2	Mattia Agostinacchio (ITA)	EF Education–EasyPost	
26 October 2025	(United States) Major Taylor Cross Cup Day 2, Indianapolis	C2	Tofik Beshir (ETH)		
26 October 2025	(United States) Really Rad Festival of Cyclocross Day 2, Falmouth	C2	Andrew Strohmeyer (USA)	CXD Trek Bikes	

==== November ====
Date	Course	Class	Winner	Team	References
1 November 2025	(United States) Cycle-Smart Northampton Cyclocross Day 1, Northampton	C2	Dylan Zakrajsek (USA)	Competitive Edge Racing	
2 November 2025	(France) Cyclo-cross des Remparts de Langres, Langres	C2	Théo Thomas (FRA)	Sebmotobikes CX Team	
2 November 2025	(United States) Cycle-Smart Northampton Cyclocross Day 2, Northampton	C2	Henry Coote (USA)		
9 November 2025	(Spain) Ormaiztegiko ZikloKrossa, Ormaiztegi	C2	Clément Horny (BEL)		
9 November 2025	(United States) DCCX, Washington	C2	Brody Mcdonald (USA)		
15 November 2025	(Poland) Owocowy Przelaj - Laskowice Pomorskie, Laskowice	C2	Jakub Říman (CZE)		
15 November 2025	(United States) Boulder Cup Day 1, Boulder	C1	Eric Brunner (USA)	Competitive Edge Racing	
16 November 2025	(Canada) Cyclocross de Lévis, Lévis	C1	Tyler Clark (CAN)		
16 November 2025	(Poland) Dalej Na Pólnoc Się Nie Da Wladyslawowo-Cetniewo, Władysławowo	C2	Ksawier Garnek (POL)		
16 November 2025	(United States) Boulder Cup Day 2, Boulder	C2	Eric Brunner (USA)	Competitive Edge Racing	
22 November 2025	(France) Cyclo-cross Gernelle, Gernelle	C2	Lander Loockx (BEL)	Unibet Tietema Rockets	
22 November 2025	(Spain) Ciclocross de Gurb Memorial Lluis Vila i Codina, Gurb	C2	Gonzalo Inguanzo (ESP)	Supermercados Froiz	
22 November 2025	(United States) North Carolina Grand Prix Day 1, Hendersonville	C2	Kerry Werner (USA)		
23 November 2025	(Italy) Turin International Cyclocross, Turin	C2	Gioele Bertolini (ITA)	Ale Colnago Team	
23 November 2025	(United States) North Carolina Grand Prix Day 2, Hendersonville	C2	Cole Punchard (CAN)		
30 November 2025	(Greece) Hellenic Cyclo-Cross Prestige Race Larissa, Larissa	C2	Louis Losfeld (BEL)		

==== December ====
Date	Course	Class	Winner	Team	References
7 December 2025	(Poland) Lubuskie Warte Zachodu - Zielona Góra, Zielona Góra	C2	Marek Konwa (POL)		
8 December 2025	(Spain) Ciclocross Internacional Ciudad de Tarazona, Tarazona	C2	Cancelled		
13 December 2025	(Poland) O puchar Marszalka Województwa Mazowieckiego - Plonsk, Płońsk	C2	Cancelled		
14 December 2025	(Italy) Ciclocross Del Ponte, Oderzo	C2	Filippo Fontana (ITA)		
14 December 2025	(Poland) O puchar Marszalka Województwa Mazowieckiego - Nowy Dwór Mazowiecki, Nowy Dwór Mazowiecki	C2	Cancelled		
14 December 2025	(Spain) Ciclocross Internacional Ciudad de Valencia, Valencia	C2	Cancelled		
20 December 2025	(France) Cyclo-cross International de Béthune, Béthune	C2	Lander Loockx (BEL)	Unibet Tietema Rockets	

==== January ====
Date	Course	Class	Winner	Team	References
1 January 2026	(Luxembourg) Grand Prix Garage Collé, Pétange	C2	Gerben Kuypers (BEL)	Pauwels Sauzen–Altez Industriebouw Cycling Team	
12 January 2026	(Belgium) Nationale Cyclo-Cross Otegem, Otegem	C2	Toon Aerts (BEL)	Charles Liégeois - Deschacht	
17 January 2026	(United Kingdom) MKCX Milton Keynes, Milton Keynes	C2	Cancelled		

==== February ====
Date	Course	Class	Winner	Team	References
22 February 2026	(Belgium) Sluitingsprijs Oostmalle, Oostmalle	C1	Niels Vandeputte (BEL)	Alpecin–Premier Tech	

== 2025-2026 UCI Cyclo-cross World Cup ==
Date	Course	Class	Winner	Team	References
23 November 2025	(Czech Republic) Cyclo-cross World Cup #1, Tábor	CDM	Thibau Nys (BEL)	Baloise Verzekeringen–Het Poetsbureau Lions	
30 November 2025	(France) Cyclo-cross World Cup #2, Flamanville	CDM	Thibau Nys (BEL)	Baloise Verzekeringen–Het Poetsbureau Lions	
7 December 2025	(Italy) Cyclo-cross World Cup #3, Terralba	CDM	Michael Vanthourenhout (BEL)	Pauwels Sauzen–Altez Industriebouw Cycling Team	
14 December 2025	(Belgium) Cyclo-cross World Cup #4, Namur	CDM	Mathieu van der Poel (NED)	Alpecin–Deceuninck	
20 December 2025	(Belgium) Cyclo-cross World Cup #5, Antwerp	CDM	Mathieu van der Poel (NED)	Alpecin–Deceuninck	
21 December 2025	(Belgium) Cyclo-cross World Cup #6, Koksijde	CDM	Mathieu van der Poel (NED)	Alpecin–Deceuninck	
26 December 2025	(Belgium) Cyclo-cross World Cup #7, Gavere	CDM	Mathieu van der Poel (NED)	Alpecin–Deceuninck	
28 December 2025	(Belgium) Cyclo-cross World Cup #8, Dendermonde	CDM	Thibau Nys (BEL)	Baloise Verzekeringen–Het Poetsbureau Lions	
4 January 2026	(Belgium) Cyclo-cross World Cup #9, Zonhoven	CDM	Mathieu van der Poel (NED)	Alpecin–Premier Tech	
18 January 2026	(Spain) Cyclo-cross World Cup #10, Benidorm	CDM	Mathieu van der Poel (NED)	Alpecin–Premier Tech	
24 January 2026	(Belgium) Cyclo-cross World Cup #11, Maasmechelen	CDM	Mathieu van der Poel (NED)	Alpecin–Premier Tech	
25 January 2026	(Netherlands) Cyclo-cross World Cup #12, Hoogerheide	CDM	Mathieu van der Poel (NED)	Alpecin–Premier Tech	
—	Overall winner	Mathieu van der Poel (NED)		Alpecin–Premier Tech	

== 2025–26 Cyclo-cross Superprestige ==
Date	Course	Class	Winner	Team	References
19 October 2025	(Belgium) Superprestige Series #1, Cyclo-cross Ruddervoorde, Ruddervoorde	C1	Michael Vanthourenhout (BEL)	Pauwels Sauzen–Altez Industriebouw Cycling Team	
26 October 2025	(Belgium) Superprestige Series #2, Druivencross, Overijse	C1	Michael Vanthourenhout (BEL)	Pauwels Sauzen–Altez Industriebouw Cycling Team	
11 November 2025	(Belgium) Superprestige Series #3, Jaarmarktcross Niel, Niel	C1	Laurens Sweeck (BEL)	Crelan - Corendon	
15 November 2025	(Belgium) Superprestige Series #4, Merksplas	C1	Joris Nieuwenhuis (NED)	Ridley Racing Team	
23 December 2025	(Belgium) Superprestige Series #5, Heusden-Zolder	C1	Tibor Del Grosso (NED)	Alpecin–Deceuninck	
30 December 2025	(Belgium) Superprestige Series #6, Diegem	C1	Tibor Del Grosso (NED)	Alpecin–Deceuninck	
3 January 2026	(Belgium) Superprestige Series #7, Gullegem	C2	Niels Vandeputte (BEL)	Alpecin–Premier Tech	
7 February 2026	(Belgium) Superprestige Series #8, Noordzeecross, Middelkerke	C1	Michael Vanthourenhout (BEL)	Pauwels Sauzen–Altez Industriebouw Cycling Team	
—	Overall winner	Niels Vandeputte (BEL)		Alpecin–Premier Tech	

== 2025–26 Cyclo-cross Trophy ==
Date	Course	Class	Winner	Team	References
1 November 2025	(Belgium) X2O Trofee #1, Koppenbergcross, Oudenaarde	C1	Thibau Nys (BEL)	Baloise Verzekeringen–Het Poetsbureau Lions	
2 November 2025	(Belgium) X2O Trofee #2, Rapencross, Lokeren	C2	Joris Nieuwenhuis (NED)	Ridley Racing Team	
16 November 2025	(Belgium) X2O Trofee #3, Flandriencross, Hamme	C2	Thibau Nys (BEL)	Baloise Verzekeringen–Het Poetsbureau Lions	
22 December 2025	(Belgium) X2O Trofee #4, Plage Cross, Hofstade	C2	Mathieu van der Poel (NED)	Alpecin–Deceuninck	
29 December 2025	(Belgium) X2O Trofee #5, Azencross, Loenhout	C1	Mathieu van der Poel (NED)	Alpecin–Deceuninck	
1 January 2026	(Belgium) X2O Trofee #6, Grand Prix Sven Nys, Baal	C1	Mathieu van der Poel (NED)	Alpecin–Premier Tech	
8 February 2026	(Belgium) X2O Trofee #7, Krawatencross, Lille	C1	Niels Vandeputte (BEL)	Alpecin–Premier Tech	
15 February 2026	(Belgium) X2O Trofee #8, Brussels Universities Cyclocross, Brussels	C1	Michael Vanthourenhout (BEL)	Pauwels Sauzen–Altez Industriebouw Cycling Team	
—	Overall winner	Joris Nieuwenhuis (NED)		Ridley Racing Team	

== 2025-2026 Exact Cross ==
Date	Course	Class	Winner	Team	References
4 October 2025	(Belgium) Exact Cross Series #1, Meulebeke	C2	Joran Wyseure (BEL)	Crelan - Corendon	
18 October 2025	(Belgium) Exact Cross Series #2, Essen	C2	Toon Vandebosch (BEL)	Crelan - Corendon	
13 December 2025	(Belgium) Exact Cross Series #3, Kortrijk	C2	Niels Vandeputte (BEL)	Alpecin–Deceuninck	
2 January 2026	(Belgium) Exact Cross Series #4, Zilvermeercross, Mol	C2	Mathieu van der Poel (NED)	Alpecin–Premier Tech	
4 February 2026	(Belgium) Exact Cross Series #5, Parkcross, Maldegem	C2	Niels Vandeputte (BEL)	Alpecin–Premier Tech	
14 February 2026	(Belgium) Exact Cross Series #6, Waaslandcross, Sint-Niklaas	C2	Niels Vandeputte (BEL)	Alpecin–Premier Tech	

== Women's Elite ==
=== Events ===
==== August ====
Date	Course	Class	Winner	Team	References
17 August 2025	(Australia) Ballarat XC, Ballarat	C2	Peta Mullens (AUS)		

==== September ====
Date	Course	Class	Winner	Team	References
6 September 2025	(United States) Thunder Cross Day 1, Huson	C2	Sidney McGill (CAN)		
6 September 2025	(United States) Thunder Cross Day 2, Huson	C2	Sidney McGill (CAN)		
13 September 2025	(United Kingdom) Hope Supercross Series #1, Wyke	C1	Laura Verdonschot (BEL)	De Ceuster-Bouwpunt	
14 September 2025	(United Kingdom) Hope Supercross Series #2, Wyke	C1	Laura Verdonschot (BEL)	De Ceuster-Bouwpunt	
17 September 2025	(United Kingdom) Hope Supercross Series #3, Bradford	C2	Laura Verdonschot (BEL)	De Ceuster-Bouwpunt	
20 September 2025	(United Kingdom) Hope Supercross Series #4, Bradford	C2	Laura Verdonschot (BEL)	De Ceuster-Bouwpunt	
27 September 2025	(Luxembourg) Cyclocross UC Dippach 2025, Schouweiler	C2	Julie Brouwers (BEL)	Charles Liégeois Roastery CX	
28 September 2025	(Switzerland) Radcross Illnau, Illnau-Effretikon	C2	Alicia Franck (BEL)		

==== October ====
Date	Course	Class	Winner	Team	References
5 October 2025	(France) Brumath Bike Festival, Brumath	C1	Leonie Bentveld (NED)	Pauwels Sauzen–Altez Industriebouw Cycling Team	
11 October 2025	(United States) Englewood Open CX Day 1, Fall River	C2	Manon Bakker (NED)	Crelan - Corendon	
12 October 2025	(Czech Republic) Grand Prix Pilsen 2025, Plzeň	C2	Kristýna Zemanová (CZE)		
12 October 2025	(Italy) CX Rivellino Osoppo, Osoppo	C2	Sara Casasola (ITA)	Crelan - Corendon	
12 October 2025	(United States) Englewood Open CX Day 2, Fall River	C2	Manon Bakker (NED)	Crelan - Corendon	
16 October 2025	(Belgium) Kermiscross, Ardooie	C2	Lucinda Brand (NED)	Baloise Verzekeringen–Het Poetsbureau Lions	
18 October 2025	(United States) Kings CX Day 1, Mason	C1	Lizzy Gunsalus (USA)		
19 October 2025	(United States) Kings CX Day 2, Mason	C2	Lizzy Gunsalus (USA)		
25 October 2025	(Denmark) Cross4Life Challenge Copenhagen, Copenhagen	C2	Cancelled		
25 October 2025	(Italy) Due Giorni Lombarda CX di Salvirola I, Salvirola	C2	Lucia Bramati (ITA)	FAS Airport Services - Guerciotti	
25 October 2025	(Spain) G.P Kh7 - Dark Cross Les Franqueses, Les Franqueses del Vallès	C2	Laia Bosch (ESP)		
25 October 2025	(United States) Really Rad Festival of Cyclocross Day 1, Falmouth	C1	Maghalie Rochette (CAN)		
25 October 2025	(United States) Major Taylor Cross Cup Day 1, Indianapolis	C2	Lizzy Gunsalus (USA)		
26 October 2025	(Denmark) Cross4Life Copenhagen, Copenhagen	C2	Cancelled		
26 October 2025	(Italy) Due Giorni Lombarda CX di Salvirola II, Salvirola	C2	Carlotta Borello (ITA)		
26 October 2025	(United States) Really Rad Festival of Cyclocross Day 2, Falmouth	C2	Rafaëlle Carrier (CAN)		
26 October 2025	(United States) Major Taylor Cross Cup Day 2, Indianapolis	C2	Lizzy Gunsalus (USA)		

==== November ====
Date	Course	Class	Winner	Team	References
1 November 2025	(United States) Cycle-Smart Northampton Cyclocross Day 1, Northampton	C2	Sidney McGill (CAN)		
2 November 2025	(France) Cyclo-cross des Remparts de Langres, Langres	C2	Line Burquier (FRA)		
2 November 2025	(United States) Cycle-Smart Northampton Cyclocross Day 2, Northampton	C2	Lizzy Gunsalus (USA)		
9 November 2025	(Spain) Ormaiztegiko ZikloKrossa, Ormaiztegi	C2	Anaïs Morichon (FRA)	Team Guevel Roadborn	
9 November 2025	(United States) DCCX, Washington	C2	Lidia Cusack (USA)	CXD Trek Bikes	
15 November 2025	(Poland) Owocowy Przelaj - Laskowice Pomorskie, Laskowice	C2	Zuzanna Krzystała (POL)	Pho3nix Cycling Team	
15 November 2025	(United States) Boulder Cup Day 1, Boulder	C1	Caroline Mani (FRA)	Velomafia p/b Bikeflights	
16 November 2025	(Canada) Cyclocross de Lévis, Lévis	C1	Rafaëlle Carrier (CAN)		
16 November 2025	(Poland) Dalej Na Pólnoc Się Nie Da Wladyslawowo-Cetniewo, Władysławowo	C2	Zuzanna Krzystała (POL)	Pho3nix Cycling Team	
16 November 2025	(United States) Boulder Cup Day 2, Boulder	C2	Makena Kellerman (USA)		
22 November 2025	(France) Cyclo-cross Gernelle, Gernelle	C2	Anaïs Morichon (FRA)	Team Guevel Roadborn	
22 November 2025	(Spain) Ciclocross de Gurb Memorial Lluis Vila i Codina, Gurb	C2	Larissa Hartog (NED)	Orange Babies Cycling Team	
22 November 2025	(United States) North Carolina Grand Prix Day 1, Hendersonville	C2	Jolanda Neff (SUI)		
23 November 2025	(Italy) Turin International Cyclocross, Turin	C2	Carlotta Borello (ITA)		
23 November 2025	(United States) North Carolina Grand Prix Day 2, Hendersonville	C2	Jolanda Neff (SUI)		
30 November 2025	(Greece) Hellenic Cyclo-Cross Prestige Race Larissa, Larissa	C2	Adèle Hurteloup (FRA)	Velopro - EGS Group - Alphamotorhomes	

==== December ====
Date	Course	Class	Winner	Team	References
7 December 2025	(Poland) Lubuskie Warte Zachodu - Zielona Góra, Zielona Góra	C2	Judith Krahl (GER)		
8 December 2025	(Spain) Ciclocross Internacional Ciudad de Tarazona, Tarazona	C2	Cancelled		
13 December 2025	(Poland) O puchar Marszalka Województwa Mazowieckiego - Plonsk, Płońsk	C2	Cancelled		
14 December 2025	(Italy) Ciclocross Del Ponte, Oderzo	C2	Elisa Ferri (ITA)	FAS Airport Services - Guerciotti	
14 December 2025	(Poland) O puchar Marszalka Województwa Mazowieckiego - Nowy Dwór Mazowiecki, Nowy Dwór Mazowiecki	C2	Cancelled		
14 December 2025	(Spain) Ciclocross Internacional Ciudad de Valencia, Valencia	C2	Cancelled		
20 December 2025	(France) Cyclo-cross International de Béthune, Béthune	C2	Noémie Garnier (FRA)	Creuse Oxygène Guéret	

==== January ====
Date	Course	Class	Winner	Team	References
1 January 2026	(Luxembourg) Grand Prix Garage Collé, Pétange	C2	Liv Wenzel (LUX)	Sebmotobikes CX Team	
12 January 2026	(Belgium) Nationale Cyclo-Cross Otegem, Otegem	C2	Marion Norbert-Riberolle (BEL)	Crelan - Corendon	
17 January 2026	(United Kingdom) MKCX Milton Keynes, Milton Keynes	C2	Cancelled		

==== February ====
Date	Course	Class	Winner	Team	References
22 February 2026	(Belgium) Sluitingsprijs Oostmalle, Oostmalle	C1	Inge van der Heijden (NED)	Crelan-Corendon	

== 2025-2026 UCI Cyclo-cross World Cup ==
Date	Course	Class	Winner	Team	References
23 November 2025	(Czech Republic) Cyclo-cross World Cup #1, Tábor	CDM	Lucinda Brand (NED)	Baloise Verzekeringen–Het Poetsbureau Lions	
30 November 2025	(France) Cyclo-cross World Cup #2, Flamanville	CDM	Aniek van Alphen (NED)	777	
7 December 2025	(Italy) Cyclo-cross World Cup #3, Terralba	CDM	Lucinda Brand (NED)	Baloise Verzekeringen–Het Poetsbureau Lions	
14 December 2025	(Belgium) Cyclo-cross World Cup #4, Namur	CDM	Lucinda Brand (NED)	Baloise Verzekeringen–Het Poetsbureau Lions	
20 December 2025	(Belgium) Cyclo-cross World Cup #5, Antwerp	CDM	Lucinda Brand (NED)	Baloise Verzekeringen–Het Poetsbureau Lions	
21 December 2025	(Belgium) Cyclo-cross World Cup #6, Koksijde	CDM	Lucinda Brand (NED)	Baloise Verzekeringen–Het Poetsbureau Lions	
26 December 2025	(Belgium) Cyclo-cross World Cup #7, Gavere	CDM	Lucinda Brand (NED)	Baloise Verzekeringen–Het Poetsbureau Lions	
28 December 2025	(Belgium) Cyclo-cross World Cup #8, Dendermonde	CDM	Lucinda Brand (NED)	Baloise Verzekeringen–Het Poetsbureau Lions	
4 January 2026	(Belgium) Cyclo-cross World Cup #9, Zonhoven	CDM	Ceylin del Carmen Alvarado (NED)	Alpecin–Premier Tech	
18 January 2026	(Spain) Cyclo-cross World Cup #10, Benidorm	CDM	Lucinda Brand (NED)	Baloise Verzekeringen–Het Poetsbureau Lions	
24 January 2026	(Belgium) Cyclo-cross World Cup #11, Maasmechelen	CDM	Puck Pieterse (NED)	Fenix–Premier Tech	
25 January 2026	(Netherlands) Cyclo-cross World Cup #12, Hoogerheide	CDM	Puck Pieterse (NED)	Alpecin–Premier Tech	
—	Overall winner	Lucinda Brand (NED)		Baloise Verzekeringen–Het Poetsbureau Lions	

== 2025–26 Cyclo-cross Superprestige ==
Date	Course	Class	Winner	Team	References
19 October 2025	(Belgium) Superprestige Series #1, Cyclo-cross Ruddervoorde, Ruddervoorde	C1	Marion Norbert-Riberolle (BEL)	Crelan - Corendon	
26 October 2025	(Belgium) Superprestige Series #2, Druivencross, Overijse	C1	Sara Casasola (ITA)	Crelan - Corendon	
11 November 2025	(Belgium) Superprestige Series #3, Jaarmarktcross Niel, Niel	C1	Lucinda Brand (NED)	Baloise Verzekeringen–Het Poetsbureau Lions	
15 November 2025	(Belgium) Superprestige Series #4, Merksplas	C1	Lucinda Brand (NED)	Baloise Verzekeringen–Het Poetsbureau Lions	
23 December 2025	(Belgium) Superprestige Series #5, Heusden-Zolder	C1	Amandine Fouquenet (FRA)	Arkéa–B&B Hotels Women	
30 December 2025	(Belgium) Superprestige Series #6, Diegem	C1	Puck Pieterse (NED)	Fenix–Deceuninck	
3 January 2026	(Belgium) Superprestige Series #7, Gullegem	C2	Amandine Fouquenet (FRA)	Arkéa–B&B Hotels Women	
7 February 2026	(Belgium) Superprestige Series #8, Noordzeecross, Middelkerke	C1	Amandine Fouquenet (FRA)	Arkéa–B&B Hotels Women	
—	Overall winner	Aniek van Alphen (NED); Amandine Fouquenet (FRA)		777; Baloise Verzekeringen–Het Poetsbureau Lions	

== 2025–26 Cyclo-cross Trophy ==
Date	Course	Class	Winner	Team	References
1 November 2025	(Belgium) X2O Trofee #1, Koppenbergcross, Oudenaarde	C1	Lucinda Brand (NED)	Baloise Verzekeringen–Het Poetsbureau Lions	
2 November 2025	(Belgium) X2O Trofee #2, Rapencross, Lokeren	C2	Lucinda Brand (NED)	Baloise Verzekeringen–Het Poetsbureau Lions	
16 November 2025	(Belgium) X2O Trofee #3, Flandriencross, Hamme	C2	Lucinda Brand (NED)	Baloise Verzekeringen–Het Poetsbureau Lions	
22 December 2025	(Belgium) X2O Trofee #4, Plage Cross, Hofstade	C2	Lucinda Brand (NED)	Baloise Verzekeringen–Het Poetsbureau Lions	
29 December 2025	(Belgium) X2O Trofee #5, Azencross, Loenhout	C1	Lucinda Brand (NED)	Baloise Verzekeringen–Het Poetsbureau Lions	
1 January 2026	(Belgium) X2O Trofee #6, Grand Prix Sven Nys, Baal	C1	Lucinda Brand (NED)	Baloise Verzekeringen–Het Poetsbureau Lions	
8 February 2026	(Belgium) X2O Trofee #7, Krawatencross, Lille	C1	Ceylin del Carmen Alvarado (NED)	Fenix–Premier Tech	
15 February 2026	(Belgium) X2O Trofee #8, Brussels Universities Cyclocross, Brussels	C1	Ceylin del Carmen Alvarado (NED)	Fenix–Premier Tech	
—	Overall winner	Lucinda Brand (NED)		Baloise Verzekeringen–Het Poetsbureau Lions	

== 2025-2026 Exact Cross ==
Date	Course	Class	Winner	Team	References
4 October 2025	(Belgium) Exact Cross Series #1, Meulebeke	C2	Inge van der Heijden (NED)	Crelan - Corendon	
18 October 2025	(Belgium) Exact Cross Series #2, Essen	C2	Lucinda Brand (NED)	Baloise Verzekeringen–Het Poetsbureau Lions	
13 December 2025	(Belgium) Exact Cross Series #3, Kortrijk	C2	Inge van der Heijden (NED)	Crelan - Corendon	
2 January 2026	(Belgium) Exact Cross Series #4, Zilvermeercross, Mol	C2	Ceylin del Carmen Alvarado (NED)	Fenix–Premier Tech	
4 February 2026	(Belgium) Exact Cross Series #5, Parkcross, Maldegem	C2	Marie Schreiber (LUX)	Team SD Worx–Protime	
14 February 2026	(Belgium) Exact Cross Series #6, Waaslandcross, Sint-Niklaas	C2	Lucinda Brand (NED)	Baloise Verzekeringen–Het Poetsbureau Lions	

== National Cups Men's Elite ==
=== 2025 AusCycling National Cyclo-Cross Series ===
Date	Course	Class	Winner	Team	References
31 May 2025	(Australia) 2025 AusCycling CX National Series Round 1, Geelong	NE	Harrison Bebbington (AUS)		
1 June 2025	(Australia) 2025 AusCycling CX National Series Round 2, Geelong	NE	Cameron Ivory (AUS)		
21 June 2025	(Australia) 2025 AusCycling CX National Series Round 3, Sydney	NE	Cameron Ivory (AUS)		
22 June 2025	(Australia) 2024 AusCycling CX National Series Round 4, Sydney	NE	Cameron Ivory (AUS)		
26 July 2025	(Australia) 2025 AusCycling CX National Series Round 5, Adelaide	NE	Tristan Nash (AUS)	Midland CC	
27 July 2025	(Australia) 2025 AusCycling CX National Series Round 6, Adelaide	NE	Tristan Nash (AUS)	Midland CC	
17 August 2025	(Australia) 2025 AusCycling CX National Series Round 7, Ballarat	NE	Campbell McConnell (AUS)		

=== 2025–26 Cycling Austria Cup ===
Date	Course	Class	Winner	Team	References
4 October 2025	2025–26 Cycling Austria Cup #1 – Quer durchs Stadion, Pernitz	NE	Manfred Zöger (AUT)	MTB-Team Bucklige	
12 October 2025	2025–26 Cycling Austria Cup #2 – King & Queen of Seeschlacht powered by Bikestore.cc, Langenzersdorf	NE	Hannes Hnilica (AUT)	SU Bikestore.cc Team	
9 November 2025	2025–26 Cycling Austria Cup #3 – GP Ternitz um die Preise des ARBÖ, Ternitz	NE	Jakob Reiter (AUT)	Hrinkow Bikes Steyr	
23 November 2025	2025–26 Cycling Austria Cup #4 – Wienenergie Cyclocross Landegg, Landegg	NE	Simon Petridis (AUT)	SU Bikestore.cc Team	
7 December 2025	2025–26 Cycling Austria Cup #5 – 10. Bad Ischler CX, Bad Ischl	NE	Jakob Reiter (AUT)	Hrinkow Bikes Steyr	
8 December 2025	2025–26 Cycling Austria Cup #6 – Int. Sparkassen Querfeldein GP um das Sportzentrum, Gunskirchen	C2/NE	Lander Loockx (BEL)	Unibet Tietema Rockets	
15 December 2025	2025–26 Cycling Austria Cup #7 – CX-Mas Cross Vol 3, Gerasdorf bei Wien	NE	Jakob Reiter (AUT)	Hrinkow Bikes Steyr	

=== 2025–26 Cycling Belarus Cup ===
Date	Course	Class	Winner	Team	References
8 November 2025	2025–26 Cycling Belarus Cup #1, Mazyr	NE	Dainis Bricis (BLR)		
15 November 2025	2025–26 Cycling Belarus Cup #2, Brest	NE	Dainis Bricis (BLR)		

=== 2025 Belgian CX Series ===
Date	Course	Class	Winner	Team	References	
7 September 2025	(Belgium) 2025 Concap CX Cup 1, Kessel	NE	Bengt Daelmans (BEL)	Cyclis - Van Den Plas		
14 September 2025	(Belgium) 2025 Concap CX Cup 2, Wiekevorst	NE	Yordi Corsus (BEL)	Pauwels Sauzen–Altez Industriebouw Cycling Team		
20 September 2025	(Belgium) 2025 Concap CX Cup 3, Palm Cross, Steenhuffel	NE	Bengt Daelmans (BEL)	Cyclis - Van Den Plas		
28 September 2025	(Belgium) Cyclo-cross de Thuin, Thuin	NE	Clément Horny (BEL)	BH-Wallonie MTB Team		Not part of Concap CX Cup
12 October 2025	(Belgium) 2025 Concap CX Cup 4, Patattencross Nossegem, Nossegem	NE	Bengt Daelmans (BEL)	Cyclis - Van Den Plas		
18 October 2025	(Belgium) 2025 Concap CX Cup 5, Eversel	NE	Ingmar Uytdewilligen (BEL)	VP Consulting Cycling Team		
26 October 2025	(Belgium) 2025 Concap CX Cup 6, De Tomaten Cross, Herenthout	NE	Arthur Soontjens (BEL)	Cyclis - Van Den Plas		
8 November 2025	(Belgium) Cyclocross Rijkevorsel, Rijkevorsel	NE	Arthur Soontjens (BEL)	Cyclis - Van Den Plas		Not part of Concap CX Cup
15 November 2025	(Belgium) 2025 Concap CX Cup 7, Ravestein Parkcross, Hever	NE	Arthur Soontjens (BEL)	Cyclis - Van Den Plas		
30 November 2025	(Belgium) 2025 Concap CX Cup 8, Meulebeke	NE	Arthur Soontjens (BEL)	Cyclis - Van Den Plas		
26 December 2025	(Belgium) 2025 Concap CX Cup 9, Beernem	NE	Bengt Daelmans (BEL)	Cyclis - Van Den Plas		
27 December 2025	(Belgium) Kampioenschap van Vlaanderen, Tongeren-Borgloon	NE	Bengt Daelmans (BEL)	Cyclis - Van Den Plas		Not part of Concap CX Cup
3 January 2026	(Belgium) 2025 Concap CX Cup 10, Vilvoorde	NE	Arthur Soontjens (BEL)	Cyclis - Van Den Plas		
17 January 2026	(Belgium) 2025 Concap CX Cup 11, Gierle	NE	Lars Daelmans (BEL)	Pauwels Sauzen–Altez Industriebouw Cycling Team		
18 January 2026	(Belgium) 2025 Concap CX Cup 12, Bekkevoort	NE	Arthur Soontjens (BEL)	Cyclis - Van Den Plas		
25 January 2026	(Belgium) 2025 Concap CX Cup 13, Meer	NE	Stan Van Grieken (BEL)	Stageco Cycling Team		

=== Copa Chile CX 2025 ===
Date	Course	Class	Winner	Team	References
20 April 2025	2025 Chile CX Cup 1, Cerro Navia	NE	Juan Pablo Agloni (CHI)		
18 May 2025	2025 Chile CX Cup 2, Curacaví	NE	Juan Pablo Agloni (CHI)		
14 June 2025	2025 Chile CX Cup 3, Bio Bio	NE	Juan Pablo Agloni (CHI)		
6 July 2025	2025 Chile CX Cup 4, Santiago	NE	Patricio Campbell (CHI)		
27 July 2025	2025 Chile CX Cup 5, Santiago	NE	Juan Pablo Agloni (CHI)		
10 August 2025	2025 Chile CX Cup 6, Noviciado	NE	Juan Pablo Agloni (CHI)		
24 August 2025	2025 Chile CX Cup 7, Valdivia	NE	Juan Pablo Agloni (CHI)		
27 September	2025 Chile CX Cup 8, Santiago	NE	Juan Pablo Agloni (CHI)		

=== 2025–2026 HSF System Cup ===
Date	Course	Class	Winner	Team	References
4 October 2025	(Czech Republic) HSF System Cup #1, Uničov	C2/NE	Michael Boroš (CZE)	Kasper Crypto4me	
5 October 2025	(Czech Republic) HSF System Cup #2, Rýmařov	NE	—N/a	—N/a	
18 October 2025	(Czech Republic) HSF System Cup #3, Mladá Boleslav	C2/NE	Václav Ježek (CZE)	Brilon Racing Team MB	
25 October 2025	(Czech Republic) HSF System Cup #4, Hlinsko	C2/NE	Václav Ježek (CZE)	Brilon Racing Team MB	
1 November 2025	(Czech Republic) HSF System Cup #5, Jičín	C2/NE	Václav Ježek (CZE)	Brilon Racing Team MB	
17 November 2025	(Czech Republic) HSF System Cup #6, Veselí nad Lužnicí	C2/NE	Václav Ježek (CZE)	Brilon Racing Team MB	
29 November 2025	(Czech Republic) HSF System Cup #7, Kolín	C2/NE	Kryštof Bažant (CZE)		
6 December 2025	(Czech Republic) HSF System Cup #8, Chýnov	NE	—N/a	—N/a	
13 December 2025	(Czech Republic) HSF System Cup #9, Holé Vrchy	C2/NE	Václav Ježek (CZE)	Brilon Racing Team MB	

=== 2025 Danish Challenge Cross–Cup ===
Date	Course	Class	Winner	Team	References
26 October 2025	(Denmark) Danish Challenge Cross–Cup I, Roskilde	NE	Daniel Weis Nielsen (DEN)	Decathlon–AG2R La Mondiale Development Team	
2 November 2025	(Denmark) Danish Challenge Cross–Cup II, Kalundborg	NE	Karl-Erik Rosendahl (DEN)	ARBÖ MiKo PV ON-Fahrrad	
9 November 2025	(Denmark) Danish Challenge Cross–Cup III, Odense	NE	Karl-Erik Rosendahl (DEN)	ARBÖ MiKo PV ON-Fahrrad	
23 November 2025	(Denmark) Danish Challenge Cross–Cup IV, Sorø	NE	Mathias Houmann Petersen (DEN)	Tscherning Cycling Academy	
13 December 2025	(Denmark) Danish Challenge Cross–Cup V, Holbæk	NE	Johannes Brædstrup-Holm (DEN)	Holte MTB Klub	

=== 2025 BikeFanatics CX Karikasari ===
Date	Course	Class	Winner	Team	References
28 September 2025	(Estonia) BikeFanatics CX Karikasari #1, Viljandi	NE	Matthias Mõttus (EST)	Haanja Cycling Club	
4 October 2025	(Estonia) BikeFanatics CX Karikasari #2, Elva	NE	Matīss Kaļveršs (LVA)	Salaspils/Zīriņi	
11 October 2025	(Estonia) BikeFanatics CX Karikasari #3, Rapla County	NE	Markus Mäeuibo (EST)	Charvieu-Chavagneux IC	
18 October 2025	(Estonia) BikeFanatics CX Karikasari #4, Tallinn	NE	Markus Mäeuibo (EST)	Charvieu-Chavagneux IC	
25 October 2025	(Estonia) BikeFanatics CX Karikasari #5, Rakke	NE	Sebastian Suppi (EST)	CFC Spordiklubi	

=== 2025–2026 Finnish CX Cup ===
Date	Course	Class	Winner	Team	References
20 September 2025	(Finland) Finnish CX Cup #1, Lieto	NE	Miko Pirinen (FIN)	IBD Cycling	
27 September 2025	(Finland) Finnish CX Cup #2, Nurmijärvi	NE	Miko Pirinen (FIN)	IBD Cycling	
5 October 2025	(Finland) Finnish CX Cup #3, Valkeala	NE	Miko Pirinen (FIN)	IBD Cycling	
18 October 2025	(Finland) Finnish CX Cup #4, Tuusula	NE	Miko Pirinen (FIN)	IBD Cycling	
26 October 2025	(Finland) Finnish CX Cup #5, Olari	NE	Miko Pirinen (FIN)	IBD Cycling	
2 November 2025	(Finland) Finnish CX Cup #6, Helsinki	NE	Miko Pirinen (FIN)	IBD Cycling	

=== 2025–2026 French Cup Series ===
Date	Course	Class	Winner	Team	References
25 October 2025	(France) 2025–2026 French Cup Series #1, Albi	C2/NE	Aubin Sparfel (FRA)		
26 October 2025	(France) 2025–2026 French Cup Series #2, Albi	C2/NE	Aubin Sparfel (FRA)		
15 November 2025	(France) 2025–2026 French Cup Series #3, Quelneuc	C2/NE	Aubin Sparfel (FRA)		
16 November 2025	(France) 2025–2026 French Cup Series #4, Quelneuc	C2/NE	Aubin Sparfel (FRA)		
14 December 2025	(France) 2025–2026 French Cup Series #5, Ouistreham	C2/NE	Gerben Kuypers (BEL)	Charles Liégeois Roastery CX	

=== 2025 German CX Bundesliga ===
Date	Course	Class	Winner	Team	References
20 September 2025	(Germany) 2025 German Bundesliga CX #1 – International Cyclo-Cross Bad Salzdetfurth #1, Bad Salzdetfurth	C2/NE	Kevin Kuhn (SUI)	Heizomat - Cube	
21 September 2025	(Germany) 2025 German Bundesliga CX #2 – International Cyclo-Cross Bad Salzdetfurth #2, Bad Salzdetfurth	C2/NE	Witse Meeussen (BEL)	Crelan - Corendon	
4 October 2025	(Germany) 2025 German Bundesliga CX #3 – Bauhaus Perlcross #1, Perl	NE	Silas Kuschla (GER)	Stevens Racing Team	
5 October 2025	(Germany) 2025 German Bundesliga CX #4 – Bauhaus Perlcross #2, Perl	NE	Silas Kuschla (GER)	Stevens Racing Team	
11 October 2025	(Germany) 2025 German Bundesliga CX #5 – GaloppCross 4.0, Bremen	NE	Eike Behrens (GER)	Stevens Racing Team	
12 October 2025	(Germany) 2025 German Bundesliga CX #6 – Rund um den Lohner Aussichtsturm, Löhne	NE	Luca Harter (GER)	Stevens Racing Team	
19 October 2025	(Germany) 2025 German Bundesliga CX #7 – 3. Cyclo-Cross Rennen in Wörth a. d. Donau, Wörth an der Donau	NE	Fabian Eder (GER)	Heizomat Radteam	
26 October 2025	(Germany) 2025 German Bundesliga CX #8 – 5. Munich Super Cross, München	NE	Luca Harter (GER)	Stevens Racing Team	
2 November 2025	(Germany) 2025 German Bundesliga CX #9 – Rund um die Chemnitzer Radrennbahn, Chemnitz	C2/NE	Hannes Degenkolb (GER)	Heizomat - Cube	
8 November 2025	(Germany) 2025 German Bundesliga CX #10 – Vaihinger Radcross 2025, Vaihingen an der Enz	NE	Florian Hamm (GER)	Syntace CX	
9 November 2025	(Germany) 2025 German Bundesliga CX #11 – Magstadter Radcross, Magstadt	NE	Jonas Köpsel (GER)	Peter Pane Nagel CX Team	
15 November 2025	(Germany) 2025 German Bundesliga CX #12 – Stahnsdorf Cross Day 1, Stahnsdorf	NE	Eike Behrens (GER)	Stevens Racing Team	
16 November 2025	(Germany) 2025 German Bundesliga CX #13 – Stahnsdorf Cross Day 2, Stahnsdorf	NE	Eike Behrens (GER)	Stevens Racing Team	
22 November 2025	(Germany) 2025 German Bundesliga CX #14 – Regional Championships	NE	(Thuringia) Florian Anderle	Team ROCKETS OR	
29 November 2025	(Germany) 2025 German Bundesliga CX #14 – Regional Championships	NE	(North Rhine-Westphalia) Marcel Meisen	RC Zugvogel 09 Aachen	
30 November 2025	(Germany) 2025 German Bundesliga CX #14 – Regional Championships	NE	(Berlin) Jan Kohnen	Team Isaac Torgau	
6 December 2025	(Germany) 2025 German Bundesliga CX #14 – Regional Championships	NE	(Saxony-Anhalt) Tobias Schreiber (Lower Saxony) Tim Stöver	Radprofi Racing Team CX	
7 December 2025	(Germany) 2025 German Bundesliga CX #14.1 – Regional Championships	NE	(Bremen (state)) (Hamburg) Oke Neumann (Hesse) Jan Laurin Zeißler (Mecklenburg-Vorpommern) Martin Stephan (Saarland) (Brandenburg) / (Saxony) Toni Albrecht (Schleswig-Holstein) Frederik von Hartwig (Rhineland-Palatinate) Nick Willner (Baden-Württemberg) Max Pfeil		
13 December 2025	(Germany) 2025 German Bundesliga CX #15 – Königshammer Cross, Baiersbronn	NE	Wanja Russenberger (SUI)	RV Merishausen	
14 December 2025	(Germany) 2025 German Bundesliga CX #16 – Königshammer Cross, Baiersbronn	NE	Florian Hamm (GER)	Syntace	
4 January 2026	(Germany) 2025 German Bundesliga CX #17 – , Vechta	NE	Eike Behrens (GER)	Stevens Racing Team	

=== 2025–2026 British National Trophy Series ===
Date	Course	Class	Winner	Team	References
5 October 2025	(United Kingdom) National Trophy Series #1 – Derby, Derby	C2/NE	Thomas Mein (GBR)	Hope Factory Racing	
19 October 2025	(United Kingdom) National Trophy Series #2 - Falkirk, Falkirk	C2/NE	Thomas Mein (GBR)	Hope Factory Racing	
2 November 2025	(United Kingdom) National Trophy Series #3 - Clanfield, Clanfield	C2/NE	Thomas Mein (GBR)	Hope Factory Racing	
16 November 2025	(United Kingdom) National Trophy Series #4 - West Bromwich, West Bromwich	C2/NE	Thomas Mein (GBR)	Hope Factory Racing	
7 December 2025	(United Kingdom) National Trophy Series #5 - Bradford, Bradford	C2/NE	Thomas Mein (GBR)	Hope Factory Racing	
3 January 2026	(United Kingdom) National Trophy Series #6 - Irvine, Irvine	NE	Cancelled		

=== 2025 Hungarian CX Series ===
Date	Course	Class	Winner	Team	References
12 October 2025	(Hungary) Hungarian CX Series, Kermann IT Cyclo-Cross Challenge #1, Kőbánya	NE	Zsolt Búr (HUN)	Vialand Racing Team	
19 October 2025	(Hungary) Hungarian CX Series, Kermann IT Cyclo-Cross Challenge #2, Kiskunlacháza	NE	Zsolt Búr (HUN)	Vialand Racing Team	
2 November 2025	(Hungary) Hungarian CX Series, DSI Cross Debrecen, Debrecen	C2/NE	Zsombor Tamás Takács (HUN)		
23 November 2025	(Hungary) Hungarian CX Series, NYKSE Robinson Cyclo-Cross Magyar Kupa, Nyíregyháza	NE	Gergely Kiss (HUN)		
7 December 2025	(Hungary) Hungarian CX Series, Újbuda Cyclo-cross Magyar Kupa, Budapest	NE	Boldizsár Zsembery (HUN)	MBH Bank Cycling Team	
13 December 2025	(Hungary) Hungarian CX Series, Velopark Grand Prix UCI C1, Debrecen	C1/NE	Zsombor Tamás Takács (HUN)		
14 December 2025	(Hungary) Hungarian CX Series, Velopark Grand Prix UCI C2, Debrecen	C2/NE	Zsombor Tamás Takács (HUN)		
3 January 2026	(Hungary) Hungarian CX Series, Kermann IT Cyclo-Cross Challenge #3, Etyek	NE	Zsolt Búr (HUN)	Vialand Racing Team	

=== 2025 Irish National Cyclo-Cross Series ===
Date	Course	Class	Winner	Team	References
12 October 2025	(Republic of Ireland) 2025 Irish National Cyclo-Cross Series #1, Belfast	NE	Richard Barry (IRL)	St. Finbarrs CC	
26 October 2025	(Republic of Ireland) 2025 Irish National Cyclo-Cross Series #2, Glencullen	NE	Robin Seymour (IRL)	Team WORC	
30 November 2025	(Republic of Ireland) 2025 Irish National Cyclo-Cross Series #3, Limerick	NE	Dean Harvey (IRL)	Martigues Sport Cyclisme	
4 January 2026	(Republic of Ireland) 2025 Irish National Cyclo-Cross Series #4, Ballinasloe	NE	Dean Harvey (IRL)	Martigues Sport Cyclisme	

=== 2025 Campionato Italiano Società CX ===
Date	Course	Class	Winner	Team	References
5 October 2025	(Italy) Trofeo Città Di Tarvisio Internazionale – Campionato Italiano Società CX #1, Tarvisio	C2/NE	Stefano Viezzi (ITA)	Alpecin–Premier Tech Development Team	
12 October 2025	(Italy) #1 Prova Mediterraneo Cross – NE – 13° Trofeo Ciclocross Città di Viggiano – Campionato Italiano Società CX #2, Viggiano	NE	Marco Russo (ITA)	Team Go Fast Puglia Aradeo	
19 October 2025	(Italy) Zoncross Classic Sutrio 2025 – Campionato Italiano Società CX #3, Sutrio	C2/NE	Filippo Fontana (ITA)	CS Carabinieri Cicli Olympia	
1 November 2025	(Italy) Trofeo Citta' di Firenze – Campionato Italiano Società CX #4, Mugello Circuit	C2/NE	Filippo Fontana (ITA)	CS Carabinieri Cicli Olympia	
8 December 2025	(Italy) 10° Trofeo Città di Belvedere Marittimo CX – Campionato Italiano Società CX #5, Belvedere Marittimo	NE	Salvatore Lo Monaco (ITA)	Team Race Mountain	
6 January 2026	(Italy) Nazionale Ciclocross – Campionato Italiano Società CX #6, Seregno	NE	Ettore Fabbro (ITA)	ASD DP66 Pinarello	

=== 2025–26 JCF Cyclocross Series ===
Date	Course	Class	Winner	Team	References
5 October 2025	(Japan) Ibaraki Cyclocross Tsuchiura Stage – JCF Cyclocross Series #1, Tsuchiura	NE	Hikaru Kosaka (JPN)	Utsunomiya Lux	
26 October 2025	(Japan) Tohoku Cyclocross Series 2025 Watari Round – JCF Cyclocross Series #2, Watari	NE	Toki Sawada (JPN)	Astemo Utsunomiya Blitzen	
2 November 2025	(Japan) Gotemba Cyclocross – JCF Cyclocross Series #3, Gotemba	NE	Tatsuumi Soejima (JPN)	TRK Works	
9 November 2025	(Japan) Makuhari Cross 2025 – JCF Cyclocross Series #4, Chiba	NE	Hijiri Oda (JPN)	Yowamushi Pedal	
23 November 2025	(Japan) Kansai Cyclocross Lake Biwa Grand Prix – JCF Cyclocross Series #5, Kusatsu	C2/NE	Hijiri Oda (JPN)	Yowamushi Pedal	
24 November 2025	(Japan) Tokai Cyclocross – JCF Cyclocross Series #6, Inazawa	NE	Hijiri Oda (JPN)	Yowamushi Pedal	
29 November 2025	(Japan) Matsubushi Cyclocross – JCF Cyclocross Series #7, Matsubushi	NE	Hijiri Oda (JPN)	Yowamushi Pedal	
6 December 2025	(Japan) Utsunomiya Cyclo-cross Day 1 – JCF Cyclocross Series #8, Utsunomiya	C2/NE	Hijiri Oda (JPN)	Yowamushi Pedal	
7 December 2025	(Japan) Utsunomiya Cyclo-cross Day 2 – JCF Cyclocross Series #9, Utsunomiya	C2/NE	Hijiri Oda (JPN)	Yowamushi Pedal	
18 January 2025	(Japan) Zaousama Cup Tohoku Cyclocross 2026 – JCF Cyclocross Series #10, Zaō	NE	Issei Matsumoto (JPN)	W.V.OTA	
25 January 2025	(Japan) Saving Yamaguchi Cyclocross Yamaguchi Kirara Expo Memorial Park Tournament – JCF Cyclocross Series #11, Yamaguchi	NE	Yuta Uchino (JPN)	CLICK Yawata	
7–8 February 2025	(Japan) Cyclocross Tokyo – JCF Cyclocross Series #12, Tokyo	NE	Kiyoshi Oda (JPN)	Yowamushi Pedal	

=== 2025 Latvian CX Cup Series ===
Date	Course	Class	Winner	Team	References
5 October 2025	(Latvia) 2025 Latvian CX Cup Series, Valmiera CX, Valmiera	NE	Matīss Kaļveršs (LVA)	Salaspils/ Zīriņi	
12 October 2025	(Latvia) 2025 Latvian CX Cup Series, Dobeles velokross, Dobele	NE	Matīss Kaļveršs (LVA)	Salaspils/ Zīriņi	
18 October 2025	(Latvia) 2025 Latvian CX Cup Series, Veloaplis 2025, Smiltene	NE	Kārlis Klismets (LVA)	Energus Cycling Team	
26 October 2025	(Latvia) 2025 Latvian CX Cup Series, Kuldīgas NSS Atklātās meistarsacīkstes krosā, Kuldīga	NE	Oskars Muižnieks (LVA)	DTG MY Sport	

=== 2025 Lithuanian CX Cup Series ===
Date	Course	Class	Winner	Team	References
7 September 2025	(Lithuania) 2025 Lithuanian CX Cup Series, Vingis Park, Vilnius	NE	Lukas Talačka (LTU)	Top Team Cycling Vilnius	
28 September 2025	(Lithuania) 2025 Lithuanian CX Cup Series, Kėdainiai	NE	Lukas Talačka (LTU)	Top Team Cycling Vilnius	
19 October 2025	(Lithuania) 2025 Lithuanian CX Cup Series, Velocx International CX Race Vilnius, Smiltene	C2/NE	Szymon Pomian (POL)	Mazowsze Serce Polski	
26 October 2025	(Lithuania) 2025 Lithuanian CX Cup Series, Utena	NE	Rokas Kmieliauskas (LTU)	Energus Cycling Team	

=== 2025–2026 ŠKODA Cross Cup ===
Date	Course	Class	Winner	Team	References
12 October 2025	(Luxembourg) 2025–2026 ŠKODA Cross Cup #1 – Festival du Cyclo-Cross "Memorial Claude Michely" / CT Kayldall, Kayl	NE	Timothé Gabriel (FRA)	VCU Schwenheim	
18 October 2025	(Luxembourg) 2025–2026 ŠKODA Cross Cup #2 – Urban Nightcross "Memorial Claude Michely" / CT Kayldall, Reckange-sur-Mess	NE	Elio Clarysse (BEL)	CT Keukens Buysse Knesselare VZW	
19 October 2025	(Luxembourg) 2025–2026 ŠKODA Cross Cup #3 – Cyclo Cross régional / UC Munnerëfer Velosfrënn, Mondorf-les-Bains	NE	Théo Jung (FRA)	VC Communautaire Hettange	
26 October 2025	(Luxembourg) 2025–2026 ŠKODA Cross Cup #4 – Grand Prix de la Commune de Contern, Contern	NE	Wout Janssen (BEL)		
22 November 2025	(Luxembourg) 2025–2026 ŠKODA Cross Cup #5 – Championnat du Monde Militaire de Cyclo-Cross / Team Toproad, Diekirch	NE	Loïc Bettendorff (LUX)	Hrinkow Advarics	
23 November 2025	(Luxembourg) 2025–2026 ŠKODA Cross Cup #6 – Festival de Cyclo-Cross, Cessange	NE	Loïc Bettendorff (LUX)	Hrinkow Advarics	
30 November 2025	(Luxembourg) 2025–2026 ŠKODA Cross Cup #7 – Cyclocross Schëffleng, Schifflange	NE	Théo Jung (FRA)	VC Hettange Grande	
7 December 2025	(Luxembourg) 2025–2026 ŠKODA Cross Cup #8 – GP Commune de Préizerdaul, Préizerdaul	NE	Loïc Bettendorff (LUX)	Hrinkow Advarics	
14 December 2025	(Luxembourg) 2025–2026 ŠKODA Cross Cup #9 – Cyclo Cross UCN Ettelbruck, Ettelbruck	NE	Elio Clarysse (BEL)	CT Keukens Buysse Knesselare VZW	
26 December 2025	(Luxembourg) 2025–2026 ŠKODA Cross Cup #10 – Cyclocross de Differdange, Differdange	NE	Loïc Bettendorff (LUX)	Hrinkow Advarics	
4 January 2026	(Luxembourg) 2025–2026 ŠKODA Cross Cup #11 – , Alzingen	NE	Loïc Bettendorff (LUX)	Hrinkow Advarics	

=== 2025–2026 Netherlands CX Series ===
Date	Course	Class	Winner	Team	References
14 September 2025	2025 Netherlands CX Series, Kleeberg Cross, Mechelen	C2/NE	Witse Meeussen (BEL)	Crelan - Corendon	
12 October 2025	2025 Netherlands CX Series, NL Cup: Nationale & Jeugdveldrit Norg, Norg	NE	David Haverdings (NED)	Baloise Verzekeringen–Het Poetsbureau Lions	
18 October 2025	2025 Netherlands CX Series, NL Cup: Helmcross, Helmond	NE	Miel Storms (NED)	WILVO Group - TWC de Kempen	
19 October 2025	2025 Netherlands CX Series, GP Oisterwijk, Oisterwijk	C2	Cancelled		
18 October 2025	2025 Netherlands CX Series, Nationale Veldrit Almelo 15+, Almelo	NE	Emiel Jansman (NED)	Cycle Club 75	
21 October 2025	2025 Netherlands CX Series, Kiremko Nacht van Woerden, Woerden	C2/NE	Felipe Orts (ESP)	Ridley Racing Team	
25 October 2025	2025 Netherlands CX Series, Exact Cross Heerderstrand, Heerde	C2/NE	Joris Nieuwenhuis (NED)	Ridley Racing Team	
1 November 2025	2025 Netherlands CX Series, NL Cup: 11e Nationale Veldrit van Rhenen, Rhenen	NE	Danny Turkstra (NED)	WSV de Peddelaars	
16 November 2025	(Netherlands) UCI Col du VAM cross, Wijster	C2/NE	Cancelled		
22 November 2025	2025 Netherlands CX Series, NL Cup: Janet Memorial Veldrit van Hilversum, Laren	NE	Ingmar Uytdewilligen (BEL)		
30 November 2025	2025 Netherlands CX Series, NL Cup: De bultcross Leiden - dag 2, Leiden	NE	Brian de Vries (NED)	WSV Ooststellingwerf	
6 December 2025	2025 Netherlands CX Series, NL Cup: 44e Nationale Veldrit van Amersfoort, Amersfoort	NE	Ingmar Uytdewilligen (BEL)		
7 December 2025	2025 Netherlands CX Series, Nationaal veldrit Nijverdal, Nijverdal	NE	Miel Storms (NED)	WILVO Group - TWC de Kempen	
13 December 2025	2025 Netherlands CX Series, Nationale veldrit Gerrit Pluimers sr. Enter, Enter	NE	Danny Turkstra (NED)	WSV de Peddelaars	
21 December 2025	2025 Netherlands CX Series, NL Cup: APW Auto's Veldrit van Reusel, Reusel	NE	Ingmar Uytdewilligen (BEL)		
4 January 2026	2025 Netherlands CX Series, NL Cup: 21e Kasteelcross Vorden, Vorden	NE	Danny Turkstra (NED)	WSV de Peddelaars	
25 January 2026	(Netherlands) Bommelcross, Zaltbommel	NE	Cancelled		

=== 2025 Norway CX Cup Series ===
Date	Course	Class	Winner	Team	References
11 October 2025	Norway CX Cup Series, Føyka Kross Day 1, Asker	NE	Fredrik Breyer (NOR)	Follo SK	
12 October 2025	Norway CX Cup Series, Føyka Kross Day 2, Asker	NE	Karol Michalski (POL)	Trondheim	
18 October 2025	Norway CX Cup Series, Oslo	NE	Håvard Øiom (NOR)	Ringerike SK	
19 October 2025	Norway CX Cup Series, Vargcross, Oslo	NE	Fredrik Breyer (NOR)	Follo SK	
25 October 2025	Norway CX Cup Series, Hoxmark Cross, Ås	NE	Aksel Laforce (NOR)	Ringerike SK	
26 October 2025	Norway CX Cup Series, Hoxmark Cross, Ås	NE	Oliver Aasgaard (NOR)	Follo SK	
1 November 2025	Norway CX Cup Series, Skien	NE	Kevin Andre Sandli Messel (NOR)	Ringerike SK	
8 November 2025	Norway CX Cup Series, Spikkestad	NE	Cancelled		

=== 2025–26 Polish CX Cup Series ===
Date	Course	Class	Winner	Team	References
18 October 2025	(Poland) 2025–26 Polish CX Cup I, Kluczewsko	NE	Filip Helta (POL)	Mazowsze Serce Polski	
19 October 2025	(Poland) 2025–26 Polish CX Cup II, Kluczbork	NE	Brajan Świder (POL)	Phoenix Cycling Team	
8 November 2025	(Poland) 2025–26 Polish CX Cup III, Piaseczno	NE	Brajan Świder (POL)	JBG-2 Team	
11 November 2025	(Poland) 2025–26 Polish CX Cup IV, Koziegłowy	NE	Marek Konwa (POL)	TJ Auto Škoda Mladá Boleslav	
22 November 2025	(Poland) 2025–26 Polish CX Cup V, Koźminek	NE	Filip Helta (POL)	Mazowsze Serce Polski	
23 November 2025	(Poland) 2025–26 Polish CX Cup VI, Środa Wielkopolska	NE	Filip Helta (POL)	Mazowsze Serce Polski	
29 November 2025	(Poland) 2025–26 Polish CX Cup VII, Gościęcin	NE	Filip Helta (POL)	Mazowsze Serce Polski	
30 November 2025	(Poland) 2025–26 Polish CX Cup VIII, Gościęcin	NE	Ksawier Garnek (POL)	Mazowsze Serce Polski	
6 December 2025	(Poland) 2025–26 Polish CX Cup IX, Włoszakowice	NE	Filip Helta (POL)	Mazowsze Serce Polski	
14 December 2025	(Poland) 2025–26 Polish CX Cup X, Warsaw	NE	Filip Helta (POL)	Mazowsze Serce Polski	
20 December 2025	(Poland) 2025–26 Polish CX Cup XI, Sławno	NE	Krzysztof Domin (POL)	Domin Sport	
21 December 2025	(Poland) 2025–26 Polish CX Cup XII, Włoszczowa	NE	—N/a	—N/a	
28 December 2025	(Poland) 2025–26 Polish CX Cup XIII, Ełk	NE	Szymon Pomian (POL)	Mazowsze Serce Polski	
4 January 2026	(Poland) 2025–26 Polish CX Cup XIV, Trzcianka	NE	Filip Helta (POL)	Mazowsze Serce Polski	

=== 2025 Portuguese CX Cup Series ===
Date	Course	Class	Winner	Team	References
18 October 2025	2025 Portuguese CX Cup Series, Ciclocrosse de Melgaço, Portugal	C1/NE	Gonzalo Inguanzo (ESP)	Supermercados Froiz	
19 October 2025	(Portugal) 2025 Portuguese CX Cup Series, Ciclocrosse Internacional de Vouzela, Vouzela	C2/NE	Timothé Gabriel (FRA)	CX TPM	
26 October 2025	(Portugal) 2025 Portuguese CX Cup Series, Ciclocross Cidade Vila Real, Vila Real	C2/NE	Mario Junquera (ESP)	Unicaja - Gijon	
15 November 2025	(Portugal) 2025 Portuguese CX Cup Series, Abrantes	NE	Bruno Silva (POR)	Boavista/RP/Paredes	
16 November 2025	(Portugal) 2025 Portuguese CX Cup Series, Ansião	NE	Bruno Silva (POR)	Boavista/RP/Paredes	
7 December 2025	(Portugal) 2025 Portuguese CX Cup Series, Vila Boa de Quires	NE	Rafael Sousa (POR)	Guilhabreu MTB Team	

=== 2025 Romanian CX Cup Series ===
Date	Course	Class	Winner	Team	References
19 October 2025	(Romania) 2025 Romanian CX Cup Series, Velocrosul Castanilor, Florești	NE	Eduard-Michael Grosu (ROU)	ACS NoStress	
15 November 2025	(Romania) 2025 Romanian CX Cup Series, Lunca Timișului CX, Moșnița Nouă	C2/NE	Zsombor Tamás Takács (HUN)	MBH Bank CSB Telecom Fort	
16 November 2025	(Romania) 2025 Romanian CX Cup Series, Arad CX Cup, Arad	NE	József Málnási (ROU)	CSM Unirea Alba Iulia-Biciclim	
6 December 2025	(Romania) 2025 Romanian CX Cup Series, Cluj Winter Race, Cluj Napoca	NE	Patrick Pescaru (ROU)	CSU Scott	

=== 2025–26 Russian CX Series ===
Date	Course	Class	Winner	Team	References
5 September 2025	(Russia) 2025–26 Russian CX Series, Urmary	NE	Alexei Zhilyakov (RUS)		
7 September 2025	(Russia) 2025–26 Russian CX Series, Urmary	NE	Alexei Zhilyakov (RUS)		
11 October 2025	(Russia) 2025–26 Russian CX Series, Kopeysk	NE	Pavel Balobanov (RUS)		
19 October 2025	(Russia) 2025–26 Russian CX Series, Yekaterinburg	NE	Maxim Gogolev (RUS)		
26 October 2025	(Russia) 2025–26 Russian CX Series, Izhevsk	NE	Ilya Luzhbin (RUS)		

=== 2025–26 Cycling Serbian Cup ===
Date	Course	Class	Winner	Team	References
7 December 2025	(Serbia) 2025–26 Cycling Serbian Cup #1 – Ciklo Kros Jednota, Šid	NE	Vladislav Nikolajev (RUS)		
21 December 2025	(Serbia) 2025–26 Cycling Serbian Cup #2 – Ciklo Kros Šid, Šid	NE	Vladislav Nikolajev (RUS)		
4 January 2026	(Serbia) 2025–26 Cycling Serbian Cup #3, ?	NE			

=== 2025 Slovak CX Cup Series ===
Date	Course	Class	Winner	Team	References
5 October 2025	(Slovakia) 2025 Slovak CX Cup Series #1, Grand Prix Topoľčianky, Topoľčianky	C2/NE	Václav Ježek (CZE)	Brilon Racing Team MB	
12 October 2025	(Slovakia) 2025 Slovak CX Cup Series, Grand Prix Selce, Selce	C2/NE	Barnabás Vas (HUN)	MBH Bank Ballan CSB	
19 October 2025	(Slovakia) 2025 Slovak CX Cup Series, Grand Prix Levoča, Levoča	C2/NE	František Hojka (CZE)	Expres CZ-BMD Team Kolín	
26 October 2025	(Slovakia) 2025 Slovak CX Cup Series, Grand Prix Podbrezová, Podbrezová	C2/NE	Kryštof Bažant (CZE)	CYKLOSTAR Pirelli	
23 November 2025	(Slovakia) 2025 Netherlands CX Series, Grand Prix Dohňany, Dohňany	NE	Jan Hyneček (CZE)	Ekotrend MTB Team	

=== 2025 Slovenian CX Cup Series ===
Date	Course	Class	Winner	Team	References
16 November 2025	(Slovenia) 2025 Slovenian CX Cup Series, 2. Ciklokros Polzela, Polzela	NE	Mihael Štajnar (SVN)	Pogi Team Gusto Ljubljana	
30 November 2025	(Slovenia) 2025 Slovenian CX Cup Series, 4. Ciklokros Straža, Straža	NE	Filip Utranker (SVN)	KD Celje - 2Simpl	
7 December 2025	(Slovenia) 2025 Slovenian CX Cup Series, 3. CX za Pokal Občine Tišina, Tropovci	NE	Mihael Štajnar (SVN)	Pogi Team Gusto Ljubljana	
14 December 2025	(Slovenia) 2025 Slovenian CX Cup Series, CX Murska Sobota – DP, Murska Sobota	NE	Mihael Štajnar (SVN)	Pogi Team Gusto Ljubljana	
26 December 2025	(Slovenia) 2025 Slovenian CX Cup Series, 5. Ciklokros Ljubljana, Ljubljana	NE	Luka Maksimović (SVN)	Pogi Team UAE Generation	

=== 2025 Copa de España de Ciclocross ===
Date	Course	Class	Winner	Team	References
5 October 2025	(Spain) 2025 Copa de España de Ciclocross #1, Trofeo Villa de Gijón, Gijón	C2/NE	Kevin Suárez Fernández (ESP)	Nesta - MMR CX Team	
12 October 2025	(Spain) 2025 Copa de España de Ciclocross #2, Ciclocross Internacional Xaxancx 2025, Marín	C2/NE	Gonzalo Inguanzo (ESP)		
1 November 2025	(Spain) 2025 Copa de España de Ciclocross #3, Amurrioko Ziklokrossa, Amurrio	C2/NE	Kevin Suárez Fernández (ESP)	Nesta - MMR CX Team	
2 November 2025	(Spain) 2025 Copa de España de Ciclocross #4, Ciclocross Internacional de Karrantza, Karrantza	C2/NE	Gonzalo Inguanzo (ESP)		
16 November 2025	(Spain) 2025 Copa de España de Ciclocross #5, Alcobendas Ciudad Europea del Deporte, Alcobendas	C2/NE	Gonzalo Inguanzo (ESP)		
23 November 2025	(Spain) 2025 Copa de España de Ciclocross #6, Gran Premi Ciclocròs Ciutat de Vic, Vic	C2/NE	Gonzalo Inguanzo (ESP)		
6 December 2025	(Spain) 2025 Copa de España de Ciclocross #7, Ciclocross Internacional Ciutat de Xàtiva, Xàtiva	C2/NE	Felipe Orts (ESP)	Ridley Racing Team	
7 December 2025	(Spain) 2025 Copa de España de Ciclocross #8 - Trofeo Ciclo-Cross Rafa Valls, Cocentaina	C2/NE	Felipe Orts (ESP)	Ridley Racing Team	

=== 2025–2026 Swedish CX Cup Series ===
Date	Course	Class	Winner	Team	References
11 October 2025	(Sweden) Swedish CX Cup Series #1, Fristads CX Täby Day 1, Täby	C2/NE	Clément Horny (BEL)		
12 October 2025	(Sweden) Swedish CX Cup Series #2, Fristads CX Täby Day 2, Täby	C2/NE	Clément Horny (BEL)		
18 October 2025	(Sweden) Swedish CX Cup Series #3, Varberg Cyclocross Day 1, Varberg	C2/NE	Clément Horny (BEL)		
19 October 2025	(Sweden) Swedish CX Cup Series #4, Varberg Cyclocross Day 2, Varberg	C2/NE	Clément Horny (BEL)		
15 November 2025	(Sweden) Swedish CX Cup Series #5, Malmö	NE	Dexter Kock (SWE)	Tyresö CK	
16 November 2025	(Sweden) Swedish CX Cup Series #6, Malmö	NE	Dexter Kock (SWE)	Tyresö CK	

=== 2025–2026 Swiss CX Cup Series ===
Date	Course	Class	Winner	Team	References
12 October 2025	(Switzerland) 64. Internationales Radquer Steinmaur / Swiss Cyclocross Cup #1, Steinmaur	C2/NE	Michael Vanthourenhout (BEL)	Pauwels Sauzen–Cibel Clementines	
19 October 2025	(Switzerland) AlperoseQuer Schneisingen / Swiss Cyclocross Cup #2, Schneisingen	C2/NE	Romain Debord (FRA)	AS Bike Racing - France Literie	
26 October 2025	(Switzerland) 10. Radquer Mettmenstetten / Swiss Cyclocross Cup #3, Mettmenstetten	C2/NE	Théo Thomas (FRA)	Sebmotobikes CX Team	
16 November 2025	(Switzerland) Eagle Cross / Swiss Cyclo Cross Cup #4, Aigle	C2/NE	Théo Thomas (FRA)	Sebmotobikes CX Team	
7 December 2025	(Switzerland) Int. Radquer Hittnau / Swiss Cyclocross Cup #5, Hittnau	C2/NE	Lander Loockx (BEL)	Unibet Tietema Rockets	

=== 2025 TREK USCX Cyclocross Series ===
Date	Course	Class	Winner	Team	References
13 September 2025	(United States) 2025 TREK USCX Cyclocross Series – Virginia’s Blue Ridge Go Cross Day 1, Roanoke	C1/NE	Andrew Strohmeyer (USA)	CXD Trek Bikes	
14 September 2025	(United States) 2025 TREK USCX Cyclocross Series – Virginia’s Blue Ridge Go Cross Day 2, Roanoke	C2/NE	Andrew Strohmeyer (USA)	CXD Trek Bikes	
20 September 2025	(United States) 2025 TREK USCX Cyclocross Series – Rochester Cyclocross Day 1, Rochester	C1/NE	Eric Brunner (USA)	Competitive Edge Racing	
21 September 2025	(United States) 2025 TREK USCX Cyclocross Series – Rochester Cyclocross Day 2, Rochester	C2/NE	Eric Brunner (USA)	Competitive Edge Racing	
27 September 2025	(United States) 2025 TREK USCX Cyclocross Series – Charm City Cross Day 1, Baltimore	C1/NE	Andrew Strohmeyer (USA)	CXD Trek Bikes	
28 September 2025	(United States) 2025 TREK USCX Cyclocross Series – Charm City Cross Day 2, Baltimore	C2/NE	Eric Brunner (USA)	Competitive Edge Racing	
4 October 2025	(United States) 2025 TREK USCX Cyclocross Series – Trek CX Cup Day 1, Waterloo	C1/NE	Eric Brunner (USA)	Competitive Edge Racing	
5 October 2025	(United States) 2025 TREK USCX Cyclocross Series – Trek CX Cup Day 2, Waterloo	C2/NE	Andrew Strohmeyer (USA)	CXD Trek Bikes	

== Rankings Men's Elite ==
=== Australia ===
Full men's elite standings
Rank	Rider	VIC (Victoria (state))	VIC (Victoria (state))	NSW (New South Wales)	NSW (New South Wales)	SA (South Australia)	SA (South Australia)	VIC (Victoria (state))	Total Points
1	(Australia) Cameron Ivory	43 (5)	80 (1)	80 (1)	80 (1)	48 (4)	65 (2)	55 (3)	451
2	(Australia) Campbell McConnell	65 (2)	55 (3)	55 (3)	65 (2)	55 (3)	65 (2)	80 (1)	430
3	(Australia) Christopher Aitken	55 (3)	48 (4)	65 (2)	65 (2)			65 (2)	298
4	(Australia) Tristan Nash					80 (1)	80 (1)	43 (5)	203
5	(Australia) Sam Harberts		29 (8)			55 (3)	43 (5)	65 (2)	192
6	(Australia) Zachary Bryant	29 (8)	25 (9)			25 (9)	33 (7)	38 (6)	192
7	(Australia) Harrison Bebbington	80 (1)	65 (2)						145
8	(Australia) Toby Price					38 (6)	48 (4)	55 (3)	145
9	(Australia) Tom Jenkins			38 (6)	33 (7)			48 (4)	119
10	(Australia) Tom Chester			48 (4)	48 (4)				96
11	(Australia) Otis Jones	48 (4)	43 (5)						91
12	(Australia) Rhys Warrillow	25 (9)	22 (10)					43 (5)	90
13	(Australia) Zach Larsson			43 (5)	43 (5)				86
14	(Australia) Tasman Nankervis							80 (1)	80
15	(Australia) Tom Ovens	38 (6)	38 (6)						76
16	(Australia) Markus Chandler					29 (8)	38 (6)		67
17	(Australia) Ty Whitford	33 (7)	33 (7)						66
18	(Australia) Nicholas Smith							48 (4)	43
19	(Australia) Rohan Wight					43 (5)			43
T20	(Australia) Erik Vetisch				38 (6)				38
T20	(Australia) Mark Matear							38 (6)	38
T23	(Australia) Ben Spenceley			33 (7)					33
T23	(Australia) Griffin Knight					33 (7)			33
T23	(Australia) Ryan McCaffrey							33 (7)	33
T23	(Australia) Charles Wheeler							33 (7)	33
26	(Australia) Jensen Wiesenhaan			29 (8)	1 (DNF)				30
T27	(Australia) Thomas Giraud				29 (8)				29
T27	(Australia) Casey Jacobs						29 (8)		29
T27	(Australia) Lee Omond							29 (8)	29
31	(Australia) Gordon Pipe					25 (9)			25
32	(Australia) Brett Kellett	22 (10)							22
34	(Australia) Finn Kane			1 (DNF)					1

==== Belgium ====
Full Men's elite standings
Rank	Rider	BEL (Belgium)	BEL (Belgium)	BEL (Belgium)	Total Points
1	(Belgium) Robin Alderweireld	38 (2)	38 (2)	38 (2)	114
2	(Belgium) Ingmar Uytdewilligen	30 (6)	34 (4)	32 (5)	96
3	(Belgium) Thomas Verheyen	21 (11)	30 (6)	34 (4)	85
4	(Belgium) Bengt Daelmans	40 (1)		40 (1)	80
5	(Belgium) Elio Clarysse	20 (12)	28 (7)	24 (9)	72
6	(Belgium) Jetze van Campenhout	34 (4)	36 (3)		70
7	(Belgium) Loïc Vanlaere	11 (22)	26 (8)	26 (8)	63
8	(Belgium) Stef Janse		32 (5)	30 (6)	62
9	(Belgium) Fabian Maes	26 (8)		36 (3)	62
10	(Belgium) Jonas Mertens	12 (20)	20 (12)	20 (12)	32
11	(Belgium) Rune Smits	22 (10)		28 (7)	50
12	(Belgium) Brent Op de Beeck	16 (16)	18 (14)	11 (23)	45
13	(Belgium) Jorre Cardijn	11 (23)	19 (13)	15 (17)	30
14	(Belgium) Toon Deckers	11 (27)	17 (15)	17 (15)	45
15	(Belgium) Yordi Corsus		40 (1)		40
16	(Belgium) Jarne Goovaerts	11 (25)	12 (20)	14 (18)	37
17	(Belgium) Arthur Soontjens	36 (3)			36
18	(Belgium) Seppe Segers	11 (24)	24 (9)		35
19	(Belgium) Jens Dekort	11 (29)	11 (23)	11 (21)	33
20	(Belgium) Guillian Demeyer	11 (30)	11 (30)	11 (25)	33
21	(Belgium) François Jacoby	11 (32)	11 (14)	11 (16)	33
22	(Belgium) Jorit Goovaerts	11 (33)	11 (17)	11 (28)	33
23	(Belgium) Miel Oreel	11 (38)	11 (13)	11 (26)	33
24	(Belgium) Lance Cannoot	11 (40)	11 (19)	11 (31)	33
25	(Belgium) Milan Lenaers	11 (41)	11 (21)	11 (32)	33
26	(Belgium) Yens Goris	11 (1 R)	11 (28)	11 (33)	33
27	(Belgium) Rune Mutsaarts	11 (1 R)	11 (33)	11 (34)	33
28	(Belgium) Miles Gevaert	32 (5)			32
29	(Belgium) Kjell Coopman	11 (28)	21 (11)		32
30	(Belgium) Kjell Cooman	11 (31)	11 (24)	10 (DNF)	32
31	(Belgium) Warre Smets	11 (1 R)	11 (34)	10 (DNF)	32
32	(Belgium) Lars Van Loocke		15 (17)	16 (16)	31
33	(Belgium) Ruben Bosmans	13 (19)	16 (16)		29
34	(Belgium) Kilian Moreels	10 (DNF)		19 (13)	29
35	(Belgium) Ward Vleugels	28 (7)			28
36	(Belgium) Toon Van Den Bergh	15 (17)	13 (19)		28
37	(Belgium) Matheo Devallee	11 (26)	14 (18)		25
38	(Belgium) Keano Geens	24 (9)			24
39	(Belgium) Seppe Vanhout	11 (37)	11 (20)		22
40	(Belgium) Ruben Lembrechts		22 (10)		22
41	(Belgium) Lander Liekens	11 (35)		11 (27	22
42	(Belgium) Lennert Lardenoit	11 (39)		11 (29)	22
43	(Belgium) Milan Van der Veken		11 (1 R)	11 (30)	22
44	(Belgium) Toon Heirbaut			22 (10)	21
45	(Belgium) Jaro Debruyne	11 (34)	10 (DNF)		21
46	(Belgium) Tjalle Dries			21 (11)	21
47	(Belgium) Senn Bossaerts	19 (13)			19
48	(Netherlands) Mees de Vos	18 (14)			18
49	(France) Hippolyte Loete			18 (14)	17
50	(Belgium) Niels Ceulemans	17 (15)			17
51	(Belgium) Brett Timmermans	14 (18)			14
52	(Belgium) Joppe Joije			13 (19)	13
53	(Belgium) Brent Maes			12 (20)	12
54	(Belgium) Matisse Arys	11 (21)			11
55	(Belgium) Jasper Vlaeminck	11 (36)			11
56	(Belgium) Willem Janssens	11 (0 R)			11
57	(Belgium) Jonas Rogge		11 (25)		11
58	(Netherlands) Miel Storms			11 (22)	11
59	(Belgium) Pieter Pauwels	10 (DNF)			10
60	(Belgium) Ydris Salomez	10 (DNF)			10
61	(Belgium) Lennert Goovaerts	10 (DNF)			10

==== Netherlands ====
Full Men's elite standings
Rank	Rider	NED (Netherlands)	Total Points
1	(Belgium) Witse Meeussen	30 (1)	30
2	(Netherlands) Mees Hendrikx	29 (2)	29
3	(Belgium) Arthur Soontjens	28 (3)	28
4	(Netherlands) Floris Haverdings	27 (4)	27
5	(Netherlands) Rémon Delnoije	26 (5)	26
6	(Belgium) Wies Nuyens	25 (6)	25
7	(Belgium) Bengt Daelmans	24 (7)	24
8	(Belgium) Fabian Maes	23 (8)	23
9	(Belgium) Tom Meeusen	22 (9)	22
10	(Germany) Max Heiner Oertzen	21 (10)	21
11	(Netherlands) Mees de Vos	20 (11)	20
12	(Netherlands) Emiel Jansman	19 (12)	19
13	(Belgium) Tjalle Dries	18 (13)	18
14	(Belgium) Kilian Moreels	17 (14)	17
15	(Netherlands) Nick Wisse	16 (15)	16
16	(Belgium) Rune Smits	15 (16)	15
17	(Germany) Matteo Oberteicher	14 (17)	14
18	(Netherlands) Lucas Keuning	13 (18)	13
19	(Netherlands) Mike Bronswijk	12 (19)	12
20	(Netherlands) Miel Storms	11 (20)	11
21	(Netherlands) Sven Buskermolen	10 (21)	10
22	(Netherlands) Mart Spijker	9 (22)	9
23	(Netherlands) Patrick Nieuwenhuis	8 (23)	8
24	(Netherlands) Sepp Te Nahuis	7 (24)	7
25	(Belgium) Brent Maes	6 (25)	6
26	(Belgium) Geoffrey Rausch	5 (26)	5
27	(Netherlands) Jasper Liewes	4 (27)	4
28	(Netherlands) Lars Quaedvlieg	3 (28)	3
29	(Sweden) Vilmar Aastrup	2 (29)	2
30	(Netherlands) Bram Meijerink	1 (30)	1
31	(Netherlands) Twan Maarleveld	1 (31)	1
32	(Netherlands) Tobias Landman	1 (32)	1
33	(Netherlands) Sven Verduijn	1 (33)	1
34	(Netherlands) Jari Buskermolen	1 (34)	1
35	(Netherlands) Laurens Keuning	1 (35)	1
36	(Belgium) Keano Geens	0 (DNF)	0
37	(Netherlands) Demiz Hebing	0 (DNF)	0
38	(Netherlands) Joost Spijker	0 (DNF)	0

=== 2025 Spanish CX Cup ===
Full Men's elite standings
Rank	Rider	Asturias	Total Points
1	(Spain) Kevin Suárez Fernández	25 (1)	25
2	(Spain) Mario Junquera	20 (2)	20
3	(Spain) Raúl Mira	16 (3)	16
4	(Spain) Gonzalo Inguanzo	14 (4)	14
5	(France) Matteo Garnier	12 (5)	12
6	(Spain) Unax Galán Cortázar	10 (6)	10
7	(Spain) Miguel Rodríguez Novoa	9 (7)	9
8	(Spain) Miguel Díaz Pérez	8 (8)	8
9	(France) Thibaut Pichon	7 (9)	7
10	(Spain) Sergio Gámez	6 (10)	6
11	(Spain) Ángel Fernández Echevarría	5 (11)	5
12	(Spain) Unax Lombraña	4 (12)	4
13	(Spain) David Ivars Sirera	3 (13)	3
14	(Spain) Martín Díaz Gómez	2 (14)	2
15	(France) Baptiste Carrere	1 (15)	1

== National Cups Women's Elite ==
=== 2025 AusCycling National Cyclo-Cross Series ===
Date	Course	Class	Winner	Team	References
31 May 2025	(Australia) 2025 AusCycling CX National Series Round 1, Geelong	NE	Isabella Flint (AUS)		
1 June 2025	(Australia) 2025 AusCycling CX National Series Round 2, Geelong	NE	Miranda Griffiths (AUS)		
21 June 2025	(Australia) 2025 AusCycling CX National Series Round 3, Sydney	NE	Isabella Flint (AUS)		
22 June 2025	(Australia) 2024 AusCycling CX National Series Round 4, Sydney	NE	Isabella Flint (AUS)		
26 July 2025	(Australia) 2025 AusCycling CX National Series Round 5, Adelaide	NE	Sophie Sutton (AUS)		
27 July 2025	(Australia) 2025 AusCycling CX National Series Round 6, Adelaide	NE	Isabella Flint (AUS)		
17 August 2025	(Australia) 2025 AusCycling CX National Series Round 7, Ballarat	NE	Ruby Taylor (AUS)		

=== 2025–26 Cycling Austria Cup ===
Date	Course	Class	Winner	Team	References
4 October 2025	2025–26 Cycling Austria Cup #1 – Quer durchs Stadion, Pernitz	NE	Silke Mair (AUT)	URC Ried - Rad Ginzinger	
12 October 2025	2025–26 Cycling Austria Cup #2 – King & Queen of Seeschlacht powered by Bikestore.cc, Langenzersdorf	NE	Nadja Heigl (AUT)	KTM Alchemist	
9 November 2025	2025–26 Cycling Austria Cup #3 – GP Ternitz um die Preise des ARBÖ, Ternitz	NE	Silke Mair (AUT)	URC Ried - Rad Ginzinger	
23 November 2025	2025–26 Cycling Austria Cup #4 – Wienenergie Cyclocross Landegg, Landegg	NE	Romana Slavinec (AUT)	ARBÖ Rapso Knittelfeld	
7 December 2025	2025–26 Cycling Austria Cup #5 – 10. Bad Ischler CX, Bad Ischl	NE	Nadja Heigl (AUT)	KTM Alchemist	
8 December 2025	2025–26 Cycling Austria Cup #6 – Int. Sparkassen Querfeldein GP um das Sportzentrum, Gunskirchen	C2/NE	Kristýna Zemanová (CZE)	VIF Cycling Team	
14 December 2025	2025–26 Cycling Austria Cup #7 – CX-Mas Cross Vol 3, Gerasdorf bei Wien	NE	Nadja Heigl (AUT)	KTM Alchemist	

=== 2025 Belgian CX Series ===
Date	Course	Class	Winner	Team	References	
7 September 2025	(Belgium) 2025 Concap CX Cup 1, Kessel	NE	Kim Van De Steene (BEL)	Never Give Up by Jolien Verschueren		
14 September 2025	(Belgium) 2025 Concap CX Cup 2, Wiekevorst	NE	Elise Vander Sande (BEL)	Keukens Redant Cycling Team		
20 September 2025	(Belgium) 2025 Concap CX Cup 3, Palm Cross, Steenhuffel	NE	Kim Van De Steene (BEL)	Never Give Up by Jolien Verschueren		
28 September 2025	(Belgium) Cyclo-cross de Thuin, Thuin	NE	Adèle Hurteloup (FRA)	Velopro-EGS Group-Alpha Motorhomes		Not part of Concap CX Cup
5 October 2025	(Belgium) Baal (Sven Nys Cycling Center), Tremelo	NE	Joyce Vanderbeken (BEL)	Bike Advice CT		Not part of Concap CX Cup
12 October 2025	(Belgium) 2025 Concap CX Cup 5, Patattencross Nossegem, Nossegem	NE	Liene Meeusen (BEL)	Vanomobil MTB Cycling Team		
18 October 2025	(Belgium) 2025 Concap CX Cup 5, Eversel	NE	Zita Peeters (BEL)	De Ceuster - ACROG		
26 October 2025	(Belgium) 2025 Concap CX Cup 6, De Tomaten Cross, Herenthout	NE	Lien Schampaert (BEL)	Golazo Young Lions		
8 November 2025	(Belgium) Cyclocross Rijkevorsel, Rijkevorsel	NE	Lentel Huys (BEL)	Team Kempen Cycling VZW		Not part of Concap CX Cup
15 November 2025	(Belgium) 2025 Concap CX Cup 7, Ravestein Parkcross, Hever	NE	Joyce Vanderbeken (BEL)	Bike Advice CT		
22 November 2025	(Belgium) Cyclocross Maldegem, Maldegem	NE	Kim Van De Steene (BEL)	Never Give Up by Jolien Verschueren		Not part of Concap CX Cup
30 November 2025	(Belgium) 2025 Concap CX Cup 8, Meulebeke	NE	Kim Van De Steene (BEL)	Never Give Up by Jolien Verschueren		
26 December 2025	(Belgium) 2025 Concap CX Cup 9, Beernem	NE	Lara Defour (BEL)	Cycling Team Jade–LDL		
27 December 2025	(Belgium) Kampioenschap van Vlaanderen, Tongeren-Borgloon	NE	Joyce Vanderbeken (BEL)	Bike Advice CT		Not part of Concap CX Cup
3 January 2026	(Belgium) 2025 Concap CX Cup 10, Vilvoorde	NE	Joyce Vanderbeken (BEL)	Bike Advice CT		
17 January 2026	(Belgium) 2025 Concap CX Cup 11, Gierle	NE	Adèle Hurteloup (FRA)	Velopro-EGS Group-Alpha Motorhomes		
18 January 2026	(Belgium) 2025 Concap CX Cup 12, Bekkevoort	NE	Joyce Vanderbeken (BEL)	Bike Advice CT		
25 January 2026	(Belgium) 2025 Concap CX Cup 13, Meer	NE	Lotte Baele (BEL)	De Ceuster-Bouwpunt		

=== 2025–26 Cycling Belarus Cup ===
Date	Course	Class	Winner	Team	References
8 November 2025	2025–26 Cycling Belarus Cup #1, Mazyr	NE	Anastasiia Kuznetsova (BLR)		
15 November 2025	2025–26 Cycling Belarus Cup #2, Brest	NE	Anastasiia Kuznetsova (BLR)		

=== Copa Chile CX 2025 ===
Date	Course	Class	Winner	Team	References
20 April 2025	2025 Chile CX Cup 1, Cerro Navia	NE	Fernanda Castro (CHI)		
18 May 2025	2025 Chile CX Cup 2, Curacaví	NE	Fernanda Castro (CHI)		
14 June 2025	2025 Chile CX Cup 3, Bio Bio	NE	Bárbara Palma (CHI)		
6 July 2025	2025 Chile CX Cup 4, Santiago	NE	Verena Horman (CHI)		
27 July 2025	2025 Chile CX Cup 5, Santiago	NE	Fernanda Castro (CHI)		
10 August	2025 Chile CX Cup 6, Noviciado	NE	Fernanda Castro (CHI)		
24 August 2025	2025 Chile CX Cup 7, Valdivia	NE	Daniela Rojas (CHI)		
27 September	2025 Chile CX Cup 8, Santiago	NE	Florencia Monsalve (CHI)		

=== 2025–2026 HSF System Cup ===
Date	Course	Class	Winner	Team	References
4 October 2025	(Czech Republic) HSF System Cup #1, Uničov	C2/NE	Kristýna Zemanová (CZE)	VIF Cycling Team	
5 October 2025	(Czech Republic) HSF System Cup #2, Rýmařov	NE	—N/a	—N/a	
18 October 2025	(Czech Republic) HSF System Cup #3, Mladá Boleslav	C2/NE	Kristýna Zemanová (CZE)	VIF Cycling Team	
25 October 2025	(Czech Republic) HSF System Cup #4, Hlinsko	C2/NE	Kristýna Zemanová (CZE)	VIF Cycling Team	
1 November 2025	(Czech Republic) HSF System Cup #5, Jičín	C2/NE	Barbora Bukovská (CZE)		
17 November 2025	(Czech Republic) HSF System Cup #6, Veselí nad Lužnicí	C2/NE	Kristýna Zemanová (CZE)	VIF Cycling Team	
29 November 2025	(Czech Republic) HSF System Cup #7, Kolín	C2/NE	Kristýna Zemanová (CZE)	VIF Cycling Team	
6 December 2025	(Czech Republic) HSF System Cup #8, Chýnov	NE	—N/a	—N/a	
13 December 2025	(Czech Republic) HSF System Cup #9, Holé Vrchy	C2/NE	Barbora Bukovská (CZE)		

=== 2025 Danish Challenge Cross–Cup ===
Date	Course	Class	Winner	Team	References
26 October 2025	(Denmark) Danish Challenge Cross–Cup I, Roskilde	NE	Ann-Dorthe Lisbygd (DEN)	Dansk Mountainbike Klub	
2 November 2025	(Denmark) Danish Challenge Cross–Cup II, Kalundborg	NE	Ann-Dorthe Lisbygd (DEN)	Dansk Mountainbike Klub	
9 November 2025	(Denmark) Danish Challenge Cross–Cup III, Odense	NE	Elsa Widell (SWE)	Borås CA	
23 November 2025	(Denmark) Danish Challenge Cross–Cup IV, Sorø	NE	Ann-Dorthe Lisbygd (DEN)	Dansk Mountainbike Klub	
13 December 2025	(Denmark) Danish Challenge Cross–Cup V, Holbæk	NE	Mathilde Leegaard (DEN)	Dansk Mountainbike Klub	

=== 2025 BikeFanatics CX Karikasari ===
Date	Course	Class	Winner	Team	References
28 September 2025	(Estonia) BikeFanatics CX Karikasari #1, Viljandi	NE	Mari-Liis Mõttus (EST)	Haanja Rattaklubi	
4 October 2025	(Estonia) BikeFanatics CX Karikasari #2, Elva	NE	Mari-Liis Mõttus (EST)	Haanja Rattaklubi	
11 October 2025	(Estonia) BikeFanatics CX Karikasari #3, Rapla County	NE	Mari-Liis Mõttus (EST)	Haanja Rattaklubi	
18 October 2025	(Estonia) BikeFanatics CX Karikasari #4, Tallinn	NE	Mari-Liis Mõttus (EST)	Haanja Rattaklubi	
25 October 2025	(Estonia) BikeFanatics CX Karikasari #5, Rakke	NE	Mari-Liis Mõttus (EST)	Haanja Rattaklubi	

=== 2025–2026 Finnish CX Cup ===
Date	Course	Class	Winner	Team	References
20 September 2025	(Finland) Finnish CX Cup #1, Lieto	NE	Hanna Häkkinen (FIN)	Reaktor Stanga Racing	
27 September 2025	(Finland) Finnish CX Cup #2, Nurmijärvi	NE	Mette Borremans (FIN)	Korson Kaiku	
5 October 2025	(Finland) Finnish CX Cup #3, Valkeala	NE	Hanna Häkkinen (FIN)	Reaktor Stanga Racing	
18 October 2025	(Finland) Finnish CX Cup #4, Tuusula	NE	Hanna Häkkinen (FIN)	Reaktor Stanga Racing	
26 October 2025	(Finland) Finnish CX Cup #5, Olari	NE	Camilla Schröder (FIN)	Porvoon Akilles	
2 November 2025	(Finland) Finnish CX Cup #6, Helsinki	NE	Hanna Häkkinen (FIN)	Reaktor Stanga Racing	

=== 2025–2026 French Cup Series ===
Date	Course	Class	Winner	Team	References
25 October 2025	(France) 2025–2026 French Cup Series #1, Albi	C2/NE	Célia Gery (FRA)	AS Bike Racing - France Literie	
26 October 2025	(France) 2025–2026 French Cup Series #2, Albi	C2/NE	Célia Gery (FRA)	AS Bike Racing - France Literie	
15 November 2025	(France) 2025–2026 French Cup Series #3, Quelneuc	C2/NE	Amandine Muller (FRA)	AS Bike Racing - France Literie	
16 November 2025	(France) 2025–2026 French Cup Series #4, Quelneuc	C2/NE	Amandine Fouquenet (FRA)		
14 December 2025	(France) 2025–2026 French Cup Series #5, Ouistreham	C2/NE	Anaïs Morichon (FRA)		

=== 2025 German CX Bundesliga ===
Date	Course	Class	Winner	Team	References
20 September 2025	(Germany) 2025 German Bundesliga CX #1 – International Cyclo-Cross Bad Salzdetfurth #1, Bad Salzdetfurth	C2/NE	Alicia Franck (BEL)		
21 September 2025	(Germany) 2025 German Bundesliga CX #2 – International Cyclo-Cross Bad Salzdetfurth #2, Bad Salzdetfurth	C2/NE	Alicia Franck (BEL)		
4 October 2025	(Germany) 2025 German Bundesliga CX #3 – Bauhaus Perlcross #1, Perl	NE	Laura Piernet (FRA)	Roussy Bike Club	
5 October 2025	(Germany) 2025 German Bundesliga CX #4 – Bauhaus Perlcross #2, Perl	NE	Lisa Heckmann (GER)	VC Darmstadt 1899	
11 October 2025	(Germany) 2025 German Bundesliga CX #5 – GaloppCross 4.0, Bremen	NE	Kaya Musgrave (USA)	PURE Energy Drink - Haro Bikes By Corego	
12 October 2025	(Germany) 2025 German Bundesliga CX #6 – Rund um den Lohner Aussichtsturm, Löhne	NE	Kaya Musgrave (USA)	PURE Energy Drink - Haro Bikes By Corego	
19 October 2025	(Germany) 2025 German Bundesliga CX #7 – 3. Cyclo-Cross Rennen in Wörth a. d. Donau, Wörth an der Donau	NE	Stefanie Paul (GER)	STEVENS Racing Team Frauen	
26 October 2025	(Germany) 2025 German Bundesliga CX #8 – 5. Munich Super Cross, München	NE	Stefanie Paul (GER)	STEVENS Racing Team Frauen	
2 November 2025	(Germany) 2025 German Bundesliga CX #9 – Rund um die Chemnitzer Radrennbahn, Chemnitz	C2/NE	Kateřina Douděrová (CZE)		
8 November 2025	(Germany) 2025 German Bundesliga CX #10 – Vaihinger Radcross 2025, Vaihingen an der Enz	NE	Jule Märkl (GER)	Canyon–SRAM Generation	
9 November 2025	(Germany) 2025 German Bundesliga CX #11 – Magstadter Radcross, Magstadt	NE	Lisa Heckmann (GER)		
15 November 2025	(Germany) 2025 German Bundesliga CX #12 – Stahnsdorf Cross Day 1, Stahnsdorf	NE	Judith Krahl (GER)	ROSE Racing Circle women	
16 November 2025	(Germany) 2025 German Bundesliga CX #13 – Stahnsdorf Cross Day 2, Stahnsdorf	NE	Judith Krahl (GER)	ROSE Racing Circle women	
22 November 2025	(Germany) 2025 German Bundesliga CX #14 – Regional Championships	NE	(Thuringia) Dörte Martischewsky		
29 November 2025	(Germany) 2025 German Bundesliga CX #14 – Regional Championships	NE	(North Rhine-Westphalia) Kaija Budde	Peter Pane Nagel CX Team	
30 November 2025	(Germany) 2025 German Bundesliga CX #14 – Regional Championships	NE	(Berlin) Jessica Walsleben	Cycling Collective Berlin	
6 December 2025	(Germany) 2025 German Bundesliga CX #14 – Regional Championships	NE	(Saxony-Anhalt) Alexandra Latocha (Lower Saxony) Stefanie Paul	Gunsha-KMC CX/Gravel Team; STEVENS Racing Team Frauen	
7 December 2025	(Germany) 2025 German Bundesliga CX #14.1 – Regional Championships	NE	(Bremen (state)) (Hamburg) Tomke Windelband (Hesse) Lisa Heckmann (Mecklenburg-Vorpommern) (Saarland) (Brandenburg) / (Saxony) Natalie Kaufmann (Schleswig-Holstein) Cordula Biermann (Rhineland-Palatinate) Jule Märkl (Baden-Württemberg) Sunny-Angelina Geschwender		
13 December 2025	(Germany) 2025 German Bundesliga CX #15 – Königshammer Cross, Baiersbronn	NE	Tomke Windelband (GER)	STEVENS Racing Team Frauen	
14 December 2025	(Germany) 2025 German Bundesliga CX #16 – Königshammer Cross, Baiersbronn	NE	Jule Märkl (GER)	Canyon–SRAM Generation	
4 January 2026	(Germany) 2025 German Bundesliga CX #17 – , Vechta	NE	Stefanie Paul (GER)	STEVENS Racing Team Frauen	

=== 2025–2026 British National Trophy Series ===
Date	Course	Class	Winner	Team	References
5 October 2025	(United Kingdom) National Trophy Series #1 – Derby, Derby	C2/NE	Ffion Drake (GBR)		
19 October 2025	(United Kingdom) National Trophy Series #2 - Falkirk, Falkirk	C2/NE	Ffion Drake (GBR)		
2 November 2025	(United Kingdom) National Trophy Series #3 - Clanfield, Clanfield	C2/NE	Ffion Drake (GBR)		
16 November 2025	(United Kingdom) National Trophy Series #4 - West Bromwich, West Bromwich	C2/NE	Ffion Drake (GBR)		
7 December 2025	(United Kingdom) National Trophy Series #5 - Bradford, Bradford	C2/NE	Grace Inglis (GBR)		
3 January 2026	(United Kingdom) National Trophy Series #6 - Irvine, Irvine	NE	Cancelled		

=== 2025 Hungarian CX Series ===
Date	Course	Class	Winner	Team	References
12 October 2025	(Hungary) Hungarian CX Series, Kermann IT Cyclo-Cross Challenge #1, Kőbánya	NE	Lilla Zsidai (HUN)	KTM Team Hungary	
19 October 2025	(Hungary) Hungarian CX Series, Kermann IT Cyclo-Cross Challenge #2, Kiskunlacháza	NE	Lilla Zsidai (HUN)	KTM Team Hungary	
2 November 2025	(Hungary) Hungarian CX Series, DSI Cross Debrecen, Debrecen	C2/NE	Zuzanna Krzystała (POL)		
23 November 2025	(Hungary) Hungarian CX Series, NYKSE Robinson Cyclo-Cross Magyar Kupa, Nyíregyháza	NE	Boglárka Szabó (HUN)		
7 December 2025	(Hungary) Hungarian CX Series, Újbuda Cyclo-cross Magyar Kupa, Budapest	NE	Karolina Horváth (HUN)	Team United Shipping	
13 December 2025	(Hungary) Hungarian CX Series, Velopark Grand Prix UCI C1, Debrecen	C1/NE	Zuzanna Krzystała (POL)		
14 December 2025	(Hungary) Hungarian CX Series, Velopark Grand Prix UCI C2, Debrecen	C2/NE	Zuzanna Krzystała (POL)		
3 January 2026	(Hungary) Hungarian CX Series, Kermann IT Cyclo-Cross Challenge #3, Etyek	NE	Karolina Horváth (HUN)	Team United Shipping	

=== 2025 Irish National Cyclo-Cross Series ===
Date	Course	Class	Winner	Team	References
12 October 2025	(Republic of Ireland) 2025 Irish National Cyclo-Cross Series #1, Belfast	NE	Doireann Killeen (IRL)	Kilcullen Cycling Club Murphy Geospacial	
26 October 2025	(Republic of Ireland) 2025 Irish National Cyclo-Cross Series #2, Glencullen	NE	Rachel Newell (IRL)	McConvey Cycles	
30 November 2025	(Republic of Ireland) 2025 Irish National Cyclo-Cross Series #3, Limerick	NE	Rachel Newell (IRL)	McConvey Cycles	
4 January 2026	(Republic of Ireland) 2025 Irish National Cyclo-Cross Series #4, Ballinasloe	NE	Greta Lawless (IRL)		

=== 2025 Campionato Italiano Società CX ===
Date	Course	Class	Winner	Team	References
5 October 2025	(Italy) Trofeo Città Di Tarvisio Internazionale – Campionato Italiano Società CX #1, Tarvisio	C2/NE	Sara Casasola (ITA)	Crelan - Corendon	
12 October 2025	(Italy) #1 Prova Mediterraneo Cross – NE – 13° Trofeo Ciclocross Città di Viggiano – Campionato Italiano Società CX #2, Viggiano	NE	Chiara Radesca (ITA)	ASD Team Favara Bike & Sport	
19 October 2025	(Italy) Zoncross Classic Sutrio 2025 – Campionato Italiano Società CX #3, Sutrio	C2/NE	Carlotta Borello (ITA)	Team Cingolani Specialized	
1 November 2025	(Italy) Trofeo Citta' di Firenze – Campionato Italiano Società CX #4, Mugello Circuit	C2/NE	Lucia Bramati (ITA)	FAS Airport Services - Guerciotti	
8 December 2025	(Italy) 10° Trofeo Città di Belvedere Marittimo CX – Campionato Italiano Società CX #5, Belvedere Marittimo	NE	Alessia Bulleri (ITA)	Cycling Café Racing Team	
6 January 2026	(Italy) Nazionale Ciclocross – Campionato Italiano Società CX #6, Seregno	NE	Katia Moro (ITA)	Papao Racing	

=== 2025–26 JCF Cyclocross Series ===
Date	Course	Class	Winner	Team	References
5 October 2025	(Japan) Ibaraki Cyclocross Tsuchiura Stage – JCF Cyclocross Series #1, Tsuchiura	NE	Maiha Takemura (JPN)	SHIDO-WORKS	
26 October 2025	(Japan) Tohoku Cyclocross Series 2025 Watari Round – JCF Cyclocross Series #2, Watari	NE	Yui Ishida (JPN)	TRK Works	
2 November 2025	(Japan) Gotemba Cyclocross – JCF Cyclocross Series #3, Gotemba	NE	Yui Ishida (JPN)	TRK Works	
9 November 2025	(Japan) Makuhari Cross 2025 – JCF Cyclocross Series #4, Chiba	NE	Yui Ishida (JPN)	TRK Works	
23 November 2025	(Japan) Kansai Cyclocross Lake Biwa Grand Prix – JCF Cyclocross Series #5, Kusatsu	C2/NE	Kasuga Watabe (JPN)		
24 November 2025	(Japan) Tokai Cyclocross – JCF Cyclocross Series #6, Inazawa	NE	Kasuga Watabe (JPN)		
29 November 2025	(Japan) Matsubushi Cyclocross – JCF Cyclocross Series #7, Matsubushi	NE	Yui Ishida (JPN)	TRK Works	
6 December 2025	(Japan) Utsunomiya Cyclo-cross Day 1 – JCF Cyclocross Series #8, Utsunomiya	C2/NE	Yui Ishida (JPN)	TRK Works	
7 December 2025	(Japan) Utsunomiya Cyclo-cross Day 2 – JCF Cyclocross Series #9, Utsunomiya	C2/NE	Ayaka Hiyoshi (JPN)		
18 January 2025	(Japan) Zaousama Cup Tohoku Cyclocross 2026 – JCF Cyclocross Series #10, Zaō	NE	Yui Ishida (JPN)	TRK Works	
25 January 2025	(Japan) Saving Yamaguchi Cyclocross Yamaguchi Kirara Expo Memorial Park Tournament – JCF Cyclocross Series #11, Yamaguchi	NE	Saya Ando (JPN)	SHIDO-WORKS	
7–8 February 2025	(Japan) Cyclocross Tokyo – JCF Cyclocross Series #12, Tokyo	NE	Yui Ishida (JPN)	TRK Works	

=== 2025 Latvian CX Cup Series ===
Date	Course	Class	Winner	Team	References
5 October 2025	(Latvia) 2025 Latvian CX Cup Series, Valmiera CX, Valmiera	NE	Evelīna Ermane-Marčenko (LVA)	DTG-MySport	
12 October 2025	(Latvia) 2025 Latvian CX Cup Series, Dobeles velokross, Dobele	NE	Evelīna Ermane-Marčenko (LVA)	DTG-MySport	
18 October 2025	(Latvia) 2025 Latvian CX Cup Series, Veloaplis 2025, Smiltene	NE	No Elite		
26 October 2025	(Latvia) 2025 Latvian CX Cup Series, Kuldīgas NSS Atklātās meistarsacīkstes krosā, Kuldīga	NE	Dace Almane (LVA)		

=== 2025 Lithuanian CX Cup Series ===
Date	Course	Class	Winner	Team	References
7 September 2025	(Lithuania) 2025 Lithuanian CX Cup Series, Vingis Park, Vilnius	NE	Irmantė Aleliūnaitė (LTU)	Bernatonio dviračių akademija Vilnius	
28 September 2025	(Lithuania) 2025 Lithuanian CX Cup Series, Kėdainiai	NE	Gabija Jonaitytė (LTU)	Fortūna DK Panevėžys	
19 October 2025	(Lithuania) 2025 Lithuanian CX Cup Series, Velocx International CX Race Vilnius, Smiltene	C2/NE	Antonina Kucharska (POL)	KS Klif Chłapowo Chłapowo	
26 October 2025	(Lithuania) 2025 Lithuanian CX Cup Series, Utena	NE	Tatjana Petrauskienė (LTU)	Energus talentų akademija Vilnius	

=== 2025–2026 ŠKODA Cross Cup ===
Date	Course	Class	Winner	Team	References
12 October 2025	(Luxembourg) 2025–2026 ŠKODA Cross Cup #1 – Festival du Cyclo-Cross "Memorial Claude Michely" / CT Kayldall, Kayl	NE	June Nothum (LUX)	UC Dippach	
18 October 2025	(Luxembourg) 2025–2026 ŠKODA Cross Cup #2 – Urban Nightcross "Memorial Claude Michely" / CT Kayldall, Reckange-sur-Mess	NE	June Nothum (LUX)	UC Dippach	
19 October 2025	(Luxembourg) 2025–2026 ŠKODA Cross Cup #3 – Cyclo Cross régional / UC Munnerëfer Velosfrënn, Mondorf-les-Bains	NE	Laura Piernet (FRA)	VC Communautaire Hettange	
26 October 2025	(Luxembourg) 2025–2026 ŠKODA Cross Cup #4 – Grand Prix de la Commune de Contern, Contern	C2/NE	Larissa Hartog (NED)		
22 November 2025	(Luxembourg) 2025–2026 ŠKODA Cross Cup #5 – Championnat du Monde Militaire de Cyclo-Cross / Team Toproad, Diekirch	NE	Amy Breuer (LUX)		
23 November 2025	(Luxembourg) 2025–2026 ŠKODA Cross Cup #6 – Festival de Cyclo-Cross, Cessange	NE	Vita Movrin (SVN)		
30 November 2025	(Luxembourg) 2025–2026 ŠKODA Cross Cup #7 – Cyclocross Schëffleng, Schifflange	NE	June Nothum (LUX)	UC Dippach	
7 December 2025	(Luxembourg) 2025–2026 ŠKODA Cross Cup #8 – GP Commune de Préizerdaul, Préizerdaul	NE	Laura Piernet (FRA)	VC Communautaire Hettange	
14 December 2025	(Luxembourg) 2025–2026 ŠKODA Cross Cup #9 – Cyclo Cross UCN Ettelbruck, Ettelbruck	NE	June Nothum (LUX)	UC Dippach	
26 December 2025	(Luxembourg) 2025–2026 ŠKODA Cross Cup #10 – , Differdange	NE	June Nothum (LUX)	UC Dippach	
4 January 2026	(Luxembourg) 2025–2026 ŠKODA Cross Cup #11 – , Alzingen	NE	Nina Berton (LUX)	EF Education–Oatly	

=== 2025–2026 Netherlands CX Series ===
Date	Course	Class	Winner	Team	References
14 September 2025	2025 Netherlands CX Series, Kleeberg Cross, Mechelen	C2/NE	Alicia Franck (BEL)		
14 September 2025	2025 Netherlands CX Series, Juniors, Kleeberg Cross, Mechelen	C2/NE	Nynke Jochems (NED)		
12 October 2025	2025 Netherlands CX Series, NL Cup: Nationale & Jeugdveldrit Norg, Norg	NE	Anniek Mos (NED)	KDM-pack Women Cycling Team	
12 October 2025	2025 Netherlands CX Series, NL Cup: Nationale & Jeugdveldrit Norg - Junioren, Norg	NE	Britt Beumer (NED)		
18 October 2025	2025 Netherlands CX Series, NL Cup: Helmcross, Helmond	NE	Emma Brouwer (NED)	UWTC de Volharding	
18 October 2025	2025 Netherlands CX Series, NL Cup: Helmcross, Juniors Helmond	NE	Lotte Bouman (NED)	W.V. Eemland	
19 October 2025	(Netherlands) GP Oisterwijk, Oisterwijk	C2	Cancelled		
19 October 2025	2025 Netherlands CX Series, Nationale Veldrit Almelo 15+, Almelo	NE	Britt Beumer (NED)	Wielersportvereniging ETP Zutphen	
21 October 2025	2025 Netherlands CX Series, Kiremko Nacht van Woerden, Woerden	C2/NE	Fem van Empel (NED)	Visma–Lease a Bike	
25 October 2025	2025 Netherlands CX Series, Exact Cross Heerderstrand, Heerde	C2/NE	Fem van Empel (NED)	Visma–Lease a Bike	
1 November 2025	2025 Netherlands CX Series, NL Cup: 11e Nationale Veldrit van Rhenen, Rhenen	NE	Bibi Verzijl (NED)	WTOS Delft	
1 November 2025	2025 Netherlands CX Series, NL Cup: 11e Nationale Veldrit van Rhenen, Juniors, Rhenen	NE	Maxime Takken (NED)	CC Pavé 76	
9 November 2025	2025 Netherlands CX Series, Nationale Jeugdveldrit van De Westereen, Juniors, De Westereen	NE	Elske van der Veen (NED)	WV Otto Ebbens	
15 November 2025	2025 Netherlands CX Series, NL Cup: PRC Delta Crossweekend - dag 1, Juniors, Spijkenisse	NE	Jill Schmitz (NED)	TWC Het Snelle Wiel	
16 November 2025	(Netherlands) UCI Col du VAM cross, Wijster	C2/NE	Cancelled		
16 November 2025	(Netherlands) UCI Col du VAM cross, Juniors, Wijster	C2/NE	Cancelled		
22 November 2025	2025 Netherlands CX Series, NL Cup: Janet Memorial Veldrit van Hilversum, Laren	NE	Ilse Pluimers (NED)	AWV de Zwaluwen	
22 November 2025	2025 Netherlands CX Series, NL Cup: Janet Memorial Veldrit van Hilversum, Juniors, Laren	NE	Lonneke Heesemans (NED)	TWC Het Snelle Wiel	
30 November 2025	2025 Netherlands CX Series, NL Cup: De bultcross Leiden - dag 2, Leiden	NE	Julia van der Meulen (NED)	AWV de Zwaluwen	
30 November 2025	2025 Netherlands CX Series, NL Cup: De bultcross Leiden - dag 2, Juniors, Leiden	NE	Jill Schmitz (NED)	TWC Het Snelle Wiel	
6 December 2025	2025 Netherlands CX Series, NL Cup: 44e Nationale Veldrit van Amersfoort, Amersfoort	NE	Anniek Mos (NED)	KDM-pack Women Cycling Team	
6 December 2025	2025 Netherlands CX Series, NL Cup: 44e Nationale Veldrit van Amersfoort, Juniors, Amersfoort	NE	Lonneke Heesemans (NED)	TWC Het Snelle Wiel	
7 December 2025	2025 Netherlands CX Series, Nationaal veldrit Nijverdal, Nijverdal	NE	Ilse Pluimers (NED)	AWV de Zwaluwen	
21 December 2025	2025 Netherlands CX Series, NL Cup: APW Auto's Veldrit van Reusel, Reusel	NE	Jamie de Beer Bierens (NED)	TWC Het Snelle Wiel	
4 January 2026	2025 Netherlands CX Series, NL Cup: 21e Kasteelcross Vorden, Vorden	NE	Anniek Mos (NED)	KDM-pack Women Cycling Team	
4 January 2026	2025 Netherlands CX Series, NL Cup: 21e Kasteelcross Vorden, Juniors, Vorden	NE	Lonneke Heesemans (NED)	TWC Het Snelle Wiel	
17 January 2026	2025 Netherlands CX Series, SPECIALIZED Veldrit Arnhems-Buiten, Arnhem	NE	Cancelled		
25 January 2026	(Netherlands) Bommelcross, Zaltbommel	NE	Cancelled		

=== 2025 Norway CX Cup Series ===
Date	Course	Class	Winner	Team	References
11 October 2025	Norway CX Cup Series, Føyka Kross Day 1, Asker	NE	Mie Bjørndal Ottestad (NOR)	Ullevål SK	
12 October 2025	Norway CX Cup Series, Føyka Kross Day 2, Asker	NE	Karoline Flaterud (NOR)	Asker SK	
18 October 2025	Norway CX Cup Series, Oslo	NE	Thea Siggerud (NOR)	Soon CK	
19 October 2025	Norway CX Cup Series, Vargcross, Oslo	NE	Åshild Tovsrud (NOR)	Asker SK	
25 October 2025	Norway CX Cup Series, Hoxmark Cross, Ås	NE	Oda Laforce (NOR)	Ringerike SK	
26 October 2025	Norway CX Cup Series, Hoxmark Cross, Ås	NE	Thea Siggerud (NOR)	Soon CK	
1 November 2025	Norway CX Cup Series, Skien	NE	Tiril Frostestad-Stenbrenden (NOR)	SK Rye Sykkel	
8 November 2025	Norway CX Cup Series, Hoxmark Cross, Spikkestad	NE	Cancelled		

=== 2025–26 Polish CX Cup Series ===
Date	Course	Class	Winner	Team	References
18 October 2025	(Poland) 2025–26 Polish CX Cup I, Kluczewsko	NE	Malwina Mul (POL)	MAT Atom Deweloper Wrocław	
19 October 2025	(Poland) 2025–26 Polish CX Cup II, Kluczbork	NE	Malwina Mul (POL)	MAT Atom Deweloper Wrocław	
8 November 2025	(Poland) 2025–26 Polish CX Cup III, Piaseczno	NE	Zuzanna Krzystała (POL)	Pho3nix Cycling Team	
11 November 2025	(Poland) 2025–26 Polish CX Cup IV, Koziegłowy	NE	Zuzanna Krzystała (POL)	Pho3nix Cycling Team	
22 November 2025	(Poland) 2025–26 Polish CX Cup V, Koźminek	NE	Adrianna Polus (POL)		
23 November 2025	(Poland) 2025–26 Polish CX Cup VI, Środa Wielkopolska	NE	Adrianna Polus (POL)		
29 November 2025	(Poland) 2025–26 Polish CX Cup VII, Gościęcin	NE	Zuzanna Krzystała (POL)	Pho3nix Cycling Team	
30 November 2025	(Poland) 2025–26 Polish CX Cup VIII, Gościęcin	NE	Zuzanna Krzystała (POL)	Pho3nix Cycling Team	
6 December 2025	(Poland) 2025–26 Polish CX Cup IX, Włoszakowice	NE	Sofia Ungerová (SVK)	MAT Atom Deweloper Wrocław	
14 December 2025	(Poland) 2025–26 Polish CX Cup X, Koźminek	NE	Adrianna Polus (POL)		
20 December 2025	(Poland) 2025–26 Polish CX Cup XI, Sławno	NE	Kinga Żur (POL)	DK Gwarki	
21 December 2025	(Poland) 2025–26 Polish CX Cup XII, Włoszczowa	NE	—N/a	—N/a	
28 December 2025	(Poland) 2025–26 Polish CX Cup XIII, Ełk	NE	Antonina Białek (POL)	Warszawski Klub Kolarski	
4 January 2026	(Poland) 2025–26 Polish CX Cup XIV, Trzcianka	NE	Adrianna Polus (POL)		

=== 2025 Portuguese CX Cup Series ===
Date	Course	Class	Winner	Team	References
18 October 2025	2025 Portuguese CX Cup Series, Ciclocrosse de Melgaço, Portugal	C1/NE	Lucía González Blanco (ESP)	Nesta - MMR CX Team	
19 October 2025	(Portugal) 2025 Portuguese CX Cup Series, Ciclocrosse Internacional de Vouzela, Vouzela	C2/NE	Lucía González Blanco (ESP)	Nesta - MMR CX Team	
26 October 2025	(Portugal) 2025 Portuguese CX Cup Series, Ciclocross Cidade Vila Real, Vila Real	C2/NE	Sara Cueto (ESP)	Unicaja - Gijon	
15 November 2025	(Portugal) 2025 Portuguese CX Cup Series, Abrantes	NE	Tânia Lima (POR)	SAERTEX Portugal / CRIAZinvent	
16 November 2025	(Portugal) 2025 Portuguese CX Cup Series, Ansião	NE	Tânia Lima (POR)	SAERTEX Portugal / CRIAZinvent	
7 December 2025	(Portugal) 2025 Portuguese CX Cup Series, Vila Boa de Quires	NE	Ana Santos (POR)	Cannondale Factory Racing	

=== 2025 Romanian CX Cup Series ===
Date	Course	Class	Winner	Team	References
19 October 2025	(Romania) 2025 Romanian CX Cup Series, Velocrosul Castanilor, Florești	NE	Miruna Măda (ROU)	CSM Unirea Alba Iulia	
15 November 2025	(Romania) 2025 Romanian CX Cup Series, Lunca Timișului CX, Moșnița Nouă	C2/NE	Lara Defour (BEL)	Cycling Team Jade - LDL	
16 November 2025	(Romania) 2025 Romanian CX Cup Series, Arad CX Cup, Arad	NE	Miruna Măda (ROU)	CSM Unirea Alba Iulia-Biciclim	
6 December 2025	(Romania) 2025 Romanian CX Cup Series, Cluj Winter Race, Cluj Napoca	NE	Miruna Măda (ROU)	CSM Unirea Alba Iulia-Biciclim	

=== 2025–26 Russian CX Series ===
Date	Course	Class	Winner	Team	References
5 September 2025	(Russia) 2025–26 Russian CX Series, Urmary	NE	Liliya Bulatova (RUS)		
7 September 2025	(Russia) 2025–26 Russian CX Series, Urmary	NE	Liliya Bulatova (RUS)		
11 October 2025	(Russia) 2025–26 Russian CX Series, Kopeysk	NE	Daria Tislenko (RUS)		
19 October 2025	(Russia) 2025–26 Russian CX Series, Yekaterinburg	NE	Anastasia Kalyalina (RUS)		
26 October 2025	(Russia) 2025–26 Russian CX Series, Izhevsk	NE	Alina Karlova (RUS)		

=== 2025–26 Cycling Serbian Cup ===
Date	Course	Class	Winner	Team	References
7 December 2025	(Serbia) 2025–26 Cycling Serbian Cup #1 – Ciklo Kros Jednota, Šid	NE	Bojana Jovanović (SRB)		
21 December 2025	(Serbia) 2025–26 Cycling Serbian Cup #2 – Ciklo Kros Šid, Šid	NE	Bojana Jovanović (SRB)		
4 January 2026	(Serbia) 2025–26 Cycling Serbian Cup #3, ?	NE			

=== 2025 Slovak CX Cup Series ===
Date	Course	Class	Winner	Team	References
5 October 2025	(Slovakia) 2025 Slovak CX Cup Series #1, Grand Prix Topoľčianky, Topoľčianky	C2/NE	Kristýna Zemanová (CZE)	VIF Cycling Team	
12 October 2025	(Slovakia) 2025 Slovak CX Cup Series, Grand Prix Selce, Selce	C2/NE	Antonina Białek (POL)	Warszawski Klub Kolarski	
19 October 2025	(Slovakia) 2025 Slovak CX Cup Series, Grand Prix Levoča, Levoča	C2/NE	Antonina Białek (POL)	Warszawski Klub Kolarski	
26 October 2025	(Slovakia) 2025 Slovak CX Cup Series, Grand Prix Podbrezová, Podbrezová	C2/NE	Eliška Drbohlavová (CZE)	LAWI Junior team	
23 November 2025	(Slovakia) 2025 Slovak CX Cup Series, Grand Prix Dohňany, Dohňany	NE	Dorota Vojtíšková (SVK)	Climberg Sport Team	

=== 2025 Slovenian CX Cup Series ===
Date	Course	Class	Winner	Team	References
16 November 2025	(Slovenia) 2025 Slovenian CX Cup Series, 2. Ciklokros Polzela, Polzela	NE	Maša Žalig (SVN)	KK Tropovci	
30 November 2025	(Slovenia) 2025 Slovenian CX Cup Series, 4. Ciklokros Straža, Straža	NE	Nika Bojanc (SVN)	KD Sprint	
7 December 2025	(Slovenia) 2025 Slovenian CX Cup Series, 3. CX za Pokal Občine Tišina, Tropovci	NE	Nika Bojanc (SVN)	KD Sprint	
14 December 2025	(Slovenia) 2025 Slovenian CX Cup Series, CX Murska Sobota – DP, Murska Sobota	NE	Manca Radman (SVN)	BK Živinice	
26 December 2025	(Slovenia) 2025 Slovenian CX Cup Series, 5. Ciklokros Ljubljana, Ljubljana	NE	Emilie Patru (SVN)	Pika Team by Mastercard	

=== 2025 Copa de España de Ciclocross ===
Date	Course	Class	Winner	Team	References
5 October 2025	(Spain) 2025 Copa de España de Ciclocross #1, Trofeo Villa de Gijón, Gijón	C2/NE	Lucía González Blanco (ESP)	Nesta - MMR CX Team	
12 October 2025	(Spain) 2025 Copa de España de Ciclocross #2, Ciclocross Internacional Xaxancx 2025, Marín	C2/NE	Lucía González Blanco (ESP)	Nesta - MMR CX Team	
1 November 2025	(Spain) 2025 Copa de España de Ciclocross #3, Amurrioko Ziklokrossa, Amurrio	C2/NE	Lucía González Blanco (ESP)	Nesta - MMR CX Team	
2 November 2025	(Spain) 2025 Copa de España de Ciclocross #4, Ciclocross Internacional de Karrantza, Karrantza	C2/NE	Sofia Rodríguez (ESP)	Nesta - MMR CX Team	
16 November 2025	(Spain) 2025 Copa de España de Ciclocross #5, Alcobendas Ciudad Europea del Deporte, Alcobendas	C2/NE	Lucía González Blanco (ESP)	Nesta - MMR CX Team	
23 November 2025	(Spain) 2025 Copa de España de Ciclocross #6, Gran Premi Ciclocròs Ciutat de Vic, Vic	C2/NE	Sofia Rodríguez (ESP)	Nesta - MMR CX Team	
6 December 2025	(Spain) 2025 Copa de España de Ciclocross #7, Ciclocross Internacional Ciutat de Xàtiva, Xàtiva	C2/NE	Larissa Hartog (NED)		
7 December 2025	(Spain) 2025 Copa de España de Ciclocross #8 - Trofeo Ciclo-Cross Rafa Valls, Cocentaina	C2/NE	Larissa Hartog (NED)		

=== 2025–2026 Swedish CX Cup Series ===
Date	Course	Class	Winner	Team	References
11 October 2025	(Sweden) Swedish CX Cup Series #1, Fristads CX Täby Day 1, Täby	C2/NE	Alicia Franck (BEL)		
12 October 2025	(Sweden) Swedish CX Cup Series #2, Fristads CX Täby Day 2, Täby	C2/NE	Alicia Franck (BEL)		
18 October 2025	(Sweden) Swedish CX Cup Series #3, Varberg Cyclocross Day 1, Varberg	C2/NE	Adèle Hurteloup (FRA)	Velopro - EGS Group - Alphamotorhomes	
19 October 2025	(Sweden) Swedish CX Cup Series #4, Varberg Cyclocross Day 2, Varberg	C2/NE	Xan Crees (GBR)		
15 November 2025	(Sweden) Swedish CX Cup Series #5, Malmö	NE	Thea Persson (SWE)	Kvänums IF	
16 November 2025	(Sweden) Swedish CX Cup Series #6, Malmö	NE	Thea Persson (SWE)	Kvänums IF	

=== 2025–2026 Swiss CX Cup Series ===
Date	Course	Class	Winner	Team	References
12 October 2025	(Switzerland) 64. Internationales Radquer Steinmaur / Swiss Cyclocross Cup #1, Steinmaur	C2/NE	Julie Brouwers (BEL)	Charles Liégeois Roastery CX	
19 October 2025	(Switzerland) AlperoseQuer Schneisingen / Swiss Cyclocross Cup #2, Schneisingen	C2/NE	Célia Gery (FRA)	AS Bike Racing - France Literie	
26 October 2025	(Switzerland) 10. Radquer Mettmenstetten / Swiss Cyclocross Cup #3, Mettmenstetten	C2/NE	Line Burquier (FRA)		
16 November 2025	(Switzerland) Eagle Cross / Swiss Cyclo Cross Cup #4, Aigle	C2/NE	Rebecca Gariboldi (ITA)	Ale Colnago Team	
7 December 2025	(Switzerland) Int. Radquer Hittnau / Swiss Cyclocross Cup #5, Hittnau	C2/NE	Rebekka Estermann (SUI)		

=== 2025 TREK USCX Cyclocross Series ===
Date	Course	Class	Winner	Team	References
13 September 2025	(United States) 2025 TREK USCX Cyclocross Series – Virginia’s Blue Ridge Go Cross Day 1, Roanoke	C1/NE	Maghalie Rochette (CAN)		
14 September 2025	(United States) 2025 TREK USCX Cyclocross Series – Virginia’s Blue Ridge Go Cross Day 2, Roanoke	C2/NE	Maghalie Rochette (CAN)		
20 September 2025	(United States) 2025 TREK USCX Cyclocross Series – Rochester Cyclocross Day 1, Rochester	C1/NE	Manon Bakker (NED)	Crelan - Corendon	
21 September 2025	(United States) 2025 TREK USCX Cyclocross Series – Rochester Cyclocross Day 2, Rochester	C2/NE	Maghalie Rochette (CAN)		
27 September 2025	(United States) 2025 TREK USCX Cyclocross Series – Charm City Cross Day 1, Baltimore	C1/NE	Maghalie Rochette (CAN)		
28 September 2025	(United States) 2025 TREK USCX Cyclocross Series – Charm City Cross Day 2, Baltimore	C2/NE	Maghalie Rochette (CAN)		
4 October 2025	(United States) 2025 TREK USCX Cyclocross Series – Trek CX Cup Day 1, Waterloo	C1/NE	Maghalie Rochette (CAN)		
5 October 2025	(United States) 2025 TREK USCX Cyclocross Series – Trek CX Cup Day 2, Waterloo	C2/NE	Maghalie Rochette (CAN)		

== Rankings Women's Elite ==
=== Australia ===
Full women's elite standings
Rank	Rider	VIC (Victoria (state))	VIC (Victoria (state))	NSW (New South Wales)	NSW (New South Wales)	SA (South Australia)	SA (South Australia)	VIC (Victoria (state))	Total Points
1	(Australia) Isabella Flint	80 (1)	1 (DNF)	80 (1)	80 (1)	65 (2)	80 (1)		386
2	(Australia) Miranda Griffiths	65 (2)	80 (1)	65 (2)	65 (2)			65 (2)	340
3	(Australia) Alanna Van De Hoef	38 (6)	48 (4)			38 (6)	38 (6)	65 (2)	227
4	(Australia) Madeleine Wasserbaech	48 (4)	65 (2)			48 (4)	55 (3)		216
5	(Australia) Erin Mitchell	43 (5)	55 (3)			43 (5)	43 (5)		184
6	(Australia) Sophie Sutton					80 (1)	65 (2)		145
7	(Australia) Ruby Taylor	55 (3)						80 (1)	135
8	(Australia) Quinn Rothenbuehler	33 (7)	43 (5)					55 (3)	131
9	(Australia) Talia Simpson				55 (3)	48 (4)			103
10	(Australia) Peta Mullens							80 (1)	80
T11	(Australia) Lillee Pollock			55 (3)					55
T11	(Australia) Zoe Davison							55 (3)	55
13	(Australia) Mikayla Smith							48 (4)	48
14	(Australia) Laura Tomlinson							43 (5)	43
15	(Australia) Sophie Byrne							38 (6)	38
16	(Australia) Anook Simpson					33 (7)	(7)		33

==== Belgium ====
Full women's elite standings
Rank	Rider	BEL (Belgium)	BEL (Belgium)	BEL (Belgium)	Total Points
1	(Belgium) Liene Meeusen	38 (2)	38 (2)	36 (3)	112
2	(Belgium) Eva Vermeersch	30 (6)	34 (4)	26 (8)	90
3	(Belgium) Kim Van De Steene	40 (1)		40 (1)	80
4	(Belgium) Meg de Bruyne	24 (9)	32 (5)	21 (11)	77
5	(Belgium) Emily De Cuyper	21 (11)	28 (5)	28 (7)	77
6	(Belgium) Jana Van Der Veken	28 (7)	24 (9)	24 (9)	76
7	(Belgium) Alana Polfliet	22 (10)	22 (10)	32 (5)	76
8	(Belgium) Elise Vander Sande	34 (4)	40 (1)		74
9	(Belgium) Tine Rombouts	26 (8)	30 (6)	18 (13)	74
10	(Belgium) Laure Huybrechts		36 (3)	30 (6)	66
11	(Belgium) Juline Delcommune	32 (5)		34 (4)	66
12	(Belgium) Kathleen De Doncker	18 (14)	21 (11)	19 (12)	58
13	(Netherlands) Lisette Schoon	17 (15)	20 (12)	15 (16)	52
14	(Netherlands) Judith Alleleijn	20 (12)		22 (10)	42
15	(Netherlands) Selena Bas			38 (2)	36
16	(Belgium) Joyce Vanderbeken	36 (3)			36
17	(Belgium) Elena Debaele	19 (13)		16 (15)	35
18	(Belgium) Britt Kooremans		26 (8)		26
19	(Belgium) Lara Defour			20 (12)	20
20	(France) Yulizh Menant		19 (13)		19
21	(Belgium) Joyce de Loof			17 (14)	17

==== Netherlands ====
Full women's elite standings
Rank	Rider	NED (Netherlands)	Total Points
1	(Belgium) Alicia Franck	30 (1)	30
2	(Belgium) Kiona Crabbé	29 (2)	29
3	(Netherlands) Lauren Molengraaf	28 (3)	28
4	(Belgium) Julie Brouwers	27 (4)	27
5	(Netherlands) Anniek Mos	26 (5)	26
6	(Luxembourg) Maïté Barthels	25 (6)	25
7	(Belgium) Nette Coppens	24 (7)	24
8	(Netherlands) Sara Sonnemans	23 (8)	23
9	(France) Adèle Hurteloup	22 (9)	22
10	(Netherlands) Selena Bas	21 (10)	21
11	(Belgium) Juline Delcommune	20 (11)	20
12	(Belgium) Shanaya Esther Schollaert	19 (12)	19
13	(Belgium) Lies Schevenels	18 (13)	18
14	(Netherlands) Jasmijn Bloemheuvel	17 (14)	17
15	(Belgium) Lara Defour	16 (15)	16
16	(Belgium) Alexe De Raedemaeker	15 (16)	15
17	(Netherlands) Nynke Moen	14 (17)	14
18	(Netherlands) Rivkah Kroesbergen	13 (18)	13
19	(Germany) Katharina Garus	12 (19)	12
20	(Germany) Friederike Michels	11 (20)	11
21	(Netherlands) Judith Alleleijn	10 (21)	10
22	(Germany) Mali Stier	9 (22)	9
23	(Belgium) Elena Debaele	8 (23)	8
24	(Netherlands) Naomy Mulder	7 (24)	7

=== 2025 Spanish CX Cup ===
Full Women's elite standings
Rank	Rider	Asturias	Total Points
1	(Spain) Lucía González Blanco	25 (1)	25
2	(Spain) Sofia Rodríguez	20 (2)	20
3	(Spain) Alicia González Blanco	16 (3)	16
4	(Spain) Sara Cueto	14 (4)	14
5	(Spain) Nahia Arana	12 (5)	12
6	(Spain) Maier Olano	10 (6)	10
7	(Spain) Nahia García	9 (7)	9
8	(Spain) María Filgueiras	8 (8)	8
9	(Spain) Marta Beti Pérez	7 (9)	7
10	(Spain) Ana Burgos	6 (10)	6
11	(Spain) Andrea Velasco García	5 (11)	5
12	(Spain) Nahia de Miguel	4 (12)	4
13	(Spain) Adriana Alguacil	3 (13)	3
14	(Spain) Carla Jiménez Vera-y-Frías	2 (14)	2
15	(Spain) Luna Carrio	1 (15)	1

== Continental Championships (CC) ==
Country	Date	Elite	U23	Juniors
UEC European Cyclo-cross Championships	8–9 November 2025	Men's: (gold) : (Belgium) Toon Aerts; (silver) : (Belgium) Thibau Nys; (bronze) : (Belgium) Joran Wyseure; Women's: (gold) : (Netherlands) Inge van der Heijden; (silver) : (Netherlands) Lucinda Brand; (bronze) : (Netherlands) Aniek van Alphen	Men's: (gold) : (Italy) Mattia Agostinacchio; (silver) : (Netherlands) David Haverdings; (bronze) : (Belgium) Kay De Bruyckere; Women's: (gold) : (Netherlands) Leonie Bentveld; (silver) : (France) Célia Gery; (bronze) : (France) Amandine Muller	Men's: (gold) : (Italy) Filippo Grigolini; (silver) : (Italy) Patrik Pezzo Rosola; (bronze) : (Belgium) Giel Lejeune; Women's: (gold) : (Czech Republic) Barbora Bukovská; (silver) : (Netherlands) Nynke Jochems; (bronze) : (Italy) Nicole Azzetti
Pan American Cyclo-cross Championships	8 November 2025	Men's: (gold) : (United States) Andrew Strohmeyer; (silver) : (United States) Eric Brunner; (bronze) : (United States) Jules van Kempen; Women's: (gold) : (United States) Lizzy Gunsalus; (silver) : (Canada) Maghalie Rochette; (bronze) : (Canada) Sidney McGill	Men's: (gold) : (United States) Henry Coote; (silver) : (United States) Marcis Shelton; (bronze) : (United States) Ryan Drummond; Women's: (gold) : (United States) Mia Aseltine; (silver) : (United States) Alyssa Sarkisov; (bronze) : (United States) Lidia Cusack	Men's: (gold) : (United States) Noah Scholnick; (silver) : (United States) Ethan Brown; (bronze) : (United States) Jacob Hines; Women's: (gold) : (United States) Aida Linton; (silver) : (Canada) Alexa Haviland; (bronze) : (United States) Ada Watson

== World Championships (WC) ==
Country	Date	Elite	U23	Juniors	Mixed
UCI Cyclo-cross World Championships	30 January – 1 February	Men's: (gold) : (Netherlands) Mathieu van der Poel; (silver) : (Netherlands) Tibor Del Grosso; (bronze) : (Belgium) Thibau Nys; Women's: (gold) : (Netherlands) Lucinda Brand; (silver) : (Netherlands) Ceylin del Carmen Alvarado; (bronze) : (Netherlands) Puck Pieterse	Men's: (gold) : (Belgium) Aaron Dockx; (silver) : (France) Aubin Sparfel; (bronze) : (Netherlands) Keije Solen; Women's: (gold) : (Netherlands) Leonie Bentveld; (silver) : (Slovakia) Viktória Chladoňová; (bronze) : (France) Célia Gery	Men's: (gold) : (Netherlands) Delano Heren; (silver) : (Italy) Filippo Grigolini; (bronze) : (Belgium) Giel Lejeune; Women's: (gold) : (Czech Republic) Barbora Bukovská; (silver) : (France) Lise Revol; (bronze) : (Czech Republic) Lucie Grohová	(gold) : Netherlands (NED); Guus van den Eijnden; Delano Heeren; Isis Versluis; Leonie Bentveld; Shirin van Anrooij; Tibor Del Grosso; (silver) : Italy (ITA); Filippo Grigolini; Stefano Viezzi; Sara Casasola; Elisa Ferri; Giorgia Pellizotti; Filippo Fontana; (bronze) : Belgium (BEL); Fleur Moors; Kay De Bruyckere; Julie Brouwers; Jari Van Lee; Zita Peeters; Niels Vandeputte

== National Championships (NC) ==
Country	Date	Elite	U23	Juniors
Albania	10 January 2026	Olsian Veliaj; Nelia Kabetaj	—N/a	Markelian Bedulla
Australia	16 August 2025	Tasman Nankervis; Peta Mullens	Campbell McConnell; Ruby Taylor	Oliver Grande; Alana Fletcher
Austria	11 January 2026	Dominik Hödlmoser; Nadja Heigl	—N/a	Michael Hettegger
Belgium	10–11 January 2026	Thibau Nys; Marion Norbert-Riberolle	Viktor Vandenberghe	Jari Van Lee; Liese Geuens
Canada	15 November 2025	Tyler Clark; Maghalie Rochette	Mika Comaniuk; Rafaëlle Carrier	Émilien Belzile; Éliane Blais
Chile	7 September 2025	Patricio Farías; Fernanda Castro	Benjamín Cornejo	—N/a
Croatia	18 January 2026	Fran Bošnjak; Roza Šporčić	—N/a	Leon Gabriel Kišiček; Iva Iličić
Czech Republic	11 January 2026	Kryštof Bažant; Kristýna Zemanová	—N/a	Antonín John; Barbora Bukovská
Denmark	11 January 2026	Daniel Weis Nielsen; Ann-Dorthe Lisbygd	—N/a	Johannes Braedstrup-Holm; Mathilde Leegaard
Estonia	2 November 2025	Markus Pajur; Mari-Liis Mõttus	—N/a	Sebastian Suppi; Loore Lemloch
Finland	25 October 2025	Miko Pirinen; Hanna Häkkinen	—N/a	Niko Terho; Olivia Kajasoja
France	10–11 January 2026	Joris Delbove; Célia Gery	Romain Debord	Soren Bruyère Joumard; Lise Revol
Germany	10–11 January 2026	Marcel Meisen; Judith Krahl	Eike Behrens; Jule Märkl	Niclas Look; Klara Dworatzek
United Kingdom	11 January 2026	Cameron Mason; Anna Flynn	—N/a	Jacob Steed; Peggy Knox
Hungary	11 January 2026	Zsombor Tamás Takács; Regina Bruchner	—N/a	Benedek Berencsi; Janka Urbán
Ireland	11 January 2026	Dean Harvey; Freya Whiteside	—N/a	Fionn Killeen; Ffion Dolan
Iceland	18 October 2025	Davíð Jónsson; Björg Hákonardóttir	—N/a	Sólon Kári Sölvason; Eyrún Birna Bragadóttir
Italy	11 January 2026	Filippo Fontana; Sara Casasola	Stefano Viezzi; Elisa Ferri	Patrik Pezzo Rosola; Nicole Azzetti
Japan	14 December 2025	Hijiri Oda; Yui Ishida	Zenshin Nozaki	Shogo Mikami; Aoi Kobayashi
Latvia	1 November 2025	Matīss Kaļveršs; Evelīna Ermane-Marčenko	—N/a	Ričards Hansons; Laura Klismete
Lithuania	2 November 2025	Rokas Kmieliauskas; Gabija Jonaitytė	Aironas Gerdauskas	Jokūbas Dabušinskas; Irmante Aleliunaite
Luxembourg	11 January 2026	Loïc Bettendorff; Marie Schreiber	Mil Morang; Layla Barthels	Ben Fleming; June Nothum
Netherlands	10–11 January 2026	Tibor Del Grosso; Ceylin del Carmen Alvarado	—N/a	Noël Goijert; Isis Versluis
New Zealand	31 August 2025	Jacob Turner; Sharlotte Lucas	—N/a	Liam Brown; Sophie Hiswin
Norway	2 November 2025	Kevin Andre Sandli Messel; Oda Laforce	—N/a	Sindre Orholm-Lønseth; Ida Østbye Støvern
Poland	11 January 2026	Filip Helta; Zuzanna Krzystała	—N/a	Kacper Mizuro; Antonina Kucharska
Portugal	11 January 2026	Rafael Sousa; Beatriz Guerra	Tomás Gaspar; Margarida Vasconcelos	João Vigário; Rita Fontinhas
Romania	11 January 2026	Patrick Pescaru; Wendy Bunea	—N/a	Mihai-Bogdan Brînză; Flavia Bunea
Russia	12 October 2025	Pavel Balabanov; Daria Tislenko	—N/a	Aleksandr Vlasov; Marina Zorina
Serbia	11 January 2026	Igor Davidov; Bojana Jovanović	—N/a	Joakim Klačar; Helena Petrušić
Slovakia	30 November 2025	Matej Ulík; Viktória Chladoňová	—N/a	Michal Šichta; Lujza Bartošíková
Spain	10–11 January 2026	Felipe Orts; Sofia Rodríguez	Raul Mira	Benjamín Noval; Mirari Gotxi Olartekoetxea
Switzerland	11 January 2026	Kevin Kuhn; Alessandra Keller	Nicolas Halter; Jana Glaus	Levin Näf; Shana Huber
Sweden	11 January 2026	David Risberg; Thea Persson	—N/a	Melvin Pålsson Gustafsson; Elsa Elf Boberg
United States	13–14 December 2025	Eric Brunner; Lizzy Gunsalus	Henry Coote; Makena Kellerman	Ethan Brown; Kira Mullins
