= Tongeren-Borgloon =

Municipality in Limburg, Belgium

Location

Tongeren-Borgloon is a municipality located in the Belgian province of Limburg.

Tongeren-Borgloon is the result of the merger of Tongeren and Borgloon on January 1, 2025.
