= Lizzy Gunsalus =

American cyclist (born 2003)

Personal information
- Born: October 3, 2003 (age 23) Dudley, Massachusetts

Cycling career
- Sport: Cycling
- Current team: CCB p/b Levine Law Group
- Discipline: Cyclo-cross

Amateur team
- 2023–: CCB p/b Levine Law Group
Medal record
Representing United States
Women's cyclo-cross
Pan American Championships
Gold medal – first place	2025 Washington	Elite race
Gold medal – first place	2022 Falmouth	Under-23 race
Silver medal – second place	2019 Midland	Junior race

Lizzy Gunsalus (born October 3, 2003) is an American cyclist who competes in cyclo-cross. She is the 2025 Pan American and United States cyclo-cross champion.

Gunsalus has competed in cyclo-cross since age 10. She was inspired by her father and brother, both BMX and cyclo-cross racers. She won national junior championships at age 11 and 13, and often competed against older riders, coming third in Under-19 National Championships at age 16. Gunsalus represents Marian University as a collegiate athlete, winning two varsity collegiate national titles.

== Major results ==
=== Cyclo-cross ===
2019–2020
2nd Pan-American Junior Championships
3rd National Junior Championships
8th UCI Junior World Championships
2022–2023
1st Pan-American Under-23 Championships
1st National Under-23 Championships
2024–2025
5th National Championships
2025–2026
1st Pan-American Championships
1st National Championships
