= Schouweiler =

Town in south-western Luxembourg

Coordinates: 49°35′N 5°57′E

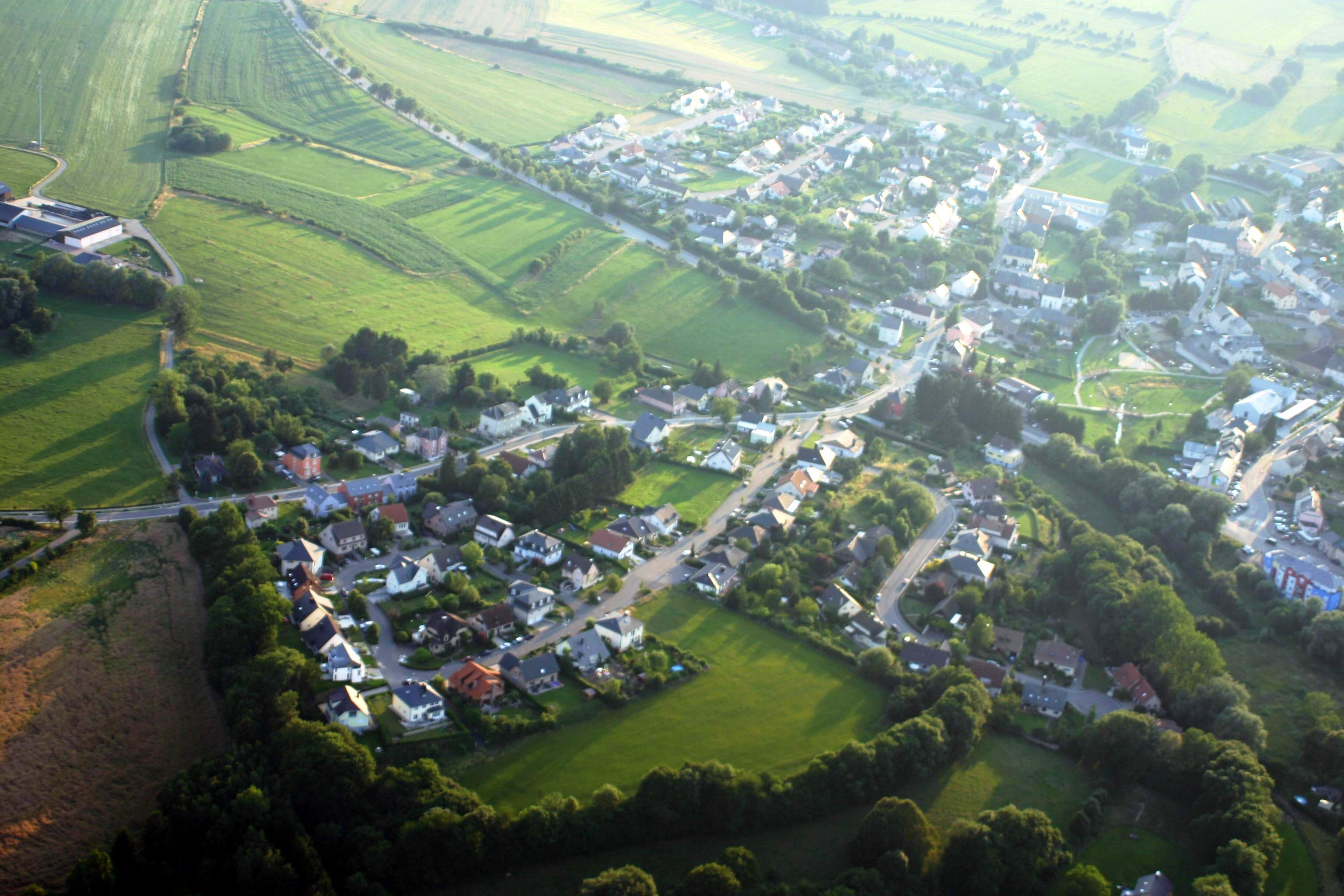
A view of Schouweiler

Schouweiler (Luxembourgish: Schuller) is a small town and village in the commune of Dippach, in south-western Luxembourg. As of September 2026, the town has a population of 1,666. It is the administrative centre of the commune of Dippach.
