= 2016–17 Cyclo-cross Brico Cross Trophy =

2016–17 Brico Cross Trophy
Details
- Location: Belgium
- Races: 6

The Brico Cross Trophy 2016–17 is a season long cyclo-cross competition in Belgium.

== Calendar ==
=== Men's competition ===
Date	Race	Location	Winner	Team	Ref
11 September	Brico Cross Geraardsbergen	Geraardsbergen	Wout van Aert (BEL)	Crelan–Vastgoedservice	
8 October	Brico Cross Meulebeke	Meulebeke	Mathieu van der Poel (NED)	Beobank–Corendon	
15 October	Brico Cross Kruibeke	Kruibeke	Michael Vanthourenhout (BEL)	Marlux–Napoleon Games	
30 December	Brico Cross Bredene	Bredene	Wout van Aert (BEL)	Crelan–Vastgoedservice	
1 February	Brico Cross Maldegem	Maldegem	Mathieu van der Poel (NED)	Beobank–Corendon	
12 February	Brico Cross Hulst	Hulst	Mathieu van der Poel (NED)	Beobank–Corendon	

=== Women's competition ===
Date	Race	Location	Winner	Team	Ref
11 September	Brico Cross Geraardsbergen	Geraardsbergen	Sanne Cant (BEL)	IKO Enertherm–Beobank	
8 October	Brico Cross Meulebeke	Meulebeke	Ellen Van Loy (BEL)	Young Telenet Fidea	
15 October	Brico Cross Kruibeke	Kruibeke	Jolien Verschueren (BEL)	Young Telenet Fidea	
30 December	Brico Cross Bredene	Bredene	Thalita de Jong (NED)	Rabobank-Liv Woman Cycling Team	
1 February	Brico Cross Maldegem	Maldegem	Marianne Vos (NED)	WM3 Energie	
12 February	Brico Cross Hulst	Hulst	Sanne Cant (BEL)	IKO Enertherm–Beobank	
