= 2017–18 Brico Cross Trophy =

Details
- Dates: 10 September 2017 – 18 February 2018
- Location: Belgium
- Races: 6

The Brico Cross Trophy 2017–18 is a season long cyclo-cross competition in Belgium.

== Calendar ==
=== Men's competition ===
Date	Race	Location	Winner	Team	Ref
10 September	Brico Cross Eeklo	Eeklo	Mathieu van der Poel (NED)	Beobank–Corendon	
7 October	Brico Cross Meulebeke	Meulebeke	Mathieu van der Poel (NED)	Beobank–Corendon	
14 October	Brico Cross Kruibeke	Kruibeke	Mathieu van der Poel (NED)	Beobank–Corendon	
29 December	Brico Cross Bredene	Bredene	Wout van Aert (BEL)	Crelan–Charles	
7 February	Brico Cross Maldegem	Maldegem	Laurens Sweeck (BEL)	ERA	
18 February	Brico Cross Hulst	Hulst	Mathieu van der Poel (NED)	Corendon–Circus	

=== Women's competition ===
Date	Race	Location	Winner	Team	Ref
10 September	Brico Cross Eeklo	Eeklo	Sanne Cant (BEL)	Beobank–Corendon	
7 October	Brico Cross Meulebeke	Meulebeke	Sanne Cant (BEL)	Beobank–Corendon	
14 October	Brico Cross Kruibeke	Kruibeke	Katie Compton (USA)		
29 December	Brico Cross Bredene	Bredene	Alice Maria Arzuffi (ITA)	Steylaerts–Betfirst	
7 February	Brico Cross Maldegem	Maldegem	Marianne Vos (NED)	WaowDeals Pro Cycling	
18 February	Brico Cross Hulst	Hulst	Laura Verdonschot (BEL)	Marlux–Bingoal	
