= Jente Michels =

Belgian cyclist (born 2003)

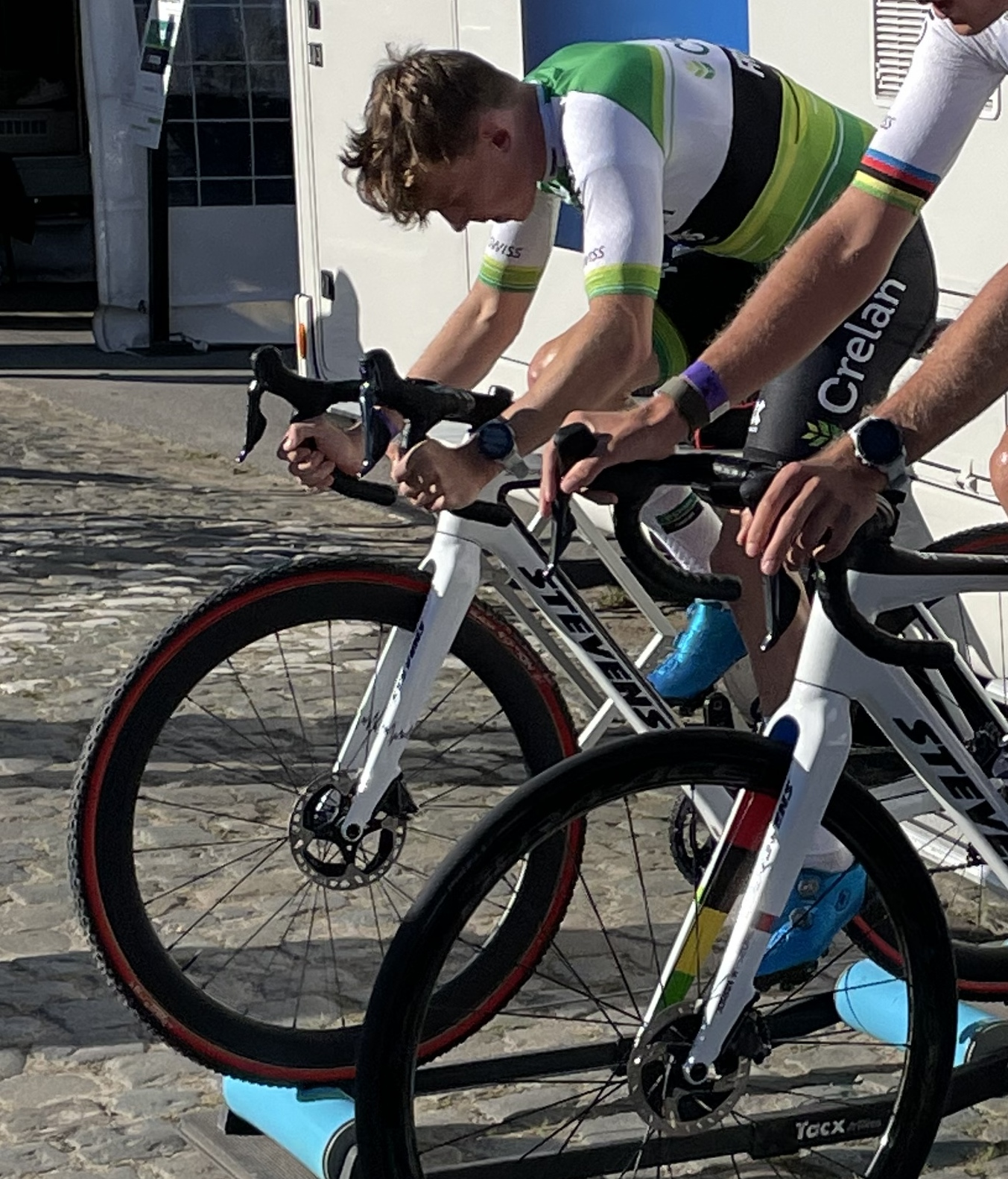

Personal information
- Born: 17 February 2003 (age 23) De Pinte, Belgium
- Height: 1.79 m (5 ft 10 in)
- Weight: 59 kg (130 lb)

Cycling career
- Sport: Cycling
- Current team: Alpecin–Premier Tech Development Team
- Disciplines: Cyclo-cross; Road
- Role: Rider

Amateur team
- 2020–2021: WAC Team Hoboken Juniors

Professional team
- 2022–: Alpecin–Fenix Development Team
Medal record
Men's cyclo-cross
Representing Belgium
World Championships
Bronze medal – third place	2024 Tábor	Under-23
Bronze medal – third place	2025 Liévin	Under-23
European Championships
Gold medal – first place	2023 Pontchâteau	Under-23

Jente Michels (born 17 February 2003) is a Belgian cyclist, who currently rides for UCI Continental team Alpecin–Premier Tech Development Team.

== Major results ==
=== Cyclo-cross ===
2019–2020
Junior Superprestige

1st Ruddervoorde

Junior Ethias Cross

1st Kruibeke
2nd Meulebeke
3rd Hulst

1st Junior Oostmalle
1st Junior Boulzicourt
2nd UEC European Junior Championships
UCI Junior World Cup

2nd Bern
5th Koksijde

2020–2021
Junior Superprestige

1st Ruddervoorde

Junior Exact Cross

3rd Beringen

2021–2022
2nd National Under-23 Championships
Under-23 X²O Trophy

2nd Baal

2nd Under-23 Koksijde
2022–2023
Under-23 X²O Trophy

3rd Koppenberg

4th Overall UCI Under-23 World Cup

2nd Tábor
4th Zonhoven
4th Benidorm
4th Maasmechelen

5th UCI World Under-23 Championships
2023–2024
1st UEC European Under-23 Championships
National Trophy Series

1st Thornton in Craven

1st Clonmel
2nd National Under-23 Championships
3rd UCI World Under-23 Championships
3rd Overall UCI Under-23 World Cup

2nd Namur
2nd Benidorm
3rd Troyes
3rd Dublin
3rd Hoogerheide
4th Antwerpen

Under-23 X²O Trophy

2nd Baal

3rd Otegem
2024–2025
2nd Overall UCI Under-23 World Cup

1st Dublin
2nd Hulst
2nd Zonhoven
2nd Benidorm

3rd UCI World Under-23 Championships
X²O Badkamers Trophy

3rd Lokeren

2025–2026
UCI World Cup

4th Tábor

=== Gravel ===
2023
UCI World Series

5th Hutchinson Ranxo

=== Road ===
2021
4th Overall Aubel–Thimister–Stavelot
8th Overall Ain Bugey Valromey Tour
