= Gerben Kuypers =

Belgian cyclist

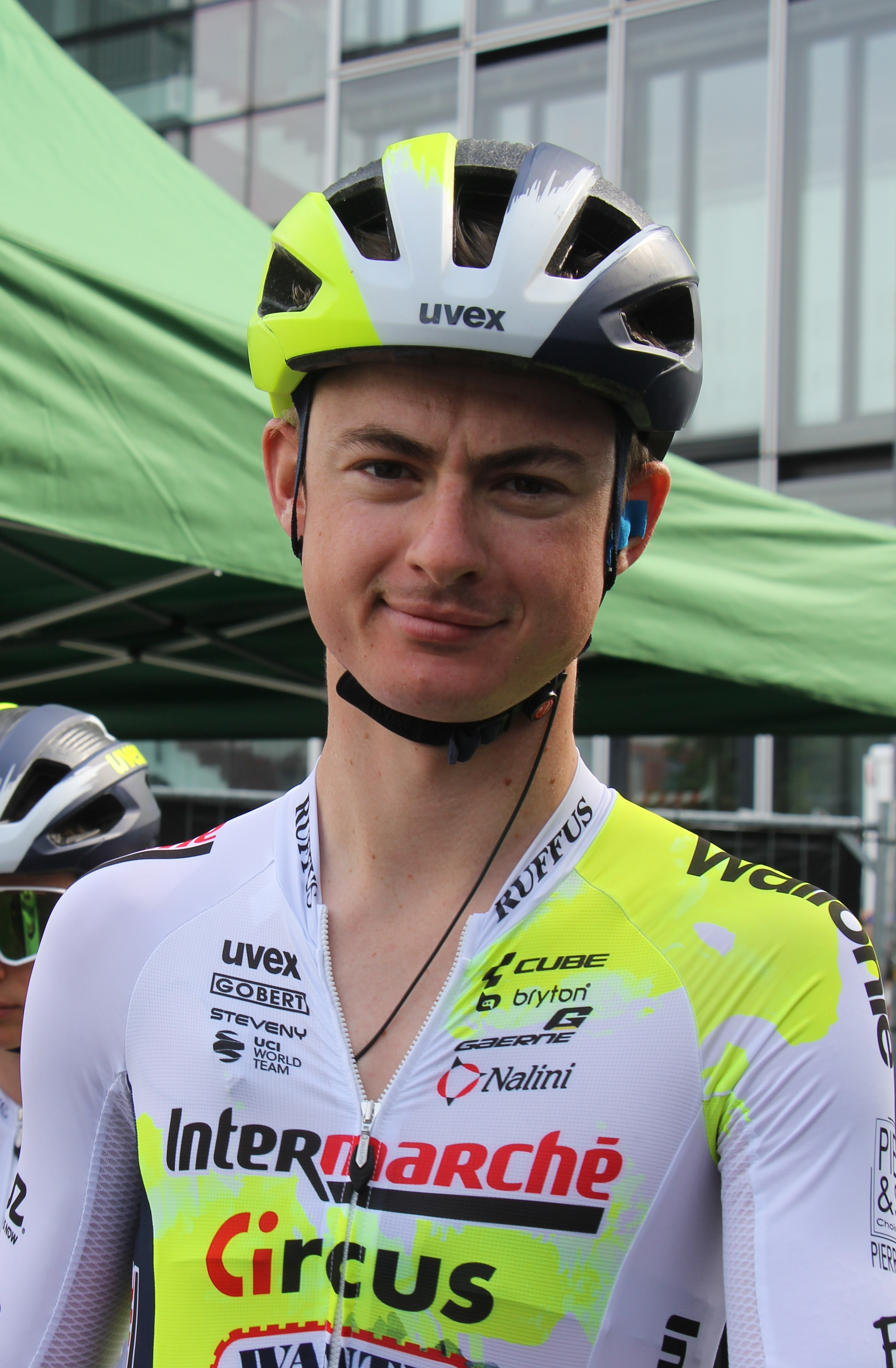
- Kuypers, Rund um Köln, 2023

Personal information
- Born: 1 February 2000 (age 26) Nieuwpoort, Belgium

Cycling career
- Sport: Cycling
- Current team: Intermarché–Wanty
- Disciplines: Cyclo-cross; Road
- Role: Rider

Amateur teams
- 2021–2022: Proximus–AlphaMotorhomes–Doltcini CT
- 2022: Team Metalced

Professional teams
- 2020: Tarteletto–Isorex (stagiaire)
- 2023–2024: Circus–ReUz–Technord
- 2024–: Intermarché–Wanty

Gerben Kuypers (born 1 February 2000) is a Belgian cyclist, who currently rides for UCI WorldTeam Intermarché–Wanty. He finished sixth in the elite race at the 2023 UCI Cyclo-cross World Championships.

== Major results ==
=== Cyclo-cross ===
2016–2017
1st Junior Zonnebeke
Junior Soudal Classics

2nd Niel

3rd Junior Mol
2017–2018
Junior Soudal Classics

1st Neerpelt
2nd Leuven
3rd Niel

1st Junior Mol
Junior DVV Trophy

2nd Hamme

Junior Brico Cross

2nd Meulebeke

2019–2020
Under-23 DVV Trophy

2nd Ronse
3rd Koppenberg

2021–2022
Under-23 X²O Badkamers Trophy

3rd Hamme

Under-23 Coupe de France

3rd Pierric

2022–2023
1st Overall Coupe de France

1st Nommay I
1st Nommay II
1st Camors I
1st Camors II
1st Troyes I
3rd Troyes II

Exact Cross

1st Essen

2nd Pétange
3rd Otegem
2023–2024
1st Ardooie
1st Oisterwijk
Swiss Cup

2nd Mettmenstetten

UCI World Cup

4th Troyes
5th Dendermonde

2025–2026
Coupe de France

1st Ouistreham

1st Pétange
2nd Otegem
2nd Béthune
Superprestige

3rd Middelkerke

X²O Badkamers Trophy

3rd Brussels

Exact Cross

3rd Sint-Niklaas

2026–2027
HG Cross

1st Lokeren

1st Ardooie
X²O Trophy

3rd Koppenberg

=== Road ===
2024
1st Stage 4 Province Cycling Tour
3rd Overall Tour de Namur

1st Stage 5
