= Jens Dekker =

Dutch cyclist (born 1998)

Personal information
- Born: 13 December 1998 (age 27) Fluitenberg, Hoogeveen, Netherlands

Cycling career
- Sport: Cycling
- Discipline: Cyclo-cross
- Role: Rider

Amateur team
- 2015–2016: Enertherm–BKCP

Professional team
- 2017–2018: Beobank–Corendon

Jens Dekker (born 13 December 1998) is a Dutch cyclo-cross cyclist, who last rode for UCI Continental team Corendon–Circus. He won the gold medal in the men's junior event at the 2016 UCI Cyclo-cross World Championships in Heusden-Zolder.

He comes from a family of cyclists, with his father Dick, uncle Erik and cousin David all being professional cyclists as well.

== Major results ==
2014–2015
1st Junior Mol
UCI Junior World Cup

2nd Heusden-Zolder

Junior Bpost Bank Trophy

2nd Baal
3rd Koppenberg

2nd Junior Overijse
3rd National Junior Championships
Junior Superprestige

3rd Zonhoven

2015–2016
1st UCI World Junior Championships
1st UEC European Junior Championships
1st National Junior Championships
1st Overall UCI Junior World Cup

1st Koksijde
1st Hoogerheide
2nd Cauberg
2nd Namur

1st Overall Junior Superprestige

1st Gieten
1st Zonhoven
1st Gavere
1st Hoogstraten
1st Middelkerke
2nd Diegem

Junior Bpost Bank Trophy

1st Ronse
1st Sint-Niklaas

Junior Brico Cross

1st Hulst
1st Kruibeke

1st Junior Erpe-Mere
1st Junior Oostmalle
2016–2017
Under-23 DVV Trophy

2nd Koppenberg

2017–2018
Under-23 Superprestige

1st Gieten
1st Zonhoven
1st Ruddervoorde
3rd Hoogstraten
3rd Middelkerke

Under-23 DVV Trophy

2nd Ronse
3rd Koppenberg
3rd Lille

2018–2019
Under-23 Brico Cross

1st Ronse

UCI Under-23 World Cup

3rd Koksijde

2019–2020
Under-23 DVV Trophy

1st Koppenberg

2023–2024
Copa de España

1st As Pontes de García Rodríguez
3rd Pontevedra

1st Ribadumia
2nd Melgaço
2nd Heerderstrand
3rd Lützelbach
