= Maud Kaptheijns =

Dutch cyclo-cross cyclist

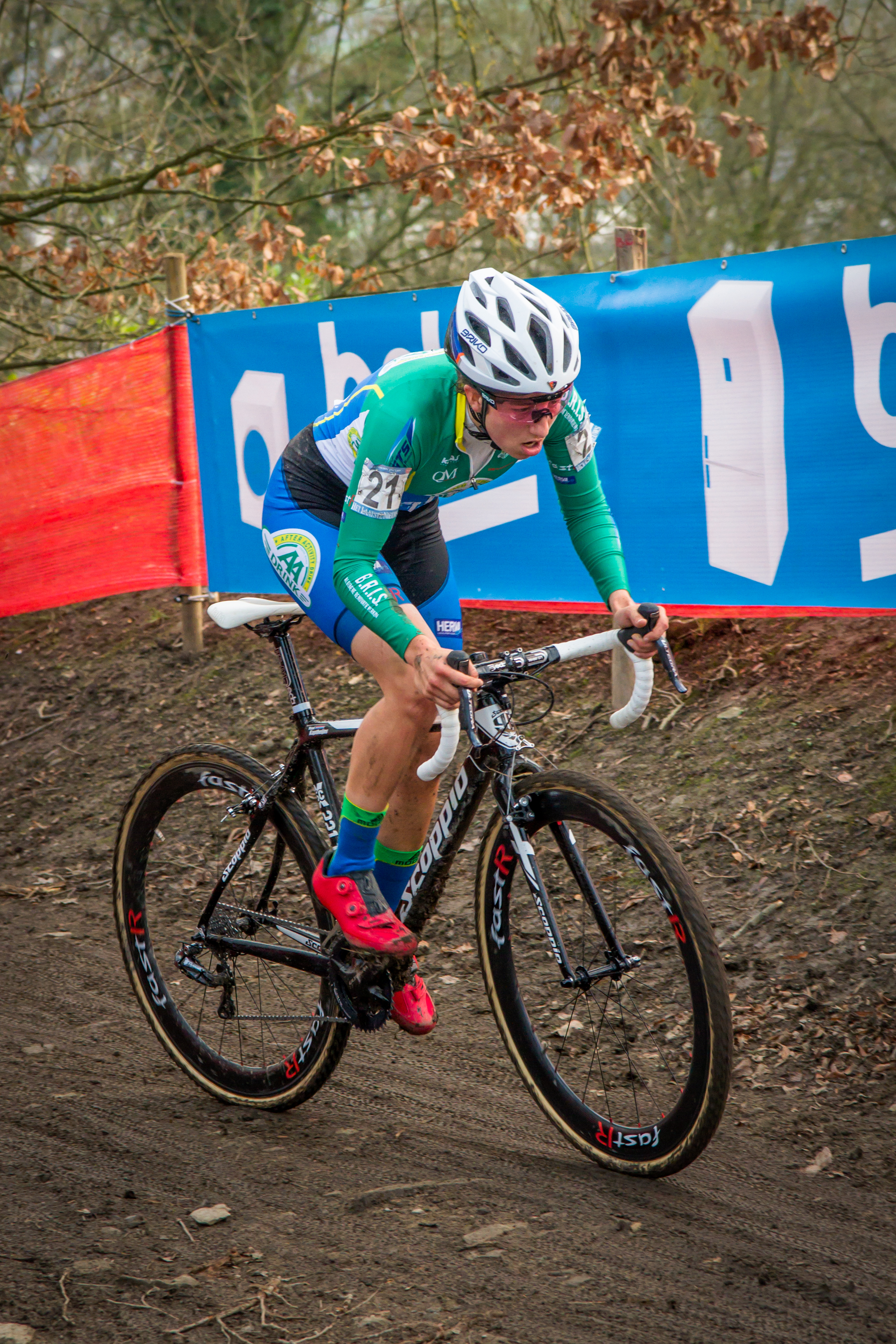
- Kaptheijns in 2015

Personal information
- Born: 28 September 1994 (age 32) Veldhoven, Netherlands
- Height: 1.65 m (5 ft 5 in)
- Weight: 53 kg (117 lb)

Cycling career
- Sport: Cycling
- Current team: CX Team Deschacht–Group Hens–Maes Containers
- Disciplines: Cyclo-cross; Road
- Role: Rider

Amateur teams
- 2014–2015: TWC De Kempen
- 2018–2019: TWC De Kempen

Professional teams
- 2015–2016: AA Drink
- 2016–2017: Steylaerts–Verona
- 2017–2019: Crelan–Charles
- 2019–2021: Pauwels Sauzen–Bingoal
- 2021–: CX Team Deschacht–Group Hens–Maes Containers

Major wins
- Cyclo-cross World Cup 1 individual win (2017–18)

Maud Kaptheijns (born 28 September 1994) is a Dutch cyclist, who primarily competes in the cyclo-cross discipline of the sport. She won the gold medal in the under-23 event at the 2015 UEC European Cyclo-cross Championships after eventual winner Femke Van den Driessche was disqualified. She also won the bronze medal in the women's under-23 event at the 2016 UCI Cyclo-cross World Championships in Heusden-Zolder. Kaptheijns took her first UCI Cyclo-cross World Cup race win when she took victory in Duinencross Koksijde in October 2017.

== Personal life ==
In September 2016 she announced that she was in a relationship with Belgian cyclist Laura Verdonschot.

== Major results ==
2015–2016
1st UEC European Under-23 Championships
Soudal Classics

2nd Hasselt
3rd Neerpelt

2nd Boom
3rd UCI World Under-23 Championships
3rd National Championships
3rd Zonnebeke
3rd Oostmalle
2016–2017
DVV Trophy

1st Lille
2nd Hamme

Brico Cross

2nd Kruibeke

2nd Brabant
3rd Oostmalle
3rd Rucphen
3rd Woerden
2017–2018
UCI World Cup

1st Koksijde

1st Brabant
2nd Overall Superprestige

1st Gieten
1st Zonhoven
1st Boom
1st Ruddervoorde
2nd Hoogstraten
2nd Middelkerke
3rd Diegem

Brico Cross

2nd Kruibeke
3rd Eeklo

2nd National Championships
2nd Oostmalle
3rd Overall DVV Trophy

2nd Ronse
2nd Lille
3rd Baal

2018–2019
Brico Cross

1st Essen

UCI World Cup

3rd Pontchâteau

3rd National Championships
2019–2020
Ethias Cross

1st Eeklo

1st Woerden
2021–2022
1st Brumath
1st Oisterwijk
