= David van der Poel =

Dutch cyclist (born 1992)

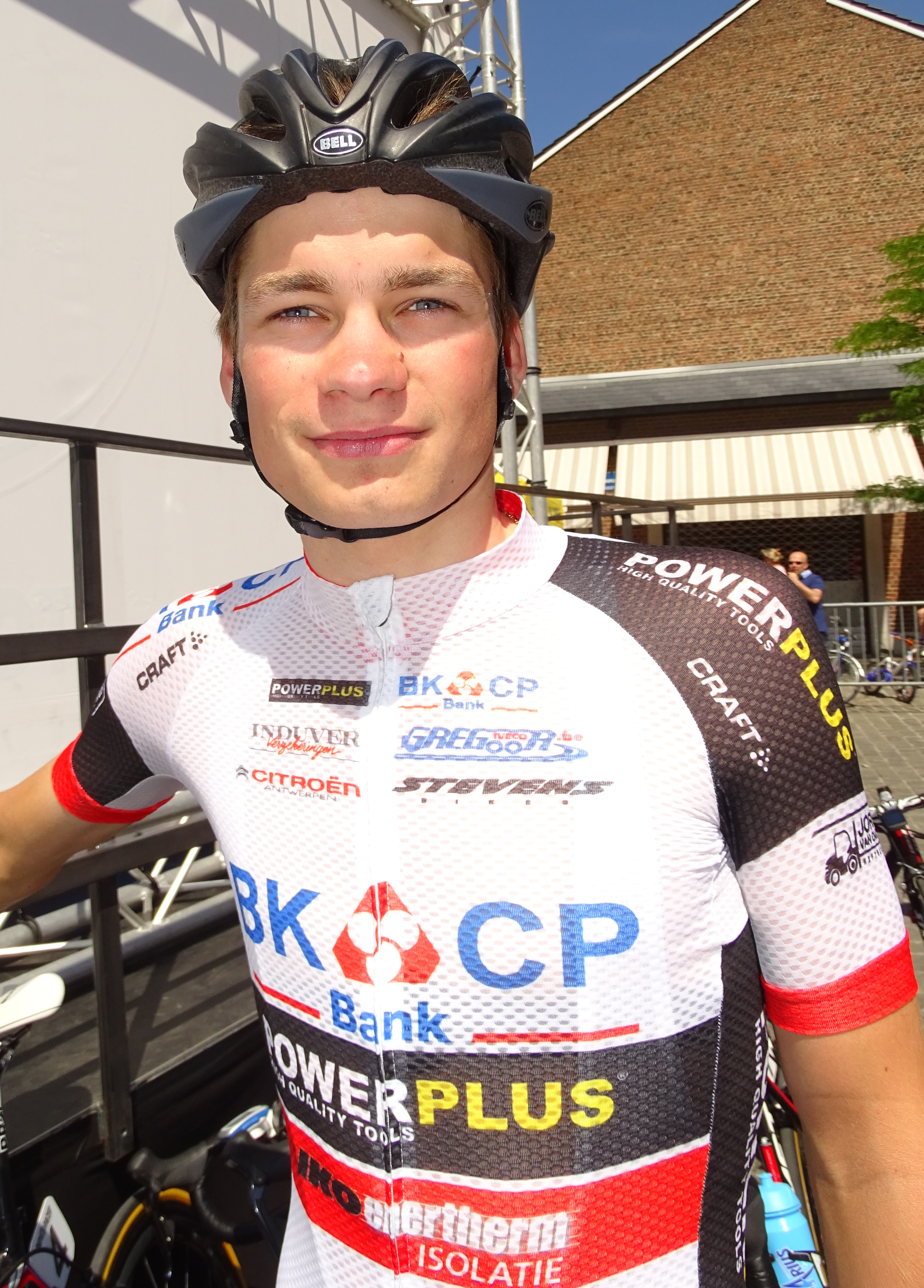
- Van der Poel in 2015.

Personal information
- Full name: David van der Poel
- Born: 15 June 1992 (age 34) Wilrijk, Belgium
- Height: 1.78 m (5 ft 10 in)

Cycling career
- Sport: Cycling
- Current team: Retired
- Disciplines: Cyclo-cross; Road
- Role: Rider

Professional teams
- 2011–2022: BKCP–Powerplus
- 2023: Alpecin–Deceuninck Development Team

David van der Poel (born 15 June 1992) is a Belgian-born Dutch former road and cyclo-cross cyclist.

He represented his nation in the men's elite event at the 2016 UCI Cyclo-cross World Championships in Heusden-Zolder.

He is the son of the Dutch cyclist Adri van der Poel, brother of Mathieu van der Poel and grandson of the French cyclist Raymond Poulidor.

He retired at the end of the 2023 season.

== Major results ==
=== Cyclo-cross ===
2014–2015
1st Pétange
1st Bussnang
2nd National Championships
National Trophy Series

2nd Milton Keynes

2nd Contern
EKZ CrossTour

3rd Eschenbach

3rd Lutterbach
2015–2016
EKZ CrossTour

1st Hittnau

Toi Toi Cup

1st Tabor

3rd National Championships
2016–2017
Toi Toi Cup

1st Slany

1st Jingle Cross
2017–2018
Toi Toi Cup

1st Kolin
3rd Slany

1st Mol
1st Rucphen
1st Radcross
1st Lutterbach
Brico Cross

2nd Maldegem

EKZ CrossTour

2nd Eschenbach
2nd Meilen

2nd Woerden
Superprestige

3rd Hoogstraten

3rd National Championships
3rd Oostmalle
3rd Hasselt
2018–2019
1st Overall EKZ CrossTour

1st Baden
1st Hittnau
2nd Aigle

1st Radcross
1st Lutterbach
Brico Cross

3rd Essen

3rd Gullegem
3rd Neerpelt
3rd Poprad
2019–2020
1st Vittel
EKZ CrossTour

2nd Meilen
2nd Hittnau

2nd Troyes
3rd Mol
2020–2021
1st Troyes
2021–2022
Copa de España

1st Karrantza
2nd Pontevedra
2nd Llodio

2nd Ardooie
2nd Xaxancx
2nd Elorrio
2022–2023
Exact Cross

3rd Zonnebeke

=== Road ===
2017
8th Velothon Wales
2018
1st Stage 1 Tour Alsace
6th Schaal Sels
2019
1st Prologue (TTT) Tour Alsace
