= Joran Wyseure =

Belgian cyclist

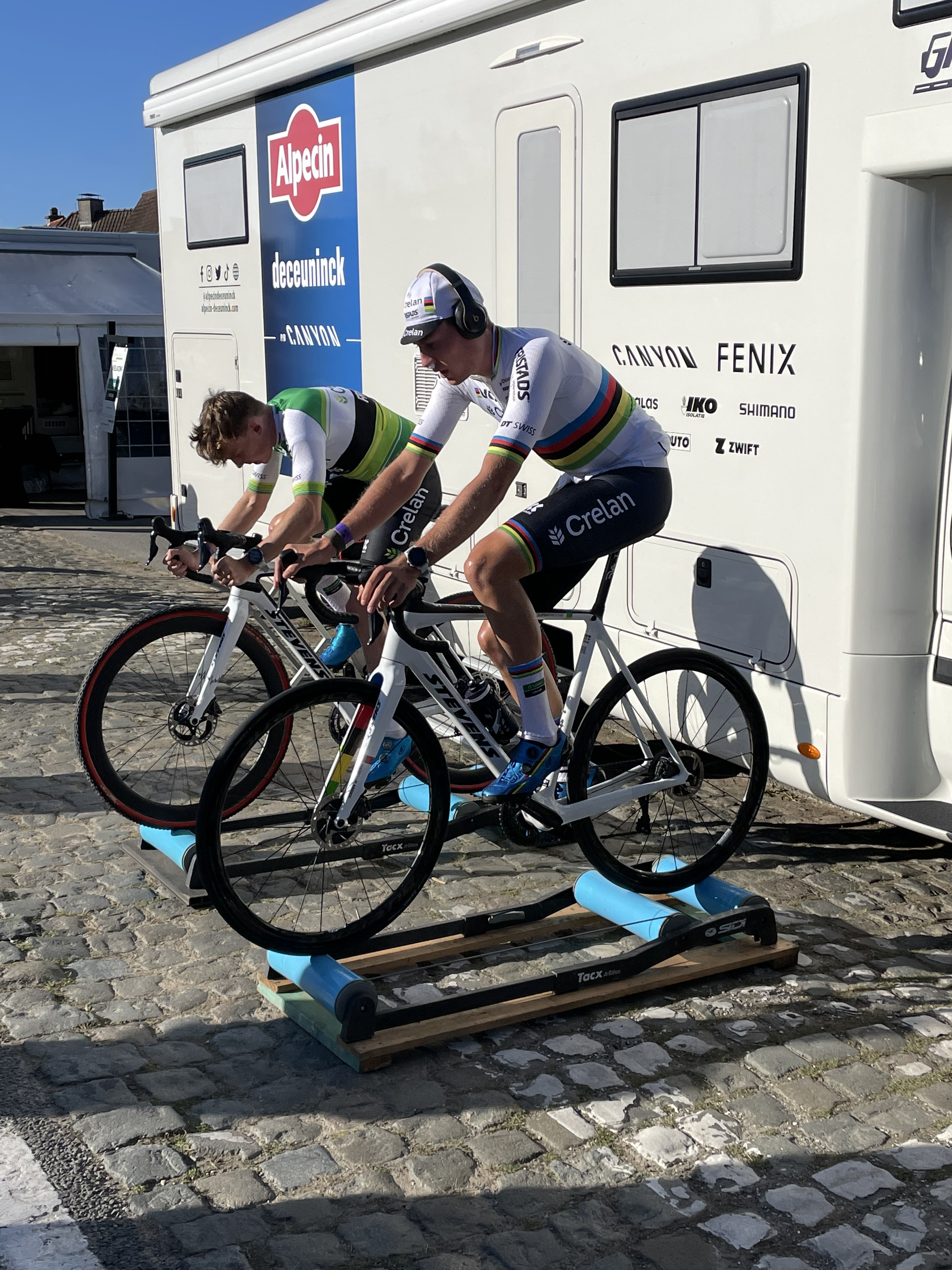

Personal information
- Born: 9 January 2001 (age 25) Roeselare, Belgium
- Height: 1.82 m (6 ft 0 in)
- Weight: 69 kg (152 lb)

Cycling career
- Sport: Cycling
- Current team: Alpecin–Premier Tech Development Team
- Disciplines: Cyclo-cross; Road
- Role: Rider

Amateur teams
- 2019: Acrog–Pauwels Sauzen–Balen BC U19
- 2020–2021: Acrog–Tormans

Professional teams
- 2021–2022: Tormans Cyclo Cross Team
- 2022–: Alpecin–Fenix Development Team
Medal record
Men's cyclo-cross
Representing Belgium
World Championships
Gold medal – first place	2022 Fayetteville	Under-23
Bronze medal – third place	2023 Hoogerheide	Team relay
European Championships
Silver medal – second place	2026 Zeddam	Elite
Bronze medal – third place	2025 Middelkerke	Elite

Joran Wyseure (born 9 January 2001) is a Belgian cyclist, who currently rides for UCI Continental team Alpecin–Premier Tech Development Team. He won the 2022 UCI Cyclo-cross Under-23 World Championships.

== Major results ==
2018–2019
Junior Brico Cross

1st Bredene
1st Lokeren

1st Junior Gullegem
Junior DVV Trophy

2nd Hamme
3rd Koppenberg

Junior Superprestige

3rd Middelkerke

2019–2020
Under-23 DVV Trophy

3rd Ronse

2021–2022
1st UCI World Under-23 Championships
1st Under-23 Koksijde
2nd Gullegem
Stockholm Weekend

2nd Täby Park
2nd Stockholm

3rd Overall Under-23 X²O Badkamers Trophy

1st Hamme
2nd Brussels
3rd Kortrijk

3rd National Under-23 Championships
UCI Under-23 World Cup

4th Dendermonde

2022–2023
1st Overall Under-23 X²O Badkamers Trophy

1st Koksijde
1st Hamme
1st Brussels
2nd Koppenberg
2nd Baal
2nd Herentals
3rd Kortrijk

2nd Otegem
3rd Team relay, UCI World Championships
2023–2024
1st Bad Salzdetfurth I
2nd National Championships
2nd Bad Salzdetfurth II
2nd Oisterwijk
UCI World Cup

3rd Val di Sole
4th Dublin

3rd Ardooie
3rd Gullegem
2024–2025
Superprestige

1st Ruddervoorde

3rd Overall UCI World Cup

3rd Dendermonde
4th Antwerpen
4th Zonhoven
4th Maasmechelen
5th Dublin
5th Besançon
5th Hoogerheide

3rd Otegem
2025–2026
Exact Cross

1st Meulebeke
2nd Maldegem

3rd Overall Superprestige

2nd Diegem

3rd UEC European Championships
3rd Ardooie
2026-2027
Superprestige

1st Middelkerke
2nd Niel
2nd Merksplas

HG Cross

1st Heerderstrand
2nd Lokeren

2nd UEC European Championships
