= Aniek van Alphen =

Dutch cyclist (born 1999)

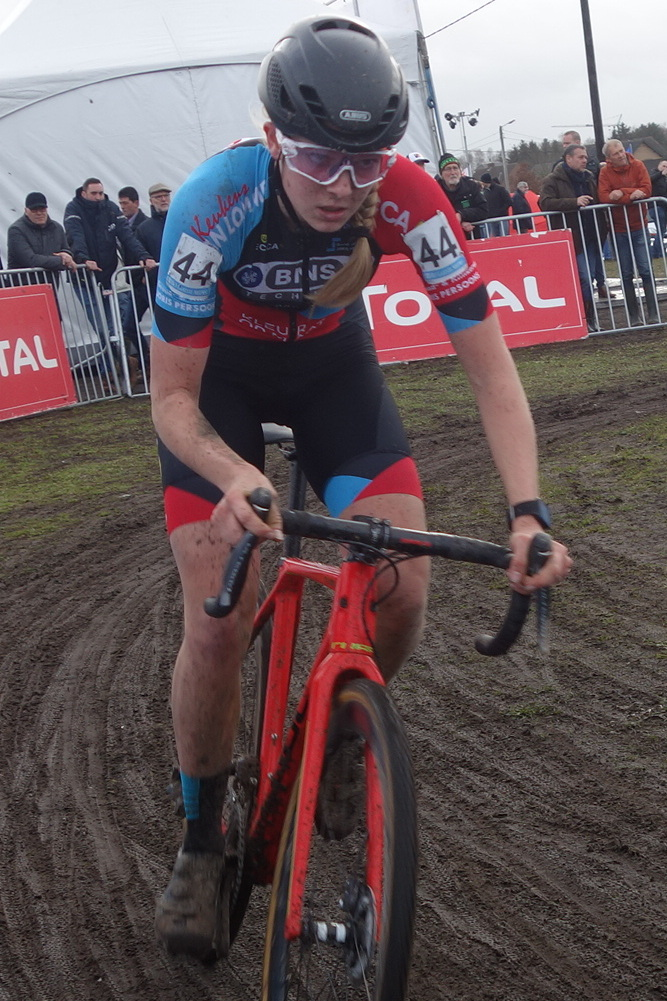
- van Alphen in 2019

Personal information
- Born: 1 February 1999 (age 27) Bladel, Netherlands
- Height: 1.68 m (5 ft 6 in)
- Weight: 51 kg (112 lb)

Cycling career
- Sport: Cycling
- Current team: Fenix–Premier Tech
- Disciplines: Road; Cyclo-cross
- Role: Rider

Professional teams
- 2020–2022: Ciclismo Mundial (road)
- 2020–2021: Credishop–Fristads (cyclo-cross)
- 2021–2023: 777 (cyclo-cross)
- 2023: Fenix–Deceuninck Continental (road)
- 2024: Cyclocross Reds (cyclo-cross)
- 2024–: Plantur–Pura (road)

Major wins
- Cyclo-cross World Cup 1 individual win (2025–26) Superprestige (2025–26)
Medal record
Representing Netherlands
Women's cyclo-cross
World Championships
Silver medal – second place	2021 Ostend	Under-23
European Championships
Bronze medal – third place	2025 Middelkerke	Elite

Aniek van Alphen (born 1 February 1999) is a Dutch professional racing cyclist, who currently rides for UCI Women's WorldTeam Fenix–Premier Tech.

== Major results ==
=== Cyclo-cross ===
2018–2019
3rd Leudelange
2019–2020
1st Munich
1st Troyes
2nd Sint-Niklaas
2nd Vittel
Toi Toi Cup

3rd Slany

3rd National Under-23 Championships
2020–2021
Exact Cross

1st Lokeren

2nd UCI World Under-23 Championships
4th UEC European Under-23 Championships
2021–2022
Exact Cross

3rd Lokeren
3rd Maldegem

2022–2023
Superprestige

1st Boom

Exact Cross

1st Essen

1st Salzdetfurth
2nd Otegem
2nd Lützelbach
2nd Bensheim
2nd Mechelen
3rd Ardooie
2023–2024
1st Mechelen
Superprestige

2nd Niel

Exact Cross

2nd Essen

2nd Ardooie
UCI World Cup

3rd Maasmechelen

3rd Otegem
3rd Bensheim
5th UEC European Championships
2024–2025
1st Salzdetfurth I
1st Salzdetfurth II
2nd Otegem
2nd Mechelen
3rd Rucphen
2025–2026
1st Overall Superprestige

2nd Merksplas
3rd Niel
3rd Heusden-Zolder

2nd Overall UCI World Cup

1st Flamanville
2nd Terralba
2nd Namur
3rd Antwerpen
4th Koksijde
5th Tábor

2nd Otegem
3rd UEC European Championships
X²O Badkamers Trophy

3rd Hamme

2026-2027
Superprestige

1st Middelkerke

=== Road ===
2020
8th Trophée des Grimpeuses
2023
9th Overall Thüringen Ladies Tour
