= Manon Bakker =

Dutch cyclist

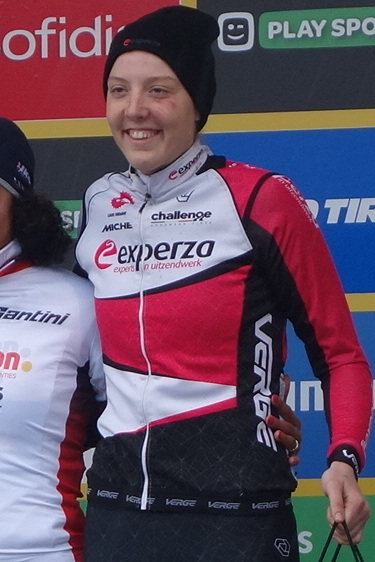
- Bakker in 2019

Personal information
- Born: 15 July 1999 (age 27) Nunspeet, Netherlands
- Height: 1.82 m (6 ft 0 in)

Cycling career
- Sport: Cycling
- Current team: Fenix–Deceuninck Continental (road); Crelan–Fristads (cyclo-cross)
- Disciplines: Road; Cyclo-cross
- Role: Rider

Professional teams
- 2018: Experza–Footlogix
- 2019–2029: Experza Pro CX (cyclo-cross)
- 2020–2022: Ciclismo Mundial (road)
- 2020–2021: Credishop–Fristads (cyclo-cross)
- 2021–: IKO–Crelan (cyclo-cross)
- 2023–: Fenix–Deceuninck Continental (road)

Major wins
- Cyclo-cross World Cup 1 individual win (2023–24)

Manon Bakker (born 15 July 1999) is a Dutch professional racing cyclist, who currently rides for UCI Women's Continental Team Fenix–Deceuninck Continental in road cycling, and in cyclo-cross for UCI Cyclo-cross Team Crelan–Fristads.

== Major results ==
=== Cyclo-cross ===
2016–2017
1st National Under-23 Championships
1st Pfaffnau
3rd 's-Hertogenbosch
5th UCI World Under-23 Championships
2017–2018
2nd Rucphen
2018–2019
2nd Rucphen
3rd Laudio
2019–2020
2nd National Under-23 Championships
2nd Iowa City
2nd Elorrio
UCI World Cup

5th Nommay

5th UCI World Under-23 Championships
5th UEC European Under-23 Championships
2020–2021
Exact Cross

2nd Eeklo
2nd Lokeren

3rd UEC European Under-23 Championships
UCI World Cup

3rd Overijse

X²O Badkamers Trophy

3rd Hamme
3rd Brussels

EKZ CrossTour

3rd Bern

2021–2022
1st Iowa City
Ethias Cross

2nd Maldegem

2nd Pétange
X²O Badkamers Trophy

3rd Brussels

3rd Boulzicourt
3rd Jablines
2022–2023
1st Pétange
1st Karrantza
2nd Maldegem
2nd Oostmalle
2nd Laudio
UCI World Cup

3rd Val di Sole

Exact Cross

3rd Loenhout

3rd Waterloo
3rd Fayetteville
2023–2024
UCI World Cup

1st Val di Sole
5th Dendermonde

X²O Badkamers Trophy

3rd Hamme

Exact Cross

3rd Maldegem

2024–2025
X²O Badkamers Trophy

3rd Lille

UCI World Cup

4th Dendermonde

2025–2026
2nd Overall X²O Badkamers Trophy

3rd Hofstade
3rd Brussels

Exact Cross

2nd Mol

2026–2027
Superprestige

1st Niel

=== Road ===
2023
9th Antwerp Port Epic Ladies
