= Kermiscross =

Race details
- Date: October
- Region: Ardooie, Belgium
- Discipline: Cyclo-cross

History
- First edition: 1995
- Editions: 31 (as of 2026)
- First winner: Pedro Roselle (BEL)
- Most wins: Paul Herijgers (BEL); Niels Albert (BEL); Zdeněk Štybar (CZE); Wout van Aert (BEL) (3 wins)
- Most recent: Gerben Kuypers (BEL)

The Kermiscross is a cyclo-cross race held in Ardooie, Belgium usually on a weekday.

== Men Palmarès ==
Year	First	Second	Third
1995	(Belgium) Pedro Roselle		
1996	(Belgium) Paul Herijgers	(Belgium) Rudy Van De Sompel	(Belgium) Marc Janssens
1997	(Belgium) Paul Herijgers	(Belgium) Pascal Van Riet	(Belgium) Gianni David
1998	(Belgium) Paul Herijgers	(Belgium) Gianni David	(Belgium) Peter Willemsens
1999	(Belgium) Bjoern Rondelez	(Belgium) Rudy Van De Sompel	(Belgium) Peter Willemsens
2000	(Belgium) Peter Van Santvliet	(Belgium) Bart Wellens	(Belgium) Marc Janssens
2001	(Belgium) Bart Wellens	(Belgium) Erwin Vervecken	(Belgium) Sven Vanthourenhout
2002	(Belgium) Erwin Vervecken	(Belgium) Peter Van Santvliet	(Belgium) Sven Vanthourenhout
2003	(Belgium) Wim Jacobs	(Belgium) Davy Commeyne	(Belgium) Peter Van Santvliet
2004	(Belgium) Sven Vanthourenhout	(Belgium) Ben Berden	(United States) Jonathan Page
2005	(Belgium) Bart Wellens	(Belgium) Sven Vanthourenhout	(Belgium) Jan Verstraeten
2006	(Czech Republic) Zdeněk Štybar	(Belgium) Erwin Vervecken	(Belgium) Klaas Vantornout
2007	(Belgium) Niels Albert	(Belgium) Sven Vanthourenhout	(Belgium) Bart Wellens
2008	(Belgium) Niels Albert	(United States) Jonathan Page	(Belgium) Dieter Vanthourenhout
2009	(Belgium) Niels Albert	(Czech Republic) Zdeněk Štybar	(Belgium) Sven Vanthourenhout
2010	(Czech Republic) Zdeněk Štybar	(Belgium) Sven Nys	(Belgium) Klaas Vantornout
2011	(Czech Republic) Zdeněk Štybar	(Belgium) Sven Nys	(Belgium) Dieter Vanthourenhout
2012	(Belgium) Klaas Vantornout	(Belgium) Sven Nys	(Belgium) Niels Albert
2013	(Belgium) Klaas Vantornout	(Belgium) Niels Albert	(Germany) Philipp Walsleben
2014	(Belgium) Michael Vanthourenhout	(Belgium) Tom Meeusen	(Germany) Philipp Walsleben
2015	(Belgium) Tom Meeusen	(Belgium) Sven Nys	(Switzerland) Julien Taramarcaz
2016	(Belgium) Wout van Aert	(Belgium) Toon Aerts	(Belgium) Klaas Vantornout
2017	(Belgium) Wout van Aert	(Belgium) Toon Aerts	(Belgium) Michael Vanthourenhout
2018	(Belgium) Wout van Aert	(Belgium) Gianni Vermeersch	(Belgium) Toon Aerts
2019	(Belgium) Gianni Vermeersch	(United Kingdom) Tom Pidcock	(Belgium) Tim Merlier
2020	No race due to COVID-19 pandemic		
2021	(Belgium) Laurens Sweeck	(Netherlands) David van der Poel	(Netherlands) Mees Hendrikx
2022	(Belgium) Quinten Hermans	(Spain) Felipe Orts	(Belgium) Laurens Sweeck
2023	(Belgium) Gerben Kuypers	(Belgium) Eli Iserbyt	(Belgium) Joran Wyseure
2024	(Belgium) Michael Vanthourenhout	(Belgium) Eli Iserbyt	(Belgium) Witse Meeussen
2025	(Belgium) Toon Aerts	(Belgium) Michael Vanthourenhout	(Belgium) Joran Wyseure
2026	(Belgium) Gerben Kuypers	(Belgium) Witse Meeussen	(Belgium) Michael Vanthourenhout

== Women Palmarès ==
Year	First	Second	Third
2015	(Netherlands) Thalita de Jong	(Belgium) Ellen Van Loy	(Belgium) Jolien Verschueren
2016	(Belgium) Sanne Cant	(Netherlands) Thalita de Jong	(United States) Elle Anderson
2017	(United States) Katie Compton	(Belgium) Ellen Van Loy	(Belgium) Loes Sels
2018	(Belgium) Loes Sels	(Belgium) Ellen Van Loy	(United States) Katie Compton
2019	(Belgium) Kim Van De Steene	(United States) Katie Compton	(Belgium) Joyce Vanderbeken
2020	No race due to COVID-19 pandemic		
2021	(Belgium) Alicia Franck	(Belgium) Suzanne Verhoeven	(United Kingdom) Amira Mellor
2022	(Hungary) Blanka Vas	(Netherlands) Shirin van Anrooij	(Netherlands) Aniek van Alphen
2023	(Netherlands) Annemarie Worst	(Netherlands) Aniek van Alphen	(Belgium) Marion Norbert-Riberolle
2024	(Netherlands) Ceylin del Carmen Alvarado	(Belgium) Marion Norbert-Riberolle	(Belgium) Alicia Franck
2025	(Netherlands) Lucinda Brand	(Belgium) Marion Norbert-Riberolle	(Netherlands) Inge van der Heijden
2026	(Netherlands) Lucinda Brand	(Luxembourg) Marie Schreiber	(Netherlands) Denise Betsema
