= Internationale Cyclocross Heerderstrand =

Dutch cyclo-cross race

Internationale Cyclocross Heerdestrand
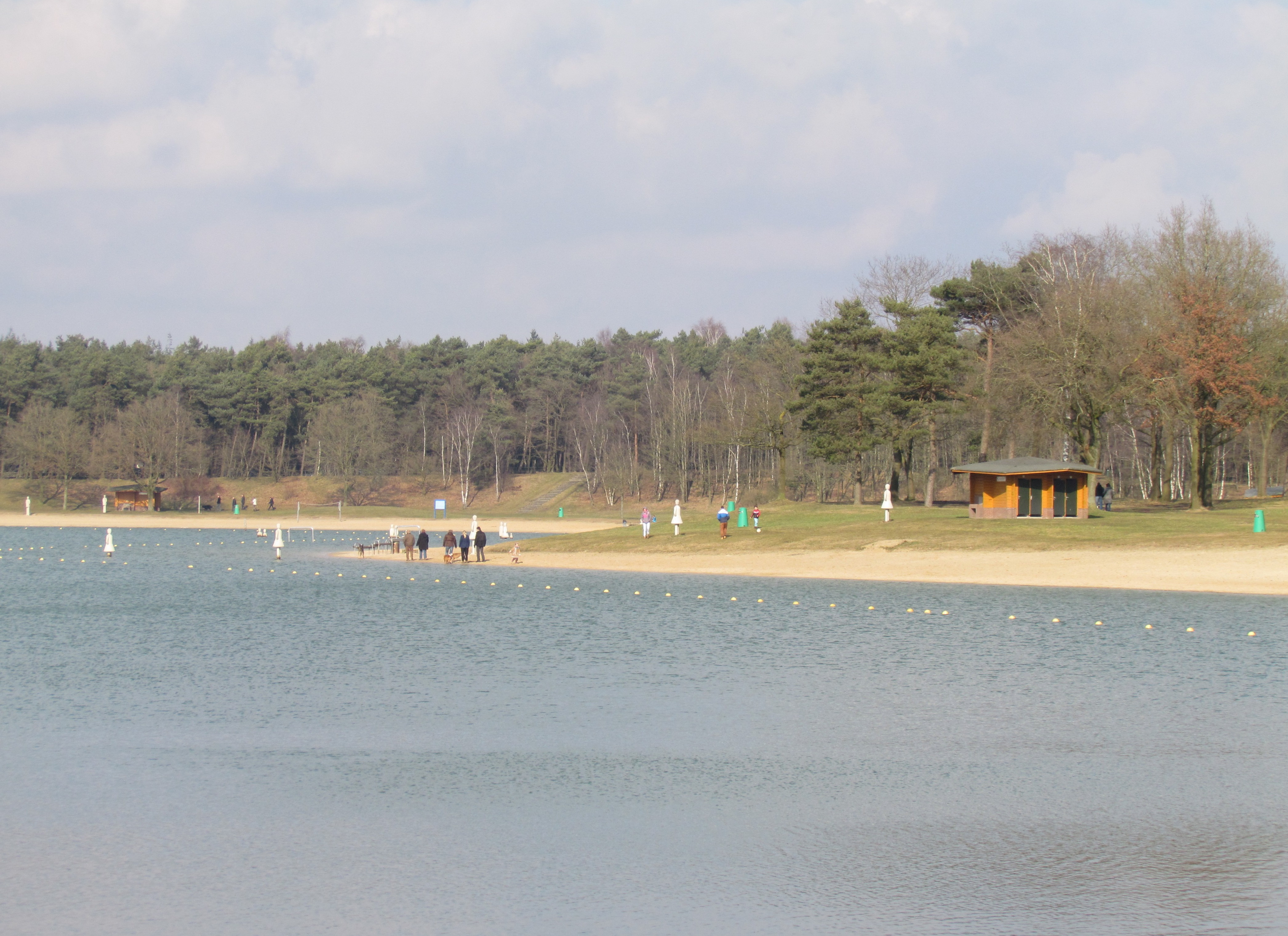
- The Heerderstrand beach; both the namesake of the event and a major technical feature

Race details
- Date: October
- Region: Heerde, Gelderland, Netherlands
- Discipline: Cyclo-cross
- Competition: HG Cross
- Type: one-day
- Web site: www.velosportveluwe.nl/cyclocross-heerderstrand/

History (men)
- First edition: 2023
- Editions: 4 (as of 2026)
- First winner: Niels Vandeputte (BEL)
- Most wins: no repeat winners
- Most recent: Joran Wyseure (BEL)

History (women)
- First edition: 2023
- Editions: 4 (as of 2026)
- First winner: Manon Bakker (NED)
- Most wins: Ceylin del Carmen Alvarado (NED) (2 wins)
- Most recent: Ceylin del Carmen Alvarado (NED)

The Internationale Cyclocross Heerderstrand is a cyclocross race held in Heerde, The Netherlands. It is currently part of the HG Cross season series.

== History ==
First organized as a national-level race in 2019, the event rose to UCI C2 ranking in 2023, and joined the HG Cross series (then known as Exact Cross) in 2024. As of the 2026 edition, the race does not charge an entry fee for spectators.

The track winds through the Heerderstrand natural area, and is notable for several long sections of sand along the shore of the park's quarry lake. Despite this, the track is generally fast, with close, tactical racing well into the final laps.

In 2025, Fem van Empel won her 50th professional race at the event, and celebrated by pulling a small Vienna Convention-compliant 50 kilometres per hour (31 mph) speed limit sticker out from under her skinsuit, before grabbing a similarly designed sign from the crowd.

The 2026 event introduced a prize of 100 kilograms (220 lb) of pepernoten for the men's and women's elite race winners, inspired in part by the 100 kilograms (220 lb) of mussels awarded at Mosselcross earlier in the season.

== Winners ==
=== Men ===
Year	Winner
2026	(Belgium) Joran Wyseure
2025	(Netherlands) Joris Nieuwenhuis
2024	(Belgium) Eli Iserbyt
2023	(Belgium) Niels Vandeputte

=== Women ===
Year	Winner
2026	(Netherlands) Ceylin del Carmen Alvarado
2025	(Netherlands) Fem van Empel
2024	(Netherlands) Ceylin del Carmen Alvarado
2023	(Netherlands) Manon Bakker
