= Daan Soete =

Belgian cyclist

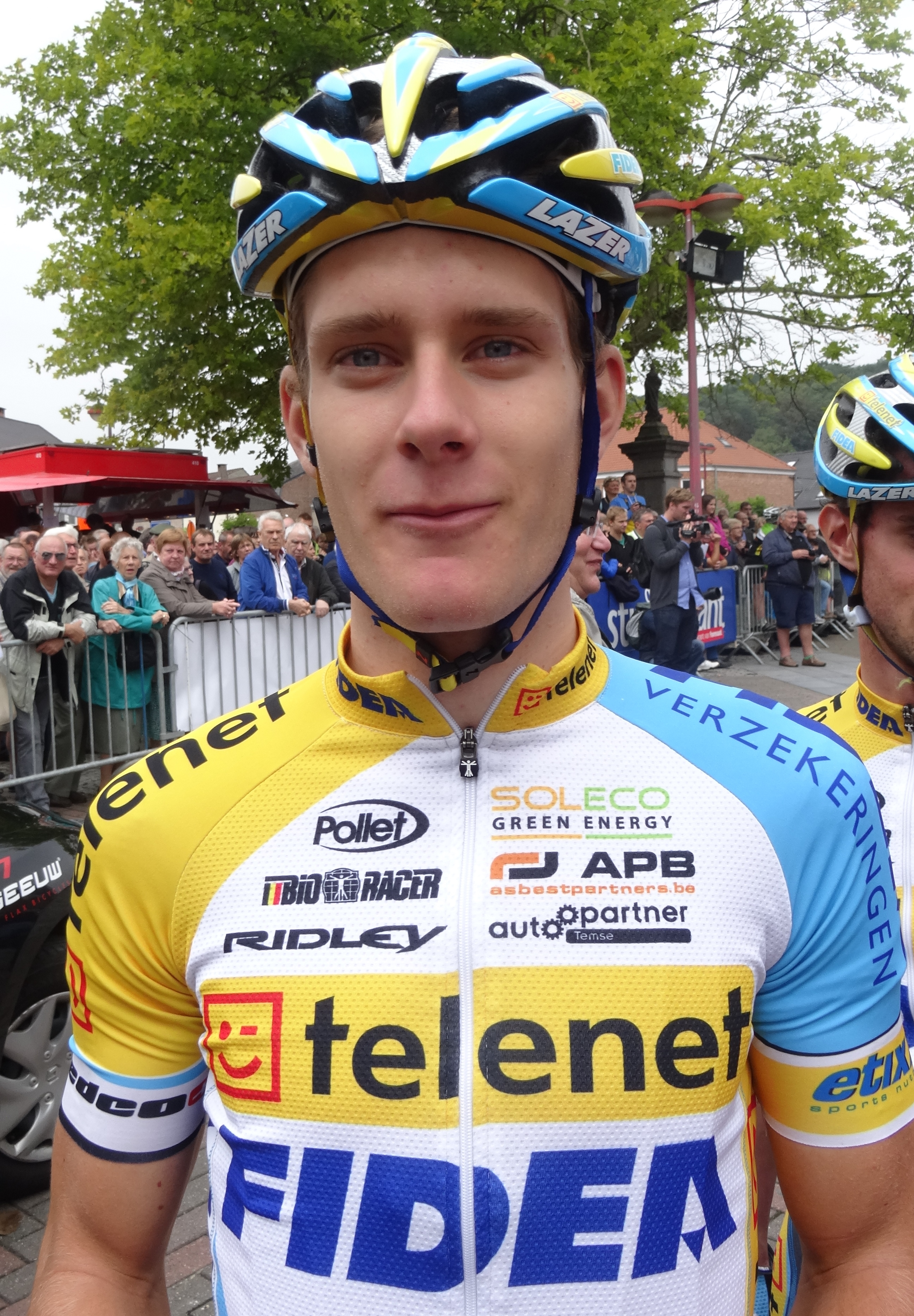
- Soete in 2014

Personal information
- Full name: Daan Soete
- Born: 19 December 1994 (age 31) Liège, Belgium

Cycling career
- Sport: Cycling
- Current team: Group Hens–Maes Containers
- Disciplines: Cyclo-cross; Road
- Role: Rider

Professional teams
- 2013–2018: Telenet–Fidea
- 2018–2019: Pauwels Sauzen–Vastgoedservice
- 2019–2020: Pauwels Sauzen–Bingoal
- 2020–: Group Hens–Maes Containers

Daan Soete (born 19 December 1994) is a Belgian cyclo-cross and road cyclist, who currently rides for UCI Cyclo-cross team Group Hens–Maes Containers. He competed in the men's under-23 event at the 2016 UCI Cyclo-cross World Championships in Heusden-Zolder.

== Major results ==
=== Cyclo-cross ===
2014–2015
UCI Under-23 World Cup

1st Koksijde

2nd Under-23 Oostmalle
2015–2016
Under-23 BPost Bank Trophy

1st Sint-Niklaas
2nd Hamme
3rd Loenhout

1st Under-23 Oostmalle
2nd National Under-23 Championships
2nd Under-23 Overijse
Under-23 Superprestige

2nd Hoogstraten

UCI Under-23 World Cup

3rd Koksijde

2016–2017
Toi Toi Cup

2nd Slany

2nd Bensheim
2nd Pétange
2017–2018
Toi Toi Cup

1st Unicov

1st Contern
3rd National Championships
UCI World Cup

3rd Waterloo

2018–2019
Brico Cross

1st Lokeren
3rd Geraardsbergen

2nd Waterloo
2019–2020
UCI World Cup

3rd Iowa City

2021–2022
1st Waterloo
2nd Fae' Di Oderzo
Ethias Cross

3rd Beringen

2022–2023
2nd Waterloo

=== Gravel ===
2023
UCI World Series

2nd Houffalize

2024
2nd National Championships
2025
UCI World Series

1st Girona

=== Road ===
2017
1st Mountains classification, Ster ZLM Toer
2021
1st Prologue Oberösterreich Rundfahrt
2022
1st Prologue Oberösterreich Rundfahrt
