= Toon Vandebosch =

Belgian cyclist

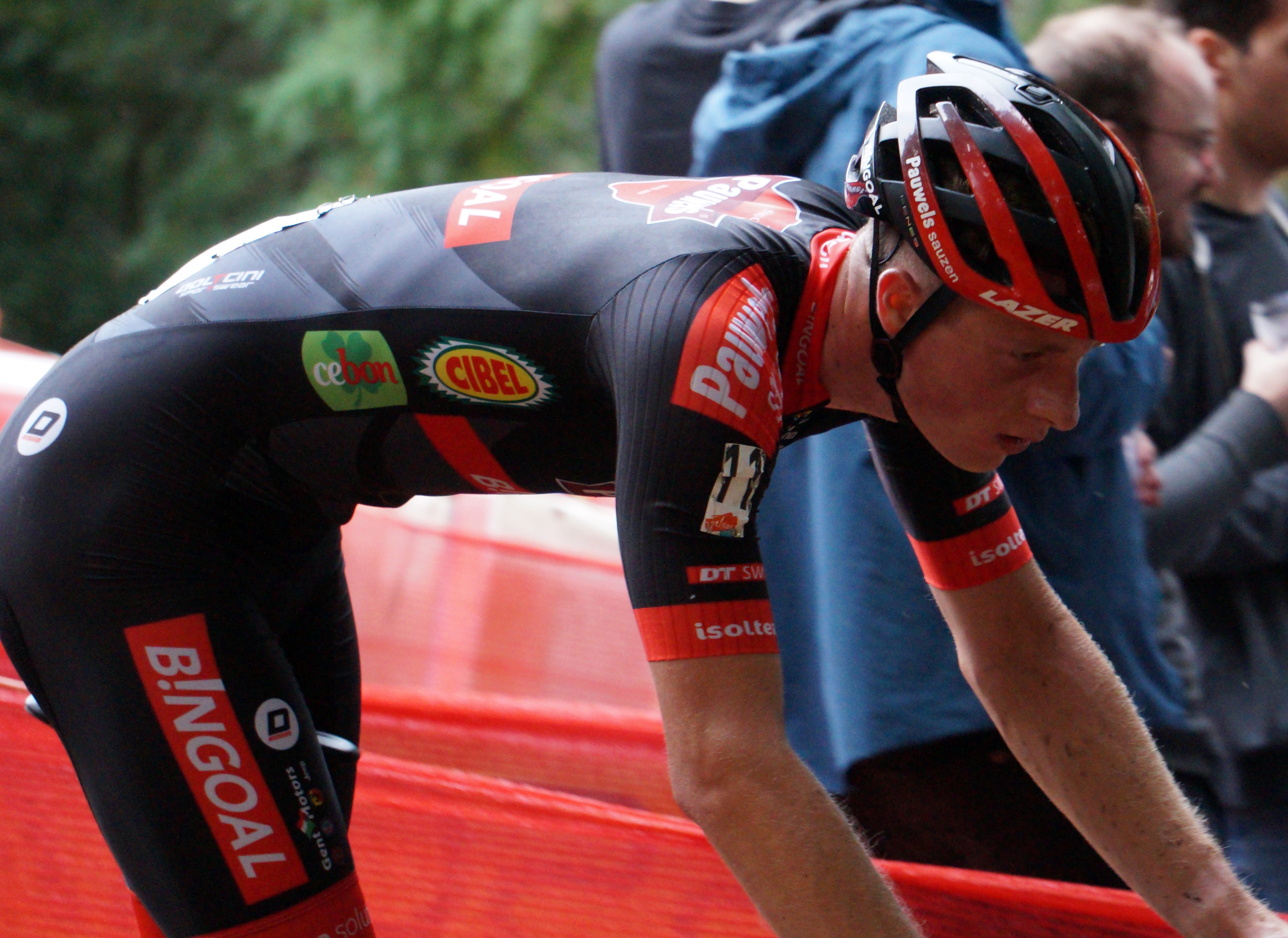
- Vandebosch at the 2021 Rapencross in Lokeren

Personal information
- Born: 19 June 1999 (age 27) Lier, Belgium
- Height: 1.78 m (5 ft 10 in)
- Weight: 68 kg (150 lb)

Cycling career
- Sport: Cycling
- Current team: Alpecin–Premier Tech Development Team (road); Crelan–Corendon (cyclo-cross)
- Disciplines: Cyclo-cross; Road
- Role: Rider

Professional teams
- 2018: Corendon–Circus
- 2018–2019: Pauwels Sauzen–Vastgoedservice
- 2019–2022: Pauwels Sauzen–Bingoal
- 2022–: Alpecin–Fenix Development Team
- 2023–: Crelan–Corendon

Toon Vandebosch (born 19 June 1999) is a Belgian cyclist, who currently rides for UCI Continental team Alpecin–Premier Tech Development Team for road races and Crelan–Corendon for cyclo-cross races.

== Major results ==
=== Cyclo-cross ===
2015–2016
Junior Soudal Classics

1st Niel
2nd Leuven
3rd Neerpelt

2nd Junior Mol
3rd National Junior Championships
Junior Superprestige

3rd Middelkerke

Junior BPost Bank Trophy

3rd Essen

3rd Junior Oostmalle
3rd Junior Boom
2016–2017
1st National Junior Championships
1st Overall UCI Junior World Cup

2nd Heusden-Zolder
2nd Zeven
3rd Fiuggi

2nd Overall Junior Superprestige

1st Ruddervoorde
1st Spa-Francorchamps
1st Gavere
2nd Diegem
2nd Gieten
3rd Middelkerke

Junior DVV Trophy

1st Loenhout
2nd Ronse
3rd Lille

Junior Brico Cross

1st Geraardsbergen

3rd Junior Oostmalle
2017–2018
2nd National Under-23 Championships
Under-23 Superprestige

2nd Zonhoven
3rd Ruddervoorde

2018–2019
Under-23 Brico Cross

1st Lokeren

Under-23 DVV Trophy

2nd Brussels

2019–2020
1st National Under-23 Championships
2020–2021
5th UCI Under-23 World Championships
2023–2024
UCI World Cup

5th Zonhoven

2024–2025
3rd Oostmalle
2025-2026
1st Essen

=== Road ===
2022
1st Stage 1 Tour de Namur
6th Overall Course de Solidarność et des Champions Olympiques
7th Overall Tour d'Eure-et-Loir
2025
1st Grand Prix de la ville de Pérenchies
