= Marion Norbert-Riberolle =

French cyclist

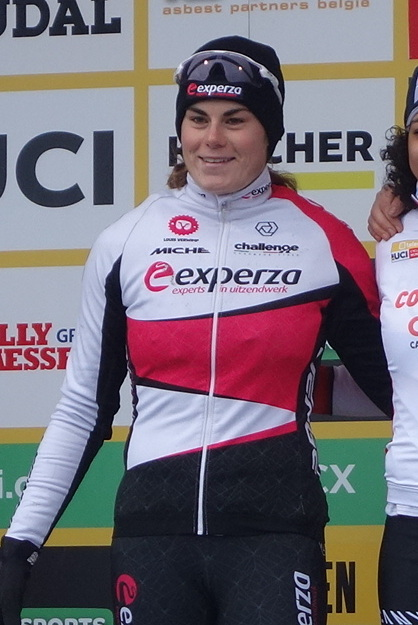
- Norbert-Riberolle in 2019

Personal information
- Born: 7 January 1999 (age 27) Troyes, France

Cycling career
- Sport: Cycling
- Current team: Fenix–Deceuninck Development Team
- Disciplines: Cyclo-cross; Road
- Role: Rider

Amateur team
- 2019: Multum Accountants Ladies Team

Professional teams
- 2021: Team Rupelcleaning–Champion Lubricants
- 2022: Plantur–Pura
- 2023–: Fenix–Deceuninck Development Team

Major wins
- Cyclo-cross National Championships (2025, 2026)
Medal record
Women's road bicycle racing
Representing Belgium
European Championships
Bronze medal – third place	2024 Limburg	Mixed team relay

Marion Norbert-Riberolle (born 7 January 1999) is a French and naturalized Belgian cyclist. She is mainly active in cyclo-cross and road racing. In 2020 she won gold at the French elite cyclo-cross championship. In the 2019–2020 season, she won gold at the U23 World championship and bronze at the U23 European championship. In 2022 and 2023 she won the silver medal at the Belgian elite cyclo-cross championship. She rides for the Belgian team Crelan-Fristads (cyclo-cross) and Fenix-Deceuninck (road).

She became a citizen of Belgium in 2021.

== Major results ==
=== Cyclo-cross ===
2019–2020
1st UCI World Under-23 Championships
1st French National Championships
3rd UEC European Under-23 Championships
2021–2022
2nd Belgian National Championships
2022–2023
1st Otegem
2nd National Championships
Exact Cross

2nd Zonnebeke

3rd Team relay, UCI World Championships
2023–2024
Exact Cross

1st Essen
1st Zonnebeke

1st Otegem
3rd National Championships
UCI World Cup

4th Dendermonde

2024–2025
1st National Championships
Exact Cross

1st Essen
1st Loenhout

X²O Badkamers Trophy

2nd Brussels

Superprestige

3rd Niel

3rd Otegem
2025–2026
1st National Championships
1st Otegem
Superprestige

1st Ruddervoorde
2nd Gullegem

Exact Cross

2nd Kortrijk
3rd Sint-Niklaas

X²O Badkamers Trophy

2nd Lokeren

3rd Oostmalle

=== Road ===
2024
3rd Team relay, UEC European Championships
3rd Time trial, National Championships
9th Overall Bretagne Ladies Tour
