= Laura Verdonschot =

Belgian cyclist

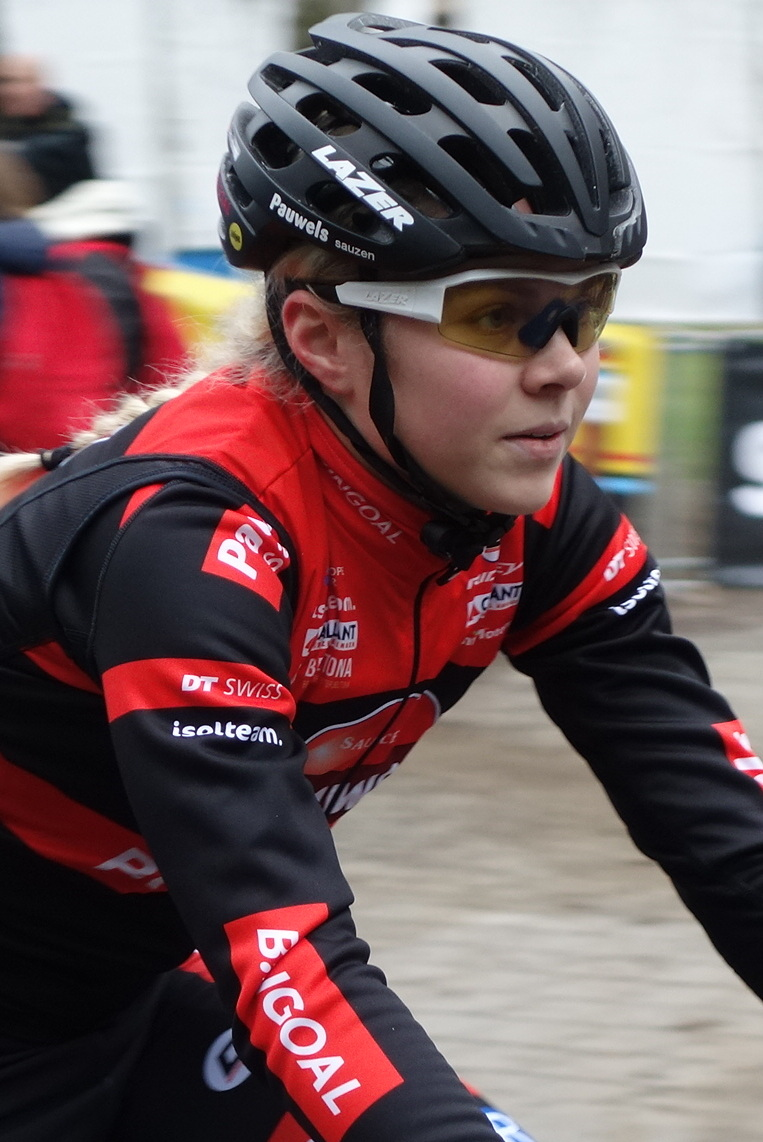
- Verdonschot in 2020

Personal information
- Born: 4 December 1996 (age 29) Lommel, Belgium
- Height: 1.64 m (5 ft 5 in)
- Weight: 52 kg (115 lb)

Cycling career
- Sport: Cycling
- Current team: De Ceuster–Bonache
- Disciplines: Road; Cyclo-cross
- Role: Rider

Professional teams
- 2016–2022: Marlux–Napoleon Games
- 2023–: De Ceuster–Bonache

Laura Verdonschot (born 4 December 1996) is a Belgian professional racing cyclist, who currently rides for UCI Cyclo-cross Team De Ceuster–Bonache.

== Major results ==
2015–2016
1st National Under-23 Championships
3rd Bredene
2016–2017
1st National Under-23 Championships
1st Rucphen
2nd Neerpelt
2nd Oostmalle
DVV Trophy

3rd Lille

Ethias Cross

3rd Geraardsbergen

3rd Sint-Niklaas
3rd Hulst
5th UCI World Under-23 Championships
UCI World Cup

5th Hoogerheide

2017–2018
1st Hulst
2nd UEC European Under-23 Championships
Superprestige

3rd Middelkerke

EKZ CrossTour

3rd Baden

3rd Maldegem
2018–2019
Toi Toi Cup

1st Uničov

1st Illnau
1st Maldegem (Note: Denise Betsema originally was declared winner, but was later disqualified.)
Ethias Cross

2nd Lokeren

2nd Mol
3rd National Championships
DVV Trophy

3rd Antwerp
3rd Brussels

3rd Neerpelt
2019–2020
Ethias Cross

1st Mol

1st Boulzicourt
2nd National Championships
2nd Woerden
2nd Vittel II
3rd Wachtebeke
3rd Vittel I
5th UEC European Championships
2021–2022
3rd National Championships
Ethias Cross

3rd Leuven

Copa de España

3rd Pontevedra

3rd Xaxancx
2022–2023
1st Xaxancx
1st As Pontes
1st Ribadumia
Toi Toi Cup

3rd Hlinsko

Copa de España

3rd Pontevedra

3rd Sanxenxo
2023–2024
Exact Cross

1st Maldegem
2nd Sint-Niklaas
3rd Essen
3rd Mol

Copa de España

1st Pontevedra
1st Gijón
1st As Pontes

1st Xaxancx
1st Ribadumia
1st Melgaço
1st Rucphen
Superprestige

2nd Middelkerke

2nd National Championships
X²O Badkamers Trophy

3rd Lille

5th UCI World Championships
UCI World Cup

5th Antwerpen

2024-2025
1st Rucphen
