= 2025–26 Cyclo-cross Trophy =

Cyclo-cross competition held in Belgium

2025–26 X²O Badkamers Trophy
- Thirty-ninth edition of the Cyclo-cross Trophy

Details
- Dates: 1 November 2025 – 15 February 2026
- Location: Belgium
- Races: 8

Champions
- Male individual champion: Joris Nieuwenhuis (NED) Elite; Guus van den Eijnden (NED) U-23
- Female individual champion: Lucinda Brand (NED) Elite

Location of Cyclo-cross Trophy races in 2025-26.

The 2025–26 Cyclo-cross Trophy, also known as the X²O Badkamers Trophy, was a season-long cyclo-cross competition held in Belgium.

== Change in Classification System ==
Starting with this season, the riders with the top 3 fastest laps will be awarded 15, 10 and 5 bonus seconds each, with each rider getting at most one such bonus based only on their fastest lap. This is in addition to the bonus seconds for the top 3 finishers of the first lap.

== Calendar ==
The competition consisted of 8 events between 1 November 2025 and 15 February 2026.

#	Date	Race	Location	Class
1	1 November 2025	Koppenbergcross	(Belgium) Oudenaarde	C1
2	2 November 2025	Rapencross	(Belgium) Lokeren	C2
3	16 November 2025	Flandriencross	(Belgium) Hamme	C1
4	22 December 2025	Plage Cross	(Belgium) Hofstade	C2
5	29 December 2025	Azencross	(Belgium) Loenhout	C1
6	1 January 2026	GP Sven Nys	(Belgium) Baal	C1
7	8 February 2026	Krawatencross	(Belgium) Lille	C1
8	15 February 2026	Brussels Universities Cyclocross	(Belgium) Brussels	C1

== Results ==
=== Elite Men ===
Date	Race	Winner	Second	Third	Competition leader
1 November	Koppenbergcross Oudenaarde	Thibau Nys (BEL)	Cameron Mason (GBR)	Pim Ronhaar (NED)	Thibau Nys (BEL)
2 November	Rapencross Lokeren	Joris Nieuwenhuis (NED)	Michael Vanthourenhout (BEL)	Niels Vandeputte (BEL)	Joris Nieuwenhuis (NED)
16 November	Flandriencross Hamme	Thibau Nys (BEL)	Cameron Mason (GBR)	Joris Nieuwenhuis (NED)	Joris Nieuwenhuis (NED)
22 December	Plage Cross Hofstade	Mathieu van der Poel (NED)	Wout van Aert (BEL)	Niels Vandeputte (BEL)	Joris Nieuwenhuis (NED)
29 December	Azencross Loenhout	Mathieu van der Poel (NED)	Niels Vandeputte (BEL)	Joris Nieuwenhuis (NED)	Joris Nieuwenhuis (NED)
1 January	GP Sven Nys	Mathieu van der Poel (NED)	Emiel Verstrynge (BEL)	Thibau Nys (BEL)	Joris Nieuwenhuis (NED)
8 February	Krawatencross Lille	Niels Vandeputte (BEL)	Felipe Orts (ESP)	Michael Vanthourenhout (BEL)	Joris Nieuwenhuis (NED)
15 February	Brussels Universities Cyclocross	Michael Vanthourenhout (BEL)	Niels Vandeputte (BEL)	Gerben Kuypers (BEL)	Joris Nieuwenhuis (NED)

=== Elite Women ===
Date	Race	Winner	Second	Third	Competition leader
1 November	Koppenbergcross Oudenaarde	Lucinda Brand (NED)	Célia Gery (FRA)	Sara Casasola (ITA)	Lucinda Brand (NED)
2 November	Rapencross Lokeren	Lucinda Brand (NED)	Marion Norbert-Riberolle (BEL)	Sara Casasola (ITA)	Lucinda Brand (NED)
16 November	Flandriencross Hamme	Lucinda Brand (NED)	Inge van der Heijden (NED)	Aniek van Alphen (NED)	Lucinda Brand (NED)
22 December	Plage Cross Hofstade	Lucinda Brand (NED)	Shirin van Anrooij (NED)	Manon Bakker (NED)	Lucinda Brand (NED)
29 December	Azencross Loenhout	Lucinda Brand (NED)	Kristyna Zemanová (CZE)	Manon Bakker (NED)	Lucinda Brand (NED)
1 January	GP Sven Nys	Lucinda Brand (NED)	Puck Pieterse (NED)	Zoe Backstedt (GBR)	Lucinda Brand (NED)
8 February	Krawatencross Lille	Ceylin del Carmen Alvarado (NED)	Lucinda Brand (NED)	Inge van der Heijden (NED)	Lucinda Brand (NED)
15 February	Brussels Universities Cyclocross	Ceylin del Carmen Alvarado (NED)	Lucinda Brand (NED)	Manon Bakker (NED)	Lucinda Brand (NED)

=== Under-23 Men ===
Date	Race	Winner	Second	Third	Competition leader
1 November	Koppenbergcross Oudenaarde	Aubin Sparfel (FRA)	Stefano Viezzi (ITA)	Kay De Bruyckere (BEL)	Aubin Sparfel (FRA)
2 November	Rapencross Lokeren	Yordi Corsus (BEL)	Kay De Bruyckere (BEL)	Guus van den Eijnden (NED)	Kay De Bruyckere (BEL)
16 November	Flandriencross Hamme	Arthur Van den Boer (BEL)	Kay De Bruyckere (BEL)	Viktor Vandenberghe (BEL)	Kay De Bruyckere (BEL)
22 December	Plage Cross Hofstade	David Haverdings (NED)	Arthur Van den Boer (BEL)	Yordi Corsus (BEL)	Kay De Bruyckere (BEL)
29 December	Azencross Loenhout	Kay De Bruyckere (BEL)	Viktor Vandenberghe (BEL)	David Haverdings (NED)	Kay De Bruyckere (BEL)
1 January	GP Sven Nys	Yordi Corsus (BEL)	David Haverdings (NED)	Arthur Van den Boer (BEL)	Kay De Bruyckere (BEL)
8 February	Krawatencross Lille	Yordi Corsus (BEL)	Guus van den Eijnden (NED)	Stefano Viezzi (ITA)	Kay De Bruyckere (BEL)
15 February	Brussels Universities Cyclocross	Yordi Corsus (BEL)	Sil De Brauwere (BEL)	Guus van den Eijnden (NED)	Guus van den Eijnden (NED)

== See also ==
- 2025–26 UCI Cyclo-cross World Cup
- 2025–26 Cyclo-cross Superprestige
- 2025–26 UCI Cyclo-cross season
