= Rapencross Lokeren =

Rapencross

Race details
- Date: November
- Region: Lokeren, Belgium
- English name: Turnip cyclo-cross race
- Discipline: Cyclo-cross
- Competition: Cyclo-cross Trophy
- Type: one-day
- Web site: rapencross.be

History (men)
- First edition: 2018
- Editions: 6 (as of 2026)
- First winner: Daan Soete (BEL)
- Most wins: Eli Iserbyt (BEL); (2 wins)
- Most recent: Gerben Kuypers (BEL)

History (women)
- First edition: 2018
- Editions: 6 (as of 2026)
- First winner: Sanne Cant (BEL)
- Most wins: Lucinda Brand (NED); (2 wins)
- Most recent: Sara Casasola (ITA)

The Rapencross Lokeren race is a cyclo-cross race held in Lokeren, Belgium. The race for professional elite riders has been held since 2018. The race is held in Park ter Beuken near the city center of Lokeren and on the banks of Durme. The literal translation of the local name of the race is Turnip cyclo-cross race; turnip root is present on the flag and the coat of arms of Lokeren.

Turnip (raap) on the current flag (left) and the coat of arms (right) of Lokeren.

The first 3 editions in 2018, 2020 and 2021 were part of the Exact Cross series. In 2023 there was no Rapencross, instead the Belgian National Cyclo-cross Championships were organized in this venue.

The 2024 race was part of the X²O Badkamers Trophy.

== Past winners ==
=== Elite Men ===
Season	Series	Winner	Second	Third
2026–2027	HG Cross	Gerben Kuypers (BEL)	Joran Wyseure (BEL)	Cameron Mason (GBR)
2025–2026	X²O Badkamers Trophy	Joris Nieuwenhuis (NED)	Michael Vanthourenhout (BEL)	Niels Vandeputte (BEL)
2024–2025	X²O Badkamers Trophy	Thibau Nys (BEL)	Niels Vandeputte (BEL)	Jente Michels (BEL)
2021–2022	Exact Cross	Eli Iserbyt (BEL)	Lars van der Haar (NED)	Michael Vanthourenhout (BEL)
2020–2021	Exact Cross	Eli Iserbyt (BEL)	Toon Aerts (BEL)	Laurens Sweeck (BEL)
2018–2019	Exact Cross	Daan Soete (BEL)	Laurens Sweeck (BEL)	Toon Aerts (BEL)

=== Elite Women ===
Season	Series	Winner	Second	Third
2026–2027	HG Cross	Sara Casasola (ITA)	Lucinda Brand (NED)	Ceylin del Carmen Alvarado (NED)
2025–2026	X²O Badkamers Trophy	Lucinda Brand (NED)	Marion Norbert-Riberolle (BEL)	Sara Casasola (ITA)
2024–2025	X²O Badkamers Trophy	Lucinda Brand (NED)	Ceylin del Carmen Alvarado (NED)	Sara Casasola (ITA)
2021–2022	Exact Cross	Denise Betsema (NED)	Fem van Empel (NED)	Aniek van Alphen (NED)
2020–2021	Exact Cross	Aniek van Alphen (NED)	Manon Bakker (NED)	Lucinda Brand (NED)
2018–2019	Exact Cross	Sanne Cant (BEL)	Laura Verdonschot (BEL)	Loes Sels (BEL)
