= Bredenecross =

Silvestercyclocross
Race details
- Date: Late December (until 2020); Late September (from 2021)
- Region: Bredene, Belgium
- Local name(s): Ere Prijs Paul Herygers (in Dutch)
- Discipline: Cyclo-cross
- Competition: Brico Cross
- Organiser: vzw Sportidee

History
- First edition: 1993
- Editions: 27 (as of 2021)
- First winner: Filip Van Luchem (BEL)
- Most wins: Wout van Aert (BEL) (4 wins)
- Most recent: Eli Iserbyt (BEL)

The Silvestercyclocross or Ereprijs Paul Herygers is a cyclo-cross held yearly in Belgium. From 1993 to 2004 the race was organized in Veldegem, from 2005 to 2008 in Torhout and since 2009 in Bredene. It is part of the Ethias Cross series. Until 2020 the race was held at the end of December, but in 2021 it moved to the end of September.

== Winners ==
=== Men ===
Year	Winner	Second	Third
2021	(Belgium) Eli Iserbyt	(Belgium) Laurens Sweeck	(Belgium) Michael Vanthourenhout
2020	(Netherlands) Mathieu van der Poel	(Belgium) Toon Aerts	(Belgium) Michael Vanthourenhout
2019	(Netherlands) Mathieu van der Poel	(Belgium) Tim Merlier	(Belgium) Gianni Vermeersch
2018	(Belgium) Wout van Aert	(Belgium) Quinten Hermans	(Belgium) Jens Adams
2017	(Belgium) Wout van Aert	(Netherlands) Mathieu van der Poel	(Belgium) Quinten Hermans
2016	(Belgium) Wout van Aert	(Belgium) Laurens Sweeck	(Belgium) Gianni Vermeersch
2015	(Belgium) Dieter Vanthourenhout	(Belgium) Michael Vanthourenhout	(Belgium) Klaas Vantornout
2014	(Belgium) Wout van Aert	(Belgium) Gianni Vermeersch	(Belgium) Tim Merlier
2013	(Czech Republic) Zdeněk Štybar	(Belgium) Rob Peeters	(Belgium) Dieter Vanthourenhout
2012	(Belgium) Sven Nys	(Belgium) Niels Albert	(Czech Republic) Zdeněk Štybar
2011	(Belgium) Jan Denuwelaere	(Czech Republic) Zdeněk Štybar	(Belgium) Dieter Vanthourenhout
2010	(Czech Republic) Zdeněk Štybar	(Belgium) Sven Nys	(Belgium) Niels Albert
2009	(Belgium) Dieter Vanthourenhout	(Czech Republic) Martin Zlamalik	(Belgium) Niels Albert
2008	(Belgium) Klaas Vantornout	(Italy) Marco Bianco	(Belgium) Ben Berden
2007	(Belgium) Klaas Vantornout	(Belgium) Ben Berden	(France) Francis Mourey
2006	(Belgium) Sven Vanthourenhout	(Netherlands) Gerben de Knegt	(Belgium) Davy Commeyne
2005	(Netherlands) Gerben de Knegt	(Belgium) Klaas Vantornout	(Belgium) Davy Commeyne
2004	(Belgium) Mario De Clercq	(Belgium) Tim Van Nuffel	(Belgium) David Willemsens
2003	(Belgium) Sven Vanthourenhout	(Belgium) Bjorn Rondelez	(Belgium) David Willemsens
2002	(Belgium) Mario De Clercq	(Belgium) Sven Vanthourenhout	(Poland) Dariusz Gil
2001	(Belgium) Sven Vanthourenhout	(Belgium) Bart Wellens	(Belgium) Mario De Clercq
2000	(Belgium) Bart Wellens	(Belgium) Mario De Clercq	(Belgium) Kipcho Volckaerts
1999	(Belgium) Bart Wellens	(Belgium) Mario De Clercq	(Belgium) David Willemsens
1998	(Belgium) Peter Van Den Abeele	(Belgium) Bjorn Rondelez	(Belgium) Paul Herygers
1997	(Belgium) Mario De Clercq	(Belgium) Danny De Bie	(Belgium) Sven Nys
1996	(Belgium) Paul Herygers	(Belgium) Peter Van Den Abeele	(Belgium) Peter Willemsens
1993	(Belgium) Filip Van Luchem	(Belgium) Paul Herygers	(Belgium) Alex Moonen

=== Women ===
Year	Winner	Second	Third
2021	(Netherlands) Denise Betsema	(Netherlands) Yara Kastelijn	(Netherlands) Puck Pieterse
2020	(Hungary) Kata Blanka Vas	(Belgium) Sanne Cant	(Belgium) Alicia Franck
2019	(Belgium) Sanne Cant	(United Kingdom) Anna Kay	(United States) Rebecca Fahringer
2018	(Netherlands) Lucinda Brand	(Belgium) Loes Sels	(Italy) Eva Lechner
2017	(Italy) Alice Maria Arzuffi	(United Kingdom) Helen Wyman	(Belgium) Loes Sels
2016	(Netherlands) Thalita de Jong	(Belgium) Ellen Van Loy	(Belgium) Jolien Verschueren

== External links & references ==
- Official website
- Brico Cross Bredene - Honours List
