= Zilvermeercross =

Belgian cyclo-cross race

Race details
- Date: December/January
- Region: Mol, Belgium
- Discipline: Cyclo-cross
- Competition: Superprestige
- Type: one-day

History (men)
- First edition: 2014
- Editions: 11 (as of 2025)
- First winner: Wout Van Aert (BEL)
- Most wins: Mathieu van der Poel (NED) (5 wins)
- Most recent: Mathieu van der Poel (NED)

History (women)
- First edition: 2014
- Editions: 11 (as of 2025)
- First winner: Jolien Verschueren (BEL)
- Most wins: Lucinda Brand (NED) (3 wins)
- Most recent: Ceylin del Carmen Alvarado (NED)

The Zilvermeercross is a cyclo-cross race that has been organized annually since 2014 in Mol, Belgium. It is named after the Provinciaal Domein het Zilvermeer, where it is held on the sandy edge of a bathing lake. In 2022 and 2023 it was part of the Exact Cross. Since 2024 it is part of Superprestige series.

== Winners ==
=== Men ===
Year	Winner	Second	Third
2014	(Belgium) Wout Van Aert	(Netherlands) Mathieu van der Poel	(Belgium) Tom Meeusen
2015	(Belgium) Wout Van Aert	(Belgium) Laurens Sweeck	(Belgium) Tom Meeusen
2016	(Netherlands) Mathieu van der Poel	(Belgium) Wout Van Aert	(Belgium) Tom Meeusen
2017	(Netherlands) David van der Poel	(Netherlands) Corné van Kessel	(Belgium) Tom Meeusen
2018	(Netherlands) Corné van Kessel	(Belgium) Jim Aernouts	(Belgium) Thijs Aerts
2019	(Netherlands) Mathieu van der Poel	(Belgium) Tom Meeusen	(Netherlands) David van der Poel
2021	(Belgium) Wout Van Aert	(Belgium) Laurens Sweeck	(Netherlands) Lars van der Haar
2022	(Belgium) Wout Van Aert	(Netherlands) Mathieu van der Poel	(United Kingdom) Tom Pidcock
2023	(Netherlands) Mathieu van der Poel	(Belgium) Wout Van Aert	(Belgium) Niels Vandeputte
2024	(Netherlands) Mathieu van der Poel	(Belgium) Laurens Sweeck	(Belgium) Michael Vanthourenhout
2025	(Netherlands) Mathieu van der Poel	(Belgium) Toon Aerts	(Spain) Felipe Orts Lloret

=== Women ===
Year	Winner	Second	Third
2014	(Belgium) Jolien Verschueren	(Netherlands) Sabrina Stultiens	(Netherlands) Sanne van Paassen
2015	(Netherlands) Sabrina Stultiens	(Belgium) Ellen Van Loy	(Belgium) Sanne Cant
2016	(Belgium) Sanne Cant	(Netherlands) Lucinda Brand	(Belgium) Ellen Van Loy
2017	(Netherlands) Lucinda Brand	(Belgium) Kim Van De Steene	(Belgium) Loes Sels
2018	(Belgium) Sanne Cant	(Belgium) Laura Verdonschot	(Netherlands) Inge van der Heijden
2019	(Belgium) Laura Verdonschot	(Netherlands) Shirin van Anrooij	(Netherlands) Inge van der Heijden
2021	(Netherlands) Lucinda Brand	(Netherlands) Denise Betsema	(Netherlands) Marianne Vos
2022	(Netherlands) Shirin van Anrooij	(Netherlands) Lucinda Brand	(Netherlands) Annemarie Worst
2023	(Netherlands) Lucinda Brand	(Netherlands) Shirin van Anrooij	(Belgium) Laura Verdonschot
2024	(Netherlands) Ceylin del Carmen Alvarado	(Netherlands) Lucinda Brand	(Netherlands) Inge van der Heijden
2025	(Netherlands) Ceylin del Carmen Alvarado	(Netherlands) Manon Bakker	(Belgium) Julie Brouwers
