= Berencross =

Race details
- Date: October
- Region: Meulebeke, Belgium
- Discipline: Cyclo-cross
- Competition: Ethias Cross

History
- First edition: 2016
- Editions: 8 (as of 2026)
- First winner: Mathieu van der Poel (NED)
- Most wins: Michael Vanthourenhout (BEL) (4 wins)
- Most recent: Michael Vanthourenhout (BEL)

The Berencross is a cyclo-cross race held in Meulebeke, Belgium, which is part of the Ethias Cross, formerly known as the Brico Cross. From 2022, the event was renamed to Exact Cross, but most people continue to use the name Berencross..

== Past winners ==
Year	Men's winner	Women's winner
2026	(Belgium) Michael Vanthourenhout	(Luxembourg) Marie Schreiber
2025	(Belgium) Joran Wyseure	(Netherlands) Inge van der Heijden
2023	Cancelled (replaced by National championships)	
2022	(Belgium) Michael Vanthourenhout	(Netherlands) Lucinda Brand
2021	(Belgium) Michael Vanthourenhout	(Belgium) Sanne Cant
2020	Cancelled (replaced by National championships)	
2019	(Belgium) Michael Vanthourenhout	(Netherlands) Ceylin del Carmen Alvarado
2018	(Netherlands) Mathieu van der Poel	(Belgium) Sanne Cant
2017	(Netherlands) Mathieu van der Poel	(Belgium) Sanne Cant
2016	(Netherlands) Mathieu van der Poel	(Belgium) Ellen Van Loy
