= Meulebeke =

- Municipality
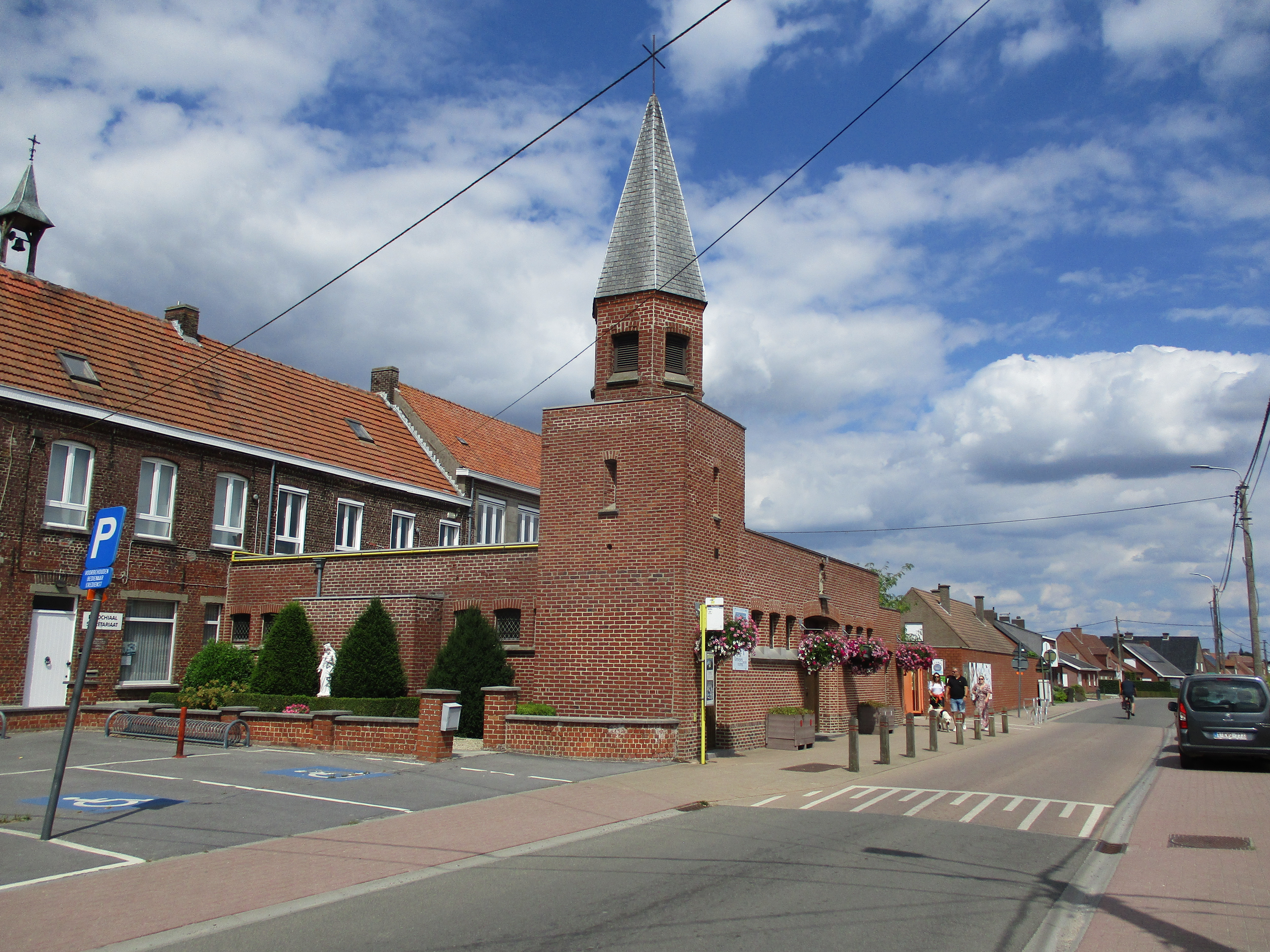

- Flag Coat of arms

- Location of Meulebeke in West Flanders
- Interactive map of Meulebeke
- Location in Belgium
- Coordinates: 50°57′N 03°17′E
- Country: Belgium
- Community: Flemish Community
- Region: Flemish Region
- Province: West Flanders
- Arrondissement: Tielt

Government
  - Mayor: Dirk Verwilst (CD&V)
  - Governing party: CD&V

Population (2018-01-01)
  - Total: 10,906
- Postal codes: 8760
- NIS code: 37007
- Area codes: 051
- Website: www.meulebeke.be

Meulebeke (Dutch pronunciation: [ˈmøːləˌbeːkə]; West Flemish: Mullebeke) is a former municipality located in the Belgian province of West Flanders. The municipality comprises only the town of Meulebeke proper. On January 1, 2006, Meulebeke had a total population of 10,980. The total area is 29.35 km² which gives a population density of 374 inhabitants per km².

== Famous inhabitants ==
- Karel van Mander, painter and early art historian (1548)
- Gianni Meersman, professional cyclist (1985)

== See also ==
- Libeco-Lagae, textile manufacturer
