= Kruibeke =

- Municipality
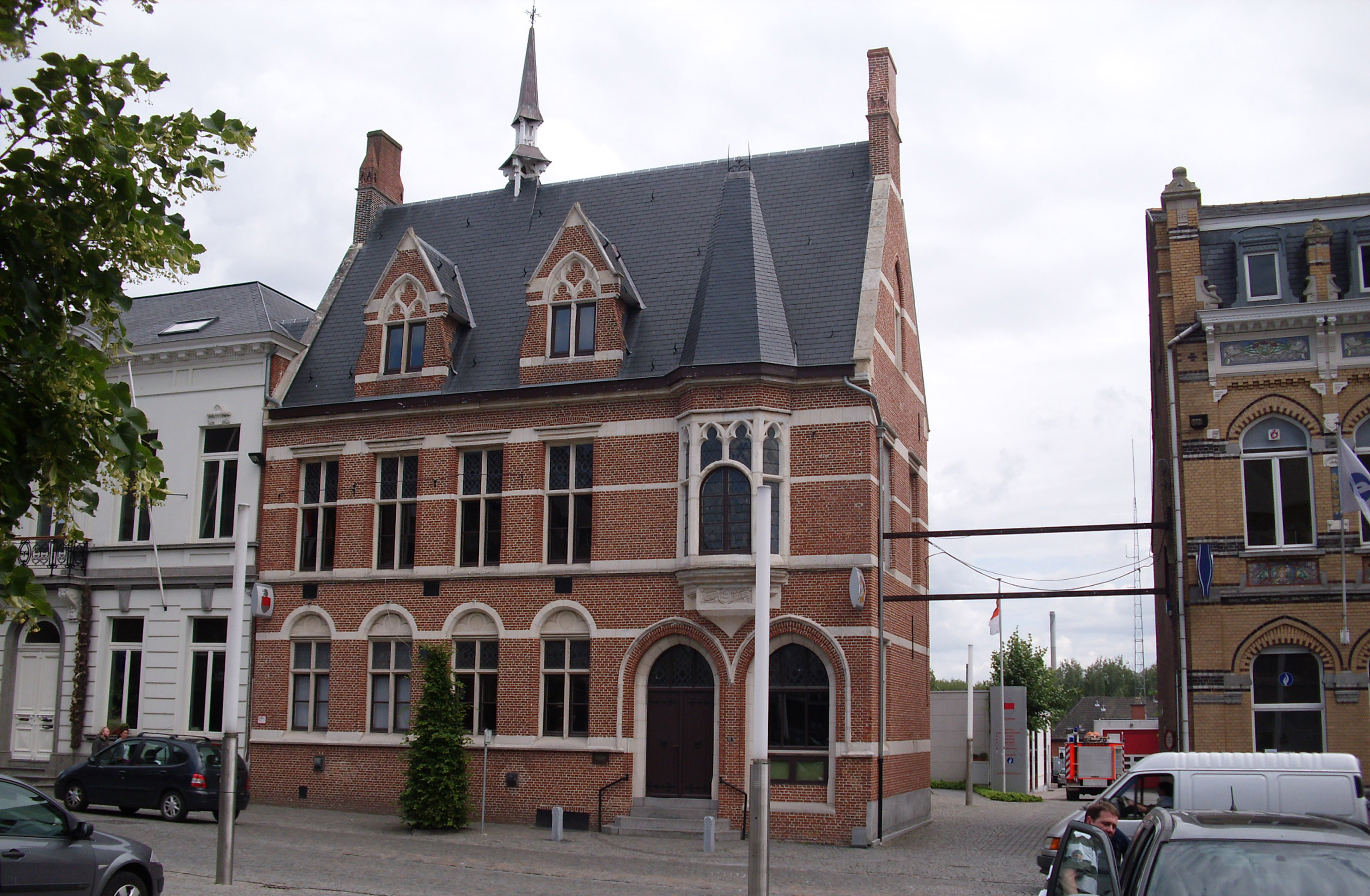
- Kruibeke town hall

- Flag Coat of arms

- Location of Kruibeke in East Flanders
- Interactive map of Kruibeke
- Location in Belgium
- Coordinates: 51°10′N 04°18′E
- Country: Belgium
- Community: Flemish Community
- Region: Flemish Region
- Province: East Flanders
- Arrondissement: Sint-Niklaas

Government
  - Mayor: Antoine Denert
  - Governing parties: N-VA, CD&V

Population (2018-01-01)
  - Total: 16,657
- Postal codes: 9150
- NIS code: 46013
- Area codes: 03
- Website: www.kruibeke.be

Kruibeke (Dutch pronunciation: [ˈkrœybeːkə]) is a former municipality and current submunicipality of Beveren-Kruibeke-Zwijndrecht located in the Belgian province of East Flanders. The municipality comprises the towns of Bazel, Kruibeke proper and Rupelmonde. On 1 January 2018, Kruibeke had a total population of 16,657. The total area is 33.42 km^{2}.

The oldest secular centre of the area is the feudal castle of Wissekerke at Bazel, which was inhabited by the ancient family Vilain until 1989.

In March 2003, the mayor at that time Antoine Denert set up the Department of Tenderness to encourage residents to be nicer to each other. Denert worried that "people don't cuddle anymore and that's the reason why there are so many conflicts." and announced: "I will set an example and start in my own village by caressing, cuddling and kissing as many people as possible." He officially added Tenderness to his alderman portfolio of duties, until then Work, Environment and Budget. As of 26 August 2004, no other civic governments have adopted this idea.

Jos Stassen was mayor from 2013 to 2018, where he led a majority composed of SamenVoorKruibeke (Vooruit, Groen and Open VLD) and CD&V. Their combined efforts gave them a majority over the largest party, N-VA, led by former mayor Antoine Denert.

From 2018 to 2022 Dimitri van Laere took over the mantle of mayor by creating a majority composed of N-VA, CD&V and a couple of independents who were previously part of former mayor Antoine Denert's party D.E.N.E.R.T.. In 2022, this coalition brought Antoine Denert back on board to act as mayor as they started preparing a fusion with neighboring municipalities Beveren and Zwijndrecht, slated for completion by the end of 2024, start of 2025.

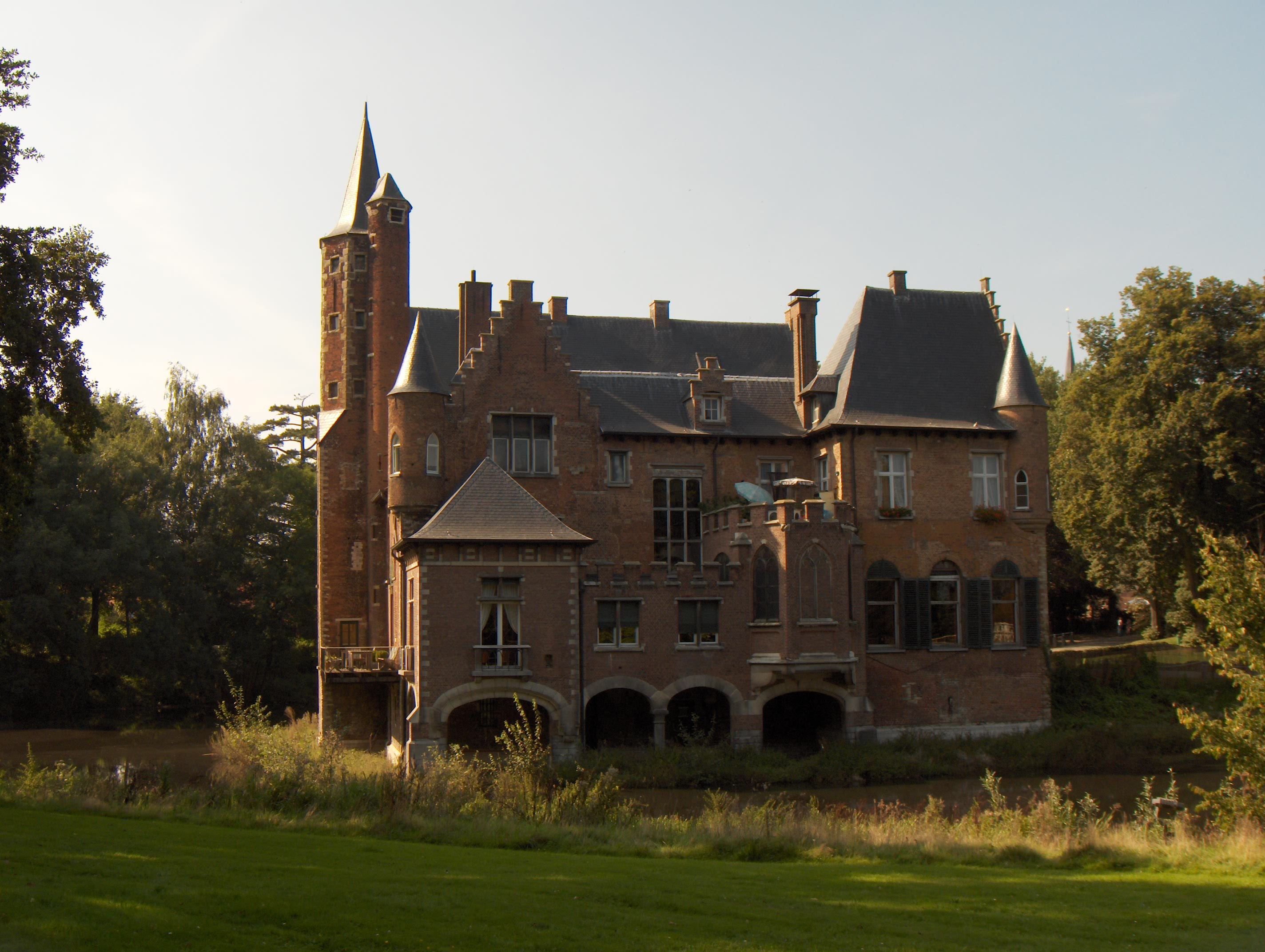
Bazel town, Wissekerke Castle

== Famous inhabitants ==
- Gerardus Mercator, cartographer
