= Polderscross =

Belgian cyclo-cross race

Race details
- Date: October
- Region: Kruibeke, Belgium
- Discipline: Cyclo-cross
- Competition: Exact Cross

History
- First edition: 2016
- Editions: 5 (as of 2021)
- First winner: Men: Michael Vanthourenhout (BEL); Women: Jolien Verschueren (BEL)
- Most recent: Men: Michael Vanthourenhout (BEL); Women: Fem van Empel (NED)

The Polderscross is a cyclo-cross race held in Kruibeke, Belgium, which is part of the Exact Cross, formerly known as the Ethias Cross/Brico Cross.

== Past winners ==
Year	Men's winner	Women's winner
2022	(Belgium) Michael Vanthourenhout	(Netherlands) Fem van Empel
2021	cancelled	
2020	(Belgium) Toon Aerts	(Netherlands) Lucinda Brand
2019	(Belgium) Eli Iserbyt	(Netherlands) Annemarie Worst
2017	(Netherlands) Mathieu van der Poel	(United States) Katie Compton
2016	(Belgium) Michael Vanthourenhout	(Belgium) Jolien Verschueren
