= Nationale Cyclo-Cross Otegem =

Cyclo-cross race held in Otegem, Belgium

- Poster to the 2024 edition

Race details
- Date: January
- Region: Otegem, Belgium
- Local name: Cyclocross Otegem
- Discipline: Cyclo-cross
- Type: one-day

History (men)
- First edition: 1969
- Editions: 55 (as of 2026)
- First winner: Albert Van Damme (BEL)
- Most wins: Mathieu van der Poel (NED) (5 wins)
- Most recent: Toon Aerts (BEL)

History (women)
- First edition: 2013
- Editions: 12 (as of 2026)
- First winner: Marianne Vos (NED)
- Most wins: Sanne Cant (BEL); (3 wins)
- Most recent: Marion Norbert-Riberolle (BEL)

The Nationale Cyclo-Cross Otegem ("Weversmisdagcross") is a cyclo-cross race held in Otegem, Belgium. It's traditionally held the Monday after the Belgian national championships. It is a stand-alone race not part of any classification series.

== Past winners ==
=== Men ===
| Year | Winner |
|---|---|
| 2026 | (Belgium) Toon Aerts |
| 2025 | (Belgium) Toon Aerts |
| 2024 | (Belgium) Eli Iserbyt |
| 2023 | (Belgium) Laurens Sweeck |
| 2021-2022 | not held due to the COVID-19 pandemic in Belgium |
| 2020 | (Netherlands) Mathieu van der Poel |
| 2019 | (Netherlands) Mathieu van der Poel |
| 2018 | (Netherlands) Mathieu van der Poel |
| 2017 | (Netherlands) Mathieu van der Poel |
| 2016 | (Netherlands) Mathieu van der Poel |
| 2015 | (Belgium) Kevin Pauwels |
| 2014 | (Belgium) Wout Van Aert |
| 2013 | (Belgium) Klaas Vantornout |
| 2012 | (Belgium) Kevin Pauwels |
| 2011 | (Belgium) Kevin Pauwels |
| 2010 | (Belgium) Klaas Vantornout |
| 2009 | (Belgium) Niels Albert |
| 2008 | (Belgium) Sven Nys |
| 2007 | (Belgium) Sven Nys |
| 2006 | (Belgium) Sven Vanthourenhout |
| 2005 | (Belgium) Sven Vanthourenhout |
| 2004 | (Belgium) Sven Vanthourenhout |
| 2003 | (Belgium) Bart Wellens |
| 2002 | (Belgium) Erwin Vervecken |
| 2001 | (Belgium) Erwin Vervecken |
| 2000 | (Belgium) Bart Wellens |
| 1999 | (Belgium) Sven Nys |
| 1998 | (Belgium) Sven Nys |
| 1997 | (Belgium) Marc Janssens |
| 1996 | (Belgium) Paul Herygers |
| 1995 | (Belgium) Peter Willemsens |
| 1994 | (Belgium) Danny De Bie |
| 1993 | (Belgium) Alex Moonen |
| 1992 | (Belgium) Paul De Brauwer |
| 1991 | (Belgium) Johnny Blomme |
| 1990 | (Belgium) Wim Lambrechts |
| 1989 | (Belgium) Paul De Brauwer |
| 1988 | (Belgium) Alex Moonen |
| 1987 | (Belgium) Danny De Bie |
| 1986 | (Belgium) Rudy De Bie |
| 1985 | (Belgium) Paul Herygers |
| 1984 | (Belgium) Paul De Brauwer |
| 1983 | (Belgium) Johan Ghyllebert |
| 1982 | (Belgium) Johan Ghyllebert |
| 1981 | (Netherlands) Rein Groenedaal |
| 1980 | (Belgium) Johan Ghyllebert |
| 1979 | Cancelled due to the bad weather |
| 1978 | (Belgium) Leo Arnouds |
| 1977 | (Belgium) Marc De Block |
| 1976 | (Belgium) André Geirland |
| 1975 | (Belgium) André Geirland |
| 1974 | (Belgium) Roger De Vlaeminck |
| 1973 | (Belgium) Robert Vermeire |
| 1972 | (Belgium) Albert Van Damme |
| 1971 | (Belgium) Albert Van Damme |
| 1970 | (Belgium) Eric De Vlaeminck |
| 1969 | (Belgium) Albert Van Damme |

=== Women ===
| Year | Winner |
|---|---|
| 2026 | (Belgium) Marion Norbert-Riberolle |
| 2025 | (Belgium) Sanne Cant |
| 2024 | (Belgium) Marion Norbert-Riberolle |
| 2023 | (Belgium) Marion Norbert-Riberolle |
| 2021-2022 | not held due to the COVID-19 pandemic in Belgium |
| 2020 | (Belgium) Alicia Franck |
| 2019 | (Netherlands) Denise Betsema |
| 2018 | (Belgium) Sanne Cant |
| 2017 | (Luxembourg) Christine Majerus |
| 2016 | (Belgium) Jolien Verschueren |
| 2015 | (Belgium) Sanne Cant |
| 2014 | (United Kingdom) Helen Wyman |
| 2013 | (Netherlands) Marianne Vos |
