= 2016 UCI Cyclo-cross World Championships =

Cyclo-cross championship

- Venue: Heusden-Zolder, Belgium
- Date: 30–31 January 2016
- Coordinates: 51°03′N 05°17′E
- Events: 5

The 2016 UCI Cyclo-cross World Championships was the World Championship for cyclo-cross for the season 2015–16. It was held in Heusden-Zolder in Belgium on Saturday 30th and Sunday 31 January 2016. The championships featured five events, in addition to the men's and women's elite races there was a U23 men's and junior men's races, and for the first time, a U23 women's race.

== Mechanical doping ==
Almost six years since the first allegations of “mechanical doping” in cycling the UCI, during the Women's under-23 race, for the first time in cycling history found evidence of technological fraud when they checked the bicycle of Femke Van den Driessche. The UCI had been testing a new detection system. The offence carries a minimum six-month suspension and a fine of between 20,000 and 200,000 Swiss francs.

== Medal summary ==
=== Medalists ===
Event	Gold		Silver		Bronze	
Men's events
Men's elite race	Wout Van Aert; Belgium	1h 05' 52"	Lars van der Haar; Netherlands	+5"	Kevin Pauwels; Belgium	+35"
Men's under-23 race	Eli Iserbyt; Belgium	51' 18"	Adam Ťoupalík; Czech Republic	+1"	Quinten Hermans; Belgium	+5"
Men's junior race	Jens Dekker; Netherlands	43' 05"	Mickael Crispin; France	+ 35"	Thomas Bonnet; France	+ 1' 00"
Women's events
Women's elite race	Thalita de Jong; Netherlands	41' 03"	Caroline Mani; France	+ 14"	Sanne Cant; Belgium	+ 24"
Women's under-23 race	Evie Richards; Great Britain	41' 34"	Nikola Nosková; Czech Republic	+ 35"	Maud Kaptheijns; Netherlands	+ 47"

=== Medal table ===
* Host nation (Belgium)

Rank	Nation	Gold	Silver	Bronze	Total
1	Netherlands (NED)	2	1	1	4
2	Belgium (BEL)	2	0	3	5
3	Great Britain (GBR)	1	0	0	1
4	France (FRA)	0	2	1	3
5	Czech Republic (CZE)	0	2	0	2
Totals (5 entries)		5	5	5	15

== Broadcasting ==
- beIN Sports: Andorra, France, Madagascar, Mauritius, Monaco, France overseas, PAN Middle-East
- Globosat: Brazil
- NOS: the Netherlands
- Rogers Sportsnet: Australia
- RTBF: Belgium
- TV2: Norway
- Universal: the United States
- Viasat: Denmark, Estonia, Latvia, Finland, Lithuania, Sweden
- VRT: Belgium
- news by SNTV: worldwide
- news by Perform: worldwide
