= Mosselcross =

Cyclocross world cup in Dendermonde, Belgium

Race details
- Date: October, January
- Region: Dendermonde, Belgium
- Discipline: Cyclo-cross
- Competition: UCI Cyclo-cross World Cup, HG Cross
- Type: one-day
- Web site: www.mosselcross.be

History (men)
- First edition: 2018
- Editions: 8 (as of 2026)
- First winner: Mathieu van der Poel (NED)
- Most wins: Wout van Aert (BEL); (3 wins)
- Most recent: Michael Vanthourenhout (BEL)

History (women)
- First edition: 2018
- Editions: 8 (as of 2026)
- First winner: Denise Betsema (NED)
- Most wins: Lucinda Brand (NED); (4 wins)
- Most recent: Lucinda Brand (NED)

The Mosselcross race, previously called Ambiancecross or Ambiancecross Dendermonde, is a cyclo-cross race held in Dendermonde, Belgium. The race has been held since 2018 and is currently part of the HG Cross series. From 2020 to 2025 it was part of the UCI Cyclo-cross World Cup. The race is held on a usually muddy course just outside the village of Grembergen in the municipality of Dendermonde.

== History ==
The Mosselcross was first held in 2018 in Wachtebeke, which had previously been the location of the Belgian National Cyclo-cross Championships in 2005. The race was organised by Jurgen Mettepenningen who was also the team manager of the UCI continental cycling team Pauwels Sauzen–Bingoal. In 2020 the race moved from Wachtebeke some 30 kilometers further to Dendermonde and became part of the UCI Cyclo-cross World Cup. However the first edition, in December 2020, had to be held without spectators due to COVID-19 pandemic; moreover, the 2020 race was also affected by the Storm Bella. The 2021 world cup race was held once more without spectators due to COVID-19 pandemic. In 2022 there was no race but in 2023 it was back as part of the world cup.

Former World Cup logo of the race

In 2026, Borremans, a fish wholesaler in Berlare, took over title sponsorship of the event, renaming it Mosselcross and awarding 100 kilograms (220 lb) of mussels to the men's and women's elite race winners.

== Past winners ==
=== Elite Men ===
Season	Series	Winner	Second	Third
2026–2027	HG Cross	Michael Vanthourenhout (BEL)	Yordi Corsus (BEL)	Gerben Kuypers (BEL)
2025–2026	World Cup	Thibau Nys (BEL)	Tibor Del Grosso (NED)	Laurens Sweeck (BEL)
2024–2025	World Cup	Wout van Aert (BEL)	Emiel Verstrynge (BEL)	Joran Wyseure (BEL)
2023–2024	World Cup	Pim Ronhaar (NED)	Lars van der Haar (NED)	Laurens Sweeck (BEL)
2021–2022	World Cup	Wout van Aert (BEL)	Mathieu van der Poel (NED)	Toon Aerts (BEL)
2020–2021	World Cup	Wout van Aert (BEL)	Mathieu van der Poel (NED)	Toon Aerts (BEL)
2019–2020	stand-alone race	Mathieu van der Poel (NED)	Tim Merlier (BEL)	Quinten Hermans (BEL)
2018–2019	stand-alone race	Mathieu van der Poel (NED)	Michael Vanthourenhout (BEL)	Wout van Aert (BEL)

=== Elite Women ===
Season	Series	Winner	Second	Third
2026–2027	HG Cross	Lucinda Brand (NED)	Ceylin del Carmen Alvarado (NED)	Denise Betsema (NED)
2025–2026	World Cup	Lucinda Brand (NED)	Puck Pieterse (NED)	Amandine Fouquenet (FRA)
2024–2025	World Cup	Lucinda Brand (NED)	Puck Pieterse (NED)	Fem van Empel (NED)
2023–2024	World Cup	Ceylin del Carmen Alvarado (NED)	Lucinda Brand (NED)	Zoe Bäckstedt (GBR)
2021–2022	World Cup	Lucinda Brand (NED)	Clara Honsinger (USA)	Denise Betsema (NED)
2020–2021	World Cup	Lucinda Brand (NED)	Clara Honsinger (USA)	Ceylin del Carmen Alvarado (NED)
2019–2020	stand-alone race	Yara Kastelijn (NED)	Sanne Cant (BEL)	Laura Verdonschot (BEL)
2018–2019	stand-alone race	Denise Betsema (NED)	Alice Maria Arzuffi (ITA)	Annemarie Worst (NED)
