= HG Cross =

Belgian cyclo-cross competition

Race details
- Date: October–February
- Region: Belgium and the Netherlands
- Discipline: Cyclo-cross
- Web site: hgcross.be

History
- First edition: 2016–2017

The HG Cross is a season-long cyclo-cross competition consisting of 7 rounds between October and February in Belgium and the Netherlands. It is one of five season-long cyclo-cross series, alongside the UCI Cyclo-cross World Cup, Cyclo-cross Superprestige, the X²O Badkamers Trophy and the HSF System Cup. In contrast to the other competitions, the HG Cross does not award points or compose an overall ranking, but rather consists of separate races.

From 2022 to 2026, the competition was named Exact Cross

In August 2026, the series announced Dutch company HG (cleaning products) as its new title sponsor. Previous title sponsors were hardware chain Brico (2016-2019), insurance company Ethias (2019-2022), and enterprise software provider Exact (2022-2026).

== Individual race winners ==
=== 2026–27 HG Cross ===
7 races
Venue	Women	Men
Dendermonde	Lucinda Brand (NED)	Michael Vanthourenhout (BEL)
Meulebeke	Marie Schreiber (LUX)	Michael Vanthourenhout (BEL)
Heerderstrand	Ceylin del Carmen Alvarado (NED)	Joran Wyseure (BEL)
Lokeren
Mol
Maldegem
Sint-Niklaas

=== 2025–26 Exact Cross ===
7 races
Venue	Women	Men
Meulebeke	Inge van der Heijden (NED)	Joran Wyseure (BEL)
Essen	Lucinda Brand (NED)	Toon Vandebosch (BEL)
Heerderstrand	Fem van Empel (NED)	Joris Nieuwenhuis (NED)
Kortrijk	Inge van der Heijden (NED)	Niels Vandeputte (BEL)
Mol	C. del Carmen Alvarado (NED)	Mathieu van der Poel (NED)
Maldegem	Marie Schreiber (LUX)	Niels Vandeputte (BEL)
Sint-Niklaas	Lucinda Brand (NED)	Niels Vandeputte (BEL)

=== 2024–25 Exact Cross ===
7 races
Venue	Women	Men
Beringen	Fem van Empel (NED)	Lars van der Haar (NED)
Essen	Marion Norbert-Riberolle (BEL)	Laurens Sweeck (BEL)
Heerderstrand	C. del Carmen Alvarado (NED)	Eli Iserbyt (BEL)
Kortrijk	Fem van Empel (NED)	Eli Iserbyt (BEL)
Loenhout	Marion Norbert-Riberolle (BEL)	Mathieu van der Poel (NED)
Maldegem	Marie Schreiber (LUX)	Laurens Sweeck (BEL)
Sint-Niklaas	Lucinda Brand (NED)	Niels Vandeputte (BEL)

=== 2023–24 Exact Cross ===
7 races
Venue	Women	Men
Beringen	Fem van Empel (NED)	Thibau Nys (BEL)
Essen	Marion Norbert-Riberolle (BEL)	Wout van Aert (BEL)
Mol	Lucinda Brand (NED)	Mathieu van der Poel (NED)
Loenhout	Sanne Cant (BEL)	Mathieu van der Poel (NED)
Zonnebeke	Marion Norbert-Riberolle (BEL)	Michael Vanthourenhout (BEL)
Maldegem	Laura Verdonschot (BEL)	Eli Iserbyt (BEL)
Sint-Niklaas	Lucinda Brand (NED)	Michael Vanthourenhout (BEL)

=== 2022–23 Exact Cross ===
8 races
Venue	Women	Men
Kruibeke	Fem van Empel (NED)	Michael Vanthourenhout (BEL)
Beringen	Fem van Empel (NED)	Eli Iserbyt (BEL)
Meulebeke	Lucinda Brand (NED)	Michael Vanthourenhout (BEL)
Essen	Aniek van Alphen (NED)	Gerben Kuypers (BEL)
Mol	Shirin van Anrooij (NED)	Wout van Aert (BEL)
Loenhout	Shirin van Anrooij (NED)	Wout van Aert (BEL)
Zonnebeke	Denise Betsema (NED)	Tim Merlier (BEL)
Sint-Niklaas	Annemarie Worst (NED)	Laurens Sweeck (BEL)

=== 2021–22 Ethias Cross ===
8 races
Venue	Women	Men
Lokeren	Denise Betsema (NED)	Eli Iserbyt (BEL)
Beringen	Yara Kastelijn (NED)	Eli Iserbyt (BEL)
Bredene	Denise Betsema (NED)	Eli Iserbyt (BEL)
Meulebeke	Sanne Cant (BEL)	Michael Vanthourenhout (BEL)
Leuven	Anna Kay (GBR)	Laurens Sweeck (BEL)
Essen	Zoe Bäckstedt (GBR)	Wout van Aert (BEL)
Maldegem	Annemarie Worst (NED)	Laurens Sweeck (BEL)
Sint-Niklaas	Lucinda Brand (NED)	Michael Vanthourenhout (BEL)

=== 2020–21 Ethias Cross ===
8 races
Venue	Women	Men
Lokeren	Aniek van Alphen (NED)	Eli Iserbyt (BEL)
Kruibeke	Lucinda Brand (NED)	Toon Aerts (BEL)
Beringen	Denise Betsema (NED)	Toon Aerts (BEL)
Leuven	C. del Carmen Alvarado (NED)	Laurens Sweeck (BEL)
Essen	Marianne Vos (NED)	Mathieu van der Poel (NED)
Bredene	Kata Blanka Vas (HUN)	Mathieu van der Poel (NED)
Eeklo	Denise Betsema (NED)	Quinten Hermans (BEL)
Sint-Niklaas	Denise Betsema (NED)	Eli Iserbyt (BEL)

=== 2019–20 Ethias Cross ===
8 races
Venue	Women	Men
Eeklo	Maud Kaptheijns (NED)	Laurens Sweeck (BEL)
Meulebeke	C. del Carmen Alvarado (NED)	Michael Vanthourenhout (BEL)
Kruibeke	Annemarie Worst (NED)	Eli Iserbyt (BEL)
Beringen	Annemarie Worst (NED)	Quinten Hermans (BEL)
Essen	Marianne Vos (NED)	Quinten Hermans (BEL)
Bredene	Sanne Cant (BEL)	Mathieu van der Poel (NED)
Maldegem	Annemarie Worst (NED)	Eli Iserbyt (BEL)
Hulst	C. del Carmen Alvarado (NED)	Eli Iserbyt (BEL)

=== 2018–19 Brico Cross ===
8 races
Venue	Women	Men
Geraardsbergen	Eva Lechner (ITA)	Lars van der Haar (NED)
Meulebeke	Sanne Cant (BEL)	Mathieu van der Poel (NED)
Ronse	Marianne Vos (NED)	Mathieu van der Poel (NED)
Lokeren	Sanne Cant (BEL)	Daan Soete (BEL)
Essen	Maud Kaptheijns (NED)	Laurens Sweeck (BEL)
Bredene	Lucinda Brand (NED)	Wout van Aert (BEL)
Maldegem	~~Denise Betsema (NED)~~	Mathieu van der Poel (NED)
Hulst	~~Denise Betsema (NED)~~	Mathieu van der Poel (NED)

=== 2017–18 Brico Cross Trophy ===
6 races
Venue	Women	Men
Eeklo	Sanne Cant (BEL)	Mathieu van der Poel (NED)
Meulebeke	Sanne Cant (BEL)	Mathieu van der Poel (NED)
Kruibeke	Katie Compton (USA)	Mathieu van der Poel (NED)
Bredene	Alice Maria Arzuffi (ITA)	Wout van Aert (BEL)
Maldegem	Marianne Vos (NED)	Laurens Sweeck (BEL)
Hulst	Laura Verdonschot (BEL)	Mathieu van der Poel (NED)

=== 2016–17 Cyclo-cross Brico Cross Trophy ===
6 races
Venue	Women	Men
Geraardsbergen	Sanne Cant (BEL)	Wout van Aert (BEL)
Meulebeke	Ellen Van Loy (BEL)	Mathieu van der Poel (NED)
Kruibeke	Jolien Verschueren (BEL)	Michael Vanthourenhout (BEL)
Bredene	Thalita de Jong (NED)	Wout van Aert (BEL)
Maldegem	Marianne Vos (NED)	Mathieu van der Poel (NED)
Hulst	Sanne Cant (BEL)	Mathieu van der Poel (NED)
