= Bredene =

- Municipality
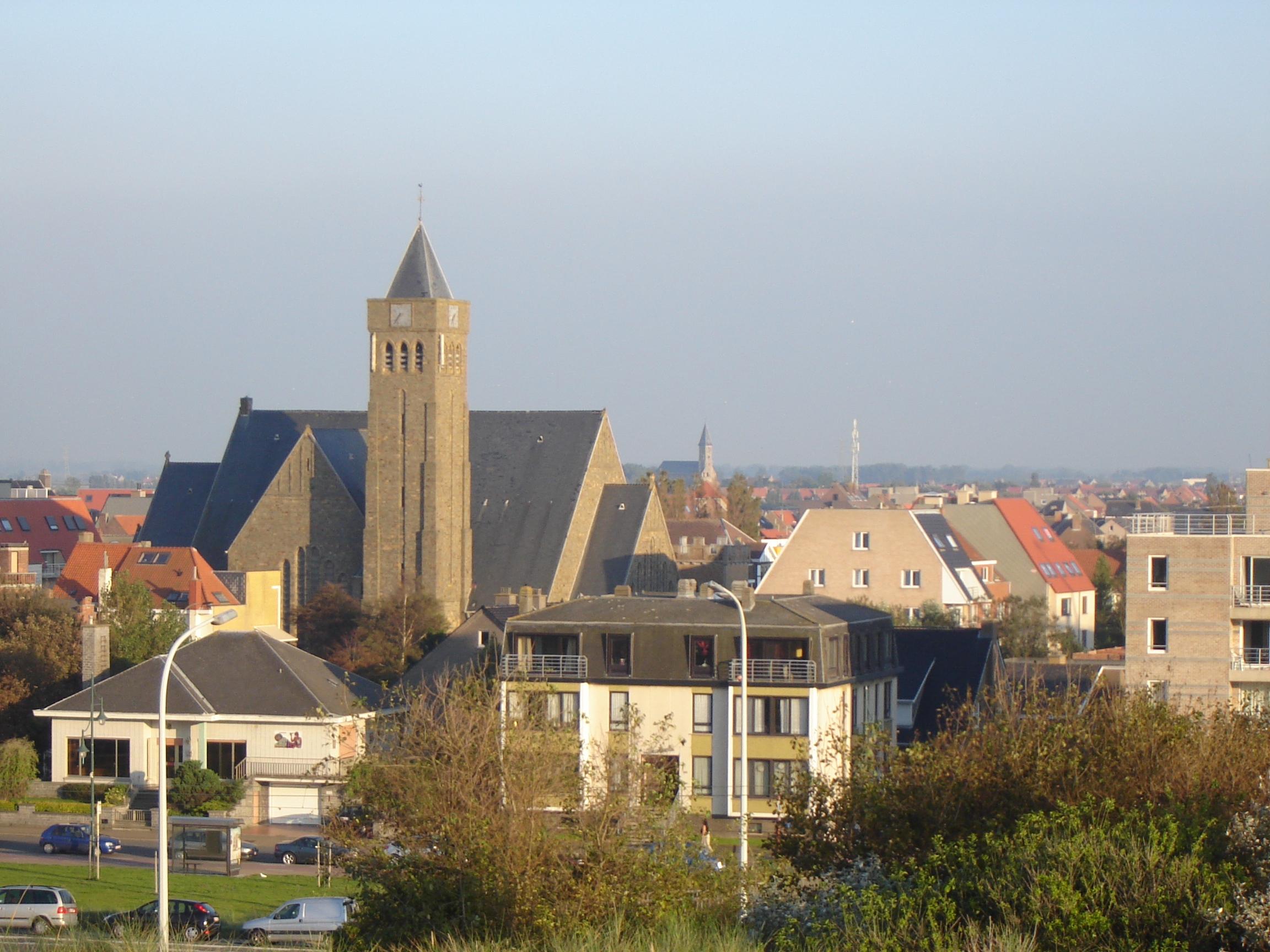

- Flag Coat of arms

- Location of Bredene in West Flanders
- Interactive map of Bredene
- Location in Belgium
- Coordinates: 51°14′N 02°58′E
- Country: Belgium
- Community: Flemish Community
- Region: Flemish Region
- Province: West Flanders
- Arrondissement: Ostend

Government
  - Mayor: Steve Vandeberghe (Vooruit)
  - Governing parties: Vooruit, CD&V

Area
  - Total: 14.25 km^{2} (5.50 sq mi)

Population (2018-01-01)
  - Total: 17,828
  - Density: 1,251/km^{2} (3,240/sq mi)
- Postal codes: 8450
- NIS code: 35002
- Area codes: 059
- Website: www.bredene.be

Bredene (Dutch pronunciation: [ˈbreːdənə]; West Flemish: Brèinienge) is a municipality located in the Belgian province of West Flanders. The municipality only comprises the town of Bredene proper. On 1 January 2006, Bredene had a total population of 15,118. The total area is 13.08 km^{2} which gives a population density of 1156 inhabitants per km^{2}.

Bredene is situated at the Belgian coast and makes its income mostly out of tourism. In the period of July and August, the population doubles due to many events that attract people from everywhere. Belgium's only nude beach is at 51°14′58″N 02°57′38″E near tram stop "Bredene Renbaan (Hippodroom)".

== Notes and references ==
- Elliott, Mark (2010). CultureShock! Belgium: A Survival Guide to Customs and Etiquette. Marshall Cavendish. ISBN 978-981-4484-25-1.
