= Vestingcross =

Cyclo-cross race

Race details
- Date: February
- Region: Zeeland, Netherlands
- Discipline: Cyclo-cross
- Competition: Brico Cross (2017-2020); World Cup (2021-)

History
- First edition: 2017
- Editions: 8 (as of 2022)
- First winner: Mathieu van der Poel (NED)
- Most wins: Mathieu van der Poel (NED) (6 wins)
- Most recent: Niels Vandeputte (BEL)

The Vestingcross is a cyclo-cross race held in Hulst, Netherlands. From 2017 to 2020 it was part of the Ethias Cross, formerly known as the Brico Cross. From the season 2020-2021 it is part of the Worldcup. Due to the COVID-19 pandemic in 2021 the race was held on an alternative location in Perkpolder and not on and around the city walls in Hulst as usual.

== Past winners ==
Year	Men's winner	Women's winner
2024	(Belgium) Niels Vandeputte	(Luxembourg) Marie Schreiber
2023	(Netherlands) Mathieu van der Poel	(Netherlands) Puck Pieterse
Nov. 2022	(Netherlands) Mathieu van der Poel	(Netherlands) Puck Pieterse
Jan. 2022	(United Kingdom) Tom Pidcock	(Netherlands) Lucinda Brand
2021	(Netherlands) Mathieu van der Poel	(Netherlands) Denise Betsema
2020	(Belgium) Eli Iserbyt	(Netherlands) Ceylin del Carmen Alvarado
2019	(Netherlands) Mathieu van der Poel	~~(Netherlands) Denise Betsema~~
2018	(Netherlands) Mathieu van der Poel	(Belgium) Laura Verdonschot
2017	(Netherlands) Mathieu van der Poel	(Belgium) Sanne Cant
