= Parkcross =

Belgian cyclo-cross race

Race details
- Date: February
- Region: Maldegem, Belgium
- Discipline: Cyclo-cross
- Competition: Exact Cross
- Type: one-day

History (men)
- First edition: 2007
- Editions: 19 (as of 2026)
- First winner: Sven Nys (BEL)
- Most wins: Sven Nys (BEL) (4 wins)
- Most recent: Niels Vandeputte (BEL)

History (women)
- First edition: 2015
- Editions: 11 (as of 2026)
- First winner: Sanne Cant (BEL)
- Most wins: Annemarie Worst (NED) (3 wins)
- Most recent: Marie Schreiber (LUX)

The Parkcross, also named Cyclocross Vossenhol-Maldegem is a cyclo-cross race held in Maldegem, Belgium. The men's race was held for the first time in 2007, the women's race in 2015. It is traditionally held on the Wednesday following the weekend of the UCI Cyclo-cross World Championships, in Sint-Annapark in the center of Maldegem. Since 2017 (except for the 2023 edition) it has been part of the Exact Cross series.

== Past winners ==
=== Men ===
Year	Men's winner
2026	Niels Vandeputte (BEL)
2025	Laurens Sweeck (BEL)
2024	Eli Iserbyt (BEL)
2023	Michael Vanthourenhout (BEL)
2022	Laurens Sweeck (BEL)
2021	not held due to the COVID-19 pandemic in Belgium
2020	Eli Iserbyt (BEL)
2019	Mathieu van der Poel (NED)
2018	Laurens Sweeck (BEL)
2017	Mathieu van der Poel (NED)
2016	Michael Vanthourenhout (BEL)
2015	Kevin Pauwels (BEL)
2014	Sven Nys (BEL)
2013	Bart Wellens (BEL)
2012	Sven Vanthourenhout (BEL)
2011	Sven Nys (BEL)
2010	Niels Albert (BEL)
2009	Sven Nys (BEL)
2008	Niels Albert (BEL)
2007	Sven Nys (BEL)

=== Women ===
Year	Women's winner
2026	Marie Schreiber (LUX)
2025	Marie Schreiber (LUX)
2024	Laura Verdonschot (BEL)
2023	Annemarie Worst (NED)
2022	Annemarie Worst (NED)
2021	not held due to the COVID-19 pandemic in Belgium
2020	Annemarie Worst (NED)
2019	~~Denise Betsema (NED)~~
2018	Marianne Vos (NED)
2017	Marianne Vos (NED)
2016	Sanne Cant (BEL)
2015	Sanne Cant (BEL)
