= Waaslandcross =

Belgian cyclo-cross race

Race details
- Date: February
- Region: Sint-Niklaas, Belgium
- English name: Cyclo-cross race of the Waasland
- Discipline: Cyclo-cross
- Competition: Exact Cross
- Type: one-day
- Web site: www.waaslandcross.be

History (men)
- First edition: 2003
- Editions: 22 (as of 2026)
- First winner: Sven Nys (BEL)
- Most wins: Sven Nys (BEL) (4 wins)
- Most recent: Niels Vandeputte (BEL)

History (women)
- First edition: 2014
- Editions: 12 (as of 2026)
- First winner: Sanne Cant (BEL)
- Most wins: Lucinda Brand (NED) (5 wins)
- Most recent: Lucinda Brand (NED)

The Waaslandcross is a cyclo-cross race held in Sint-Niklaas, Belgium. First held for men in the 2002–2003 season, it was traditionally held on 2 January. This caused troubles in the 2010–2011 season when it coincided with a cross in Tervuren, eventually leading to the cancelling of the event. The next season also did not see an edition. The event was held once again in the 2012–2013 season, this time in December. Since 2014 a race for women is organized as well. The first few editions of the cross were known as Grand Prix De Ster Sint-Niklaas or GP De Ster Sint-Niklaas.

The Waasland cross has been part of the Exact Cross series since 2021.

== Past winners ==
=== Men ===
Year	Men's winner
2026	(Belgium) Niels Vandeputte
2025	(Belgium) Niels Vandeputte
2024	(Belgium) Michael Vanthourenhout
2023	(Belgium) Laurens Sweeck
2022	(Belgium) Michael Vanthourenhout
2021	(Belgium) Eli Iserbyt
2020	not held
2019	(Netherlands) Mathieu van der Poel
2018	(Netherlands) Mathieu van der Poel
2017	(Belgium) Wout van Aert
2016	(Belgium) Tom Meeusen
2015	(Belgium) Laurens Sweeck
2014	(Netherlands) Mathieu van der Poel
2013	(Belgium) Niels Albert
2012	(Belgium) Sven Nys
2011	not held
2010	(France) Francis Mourey
2009	(Belgium) Bart Wellens
2008	(Belgium) Rob Peeters
2007	(Belgium) Sven Nys
2006	(Belgium) Sven Nys
2005	(Belgium) Tom Vannoppen
2004	(Belgium) Peter Van Santvliet
2003	(Belgium) Sven Nys

=== Women ===
Year	Women's winner
2026	(Netherlands) Lucinda Brand
2025	(Netherlands) Lucinda Brand
2024	(Netherlands) Lucinda Brand
2023	(Netherlands) Annemarie Worst
2022	(Netherlands) Lucinda Brand
2021	(Netherlands) Denise Betsema
2020	not held
2019	(Belgium) Sanne Cant
2018	(Belgium) Sanne Cant
2017	(Netherlands) Lucinda Brand
2016	(Belgium) Sanne Cant
2015	(Netherlands) Thalita de Jong
2014	(Belgium) Sanne Cant
