= Jolien Verschueren =

Belgian cyclist (1990–2021)

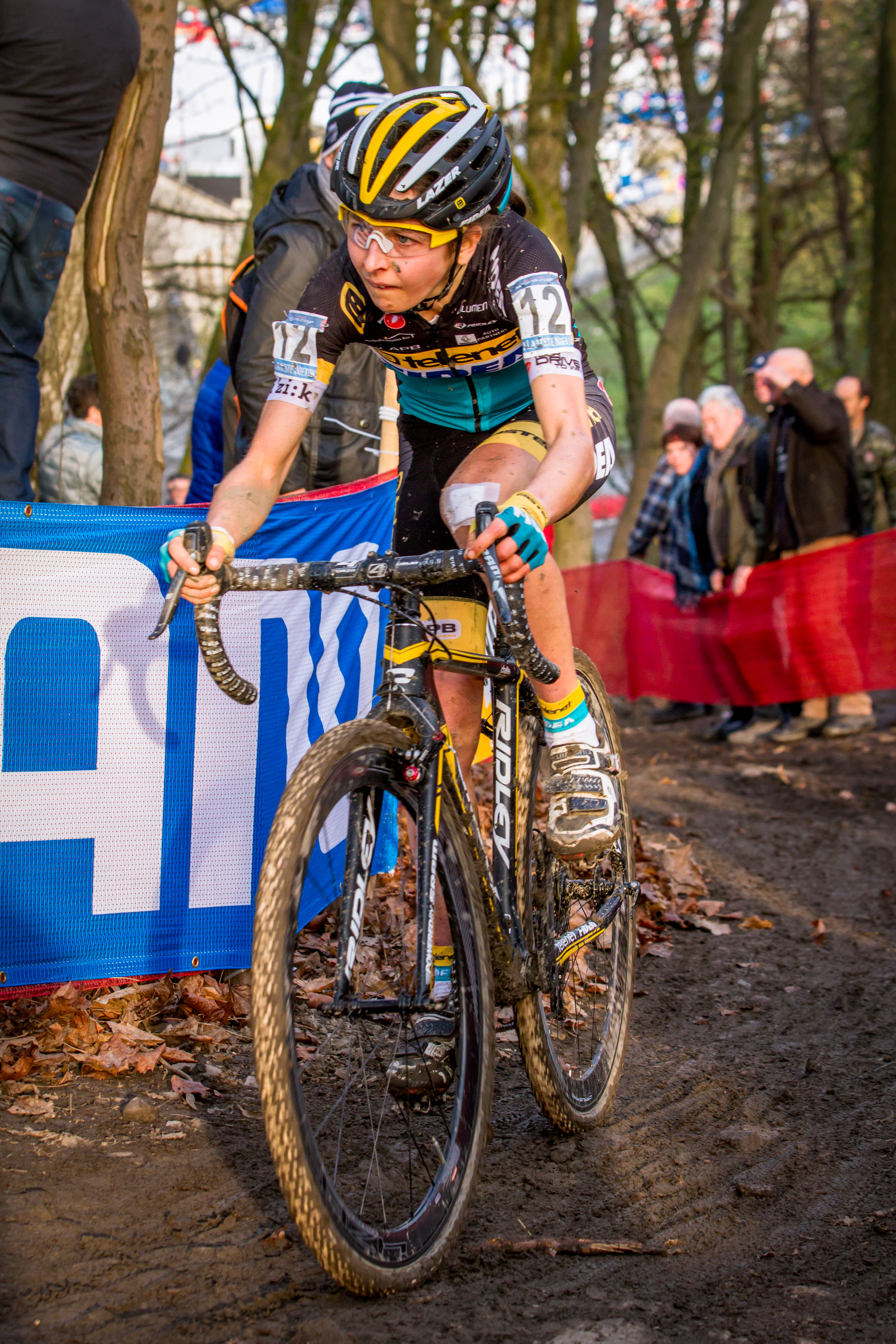
- Verschueren in 2015

Personal information
- Born: 7 May 1990 Kortrijk, Belgium
- Died: 2 July 2021 (aged 31) Kruisem, Belgium
- Height: 162 cm (5 ft 4 in)
- Weight: 46 kg (101 lb)

Cycling career
- Sport: Cycling
- Discipline: Cyclo-cross
- Role: Rider

Professional teams
- 2015–2017: Young Telenet Fidea
- 2017–2018: Pauwels Sauzen–Vastgoedservice
- 2019–2021: Pauwels Sauzen–Bingoal

Jolien Verschueren (7 May 1990 – 2 July 2021) was a Belgian cyclo-cross cyclist, who rode for UCI Cyclo-cross team Pauwels Sauzen–Altez Industriebouw Cycling Team. She represented her nation in the women's elite event at the 2016 UCI Cyclo-cross World Championships in Heusden-Zolder.

Verschueren combined her cycling career with her work as a schoolteacher. She won the Koppenbergcross in 2015 and repeated this at the 2016 DVV Verzekeringen Trofee Koppenbergcross, defeating the then world champion, Thalita de Jong. On 12 April 2018, there was an announcement that Verschueren underwent operation for a malignant brain tumor removal. Verschueren tried to comeback in 2019 and 2020 but her health limited her efforts to get good results. Her last race was the 2020 edition of the Koppenbergcross. Verschueren died of brain cancer on 2 July 2021. In October 2021, the organisers of the Koppenbergcross announced that the women's edition of the race would be known as the Grand Prix Jolien Verschueren in her memory.
