= Lokeren =

- City and municipality
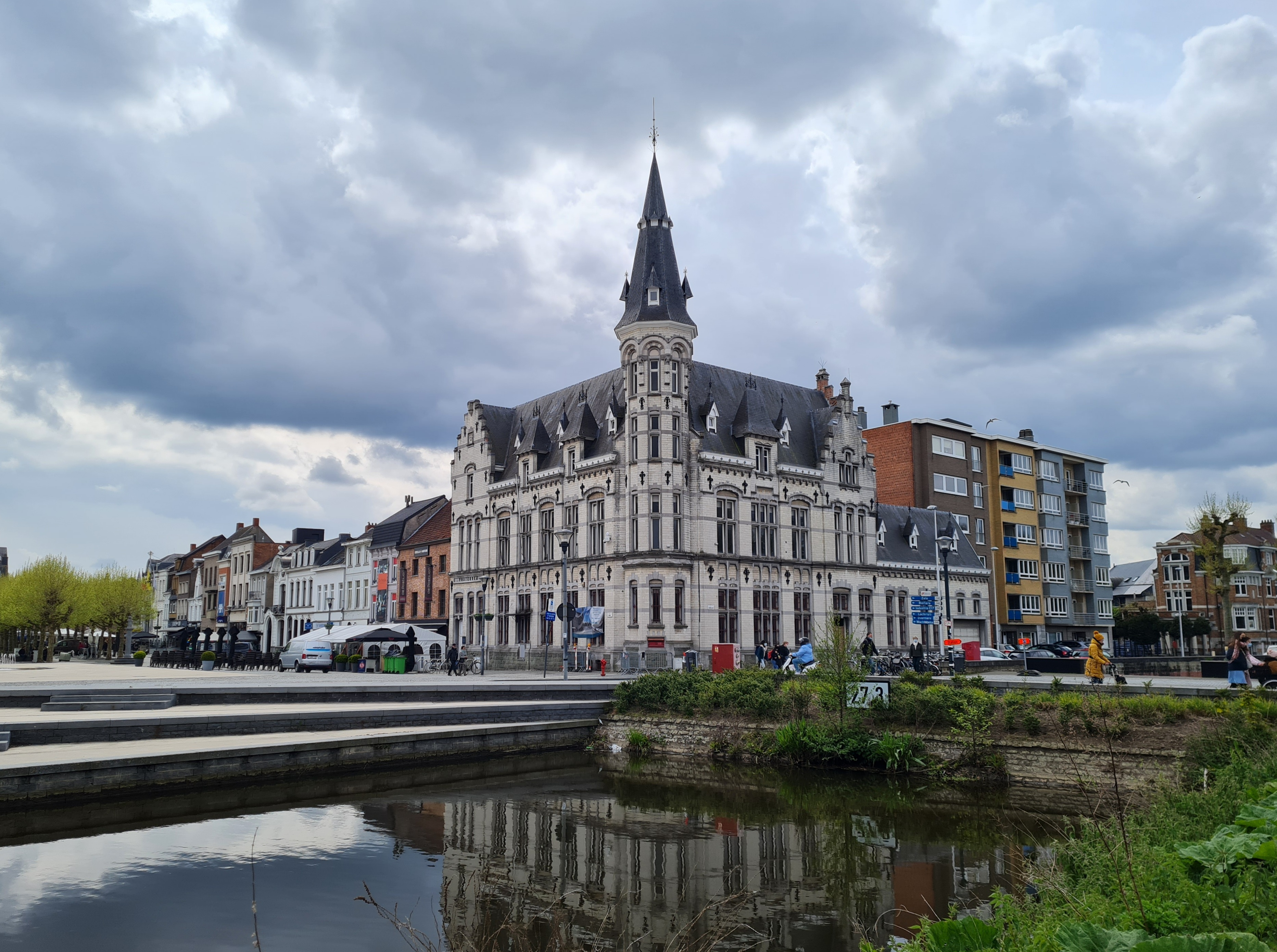
- The Old Postoffice of Lokeren

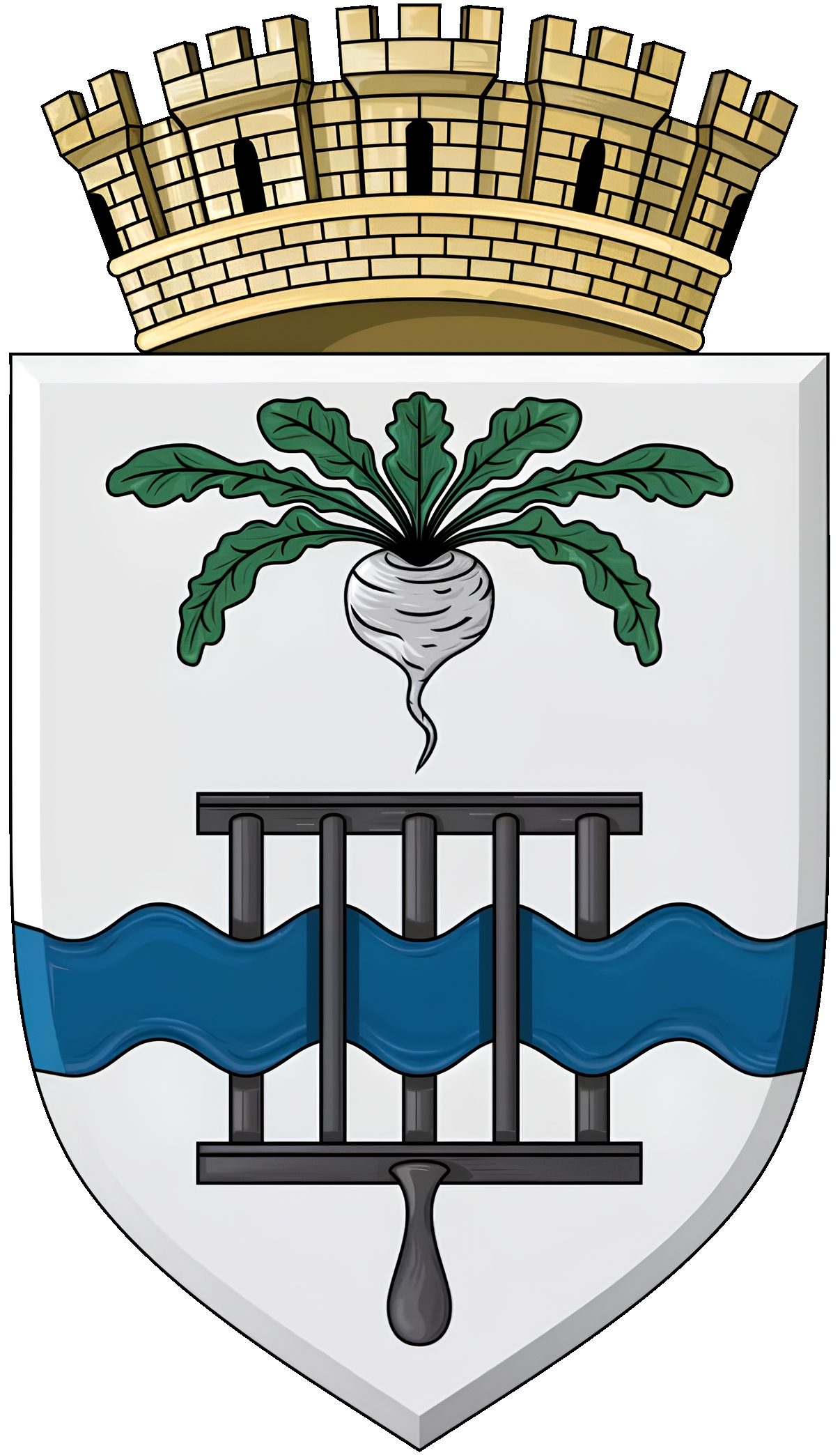
- Flag Coat of arms

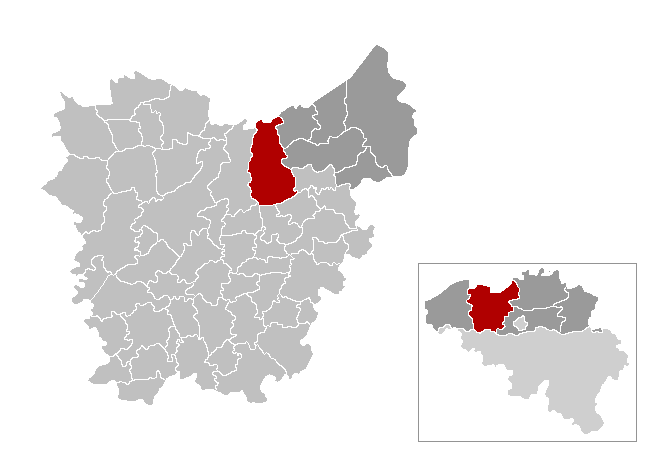
- Location of Lokeren in East Flanders
- Interactive map of Lokeren
- Location in Belgium
- Coordinates: 51°06′N 03°59′E
- Country: Belgium
- Community: Flemish Community
- Region: Flemish Region
- Province: East Flanders
- Arrondissement: Sint-Niklaas

Government
  - Mayor: Filip Anthuenis ( Open VLD)
  - Governing parties: Open VLD, CD&V

Population (2022-01-01)
  - Total: 42,703
- Postal codes: 9160
- NIS code: 46014
- Area codes: 09
- Website: www.lokeren.be

Lokeren (Dutch pronunciation: [ˈloːkərə(n)]) is a city and municipality located in the Belgian province of East Flanders, and belongs to the Waasland, also called Land van Waas, of which it is the second most important city after Sint-Niklaas. The city, located on the river Durme, the Lede, and the E17 motorway, has more than 42,100 inhabitants who are called Lokeraars or Rapenfretters. Because Lokeren is located on the Durme, Lokeren is often called "The Durme City". Horse sausages are officially recognized as a regional product.

== Toponym ==
A group of authors sees the element luken in the place name, which means (en)close or to close, to shut. Lokeren would refer to an enclosed place between the Durme and a forest area with wild animals.

According to another theory, the name Lokeren would derive from, on the one hand, the Indo-European root word leuk, which means clear or shiny, and on the other hand, the prehistoric hydronymic suffix arna, which means water. The problem with this theory is that there is no factual historical confirmation, although Leuk-arna is linguistically plausible.

== History ==
=== Origins ===
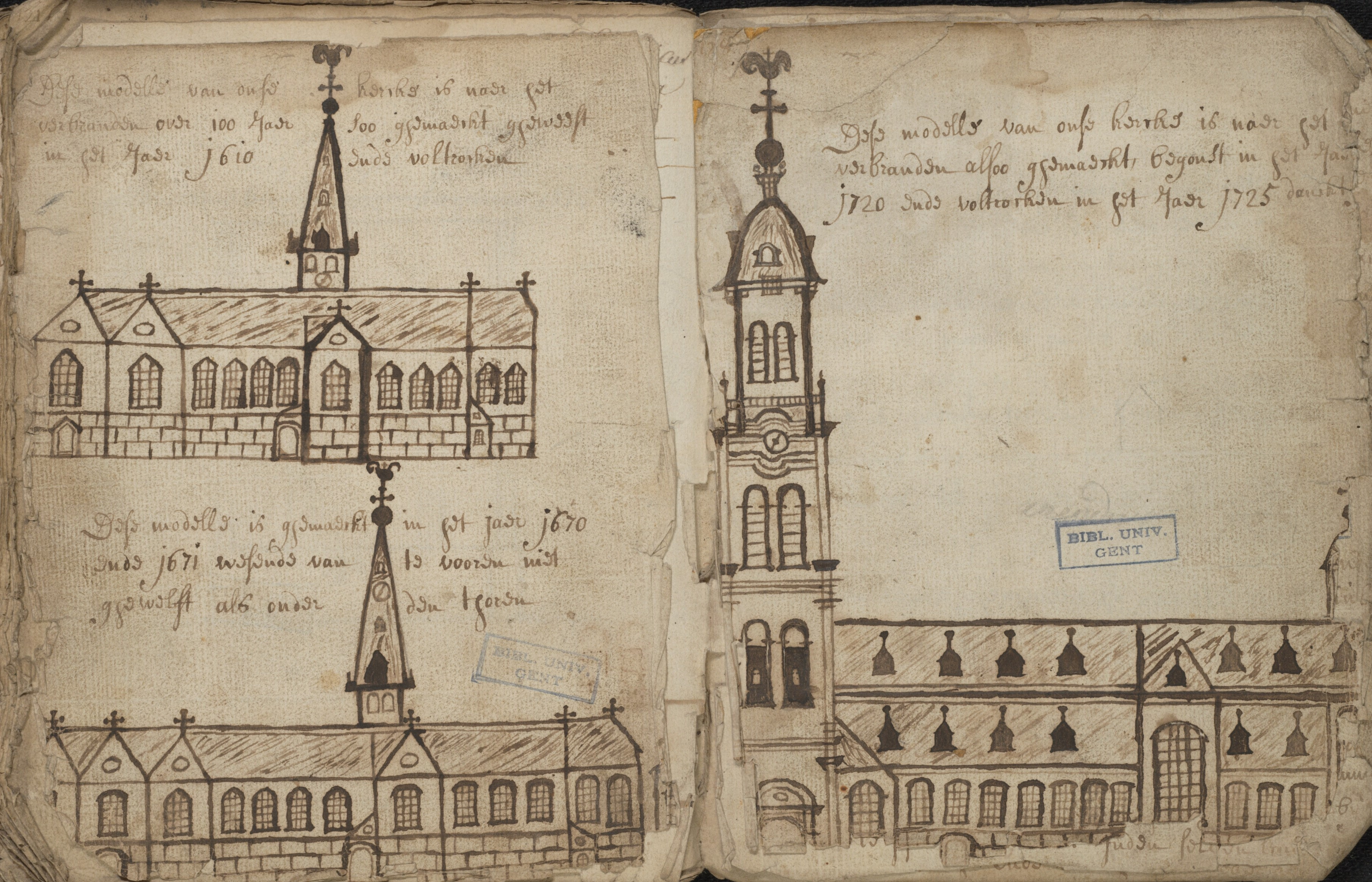
Excerpt from the manuscript of the Chronicle of Lokeren. Written by Nicolaes de Smet, 18th century.

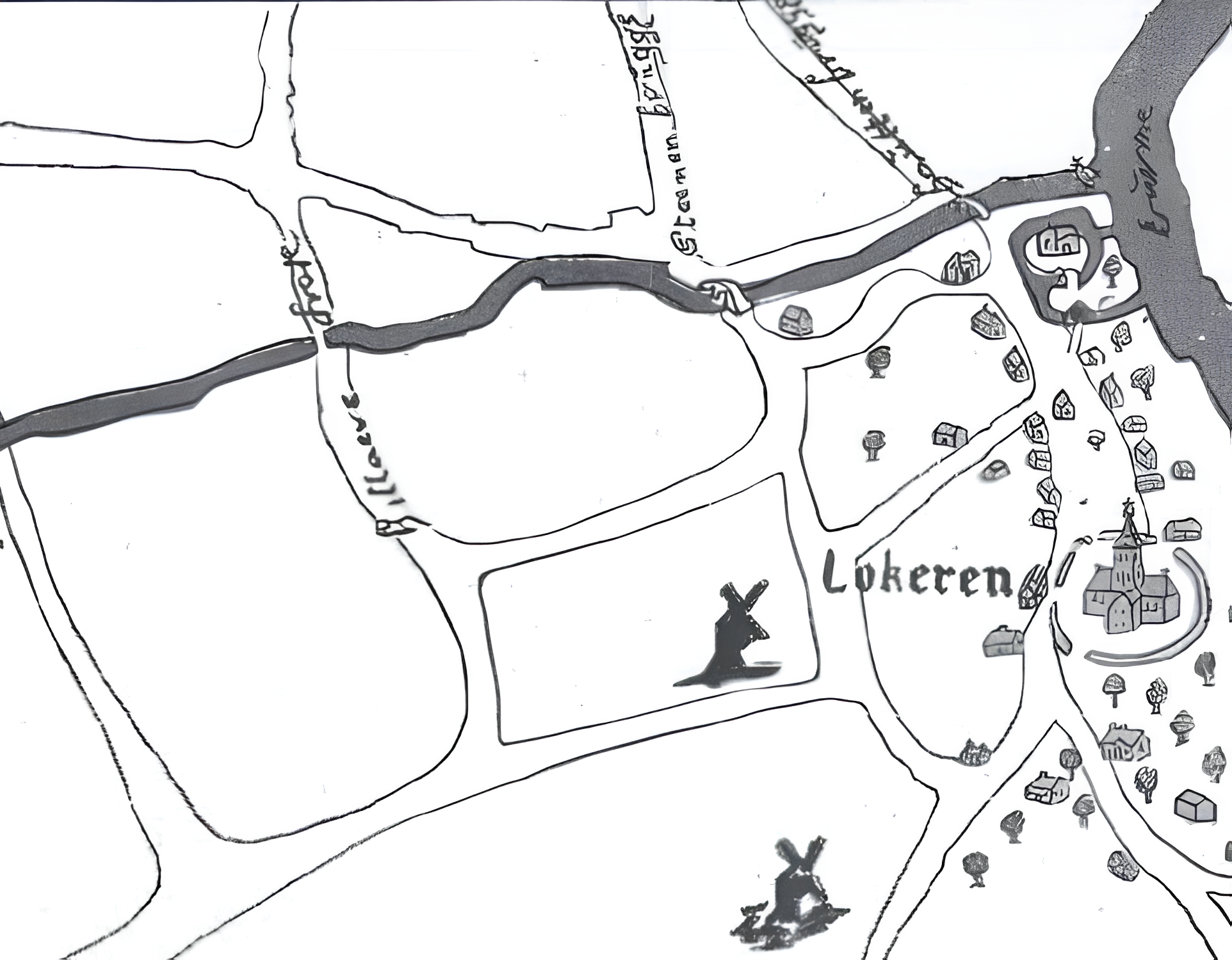
Center of Lokeren according to a 1569 sketch

Archaeological finds on the Lokeren territory prove that this area was populated in Neolithic times. A Roman road ran along the Durme river. The name Waas was given to this area by the Romans from the Germanic root Wasu meaning "marshy land". The first mention of the name Lokeren, however, dates from 1114. Unlike the older settlements, the new village came to be built on the right bank of the Durme. By the middle of the 12th century, it had become an independent parish, with agriculture and flax as the two main drivers of the economy. The textile industry would remain important until well into the 20th century.

=== 14th–16th centuries ===
Since its inception, Lokeren has been extensively connected with other settlements and places. The city center itself is in fact a major junction of regional roads connecting Lokeren with other important places. From those important roads came branches that today form the basis of the city center.

From the Middle Ages to the end of the 18th century, the territory of Lokeren fully belonged to the Count of Flanders. However, a number of parts of the city were lent by the count to powerful landowners such as the lords of Herzele, Kokelberge and the lord of Beveren who owned a piece of land on the left side of the Markt with a castle on it. This castle was demolished in the early 17th century after the lord sold the land to the city council. An important event in the 13th century was the establishment of the Cistercian nunnery on Oudenbos. During the ensuing period, the nuns of the monastery led major excavation works on lands in the vicinity of the monastery. These lands remained in the hands of the sisters until the end of the Ancien Régime. Other religious institutions, including Baudelo Abbey, Drongen Abbey and Ter Hagen Monastery, were also active on this territory during the High Middle Ages.

=== 16th–17th centuries ===
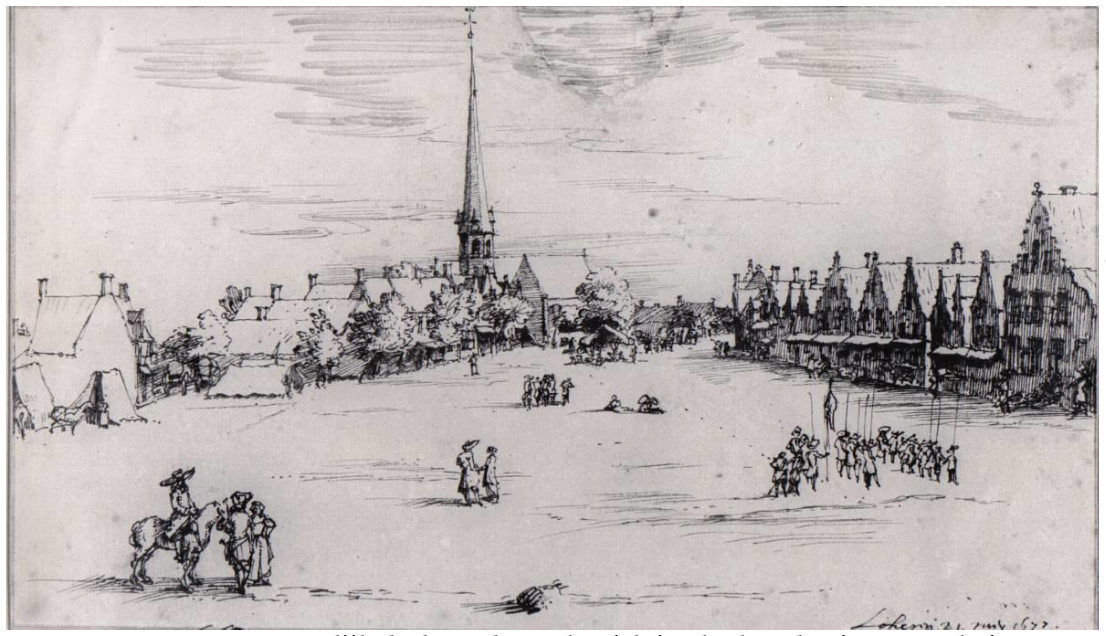
View of the southern part of Lokeren Market in 1677

In 1555, Charles V gave Lokeren the right to hold a market. In the 16th and 17th century, the whole of Waasland was in the line of fire between Protestant Netherlands and Catholic Spain, often with terrible consequences for the local population. Numerous Lokeraars were part of the immigration flow to the northern Netherlands at the end of the 16th century. The consequence of this (partial) depopulation was that many agricultural lands were no longer worked, becoming overgrown by wild vegetation. As a result, Lokeren had to contend with a real wolf plague in the 17th century. In the course of the 17th century, the city council tried to acquire plots of land adjacent to the Markt from their owners. In this way the market was eventually connected with the Durme and around 1651 it took on its more or less current contours. At the market was even a quay that went about 15 meters into the market square. After 1700 there is again talk of progress in the city. This was mainly due to the development of a new industry, hat manufacturing, for which Lokeren eventually became internationally known. Lokeren was the center of the oldest Flemish flax region, which included part of the Waasland and Dendermonde. This region supplied the best quality yarn to the Flemish weaving mill. From the 16th century until the 19th century, flax has been the raw material of the main industry of Flanders.

=== 18th–19th centuries ===
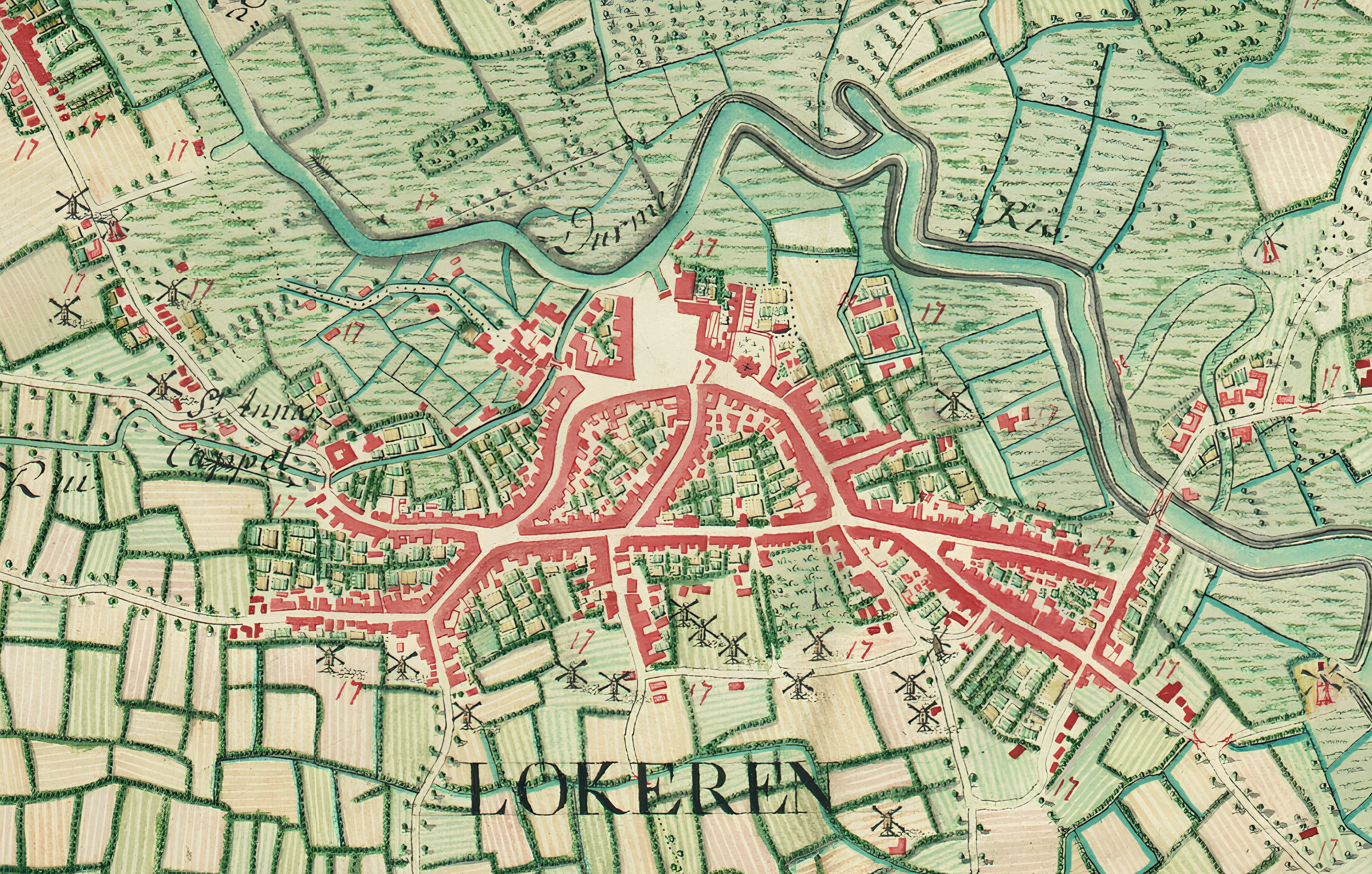
Lokeren on the Ferraris map (around 1775)

After the French Revolution, the area was made part of the new Département de l'Escaut, with Lokeren at the head of a canton. This did not last long as the department was split in 1800 and Lokeren made part of the arrondissement of Dendermonde. Napoleon Bonaparte promoted the town to the status of city in 1804.

In the 18th century, Lokeren, except for Ghent, had the most inhabitants of East Flanders, the then Département de l'Escaut. This demographic expansion was the result of the favorable economic climate. However, the population density was lower than in Sint-Niklaas, for example.

In the course of the 18th century, trade over water in Lokeren increased. As a result of this increasing practice, a meander of the Durme was cut off near the Buylaers. The muted meander is visible on the Ferraris map. In 1725 the Church of Saint Laurence was built on the Markt.

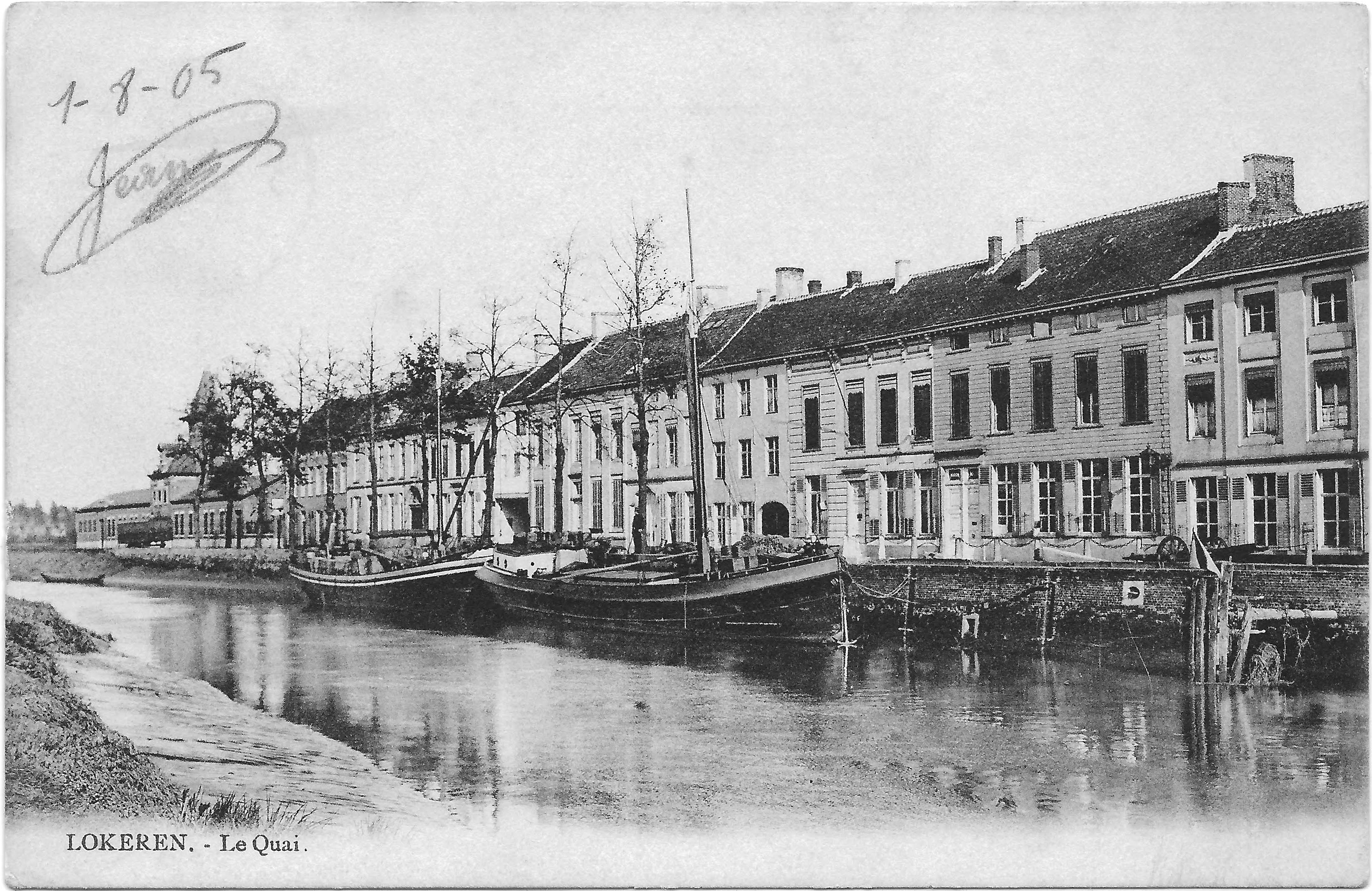
The port of Lokeren on the Grote Kaai at the end of the 19th century

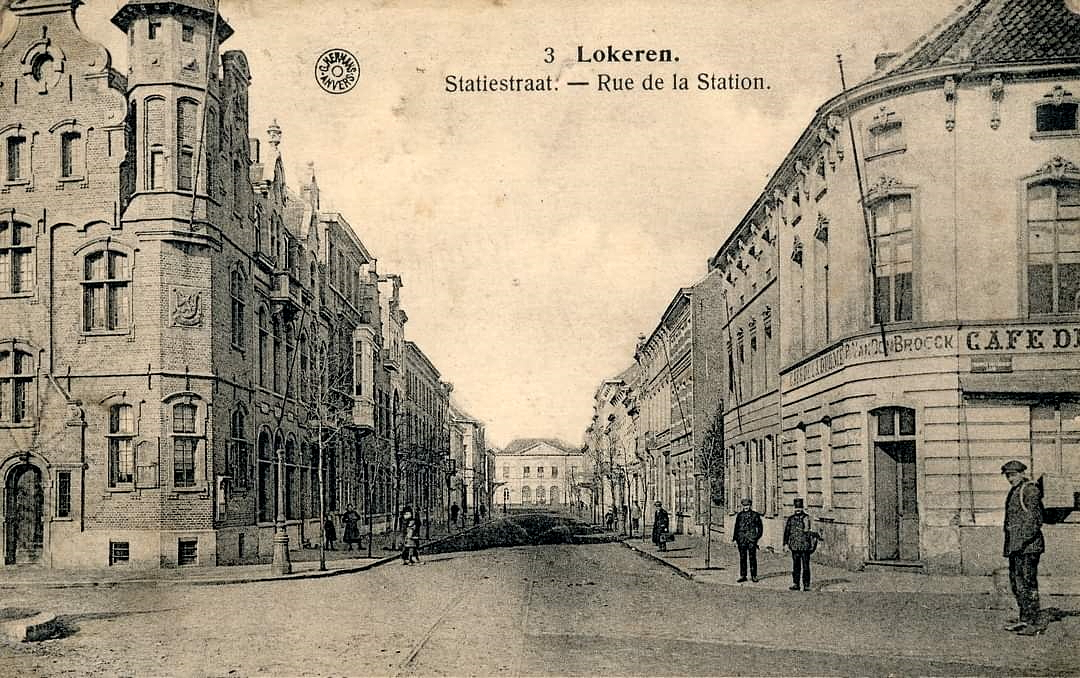
The Stationstraat with a view of the station

In December 1845, the college of aldermen asked the governor whether the city could build a station and a railway bridge over the Durme. This was necessary to create employment after the failed harvest so that the affected families could provide for themselves. The urban image of Lokeren was radically changed by the construction of a station along the Ghent-Antwerp railway. The station opened on 7 August 1847 and was located north of the Durme, in the lake area, just under 400 meters from the Markt. This station was equipped for both goods and passengers. Not much time later, the station was divided into two stations, Lokeren station and Dender & Waas station. The station building itself survived until it was destroyed during World War II.

With the opening of this station and the construction of Stationsstraat, new neighborhoods were constructed on the left bank of the Durme. In the 19th century, the hamlet of Heirburg was completely connected to the center.

In the 19th century, Lokeren was booming industrially. The industrial buildings in Lokeren were rarely larger than 4 ares. In Lokeren people did not feel compelled to build factories because the cottage industry was still sufficiently profitable. Lokeren mainly focused on conservative craft sectors: the millinery and linen bleaching. This kept the city up until the early 20th century. Larger factories were later constructed.

At the end of the 19th century, this favorable course came to an end for Lokeren. Other East Flemish cities such as Aalst and Sint-Niklaas took the lead.

=== 20th century ===
The First World War slowed the city's growth, although the city came out virtually unscathed. During the German occupation during the Second World War, a Durchgangslager (transit camp) was set up between Bleekmeerstraat and Oude Bruglaan with the main purpose of bringing English prisoners of war together awaiting their deportation. After the liberation (during the repression) this camp was set up as an internment center for collaborators. The Lokeren Internment Center (Hechteniskamp Lokeren) was one of the largest of its kind and held between 15,000 and 22,000 detainees from September 1944 to November 1947.

Lokeren experienced a rapid and stable reconstruction of the city in the post-war period. Bombed-out houses were renovated or rebuilt, and the badly damaged station was demolished and replaced by a more modern one. Many bridges over the Durme and Lede were also rebuilt. This was followed by a major expansion of the Lokeren city center, both on a residential and industrial level.

=== Industry ===
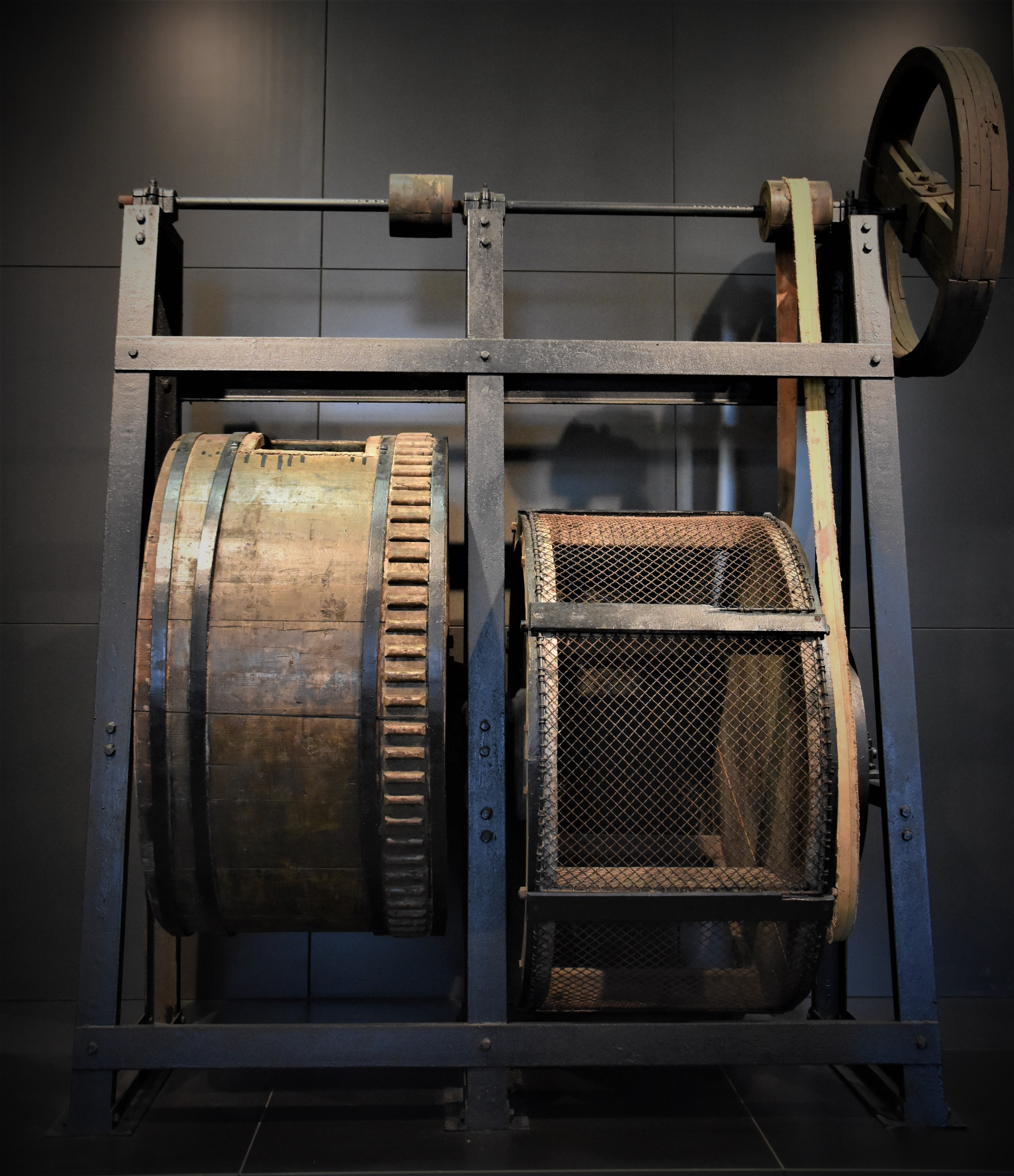
A grinder used for hair cutting

Factories in the center continued to operate until the 1980s, when it was decided that all industrial activities should be better located outside the city core. With the decline of the secondary sector from the 1950s onward, large factories in the city center such as Nijverheidstraat, Oude Durme, Hoedhaar, etc. were closed one by one.

New industrial areas were planned outside the city center at Den Oever, Rozen and Everslaar. The Lokeren-Oost freight station was also constructed and would replace the old Dender & Waas freight station. In 2018 it was announced that the Everslaer industrial park was going to be expanded. The chocolatier Callebaut bought a large piece of land where the largest chocolate warehouse in Europe would later be built. In the 1970s, the railway lines 59 and 57, which run right through the center, were laid on a viaduct. As a result, the center was divided into three parts.

=== Expansion of the city center ===
Between 1960 and 1980, Lokeren expanded its residential area further north of the center. Neighborhoods were constructed between railway lines 59 & 77A and the N70. Later, further expansion was carried out on and around the N70 and the Oude Heerweg. After the ring or N47 was built around Lokeren, the southern part of the center was further expanded. The hamlets of Spoele and Bokslaar became neighborhoods as a result. Today, these districts extend all the way to the E17, between the N47, railway line 57 and the Everslaer industrial estate. The western part of the center was also expanded, but to a lesser extent. Because of this growth, Baudouin of Belgium paid a visit to Lokeren on 10 June 1956.

Since the merger of 1 January 1977, the sub-municipalities of Eksaarde and Daknam have been part of Lokeren. Daknam and Lokeren, however, have been one administrative unit since 1794.

== Sights ==
- Lokeren counts a number of art galleries and a museum, which covers local history from prehistoric archaeology to the mid-20th century.
- Sint-Laurentius Church, built in 1725.
- Since 10 June 1956, the city has been endowed with a 49-bell carillon.
- The Molsbroek nature preservation area is on Lokeren's territory.
- The façade of the Sint-Lodewijks college, High-School.
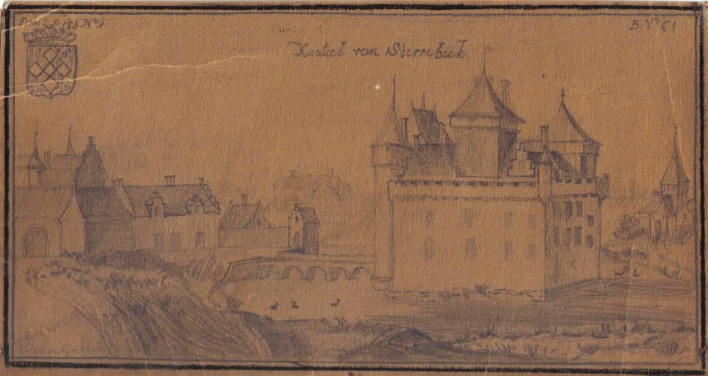
Sketch of the former Sterrebeek Castle

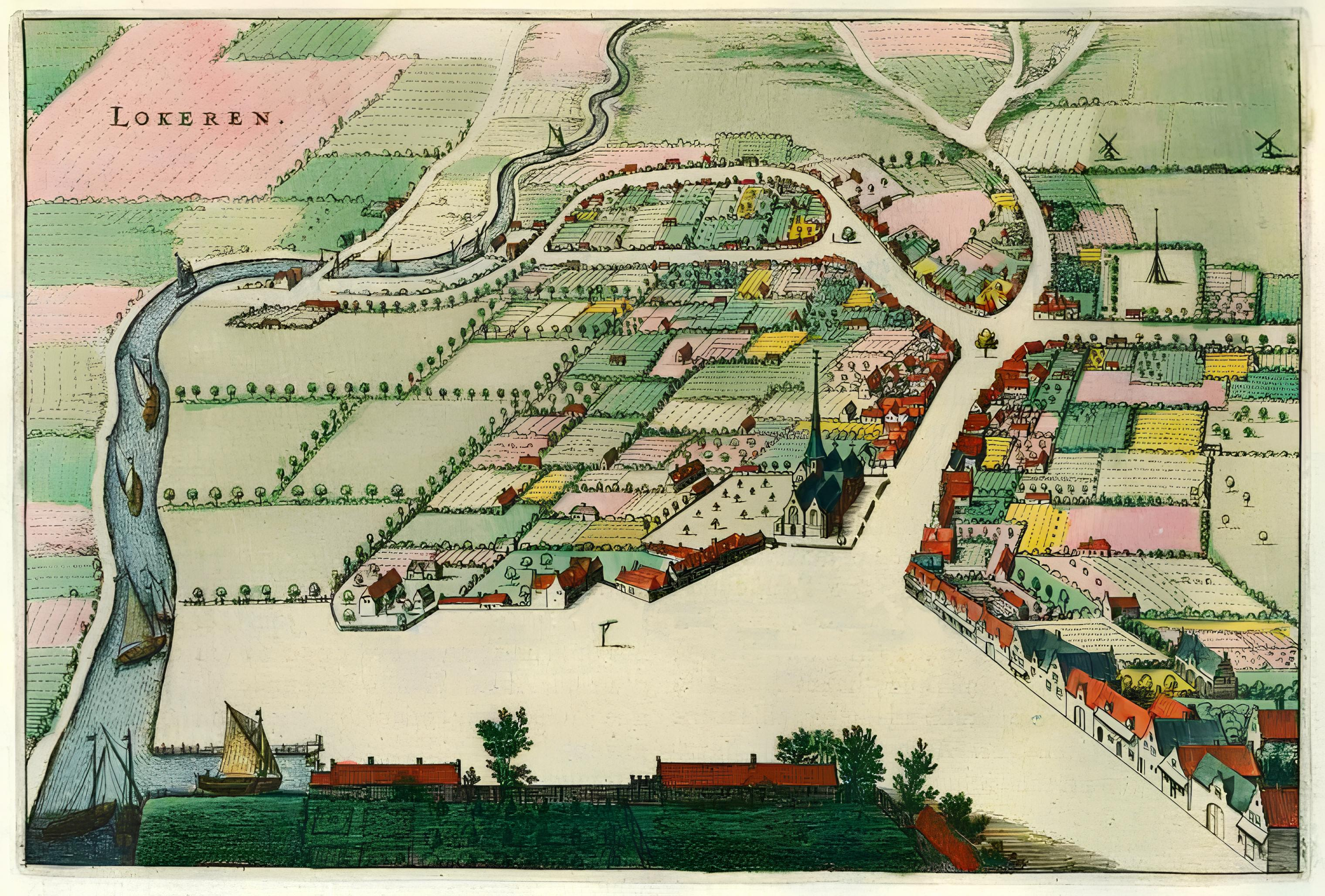
Lokeren in Flandria Illustrata (1641)

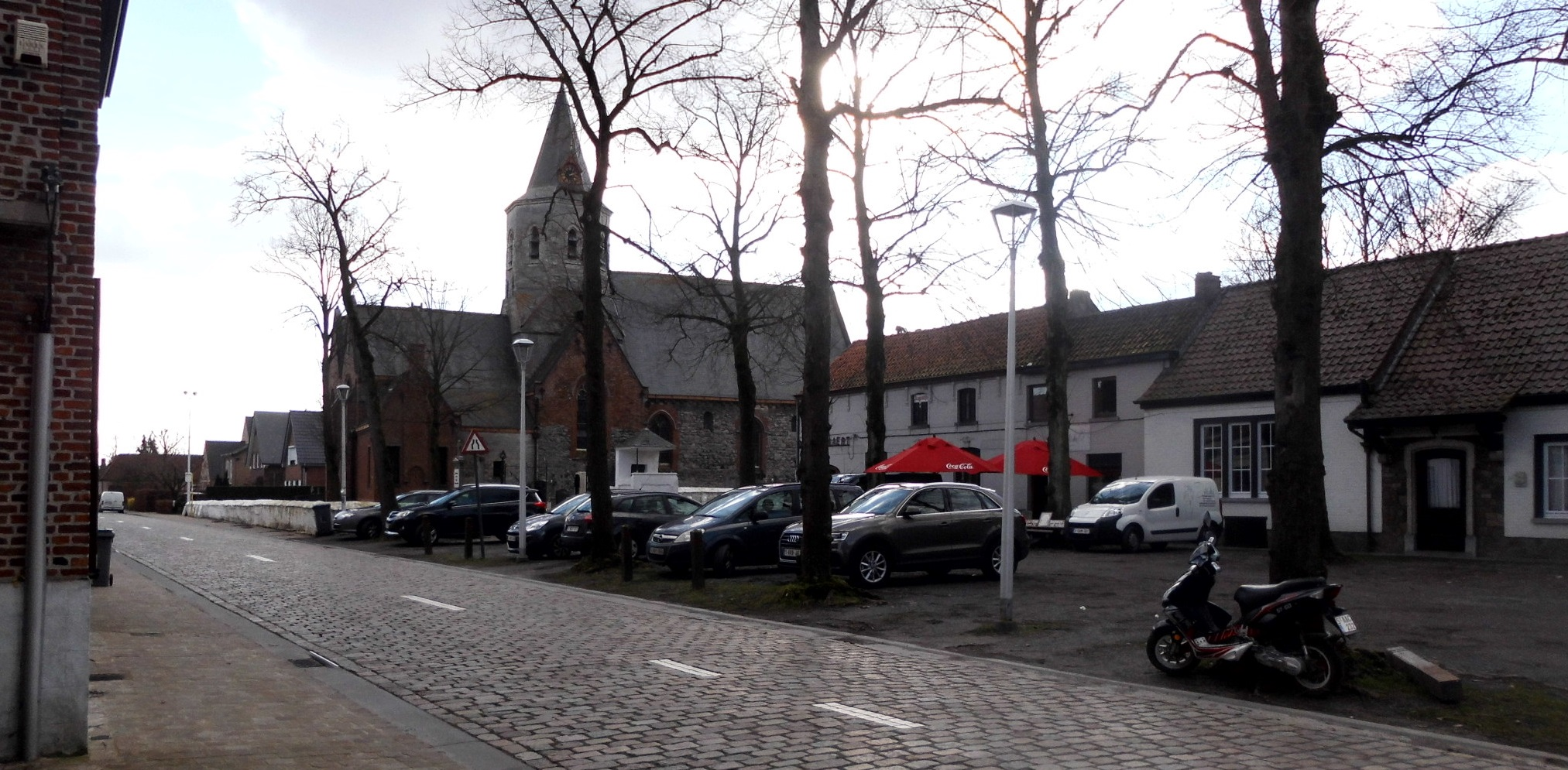
Church of Our Lady, built before 1156, with southern part added in the 15th century

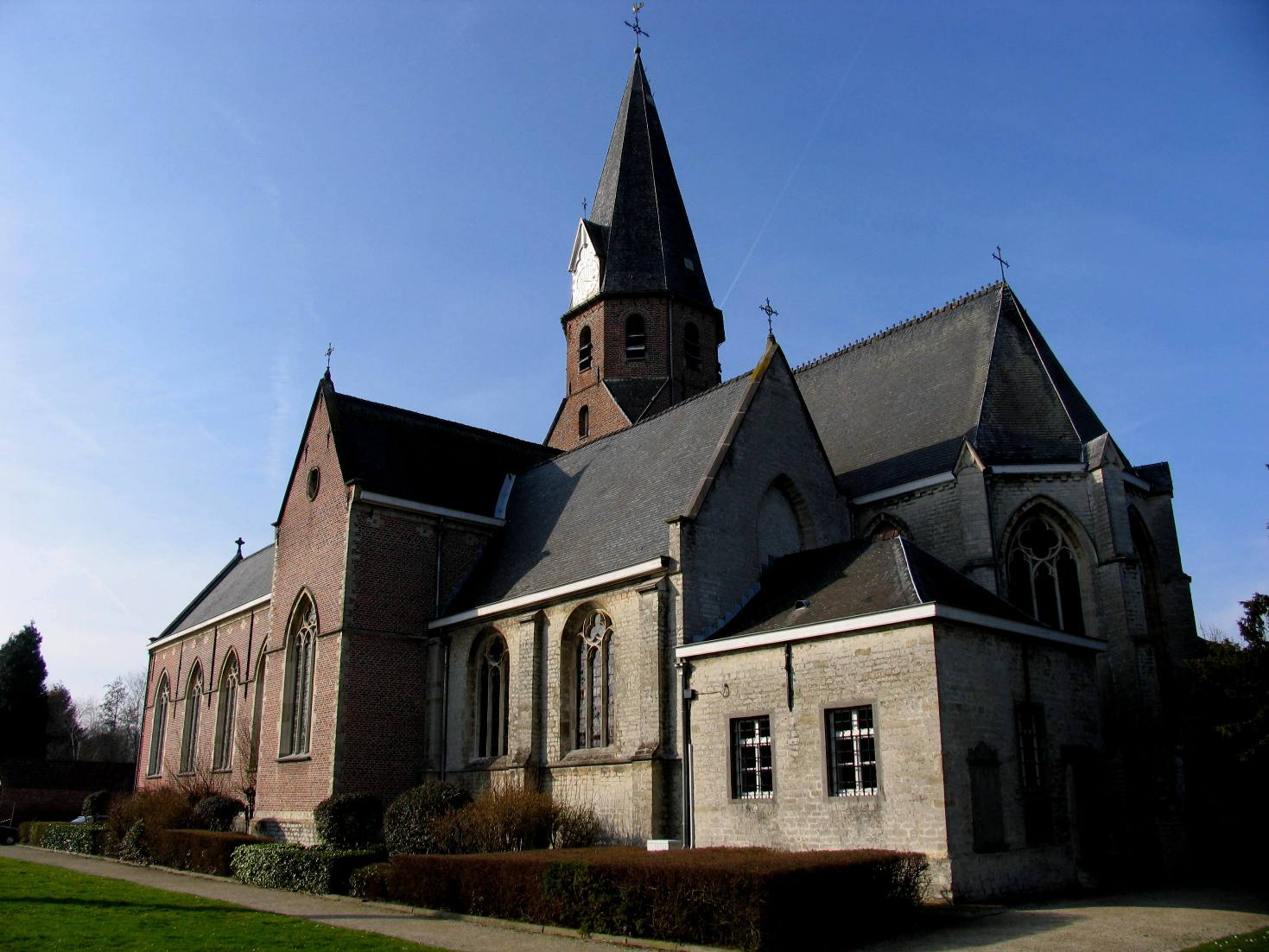
Church of the Ascension, built in 1230 and thoroughly restored in the 17th century after being badly damaged in the 1570s

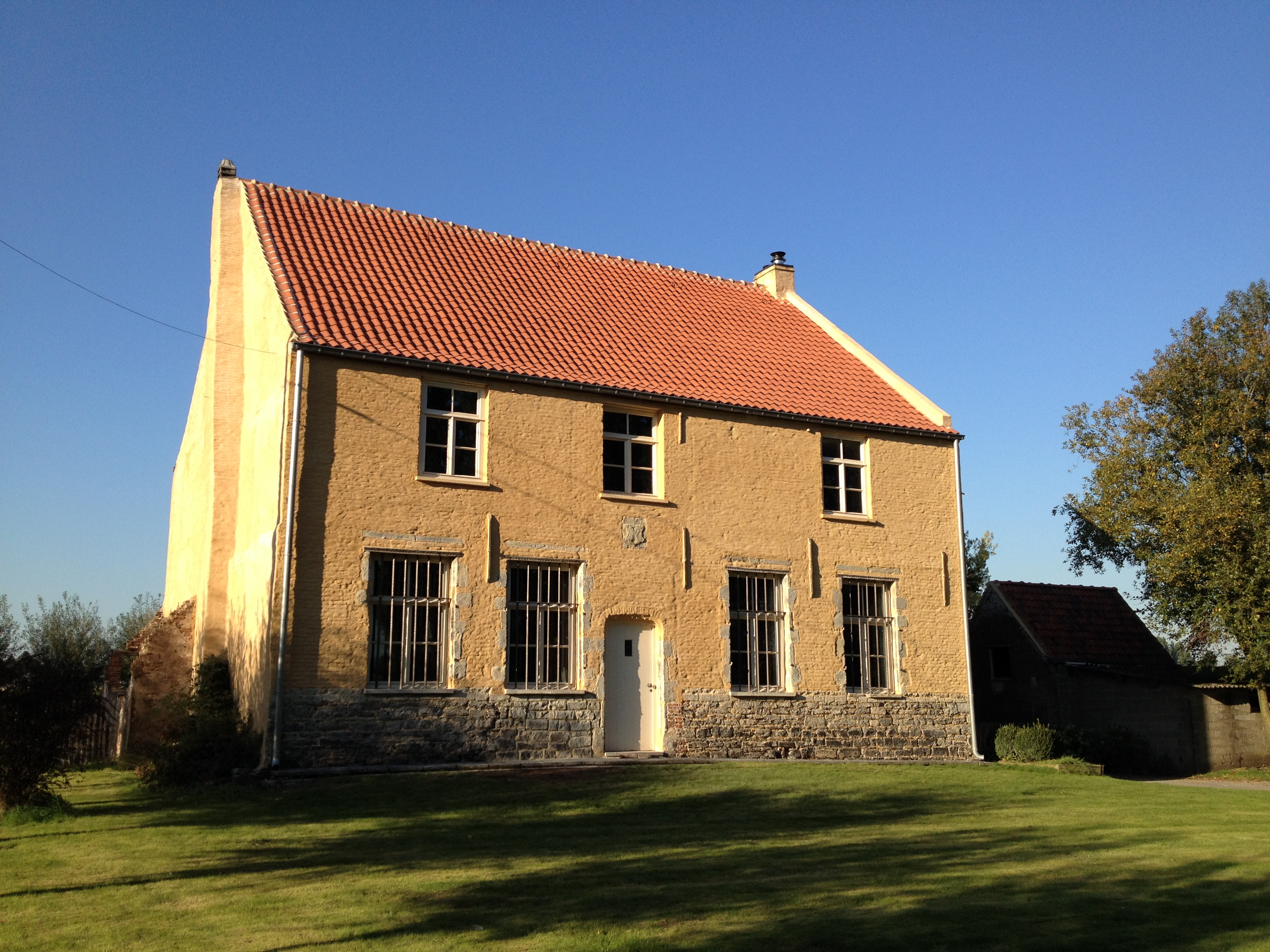
Hooghuys, built in 1568

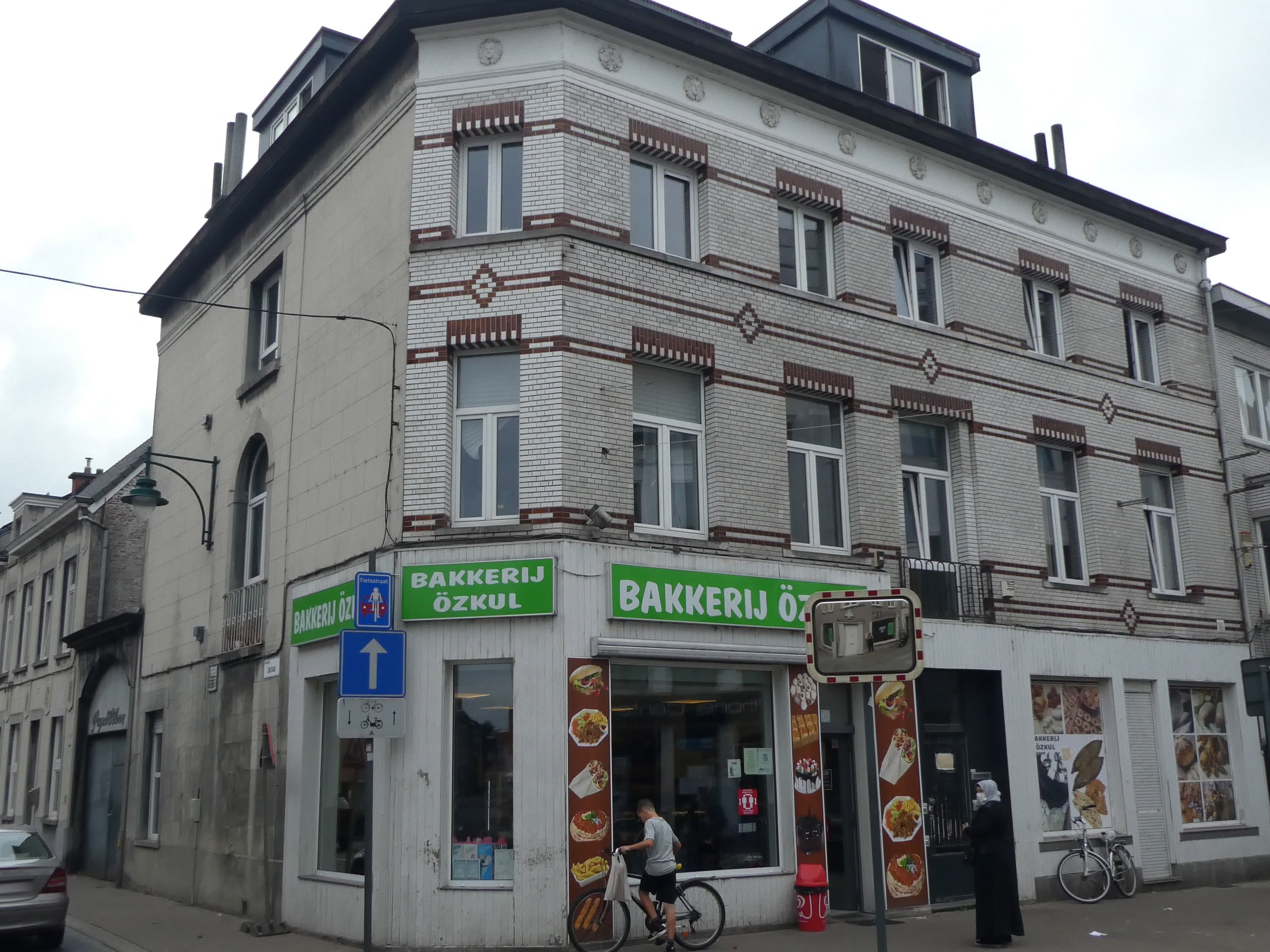
Former tavern built in 1621 on Kerkstraat

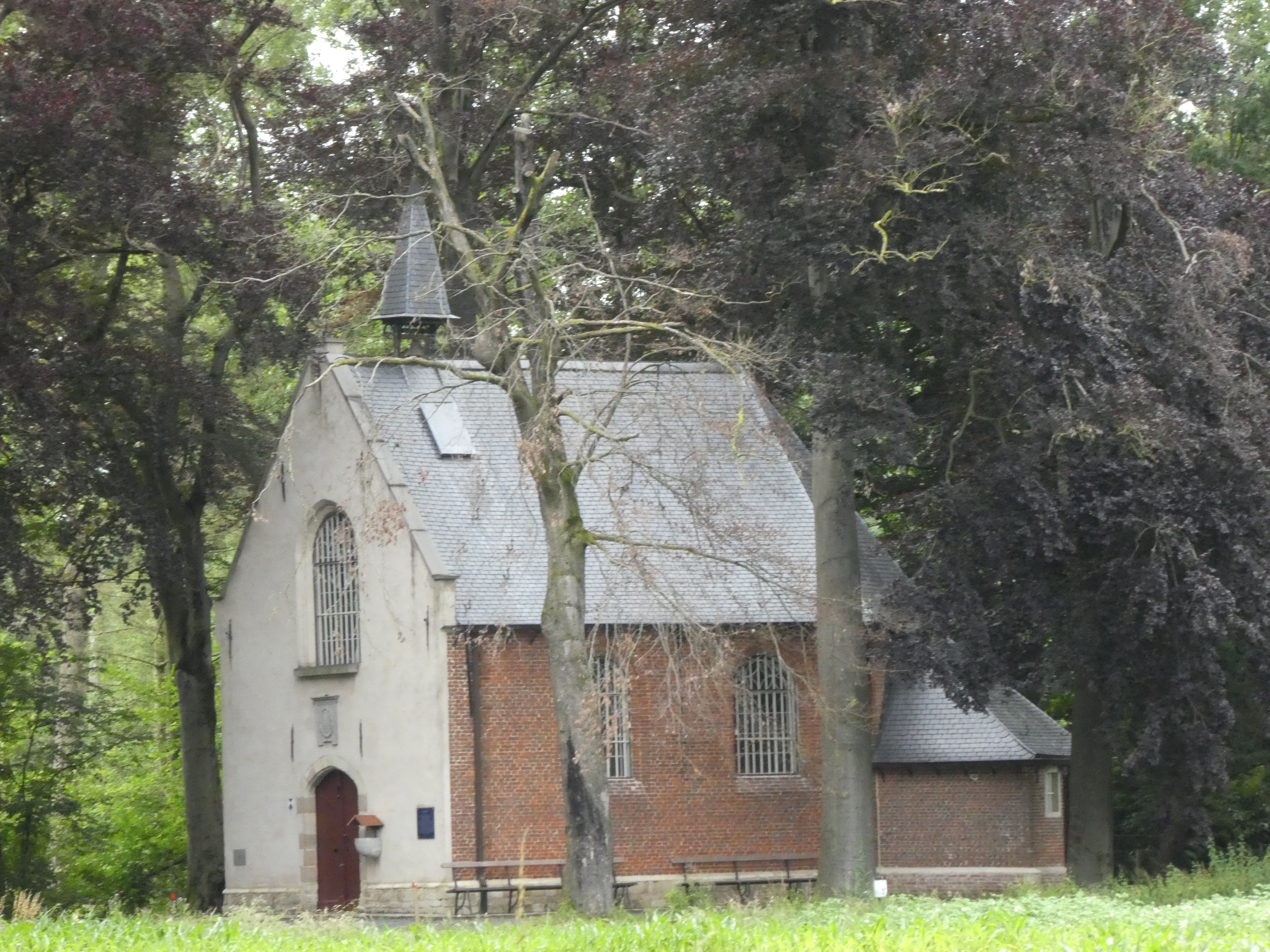
Kruiskapel, built in 1626

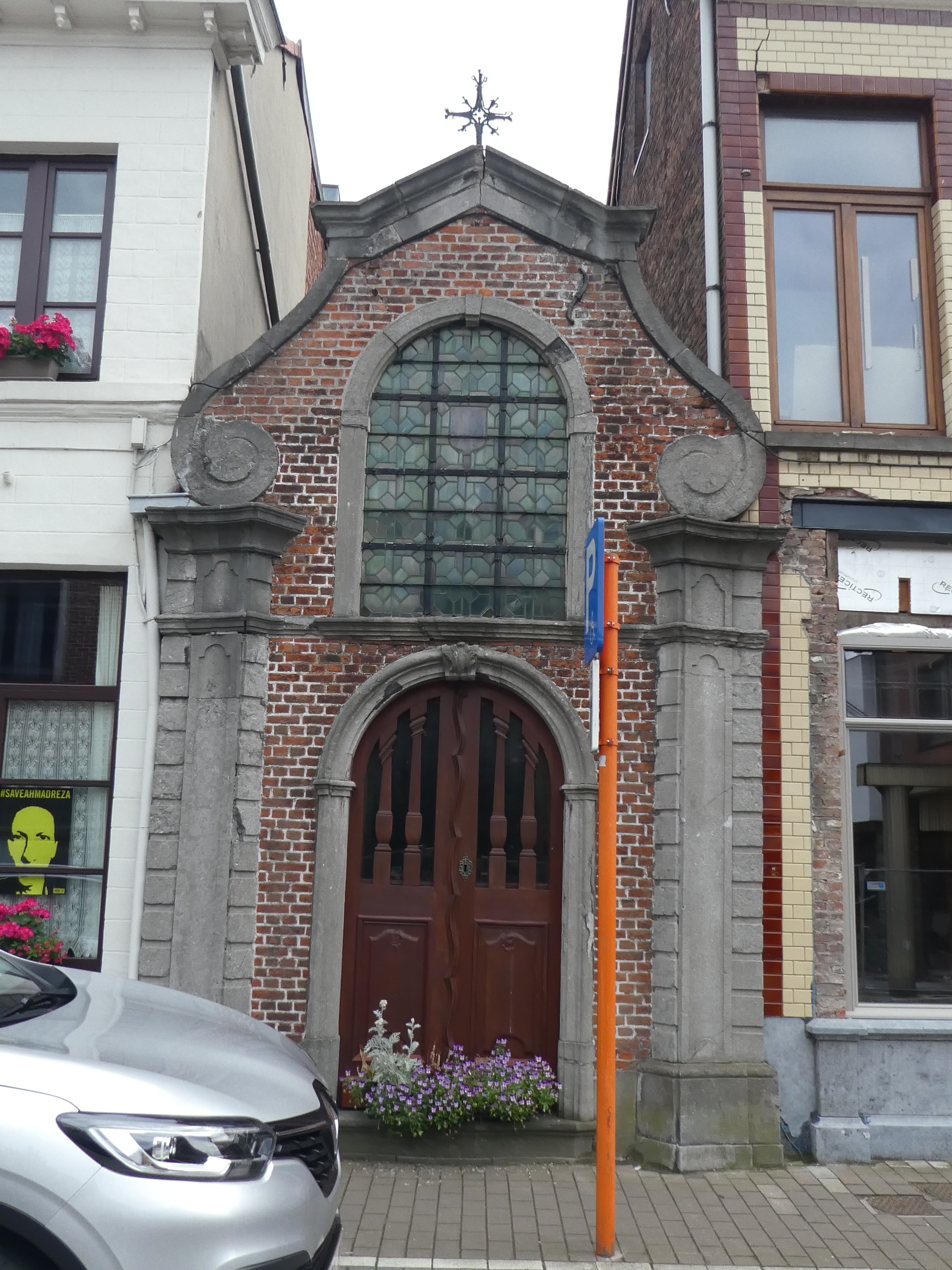
1633 chapel on Luikstraat

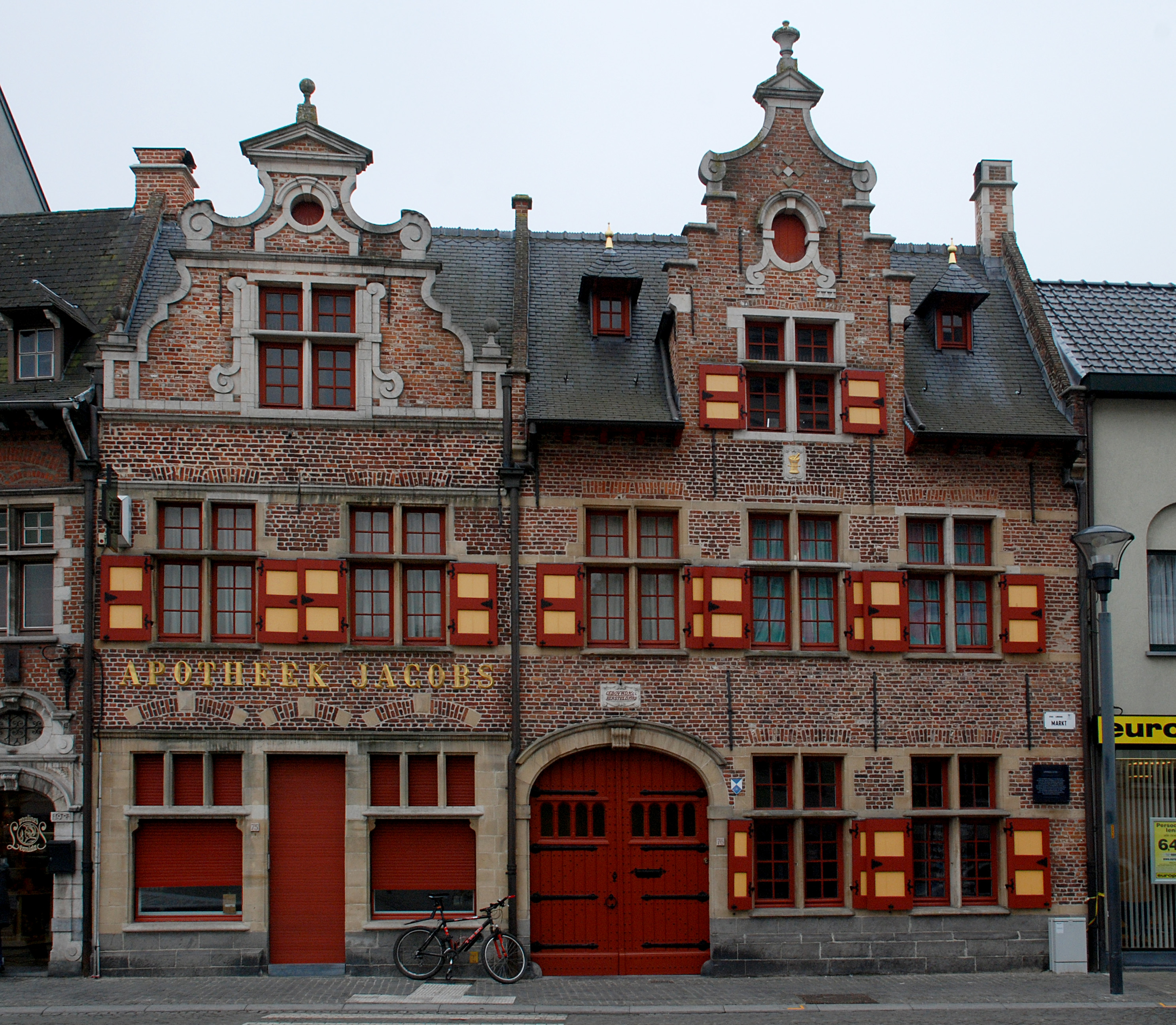
17th-century houses

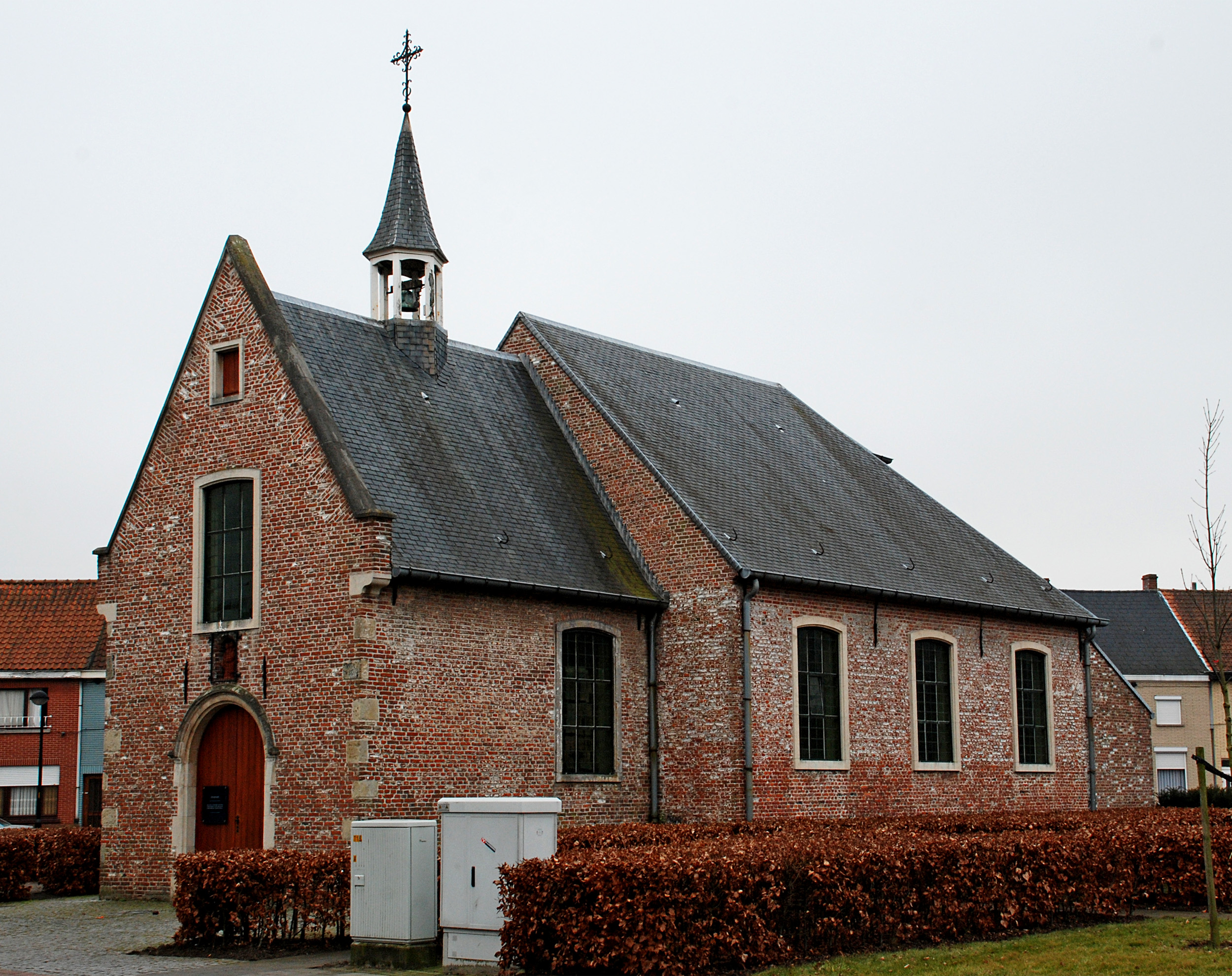
Sint-Annakapel, destroyed in 1568 and rebuilt in 1644

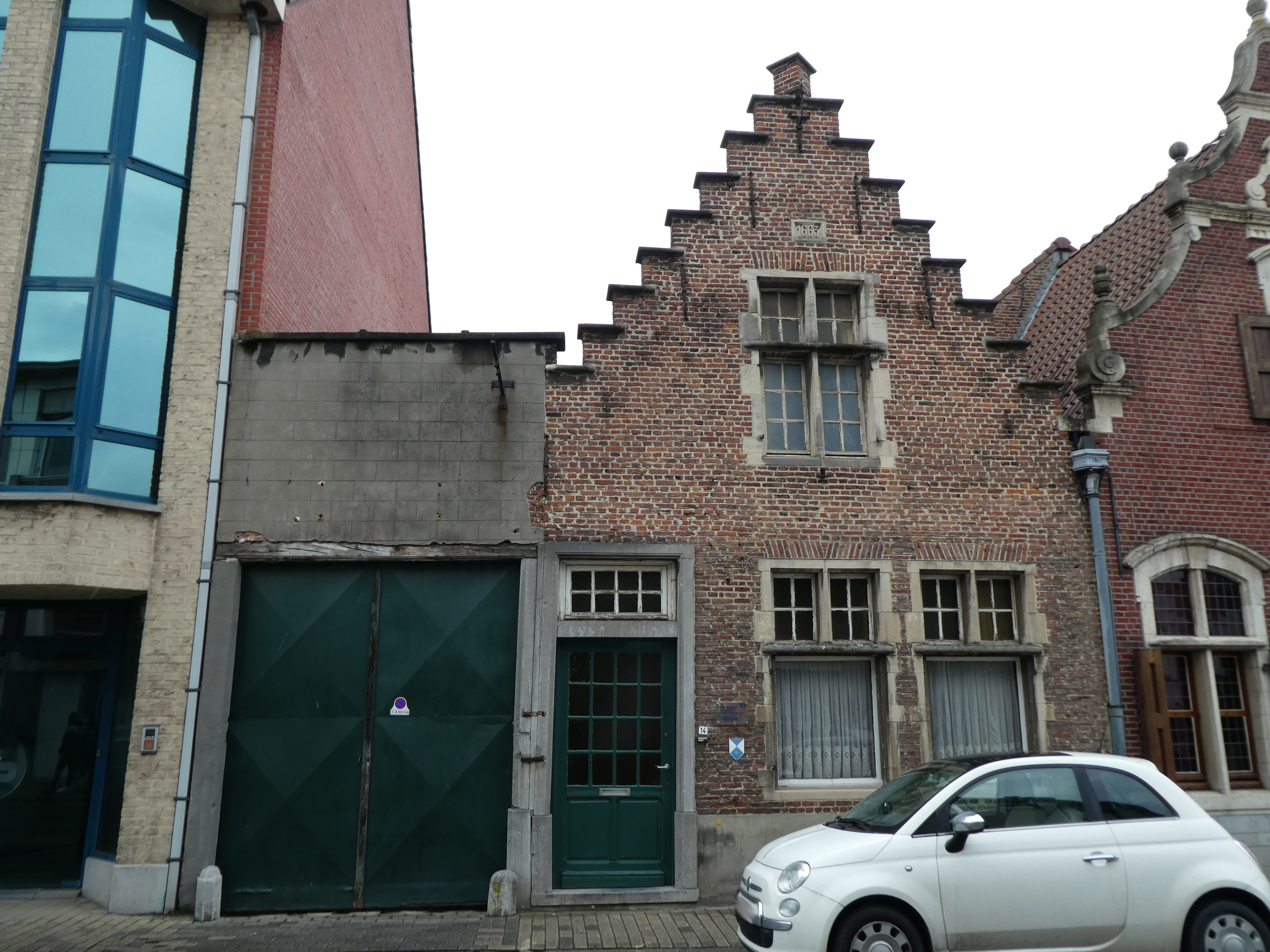
House built in 1663

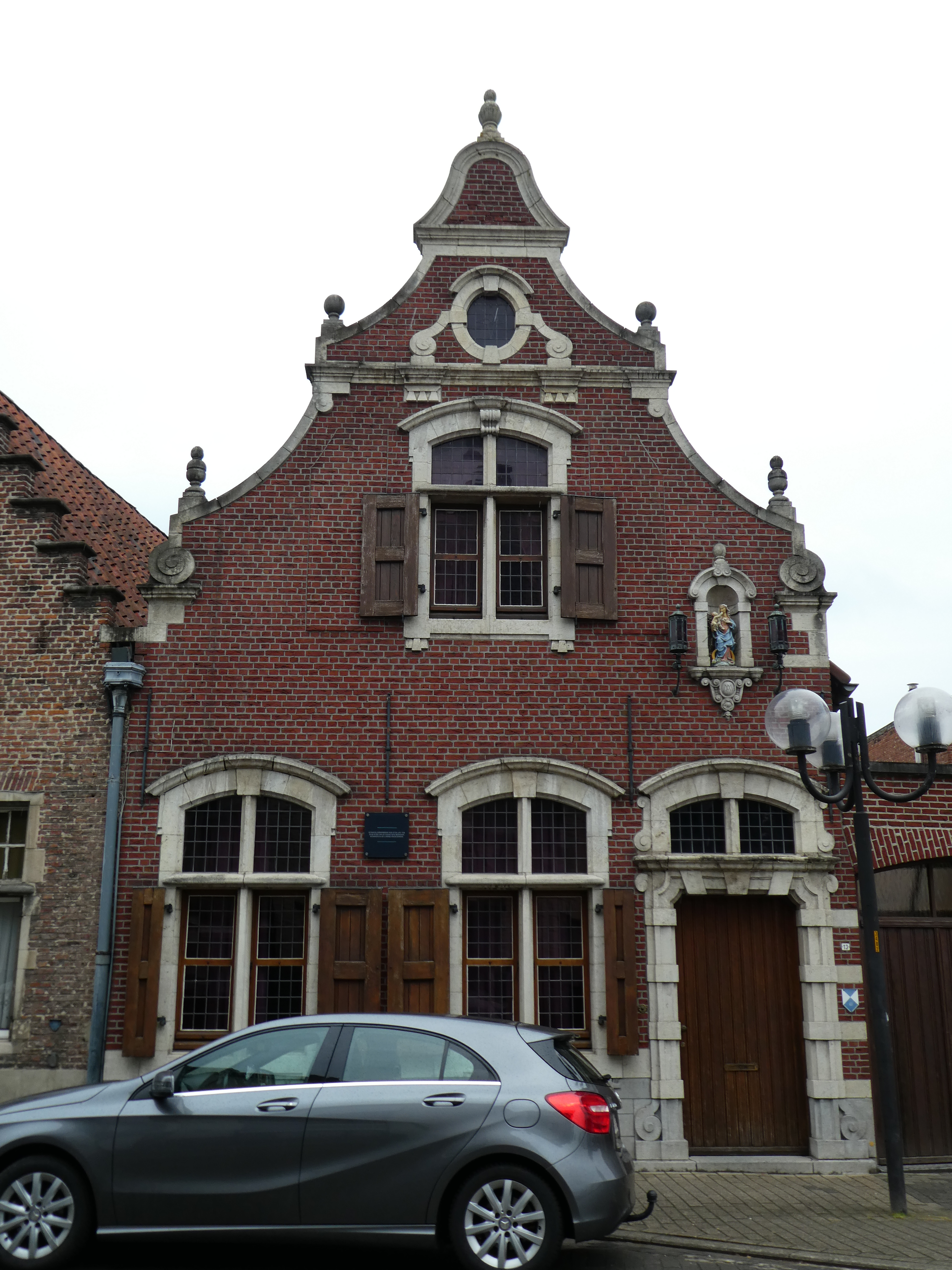
17th-century house on Vrijheidsplein

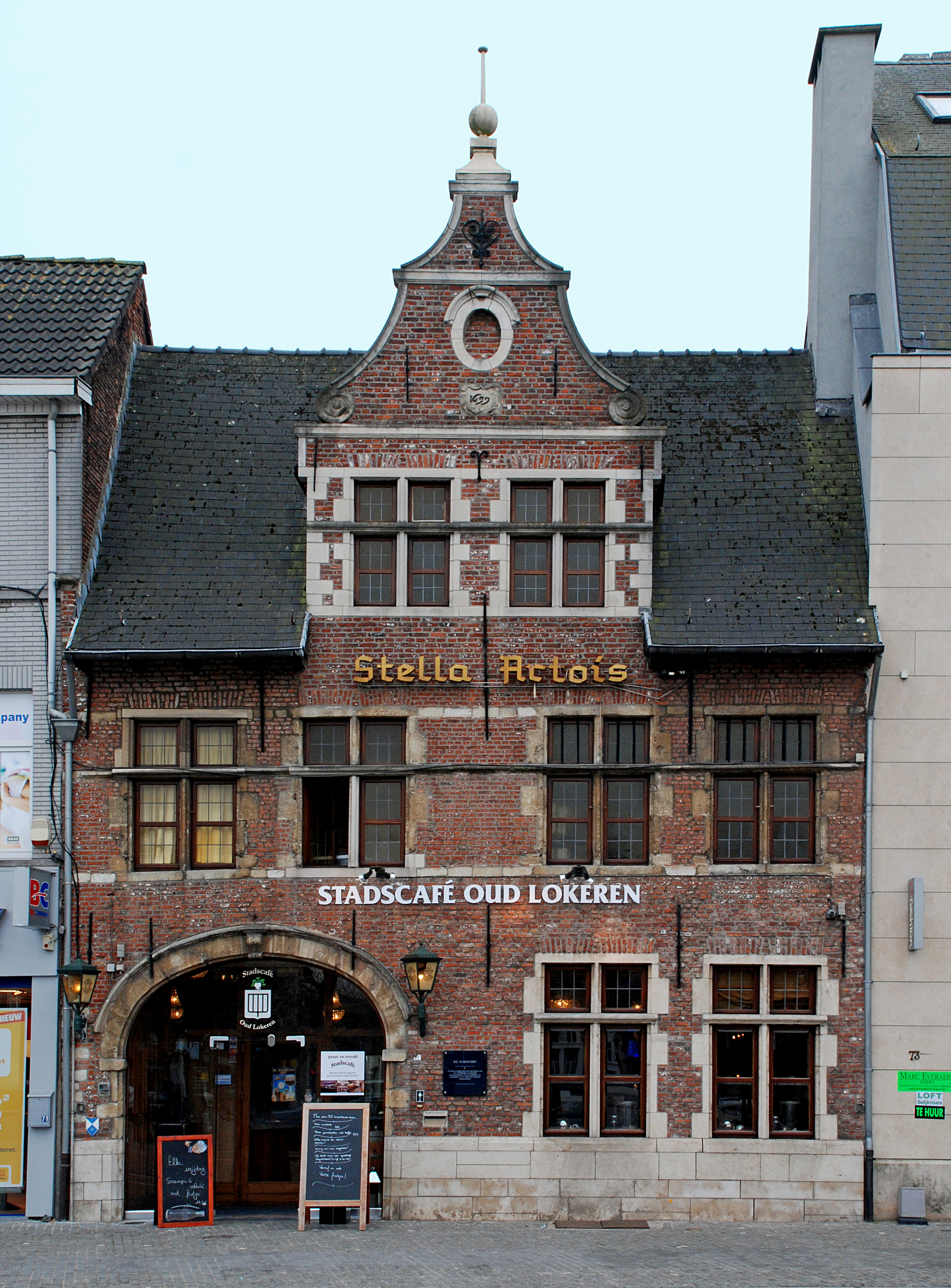
Huis Groene Poort, 17th century

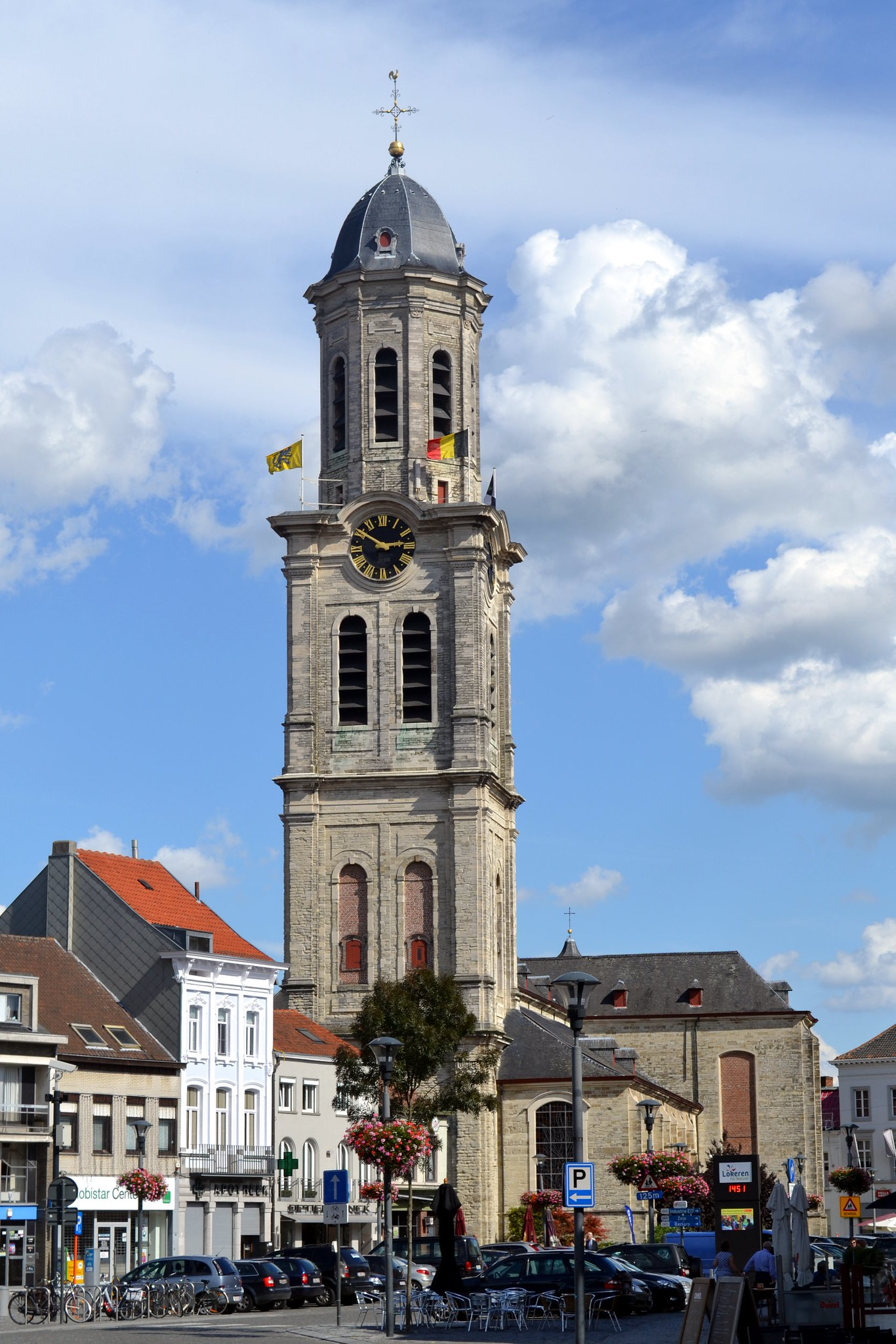
Church of Saint Laurence

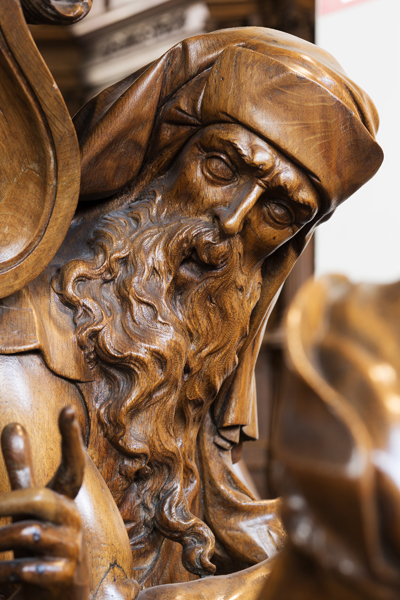
Detail of pulpit, Church of Saint Laurence

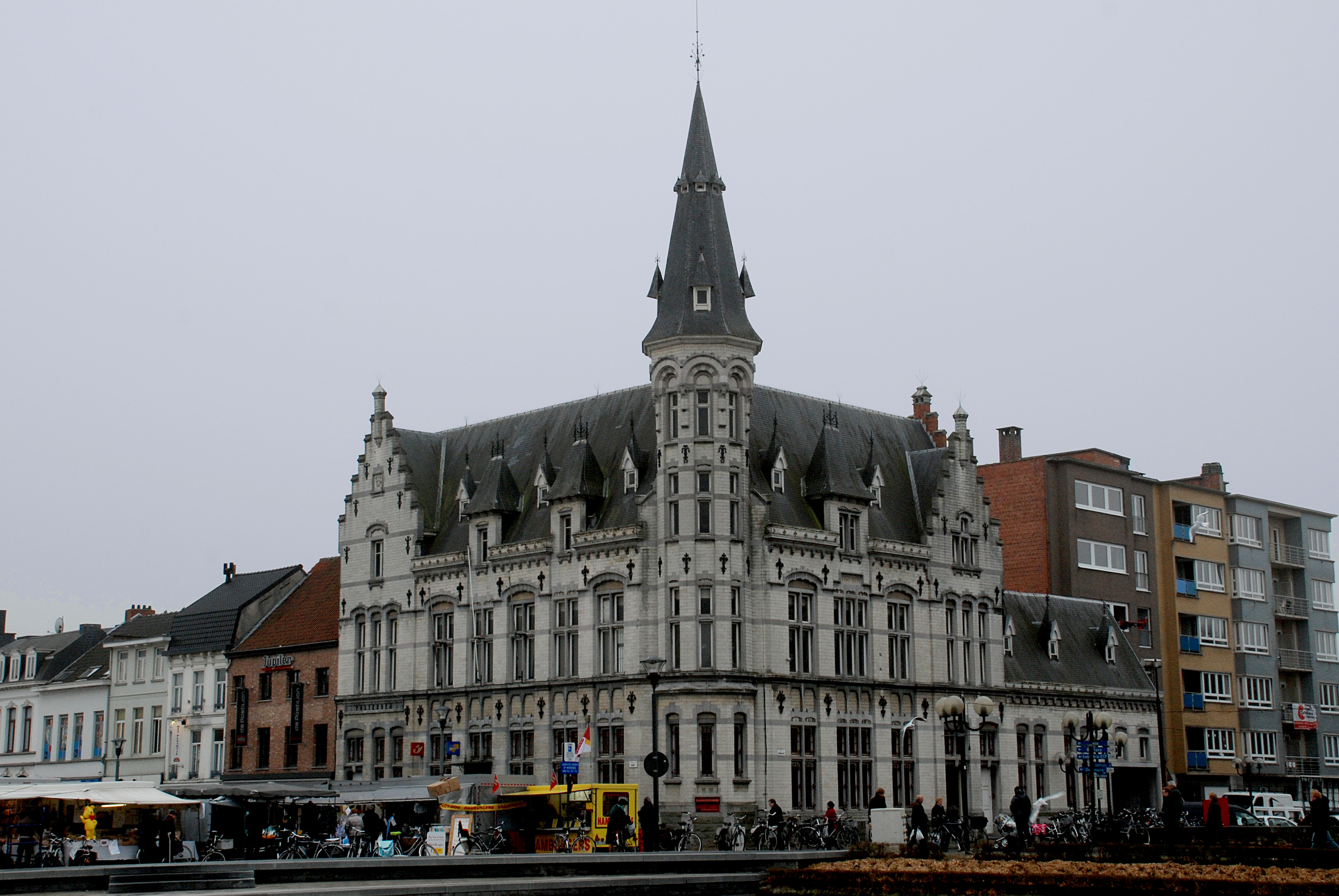
The Old Post Office

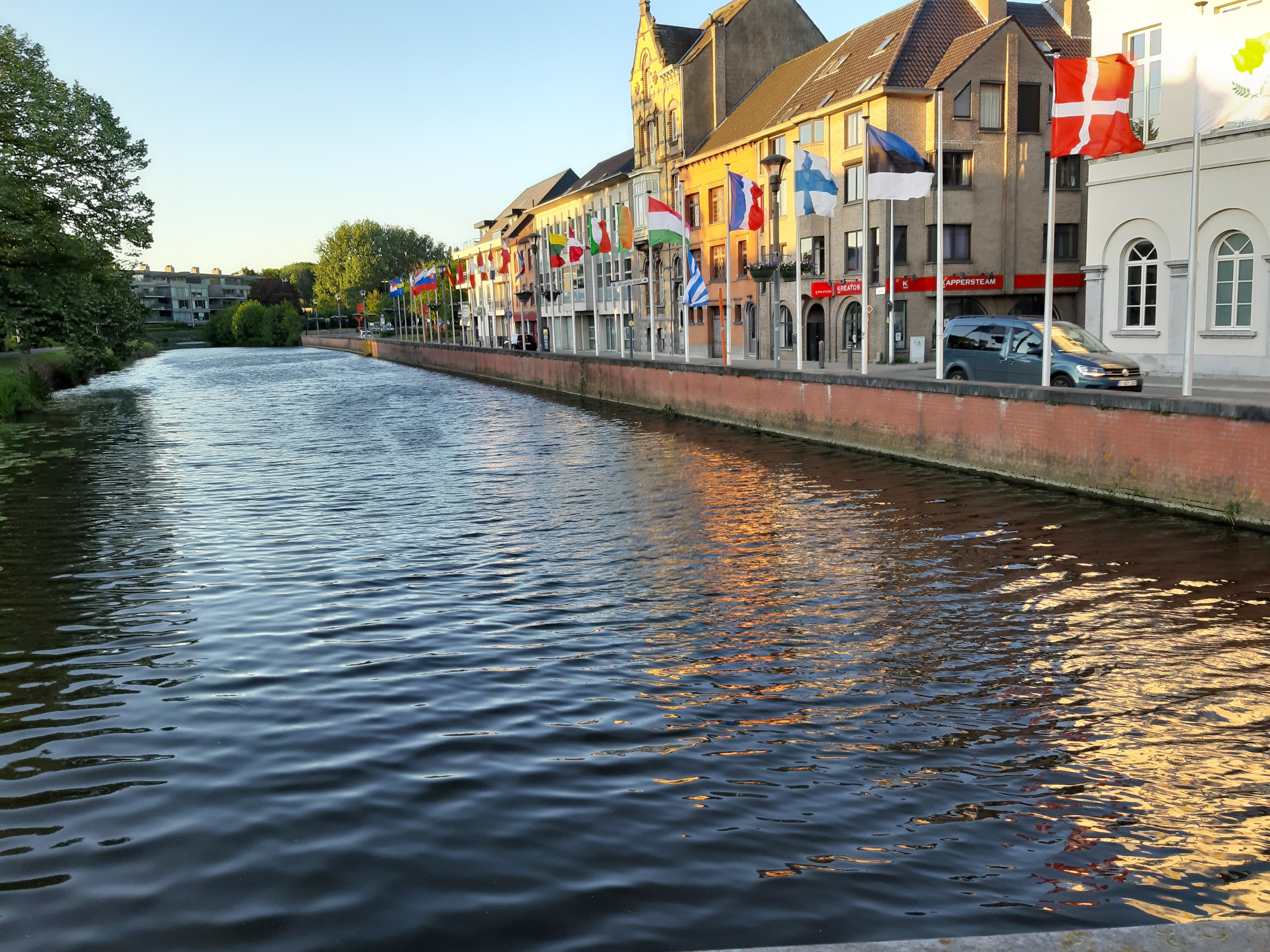
The Durme river

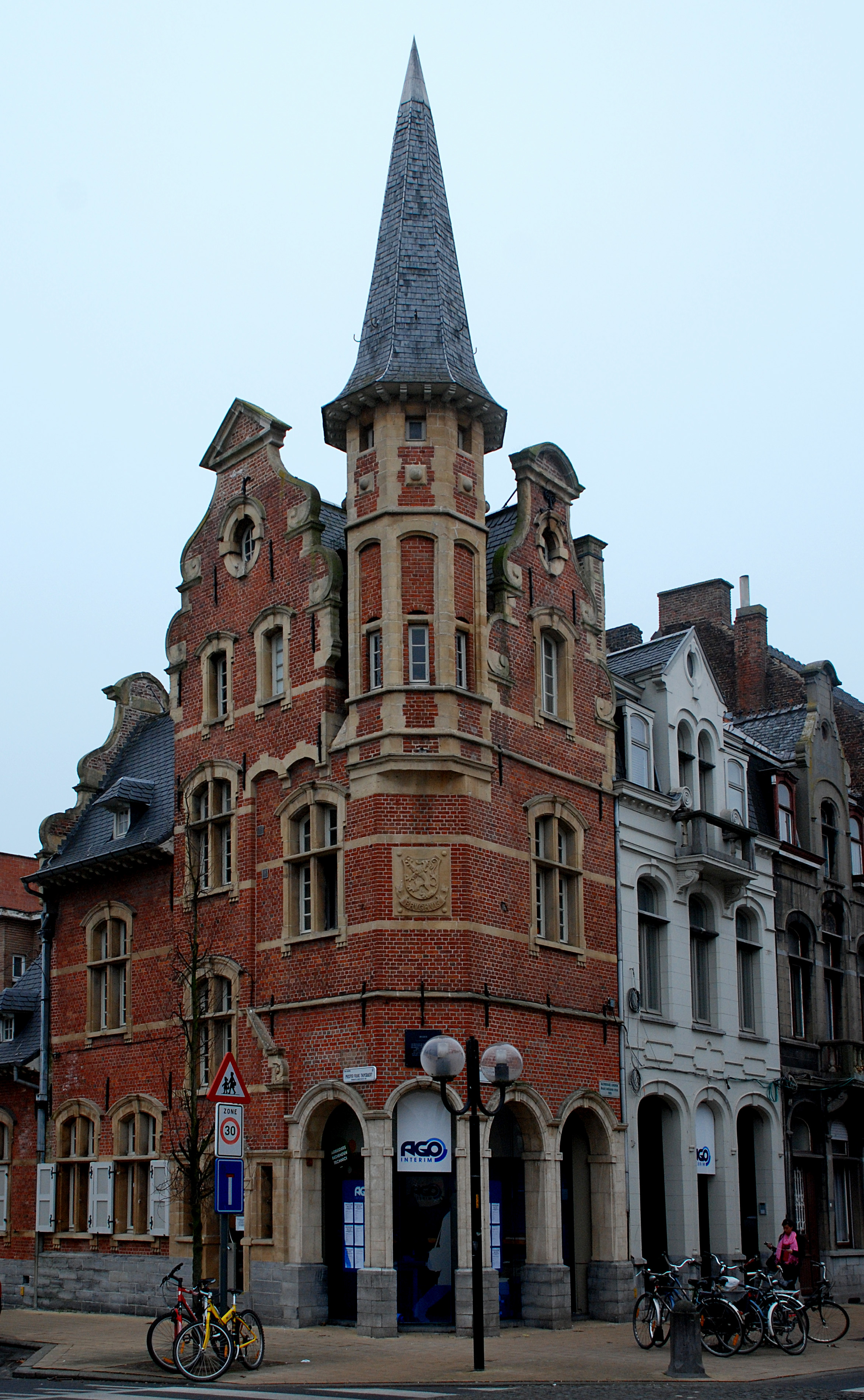
The Brughuis on Stationstraat

== Notable inhabitants ==
- Jan van Lokeren, sculptor (fl. 1375–1381)
- Hendrick de Somer, painter (1602–1656)
- Pieter Legouch, painter (?–1664)
- Abraham Smit, painter (c. 1621–1672)
- Jan Baptist de Smet, president of the Mechelen Seminary, vicar general of the Archdiocese of Mechelen, Bishop of Ypres and Ghent (1674–1741)
- Joséphine Nyssens Keelhoff, activist, social reformer, editor (1833–1917)
- Frans Rens, writer (1805–1874)
- August De Wilde, painter (1819–1886)
- Miet Smet, politician (b. 1943)
- Aimé Anthuenis, former football player and coach (b. 1943)
- Gabriel of Comane, archbishop of Western Europe of the Ecumenical Patriarchate of the Eastern Orthodox church (b. 1946)
- Marleen Temmerman, gynaecologist (b. 1953)
- Willy Linthout, comics author (b. 1953)
- François Van der Elst, football player (b. 1954)
- Preben Elkjær, football player (b. 1957)
- Chris Van den Durpel, actor and imitator (b. 1960)
- Filip De Wilde, football player (b. 1964)
- Paul Verhaeghen, novelist (b. 1965)
- Femke Maes, former international football player (b. 1980)
- Jelle Van Damme, former international football player (b. 1983)
- Linde Merckpoel, radio presenter (b. 1984)
- Greg Van Avermaet, professional cyclist (b. 1985)
- Killian Overmeire, former international football player (b. 1985)
- Lorca Van De Putte, football player (b. 1988)
- Manuel Benson, football player (b. 1997)
- Luka van den Keybus, gymnast (b. 1997)
- Tim Coppens, fashion designer

== Sports and events ==
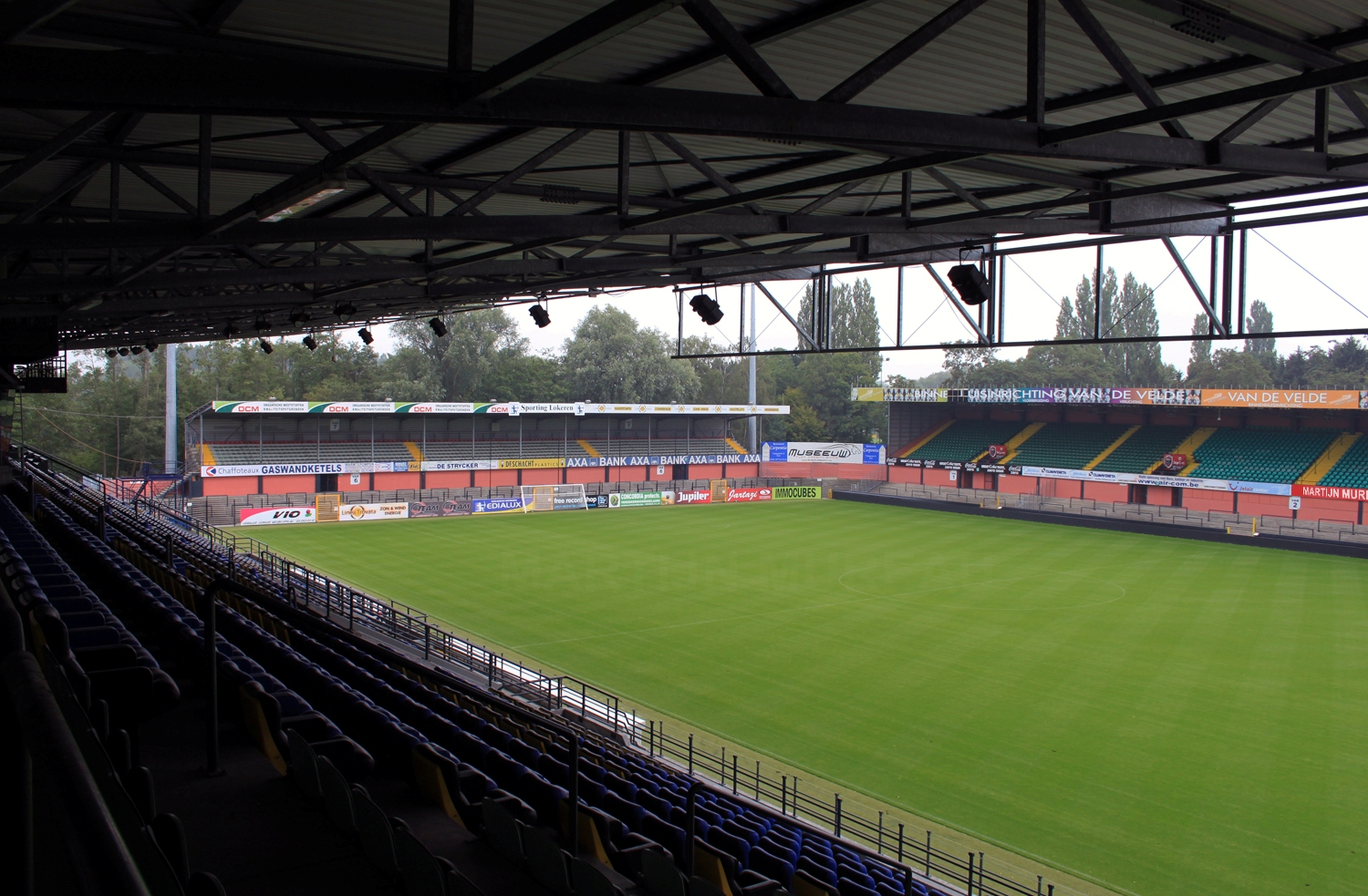
Daknamstadion

- The principle football club of the city is KSC Lokeren.
- Lokeren is well known within Flanders for an annual ten-day music fest and fair (the Lokerse Feesten), which takes place during the first week of August.
- Rapencross is an international cyclo-cross race that is held in Lokeren since 2018.

On 14 July 1970, Lokeren was the scene of a sporting disaster, when a minibus carrying a team of speedway riders from West Ham, London, was involved in a collision with a petrol tanker. 4 riders were killed, two seriously injured and Phil Bishop a famous speedway ace from the 1930s, who was managing the team was also killed.
