= Abraham Smit =

Dutch painter

Abraham Smit or de Smet (c. 1621 – (buried 30 August 1672)) was a Dutch Golden Age painter.

He was born to Ariaentje van Eck in Lokeren, Spanish Netherlands, around 1621. He moved to Amsterdam, Dutch Republic, where he was active at least from 1649 to 1672. Smit married Trijntje Cornelis (1627 – 1653) in Amsterdam on 2 October 1649. After her death in 1653 he remarried to Anna Lubbers Baey (1622 – 1688), who survived him.

His children, Pieter (Smit, de Smit) and Jacobus also became painters. Jacobus worked under commission for Pieter de Graeff from 1683 until 1686.

He and his sons were Roman Catholics.

== Sources ==
- Stadsarchief Amsterdam, Amsterdam: DTB-registers (toegangsnummer 5001), 680: 153 & 682: 37
- Bredius, A., Künstler-Inventare, Urkunden zur Geschichte der holländische Kunst des XVIten, XVIIten und XVIIIten Jahrhunderts (8 vols.), Den Haag: Nijhoff (1915-1922). volume 3: 981
- Groenendijk, Pieter, Beknopt biografisch lexicon van Zuid- en Noord-Nederlandse schilders, graveurs, glasschilders, tapijtwevers et cetera van ca. 1350 tot ca. 1720, Leiden: Primavera (2008)
- Thieme, Ulrich & Becker, Felix, Allgemeines Lexikon der bildenden Künstler von der Antike bis zur Gegenwart, Band 31, Leipzig: Engelmann (1937)
- Scheltema, P., Rembrand: Redevoering over het leven en de verdiensten van Rembrand van Rijn, met eene menigte geschiedkundige bijlagen meerendeels uit echte bronnen geput, Amsterdam: P.N. van Kampen (1853), 71
