= Durme =

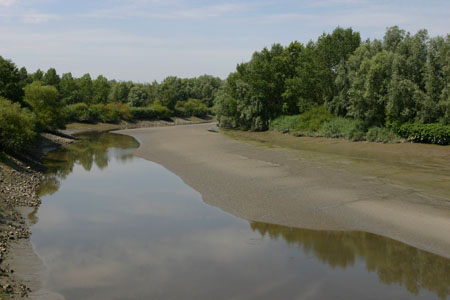

Location
- Country: Belgium

Physical characteristics
- Source
  - location: East Flanders
- Mouth
  - location: Scheldt
  - coordinates: 51°06′08″N 4°10′27″E
- Length: 23.8 km (14.8 mi)

Basin features
- Progression: Scheldt→ North Sea

The Durme is a 23.8 km river in Belgium. A left tributary of the Scheldt, it is created by the confluence of the Zuidlede and the Moervaart near Daknam, Lokeren. It passes through Lokeren, Waasmunster and borders Zele, before merging in the Scheldt at Tielrode (Temse), where it forms the border between Hamme and Temse.
