= Tim Coppens =

Belgian fashion designer

- Born: Lokeren, Belgium
- Label: Tim Coppens
- Website: timcoppens.com

Tim Coppens is a Belgian fashion designer who currently lives and works in New York City. He is an ANDAM and LVMH Prize finalist, as well as three time CFDA nominee, and winner of the 2014 CFDA/Swarovski Award for Best Emerging Menswear Designer.

== Early life and career ==
Born and raised in Belgium, Coppens graduated from the Royal Academy of Fine Arts in Antwerp in 1998.

== Career ==
Apart from his services to various luxury and athletic brands as Adidas and Ralph Lauren, Coppens founded his own namesake fashion label in 2011 which is sold globally. Barneys New York immediately ordered his first collection and international retailers suit, including Isetan (Japan), Lane Crawford (Hong Kong), Matches (London), Mr Porter (Online) and Dover Street Market (London).

From 2016 to 2018, Coppens served as creative director of Under Armour Sportswear, a new collection of Under Armour.

In 2020, Coppens was appointed a consultant design director at Calvin Klein, working on the design of the CK Calvin Klein line.

== Recognition ==
Coppens received the Ecco Domani Award for Best Menswear Designer (2012), the Fashion Group International's Rising Star of the Year award (2013) and the Swarovski Award for Menswear (2014).
