= Sterrebeek Castle =

Coordinates: 51.103°N 3.988°E

- Belgium
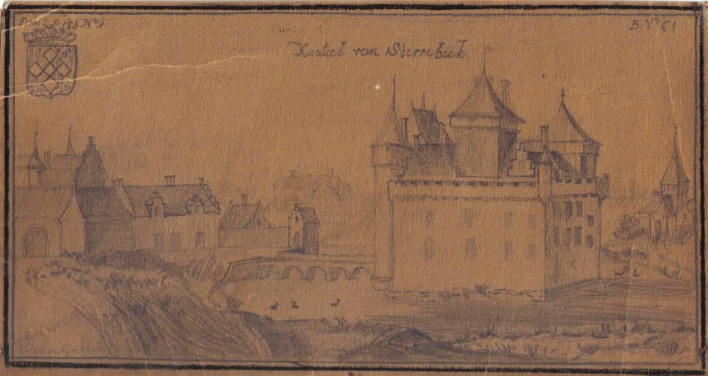

Site information
- Type: Castle

Sterrebeek Castle was a moated castle in Lokeren, of which have survived only a few remains incorporated in a 19th-century building. The castle once belonged to the de Cortewille family, and was situated between the Oude Vismijn and Lokeren's Markt.

In the 19th century, what remained of the castle was integrated into a building housing a glass warehouse. Traces of the former castle can be seen in the said building's eastern facade, in the remaining arched door (korfboogdeur) and sandstone corner stone. The remains of the castle can be accessed through a small alley.

The building in which the remains were integrated is a broad, brick three-story structure, with round arched windows and saddle roof.

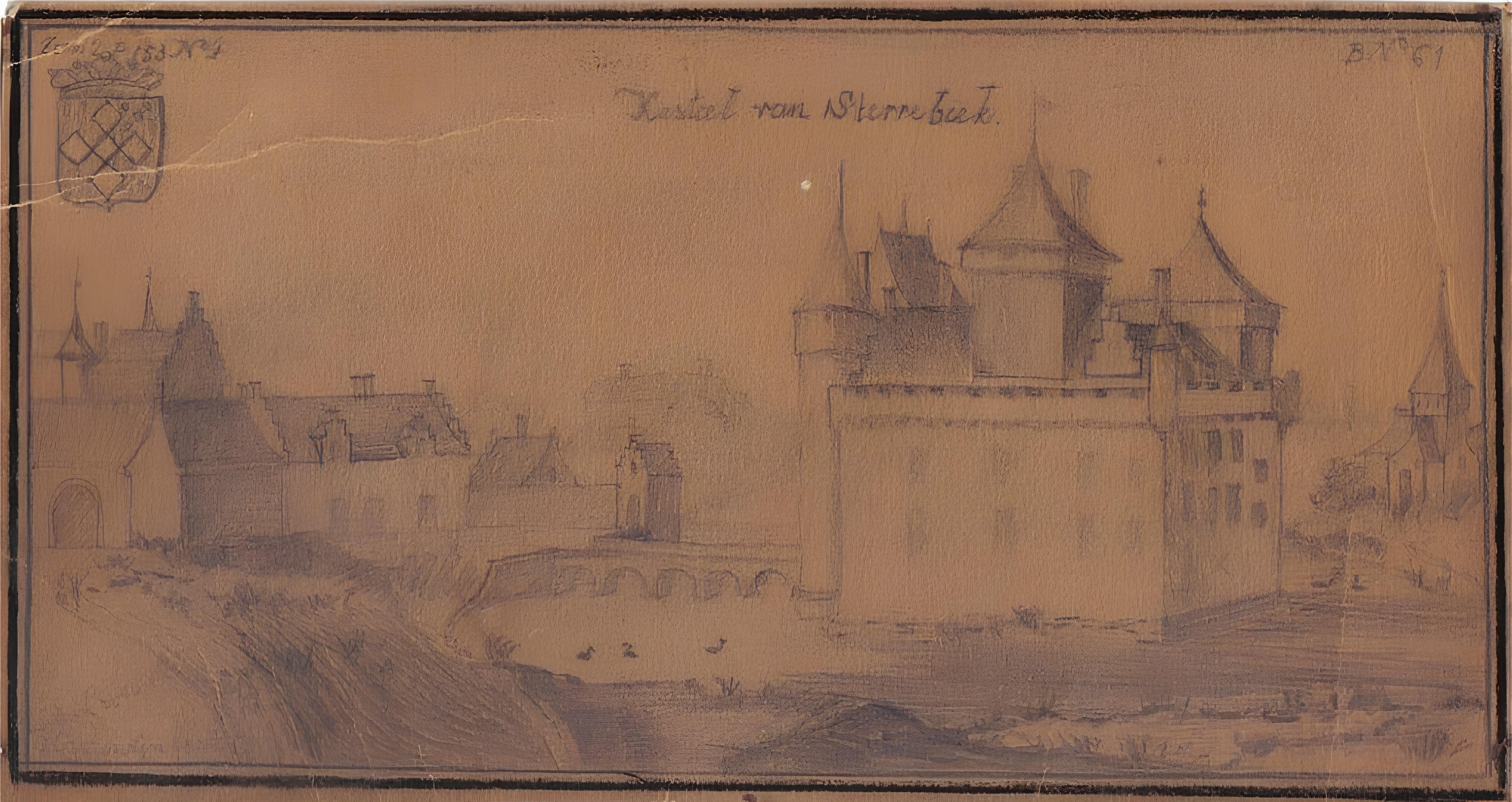
Sketch of Sterrebeek Castle (Lokeren City Archives)

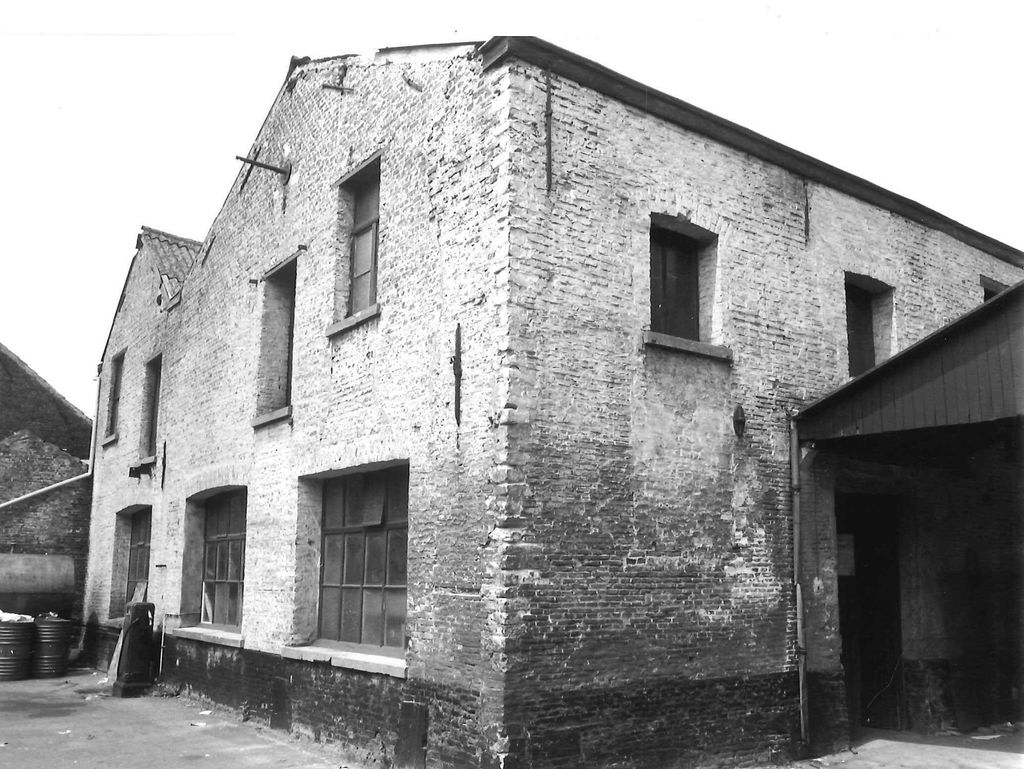
Remains of Sterrebeek Castle integrated in the modern building

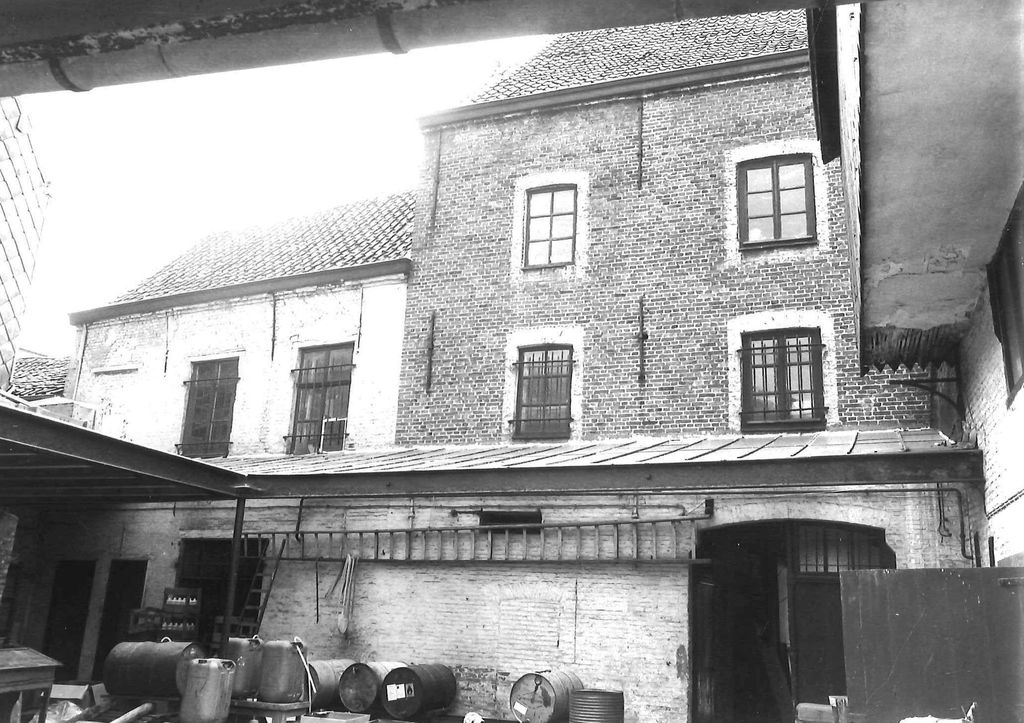
The 19th-century brick industrial building

== See also ==
- List of castles in Belgium

== Sources ==
- Demey A. 1981: Inventaris van het cultuurbezit in België, Architectuur, Provincie Oost-Vlaanderen, Arrondissement Sint-Niklaas, Bouwen door de eeuwen heen in Vlaanderen 7N1 (B-L), Brussel - Gent.
