= August De Wilde =

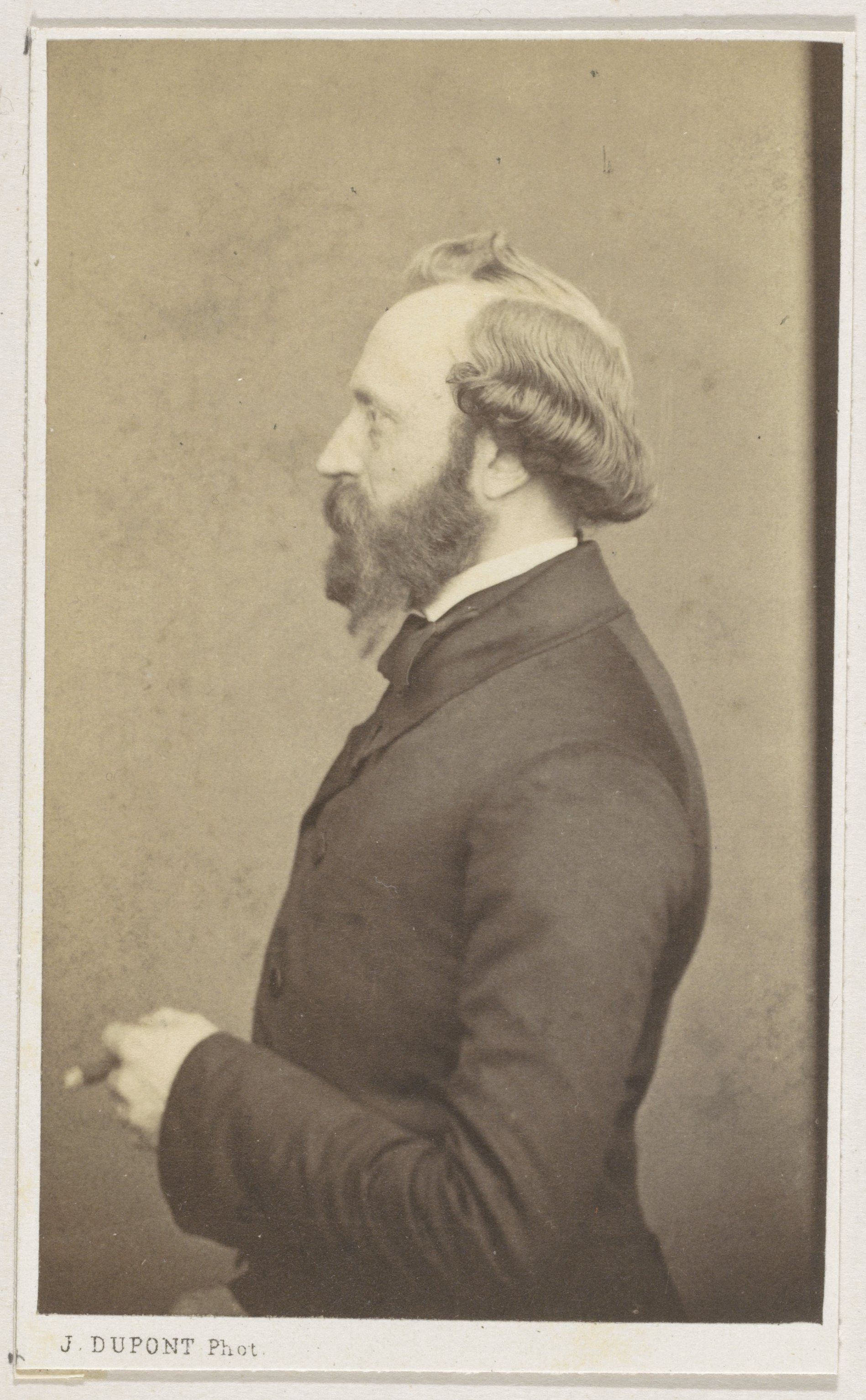
- Born: 2 June 1819; Lokeren, East Flanders, United Kingdom of the Netherlands
- Died: 7 October 1886 (aged 67); Sint-Niklaas, East Flanders, Belgium
- Known for: painting
- Notable work: Love in the Moonlight, Portrait of Theodoor Janssens, Portrait of the King

August De Wilde (2 June 1819 – 7 October 1886) was a Belgian painter.

He was born on 2 June 1819 in Lokeren and moved to Sint-Niklaas with his parents in 1833. He completed his studies at the local drawing school, graduating with acclamation. He continued his studies at the Antwerp Academy. There, he also distinguished himself. He moved to Antwerp and in 1851 he replaced Jan De Loose as director of the drawing school of Sint-Niklaas.

Many paintings by this artist are known. These include domestic scenes, portraits, and altarpieces.

The works of De Wilde could be found for example in the hall of the town hall of Sint-Niklaas (H.M. de Koningen, after Gallait), and in the place of prayer of the choristers of the abbey of Rozendaal, in Waasmunster (O.L. Vrouw, te midden van engelen). He won the 1870 Dunkirk painting competition with the painting Love in the Moonlight (De liefde in den mooneschijn).

== Gallery ==
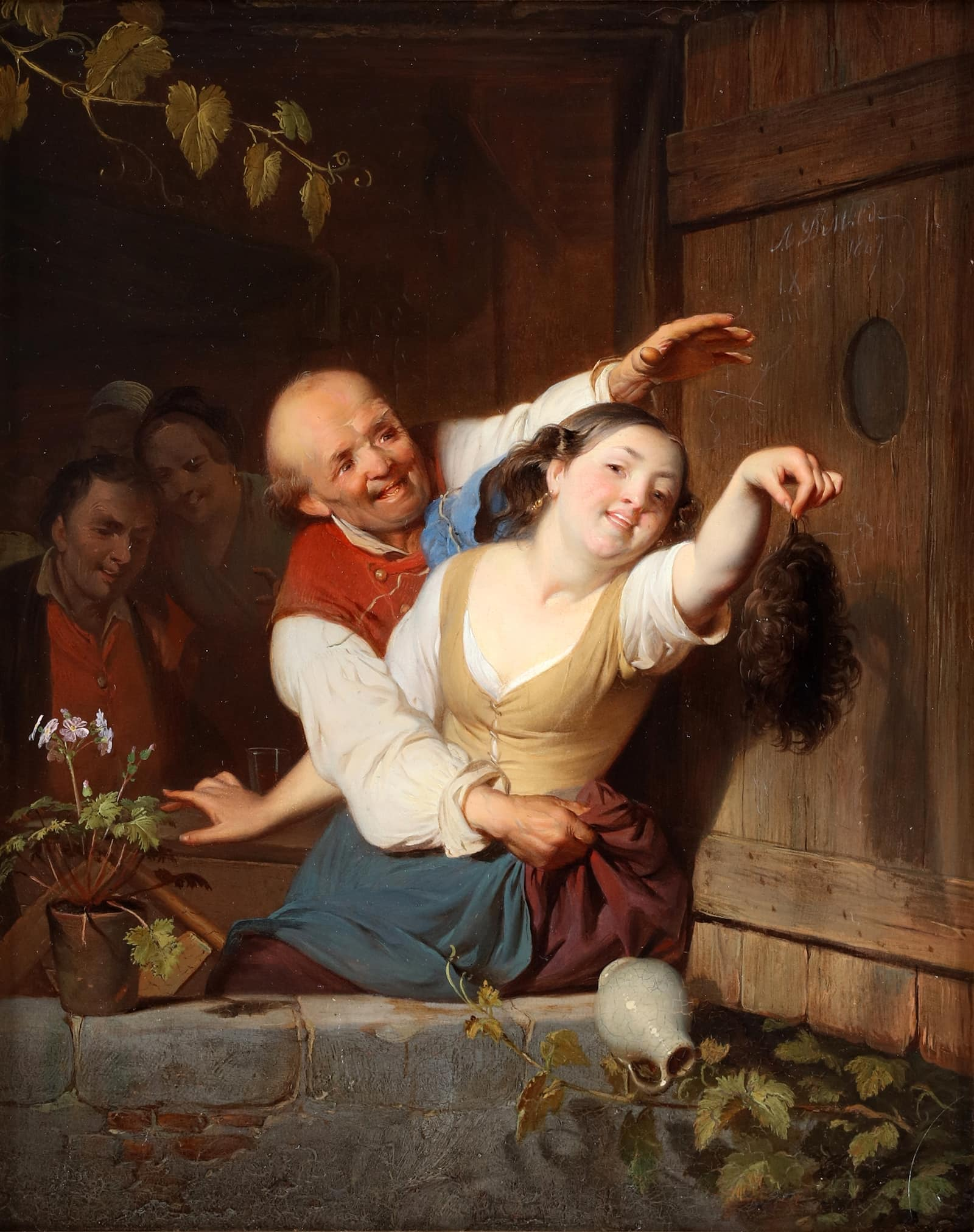
Stolen vanity, 1847. (Collection of the Earl of Moreton)

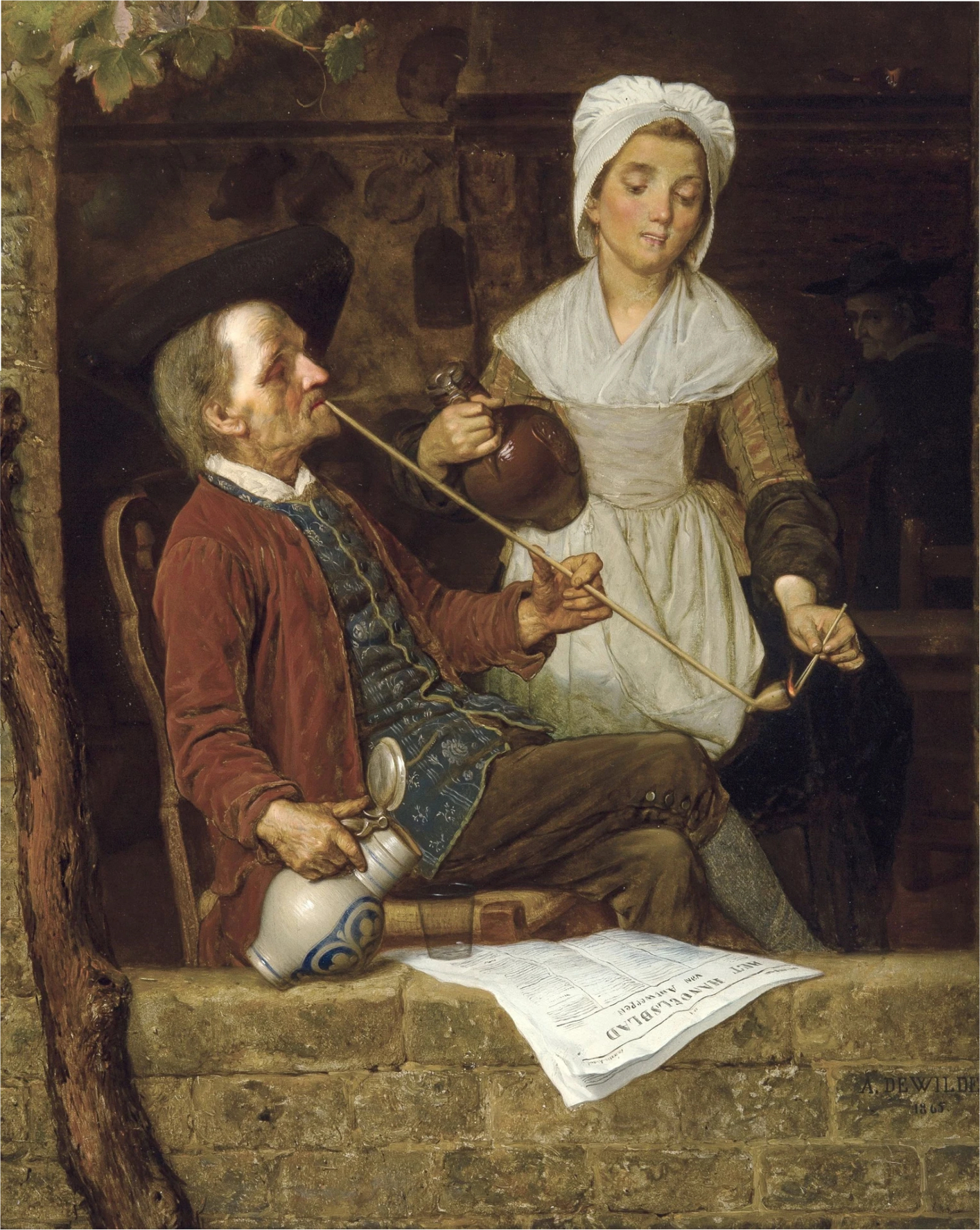
The Pipe Smoker, 1865

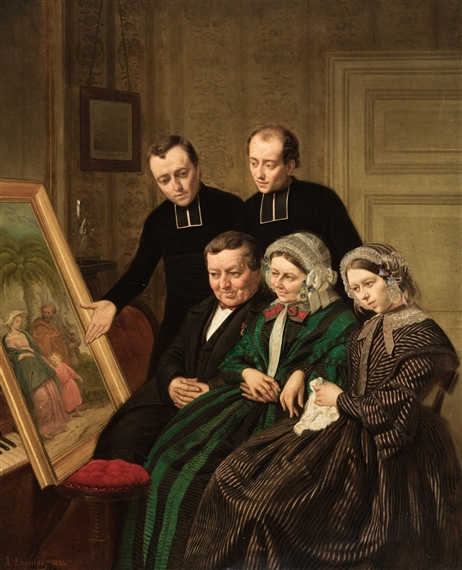
The Dilettantes, 1858

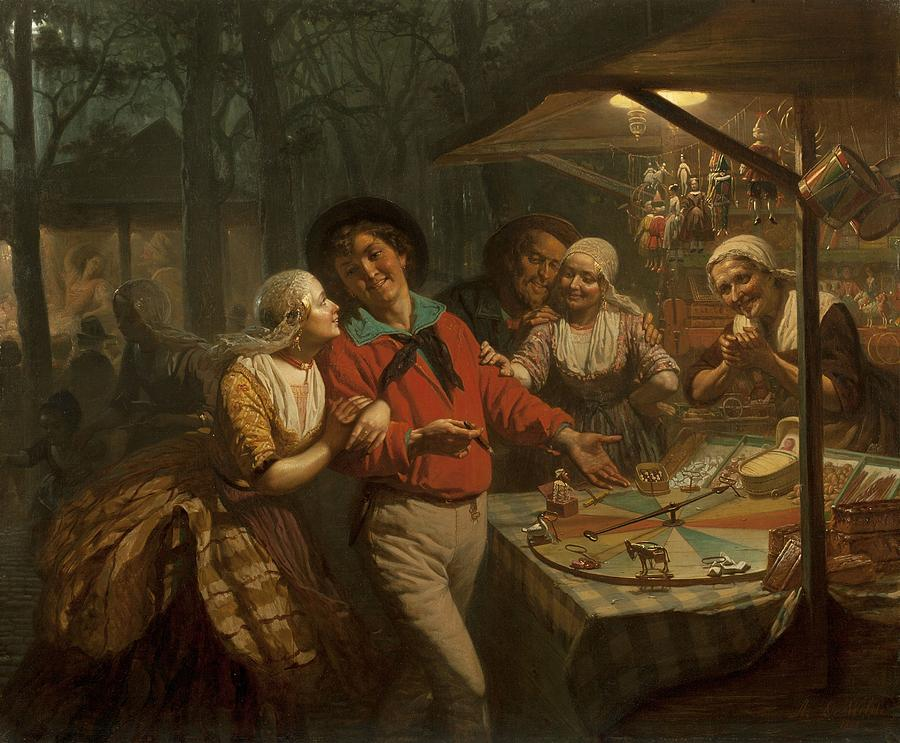
The Wheel of Fortune, 1861

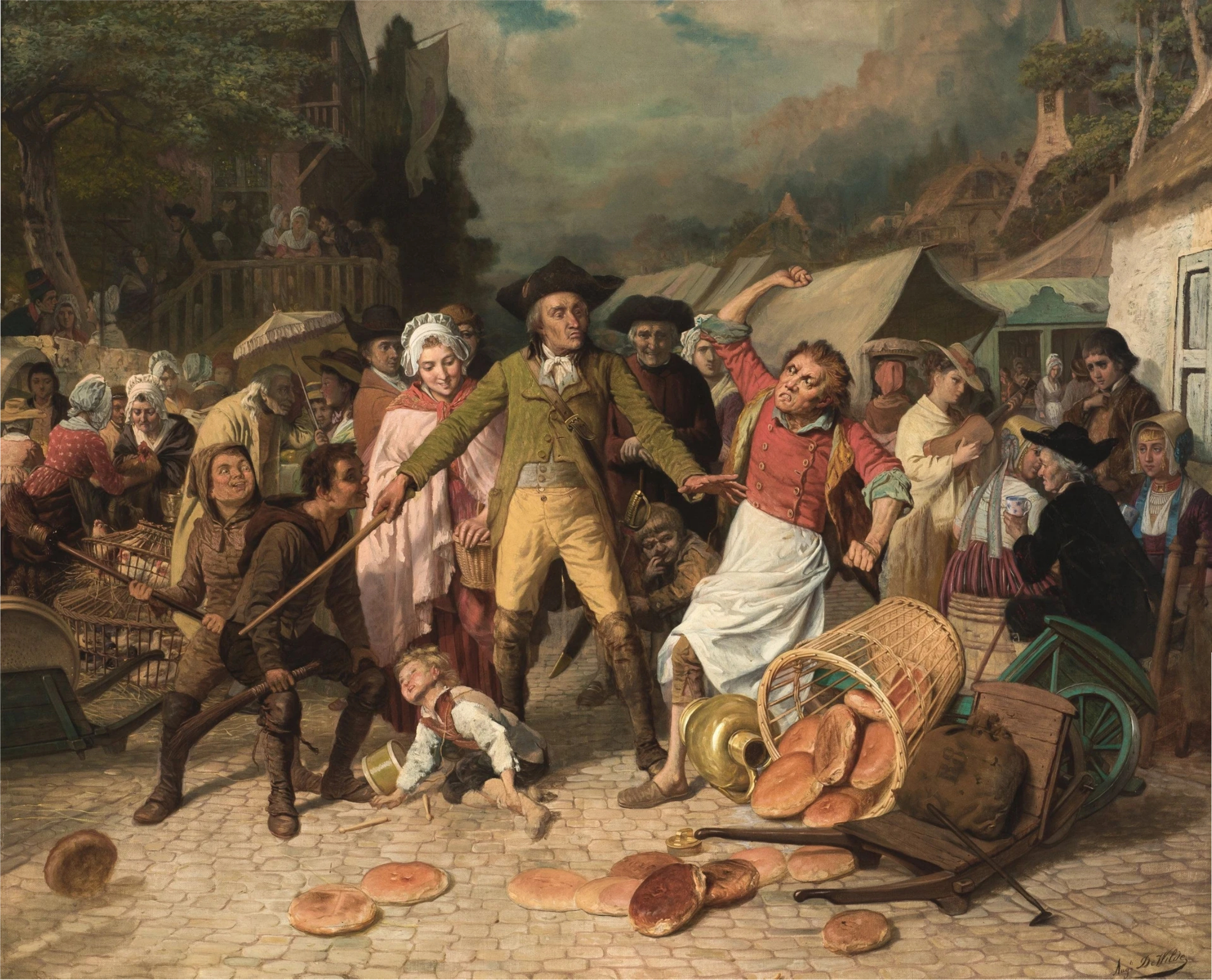
Market Scene

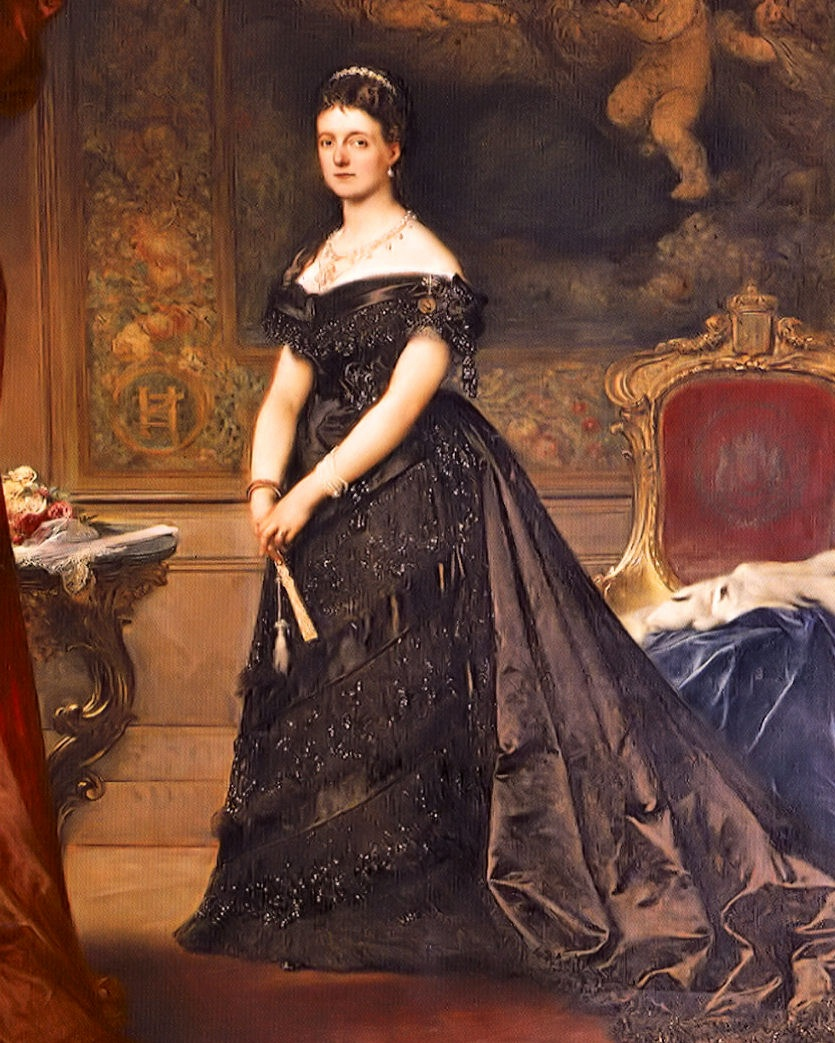
Maria Hendrika, Queen of Belgium (after Louis Gallait)

== Bibliography ==
- De Potter, Frans; Broeckaert, Jan (1884). De Wilde (August) in Geschiedenis der stad Lokeren. Drukkerij C. Annoot-Braeckman. pp. 307−308.
- Thieme, Ulrich; Becker, Felix (1942). Allgemeines Lexikon der bildenden Künstler: von der Antike bis zur Gegenwart vol. 35. Leipzig: Seemann. p. 506.
- Bénézit, Emmanuel (1966). Dictionnaire critique et documentaire des peintres, sculpteurs, dessinateurs et graveurs de tous les temps et de tous pays par un groupe d'écrivains spécialistes français et étrangers. Paris: Librairie Grund.
- (1978). A checklist of painters c1200-1976 represented in the Witt Library, Courtauld Institute of Art, London. London: Mansell. p. 327 (as: Wilde, August de).
- Eemans, Marc (1979). Biografische woordenboek der Belgische kunstenaars van 1830 tot 1970. vol. 1. Brussel: Arto. p. 182
- Piron, Paul (1999). De Belgische beeldende kunstenaars uit de 19de en 20ste eeuw. Brussel: Art in Belgium. p. 464. ISBN 90-76676-01-1
