= David Haverdings =

Dutch cyclo-cross and road cyclist

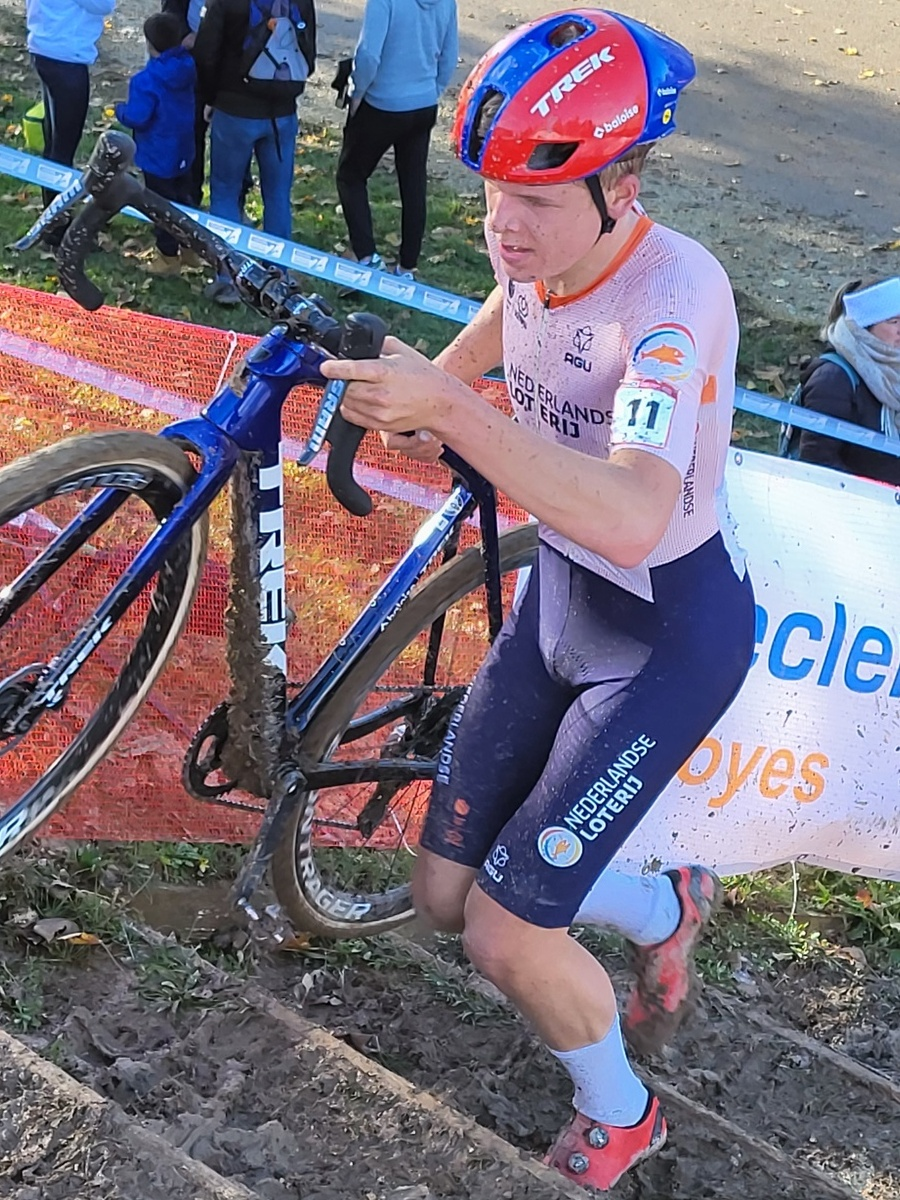
- Haverdings in 2023

Personal information
- Born: 1 April 2004 (age 22) Ruinen, Netherlands
- Height: 1.76 m (5 ft 9 in)
- Weight: 64 kg (141 lb)

Cycling career
- Sport: Cycling
- Current team: Alpecin–Premier Tech Development Team
- Disciplines: Cyclo-cross; Road
- Role: Rider

Amateur team
- 2022: AA Drink Young Lions

Professional teams
- 2022–2026: Baloise–Trek Lions
- 2026–: Alpecin–Premier Tech Development Team
Medal record
Men's cyclo-cross
Representing Netherlands
European Championships
Silver medal – second place	2025 Middelkerke	Under-23
Silver medal – second place	2021 Wijster	Junior

David Haverdings (born 1 April 2004) is a Dutch cyclo-cross and road cyclist, who currently rides for UCI Continental team Alpecin–Premier Tech Development Team.

He won the 2025–26 UCI Under-23 Cyclo-cross World Cup. His younger brothers Floris and Ruben are also cyclo-cross riders.

== Major results ==
=== Cyclo-cross ===
2021–2022
1st National Junior Championships
1st Overall UCI Junior World Cup

1st Tábor
1st Namur
1st Dendermonde
1st Flamanville

Junior Superprestige

1st Gieten
1st Ruddervoorde
1st Merksplas
1st Heusden-Zolder
1st Gavere
2nd Boom

Junior X²O Badkamers Trophy

1st Baal
1st Herentals
1st Hamme
1st Brussels
3rd Lille

Junior Ethias Cross

1st Essen

1st Junior Koksijde
1st Junior Overijse
1st Junior Zonhoven
1st Junior Oostmalle
1st Junior Oisterwijk
2nd UEC European Junior Championships
2022–2023
3rd Overall Under-23 X²O Trophy

1st Baal
1st Lille

2023–2024
Under-23 X²O Trophy

1st Koppenberg
1st Herentals

2nd Waterloo
3rd Indianapolis II
2024–2025
Under-23 X²O Trophy

1st Lokeren
3rd Herentals
3rd Hamme

3rd Woerden
UCI Under-23 World Cup

3rd Dublin
3rd Hulst

2025–2026
1st Overall UCI Under-23 World Cup

1st Tábor
1st Koksijde
1st Dendermonde
1st Benidorm
2nd Hoogerheide

Under-23 X²O Trophy

1st Hofstade
2nd Baal
3rd Loenhout

2nd UEC European Under-23 Championships

=== Mountain bike ===
2022
1st Mixed relay, European Championships
Junior Swiss Bike Cup

1st Basel

2nd Cross-country, National Junior Championships
Junior French Cup

2nd Le Dévoluy

=== Road ===
2024
1st Stage 2 Tour de Namur
2025
2nd Overall Tour de Namur
3rd Overall Triptyque Ardennais

1st Stage 3

6th Dwars door het Hageland
2026
6th Muur Classic Geraardsbergen
6th Mur de Huy Classic
9th Overall West Bohemia Tour
10th Overall Alpes Isère Tour
