= Thibau Nys =

Belgian cyclist

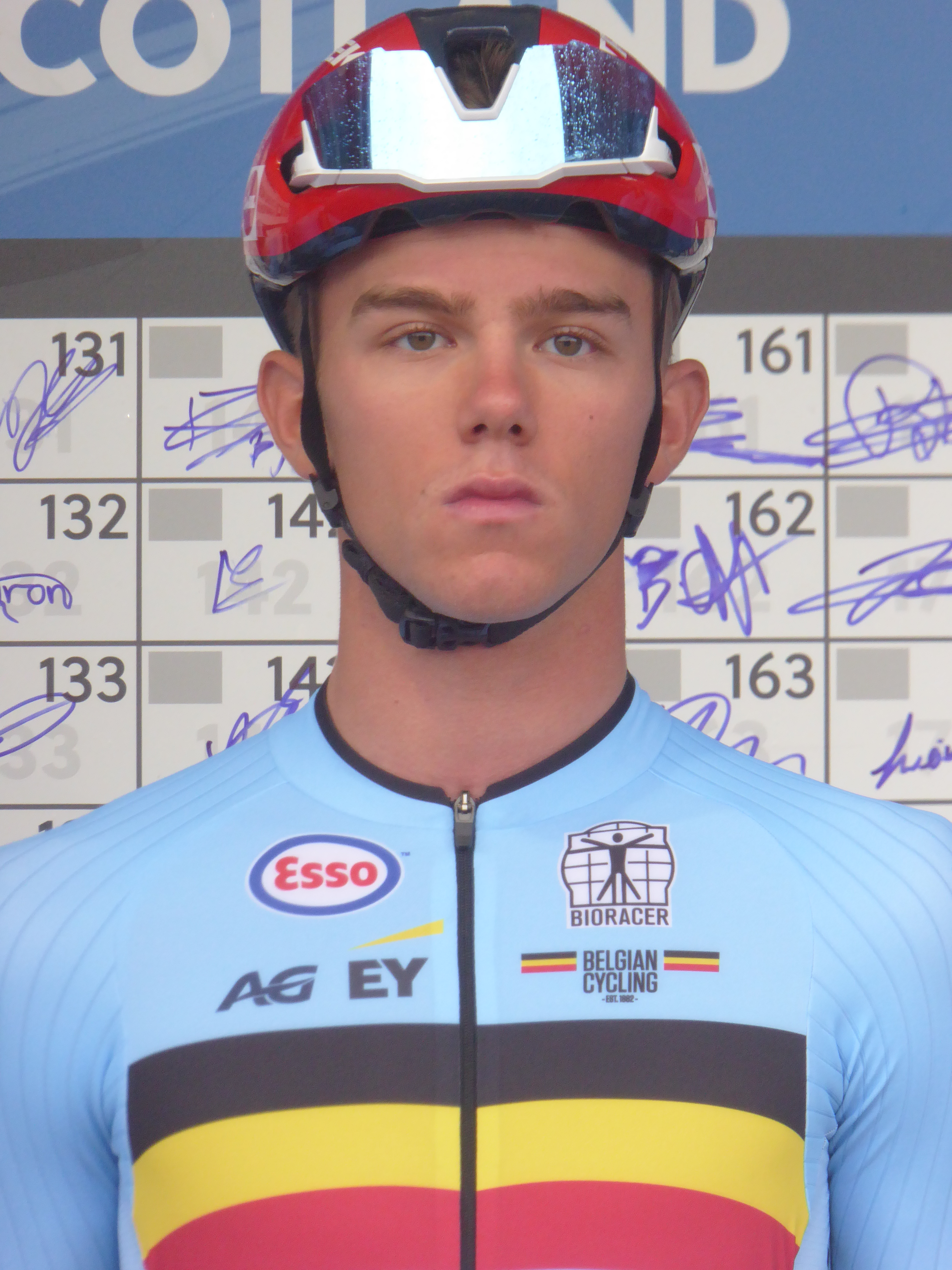
- Nys in 2023

Personal information
- Full name: Thibau Nys
- Born: 12 November 2002 (age 24) Bonheiden, Belgium
- Height: 1.76 m (5 ft 9 in)
- Weight: 64 kg (141 lb)

Cycling career
- Sport: Cycling
- Current team: Lidl–Trek (Road); Baloise Verzekeringen–Het Poetsbureau Lions (CX)
- Disciplines: Cyclo-cross; Road
- Role: Rider
- Rider type: Puncheur (road)

Amateur team
- 2019–2020: AA-Drink Jongerenteam

Professional teams
- 2021–: Baloise–Trek Lions (CX)
- 2023–: Trek–Segafredo (Road)

Major wins
- Cyclo-cross European Championships (2024, 2026) National Championships (2025, 2026) World Cup 5 individual wins (2023–24, 2024–25, 2025–26) Road Stage races Tour de Hongrie (2024) One-day races and Classics GP Miguel Induráin (2025)
Medal record
Representing Belgium
Men's cyclo-cross
World Championships
Gold medal – first place	2020 Dübendorf	Junior
Gold medal – first place	2023 Hoogerheide	Under-23
Bronze medal – third place	2022 Fayetteville	Under-23
Bronze medal – third place	2025 Liévin	Elite
Bronze medal – third place	2026 Hulst	Elite
European Championships
Gold medal – first place	2026 Zeddam	Elite
Gold medal – first place	2024 Pontevedra	Elite
Gold medal – first place	2019 Trebaseleghe	Junior
Silver medal – second place	2025 Middelkerke	Elite
Silver medal – second place	2022 Namur	Under-23
Bronze medal – third place	2021 Wijster	Under-23
Bronze medal – third place	2018 's-Hertogenbosch	Junior
Men's road bicycle racing
European Championships
Gold medal – first place	2021 Trentino	Under-23 road race

Thibau Nys (born 12 November 2002) is a Belgian cyclo-cross and road cyclist, who currently rides for UCI WorldTeam Lidl–Trek on the road and for UCI Cyclo-cross team Baloise Verzekeringen–Het Poetsbureau Lions in cyclo-cross.

== Career ==
Nys is the son of Sven Nys, one of the most successful cyclo-cross riders of all time.

Nys has followed in his father's footsteps and has started cyclo-cross from an early age on. He has already obtained three Belgian and one European cyclo-cross title in the youth categories. On 2 February 2020, he won the men's junior title at the 2020 UCI Cyclo-cross World Championships. On 11 September 2021, he added the men's U23 European Road Race Championships in Trento. As an Elite rider in the 2024/2025 season, Nys took his first European Championship and Belgium National title.

In March 2026, Nys underwent knee surgery, and missed the spring classics. He returned to racing at GP Gippengen, finishing fourth. Nys raced the Tour de Suisse, and the Belgian National Road Race Championships, finishing fifth in the latter. He was selected for the Vuelta a España.

== Major results ==
=== Cyclo-cross ===
2018–2019
Junior DVV Trophy

1st Hamme
1st Baal
1st Lille

Junior Superprestige

1st Hoogstraten
2nd Middelkerke
3rd Gieten
3rd Zonhoven

1st Junior Neerpelt
1st Junior Leuven
3rd Overall UCI Junior World Cup

1st Pontchâteau
2nd Tábor

3rd UEC European Junior Championships
3rd National Junior Championships
Junior Brico Cross

3rd Ronse

2019–2020
1st UCI World Junior Championships
1st UEC European Junior Championships
1st National Junior Championships
1st Overall UCI Junior World Cup

1st Bern
1st Tábor
1st Koksijde
1st Namur
1st Heusden-Zolder
1st Nommay
3rd Hoogerheide

1st Overall Junior Superprestige

1st Gieten
1st Gavere
1st Zonhoven
1st Diegem
1st Middelkerke
3rd Ruddervoorde

Junior DVV Trophy

1st Kortrijk
1st Baal
1st Lille

Junior Ethias Cross

1st Hulst
2nd Eeklo

Junior Rectavit Series

1st Neerpelt

1st Junior Waterloo
1st Junior Iowa City
2021–2022
Under-23 X²O Badkamers Trophy

1st Loenhout
1st Baal
1st Herentals
3rd Koppenberg
3rd Lille

3rd UCI World Under-23 Championships
3rd UEC European Under-23 Championships
3rd Oostmalle
2022–2023
1st UCI World Under-23 Championships
1st Overall UCI Under-23 World Cup

1st Tábor
1st Maasmechelen
1st Zonhoven
1st Benidorm

2nd UEC European Under-23 Championships
3rd National Championships
UCI World Cup

5th Waterloo
5th Fayetteville

2023–2024 (3 pro wins)
UCI World Cup

1st Waterloo
3rd Benidorm
4th Hoogerheide

X²O Badkamers Trophy

1st Koppenberg

Exact Cross

1st Beringen

2024–2025 (5)
1st UEC European Championships
1st National Championships
UCI World Cup

1st Benidorm
2nd Zonhoven
3rd Gavere

Superprestige

1st Overijse
3rd Diegem

X²O Badkamers Trophy

1st Lokeren

Exact Cross

2nd Loenhout

3rd UCI World Championships
2025–2026 (6)
1st National Championships
X²O Badkamers Trophy

1st Koppenberg
1st Hamme
3rd Baal

2nd Overall UCI World Cup

1st Tábor
1st Flamanville
1st Dendermonde
2nd Namur
2nd Gavere
2nd Benidorm
4th Maasmechelen
4th Hoogerheide

2nd UEC European Championships
3rd UCI World Championships
Superprestige

3rd Diegem

2026–2027 (3)
1st UEC European Championships
X²O Trophy

1st Koppenberg
1st Hamme–Zogge
1st Beringen

==== UCI World Cup results ====
Season	1	2	3	4	5	6	7	8	9	10	11	12	13	14	15	16	Rank	Points
2021–2022	WAT; DNF	FAY —	IOW —	ZON —	OVE —	TAB —	KOK; 19	ANT —	BES —	VAL —	RUC —	NAM —	DEN —	HUL —	FLA —	HOO —	59	7
2022–2023	WAT; 5	FAY; 5	TAB —	MAA —	BER; 36	OVE; 6	HUL —	ANT; 25	DUB —	VAL —	GAV; 7	ZON —	BEN —	BES —			21	82
2023–2024	WAT; 1	MAA; 7	DEN —	TRO; 7	DUB; 6	FLA; 19	VAL —	NAM —	ANT; 9	GAV; 13	HUL —	ZON; 12	BEN; 3	HOO; 4			10	196
2024–2025	ANT; 12	DUB; DNF	CAB; NH	NAM; 11	HUL; 16	ZON; 2	GAV; 3	BES —	DEN; 8	BEN; 1	MAA —	HOO; DNF					10	152
2025–2026	TAB; 1	FLA; 1	TER —	NAM; 2	ANT; 23	KOK —	GAV; 2	DEN; 1	ZON; 19	BEN; 2	MAA; 4	HOO; 4					2	264

=== Road ===
2021
1st Road race, UEC European Under-23 Championships
Ronde Vlaams-Brabant

1st Stages 1 & 2

2nd Road race, National Under-23 Championships
2nd Overall Tour de Namur

1st Stages 1 & 5

6th Road race, UCI World Under-23 Championships
2022
1st Overall Flèche du Sud

1st Young rider classification
1st Stage 3

3rd Antwerp Port Epic
2023 (2 pro wins)
1st Grand Prix of Aargau Canton
3rd Overall Tour of Norway

1st Points classification
1st Stage 2

2024 (9)
1st Overall Tour de Hongrie

1st Points classification
1st Stages 3 & 4

Tour de Pologne

1st Stages 1, 3 & 6

1st Stage 2 Tour de Romandie
1st Stage 3 Tour de Suisse
1st Stage 1 Tour of Norway
4th Road race, National Championships
5th Bretagne Classic
2025 (1)
1st GP Miguel Induráin
2nd GP Gippingen
5th Liège–Bastogne–Liège
8th La Flèche Wallonne
2026
4th GP Gippingen
5th Road race, National Championships

==== Grand Tour general classification results timeline ====
Grand Tour	2025	2026
Giro d'Italia	—	—
Tour de France	116	—
Vuelta a España	—	112
