= 2020–21 UCI Cyclo-cross World Cup =

Bicycle racing competition

Details
- Location: Belgium; Czech Republic; ~~Ireland~~; ~~France~~; Netherlands; ~~Switzerland~~; ~~United States~~
- Races: ~~14~~ 5

Champions
- Male individual champion: Wout van Aert (BEL) (Team Jumbo–Visma)
- Female individual champion: Lucinda Brand (NED) (Baloise–Trek Lions)

The 2020–21 Telenet UCI Cyclo-cross World Cup was a season long cyclo-cross competition, organised by the Union Cycliste Internationale (UCI). The UCI Cyclo-cross World Cup took place between 4 October 2020 and 24 January 2021. In 2020, the UCI redesigned the UCI Cyclo-cross World Cup, expanding the total number of races to 14 (initially aiming for 16). The defending champions were Toon Aerts in the men's competition and Annemarie Worst in the women's competition.

== Points distribution ==
Points were awarded to all eligible riders at each race. From this season, the points awarded are according to the same scale for all categories, but only the top 25 riders receive points rather than the top 50. The top ten finishers received points according to the following table:

Points awarded
| Position | 1 | 2 | 3 | 4 | 5 | 6 | 7 | 8 | 9 | 10 |
| Elite riders | 40 | 30 | 25 | 22 | 21 | 20 | 19 | 18 | 17 | 16 |

- Riders finishing in positions 11 to 25 also received points, going down from 15 points for 11th place by one point per place to 1 point for 25th place.
- Note that the points given here are entirely different from the UCI ranking points, which are distributed according to a different scale and determine starting order in races, but have no impact on World Cup standings.

== Events ==
In comparison to last season, intention was to expand the season from nine to fourteen races. The calendar included new races in Antwerp, Besançon, Diegem, Dublin, Hulst, Overijse, Villars, Dendermonde and Zonhoven, while the races in Bern, Heusden-Zolder, Iowa and Nommay were dropped.

Due to the COVID-19 pandemic however, the races in Besançon, Diegem, Dublin, Hoogerheide, Duinencross Koksijde, Villars, Waterloo and Zonhoven were cancelled and the cross in Antwerp was dropped from the World Cup and instead integrated into the X²O Badkamers Trophy. As a result, only five races remained.

| Date | Race | Location | Winners | | | | |
| Date | Race | Location | Elite men | Elite women | Under-23 men | Junior men | Junior women |
|---|---|---|---|---|---|---|---|
| 4 October 2020 | World Cup Waterloo | Waterloo, United States | Cancelled due to the COVID-19 pandemic | | | | |
| 18 October 2020 | Cyclo-cross Dublin | (Republic of Ireland) Dublin, Ireland | Cancelled due to the COVID-19 pandemic | | | | |
| 25 October 2020 | Cyclo-cross Zonhoven | Zonhoven, Belgium | Cancelled due to the COVID-19 pandemic | | | | |
| 22 November 2020 | Duinencross Koksijde | Koksijde, Belgium | Cancelled due to the COVID-19 pandemic | | | | |
| 29 November 2020 | Cyclo-cross Besançon | Besançon, France | Cancelled due to the COVID-19 pandemic | | | | |
| 29 November 2020 | Cyklokros Tábor | Tábor, Czech Republic | Michael Vanthourenhout (BEL) | Lucinda Brand (NED) | Thomas Mein (GBR) | Matěj Stránský (CZE) | Zoe Bäckstedt (GBR) |
| 13 December 2020 | Scheldecross Antwerpen | Antwerp, Belgium | Cancelled due to the COVID-19 pandemic | | | | |
| 20 December 2020 | Citadelcross | Namur, Belgium | Mathieu van der Poel (NED) | Lucinda Brand (NED) | No under-23 or junior races | | |
| 27 December 2020 | Cyclo-cross Diegem | Diegem, Belgium | Cancelled due to the COVID-19 pandemic | | | | |
| 27 December 2020 | Ambiancecross | Dendermonde, Belgium | Wout van Aert (BEL) | Lucinda Brand (NED) | No under-23 or junior races | | |
| 3 January 2021 | Vestingcross | Perkpolder, Netherlands | Mathieu van der Poel (NED) | Denise Betsema (NED) | No under-23 or junior races | | |
| 17 January 2021 | Cyclo-cross Villars | Villars, Switzerland | Cancelled due to the COVID-19 pandemic | | | | |
| 24 January 2021 | Grand Prix Adri van der Poel | Hoogerheide, Netherlands | Cancelled due to the COVID-19 pandemic | | | | |
| 24 January 2021 | Vlaamse Druivenveldrit Overijse | Overijse, Belgium | Wout van Aert (BEL) | Ceylin del Carmen Alvarado (NED) | No under-23 or junior races | | |

== Final points standings ==
=== Elite men ===
| Pos. | Rider | TAB (Czech Republic) | NAM (Belgium) | DEN (Belgium) | HUL (Netherlands) | OVE (Belgium) | Points |
|---|---|---|---|---|---|---|---|
| 1 | Wout van Aert (BEL) | 3 | 2 | 1 | 2 | 1 | 165 |
| 2 | Mathieu van der Poel (NED) | DNS | 1 | 2 | 1 | 2 | 140 |
| 3 | Michael Vanthourenhout (BEL) | 1 | 4 | 4 | 4 | 4 | 128 |
| 4 | Toon Aerts (BEL) | 4 | 7 | 3 | 5 | 5 | 108 |
| 5 | Quinten Hermans (BEL) | 7 | 5 | 7 | 7 | 9 | 95 |
| 6 | Corné van Kessel (NED) | 6 | 9 | 6 | 10 | 8 | 91 |
| 7 | Tom Pidcock (GBR) | 17 | 3 | Ret | 3 | 3 | 84 |
| 8 | Lars van der Haar (NED) | 5 | 6 | Ret | 6 | 6 | 81 |
| 9 | Laurens Sweeck (BEL) | 14 | 19 | 5 | 8 | 7 | 77 |
| 10 | Kevin Kuhn (SUI) | 9 | 15 | 14 | 16 | 13 | 63 |
| 11 | Gianni Vermeersch (BEL) | DNS | 12 | 10 | 12 | 10 | 60 |
| 12 | Thijs Aerts (BEL) | 13 | 14 | 9 | 14 | DNS | 54 |
| 13 | Daan Soete (BEL) | 8 | 8 | 32 | 15 | 20 | 53 |
| 14 | Ryan Kamp (NED) | DNS | 10 | 20 | 9 | 12 | 53 |
| 15 | Joris Nieuwenhuis (NED) | DNS | 11 | 16 | 13 | 17 | 47 |
| 16 | Pim Ronhaar (NED) | DNS | 37 | 8 | 11 | 15 | 44 |
| 17 | Tim Merlier (BEL) | DNS | DNS | 15 | 17 | 14 | 32 |
| 18 | Eli Iserbyt (BEL) | 2 | 31 | DNS | Ret | DNS | 30 |
| 19 | Timo Kielich (BEL) | DNS | 16 | DNS | 22 | 11 | 29 |
| 20 | Ben Turner (GBR) | DNS | 23 | 11 | 20 | Ret | 24 |
| 21 | Curtis White (USA) | DNS | 28 | 13 | 21 | 22 | 22 |
| 22 | Joshua Dubau (FRA) | 18 | 13 | Ret | DNS | 29 | 21 |
| 23 | Thomas Mein (GBR) | DNS | 27 | 12 | Ret | 21 | 19 |
| 24 | Toon Vandebosch (BEL) | DNS | 18 | 25 | DNS | 16 | 19 |
| 25 | Diether Sweeck (BEL) | 10 | 24 | 34 | DNS | DNS | 18 |
| 26 | David Menut (FRA) | 12 | 25 | Ret | 24 | DNS | 17 |
| 27 | Vincent Baestaens (BEL) | 11 | DNS | 28 | 26 | DNS | 15 |
| 28 | Timon Ruegg (SUI) | 19 | 22 | 33 | 23 | 26 | 14 |
| 29 | Jakob Dorigoni (ITA) | 15 | DNS | DNS | DNS | 24 | 13 |
| 30 | Felipe Orts (ESP) | DNS | 20 | 26 | 30 | 19 | 13 |
| 31 | Mees Hendrikx (NED) | DNS | 17 | 24 | 25 | 27 | 12 |
| 32 | Anton Ferdinande (BEL) | DNS | DNS | 22 | 18 | 28 | 12 |
| 33 | Tim van Dijke (NED) | DNS | Ret | 18 | DNS | 23 | 11 |
| 34 | Marcel Meisen (GER) | 20 | 21 | Ret | DNS | DNS | 11 |
| 35 | Kevin Suárez Fernández (ESP) | 16 | 34 | Ret | 33 | 38 | 10 |
| 36 | Michael van den Ham (CAN) | DNS | 40 | 17 | 34 | DNS | 9 |
| 37 | David van der Poel (NED) | 22 | 49 | 21 | 28 | 42 | 9 |
| 38 | Niels Vandeputte (BEL) | DNS | DNS | DNS | DNS | 18 | 8 |
| 39 | Yentl Bekaert (BEL) | DNS | DNS | DNS | 19 | DNS | 7 |
| 40 | Yan Gras (FRA) | 27 | 32 | 19 | DNS | 33 | 7 |
| 41 | Steve Chainel (FRA) | 21 | Ret | 39 | DNS | DNS | 5 |
| 42 | Gioele Bertolini (ITA) | 23 | DNS | DNS | DNS | 25 | 4 |
| 43 | Michael Boroš (CZE) | 26 | 26 | 23 | 29 | 30 | 3 |
| 44 | Stan Godrie (NED) | 24 | 30 | 27 | 42 | 35 | 2 |
| 45 | Nicolas Samparisi (ITA) | 25 | 46 | 31 | 40 | DNS | 1 |

=== Elite women ===
| Pos. | Rider | TAB (Czech Republic) | NAM (Belgium) | DEN (Belgium) | HUL (Netherlands) | OVE (Belgium) | Points |
|---|---|---|---|---|---|---|---|
| 1 | Lucinda Brand (NED) | 1 | 1 | 1 | 2 | 2 | 180 |
| 2 | Ceylin del Carmen Alvarado (NED) | 2 | 4 | 3 | 3 | 1 | 142 |
| 3 | Denise Betsema (NED) | 3 | 3 | 8 | 1 | 5 | 129 |
| 4 | Clara Honsinger (USA) | DNS | 2 | 2 | 6 | 4 | 102 |
| 5 | Kata Blanka Vas (HUN) | 4 | 5 | 7 | 5 | 9 | 100 |
| 6 | Sanne Cant (BEL) | 12 | 12 | 6 | 8 | 6 | 86 |
| 7 | Annemarie Worst (NED) | 5 | DNS | 5 | 4 | 11 | 79 |
| 8 | Manon Bakker (NED) | DNS | 14 | 9 | 9 | 3 | 71 |
| 9 | Puck Pieterse (NED) | 6 | 11 | 23 | 7 | 17 | 66 |
| 10 | Anna Kay (GBR) | 9 | 7 | 30 | 18 | 7 | 63 |
| 11 | Fem Van Empel (NED) | DNS | 18 | 4 | 10 | 12 | 60 |
| 12 | Alice Maria Arzuffi (ITA) | 8 | 15 | 12 | 13 | 23 | 59 |
| 13 | Aniek van Alphen (NED) | DNS | 8 | 16 | 12 | 14 | 54 |
| 14 | Yara Kastelijn (NED) | 10 | Ret | 10 | 17 | 16 | 51 |
| 15 | Marianne Vos (NED) | DNS | DNS | 14 | 11 | 10 | 43 |
| 16 | Eva Lechner (ITA) | 26 | 10 | 13 | DNS | 13 | 42 |
| 17 | Evie Richards (GBR) | DNS | 6 | DNS | DNS | 8 | 38 |
| 18 | Perrine Clauzel (FRA) | 16 | 9 | 45 | 23 | 18 | 38 |
| 19 | Christine Majerus (LUX) | DNS | 13 | 11 | DNS | 21 | 33 |
| 20 | Alicia Franck (BEL) | 13 | 21 | 28 | 19 | 19 | 32 |
| 21 | Laura Verdonschot (BEL) | 7 | Ret | 29 | 15 | DNS | 30 |
| 22 | Marion Norbert-Riberolle (FRA) | 20 | 35 | 19 | 24 | 15 | 26 |
| 23 | Inge van der Heijden (NED) | 19 | 17 | 24 | 22 | Ret | 22 |
| 24 | Maghalie Rochette (CAN) | 11 | Ret | 27 | 20 | 29 | 21 |
| 25 | Sophie de Boer (NED) | 18 | 24 | 21 | 21 | Ret | 20 |
| 26 | Anne Tauber (NED) | DNS | DNS | DNS | 14 | 20 | 18 |
| 27 | Madigan Munro (USA) | DNS | 19 | 15 | 37 | 27 | 18 |
| 28 | Lotte Kopecky (BEL) | DNS | DNS | 18 | 16 | DNS | 18 |
| 29 | Hélène Clauzel (FRA) | 33 | 16 | 22 | DNS | 24 | 16 |
| 30 | Francesca Baroni (ITA) | 14 | DNS | DNS | DNS | 30 | 12 |
| 31 | Lucía González Blanco (ESP) | 15 | Ret | 42 | 26 | 43 | 11 |
| 32 | Rebecca Fahringer (USA) | DNS | 32 | 17 | 28 | 28 | 9 |
| 33 | Gaia Realini (ITA) | 17 | DNS | DNS | DNS | 26 | 9 |
| 34 | Harriet Harnden (GBR) | DNS | 20 | DNS | 27 | 25 | 7 |
| 35 | Kaitlin Keough (USA) | DNS | 30 | 20 | 30 | 39 | 6 |
| 36 | Josie Nelson (GBR) | 21 | 39 | DNS | DNS | DNS | 5 |
| 37 | Silvio Persico (ITA) | 47 | 45 | 44 | DNS | 22 | 4 |
| 38 | Marlène Petit (FRA) | DNS | 22 | 41 | DNS | DNS | 4 |
| 39 | Marthe Truyen (BEL) | 22 | 40 | 34 | 33 | 41 | 4 |
| 40 | Ellen Van Loy (BEL) | 23 | 29 | 37 | 25 | 31 | 4 |
| 41 | Ruby West (CAN) | DNS | 23 | 31 | DNS | 32 | 3 |
| 42 | Zina Barhoumi (SUI) | 24 | 26 | 35 | DNS | 49 | 2 |
| 43 | Katie Compton (USA) | 31 | 25 | 25 | 49 | 42 | 2 |
| 44 | Joyce Vanderbeken (BEL) | 25 | 28 | 33 | 34 | 50 | 1 |
