= Cyclo-cross Dublin =

Cyclo-cross race in Dublin, Ireland

Race details
- Region: Dublin, Republic of Ireland
- Discipline: Cyclo-cross
- Competition: UCI World Cup

History
- First edition: 2022
- Editions: 3 (as of 2025)
- First winner: Wout van Aert (BEL)
- Most recent: Michael Vanthourenhout (BEL)

The Cyclo-cross Dublin was a professional cyclo-cross race held annually in Dublin, Ireland. Since 2022 the event had been part of the UCI Cyclo-cross World Cup, making it the first World Cup cyclo-cross race hosted in Ireland.

Together with Cyclo-cross Benidorm, Cyclo-cross Benidorm debuted on the UCI Cyclo-cross World Cup calendar during the 2022–23 season, with the first race held in December 2022.

Despite the enthusiasm about the race from a wide race of cyclo-cross riders, Sport Ireland decided to end the race in February 2025. The organization cited the significant costs and the need to support a range of additional categories as factors in the decision. The last edition also attracted fewer spectators.

"“I really like it, to be honest. This is like a cyclo cross course should be. It’s wide, and the weather is all depending on how the race will evolve and how how hard it is, how difficult the technical parts are."

—Thibau Nys on the Cyclo-cross Dublin

== Winners ==
=== Male ===
Year	Winner	Second	Third
2024	Michael Vanthourenhout (BEL)	Toon Aerts (BEL)	Felipe Orts (ESP)
2023	Pim Ronhaar (NED)	Laurens Sweeck (BEL)	Eli Iserbyt (BEL)
2022	Wout van Aert (BEL)	Laurens Sweeck (BEL)	Tom Pidcock (GBR)

=== Female ===
Year	Winner	Second	Third
2024	Lucinda Brand (NED)	Fem van Empel (NED)	Zoe Backstedt (GBR)
2023	Lucinda Brand (NED)	Ceylin del Carmen Alvarado (NED)	Zoe Backstedt (GBR)
2022	Fem van Empel (NED)	Puck Pieterse (NED)	Denise Betsema (NED)
