= Blanka Vas =

Hungarian cyclist (born 2001)

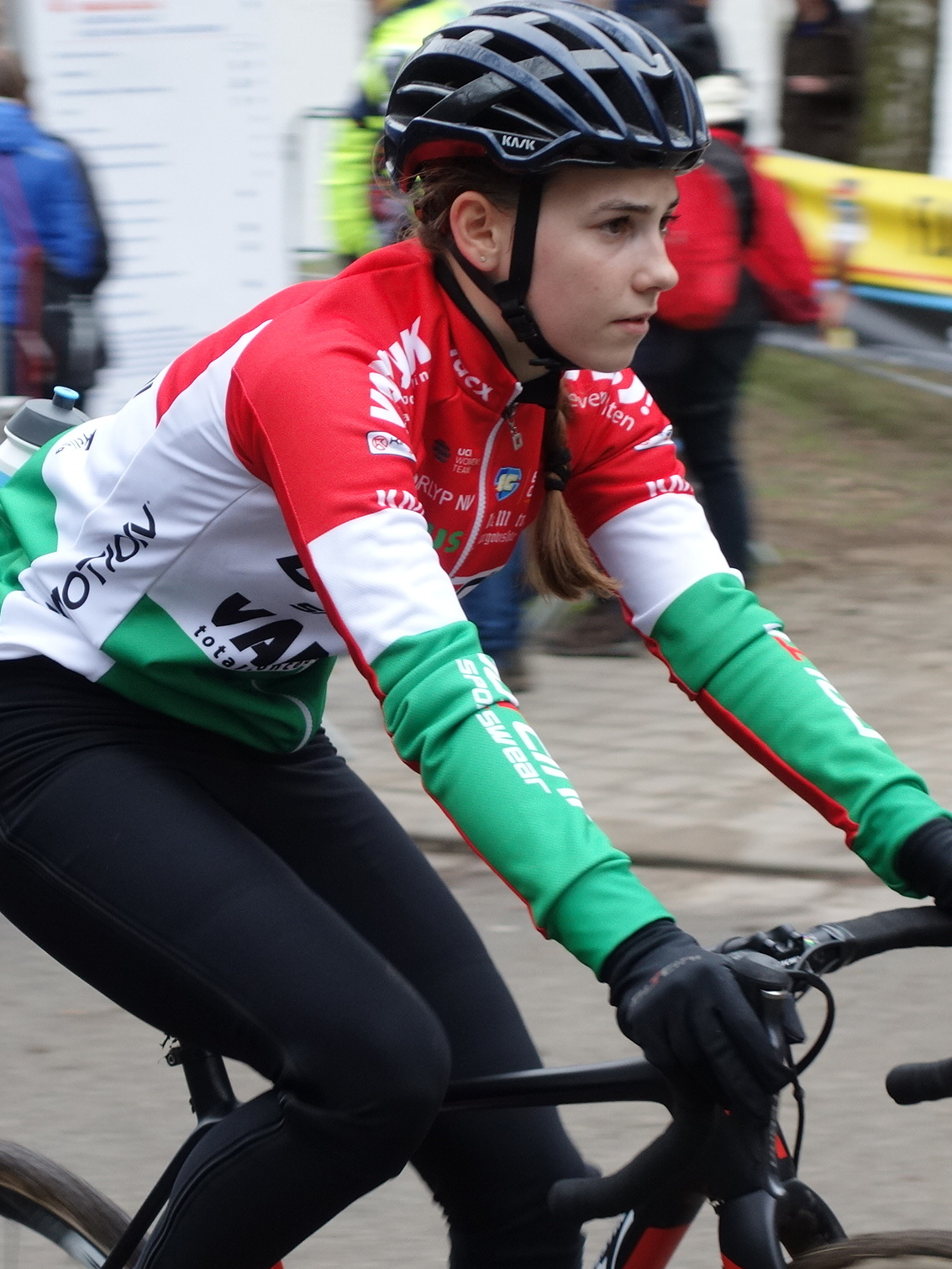
- Vas in 2020

Personal information
- Born: 3 September 2001 (age 25) Budapest, Hungary
- Height: 1.63 m (5 ft 4 in)

Cycling career
- Sport: Cycling
- Current team: Team SD Worx–Protime
- Disciplines: Road; Cyclo-cross; Mountain biking
- Role: Rider

Professional teams
- 2019–2021: Doltcini–Van Eyck Sport
- 2021–: SD Worx

Major wins
- Cyclo-cross National Championships (2019–2025) World Cup 2 individual wins (2021–22, 2024–25) Mountain bike National XC Championships (2020, 2021, 2023) Road Major Tours Tour de France 1 individual stage (2024) Giro Donne 1 individual stage (2023) One-day races and classics National Road Race Championships (2020, 2021, 2022, 2023, 2024, 2025) National Time Trial Championships (2021, 2022, 2023)
Medal record
Representing Hungary
Women's cyclo-cross
World Championships
Silver medal – second place	2020 Dübendorf	Under-23
Bronze medal – third place	2021 Ostend	Under-23
European Championships
Silver medal – second place	2021 Wijster	Elite
Silver medal – second place	2020 's-Hertogenbosch	Under-23
Bronze medal – third place	2022 Namur	Elite
Women's Mountain Bike
World Championships
Silver medal – second place	2020 Leogang	Under-23 Cross-country
Women's road cycling
World Championships
Gold medal – first place	2023 Glasgow	Under-23 road race
European Championships
Silver medal – second place	2021 Trentino	Under-23 road race

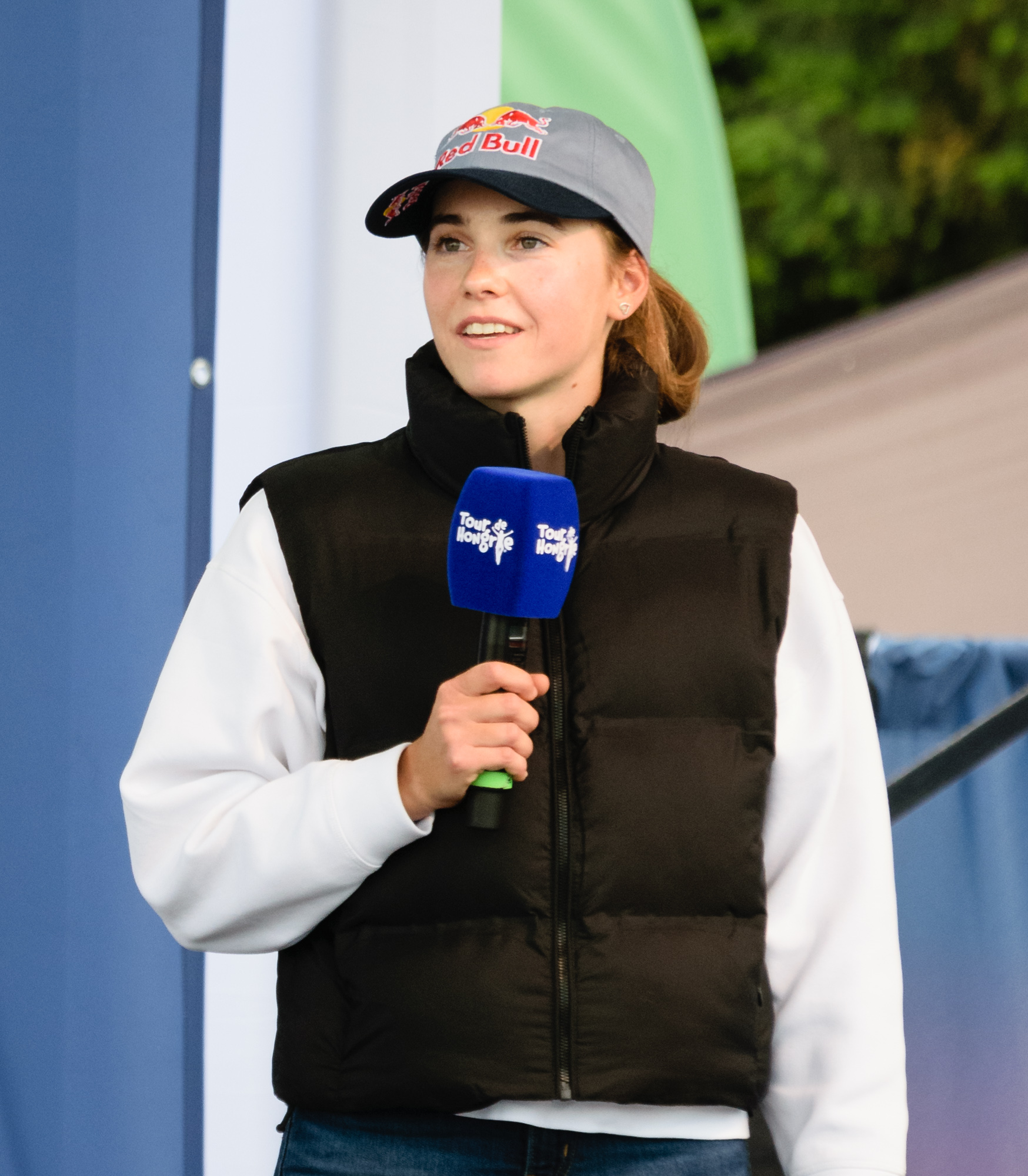
Vas being interviewed on the 0th day of 2025 Tour de Hongrie

Blanka Kata Vas (Hungarian pronunciation: [ˈblɒŋkɒ ˈkɒtɒ ˈvɒʃ]; born 3 September 2001) is a Hungarian professional racing cyclist, who currently rides for UCI Women's WorldTeam SD Worx.

== Career ==
She rode in the women's road race event at the 2020 UCI Road World Championships, and in the women's cross-country event at the 2020 Summer Olympics.

In June 2021, Vas joined UCI Women's WorldTeam SD Worx on a two-year contract. She previously rode for UCI Women's Continental Team Doltcini–Van Eyck–Proximus.

== Major results ==
=== Cyclo-cross ===
2017–2018
2nd National Championships
2nd Dolná Krupa
2018–2019
1st National Championships
2nd Poprad
2019–2020
1st National Championships
2nd UCI World Under-23 Championships
Ethias Cross

2nd Essen

2nd Ternitz
2nd Topolcianky
Rectavit Series

3rd Sint-Niklaas

3rd Podbrezová
2020–2021
1st National Championships
Ethias Cross

1st Bredene

Toi Toi Cup

1st Rýmařov

Bryksy Cross

1st Gościęcin

1st Gullegem
2nd UEC European Under-23 Championships
3rd UCI World Under-23 Championships
UCI World Cup

4th Tábor
5th Hulst
5th Namur

2021–2022
1st National Championships
UCI World Cup

1st Overijse
3rd Iowa City
3rd Flamanville
4th Hulst
5th Hoogerheide

2nd UEC European Championships
X²O Badkamers Trophy

3rd Koppenberg

2022–2023
1st National Championships
1st Ardooie
1st Woerden
Toi Toi Cup

1st Holé Vrchy
1st Hlinsko
1st Jičín

2nd Oisterwijk
3rd UEC European Championships
UCI World Cup

5th Tábor
5th Maasmechelen
5th Gavere
5th Besançon

2023–2024
1st Oisterwijk
UCI World Cup

2nd Hoogerheide
5th Gavere
5th Benidorm

2024–2025
3rd Overall UCI World Cup

1st Maasmechelen
2nd Hoogerheide
3rd Besançon
4th Namur
4th Gavere
5th Dublin
5th Benidorm

5th UCI World Championships
2025–2026
Superprestige

2nd Heusden-Zolder
4th Diegem

4th UCI World Championships
UCI World Cup

4th Gavere

=== Mountain bike ===
2019
1st Cross-country, National Junior Championships
4th Cross-country, UCI World Junior Championships
4th Cross-country, UEC European Junior Championships
2020
National Championships

1st Marathon
1st Cross-country

2nd Cross-country, UCI World Under-23 Championships
2021
1st Cross-country, National Championships
UCI Under-23 XCO World Cup

2nd Leogang
3rd Albstadt
3rd Nové Město

Slovak Cup

1st Drozdovo

Izomat Cup

1st Zadov

4th Cross-country, Olympic Games
5th Cross-country, UCI World Under-23 Championships
2023
National Championships

1st Cross-country
1st Short track

5th Cross-country, UCI World Under-23 Championships

=== Road ===
2018
Youth Olympic Games

1st Criterium
3rd Girls' combined
5th Road race

2019
National Junior Championships

1st Road race
2nd Time trial

V4 Ladies Series

6th Restart Zalaegerszeg
10th Pannonhalma

7th Road race, UCI World Junior Championships
2020 (1 pro win)
National Championships

1st Road race
2nd Time trial

5th Trophée des Grimpeuses
6th Road race, UEC European Under-23 Championships
7th Grand Prix International d'Isbergues
2021 (2)
National Championships

1st Time trial
1st Road race

2nd Road race, UEC European Under-23 Championships
4th Road race, UCI World Championships
9th Overall Challenge by La Vuelta
2022 (2)
National Championships

1st Road race
1st Time trial

2nd Time trial Postnord Vårgårda WestSweden
8th GP de Plouay
Giro Donne

Held after Stage 1

2023 (4)
1st Road race, UCI Road World Under-23 Championships
National Championships

1st Road race
1st Time trial

1st Stage 8 Giro Donne
1st Stage 1 Tour de Suisse
2024 (2)
1st Road race, National Championships
1st Stage 5 Tour de France
4th Road race, Olympic Games
8th Road race, UEC European Championships
10th Road race, UCI World Championships
La Vuelta Femenina

Held after Stages 2–3
Held after Stages 3–4

2025
1st Road race, National Championships
1st Stage 3 Tour de Romandie
2nd Trofeo Alfredo Binda
2026
4th Trofeo Alfredo Binda

==== General classification results ====
Major Tours	2021	2022	2023	2024	2025	2026
La Vuelta Femenina	9	28	75	57	—	—
Giro Rosa	—	51	43	41	—	—
Tour de France Femmes	DNE	—	—	63	76	
Stage race	2021	2022	2023	2024	2025	2026
Festival Elsy Jacobs	—	15	—	—	—	
Tour of Scandinavia	—	18	—	NH		
Itzulia Women	NH	—	14	42	—	63
Vuelta a Burgos Feminas	—	—	21	—	—	82
Tour de Suisse	—	—	33	—	44	—
Tour de Romandie Féminin	NH	—	—	—	42	

==== Classics results timeline ====
Monument	2022	2023	2024	2025	2026
Liège–Bastogne–Liège	30	—	80	—	—
Tour of Flanders	—	—	—	45	—
Paris–Roubaix	—	—	—	53	17
Classic	2022	2023	2024	2025	2026
Classic Lorient Agglomération	8	—	—	51	
Amstel Gold Race	24	—	83	59	22
La Flèche Wallonne	40	—	DNF	—	—
Open de Suède Vårgårda	28	NH			
Brabantse Pijl	—	36	86	—	—
Trofeo Alfredo Binda	—	—	—	2	4
Milan–San Remo	—	—	—	27	60
Strade Bianche Donne	—	—	—	DNF	—
Tour of Flanders	—	—	—	—	66

==== Major championships results ====
Event		2020	2021	2022	2023	2024	2025	2026
Olympic Games	Road race	NH	—	NH		4	NH	
World Championships	Road race	54	4	—	11	10	37	
European Championships	Road race	—	—	—	—	8	—	
National Championships	Time trial	2	1	1	1	—	—	—
National Championships	Road race	1	1	1	1	1	1	—

Legend
—	Did not compete
DNF	Did not finish
OTL	Outside time limit
DNE	Did not exist
IP	In progress
NH	Not held
