= 2024–25 UCI Cyclo-cross World Cup =

Bicycle racing competition

- Thirty-second edition of the UCI Cyclo-cross World Cup

Details
- Dates: 24 November 2024 – 26 January 2025
- Location: Belgium; Ireland; Italy (Cancelled); Netherlands; France; Spain
- Races: 11

Champions
- Male individual champion: Michael Vanthourenhout (BEL) Elite; Tibor Del Grosso (NED) U-23; Soren Bruyère Joumard (FRA) Junior
- Female individual champion: Lucinda Brand (NED) Elite; Zoe Backstedt (GBR) U-23; Rafaelle Carrier (CAN) Junior

Location of the blue elite races, red all category crosses and gray cancelled races. (Enlarge and zoom map to spot all locations.)

The 2024–25 UCI Cyclo-cross World Cup was the 32nd edition of UCI Cyclo-cross World Cup. It was a season-long cyclo-cross competition, organized by the Union Cycliste Internationale (UCI) and Flanders Classics, that took place between 24 November 2024 and 26 January 2025.

The defending champions in the Elite category were Eli Iserbyt in the men's competition and Ceylin del Carmen Alvarado in the women's competition.

== Points distribution ==
Points were awarded to all eligible riders at each race. The points awarded are according to the same scale for all categories, but only the top 25 riders receive points rather than the top 50. The top ten finishers received points according to the following table:

Points awarded
Position	1	2	3	4	5	6	7	8	9	10
Elite riders	40	30	25	22	21	20	19	18	17	16

- Riders finishing in positions 11 to 25 also received points, going down from 15 points for 11th place by one point per place to 1 point for 25th place.
- Note that the points given here are entirely different from the UCI ranking points, which are distributed according to a different scale and determine starting order in races, but have no impact on World Cup standings.

== Race Categories ==
There were races in 5 categories Elite Men, Elite Women, Under-23 Men, Junior Men and Junior Women. There was no separate race for Under-23 Women but the riders in this category took part in the Elite Women race. There were separate classification in all 6 above categories.

== Calendar ==
In total there were 11 World Cup events held during the season. Originally there were 12 World Cup events planned but the third round race in Sardinia was cancelled due to the bad weather. All events included Elite Women and Elite Men races, but only 6 of the 11 events included an Under-23 or Junior race.

Compared to the previous editions some changes to the calendar and format of the World Cup were announced by UCI. Most notably, the number of races was reduced from 14 to 12 to allow for a more compact season. Moreover, UCI assigned protected event status to some of the events which meant that UCI would not sanction any other international cyclo-cross event the day before or on the day in which a protected event was held.

#	Date	Race	Location	Categories
1	24 November	Scheldecross Antwerpen	(Belgium) Antwerp	Elite
2	1 December	Cyclo-cross Dublin^{*}	(Republic of Ireland) Dublin	All
3	8 December	Cyclo-cross Cabras-Sardinia^{*}	(Italy) Cabras	~~Elite~~ Cancelled due to the bad weather
4	15 December	Citadelcross Namur	(Belgium) Namur	Elite
5	21 December	Vestingcross^{*}	(Netherlands) Hulst	All
6	22 December	Cyclo-cross Zonhoven	(Belgium) Zonhoven	All
7	26 December	Cyclo-cross Gavere	(Belgium) Gavere	Elite
8	29 December	Cyclo-cross Besançon^{*}	(France) Besançon	All
9	5 January	Ambiancecross	(Belgium) Dendermonde	Elite
10	19 January	Cyclo-cross Benidorm	(Spain) Benidorm	All
11	25 January	Cyclo-cross Maasmechelen	(Belgium) Maasmechelen	Elite
12	26 January	Grand Prix Adrie van der Poel	(Netherlands) Hoogerheide	All

^{*} Protected event: There were no other races on the UCI International Calendar the day before or on the day of the event.

== Results ==
=== Elite Men ===
==== Race results ====
Date	Race	Distance	Winner	Second	Third	Competition leader
24 November	(Belgium) Antwerp	25.68 km	Eli Iserbyt (BEL)	Laurens Sweeck (BEL)	Michael Vanthourenhout (BEL)	Eli Iserbyt (BEL)
1 December	(Republic of Ireland) Dublin	24.88 km	Michael Vanthourenhout (BEL)	Toon Aerts (BEL)	Felipe Orts (ESP)	Michael Vanthourenhout (BEL)
8 December	(Italy) Cabras-Sardinia	Cancelled due to the bad weather				Michael Vanthourenhout (BEL)
15 December	(Belgium) Namur	22.30 km	Michael Vanthourenhout (BEL)	Toon Aerts (BEL)	Emiel Verstrynge (BEL)	Michael Vanthourenhout (BEL)
21 December	(Netherlands) Hulst	20.41 km	Niels Vandeputte (BEL)	Felipe Orts (ESP)	Pim Ronhaar (NED)	Michael Vanthourenhout (BEL)
22 December	(Belgium) Zonhoven	24.88 km	Mathieu van der Poel (NED)	Thibau Nys (BEL)	Joran Wyseure (BEL)	Michael Vanthourenhout (BEL)
26 December	(Belgium) Gavere	20.40 km	Mathieu van der Poel (NED)	Michael Vanthourenhout (BEL)	Thibau Nys (BEL)	Michael Vanthourenhout (BEL)
29 December	(France) Besançon	21.45 km	Mathieu van der Poel (NED)	Toon Aerts (BEL)	Niels Vandeputte (BEL)	Michael Vanthourenhout (BEL)
5 January	(Belgium) Dendermonde	20.07 km	Wout van Aert (BEL)	Emiel Verstrynge (BEL)	Joran Wyseure (BEL)	Michael Vanthourenhout (BEL)
19 January	(Spain) Benidorm	25.68 km	Thibau Nys (BEL)	Eli Iserbyt (BEL)	Lars van der Haar (NED)	Michael Vanthourenhout (BEL)
25 January	(Belgium) Maasmechelen	22.20 km	Mathieu van der Poel (NED)	Wout van Aert (BEL)	Joris Nieuwenhuis (NED)	Michael Vanthourenhout (BEL)
26 January	(Netherlands) Hoogerheide	21.82 km	Mathieu van der Poel (NED)	Michael Vanthourenhout (BEL)	Lars van der Haar (NED)	Michael Vanthourenhout (BEL)

==== World Cup Standings ====
The final standings were calculated based on the standing in each race.

Pos.	Rider	(Belgium) ANT	(Republic of Ireland) DUB	(Italy) CAB	(Belgium) NAM	(Netherlands) HUL	(Belgium) ZON	(Belgium) GAV	(France) BES	(Belgium) DEN	(Spain) BEN	(Belgium) MAA	(Netherlands) HOO	Total Points
1	(Belgium) Michael Vanthourenhout	3	1		1	7	10	2	7	5	5	6	2	281
2	(Belgium) Toon Aerts	8	2		2	8	4	10	2	4	14	5	4	241
3	(Belgium) Joran Wyseure	4	5		9	23	3	9	5	3	15	4	5	205
4	(Netherlands) Mathieu van der Poel	-	-		-	-	1	1	1	-	-	1	1	200
5	(Belgium) Eli Iserbyt	1	4		DNF	4	8	-	4	11	2	18	6	197
6	(Netherlands) Lars van der Haar	6	7		10	9	5	4	-	19	3	7	3	191
7	(Belgium) Emiel Verstrynge	-	-		3	6	19	5	11	2	9	11	7	169
8	(Spain) Felipe Orts Lloret	9	3		14	2	23	19	10	12	6	15	14	167
9	(Netherlands) Pim Ronhaar	7	6		4	3	11	12	19	6	22	DNF	11	161
10	(Belgium) Thibau Nys	12	DNF		11	16	2	3	-	8	1	-	DNF	152
11	(Belgium) Niels Vandeputte	5	-		-	1	7	6	3	23	7	-	23	150
12	(Switzerland) Kevin Kuhn	10	8		7	24	14	-26-	8	7	13	9	20	140
13	(Belgium) Laurens Sweeck	2	9		6	15	6	-	18	-	21	8	DNF	129
14	(Netherlands) Mees Hendrikx	17	12		21	11	12	20	15	10	20	13	15	120
15	(Belgium) Jens Adams	14	14		-	13	9	17	16	-	12	17	9	113
16	(United Kingdom) Cameron Mason	25	15		-	5	17	8	-	9	23	12	25	95
17	(Belgium) Wout van Aert	-	-		-	-	-	-	-	1	4	2	-	92
18	(Czech Republic) Michael Boros	15	21		DNF	21	16	13	9	15	-27-	19	17	88
19	(Belgium) Toon Vandebosch	18	-		12	18	22	14	17	13	16	-	18	86
20	(Netherlands) Ryan Kamp	13	-		16	17	13	-30-	25	16	24	21	10	79
21	(United Kingdom) Thomas Mein	23	-		13	DNF	-	15	6	-	19	10	19	77
22	(Netherlands) Corné van Kessel	19	24		-32-	12	18	11	14	17	-26-	-36-	-26-	67
23	(Netherlands) Joris Nieuwenhuis	-	-		-	-	-	-	-	-	8	3	8	61
24	(France) Clément Venturini	-	13		-	-29-	25	-	13	-27-	11	20	13	61
25	(Belgium) Victor Van de Putte	20	11		15	DNF	15	DNF	-	-	-	14	-	55
26	(France) Joshua Dubau	-	-		-	-	-	-	12	14	10	-	16	52
27	(France) David Menut	-	16		-	10	20	16	21	-	-	-47-	-	47
28	(Netherlands) Tibor Del Grosso	-	-		5	-	-	7	-	-	-	-	-	40
29	(Belgium) Jente Michels	16	-		8	-	-	18	-	-	-	-	-	36
30	(Belgium) Gerben Kuypers	11	10		DNF	-	-	-	-	-	-	-	-	31
31	(Italy) Gioele Bertolini	-44-	-		18	22	-26-	23	-34-	-34-	18	25	-28-	24
32	(Switzerland) Loris Rouiller	-	-		20	14	-	-	-27-	-	-32-	-	-	18
33	(France) Fabien Doubey	-	-		-	-	-	-	23	-	-	-	12	17
34	(Germany) Marcel Meisen	-28-	-		-26-	-	24	-34-	-	DNF	-	16	21	17
35	(Spain) Kevin Suarez Fernandez	22	19		-	20	-30-	DNF	-29-	-	-35-	-29-	DNF	17
36	(United States) Andrew Strohmeyer	-	17		-	19	-34-	-39-	DNF	-	-31-	-58-	-	16
37	(France) Martin Groslambert	-	-		-	-	-	-	22	-28-	17	24	-29-	15
38	(France) Nathan Bommenel	-33-	-		17	-	-	25	-	-	-	22	-	14
39	(Belgium) Daan Soete	-	18		25	-	-	-	-	-	-	-	-	9
40	(United States) Scott Funston	-	-		-	25	-28-	-32-	20	-	-	-26-	24	9
41	(Switzerland) Lars Sommer	-37-	-		-30-	-27-	-33-	-29-	-31-	18	-	-56-	-	8
42	(Belgium) Aaron Dockx	-	-		19	-	-	-	-	-	-	-	-	7
43	(Canada) Ian Ackert	-	-		23	-	-	22	-	-	-	-	-	7
44	(Italy) Stefano Viezzi	-30-	-		-	-	-	-	-	20	-	-	-	6
45	(France) Ugo Ananie	-	20		-	-30-	-	-35-	-	-	-	-42-	-	6
46	(Belgium) Viktor Vandenberghe	-	-		-	-	-	-	-	21	-	-	-	5
47	(France) Théo Thomas	-	-		-	-	-32-	21	-	-	-	-	-	5
48	(Switzerland) Luke Wiedmann	-	-		-	DNF	21	-	-26-	-	-	-	-	5
49	(Belgium) Yordi Corsus	21	-		-	-	-	-	-	-	-	-	-	5
50	(Belgium) Witse Meeussen	-31-	-		DNF	-	-	-	-	-	25	-	22	5
51	(Netherlands) David Haverdings	24	-		-	-	-	-	-	-	-	23	-	5
52	(Belgium) Anton Ferdinande	-	-		-	-	-	-	-	22	-	-28-	-	4
53	(Netherlands) Danny van Lierop	-27-	-		22	-	-	-	-	-	-	-33-	-	4
54	(France) Timothé Gabriel	-	22		-	-36-	-27-	-	-33-	-41-	-40-	-	-34-	4
55	(Switzerland) Gilles Mottiez	-	23		-29-	-26-	-31-	-51-	-	-	-	-	-30-	3
56	(Belgium) Sil De Brauwere	-	-		-	-	-	-	-	24	-	-46-	-	2
57	(Belgium) Lander Loockx	-	-		-	-	-	-	24	-	-	-	-	2
58	(France) Nicolas Reculeau	-	-		-	-32-	-50-	24	-28-	-	-	-	-	2
59	(France) Valentin Remondet	-	-26-		24	-	-	-	-40-	-	-	-	-	2
60	(Netherlands) Senna Remijn	-	-		-	-	-	-28-	-	25	-	-	-	1
61	(United States) Curtis White	-	25		-	-	-	-	-43-	-26-	-36-	-43-	-32-	1

Key
1st Place	2nd Place	3rd Place	Other points position	-Finished without points-	Did not finish	(Did not start)	Cancelled

=== Elite Women ===
==== Race results ====
Date	Race	Distance	Winner	Second	Third	Competition leader
24 November	(Belgium) Antwerp	19.29 km	Fem van Empel (NED)	Lucinda Brand (NED)	Marie Schreiber (LUX)	Fem van Empel (NED)
1 December	(Republic of Ireland) Dublin	18.68 km	Lucinda Brand (NED)	Fem van Empel (NED)	Zoe Bäckstedt (GBR)	Lucinda Brand (NED)
8 December	(Italy) Cabras-Sardinia	Cancelled due to the bad weather				Lucinda Brand (NED)
15 December	(Belgium) Namur	14.80 km	Ceylin del Carmen Alvarado (NED)	Lucinda Brand (NED)	Puck Pieterse (NED)	Lucinda Brand (NED)
21 December	(Netherlands) Hulst	17.51 km	Marie Schreiber (LUX)	Lucinda Brand (NED)	Puck Pieterse (NED)	Lucinda Brand (NED)
22 December	(Belgium) Zonhoven	18.68 km	Ceylin del Carmen Alvarado (NED)	Zoe Bäckstedt (GBR)	Lucinda Brand (NED)	Lucinda Brand (NED)
26 December	(Belgium) Gavere	14.60 km	Fem van Empel (NED)	Lucinda Brand (NED)	Puck Pieterse (NED)	Lucinda Brand (NED)
29 December	(France) Besançon	15.25 km	Fem van Empel (NED)	Lucinda Brand (NED)	Blanka Kata Vas (HUN)	Lucinda Brand (NED)
5 January	(Belgium) Dendermonde	15.07 km	Lucinda Brand (NED)	Puck Pieterse (NED)	Fem van Empel (NED)	Lucinda Brand (NED)
19 January	(Spain) Benidorm	19.29 km	Fem van Empel (NED)	Lucinda Brand (NED)	Marie Schreiber (LUX)	Lucinda Brand (NED)
25 January	(Belgium) Maasmechelen	15.80 km	Blanka Kata Vas (HUN)	Zoe Bäckstedt (GBR)	Lucinda Brand (NED)	Lucinda Brand (NED)
26 January	(Netherlands) Hoogerheide	15.62 km	Lucinda Brand (NED)	Blanka Kata Vas (HUN)	Puck Pieterse (NED)	Lucinda Brand (NED)

==== World Cup Standings ====
The final standings were calculated based on the standing in each race.

Pos.	Rider	(Belgium) ANT	(Republic of Ireland) DUB	(Italy) CAB	(Belgium) NAM	(Netherlands) HUL	(Belgium) ZON	(Belgium) GAV	(France) BES	(Belgium) DEN	(Spain) BEN	(Belgium) MAA	(Netherlands) HOO	Total Points
1	(Netherlands) Lucinda Brand	2	1		2	2	3	2	2	1	2	3	1	350
2	(Netherlands) Fem van Empel	1	2		7	-	-	1	1	3	1	6	4	276
3	(Hungary) Blanka Kata Vas	6	5		4	9	6	4	3	11	5	1	2	253
4	(United Kingdom) Zoe Backstedt	7	3		9	7	2	5	4	5	6	2	6	244
5	(Netherlands) Inge van der Heijden	8	4		8	5	4	6	7	6	9	8	8	213
6	(Luxembourg) Marie Schreiber	3	7		5	1	7	9	18	12	3	9	DNF	205
7	(Netherlands) Ceylin del Carmen Alvarado	5	-		1	8	1	-	6	DNF	8	5	5	199
8	(Netherlands) Puck Pieterse	-	-		3	3	5	3	-	2	-	4	3	173
9	(Netherlands) Manon Bakker	18	19		12	10	10	8	11	4	18	7	13	156
10	(Netherlands) Leonie Bentveld	15	9		10	6	8	12	12	7	17	22	14	154
11	(Belgium) Marion Norbert-Riberolle	13	8		21	11	11	7	8	8	-50-	11	22	140
12	(Netherlands) Denise Betsema	16	13		17	14	20	10	15	10	13	17	12	129
13	(France) Amandine Fouquenet	12	11		14	DNF	15	-	13	13	11	15	9	121
14	(France) Hélène Clauzel	14	17		15	13	13	-	10	-	12	18	11	111
15	(Netherlands) Aniek van Alphen	11	10		16	16	17	11	20	14	22	21	21	107
16	(Netherlands) Annemarie Worst	10	6		6	4	DNF	-	-	-	-	14	16	100
17	(Italy) Sara Casasola	4	-		11	DNF	-	-	-	-	7	10	7	91
18	(Belgium) Sanne Cant	19	-		-	18	9	-	-	9	-	16	18	67
19	(Belgium) Julie Brouwers	20	23		-27-	25	18	14	19	17	19	23	15	67
20	(Netherlands) Marianne Vos	-	-		-	-	-	-	5	-	4	13	DNF	56
21	(Belgium) Laura Verdonschot	9	14		13	12	DNF	-	-	-	-	-	-	56
22	(France) Célia Gery	23	DNF		23	19	14	-	9	-	14	-	-32-	54
23	(Canada) Isabella Holmgren	-	-		-	20	12	-	-	-	-	12	10	50
24	(Belgium) Alicia Franck	21	16		20	17	16	-	25	-	-28-	20	-27-	47
25	(United Kingdom) Anna Kay	-26-	21		25	22	22	15	-	-	20	-27-	-36-	31
26	(Slovakia) Viktória Chladoňová	-	-		-	-	-	-	-	-	10	24	17	27
27	(United Kingdom) Imogen Wolff	-38-	20		-	-	-	20	21	16	-26-	-36-	-	27
28	(Belgium) Fleur Moors	17	12		-	-	-	-	-	-	-	-	-	23
29	(France) Amandine Muller	-	24		-	24	-26-	-	14	-	-29-	-	20	22
30	(United States) Vida Lopez de san Roman	-	-		-	21	-33-	19	16	-	-	-	-26-	22
31	(Italy) Carlotta Borello	-	-		18	-26-	-30-	-	-29-	-	15	-	-	19
32	(France) Caroline Mani	-	-		-	-	-44-	18	-27-	15	-	-	-28-	19
33	(Netherlands) Jamie de Beer	24	18		-	-33-	-	23	-	20	-	-	-	19
34	(Italy) Rebecca Gariboldi	-	-		-29-	23	24	-	17	-	-	25	23	18
35	(Belgium) Xaydee Van Sinaey	-29-	-27-		-36-	-	-	17	22	22	-	-	-	17
36	(Belgium) Kiona Crabbé	-33-	-		-40-	-65-	-29-	13	-46-	24	-	-34-	-41-	15
37	(Belgium) Jinse Peeters	-32-	-36-		-32-	-35-	-	-31-	-40-	19	-33-	-33-	19	14
38	(United States) Katie Clouse	-	-		-	-29-	23	24	DNF	-	25	19	DNF	13
39	(Spain) Lucia Gonzalez Blanco	22	22		-	-27-	-41-	21	-31-	-	-35-	DNF	-	13
40	(Canada) Ava Holmgren	-	-		-	15	DNF	-	-	-	-	-	-	11
41	(Canada) Maghalie Rochette	-	15		-	-	-	-	-	-	-	-	-	11
42	(Italy) Francesca Baroni	-28-	-		22	-28-	21	-27-	24	-26-	-34-	-30-	-34-	11
43	(United Kingdom) Cat Ferguson	-	-		-28-	DNF	-	-	-	-	16	-28-	-29-	10
44	(United Kingdom) Ella Maclean-Howell	-	-		-	-32-	-	16	-	-	-	-	-	10
45	(Netherlands) Larissa Hartog	-27-	-		24	-	19	-	-	-	-	-	25	10
46	(United Kingdom) Xan Crees	-43-	-39-		DNF	-39-	-56-	-	-33-	18	-	-35-	-51-	8
47	(Canada) Rafaelle Carrier	-	-		19	-	-	-	-	-	-	-	-	7
48	(Canada) Sidney Mcgill	-35-	-26-		-30-	-30-	-37-	-	-	-	21	-29-	24	7
49	(France) Alexandra Valade	-	-		-	-40-	DNF	-	-30-	21	-61-	-	-	5
50	(Romania) Wendy Bunea	-	-		-	-59-	-	22	-	-	-	-	-	4
51	(Spain) Sofia Rodriguez Revert	25	25		-	-77-	-43-	-32-	-38-	-	24	-32-	-40-	4
52	(France) Electa Gallezot	-36-	-		-35-	-36-	-42-	-	-28-	-	23	-	-33-	3
53	(Belgium) Kim Van de Steene	-	-		-48-	-	-	-28-	-	23	-	-	-	3
54	(France) Anais Morichon	-	-		-	DNF	-27-	-	23	-	-	-	-	3
55	(Belgium) Sterre Vervloet	-	-		-	-	-34-	-	-43-	25	-43-	-	-39-	1
56	(Italy) Letizia Borghesi	-	-		-	-46-	-	25	-	-	-	-	-	1
57	(Czech Republic) Kristyna Zemanová	-	-		-	-	25	-	-	-	-	-	-	1

Key
1st Place	2nd Place	3rd Place	Other points position	-Finished without points-	Did not finish	(Did not start)	Cancelled

=== Under-23 Men ===
==== Race results ====
Date	Race	Distance	Winner	Second	Third	Competition leader
1 December	(Republic of Ireland) Dublin	21.78 km	Jente Michels (BEL)	Aaron Dockx (BEL)	David Haverdings (NED)	Jente Michels (BEL)
21 December	(Netherlands) Hulst	20.41 km	Tibor del Grosso (NED)	Jente Michels (BEL)	David Haverdings (NED)	Jente Michels (BEL)
22 December	(Belgium) Zonhoven	18.68 km	Tibor del Grosso (NED)	Jente Michels (BEL)	Kay De Bruyckere (BEL)	Jente Michels (BEL)
29 December	(France) Besançon	18.35 km	Tibor del Grosso (NED)	Yordi Corsus (BEL)	Aubin Sparfel (FRA)	Tibor del Grosso (NED)
19 January	(Spain) Benidorm	22.48 km	Tibor del Grosso (NED)	Jente Michels (BEL)	Aubin Sparfel (FRA)	Tibor del Grosso (NED)
26 January	(Netherlands) Hoogerheide	18.72 km	Tibor del Grosso (NED)	Aubin Sparfel (FRA)	Stefano Viezzi (ITA)	Tibor del Grosso (NED)

==== World Cup Standings ====
To determine the World Cup standings, only the best 4 results of each rider were considered. This is the top 10 of 50 riders.

Pos.	Rider	(Republic of Ireland) DUB	(Netherlands) HUL	(Belgium) ZON	(France) BES	(Spain) BEN	(Netherlands) HOO	Total Points
1	(Netherlands) Tibor Del Grosso	-	1	1^{*}	1^{*}	1^{*}	1^{*}	160
2	(Belgium) Jente Michels	1^{*}	2^{*}	2^{*}	11	2^{*}	6	130
3	(France) Aubin Sparfel	14	13	4^{*}	3^{*}	3^{*}	2^{*}	102
4	(Belgium) Yordi Corsus	4^{*}	5^{*}	7	2^{*}	7	4^{*}	95
5	(Belgium) Aaron Dockx	2^{*}	11	11^{*}	25	11^{*}	5^{*}	81
6	(France) Léo Bisiaux	5^{*}	4^{*}	8^{*}	7^{*}	-	13	80
7	(Italy) Stefano Viezzi	-	15	9^{*}	10^{*}	5^{*}	3^{*}	79
8	(Belgium) Kay De Bruyckere	9^{*}	21	3^{*}	18	8^{*}	7^{*}	79
9	(Netherlands) Senna Remijn	10	6^{*}	5^{*}	8^{*}	6^{*}	-	79
10	(Netherlands) Guus van den Eijnden	8^{*}	7^{*}	15	17	4^{*}	9^{*}	76

Key
1st Place	2nd Place	3rd Place	Other points position	-Finished without points-	Did not finish	(Did not start)	^{*}best 4 results

=== Under-23 Women ===
There was no separate race for Under-23 Women. The riders in this age category competed in the Elite Women race, and received World Cup points based on the standing in the combined Elite/Under-23 race. So for example finishing first among the Under-23 riders but fifth in the combined Elite/Under-23 classification would give not 40 but 20 points.

==== Race results ====
Date	Race	Distance	Winner	Second	Third	Competition leader
24 November	(Belgium) Antwerp	19.29 km	Marie Schreiber (LUX)	Zoe Bäckstedt (GBR)	Leonie Bentveld (NED)	Marie Schreiber (LUX)
1 December	(Republic of Ireland) Dublin	18.68 km	Zoe Bäckstedt (GBR)	Marie Schreiber (LUX)	Leonie Bentveld (NED)	Zoe Bäckstedt (GBR)
8 December	(Italy) Cabras-Sardinia	Cancelled due to the bad weather				Zoe Bäckstedt (GBR)
15 December	(Belgium) Namur	14.80 km	Marie Schreiber (LUX)	Zoe Bäckstedt (GBR)	Leonie Bentveld (NED)	Marie Schreiber (LUX)
21 December	(Netherlands) Hulst	17.51 km	Marie Schreiber (LUX)	Leonie Bentveld (NED)	Zoe Bäckstedt (GBR)	Marie Schreiber (LUX)
22 December	(Belgium) Zonhoven	18.68 km	Zoe Bäckstedt (GBR)	Marie Schreiber (LUX)	Leonie Bentveld (NED)	Marie Schreiber (LUX)
26 December	(Belgium) Gavere	14.60 km	Zoe Bäckstedt (GBR)	Marie Schreiber (LUX)	Leonie Bentveld (NED)	Marie Schreiber (LUX)
29 December	(France) Besançon	15.25 km	Zoe Bäckstedt (GBR)	Célia Gery (FRA)	Leonie Bentveld (NED)	Zoe Bäckstedt (GBR)
5 January	(Belgium) Dendermonde	15.07 km	Zoe Bäckstedt (GBR)	Leonie Bentveld (NED)	Marie Schreiber (LUX)	Zoe Bäckstedt (GBR)
19 January	(Spain) Benidorm	19.29 km	Marie Schreiber (LUX)	Zoe Bäckstedt (GBR)	Viktória Chladoňová (SVK)	Zoe Bäckstedt (GBR)
25 January	(Belgium) Maasmechelen	15.80 km	Zoe Bäckstedt (GBR)	Marie Schreiber (LUX)	Isabella Holmgren (CAN)	Zoe Bäckstedt (GBR)
26 January	(Netherlands) Hoogerheide	15.62 km	Zoe Bäckstedt (GBR)	Isabella Holmgren (CAN)	Leonie Bentveld (NED)	Zoe Bäckstedt (GBR)

==== World Cup Standings ====
Pos.	Rider	(Belgium) ANT	(Republic of Ireland) DUB	(Italy) CAB	(Belgium) NAM	(Netherlands) HUL	(Belgium) ZON	(Belgium) GAV	(France) BES	(Belgium) DEN	(Spain) BEN	(Belgium) MAA	(Netherlands) HOO	Total Points
1	(United Kingdom) Zoe Backstedt	7	3		9	7	2	5	4	5	6	2	6	244
2	(Luxembourg) Marie Schreiber	3	7		5	1	7	9	18	12	3	9	DNF	205
3	(Netherlands) Leonie Bentveld	15	9		10	6	8	12	12	7	17	22	14	154
4	(France) Célia Gery	23	DNF		23	19	14	-	9	-	14	-	-32-	54
5	(Canada) Isabella Holmgren	-	-		-	20	12	-	-	-	-	12	10	50
6	(Slovakia) Viktória Chladoňová	-	-		-	-	-	-	-	-	10	24	17	27
7	(United Kingdom) Imogen Wolff	-38-	20		-	-	-	20	21	16	-26-	-36-	-	27
8	(Belgium) Fleur Moors	17	12		-	-	-	-	-	-	-	-	-	23
9	(France) Amandine Muller	-	24		-	24	-26-	-	14	-	-29-	-	20	22
10	(United States) Vida Lopez de san Roman	-	-		-	21	-33-	19	16	-	-	-	-26-	22
11	(Belgium) Xaydee Van Sinaey	-29-	-27-		-36-	-	-	17	22	22	-	-	-	17
12	(Canada) Ava Holmgren	-	-		-	15	DNF	-	-	-	-	-	-	11
13	(United Kingdom) Cat Ferguson	-	-		-28-	DNF	-	-	-	-	16	-28-	-29-	10
14	(United Kingdom) Ella Maclean-Howell	-	-		-	-32-	-	16	-	-	-	-	-	10
15	(Canada) Rafaelle Carrier	-	-		19	-	-	-	-	-	-	-	-	7
16	(France) Alexandra Valade	-	-		-	-40-	DNF	-	-30-	21	-61-	-	-	5
17	(Romania) Wendy Bunea	-	-		-	-59-	-	22	-	-	-	-	-	4
18	(France) Electa Gallezot	-36-	-		-35-	-36-	-42-	-	-28-	-	23	-	-33-	3
19	(Belgium) Sterre Vervloet	-	-		-	-	-34-	-	-43-	25	-43-	-	-39-	1
20	(Czech Republic) Kristyna Zemanová	-	-		-	-	25	-	-	-	-	-	-	1

Key
1st Place	2nd Place	3rd Place	Other points position	-Finished without points-	Did not finish	(Did not start)	Cancelled

=== Junior Men ===
==== Race results ====
Date	Race	Distance	Winner	Second	Third	Competition leader
1 December	(Republic of Ireland) Dublin	15.85 km	Soren Bruyère Joumard (FRA)	Giel Lejeune (BEL)	Lennes Jacobs (BEL)	Soren Bruyère Joumard (FRA)
21 December	(Netherlands) Hulst	14.61 km	Giel Lejeune (BEL)	Mattia Agostinacchio (ITA)	Arthur Van Den Boer (BEL)	Giel Lejeune (BEL)
22 December	(Belgium) Zonhoven	15.57 km	Mattia Agostinacchio (ITA)	Benjamin Noval Suarez (ESP)	Michiel Mouris (NED)	Giel Lejeune (BEL)
29 December	(France) Besançon	15.25 km	Soren Bruyère Joumard (FRA)	Arthur Van Den Boer (BEL)	Oscar Amey (GBR)	Soren Bruyère Joumard (FRA)
19 January	(Spain) Benidorm	16.09 km	Mattia Agostinacchio (ITA)	Soren Bruyère Joumard (FRA)	Valentin Hofer (AUT)	Soren Bruyère Joumard (FRA)
26 January	(Netherlands) Hoogerheide	16.09 km	Benedikt Benz (GER)	Mats Vanden Eynde (BEL)	Patrik Pezzo Rosola (ITA)	Soren Bruyère Joumard (FRA)

==== World Cup Standings ====
To determine the World Cup standings, only the best 4 results of each rider were considered. This is the top 5 of 52 riders.

Pos.	Rider	(Republic of Ireland) DUB	(Netherlands) HUL	(Belgium) ZON	(France) BES	(Spain) BEN	(Netherlands) HOO	Total Points
1	(France) Soren Bruyère Joumard	1^{*}	10	10	1^{*}	2^{*}	4^{*}	132
2	(Italy) Mattia Agostinacchio	10^{*}	2^{*}	1^{*}	13	1^{*}	19	126
3	(Belgium) Giel Lejeune	2^{*}	1^{*}	5^{*}	18	7^{*}	13	110
4	(Belgium) Mats Vanden Eynde	5^{*}	19	4^{*}	19	9^{*}	2^{*}	90
5	(Spain) Benjamin Noval Suarez	4^{*}	16	2^{*}	15^{*}	4^{*}	-	85

Key
1st Place	2nd Place	3rd Place	Other points position	-Finished without points-	Did not finish	(Did not start)	^{*}best 4 results

=== Junior Women ===
==== Race results ====
Date	Race	Distance	Winner	Second	Third	Competition leader
1 December	(Republic of Ireland) Dublin	12.48 km	Lidia Cusack (USA)	Lison Desprez (FRA)	Rafaelle Carrier (CAN)	Lidia Cusack (USA)
21 December	(Netherlands) Hulst	11.71 km	Rafaelle Carrier (CAN)	Barbora Bukovská (CZE)	Lison Desprez (FRA)	Rafaelle Carrier (CAN)
22 December	(Belgium) Zonhoven	12.48 km	Rafaelle Carrier (CAN)	Lison Desprez (FRA)	Barbora Bukovská (CZE)	Rafaelle Carrier (CAN)
29 December	(France) Besançon	12.15 km	Lise Revol (FRA)	Jeanne Duterne (FRA)	Lison Desprez (FRA)	Rafaelle Carrier (CAN)
19 January	(Spain) Benidorm	16.09 km	Lise Revol (FRA)	Rafaelle Carrier (CAN)	Mae Cabaca (NED)	Rafaelle Carrier (CAN)
26 January	(Netherlands) Hoogerheide	12.52 km	Barbora Bukovská (CZE)	Mae Cabaca (NED)	Rafaelle Carrier (CAN)	Rafaelle Carrier (CAN)

==== World Cup Standings ====
To determine the World Cup standings, only the best 4 results of each rider were considered. This is the top 5 of 45 riders.

Pos.	Rider	(Republic of Ireland) DUB	(Netherlands) HUL	(Belgium) ZON	(France) BES	(Spain) BEN	(Netherlands) HOO	Total Points
1	(Canada) Rafaelle Carrier	3	1^{*}	1^{*}	6	2^{*}	3^{*}	135
2	(France) Lise Revol	7	10	4^{*}	1^{*}	1^{*}	5^{*}	123
3	(Czech Republic) Barbora Bukovská	8	2^{*}	3^{*}	4^{*}	-	1^{*}	117
4	(France) Lison Desprez	2^{*}	3^{*}	2^{*}	3^{*}	DNF	-	110
5	(United States) Lidia Cusack	1^{*}	14	6^{*}	9	4^{*}	6^{*}	102

Key
1st Place	2nd Place	3rd Place	Other points position	-Finished without points-	Did not finish	(Did not start)	^{*}best 4 results

== See also ==
- 2024–25 Cyclo-cross Superprestige
- 2024–25 X²O Badkamers Trophy
- 2024–25 UCI Cyclo-cross season
- 2025 UCI Cyclo-cross World Championships
