= 2025 GP Miguel Induráin =

2025 UCI ProSeries

Race details
- Dates: 5 April 2025
- Stages: 1
- Distance: 203.9 km (126.7 mi)
- Winning time: 4h 59' 54"

Results
	Winner	Thibau Nys (BEL)	(Lidl–Trek)
	Second	Alex Molenaar (NED)	(Caja Rural–Seguros RGA)
	Third	Andrea Bagioli (ITA)	(Lidl–Trek)

The 2025 GP Miguel Induráin was the 71st edition of the GP Miguel Induráin road cycling one day race, which was held on 5 April 2025, starting and finishing in Estella.

== Teams ==
Ten of the eighteen UCI WorldTeams, seven UCI ProTeams, and three UCI Continental teams made up the twenty teams that participated in the race.

UCI WorldTeams

- Arkéa–B&B Hotels
- Cofidis
- EF Education–EasyPost
- Lidl–Trek
- Movistar Team
- Red Bull–Bora–Hansgrohe
- Team Jayco–AlUla
- Team Picnic–PostNL
- UAE Team Emirates XRG
- XDS Astana Team

UCI ProTeams

- Burgos Burpellet BH
- Caja Rural–Seguros RGA
- Equipo Kern Pharma
- Euskaltel–Euskadi
- Team Polti VisitMalta
- Team TotalEnergies
- Tudor Pro Cycling Team

UCI Continental Teams

- Anicolor / Tien 21
- FEIRENSE–BEECELER
- Illes Balears Arabay

== Result ==
Result
Rank	Rider	Team	Time
1	Thibau Nys (BEL)	Lidl–Trek	4h 59' 54"
2	Alex Molenaar (NED)	Caja Rural–Seguros RGA	+ 3"
3	Andrea Bagioli (ITA)	Lidl–Trek	+ 3"
4	Guillermo Thomas Silva (URU)	Caja Rural–Seguros RGA	+ 7"
5	Alex Aranburu (ESP)	Cofidis	+ 7"
6	Marc Hirschi (SUI)	Tudor Pro Cycling Team	+ 7"
7	Felix Großschartner (AUT)	UAE Team Emirates XRG	+ 9"
8	Simone Velasco (ITA)	XDS Astana Team	+ 9"
9	Alex Baudin (FRA)	EF Education–EasyPost	+ 9"
10	Pau Miquel (ESP)	Equipo Kern Pharma	+ 9"
