= Cyclo-cross Benidorm =

Cyclo-cross race in Benidorm, Spain

Ciclocrós Benidorm

Race details
- Region: Benidorm, Spain
- English name: Cyclo-cross Benidorm
- Local name: Ciclocrós Benidorm
- Discipline: Cyclo-cross
- Competition: UCI World Cup
- Type: one-day

History (men)
- First edition: 2023
- Editions: 4 (as of 2026)
- First winner: Mathieu van der Poel (NED)
- Most wins: Mathieu van der Poel (NED) (2 wins)
- Most recent: Mathieu van der Poel (NED)

History (women)
- First edition: 2023
- Editions: 4 (as of 2026)
- First winner: Fem van Empel (NED)
- Most wins: Fem van Empel (NED); (3 wins)
- Most recent: Lucinda Brand (NED)

The Cyclo-cross Benidorm is a professional cyclo-cross race held annually in Benidorm, Spain. Since 2023 the event has been part of the UCI Cyclo-cross World Cup, making it the first World Cup cyclo-cross race hosted in Spain in over a decade.

Cyclo-cross Benidorm debuted on the UCI Cyclo-cross World Cup calendar during the 2022–23 season, with the first race held in January 2023. The race replaced the historic Ziklokross Igorre as Spain’s World Cup cyclo-cross event.

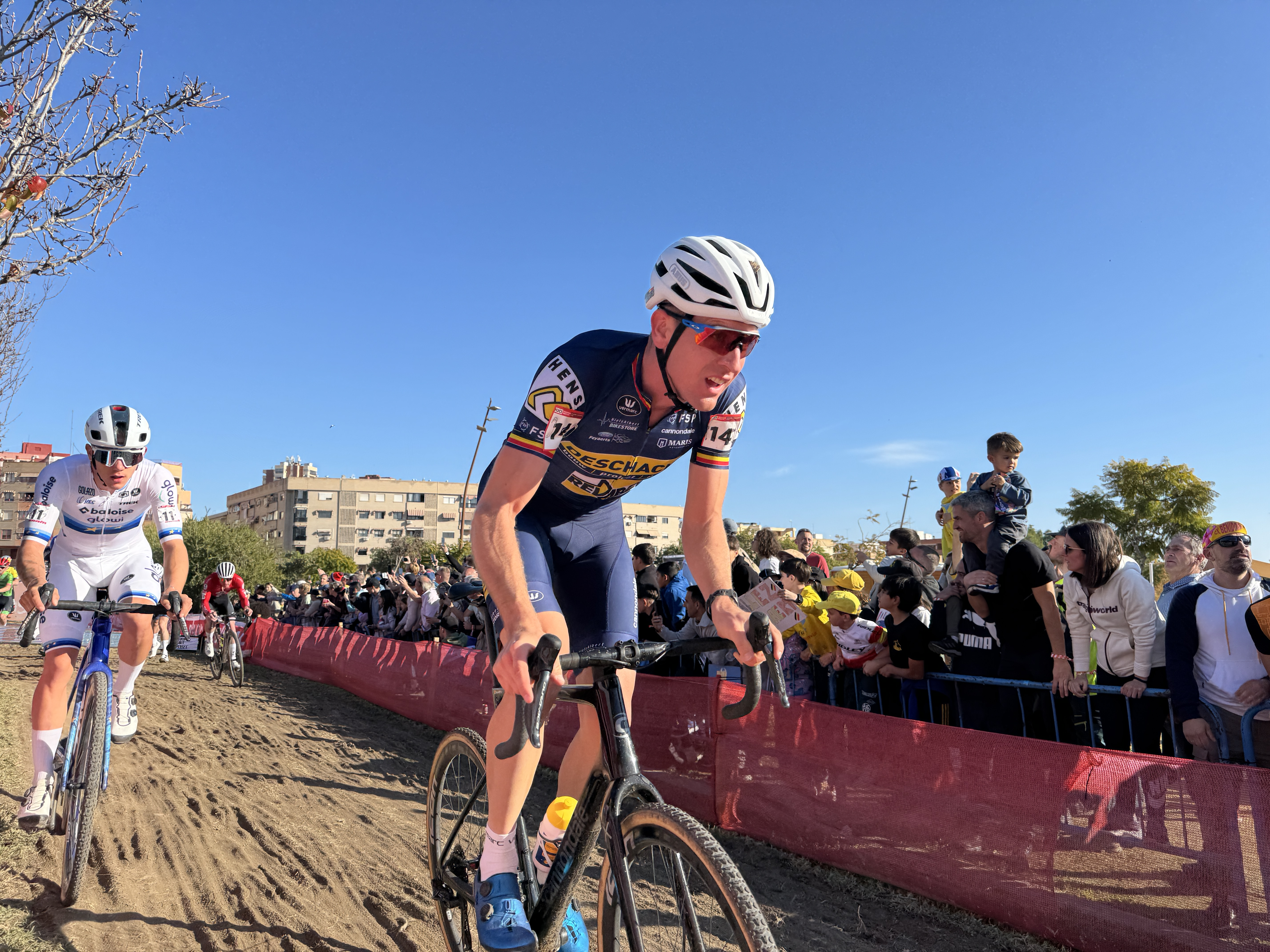
Toon Aerts followed by Thibau Nys during the 2025 Cyclocross Benidorm

== Winners ==
=== Male ===
Year	Winner	Second	Third
2026	Mathieu van der Poel (NED)	Thibau Nys (BEL)	Felipe Orts (ESP)
2025	Thibau Nys (BEL)	Eli Iserbyt (BEL)	Lars van der Haar (NED)
2024	Wout van Aert (BEL)	Michael Vanthourenhout (BEL)	Thibau Nys (BEL)
2023	Mathieu van der Poel (NED)	Wout van Aert (BEL)	Eli Iserbyt (BEL)

=== Female ===
Year	Winner	Second	Third
2026	Lucinda Brand (NED)	Ceylin del Carmen Alvarado (NED)	Amandine Fouquenet (FRA)
2025	Fem van Empel (NED)	Lucinda Brand (NED)	Marie Schreiber (LUX)
2024	Fem van Empel (NED)	Puck Pieterse (NED)	Ceylin del Carmen Alvarado (NED)
2023	Fem van Empel (NED)	Puck Pieterse (NED)	Shirin van Anrooij (NED)
