= Cyclo-cross Maasmechelen =

Cyclocross Maasmechelen

Race details
- Date: January
- Region: Maasmechelen, Belgium
- English name: Cyclo-cross Maasmechelen
- Discipline: Cyclo-cross
- Competition: UCI Cyclo-cross World Cup
- Type: one-day

History (men)
- First edition: 2022
- Editions: 3 (as of 2025)
- First winner: Laurens Sweeck (BEL)
- Most wins: Laurens Sweeck (BEL); Lars van der Haar (NED); Mathieu van der Poel (NED); (1 win)
- Most recent: Mathieu van der Poel (NED)

History (women)
- First edition: 2022
- Editions: 3 (as of 2025)
- First winner: Fem van Empel (NED)
- Most wins: Fem van Empel (NED); (2 wins)
- Most recent: Blanka Kata Vas (HUN)

The Cyclo-cross Maasmechelen race, sometimes called Cyclocross Maasmechelen or Wereldbeker Maasmechelen is a cyclo-cross race held in Maasmechelen, in the Province of Limburg in Belgium. The race has been held since 2022 and has been part of the UCI Cyclo-cross World Cup since then. The race is held in Hoge Kempen National Park on the location of the former coal mines of Eisden. The course has some steep down ramps and a longer off-camber section.

Part of the course runs alongside large mirrors belonging to the Ecotron Lab of Hasselt University.

== History ==
The Cyclocross Maasmechelen was first held in 2022 replacing Cyclo-cross Rupchen in the world cup program. The first edition attracted some criticism due to presence of pebbles and stone on the course, which was the result of the venue being a former mining site.

== Past winners ==
=== Elite Men ===
Season	Series	Winner	Second	Third
2024–2025	World Cup	Mathieu van der Poel (NED)	Wout van Aert (BEL)	Joris Nieuwenhuis (NED)
2023–2024	World Cup	Lars van der Haar (NED)	Eli Iserbyt (BEL)	Laurens Sweeck (BEL)
2022–2023	World Cup	Laurens Sweeck (BEL)	Lars van der Haar (NED)	Eli Iserbyt (BEL)

=== Elite Women ===
Season	Series	Winner	Second	Third
2024–2025	World Cup	Blanka Kata Vas (HUN)	Zoe Bäckstedt (GBR)	Lucinda Brand (NED)
2023–2024	World Cup	Fem van Empel (NED)	Ceylin del Carmen Alvarado (NED)	Aniek van Alphen (NED)
2022–2023	World Cup	Fem van Empel (NED)	Puck Pieterse (NED)	Shirin van Anrooij (NED)
