= 2023–24 UCI Cyclo-cross World Cup =

Bicycle racing competition

Details
- Location: Belgium; France; Ireland; Italy; Netherlands; Spain; United States
- Races: 14

Champions
- Male individual champion: Eli Iserbyt (BEL)
- Female individual champion: Ceylin del Carmen Alvarado (NED)

Location of the blue elite races and red all category crosses. (Enlarge and zoom map to spot all locations.)

The 2023–24 Telenet UCI Cyclo-cross World Cup was a season-long cyclo-cross competition, organized by the Union Cycliste Internationale (UCI), taking place between 15 October 2023 and 28 January 2024.

The defending champions were Laurens Sweeck in the men's competition and Fem van Empel in the women's competition.

== Points distribution ==
Points were awarded to all eligible riders at each race. From this season, the points awarded are according to the same scale for all categories, but only the top 25 riders receive points rather than the top 50. The top ten finishers received points according to the following table:

Points awarded
Position	1	2	3	4	5	6	7	8	9	10
Elite riders	40	30	25	22	21	20	19	18	17	16

- Riders finishing in positions 11 to 25 also received points, going down from 15 points for 11th place by one point per place to 1 point for 25th place.
- Note that the points given here are entirely different from the UCI ranking points, which are distributed according to a different scale and determine starting order in races, but have no impact on World Cup standings.

== Events ==
Date	Race	Location	Winners				
Date	Race	Location	Elite men	Elite women	Under-23 men	Junior men	Junior women
15 October 2023	World Cup Waterloo	Waterloo, United States	Thibau Nys (BEL)	Fem van Empel (NED)	No under-23 or junior races		
29 October 2023	Cyclo-cross Maasmechelen	Maasmechelen, Belgium	Lars van der Haar (NED)	Fem van Empel (NED)	No under-23 or junior races		
12 November 2023	Ambiancecross Dendermonde	Dendermonde, Belgium	Pim Ronhaar (NED)	Ceylin del Carmen Alvarado (NED)	No under-23 or junior races		
19 November 2023	Cyclo-cross Troyes	Troyes, France	Eli Iserbyt (BEL)	Ceylin del Carmen Alvarado (NED)	Tibor Del Grosso (NED)	Stefano Viezzi (ITA)	Cat Ferguson (GBR)
26 November 2023	Cyclo-cross Dublin	(Republic of Ireland) Dublin, Ireland	Pim Ronhaar (NED)	Lucinda Brand (NED)	Tibor Del Grosso (NED)	Stefano Viezzi (ITA)	Célia Gery (FRA)
3 December 2023	Cyclo-cross Flamanville	Flamanville, France	Eli Iserbyt (BEL)	Lucinda Brand (NED)	No under-23 or junior races		
10 December 2023	Cyclo-cross Val di Sole	Val di Sole, Italy	Joris Nieuwenhuis (NED)	Manon Bakker (NED)	No under-23 or junior races		
17 December 2023	Citadelcross	Namur, Belgium	Tom Pidcock (GBR)	Ceylin del Carmen Alvarado (NED)	Emiel Verstrynge (BEL)	Aubin Sparfel (FRA)	Célia Gery (FRA)
23 December 2023	Scheldecross Antwerpen	Antwerp, Belgium	Mathieu van der Poel (NED)	Fem van Empel (NED)	Tibor Del Grosso (NED)	Aubin Sparfel (FRA)	Cat Ferguson (GBR)
26 December 2023	Cyclo-cross Gavere	Gavere, Belgium	Mathieu van der Poel (NED)	Puck Pieterse (NED)	No under-23 or junior races		
30 December 2023	Vestingcross	Hulst, Netherlands	Mathieu van der Poel (NED)	Puck Pieterse (NED)	No under-23 or junior races		
7 January 2024	Cyclo-cross Zonhoven	Zonhoven, Belgium	Mathieu van der Poel (NED)	Puck Pieterse (NED)	No under-23 or junior races		
21 January 2024	Cyclo-cross Benidorm	Benidorm, Spain	Wout van Aert (BEL)	Fem van Empel (NED)	Emiel Verstrynge (BEL)	Aubin Sparfel (FRA)	Célia Gery (FRA)
28 January 2024	Grand Prix Adrie van der Poel	Hoogerheide, Netherlands	Mathieu van der Poel (NED)	Fem van Empel (NED)	Tibor Del Grosso (NED)	Stefano Viezzi (ITA)	Viktória Chladoňová (SVK)

== Points standings ==
Key
Colour	Result
Gold	Winner
Silver	2nd place
Bronze	3rd place
Green	Other points position
Blue	Other classified position
Blue	Not classified, finished (NC)
Purple	Not classified, retired (Ret)
Red	Took part in U23 race (U23)
Red	Took part in Junior race (J)
White	Did not start (DNS)

=== Elite men ===
Pos.	Rider	WAT (United States)	MAA (Belgium)	DEN (Belgium)	TRO (France)	DUB (Republic of Ireland)	FLA (France)	VdS (Italy)	NAM (Belgium)	ANT (Belgium)	GAV (Belgium)	HUL (Netherlands)	ZON (Belgium)	BEN (Spain)	HOO (Netherlands)	Total Points

=== Elite women ===
Pos.	Rider	WAT (United States)	MAA (Belgium)	DEN (Belgium)	TRO (France)	DUB (Republic of Ireland)	FLA (France)	VdS (Italy)	NAM (Belgium)	ANT (Belgium)	GAV (Belgium)	HUL (Netherlands)	ZON (Belgium)	BEN (Spain)	HOO (Netherlands)	Total Points
