= Cyclo-cross Zonhoven =

Cyclo-cross race in Zonhoven, Belgium

Race details
- Region: Zonhoven, Belgium
- Nickname(s): De Kuil van Zonhoven; Eng."The Pit of Zonhoven"
- Discipline: Cyclo-cross
- Competition: UCI Cyclo-cross World Cup

History
- First edition: 1958
- Editions: 29 (as of 2026)
- First winner: Firmin Van Kerrebroeck (BEL)
- Most wins: Mathieu van der Poel (NED) (6 wins)
- Most recent: Mathieu van der Poel (NED)

The Cyclo-cross Zonhoven is a cyclo-cross race in Zonhoven, Belgium. Established in 1958, it was held in December till 1966 after which the race ceased to exist. In 2005 the event was restarted, this time in October. In the 2009–2010 season it became part of the Superprestige and was then held in February. The next season, still as a part of the Superprestige, it was held in October again. Since then it has been held either at the end of October or the beginning of November. In 2018 it's held mid-December. Since the 2021–22 season, the race is part of the UCI Cyclo-cross World Cup.

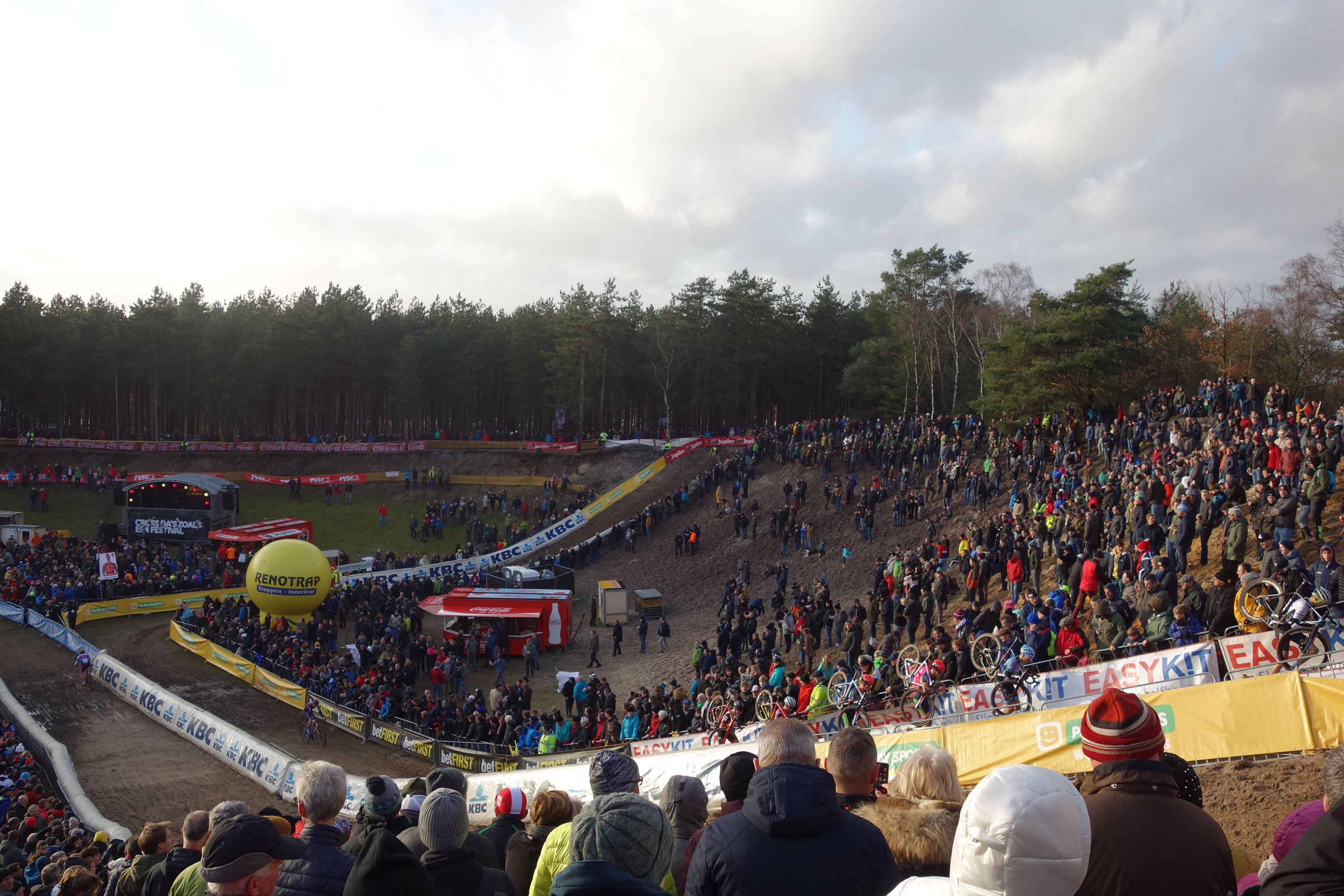
Superprestige Zonhoven

== Winners ==
=== Men ===
Year	Winner	Second	Third
2026	Mathieu van der Poel (NED)	Tibor Del Grosso (NED)	Emiel Verstrynge (BEL)
Dec. 2024	Mathieu van der Poel (NED)	Thibau Nys (BEL)	Joran Wyseure (BEL)
Jan. 2024	Mathieu van der Poel (NED)	Joris Nieuwenhuis (NED)	Laurens Sweeck (BEL)
2023	Wout van Aert (BEL)	Mathieu van der Poel (NED)	Laurens Sweeck (BEL)
2021	Toon Aerts (BEL)	Lars van der Haar (NED)	Eli Iserbyt (BEL)
2020	Cancelled due to COVID-19 pandemic		
2019	Toon Aerts (BEL)	Laurens Sweeck (BEL)	Eli Iserbyt (BEL)
2018	Mathieu van der Poel (NED)	Wout Van Aert (BEL)	Toon Aerts (BEL)
2017	Mathieu van der Poel (NED)	Wout Van Aert (BEL)	Lars Van der Haar (NED)
2016	Mathieu van der Poel (NED)	Wout Van Aert (BEL)	Laurens Sweeck (BEL)
2015	Wout Van Aert (BEL)	Rob Peeters (BEL)	Kevin Pauwels (BEL)
2014	Kevin Pauwels (BEL)	Sven Nys (BEL)	Lars van der Haar (NED)
2013	Sven Nys (BEL)	Niels Albert (BEL)	Klaas Vantornout (BEL)
2012	Sven Nys (BEL)	Niels Albert (BEL)	Bart Aernouts (BEL)
2011	Niels Albert (BEL)	Sven Nys (BEL)	Kevin Pauwels (BEL)
Oct. 2010	Zdeněk Štybar (CZE)	Kevin Pauwels (BEL)	Sven Nys (BEL)
Feb. 2010	Sven Nys (BEL)	Zdeněk Štybar (CZE)	Kevin Pauwels (BEL)
2008	Niels Albert (BEL)	Klaas Vantornout (BEL)	Zdeněk Štybar (CZE)
2007	Bart Wellens (BEL)	Klaas Vantornout (BEL)	Sven Nys (BEL)
2006	Sven Nys (BEL)	Erwin Vervecken (BEL)	Sven Vanthourenhout (BEL)
2005	Sven Nys (BEL)	Bart Wellens (BEL)	Niels Albert (BEL)
1967-2004	Not held		
1966	René De Clercq (BEL)	Julien Vanden Haesevelde (BEL)	Joseph Op de Beeck (BEL)
1965	Leon Scheirs (BEL)	Freddy Nijs (BEL)	René De Rey (BEL)
1964	René De Rey (BEL)	Huub Harings (NED)	Herman Van Caester (BEL)
1963	René De Rey (BEL)	Erik De Vlaeminck (BEL)	Jozef Matheussen (BEL)
1962	Roger De Clercq (BEL)	Lode Van Den Bosch (BEL)	Firmin Van Kerrebroeck (BEL)
1961	René De Rey (BEL)	Leon Scheirs (BEL)	Jos Van Hout (BEL)
1960	Firmin Van Kerrebroeck (BEL)	René De Rey (BEL)	Herman Van Caester (BEL)
1959	Roger De Clercq (BEL)	Firmin Van Kerrebroeck (BEL)	René De Rey (BEL)
1958	Firmin Van Kerrebroeck (BEL)	René De Rey (BEL)	Georges Furnière (BEL)

=== Women ===
Year	Winner	Second	Third
2026	Ceylin del Carmen Alvarado (NED)	Lucinda Brand (NED)	Puck Pieterse (NED)
Dec. 2024	Ceylin del Carmen Alvarado (NED)	Zoe Bäckstedt (GBR)	Lucinda Brand (NED)
Jan. 2024	Puck Pieterse (NED)	Inge van der Heijden (NED)	Zoe Bäckstedt (GBR)
2023	Shirin van Anrooij (NED)	Puck Pieterse (NED)	Fem van Empel (NED)
2021	Denise Betsema (NED)	Lucinda Brand (NED)	Ceylin del Carmen Alvarado (NED)
2020	Cancelled due to COVID-19 pandemic		
2019	Annemarie Worst (NED)	Ceylin del Carmen Alvarado (NED)	Yara Kastelijn (NED)
2018	Sanne Cant (BEL)	Denise Betsema (NED)	Ceylin del Carmen Alvarado (NED)
2017	Maud Kaptheijns (NED)	Sanne Cant (BEL)	Nikki Brammeier (GBR)
2016	Sanne Cant (BEL)	Jolien Verschueren (BEL)	Nikki Harris (GBR)
2015	Sanne Cant (BEL)	Nikki Harris (GBR)	Jolien Verschueren (BEL)
2014	Sanne Cant (BEL)	Nikki Harris (GBR)	Ellen Van Loy (BEL)
2013	Cancelled due to UEC European Cyclo-cross Championships		
2012	Sanne Cant (BEL)	Hanka Kupfernagel (GER)	Sabrina Stultiens (NED)
2011	Sanne Van Paassen (NED)	Nikki Harris (GBR)	Sabrina Stultiens (NED)
2010	Daphny van den Brand (NED)	Helen Wyman (GBR)	Sanne van Paassen (NED)
2008	Nicolle De Bie-Leijten (BEL)	Ilse Vandekinderen (BEL)	Marion Meerkerk (NED)
2007	Helen Wyman (GBR)	Katrien Pauwels (BEL)	Gabriella Durrin (GBR)
2006	Veerle Ingels (BEL)	Birgit Hollmann (GER)	Kathy Ingels (BEL)
