= Rafaelle Carrier =

Canadian cyclist (born 2007)

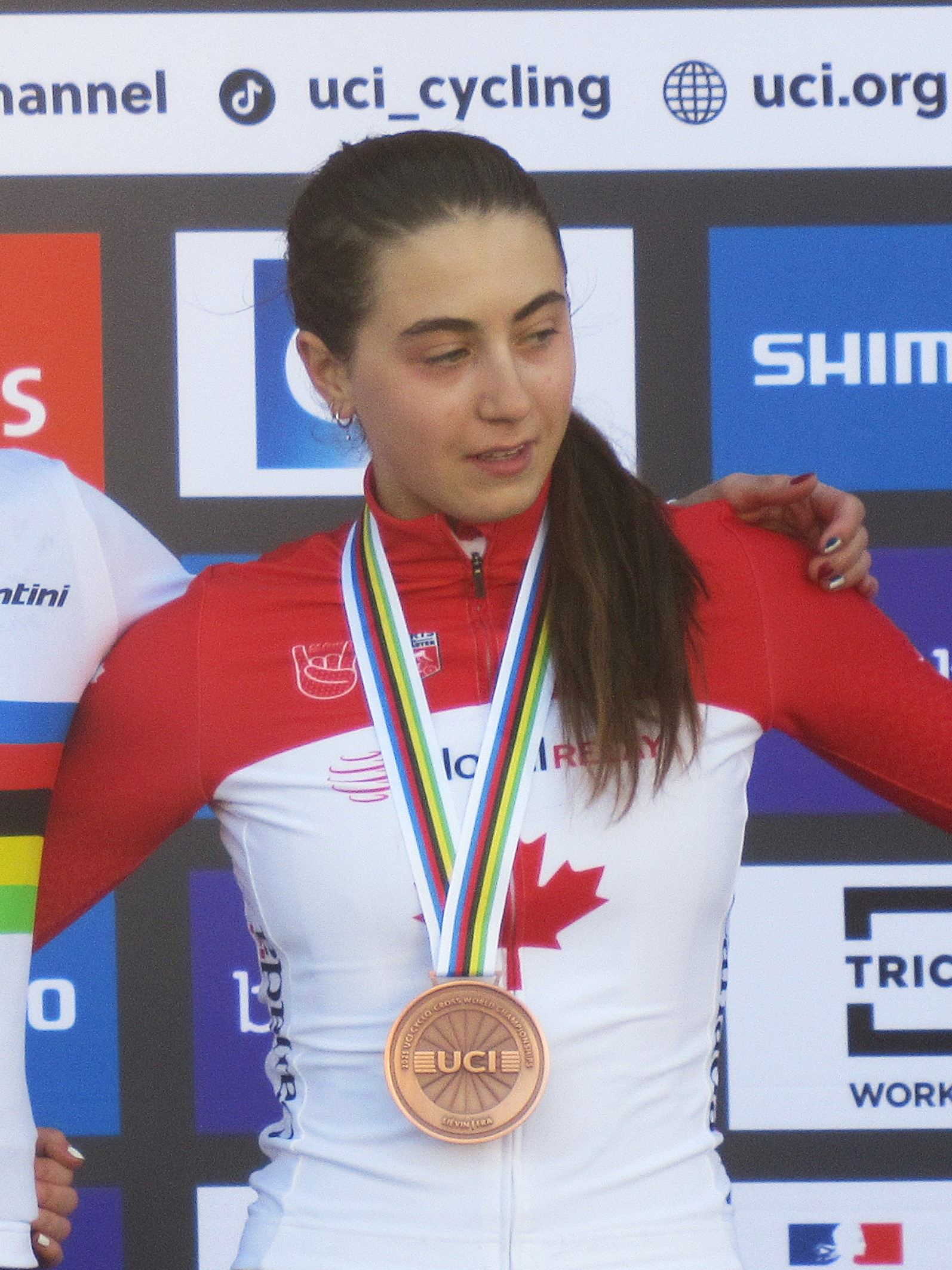
- Carrier on the podium at the 2025 UCI Cyclo-cross World Championships

Personal information
- Born: 5 June 2007 (age 19) Lac-Beauport, Quebec

Cycling career
- Sport: Cycling
- Disciplines: Cyclo-cross; Mountain bike Road

Professional team
- 2025: Arkéa–B&B Hotels Women (Stagiaire)
Medal record
Representing Canada
Women's cyclo-cross
UCI Cyclo-cross World Championships
Bronze medal – third place	2025 Liévin	Junior race
Pan American Cyclo-cross Championships
Gold medal – first place	2023 Missoula	Junior race
Silver medal – second place	2024 Missoula	Junior race
Women's mountain biking
World Championships
Silver medal – second place	2024 Vallnord	Junior cross-country

Rafaelle Carrier (born 5 June 2007) is a Canadian cyclist who competes in cyclo-cross, mountain biking, and road racing. She is considered one of Canada's top cycling prospects. In 2025, Carrier was first in the UCI's rankings for junior women in both mountain biking and cyclo-cross.

Carrier started cycling at age 5, also competing in alpine skiing and football before focusing fully on cycling. She received media attention at age 13 when she swept every Quebec provincial competition she entered in 2020.

== Major results ==
=== Cyclo-cross ===
2023
1st Pan-American Junior Championships
1st Canadian Junior Championships
2024
1st Canadian Junior Championships
2nd Pan-American Junior Championships
2025
1st Canadian U-23 Championships
3rd World Junior Championships

=== Mountain bike ===
2024
2nd Cross-country, World Junior Championships
2025
1st Cross-country, 2025 Pan-American Mountain Bike Junior Championships

=== Road ===
2024
National Junior Championships

10th Road race
10th Time trial

2025
National Junior Championships

1st Road race
4th Time trial
