= Ceylin del Carmen Alvarado =

Dutch cyclist (born 1998)

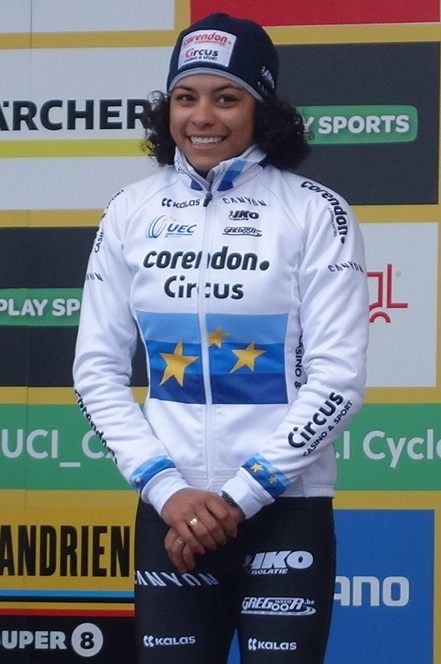
- Alvarado in 2019

Personal information
- Full name: Ceylin del Carmen Alvarado
- Born: 6 August 1998 (age 28) Cabrera, Dominican Republic

Cycling career
- Sport: Cycling
- Current team: Alpecin–Premier Tech (cyclo-cross); Fenix–Premier Tech (road)
- Disciplines: Cyclo-cross; Road; Mountain biking
- Role: Rider

Professional teams
- 2019–: Corendon–Circus
- 2020–: Ciclismo Mundial (road)

Major wins
- Cyclo-cross World Championships (2020) European Championships (2020) National Championships (2020, 2026) World Cup (2023–24) 8 individual wins (2019–20, 2020–21, 2023–24, 2024–25, 2025–26) Superprestige (2019–20, 2022–23, 2023–24) Trophy (2019–20)
Medal record
Representing Netherlands
Women's cyclo-cross
World Championships
Gold medal – first place	2020 Dübendorf	Elite
Silver medal – second place	2026 Hulst	Elite
Silver medal – second place	2018 Valkenburg	Under-23
Bronze medal – third place	2019 Bogense	Under-23
European Championships
Gold medal – first place	2020 ’s-Hertogenbosch	Elite
Gold medal – first place	2018 Rosmalen	Under-23
Gold medal – first place	2019 Silvelle	Under-23
Silver medal – second place	2024 Pontevedra	Elite
Silver medal – second place	2023 Ponchâteau	Elite
Silver medal – second place	2022 Namur	Elite
Bronze medal – third place	2026 Zeddam	Elite
Women's Mountain Bike
World Championships
Bronze medal – third place	2020 Leogang	Under-23 Cross-country

Ceylin del Carmen Alvarado (born 6 August 1998) is a Dominican-born Dutch cyclist, who currently competes in cyclo-cross for UCI Cyclo-cross Team Alpecin–Premier Tech, and in road cycling for UCI Women's Continental Team Fenix–Premier Tech. In 2018, she won the gold medal in the Under-23 race at the UEC European Cyclo-cross Championships in Rosmalen. She repeated this feat in 2019. On 1 February 2020 she became world champion in the elite category at the 2020 UCI Cyclo-cross World Championships in Dübendorf, Switzerland.

== Personal life ==
As of November 2020, Alvarado is in a relationship with fellow pro cyclist Roy Jans. In August 2025 the couple got married in Riemst (Belgium).

== Major results ==
=== Cyclo-cross ===
2015–2016
2nd National Under-23 Championships
2016–2017
Qiansen Trophy

1st Fengtai
1st Yanqing

2017–2018
2nd UCI World Under-23 Championships
Soudal Classics

3rd Hasselt
3rd Leuven

Brico Cross

3rd Hulst

3rd Woerden
2018–2019
1st UEC European Under-23 Championships
1st National Under-23 Championships
1st Overall Under-23 UCI World Cup
1st Overall Under-23 Superprestige
DVV Trophy

1st Brussels

Superprestige

2nd Middelkerke
3rd Zonhoven

2nd Neerpelt
3rd UCI World Under-23 Championships
Brico Cross

3rd Geraardsbergen

3rd Otegem
2019–2020
1st UCI World Championships
1st UEC European Under-23 Championships
1st National Championships
1st Overall DVV Trophy

1st Ronse
1st Loenhout
1st Baal
1st Brussels
1st Lille
2nd Kortrijk

1st Overall Superprestige

1st Gieten
1st Ruddervoorde
1st Middelkerke
2nd Zonhoven
2nd Diegem
3rd Gavere

2nd Overall UCI World Cup

1st Under-23 classification
1st Koksijde
2nd Namur
2nd Heusden-Zolder
2nd Nommay

Ethias Cross

1st Meulebeke
1st Hulst
3rd Kruibeke

Rectavit Series

1st Neerpelt

1st Gullegem
2020–2021
1st UEC European Championships
2nd Overall UCI World Cup

1st Overijse
2nd Tábor
3rd Dendermonde
3rd Hulst

2nd Overall Superprestige

1st Gieten
1st Ruddervoorde
2nd Niel
2nd Boom
2nd Heusden-Zolder
2nd Middelkerke
3rd Merksplas
3rd Gavere

3rd Overall X²O Badkamers Trophy

1st Herentals
1st Baal
1st Hamme
1st Lille
1st Brussels

Ethias Cross

1st Leuven
2nd Beringen

2021–2022
X²O Badkamers Trophy

2nd Kortrijk
2nd Baal
3rd Lille

UCI World Cup

3rd Zonhoven

3rd National Championships
2022–2023
1st Overall Superprestige

1st Niel
1st Merksplas
1st Heusden-Zolder
1st Gullegem
1st Middelkerke
3rd Ruddervoorde

2nd UEC European Championships
2nd National Championships
UCI World Cup

2nd Waterloo
2nd Val di Sole

Exact Cross

2nd Sint-Niklaas

3rd Overall X²O Badkamers Trophy

2nd Kortrijk
2nd Lille
3rd Baal
3rd Hamme

2023–2024
1st Overall UCI World Cup

1st Dendermonde
1st Troyes
1st Namur
2nd Maasmechelen
2nd Dublin
2nd Val di Sole
3rd Waterloo
3rd Benidorm
4th Antwerpen

1st Overall Superprestige

1st Niel
1st Ruddervoorde
1st Merksplas
2nd Overijse
3rd Middelkerke

2nd UEC European Championships
X²O Badkamers Trophy

3rd Koksijde

4th UCI World Championships
2024–2025
UCI World Cup

1st Namur
1st Zonhoven
5th Antwerpen
5th Maasmechelen

X²O Badkamers Trophy

1st Hamme
2nd Lokeren
3rd Herentals

Exact Cross

1st Heerderstrand
2nd Beringen

1st Ardooie
2nd Overall Superprestige

1st Ruddervoorde
1st Niel
1st Merksplas
1st Mol
2nd Diegem
3rd Gullegem

2nd UEC European Championships
2nd National Championships
2025–2026
1st National Championships
UCI World Cup

1st Zonhoven
2nd Antwerpen
2nd Benidorm
2nd Maasmechelen
3rd Flamanville
3rd Koksijde
4th Dendermonde

X²O Badkamers Trophy

1st Lille
1st Brussels

Exact Cross

1st Mol

2nd UCI World Championships
2nd Oostmalle
Superprestige

2nd Middelkerke
3rd Diegem

2026-2027
HG Cross

1st Heerderstrand
3rd Lokeren

3rd UEC European Championships

=== Mountain bike ===
2020
1st Cross-country, National Under-23 Championships
UCI Under-23 XCO World Cup

1st Nové Město II
2nd Nové Město I

3rd Cross-country, UCI World Under-23 Championships
