= Fem van Empel =

Dutch cyclist (born 2002)

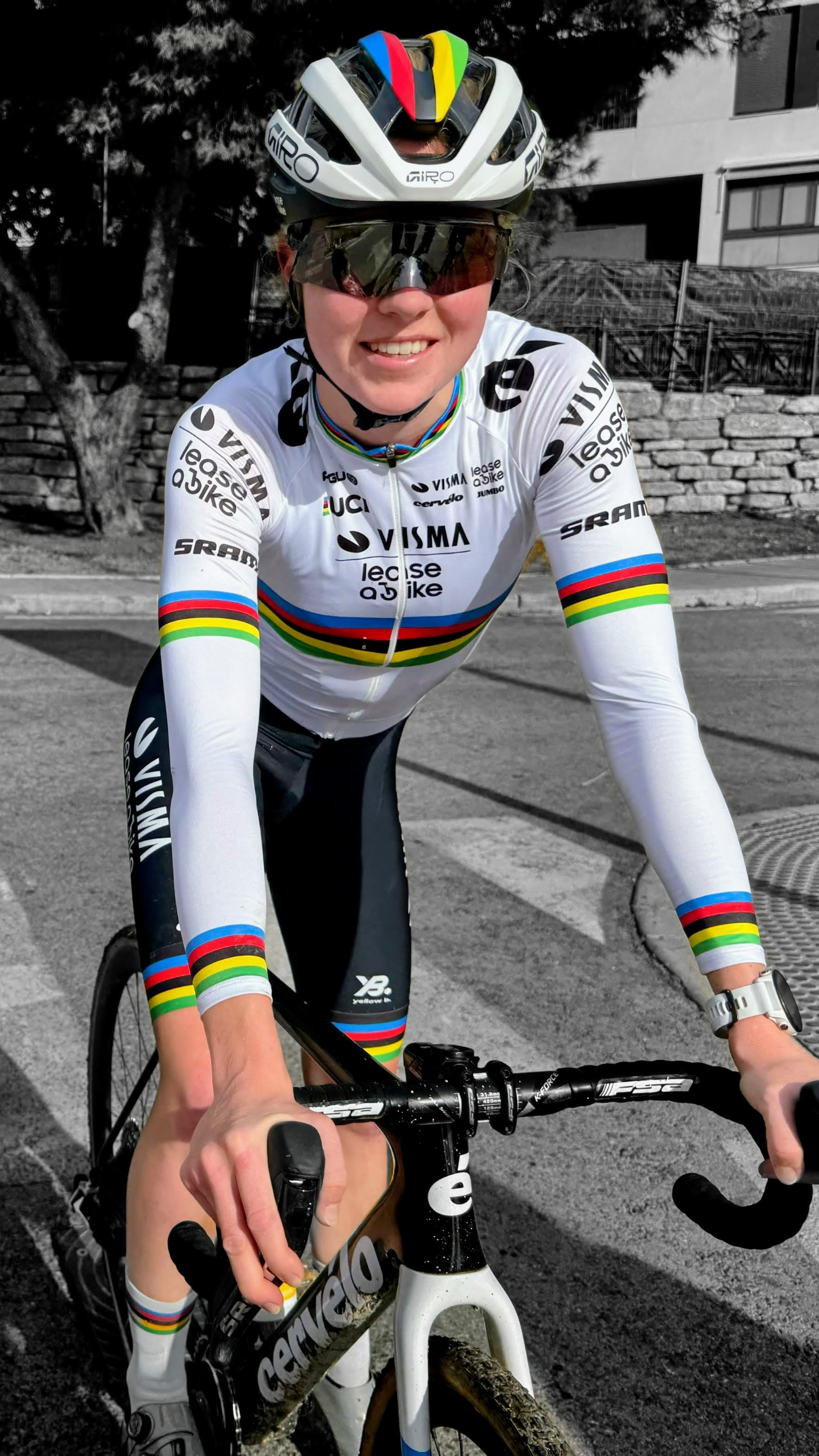
- Van Empel at the UCI Cyclocross World Cup in Benidorm in January 2025

Personal information
- Nickname: SuperFem Fem Van De Poel
- Born: 3 September 2002 (age 24) 's-Hertogenbosch, Netherlands
- Height: 1.73 m (5 ft 8 in)

Cycling career
- Sport: Cycling
- Current team: FDJ United–Suez
- Disciplines: Cyclo-cross & Road
- Role: Rider

Amateur team
- 2021: WV Schijndel

Professional teams
- 2021–2022: Pauwels Sauzen–Bingoal
- 2023-2025: Team Jumbo–Visma
- 2026: FDJ United–Suez

Major wins
- Cyclo-cross World Championships (2023, 2024, 2025) European Championships (2022, 2023, 2024) World Cup (2022–23) 18 individual wins (2021–22—2024–25) Trophy (2022–23, 2023–24)
Medal record
Representing the Netherlands
Women's cyclo-cross
World Championships
Gold medal – first place	2025 Liévin	Elite
Gold medal – first place	2024 Tábor	Elite
Gold medal – first place	2023 Hoogerheide	Elite
Gold medal – first place	2023 Hoogerheide	Team relay
Gold medal – first place	2021 Ostend	Under-23
Bronze medal – third place	2022 Fayetteville	Under-23
European Championships
Gold medal – first place	2024 Pontevedra	Elite
Gold medal – first place	2023 Pontchâteau	Elite
Gold medal – first place	2022 Namur	Elite
Bronze medal – third place	2021 Wijster	Under-23
Women's road bicycle racing
European Championships
Bronze medal – third place	2022 Anadia	Under-23 road race
Women's gravel bicycle racing
European Championships
Silver medal – second place	2023 Oud-Heverlee	Elite

Fem van Empel (born 3 September 2002) is a Dutch professional racing cyclist. In January 2021, she won the women's under-23 race at the 2021 UCI Cyclo-cross World Championships. During the 2022–2023 season she won the women's elite race at the World Championships and the European Cyclo-cross Championships. On 22 January 2023, she secured overall victory at the UCI Cyclo-cross World Cup (2022–23). On 16 February 2023 at Brussels, Fem clinched the X20 Badkamers Trophy. The previous week, her first race in the World Champions jersey, competing in the X20 Badkamers at Lille she finished 1st doing a "Pidcock" (posing as Superwoman) across the finish line. In the cyclo cross season 2023 to 2024 Fem Van Empel was first in her first eleven races. Having finished the previous season with five successive firsts, it brought her run of first places in top level Cyclocross to sixteen. Fem Van Empel retained her UCI World Championship at Tábor on 3 February 2024. One commentator (Marty McCrossan) noted he had "run out of superlatives to describe Fem's phenomenal talent", calling her "The Golden Girl of Cyclocross". Another (Ian Field) described her performance as " pretty much perfection". "Velo" noted that "her 18th victory out of what has been (so far) a 20-race season" is "a staggering success rate". Fem completed her 2023 to 2024 season with a win to take the X²O Badkamers Trophy at Lille on 11 February. This took her number of wins for the season to 19 from 21 races. At the end of season 2023 to 2024 Fem's career total number of Elite level Cyclo-cross race wins was 37. At the completion of Season 2024/2025.Fem had won her third consecutive Cyclocross world Championship, her third consecutive European Championship and had made her third consecutive wins of the prestigious Koppenberg cross, Sven Nys cross, Antwerpen cross and Benidorm UCI World Cup stage. On the 25 October 2025 Fem won The Exact Cross Heerderstrand to take her 50th win in top level Cyclocross.

In December 2025, Van Empel announced a break from professional cycling for an unspecified period of time. In September 2026, FDJ Suez announced it had signed her and she would return to cycling in the winter of 2026.

== Major results ==
=== Cyclo-cross ===
2019–2020
3rd National Junior Championships
5th UCI World Junior Championships
2020–2021
1st UCI World Under-23 Championships
UCI World Cup

4th Dendermonde

2021–2022
1st National Under-23 Championships
UCI World Cup

1st Val di Sole
1st Flamanville
4th Besançon
4th Rucphen
4th Namur
4th Hoogerheide
5th Zonhoven
5th Hulst

Superprestige

2nd Heusden-Zolder

Ethias Cross

2nd Lokeren

3rd UCI World Under-23 Championships
3rd UEC European Under-23 Championships
2022–2023
1st UCI World Championships
1st UEC European Championships
1st Overall UCI World Cup

1st Waterloo
1st Fayetteville
1st Tábor
1st Maasmechelen
1st Antwerpen
1st Dublin
1st Benidorm
2nd Beekse Bergen
2nd Overijse
2nd Hulst
3rd Zonhoven

1st Overall X²O Badkamers Trophy

1st Koppenberg
1st Baal
1st Hamme
1st Lille
1st Brussels
2nd Koksijde

Exact Cross

1st Kruibeke
1st Beringen
2nd Meulebeke

3rd National Championships
2023–2024
1st UCI World Championships
1st UEC European Championships
1st Overall X²O Badkamers Trophy

1st Koppenberg
1st Kortrijk
1st Herentals
1st Baal
1st Koksijde
1st Hamme
1st Lille

4th Overall UCI World Cup

1st Waterloo
1st Maasmechelen
1st Antwerpen
1st Benidorm
1st Hoogerheide
2nd Gavere
4th Hulst

Superprestige

1st Overijse
1st Boom
1st Heusden-Zolder

Exact Cross

1st Beringen

1st Woerden
2024–2025
1st UCI World Championships
1st UEC European Championships
2nd Overall UCI World Cup

1st Antwerpen
1st Gavere
1st Besançon
1st Benidorm
2nd Dublin
3rd Dendermonde
4th Hoogerheide

X²O Badkamers Trophy

1st Koppenberg
1st Herentals
1st Baal
3rd Koksijde

Exact Cross

1st Beringen
1st Kortrijk

Superprestige

2nd Ruddervoorde
2nd Overijse

3rd Woerden
2025-2026
1st Woerden
1st Heerderstrand

=== Gravel ===
2023
1st National Championships
2nd UEC European Championships

=== Mountain bike ===
2019
3rd Cross-country, National Junior Championships
2020
2nd Cross-country, National Junior Championships
3rd Eliminator, UCI World Championships
2021
2nd Eliminator, UEC European Championships
2022
1st Cross-country, National Under-23 Championships
2nd Cross-country, UEC European Under-23 Championships

=== Road ===
2022
3rd Road race, UEC European Under-23 Championships
2023
1st Stage 3 Tour de l'Avenir
6th Arnhem–Veenendaal Classic
8th Road race, UEC European Under-23 Championships
2024
8th La Flèche Wallonne
