= Grand Prix Sven Nys =

GP Sven Nys

Race details
- Date: 1 January
- Region: Baal, Belgium
- Local name(s): Grote Prijs Sven Nys (in Dutch)
- Discipline: Cyclo-cross
- Competition: Cyclo-cross Trophy
- Type: one-day
- Web site: www.gpsvennys.be

History (men)
- First edition: 2000
- Editions: 26 (as of 2025)
- First winner: Sven Nys (BEL)
- Most wins: Sven Nys (BEL) (12 wins)
- Most recent: Eli Iserbyt (BEL)

History (women)
- First edition: 2012
- Editions: 14 (as of 2025)
- First winner: Daphny van den Brand (NED)
- Most wins: Fem van Empel (NED); (3 wins)
- Most recent: Fem van Empel (NED)

The Grand Prix Sven Nys or GP Sven Nys is a cyclo-cross race held in Baal, Belgium. The race is named after cyclo-cross legend Sven Nys who is a citizen of Baal. Nys won his "own" race 12 out of 16 times he competed. He was sick at home for the 14th edition in 2013. The race is part of the X²O Badkamers Trophy.

== Podiums ==
=== Men ===
Year	Winner	Second	Third
2025	(Belgium) Eli Iserbyt	(Netherlands) Pim Ronhaar	(Belgium) Emiel Verstrynge
2024	(Netherlands) Mathieu van der Poel	(Belgium) Wout van Aert	(Netherlands) Pim Ronhaar
2023	(Belgium) Eli Iserbyt	(Belgium) Michael Vanthourenhout	(United Kingdom) Tom Pidcock
2022	(Belgium) Wout van Aert	(United Kingdom) Tom Pidcock	(Belgium) Eli Iserbyt
2021	(Netherlands) Mathieu van der Poel	(Belgium) Wout van Aert	(United Kingdom) Tom Pidcock
2020	(Netherlands) Mathieu van der Poel	(Belgium) Eli Iserbyt	(United Kingdom) Tom Pidcock
2019	(Netherlands) Mathieu van der Poel	(Belgium) Toon Aerts	(Belgium) Laurens Sweeck
2018	(Netherlands) Mathieu van der Poel	(Belgium) Wout Van Aert	(Netherlands) Corné van Kessel
2017	(Belgium) Toon Aerts	(Belgium) Wout Van Aert	(Belgium) Michael Vanthourenhout
2016	(Belgium) Wout Van Aert	(Belgium) Sven Nys	(Belgium) Toon Aerts
2015	(Belgium) Wout Van Aert	(Netherlands) Lars van der Haar	(Belgium) Kevin Pauwels
2014	(Belgium) Sven Nys	(Czech Republic) Zdeněk Štybar	(Belgium) Niels Albert
2013	(Belgium) Kevin Pauwels	(Czech Republic) Zdeněk Štybar	(Belgium) Niels Albert
2012	(Belgium) Sven Nys	(Belgium) Kevin Pauwels	(Belgium) Bart Wellens
2011	(Belgium) Sven Nys	(Czech Republic) Zdeněk Štybar	(Belgium) Niels Albert
2010	(Belgium) Sven Nys	(Czech Republic) Zdeněk Štybar	(Belgium) Niels Albert
2009	(Belgium) Sven Nys	(Czech Republic) Zdeněk Štybar	(Belgium) Niels Albert
2008	(Belgium) Sven Nys	(Czech Republic) Zdeněk Štybar	(Belgium) Kevin Pauwels
2007	(Belgium) Sven Nys	(Netherlands) Lars Boom	(Belgium) Niels Albert
2006	(Netherlands) Lars Boom	(Belgium) Sven Nys	(Belgium) Niels Albert
2005	(Belgium) Sven Nys	(Belgium) Bart Wellens	(Belgium) Sven Vanthourenhout
2004	(Belgium) Sven Nys	(Belgium) Ben Berden	(Belgium) Tom Vannoppen
2003	(Belgium) Sven Nys	(Belgium) Mario De Clercq	(Belgium) Ben Berden
2002	(Belgium) Mario De Clercq	(Belgium) Sven Nys	(Belgium) Ben Berden
2001	(Belgium) Sven Nys	(Belgium) Mario De Clercq	(Belgium) Peter Van Santvliet
2000	(Belgium) Sven Nys	(Netherlands) Richard Groenendaal	(Netherlands) Adrie van der Poel

=== Women ===
Year	Winner	Second	Third
2025	(Netherlands) Fem van Empel	(Netherlands) Lucinda Brand	(Netherlands) Puck Pieterse
2024	(Netherlands) Fem van Empel	(Netherlands) Lucinda Brand	(Canada) Ava Holmgren
2023	(Netherlands) Fem van Empel	(Netherlands) Lucinda Brand	(Netherlands) Ceylin del Carmen Alvarado
2022	(Netherlands) Lucinda Brand	(Netherlands) Ceylin del Carmen Alvarado	(Netherlands) Denise Betsema
2021	(Netherlands) Ceylin del Carmen Alvarado	(Netherlands) Lucinda Brand	(Netherlands) Denise Betsema
2020	(Netherlands) Ceylin del Carmen Alvarado	(Netherlands) Lucinda Brand	(Netherlands) Annemarie Worst
2019	(Switzerland) Jolanda Neff	(Belgium) Sanne Cant	(United Kingdom) Nikki Brammeier
2018	(United States) Katie Compton	(Netherlands) Annemarie Worst	(Netherlands) Maud Kaptheijns
2017	(Netherlands) Marianne Vos	(Belgium) Ellen Van Loy	(Netherlands) Thalita de Jong
2016	(Belgium) Sanne Cant	(Belgium) Ellen Van Loy	(United Kingdom) Helen Wyman
2015	(Czech Republic) Kateřina Nash	(Belgium) Sanne Cant	(Belgium) Ellen Van Loy
2014	(United States) Katie Compton	(Netherlands) Marianne Vos	(United Kingdom) Nikki Harris
2013	(Czech Republic) Kateřina Nash	(United Kingdom) Nikki Harris	(Belgium) Sanne Cant
2012	(Netherlands) Daphny van den Brand	(Belgium) Sanne Cant	(United Kingdom) Nikki Harris
