= Scheldecross Antwerpen =

Scheldecross

Race details
- Region: Antwerpen, Belgium
- English name: Scheldt cross
- Local name: Scheldecross (in Dutch)
- Discipline: Cyclo-cross
- Competition: UCI Cyclo-cross World Cup

History
- First edition: 2005
- Editions: 19 (as of 2024)
- First winner: Sven Nys (BEL)
- Most wins: Mathieu van der Poel (NED) (8 wins)
- Most recent: Mathieu van der Poel (NED)

The Scheldecross Antwerpen is a cyclo-cross race held in Antwerp (Antwerpen), Belgium. Since 2015 it is part of the DVV Trophy, but in 2021 it moved to the UCI World Cup.

== Past winners ==
Year	Men's winner	Women's winner
2025	Mathieu van der Poel (NED)	Lucinda Brand (NED)
2024	Eli Iserbyt (BEL)	Fem van Empel (NED)
2023	Mathieu van der Poel (NED)	Fem van Empel (NED)
2022	Mathieu van der Poel (NED)	Fem van Empel (NED)
2021	Cancelled due to COVID-19 pandemic	
Dec. 2020	Mathieu van der Poel (NED)	Denise Betsema (NED)
2019	Not held due to organization of Belgian National Cyclo-cross Championships in Jan. 2020	
2018	Mathieu van der Poel (NED)	Denise Betsema (NED)
2017	Mathieu van der Poel (NED)	Sanne Cant (BEL)
2016	Mathieu van der Poel (NED)	Sanne Cant (BEL)
2015	Wout Van Aert (BEL)	Sanne Cant (BEL)
2014	Mathieu van der Poel (NED)	Sanne Cant (BEL)
2013	Niels Albert (BEL)	Katie Compton (USA)
2012	Kevin Pauwels (BEL)	Katie Compton (USA)
2011	Sven Nys (BEL)	Katie Compton (USA)
2010	Radomír Šimůnek, Jr. (CZE)	Hanka Kupfernagel (GER)
2009	Sven Nys (BEL)	Not held
2008	Thijs Al (NED)	Hanka Kupfernagel (GER)
2007 Dec	Radomír Šimůnek, Jr. (CZE)	Daphny van den Brand (NED)
2007 Jan	Niels Albert (BEL)	Marianne Vos (NED)
2005	Sven Nys (BEL)	Kathy Ingels (BEL)
