= List of rosters for DSB Bank and its successors =

This page lists the rosters, by season, of the UCI Women's Team, WM3 Pro Cycling.

== 2016 ==
As of 1 January 2016. Ages as of 1 January 2016.

| Rider | Date of birth |
|---|---|
| Lucinda Brand (NED) | 2 July 1989 (aged 26) |
| Thalita de Jong (NED) | 6 November 1993 (aged 22) |
| Pauline Ferrand-Prévot (FRA) | 10 February 1992 (aged 23) |
| Shara Gillow (AUS) | 23 December 1987 (aged 28) |
| Yara Kastelijn (NED) | 9 August 1997 (aged 18) |
| Roxane Knetemann (NED) | 1 April 1987 (aged 28) |

| Rider | Date of birth |
|---|---|
| Jeanne Korevaar (NED) | 24 September 1996 (aged 19) |
| Anouska Koster (NED) | 20 August 1993 (aged 22) |
| Katarzyna Niewiadoma (POL) | 29 September 1994 (aged 21) |
| Moniek Tenniglo (NED) | 2 May 1988 (aged 27) |
| Anna van der Breggen (NED) | 18 April 1990 (aged 25) |
| Marianne Vos (NED) | 13 May 1987 (aged 28) |

== 2015 ==
As of 1 January 2016. Ages as of 1 January 2016.

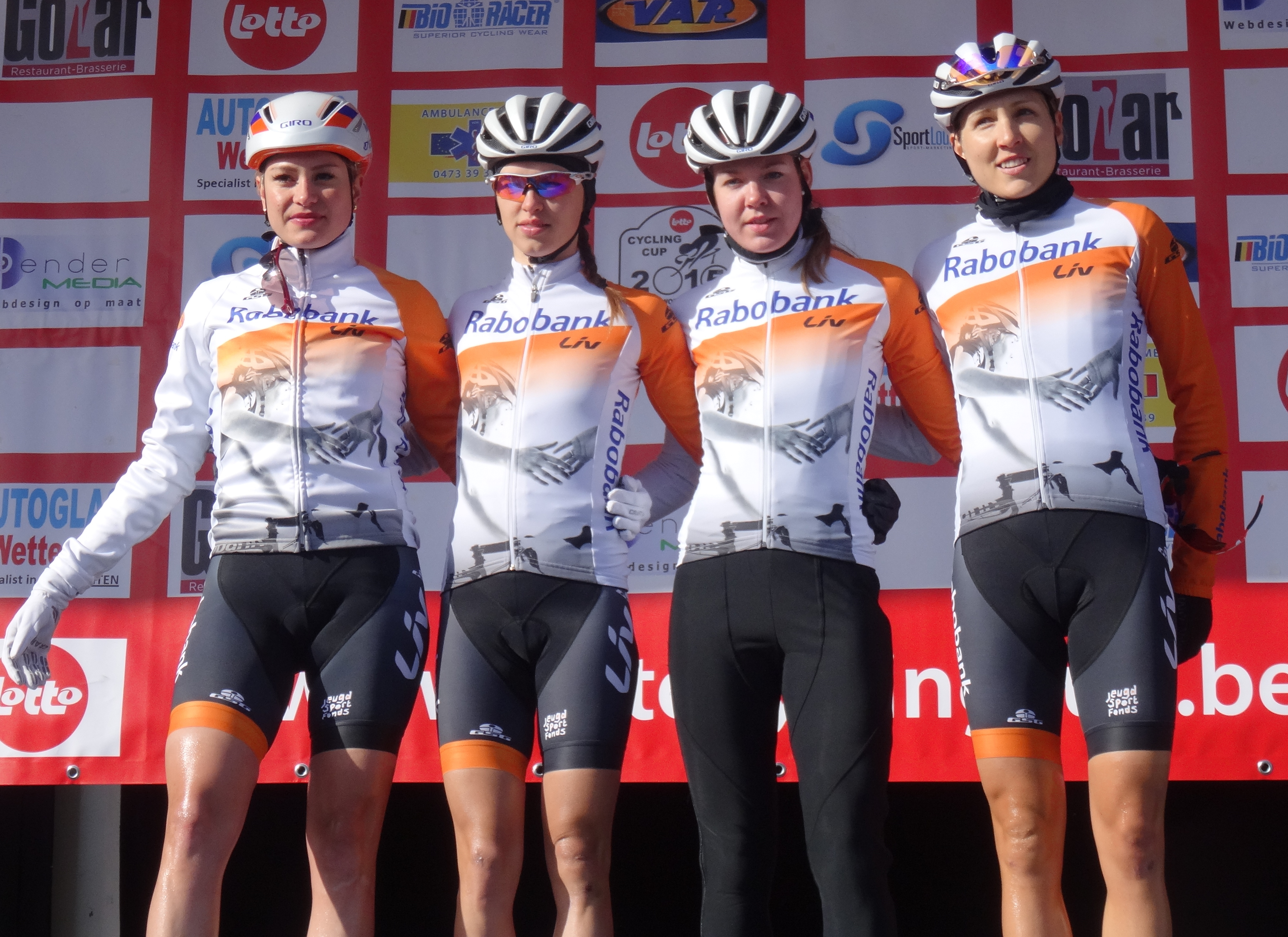
The squad during the 2015 Le Samyn des Dames

| Rider | Date of birth |
|---|---|
| Marianne Vos (NED) | May 13, 1987 (aged 28) |
| Anna van der Breggen (NED) | April 18, 1990 (aged 25) |
| Roxane Knetemann (NED) | April 1, 1987 (aged 28) |
| Lucinda Brand (NED) | July 2, 1989 (aged 26) |
| Thalita de Jong (NED) | November 6, 1993 (aged 22) |
| Anouska Koster (NED) | August 20, 1993 (aged 22) |

| Rider | Date of birth |
|---|---|
| Moniek Tenniglo (NED) | May 2, 1988 (aged 27) |
| Jeanne Korevaar (NED) | September 24, 1996 (aged 19) |
| Pauline Ferrand-Prévot (FRA) | February 10, 1992 (aged 23) |
| Katarzyna Niewiadoma (POL) | September 29, 1994 (aged 21) |
| Shara Gillow (AUS) | December 23, 1986 (aged 29) |

== 2014 ==
Ages as of 1 January 2014

| Rider | Date of birth |
|---|---|
| Lucinda Brand (NED) | October 22, 1989 (aged 24) |
| Thalita de Jong (NED) | June 11, 1993 (aged 20) |
| Pauline Ferrand-Prévot (FRA) | February 10, 1992 (aged 21) |
| Anna Knauer (GER) | February 20, 1990 (aged 23) |
| Roxane Knetemann (NED) | April 1, 1987 (aged 26) |
| Katarzyna Niewiadoma (POL) | September 29, 1994 (aged 19) |

| Rider | Date of birth |
|---|---|
| Iris Slappendel (NED) | February 18, 1985 (aged 28) |
| Sabrina Stultiens (NED) | July 8, 1993 (aged 20) |
| Anna van der Breggen (NED) | April 18, 1990 (aged 23) |
| Annemiek van Vleuten (NED) | October 8, 1982 (aged 31) |
| Marianne Vos (NED) | May 13, 1987 (aged 26) |

== 2013 ==
As of 12 July 2013.

| Rider | Date of birth |
|---|---|
| Lucinda Brand (NED) | 2 July 1989 (age 35) |
| Pauline Ferrand-Prévot (FRA) | 10 February 1992 (age 33) |
| Megan Guarnier (USA) | 4 May 1985 (age 39) |
| Thalita de Jong (NED) | 6 November 1993 (age 31) |
| Roxane Knetemann (NED) | 1 April 1987 (age 37) |
| Jolanda Neff (SUI) | 5 January 1993 (age 32) |
| Sanne van Paassen (NED) | 27 October 1988 (age 36) |

| Rider | Date of birth |
|---|---|
| Iris Slappendel (NED) | 18 February 1985 (age 40) |
| Sabrina Stultiens (NED) | 8 July 1993 (age 31) |
| Rebecca Talen (NED) | 27 October 1993 (age 31) |
| Annemiek van Vleuten (NED) | 8 October 1982 (age 42) |
| Liesbet De Vocht (BEL) | 5 January 1979 (age 46) |
| Marianne Vos (NED) | 13 May 1987 (age 37) |

== 2012 ==
Ages as of 1 January 2012.

| Rider | Date of birth |
|---|---|
| Tatiana Antoshina (RUS) | July 27, 1982 (aged 30) |
| Liesbet De Vocht (BEL) | January 5, 1979 (aged 33) |
| Sarah Düster (GER) | July 10, 1982 (aged 30) |
| Pauline Ferrand-Prévot (FRA) | February 10, 1992 (aged 20) |
| Thalita de Jong (NED) | November 6, 1993 (aged 19) |
| Lauren Kitchen (NOR) | November 21, 1990 (aged 22) |
| Roxane Knetemann (NED) | April 1, 1987 (aged 25) |

| Rider | Date of birth |
|---|---|
| Iris Slappendel (NED) | February 18, 1985 (aged 27) |
| Sabrina Stultiens (NED) | July 8, 1993 (aged 19) |
| Rebecca Talen (NED) | October 27, 1993 (aged 19) |
| Monique van der Vorst (NED) | November 20, 1984 (aged 28) |
| Sanne van Paassen (NED) | October 27, 1988 (aged 24) |
| Annemiek van Vleuten (NED) | October 8, 1982 (aged 30) |
| Marianne Vos (NED) | May 13, 1987 (aged 25) |

== 2011 ==
Ages as of 1 January 2011.

| Rider | Date of birth |
|---|---|
| Emilie Aubry (SUI) | February 16, 1989 (aged 21) |
| Sarah Düster (GER) | July 10, 1982 (aged 28) |
| Loes Gunnewijk (NED) | November 27, 1980 (aged 30) |
| Janneke Kanis (NED) | February 15, 1985 (aged 25) |
| Marianne Peltzer (NED) | February 11, 1986 (aged 24) |
| Patricia Schwager (SUI) | December 6, 1983 (aged 27) |

| Rider | Date of birth |
|---|---|
| Noortje Tabak (NED) | July 13, 1988 (aged 22) |
| Emma Trott (GBR) | December 24, 1989 (aged 21) |
| Marieke van Wanroij (NED) | July 5, 1979 (aged 31) |
| Annemiek van Vleuten (NED) | October 8, 1982 (aged 28) |
| Marianne Vos (NED) | May 13, 1987 (aged 23) |
