= 2016 Belgium Tour =

2016 Lotto-Belisol Belgium Tour
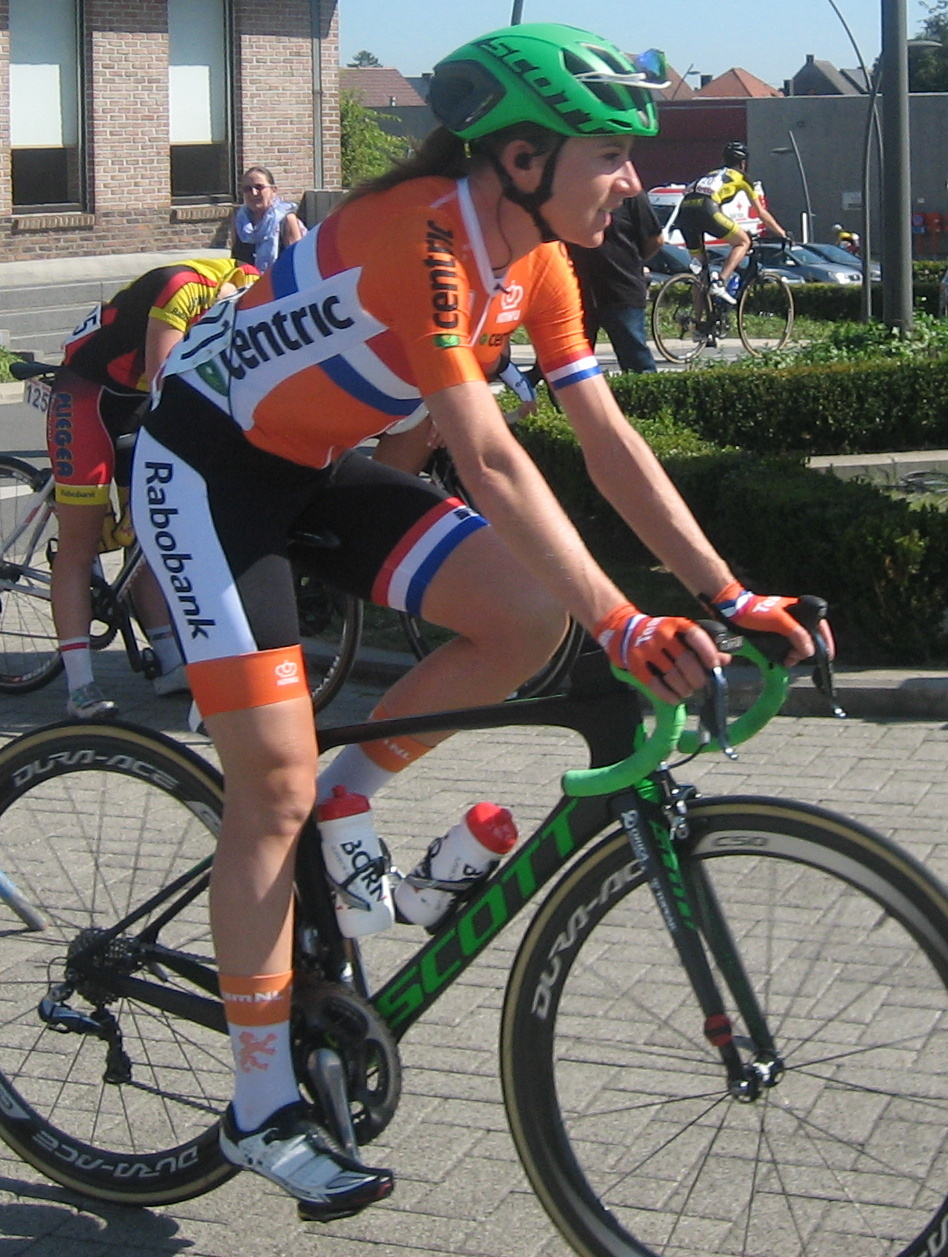
- Overall winner Annemiek van Vleuten

Race details
- Dates: 6–9 September 2016
- Stages: 4
- Distance: 331 km (206 mi)

Results
Jersey awarded to the overall winner	Winner	Annemiek van Vleuten (NED)	(Orica–AIS)
	Second	Marianne Vos (NED)	(Rabobank-Liv Woman Cycling Team)
	Third	Lucinda Brand (NED)	(Rabobank-Liv Woman Cycling Team)
Jersey awarded to the points classification winner	Points	Marianne Vos (NED)	(Rabobank-Liv Woman Cycling Team)
Jersey awarded to the mountains classification winner	Mountains	Alexandra Nessmar (SWE)	(Lares–Waowdeals)
Jersey awarded to the youth classification winner	Youth	Lotte Kopecky (BEL)	(Lotto–Soudal Ladies)
Jersey awarded to the sprints classification winner	Sprints	Marianne Vos (NED)	(Rabobank-Liv Woman Cycling Team)
	Team	Rabobank-Liv Woman Cycling Team	

The 2016 Lotto Belgium Tour is the fourth edition of the Lotto-Belisol Belgium Tour, previous called Lotto-Decca Tour, a women's cycle stage race in Belgium. The tour has an UCI rating of 2.1.

== Route ==
Stage characteristics and winners
Stage	Date	Course	Distance	Type	Stage winner
P	6 September	Nieuwpoort	4.37 km (2.72 mi)	Individual time trial	Annemiek van Vleuten (NED)
1	7 September	Moorslede to Moorslede	121.4 km (75.4 mi)	Medium mountain stage	Lucinda Brand (NED)
2	8 September	Lierde to Lierde	107.9 km (67.0 mi)	Flat stage	Marianne Vos (NED)
3	9 September	Geraardsbergen to Geraardsbergen	97.2 km (60.4 mi)	Flat stage	Annemiek van Vleuten (NED)

== Stages ==
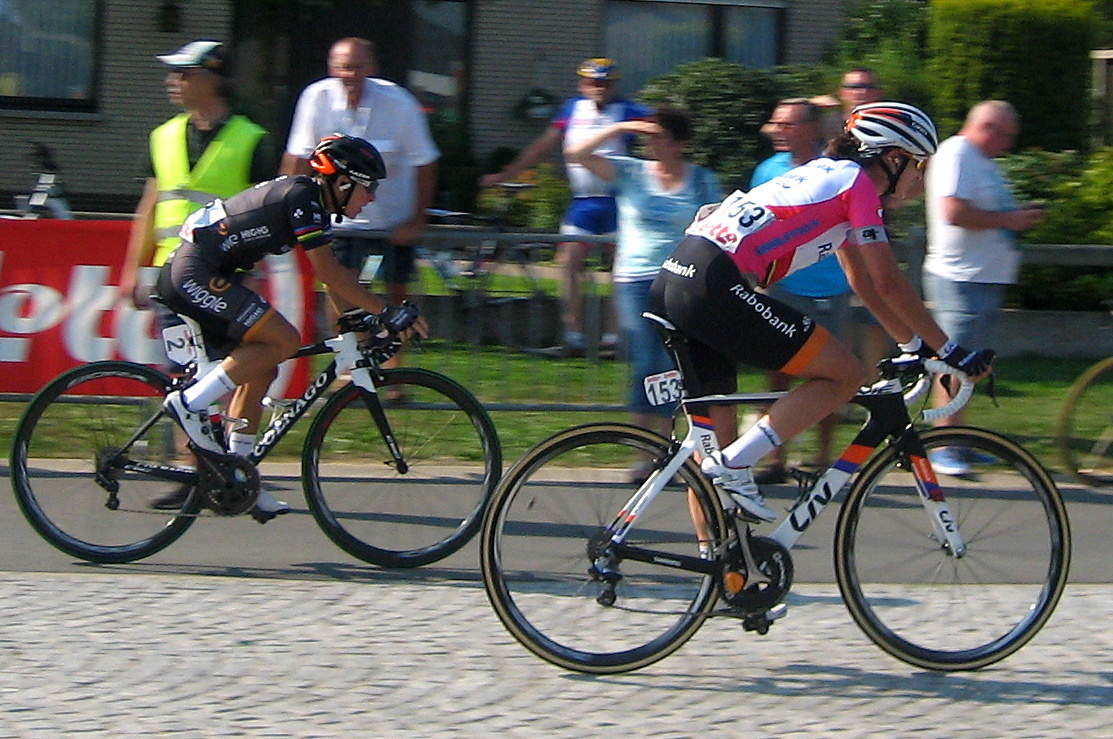
Vos won stage 2 sprint of Bronzini.

=== Prologue ===
6 September – Nieuwpoort to Nieuwpoort, 4.4 km (2.7 mi)

Prologue result

Rank	Rider	Team	Time
1	Annemiek van Vleuten (NED)	Netherlands	5' 25"
2	Thalita de Jong (NED)	Rabobank-Liv Woman Cycling Team	+ 7"
3	Lisa Brennauer (GER)	Canyon//SRAM	s.t.
4	Lucinda Brand (NED)	Rabobank-Liv Woman Cycling Team	s.t.
5	Marianne Vos (NED)	Rabobank-Liv Woman Cycling Team	+ 9"
6	Lotte Kopecky (BEL)	Lotto–Soudal Ladies	+ 10"
7	Mieke Kröger (GER)	Canyon//SRAM	+ 11"
8	Elisa Longo Borghini (ITA)	Wiggle High5	+ 12"
9	Moniek Tenniglo (NED)	Rabobank-Liv Woman Cycling Team	+ 13"
10	Emilia Fahlin (SWE)	Alé–Cipollini	+ 14"

General classification after Prologue

Rank	Rider	Team	Time
1	Annemiek van Vleuten (NED)	Netherlands	5' 24"
2	Thalita de Jong (NED)	Rabobank-Liv Woman Cycling Team	+ 7"
3	Lisa Brennauer (GER)	Canyon//SRAM	+ 8"
4	Lucinda Brand (NED)	Rabobank-Liv Woman Cycling Team	s.t.
5	Marianne Vos (NED)	Rabobank-Liv Woman Cycling Team	+ 9"
6	Lotte Kopecky (BEL)	Lotto–Soudal Ladies	+ 10"
7	Mieke Kröger (GER)	Canyon//SRAM	+ 12"
8	Elisa Longo Borghini (ITA)	Wiggle High5	s.t.
9	Moniek Tenniglo (NED)	Rabobank-Liv Woman Cycling Team	+ 13"
10	Emilia Fahlin (SWE)	Alé–Cipollini	+ 14"

=== Stage 1 ===
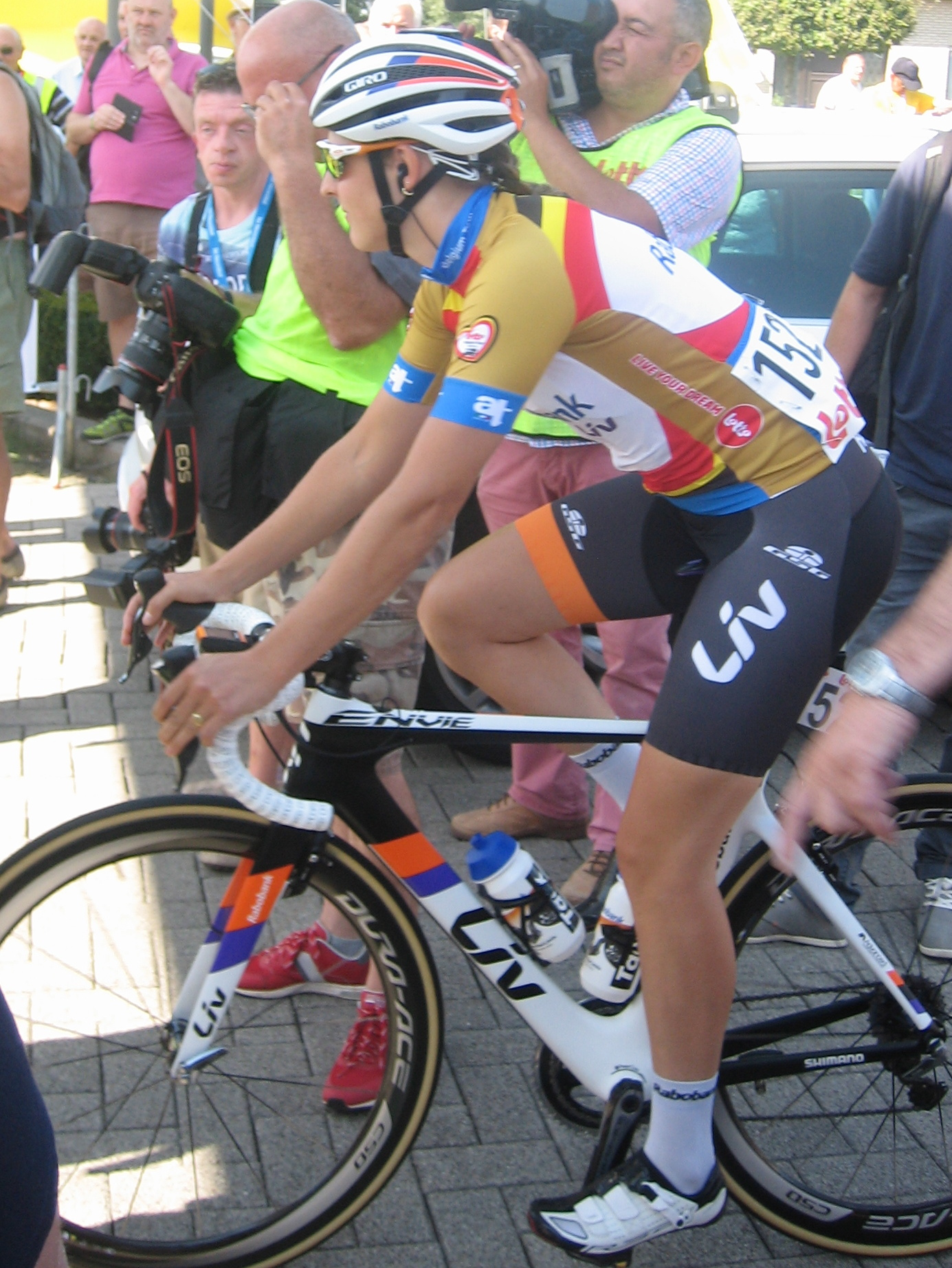
Brand wearing gold leaders jersey.

7 September – Moorslede to Moorslede, 121.5 km (75.5 mi)

Stage 1 result

Rank	Rider	Team	Time
1	Lucinda Brand (NED)	Rabobank-Liv Woman Cycling Team	3h 14' 10"
2	Barbara Guarischi (ITA)	Canyon//SRAM	s.t.
3	Marianne Vos (NED)	Rabobank-Liv Woman Cycling Team	s.t.
4	Marta Bastianelli (ITA)	Alé–Cipollini	s.t.
5	Giorgia Bronzini (ITA)	Wiggle High5	s.t.
6	Tiffany Cromwell (AUS)	Canyon//SRAM	s.t.
7	Lotte Kopecky (BEL)	Lotto–Soudal Ladies	s.t.
8	Sara Mustonen (SWE)	Team Liv–Plantur	s.t.
9	Monique van de Ree (NED)	Lares–Waowdeals	s.t.
10	Simona Frapporti (ITA)	Team Hitec Products	s.t.

General classification after Stage 1

Rank	Rider	Team	Time
1	Lucinda Brand (NED)	Rabobank-Liv Woman Cycling Team	3h 19' 32"
2	Annemiek van Vleuten (NED)	Netherlands	+ 2"
3	Marianne Vos (NED)	Rabobank-Liv Woman Cycling Team	+ 7"
4	Lotte Kopecky (BEL)	Lotto–Soudal Ladies	+ 9"
5	Lisa Brennauer (GER)	Canyon//SRAM	+ 10"
6	Elisa Longo Borghini (ITA)	Wiggle High5	+ 14"
7	Thalita de Jong (NED)	Rabobank-Liv Woman Cycling Team	+ 15"
8	Élise Delzenne (FRA)	Lotto–Soudal Ladies	+ 17"
9	Tiffany Cromwell (AUS)	Canyon//SRAM	+ 18"
10	Emma Johansson (SWE)	Wiggle High5	+ 22"

=== Stage 2 ===
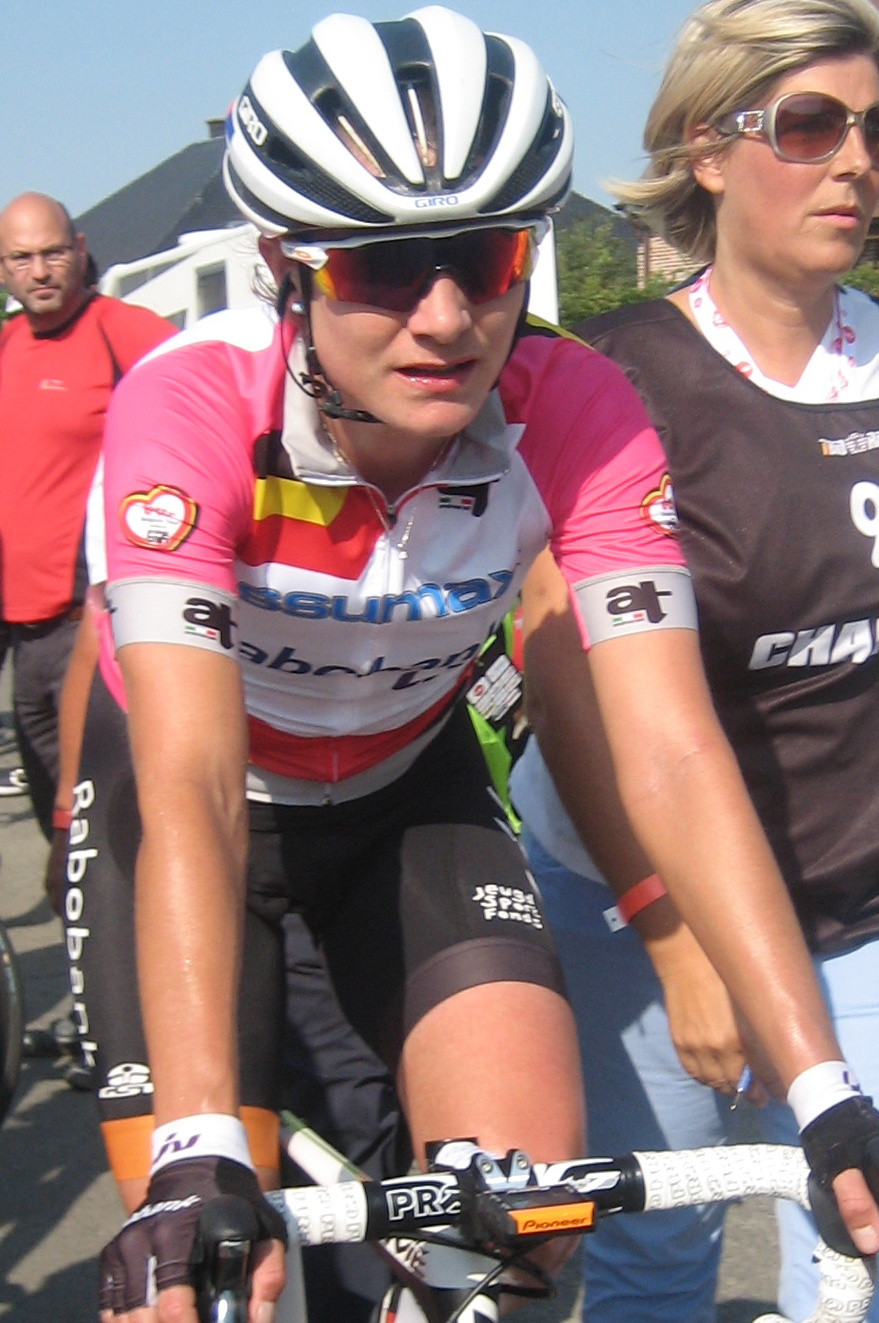
Vos wearing the pink points jersey.

8 September – Lierde to Lierde, 107.9 km (67.0 mi)

Stage 2 result

Rank	Rider	Team	Time
1	Marianne Vos (NED)	Rabobank-Liv Woman Cycling Team	2h 56' 50"
2	Giorgia Bronzini (ITA)	Wiggle High5	s.t.
3	Lotte Kopecky (BEL)	Lotto–Soudal Ladies	s.t.
4	Lisa Brennauer (GER)	Canyon//SRAM	s.t.
5	Emilia Fahlin (SWE)	Alé–Cipollini	s.t.
6	Marta Bastianelli (ITA)	Alé–Cipollini	s.t.
7	Élise Delzenne (FRA)	Lotto–Soudal Ladies	s.t.
8	Simona Frapporti (ITA)	Team Hitec Products	s.t.
9	Valerie Demey (BEL)	Topsport Vlaanderen–Etixx–Guill D'or	s.t.
10	Annemiek van Vleuten (NED)	Netherlands	s.t.

General classification after Stage 2

Rank	Rider	Team	Time
1	Marianne Vos (NED)	Rabobank-Liv Woman Cycling Team	6h 16' 14"
2	Lucinda Brand (NED)	Rabobank-Liv Woman Cycling Team	+ 4"
3	Annemiek van Vleuten (NED)	Netherlands	+ 10"
4	Lotte Kopecky (BEL)	Lotto–Soudal Ladies	s.t.
5	Lisa Brennauer (GER)	Canyon//SRAM	+ 18"
6	Elisa Longo Borghini (ITA)	Wiggle High5	+ 22"
7	Thalita de Jong (NED)	Rabobank-Liv Woman Cycling Team	+ 23"
8	Élise Delzenne (FRA)	Lotto–Soudal Ladies	+ 25"
9	Tiffany Cromwell (AUS)	Canyon//SRAM	+ 26"
10	Emma Johansson (SWE)	Wiggle High5	+ 30"

=== Stage 3 ===
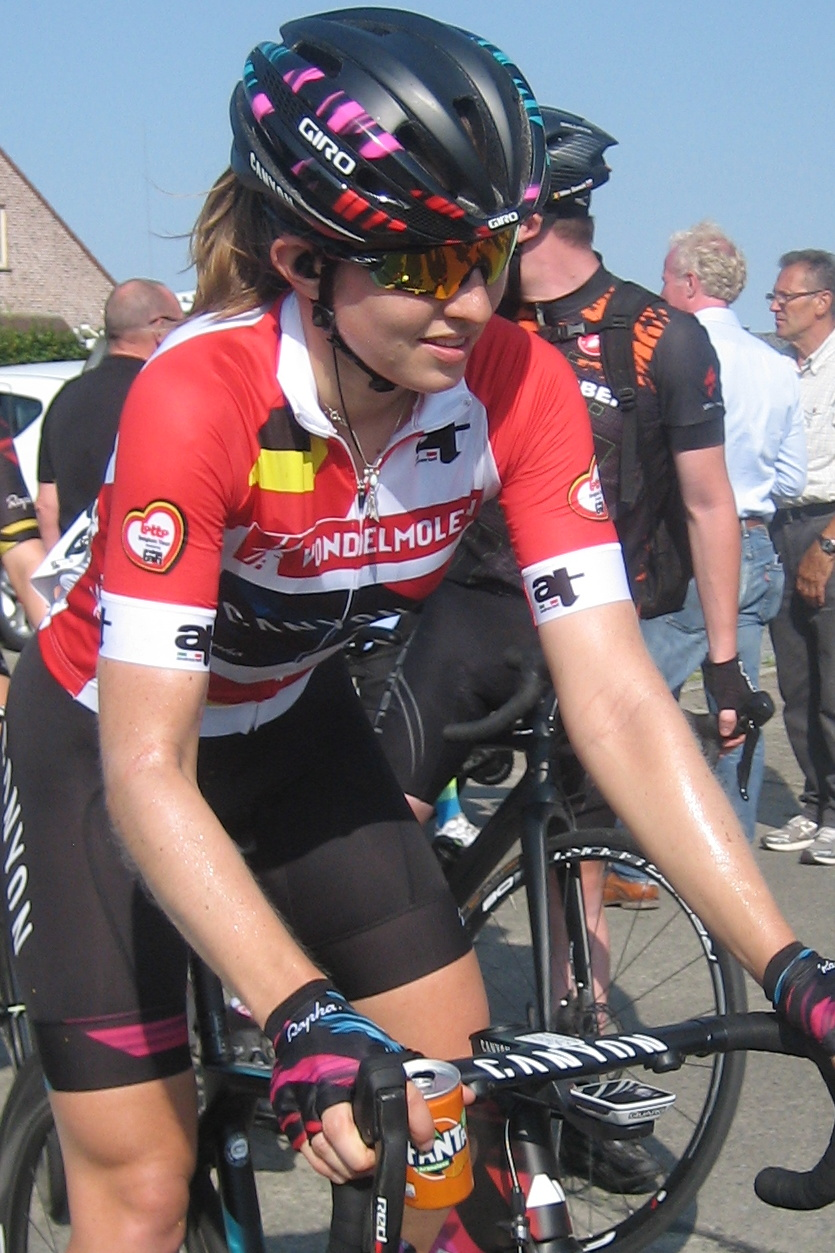
Ryan wearing the red sprints jersey.

9 September – Geraardsbergen to Geraardsbergen, 97.3 km (60.5 mi)

Stage 3 result

Rank	Rider	Team	Time
1	Annemiek van Vleuten (NED)	Netherlands	2h 40' 30"
2	Marta Bastianelli (ITA)	Alé–Cipollini	+ 1' 04"
3	Kaat Hannes (BEL)	Lensworld–Zannata	s.t.
4	Marianne Vos (NED)	Rabobank-Liv Woman Cycling Team	s.t.
5	Élise Delzenne (FRA)	Lotto–Soudal Ladies	s.t.
6	Lucinda Brand (NED)	Rabobank-Liv Woman Cycling Team	s.t.
7	Emma Johansson (SWE)	Wiggle High5	s.t.
8	Lotte Kopecky (BEL)	Lotto–Soudal Ladies	s.t.
9	Valerie Demey (BEL)	Topsport Vlaanderen–Etixx–Guill D'or	s.t.
10	Emilia Fahlin (SWE)	Alé–Cipollini	s.t.

General classification after Stage 3

Rank	Rider	Team	Time
1	Annemiek van Vleuten (NED)	Netherlands	8h 56' 41"
2	Marianne Vos (NED)	Rabobank-Liv Woman Cycling Team	+ 1' 04"
3	Lucinda Brand (NED)	Rabobank-Liv Woman Cycling Team	+ 1' 10"
4	Lotte Kopecky (BEL)	Lotto–Soudal Ladies	+ 1' 16"
5	Lisa Brennauer (GER)	Canyon//SRAM	+ 1' 23"
6	Élise Delzenne (FRA)	Lotto–Soudal Ladies	+ 1' 32"
7	Emma Johansson (SWE)	Wiggle High5	+ 1' 37"
8	Marta Bastianelli (ITA)	Alé–Cipollini	+ 1' 41"
9	Elisa Longo Borghini (ITA)	Wiggle High5	+ 1' 43"
10	Emilia Fahlin (SWE)	Alé–Cipollini	s.t.

== Classification leadership ==
Stage	Winner	General classification	Points classification	Mountains classification	Young rider classification	Belgian Riders	Sprints classification	Team classification
P	Annemiek van Vleuten	Annemiek van Vleuten	Annemiek van Vleuten	not award	Thalita de Jong	Lotte Kopecky	not award	Rabobank-Liv Woman Cycling Team
1	Lucinda Brand	Lucinda Brand	Lucinda Brand	not award	Lotte Kopecky	Lotte Kopecky	Alexis Ryan	Rabobank-Liv Woman Cycling Team
2	Marianne Vos	Marianne Vos	Marianne Vos	Anisha Vekemans	Lotte Kopecky	Lotte Kopecky	Lotte Kopecky	Rabobank-Liv Woman Cycling Team
3	Annemiek van Vleuten	Annemiek van Vleuten	Marianne Vos	Alexandra Nessmar	Lotte Kopecky	Lotte Kopecky	Marianne Vos	Rabobank-Liv Woman Cycling Team
Final Classification		Annemiek van Vleuten	Marianne Vos	Alexandra Nessmar	Lotte Kopecky	Lotte Kopecky	Marianne Vos	Rabobank-Liv Woman Cycling Team

== See also ==
- 2016 in women's road cycling
