= 2021–22 Cyclo-cross Superprestige =

Cyclo-cross competition held in Belgium and the Netherlands

Details
- Location: Belgium & Netherlands
- Races: ~~8~~ 7

Champions
- Male individual champion: Eli Iserbyt (BEL) (Pauwels Sauzen–Bingoal)
- Female individual champion: Lucinda Brand (NED) (Baloise–Trek Lions)

The 2021–22 Cyclo-cross Superprestige – also known as the Telenet Superprestige for sponsorship reasons – is a season-long cyclo-cross competition held in Belgium and the Netherlands. Originally planned for 8 rounds, in December 2021 due to heightened measures to combat the COVID-19 pandemic in Belgium the manche in Diegem was cancelled.

== Calendar ==
=== Men's competition ===
| Date | Race | Winner | Team | Competition leader |
|---|---|---|---|---|
| 3 October | Gieten | Toon Aerts (BEL) | Baloise–Trek Lions | Toon Aerts (BEL) |
| 23 October | Ruddervoorde | Eli Iserbyt (BEL) | Pauwels Sauzen–Bingoal | Eli Iserbyt (BEL) |
| 11 November | Niel | Eli Iserbyt (BEL) | Pauwels Sauzen–Bingoal | |
| 20 November | Merksplas | Eli Iserbyt (BEL) | Pauwels Sauzen–Bingoal | Eli Iserbyt (BEL) |
| 4 December | Boom | Wout van Aert (BEL) | Team Jumbo–Visma | Eli Iserbyt (BEL) |
| 27 December | Heusden-Zolder | Wout van Aert (BEL) | Team Jumbo–Visma | Eli Iserbyt (BEL) |
| 29 December | Diegem | Cancelled due to the COVID-19 pandemic | | |
| 12 February | Gavere | Lars van der Haar (NED) | Baloise–Trek Lions | Eli Iserbyt (BEL) |

=== Women's competition ===
| Date | Race | Winner | Team | Competition leader |
|---|---|---|---|---|
| 3 October | Gieten | Lucinda Brand (NED) | Baloise–Trek Lions | Lucinda Brand (NED) |
| 23 October | Ruddervoorde | Denise Betsema (NED) | Pauwels Sauzen–Bingoal | Denise Betsema (NED) |
| 11 November | Niel | Lucinda Brand (NED) | Baloise–Trek Lions | Denise Betsema (NED) |
| 20 November | Merksplas | Lucinda Brand (NED) | Baloise–Trek Lions | Lucinda Brand (NED) |
| 4 December | Boom | Lucinda Brand (NED) | Baloise–Trek Lions | Lucinda Brand (NED) |
| 27 December | Heusden-Zolder | Lucinda Brand (NED) | Baloise–Trek Lions | Lucinda Brand (NED) |
| 29 December | Diegem | Cancelled due to the COVID-19 pandemic | | |
| 12 February | Gavere | Lucinda Brand (NED) | Baloise–Trek Lions | Lucinda Brand (NED) |
