= 2016 Ladies Tour of Norway =

Race details
- Dates: 12–14 August 2016
- Stages: 3
- Winning time: 6h 54' 36"

Results
	Winner	Lucinda Brand (NED)
	Second	Thalita de Jong (NED)
	Third	Anouska Koster (NED)
	Points	Anouska Koster (NED)
	Mountains	Cecilie Uttrup Ludwig (DEN)
	Youth	Thalita de Jong (NED)
	Team	Rabobank-Liv Woman Cycling Team

The 2016 Ladies Tour of Norway was the third edition of the Ladies Tour of Norway, a women's cycling stage race in Norway. It was rated by the UCI as a category 2.1 race. It was won by Lucinda Brand of Rabobank-Liv Woman Cycling Team.

== Teams ==
Eighteen teams participated in the race. Each team had a maximum of six riders:

Professional women's teams

- Rabobank-Liv Woman Cycling Team
- Cervélo–Bigla Pro Cycling
- Cylance Pro Cycling
- Team Hitec Products
- Team BMS BIRN
- Podium Ambition Pro Cycling
- Drops
- Lensworld–Zannata

National teams

- Norway
- Sweden
- Finland

Regional and club teams

- CK Victoria
- Bryne CK
- Region Sor
- Region Ost

Women's amateur teams

- Swaboladies.nl
- Maxx-Solar
- Crescent D.A.R.E

== Route ==
Stage characteristics and winners
Stage	Date	Course	Distance	Type	Stage winner
1	12 August	Halden to Fredrikstad	76.1 km (47.3 mi)	Flat stage	Nicole Hanselmann (SUI)
2	13 August	Mysen to Sarpsborg	97 km (60 mi)	Hilly stage	Lucinda Brand (NED)
3	14 August	Svinesund to Halden	117.5 km (73.0 mi)	Hilly stage	Anouska Koster (NED)

== Stages ==
=== Stage 1 ===
12 August 2016 – Halden to Fredrikstad, 71.1 km (44.2 mi)

Stage 1 result

Rank	Rider	Team	Time
1	Nicole Hanselmann (SUI)	Cervélo–Bigla Pro Cycling	1h 43' 17"
2	Thalita de Jong (NED)	Rabobank-Liv Woman Cycling Team	+ 9"
3	Lucinda Brand (NED)	Rabobank-Liv Woman Cycling Team	+ 14"
4	Susanne Andersen (NOR)	Norway	s.t.
5	Maria Giulia Confalonieri (ITA)	Lensworld–Zannata	s.t.
6	Christina Siggaard (DEN)	Team BMS BIRN	s.t.
7	Camilla Møllebro (DEN)	Team BMS BIRN	s.t.
8	Sara Mustonen (SWE)	Sweden	s.t.
9	Carmen Small (USA)	Cylance Pro Cycling	s.t.
10	Beate Zanner (GER)	Maxx-Solar	s.t.

General classification after Stage 1

Rank	Rider	Team	Time
1	Nicole Hanselmann (SUI)	Cervélo–Bigla Pro Cycling	1h 43' 06"
2	Thalita de Jong (NED)	Rabobank-Liv Woman Cycling Team	+ 14"
3	Lucinda Brand (NED)	Rabobank-Liv Woman Cycling Team	+ 21"
4	Emilie Moberg (NOR)	Team Hitec Products	+ 22"
5	Anouska Koster (NED)	Rabobank-Liv Woman Cycling Team	s.t.
6	Christina Siggaard (DEN)	Team BMS BIRN	+ 23"
7	Carmen Small (USA)	Cylance Pro Cycling	s.t.
8	Rachele Barbieri (ITA)	Cylance Pro Cycling	+ 24"
9	Susanne Andersen (NOR)	Norway	+ 25"
10	Maria Giulia Confalonieri (ITA)	Lensworld–Zannata	s.t.

=== Stage 2 ===
13 August 2016 – Mysen to Sarpsborg, 96 km (59.7 mi)

Stage 2 result

Rank	Rider	Team	Time
1	Lucinda Brand (NED)	Rabobank-Liv Woman Cycling Team	2h 25' 24"
2	Susanne Andersen (NOR)	Norway	+ 56"
3	Thalita de Jong (NED)	Rabobank-Liv Woman Cycling Team	s.t.
4	Christina Siggaard (DEN)	Team BMS BIRN	+ 57"
5	Kaat Van der Meulen (BEL)	Lensworld–Zannata	s.t.
6	Cecilie Uttrup Ludwig (DEN)	Team BMS BIRN	s.t.
7	Ida Erngren (SWE)	Crescent D.A.R.E	s.t.
8	Maria Giulia Confalonieri (ITA)	Lensworld–Zannata	s.t.
9	Camilla Møllebro (DEN)	Team BMS BIRN	s.t.
10	Anouska Koster (NED)	Rabobank-Liv Woman Cycling Team	s.t.

General classification after Stage 2

Rank	Rider	Team	Time
1	Lucinda Brand (NED)	Rabobank-Liv Woman Cycling Team	4h 08' 39"
2	Thalita de Jong (NED)	Rabobank-Liv Woman Cycling Team	+ 57"
3	Nicole Hanselmann (SUI)	Cervélo–Bigla Pro Cycling	+ 1' 00"
4	Susanne Andersen (NOR)	Norway	+ 1' 06"
5	Christina Siggaard (DEN)	Team BMS BIRN	+ 1' 07"
6	Anouska Koster (NED)	Rabobank-Liv Woman Cycling Team	s.t.
7	Carmen Small (USA)	Cylance Pro Cycling	+ 1' 10"
8	Emilie Moberg (NOR)	Team Hitec Products	s.t.
9	Maria Giulia Confalonieri (ITA)	Lensworld–Zannata	+ 1' 13"
10	Camilla Møllebro (DEN)	Team BMS BIRN	s.t.

=== Stage 3 ===
14 August 2016 – Stromstad to Halden, 101.8 km (63.3 mi)

Stage 3 result

Rank	Rider	Team	Time
1	Anouska Koster (NED)	Rabobank-Liv Woman Cycling Team	2h 45' 48"
2	Emilie Moberg (NOR)	Team Hitec Products	s.t.
3	Christina Siggaard (DEN)	Team BMS BIRN	s.t.
4	Thalita de Jong (NED)	Rabobank-Liv Woman Cycling Team	s.t.
5	Sara Mustonen (SWE)	Sweden	s.t.
6	Carmen Small (USA)	Cylance Pro Cycling	+ 4"
7	Lucinda Brand (NED)	Rabobank-Liv Woman Cycling Team	+ 9"
8	Maria Giulia Confalonieri (ITA)	Lensworld–Zannata	+ 26"
9	Jeanne Korevaar (NED)	Rabobank-Liv Woman Cycling Team	+ 30"
10	Alexandra Nessmar (SWE)	Sweden	s.t.

General classification after Stage 3

Rank	Rider	Team	Time
1	Lucinda Brand (NED)	Rabobank-Liv Woman Cycling Team	6h 54' 36"
2	Thalita de Jong (NED)	Rabobank-Liv Woman Cycling Team	+ 45"
3	Anouska Koster (NED)	Rabobank-Liv Woman Cycling Team	s.t.
4	Christina Siggaard (DEN)	Team BMS BIRN	+ 52"
5	Emilie Moberg (NOR)	Team Hitec Products	+ 55"
6	Carmen Small (USA)	Cylance Pro Cycling	+ 1' 04"
7	Sara Mustonen (SWE)	Sweden	s.t.
8	Nicole Hanselmann (SUI)	Cervélo–Bigla Pro Cycling	+ 1' 21"
9	Susanne Andersen (NOR)	Norway	+ 1' 27"
10	Maria Giulia Confalonieri (ITA)	Lensworld–Zannata	+ 1' 30"

== Classification leadership ==
Stage	Winner	General classification	Points classification	Mountains classification	Young rider classification	Team classification
1	Nicole Hanselmann	Nicole Hanselmann	Nicole Hanselmann	Cecilie Uttrup Ludwig	Thalita de Jong	Cervélo–Bigla Pro Cycling
2	Lucinda Brand	Lucinda Brand	Lucinda Brand	Cecilie Uttrup Ludwig	Thalita de Jong	Rabobank-Liv Woman Cycling Team
3	Anouska Koster	Lucinda Brand	Anouska Koster	Cecilie Uttrup Ludwig	Thalita de Jong	Rabobank-Liv Woman Cycling Team
Final		Lucinda Brand	Anouska Koster	Cecilie Uttrup Ludwig	Thalita de Jong	Rabobank-Liv Woman Cycling Team

== See also ==
- 2016 in women's road cycling
