= Maria Giulia Confalonieri =

Italian cyclist

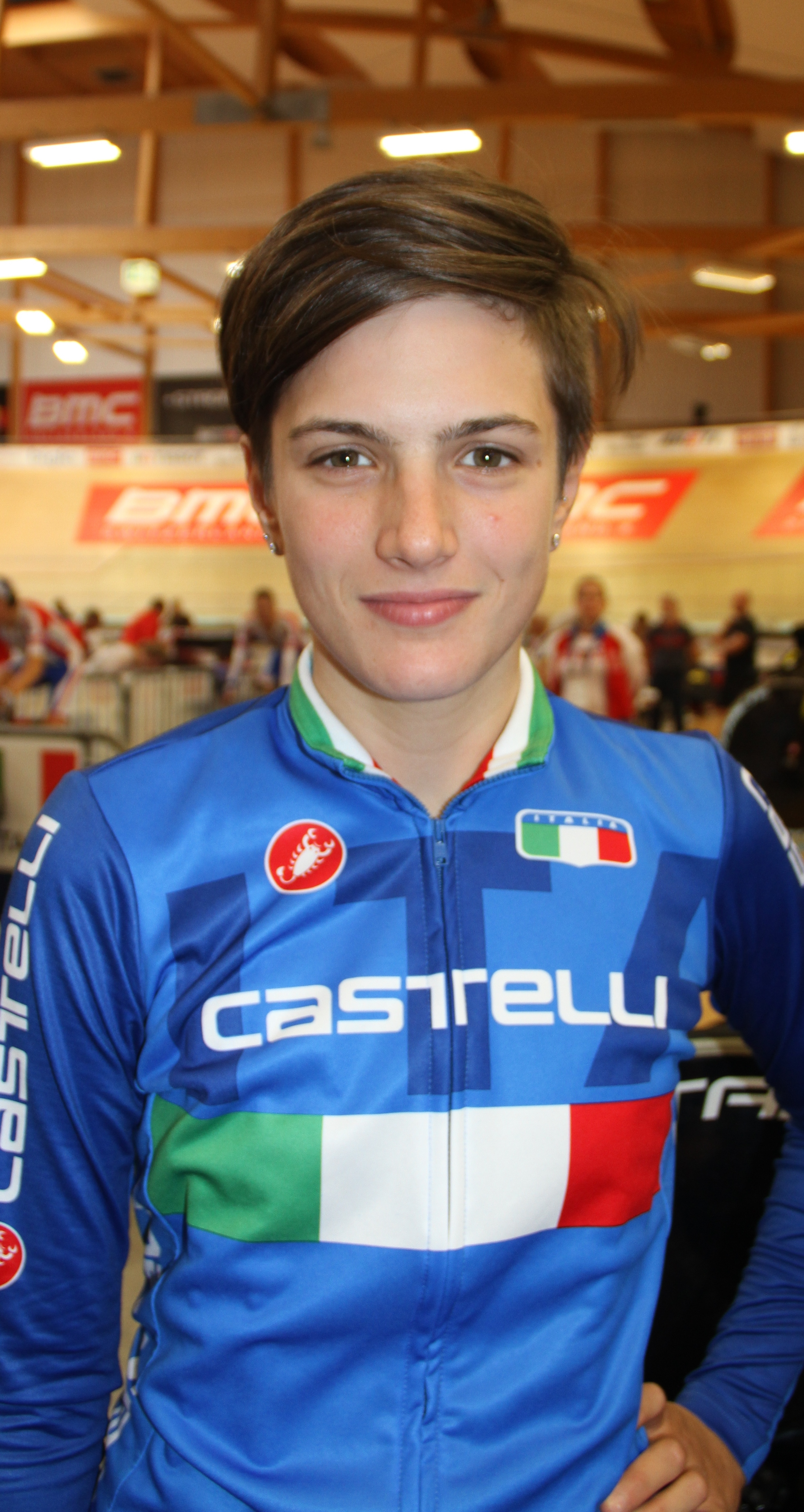
- Confalonieri at the 2015 UEC European Track Championships

Personal information
- Full name: Maria Giulia Confalonieri
- Born: 30 March 1993 (age 33) Giussano, Lombardy, Italy
- Height: 168 cm (5 ft 6 in)

Cycling career
- Sport: Cycling
- Current team: Uno-X Mobility
- Disciplines: Road; Track
- Role: Rider

Amateur team
- Fiamme Oro

Professional teams
- 2012–2014: Faren–Honda Team
- 2015: Alé–Cipollini
- 2016–2017: Lensworld–Zannata
- 2018–2019: Valcar–PBM
- 2020–2022: Ceratizit–WNT Pro Cycling
- 2023–: Uno-X Mobility
Medal record
Women's track cycling
Representing Italy
World Championships
Bronze medal – third place	2018 Apeldoorn	Madison
European Championships
Gold medal – first place	2018 Glasgow	Points race
Gold medal – first place	2019 Apeldoorn	Points race
Bronze medal – third place	2014 Baie-Mahault	Team pursuit
Bronze medal – third place	2017 Berlin	Elimination race

Maria Giulia Confalonieri (born 30 March 1993) is an Italian track and road racing cyclist, who currently rides for UCI Women's World Tour Team Uno-X Pro Cycling. She previously rode for UCI Women's Continental Team Ceratizit Pro Cycling.

As a Junior rider on the track, she won the points race at the 2011 UCI Junior Track World Championships. At under-23 level, Confalonieri won the scratch race at the 2013 UEC European Track Championships. On the road she competed at the 2013 UCI Road World Championships in the women's team time trial.

== Major results ==
=== Track ===
2012
UEC European Under-23 Championships

3rd Points race
3rd Team pursuit

2013
UEC European Under-23 Championships

1st Scratch
3rd Points race
3rd Team pursuit

1st Points race, 6 giorni delle rose – Fiorenzuola (Under-23)
2nd Scratch, Copa Internacional de Pista
2nd Scratch, 3 Jours d'Aigle
3rd Omnium, UIV Talents Cup Final (Under-23)
2014
1st Points race, International Track Women & Men (Under-23)
UEC European Under-23 Championships

2nd Points race
3rd Team pursuit

2015
2nd Points race, 3 Jours d'Aigle
2016
3 Jours d'Aigle

1st Scratch
3rd Points race

3rd Omnium, Prova Internacional de Anadia
2017
Track Cycling Challenge

1st Omnium
2nd Madison (with Letizia Paternoster)

3rd Elimination, UEC European Championships
3rd Madison, UCI World Cup, Pruszków (with Elisa Balsamo)
9th Overall Six Day London
2018
UCI World Cup, Minsk

1st Madison (with Letizia Paternoster)
2nd Points race

=== Road ===
2012
3rd GP Liberazione
2014
3rd Road race, National Championships
8th Dwars door de Westhoek
9th Overall Auensteiner-Radsporttage
10th Drentse 8 van Dwingeloo
2015
5th Overall Giro della Toscana

1st Young rider classification

6th Dwars door de Westhoek
7th Time trial, UEC European Under-23 Championships
9th Winston-Salem Cycling Classic
9th Philadelphia Cycling Classic
10th Overall The Women's Tour
2016
4th Overall BeNe Ladies Tour
5th RideLondon Grand Prix
5th Crescent Vårgårda UCI Women's WorldTour
5th Madrid Challenge by La Vuelta
7th Pajot Hills Classic
9th Gran Premio Bruno Beghelli
10th Overall Tour of Norway
10th La Course by Le Tour de France
10th Dwars door de Westhoek
2017
2nd Trofee Maarten Wynants
3rd Gooik–Geraardsbergen–Gooik
3rd Dwars door de Westhoek
5th Gran Premio Bruno Beghelli
6th Overall Giro della Toscana
6th Gent–Wevelgem
8th Overall Grand Prix Elsy Jacobs
9th Road race, UEC European Championships
9th Crescent Vårgårda Road Race
2018
2nd Overall Giro della Toscana

1st Points classification

2nd Gran Premio della Liberazione
3rd Omloop Het Nieuwsblad
4th Omloop van het Hageland
4th Dwars door de Westhoek
5th Brabantse Pijl
5th Trofee Maarten Wynants
6th Three Days of Bruges–De Panne
7th Acht van Westerveld
7th Gooik–Geraardsbergen–Gooik
7th Crescent Vårgårda
10th Road race, Mediterranean Games
2019
7th Overall Grand Prix Elsy Jacobs
7th SwissEver GP Cham-Hagendorn
Postnord UCI WWT Vårgårda West Sweden

7th Road race
7th Team time trial

9th Prudential RideLondon Classique
9th Gran Premio Bruno Beghelli
2020
3rd Clasica Femenina Navarra
7th Brabantse Pijl
8th GP de Plouay
2021
3rd Overall Festival Elsy Jacobs
5th Diamond Tour
6th GP Oetingen8
6th Grand Prix International d'Isbergues
7th Nokere Koerse
2022
1st Overall AG Tour de la Semois
3rd Gent–Wevelgem
3rd GP Oetingen
3rd Gran Premio della Liberazione
3rd Grand Prix International d'Isbergues
5th Kreiz Breizh Elites
8th Omloop Het Nieuwsblad
8th Drentse Acht van Westerveld
9th Grand Prix du Morbihan Féminin
2023
2nd Le Samyn
5th Ronde van Drenthe
2025
6th Paris–Roubaix
8th Dwars door Vlaanderen
