= 2012 UCI Road World Championships – Women's junior road race =

Women's junior road race
2012 UCI Road World Championships

Race details
- Dates: 21 September 2012
- Stages: 1

The Women's junior road race of the 2012 UCI Road World Championships was a cycling event that took place on 21 September 2012 in Limburg, the Netherlands.

During the race Eva Mottet heavily crashed. She got medical help, and her father was with her as he was an UCI-official at the race. She suffered major injuries to her nose, and would never fully recover.

== Final classification (top 10) ==
	Cyclist	Nation		Time
1	Lucy Garner	Great Britain	in	2h 11' 26"
2	Eline Brustad	Norway	+	s.t.
3	Anna Stricker	Italy		s.t.
4	Sophie Williamson	New Zealand		s.t.
5	Jessy Druyts	Belgium		s.t.
6	Rasa Pocytė	Lithuania		s.t.
7	Sheyla Gutiérrez	Spain		s.t.
8	Cecilie Uttrup Ludwig	Denmark		s.t.
9	Emily Roper	Australia		s.t.
10	Alicja Ratajczak	Poland		s.t.
