= 2015 Dwars door de Westhoek =

Race details
- Dates: 26 April 2015
- Distance: 135 km (84 mi)
- Winning time: 3h 29' 38"

Results
	Winner	Élise Delzenne (FRA)	(Velocio–SRAM)
	Second	Jolien D'Hoore (BEL)	(Wiggle–Honda)
	Third	Tiffany Cromwell (AUS)	(Velocio–SRAM)

The 2015 Dwars door de Westhoek was held on 26 April 2015, in Boezinge, Belgium. Élise Delzenne (Velocio–SRAM) won, beating Jolien D'Hoore (Wiggle–Honda) and Tiffany Cromwell (Velocio–SRAM).

== Results ==
Result
Rank	Rider	Team	Time
1	Élise Delzenne (FRA)	Velocio–SRAM	3h 29' 38"
2	Jolien D'Hoore (BEL)	Wiggle–Honda	+ 30"
3	Tiffany Cromwell (AUS)	Velocio–SRAM	+ 30"
4	Kirsten Wild (NED)	Team Hitec Products	+ 30"
5	Elena Cecchini (ITA)	Lotto–Soudal Ladies	+ 30"
6	Maria Giulia Confalonieri (ITA)	Alé–Cipollini	+ 30"
7	Shelley Olds (USA)	Bigla Pro Cycling Team	+ 30"
8	Christine Majerus (LUX)	Boels–Dolmans	+ 30"
9	Lucy Garner (GBR)	Team Liv–Plantur	+ 30"
10	Emma Johansson (SWE)	Orica–AIS	+ 30"
