= 2011 UCI Road World Championships – Women's junior road race =

Women's junior road race
2011 UCI Road World Championships

Race details
- Dates: 23 September 2011
- Stages: 1
- Distance: 70 km (43.50 mi)

The Women's junior road race of the 2011 UCI Road World Championships was a cycling event that took place on 23 September 2011 in Copenhagen, Denmark.

== Final classification ==
	Cyclist	Nation		Time
1st place, gold medalist(s)	Lucy Garner	Great Britain	in	1 h 46 min 17 s
2nd place, silver medalist(s)	Jessy Druyts	Belgium	+	0 s
3rd place, bronze medalist(s)	Christina Siggaard	Denmark		0 s
4	Manon Souyris	France		0 s
5	Christina Perchtold	Austria		0 s
6	Sheyla Gutiérrez Ruiz	Spain		0 s
7	Lisa Küllmer	Germany		0 s
8	Beatrice Bartelloni	Italy		0 s
9	Kelly Markus	Netherlands		0 s
10	Silvija Latozaite	Lithuania		0 s
