= Leicestershire Road Club =

Cycling club in England

The Leicestershire Road Club is a cycling club in Leicester, England. The club has produced European and world champions.

== Formation and early history ==
The Leicestershire Road Club is the oldest cycling club in Leicestershire. It was formed from the remnants of the Syston and Belgrave Clubs of Leicester.

According to the Club's records, it was formed following a meeting of twelve cyclists held on 19 February 1909 at the Bell Hotel, 26 Humberstone Gate, Leicester. The original name was 'The Leicestershire Road Clubs and Records Association'. This was modified to Leicestershire Road Club two weeks later. The first chairman was Mr H.E. Winks. At a general meeting on 16 April 1909, Mr Hales was nominated to be the first president, but never took office. Mr H.E. Winks became president at the first annual general meeting the following year.

== World and European champions ==
Ex-member Colin Sturgess, who has been inducted into the British Cycling 'Hall of Fame', became the 1989 world professional pursuit champion, over 5,000 m. Colin also came 4th in the 1988 Seoul Olympics Pursuit, over 4,000 m.

Club members Lucy Garner and Dan McLay are both junior world champions. On 15 August 2010, McLay became Junior World Madison track champion. Then, on 23 September 2011, Garner became junior world women's road race champion.

In July 2012, Garner won three European titles, in the Junior Women's scratch race, in the Junior Women's road race, and as part of the Junior Women's pursuit team (with Elinor Barker and Amy Roberts). In September 2012, Lucy Garner retained her World Junior Women's Road race title.

== Colours ==
The club jersey is yellow, with red and blue sleeves.

== Roll of honour ==
National championships – Men

- 1958 Owen Blower 1st British best all-rounder
- 1964 R Smith 2nd junior 25 mile time trial
- 1967 K Colyer, P Jones, C Wilson 1st junior 25 mile time trial – team
- 1968 Mick Ward, Paul Bowler, C Wilson 1st 12 hours time trial – team
- 1968 Mick Ward 3rd 24 hours time trial
- 1968 Mick Ward, Eric Tremaine, Eddy Cotterill 1st 24 hours time trial – team
- 1989 M Dawes 1st Peter Buckley junior RR Trophy
- 1989 M Dawes 2nd junior road race
- 1989 M Dawes 3rd junior 3000m pursuit
- 1990 Phil Rayner, Martin Webster, Martin Ludlam, Colin Griffiths 3rd team 4000m pursuit
- 1991 Darryl Webster 3rd 50 km individual points
- 2008 Daniel McLay 1st junior men’s scratch race (track)

National championships – ladies

- 1957 Roma Clarke 1st ladies 100 mile time trial
- 1989 Sally Dawes 3rd ladies 3000m pursuit
- 1989 Sally Dawes 1st ladies 3000m pursuit
- 1989 Sally Dawes 1st ladies individual points
- 1989 Sally Dawes 3rd ladies kilometre time trial
- 1989 Sally Dawes 1st ladies 3000m pursuit
- 1989 Sally Dawes 1st junior ladies 25 mile time trial
- 1989 Sally Dawes 3rd ladies points race
- 1990 Sally Dawes 1st ladies 3000m pursuit
- 1990 Sally Dawes 1st ladies points champion 30 km
- 1991 Sally Dawes 1st ladies 3000m pursuit
- 1992 Sally Dawes 1st ladies 3000m pursuit
- 1992 Sally Dawes 1st ladies kilometre time trial
- 1992 Sally Dawes 2nd ladies points race

British Schools Cycling Association (BSCA)

Daniel Mclay under-12 boy

- 2003/04 national mountain bike champion
- 2003/04 national cyclo-cross champion
- 2003/04 national roller racing champion – 500m standing start time 24.72 – national record
- 2003/04 national time trial champion – 1 km time 53.82
- 2003/04 national time trial champion – time 13.54
- 2003/04 national grass track champion

Daniel Mclay under-14 boy

- 2004/05 national roller racing champion

Lucy Garner under-10 girl

- 2004/05 national cyclo-cross champion
- 2004/05 national roller racing champion
- 2004/05 national time trial champion – time 10.52
- 2004/05 national hard track champion
- 2004/05 national grass track champion
- 2004/05 national circuit race champion

Lucy Garner under-12 girl

- 2005/06 national cyclo-cross champion
- 2005/06 national roller racing champion
- 2005/06 national mountain bike champion
- 2005/06 national circuit race champion
- 2006/07 national cyclo-cross champion
- 2006/07 national roller racing champion
- 2006/07 national circuit race champion
- 2006/07 national time trial champion
- 2006/07 national hard track champion
- 2006/07 national track Omnium champion

Lucy Garner under-14 girl

- 2007/08 national roller racing champion – 500m standing start time 22.68 – national record
- 2007/08 national roller racing champion – 1 km time 47.62 – national record
- 2007/08 national circuit race champion
- 2007/08 national circuit race Series champion
- 2007/08 track Omnium national champion
- 2007/08 Girls Cyclocross national champion
- 2007/08 pursuit national champion

Lucy Garner under-16 girl

- 2008 pursuit national champion
- 2009 national circuit race Series champion
- 2009 Cyclocross national champion
- 2009 Cyclocross national Series champion
- 2010 circuit race national champion
- 2010 Girls national circuit race Series champion

Grace Garner under-10 girl

- 2005/06 national roller racing champion
- 2005/06 national mountain bike champion
- 2005/06 national circuit race champion
- 2006/07 national roller racing champion

Grace Garner under-12 girl

- 2007/08 national roller racing champion – 500m standing start time 25.46 – national record
- 2007/08 national roller racing champion – 1 km time 53.07 – national record
- 2008 national circuit race champion
- 2009 national circuit race champion
- 2009 track Omnium national champion

Grace Garner under-14 girl

- 2010 track Omnium national champion
- 2010 national circuit race Series champion

Charlotte Broughton under-8 girl

- 2004/05 national time trial champion – time 11.18
- 2004/05 national grass track champion
- 2004/05 national circuit race champion
- 2005/06 national cyclo-cross champion
- 2005/06 national roller racing champion
- 2005/06 national mountain bike champion
- 2005/06 national hard track champion
- 2005/06 national grass track champion
- 2005/06 national circuit race champion

Kimberley North under-14 girl

- 2004/05 national time trial champion – time 34.44

Kimberley North under-16 girl

- 2005/06 national time trial champion – time 32.36

Competition records

- 1952 D Lewin, O Blower, G Smith team – 50 miles time trial 6h 10m 35s
- 1958 O Blower 12 Hour time trial 271.809 mls
- 1958 O Blower, D Bowman, T Jobson team – 12 Hour time trial 772.701 mls
- 1969 E Tremaine tricycle 100 mile TT 4h 31m 20s
- 1971 E Tremaine tricycle 100 mile TT 4h 30m 48s
- 1972 E Tremaine tricycle 100 mile TT 4h 27m 51s
- 1972 E Tremaine & D Gabbot (Clayton Velo) tandem tricycle 50 miles TT 1h 55m 28s
- 1972 E Tremaine tricycle 24 Hour TT 457.895 mls
- 1992 S Dawes ladies 3000m track TT 3m 53.292s

road records Association

- 1982 E Tremaine Lands End to John O’Groats, tricycle 2 days 6 hours 18 minutes 35 seconds

Veterans national age records

- 1997 OG Blower 25 miles 65-70 yrs 54m 7s

World championship performances

- 1989 S Dawes 2nd junior ladies Points race – Moscow
- 1991 S Dawes 2nd junior ladies road race – Colorado

Honours

- 1972 E Tremaine FT Bidlake Memorial Plaque
- 1989 S Dawes Ernie Chambers Trophy (best international junior)
- 1990 S Dawes Ernie Chambers Trophy
- 1991 S Dawes Merkens Bowl for domestic track performances
- 1992 S Dawes Ernie Chambers Trophy
- 1999 AJ Summers BCF Gold Badge of Honour

Other Notable Results

- 2016 R Swinner Race Winner Overst League
