= 2018 Omloop Het Nieuwsblad (women's race) =

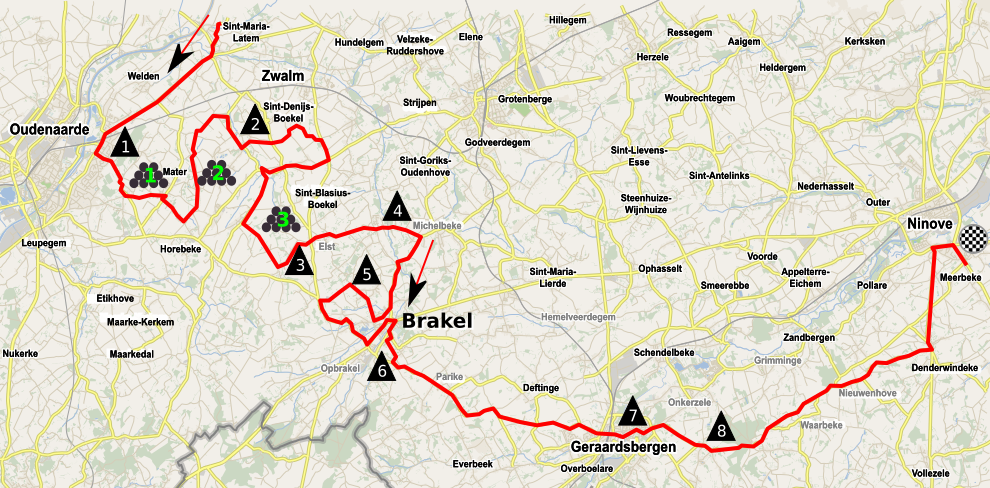
- Final 90 km of the race

Race details
- Dates: 24 February 2018
- Distance: 122 km (76 mi)
- Winning time: 3h 35' 20"

Results
	Winner	Christina Siggaard (DEN)	(Team Virtu Cycling)
	Second	Alexis Ryan (USA)	(Canyon//SRAM)
	Third	Maria Giulia Confalonieri (ITA)	(Valcar–PBM)

The 2018 Omloop Het Nieuwsblad was the 13th edition of the women's Omloop Het Nieuwsblad road cycling one-day race which was held on 24 February. The race was a 1.1 event of the women's international calendar. The race started in Ghent and, for the first time, finished in Ninove. The total distance was 122.1 km (75.9 mi), covering eight classified climbs in the Flemish Ardennes.

Danish rider Christina Siggaard claimed a surprise win in the sprint of a 25-strong group. American Alexis Ryan finished second, and Italian Maria Giulia Confalonieri third.

== Teams ==
Twenty-four teams participated in the race. Each team had a maximum of six riders:

Professional women's teams

- Team Sunweb
- Boels–Dolmans
- Mitchelton–Scott
- Doltcini–Van Eyck Sport
- Experza–Footlogix
- Lotto–Soudal Ladies
- Alé–Cipollini
- Canyon//SRAM
- Cylance Pro Cycling
- FDJ Nouvelle-Aquitaine Futuroscope
- Health Mate–Cyclelive Team
- Hitec Products–Birk Sport
- Parkhotel Valkenburg
- Valcar–PBM
- WaowDeals Pro Cycling
- Wiggle High5
- BTC City Ljubljana
- Team Virtu Cycling

Women's amateur cycling teams

- Isorex
- Jos Feron Lady Force
- Keukens Redant
- Autoglas Wetteren
- Equano–Wase Zon
- Wielerclub de sprinters Malderen

== Results ==
Final general classification
Rank	Rider	Team	Time
1	Christina Siggaard (DEN)	Team Virtu Cycling	3h 35' 20"
2	Alexis Ryan (USA)	Canyon//SRAM	+ 0"
3	Maria Giulia Confalonieri (ITA)	Valcar–PBM	+ 0"
4	Chloe Hosking (AUS)	Alé–Cipollini	+ 0"
5	Coryn Rivera (USA)	Team Sunweb	+ 0"
6	Nina Kessler (NED)	Hitec Products–Birk Sport	+ 0"
7	Jeanne Korevaar (NED)	WaowDeals Pro Cycling	+ 0"
8	Jolien D'Hoore (BEL)	Mitchelton–Scott	+ 0"
9	Marta Cavalli (ITA)	Valcar–PBM	+ 0"
10	Audrey Cordon-Ragot (FRA)	Wiggle High5	+ 0"

== See also ==
- 2018 in women's road cycling
