= 2020–21 Cyclo-cross Superprestige =

Cyclo-cross competition held in Belgium and the Netherlands

Details
- Location: Belgium & Netherlands
- Races: 8

Champions
- Male individual champion: Toon Aerts (BEL) (Pauwels Sauzen–Bingoal)
- Female individual champion: Lucinda Brand (NED) (Telenet–Baloise Lions)

The 2020–21 Cyclo-cross Superprestige – also known as the Telenet Superprestige for sponsorship reasons – is a season-long cyclo-cross competition held in Belgium and the Netherlands.

== Calendar ==
=== Men's competition ===
Date	Race	Winner	Team	Competition leader
11 October	Gieten	Toon Aerts (BEL)	Telenet–Baloise Lions	Toon Aerts (BEL)
24 October	Ruddervoorde	Eli Iserbyt (BEL)	Pauwels Sauzen–Bingoal	Eli Iserbyt (BEL)
11 November	Niel	Laurens Sweeck (BEL)	Pauwels Sauzen–Bingoal	Eli Iserbyt (BEL)
22 November	Merksplas	Michael Vanthourenhout (BEL)	Pauwels Sauzen–Bingoal	Eli Iserbyt (BEL)
6 December	Boom	Eli Iserbyt (BEL)	Pauwels Sauzen–Bingoal	Eli Iserbyt (BEL)
13 December	Gavere	Tom Pidcock (GBR)	Trinity Racing	Eli Iserbyt (BEL)
26 December	Heusden-Zolder	Mathieu van der Poel (NED)	Alpecin–Fenix	Toon Aerts (BEL)
6 February	Middelkerke	Laurens Sweeck (BEL)	Pauwels Sauzen–Bingoal	Toon Aerts (BEL)

=== Women's competition ===
Date	Race	Winner	Team	Competition leader
11 October	Gieten	Ceylin del Carmen Alvarado (NED)	Alpecin–Fenix	Ceylin del Carmen Alvarado (NED)
24 October	Ruddervoorde	Ceylin del Carmen Alvarado (NED)	Alpecin–Fenix	Ceylin del Carmen Alvarado (NED)
11 November	Niel	Lucinda Brand (NED)	Telenet–Baloise Lions	Ceylin del Carmen Alvarado (NED)
22 November	Merksplas	Lucinda Brand (NED)	Telenet–Baloise Lions	Ceylin del Carmen Alvarado (NED)
6 December	Boom	Lucinda Brand (NED)	Telenet–Baloise Lions	Lucinda Brand (NED)
13 December	Gavere	Lucinda Brand (NED)	Telenet–Baloise Lions	Lucinda Brand (NED)
26 December	Heusden-Zolder	Lucinda Brand (NED)	Telenet–Baloise Lions	Lucinda Brand (NED)
6 February	Middelkerke	Denise Betsema (NED)	Pauwels Sauzen–Bingoal	Lucinda Brand (NED)
