= Christina Siggaard =

Danish cyclist (born 1994)

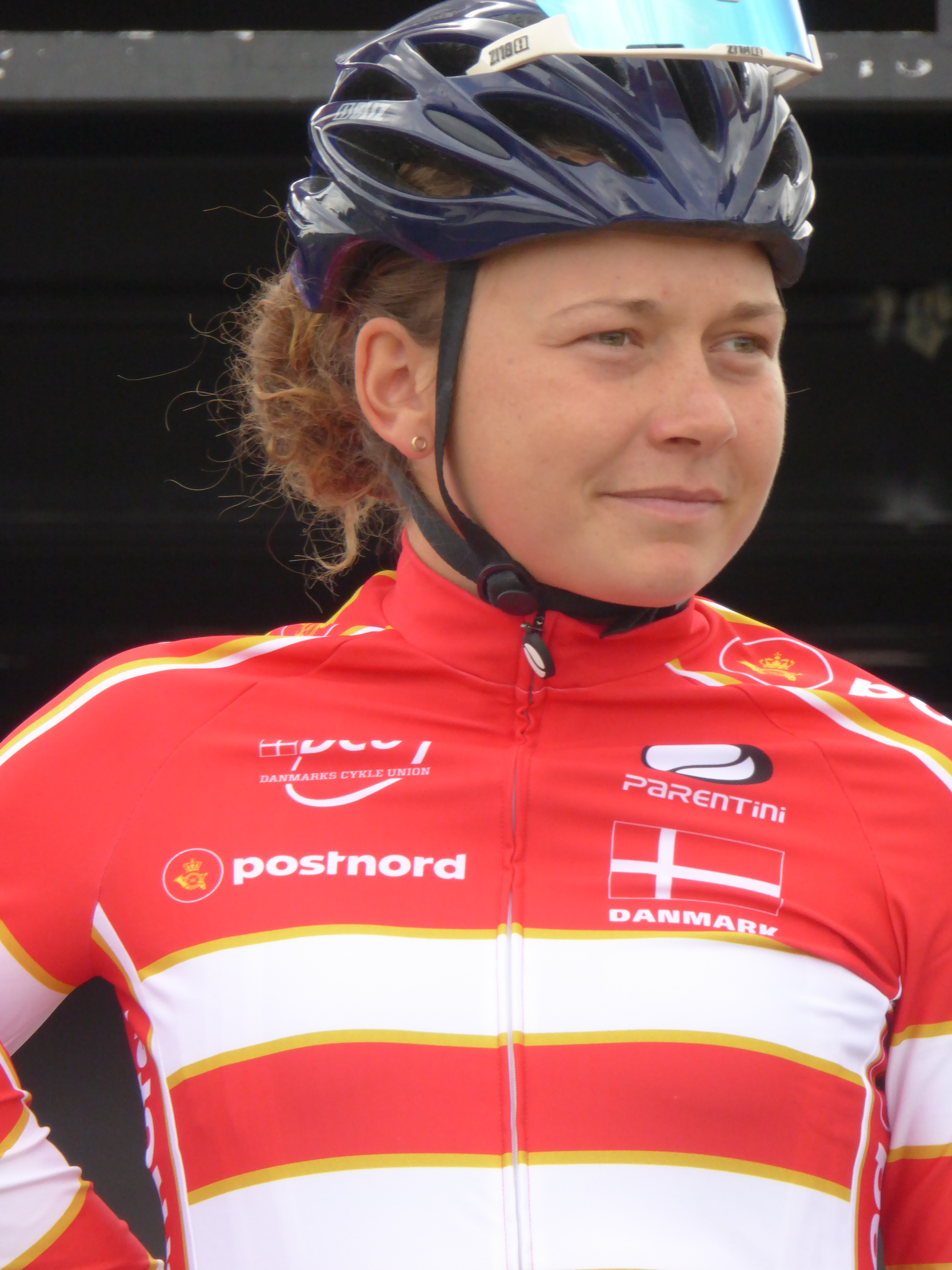
- Siggaard at the 2018 European Road Cycling Championships.

Personal information
- Full name: Christina Malling Siggaard
- Born: 24 March 1994 (age 32) Old Rye, Denmark
- Height: 178 cm (5 ft 10 in)
- Weight: 67 kg (148 lb)

Cycling career
- Sport: Cycling
- Current team: Retired
- Discipline: Road
- Role: Rider
- Rider type: All-rounder

Professional teams
- 2014: Firefighters Upsala CK
- 2015: Matrix Fitness Pro Cycling
- 2016–2019: Team BMS BIRN
- 2020–2021: Lotto–Soudal Ladies

Christina Malling Siggaard (born 24 March 1994) is a Danish former professional racing cyclist, who rode professionally between 2014 and 2021 for the Firefighters Upsala CK, Matrix Fitness Pro Cycling, Team Virtu Cycling and Lotto–Soudal Ladies teams. Siggaard represented Denmark at the 2015 European Games in the women's road race, and also represented Denmark at the UCI Road World Championships and the European Road Championships.

She now works as a commentator and analyst for Danish broadcaster TV 2 Sport's cycling coverage.

== Major results ==
2010
National Road Championships

2nd Road race
3rd Junior time trial

2011
3rd Road race, UCI Junior Road World Championships
3rd Time trial, National Junior Road Championships
2012
7th Time trial, UCI Junior Road World Championships
2014
2nd Road race, National Road Championships
2015
3rd Road race, National Road Championships
2016
4th Overall Ladies Tour of Norway
7th Grand Prix de Dottignies
2017
5th Overall Tour of Chongming Island
5th Pajot Hills Classic
10th Le Samyn des Dames
2018
1st Omloop Het Nieuwsblad
3rd Road race, National Road Championships
6th Road race, UEC European Road Championships
8th Omloop van het Hageland
10th Three Days of Bruges–De Panne
2019
1st Stage 1 BeNe Ladies Tour
3rd Road race, National Road Championships
9th Omloop Het Nieuwsblad
9th Omloop van het Hageland

== See also ==
- List of 2015 UCI Women's Teams and riders
