= Lucy van der Haar =

British cyclist

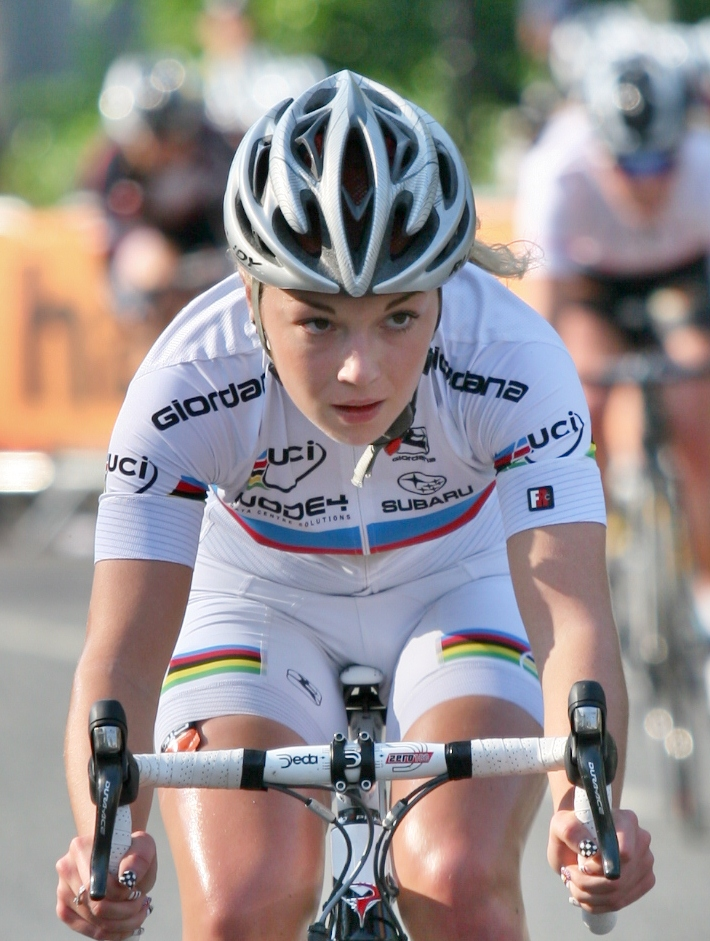
- Garner racing in the Oxford round of the 2012 Tour Series

Personal information
- Full name: Lucy May van der Haar
- Born: Lucy May Garner; 20 September 1994 (age 32) Leicester, England
- Height: 1.60 m (5 ft 3 in)

Cycling career
- Sport: Cycling
- Current team: Retired
- Disciplines: Road; Track
- Role: Rider
- Rider type: Sprinter

Amateur teams
- 2004–2012: Leicestershire Road Club
- 2011–2012: Motorpoint Pro–Cycling Team

Professional teams
- 2013–2015: Argos–Shimano
- 2016–2018: Wiggle High5
- 2019–2020: Hitec Products–Birk Sport

Lucy May van der Haar (née Garner; born 20 September 1994) is a British former professional racing cyclist, who rode professionally between 2013 and 2020 for the Team Liv–Plantur, Wiggle High5 and Hitec Products–Birk Sport teams. Van der Haar is a double junior world road race champion, winning in consecutive years, in 2011 and 2012.

== Career ==
=== Early life ===
Van der Haar grew up in Cosby, Leicestershire. Her first cycling club was the Leicestershire Road Club. Competing with them from 2004 to 2012, she won many National Awards from both the British Schools Cycling Association and British Cycling. She remained in full-time education until 2012, when she left Countesthorpe Community College having completed her AS-levels.

=== Amateur career ===
Van der Haar won her first junior world title at the 2011 road world championships in Copenhagen. She was part of a late six-woman breakaway from the peloton and won the race comfortably in a sprint for the line. A year later, she retained her title in a bunch sprint finish of 19 riders at the championships in Valkenburg, Netherlands, having had a lead-out from Elinor Barker.

=== Professional career ===
Van der Haar signed a professional contract with UCI Women's Team Argos–Shimano in October 2012, turning professional at the start of the 2013 season. In May 2013, she claimed her first professional victory on the opening stage of the Tour of Chongming Island in Shanghai, China. In September 2015, van der Haar announced she would be riding for Wiggle High5 in 2016.

== Personal life ==
Van der Haar has a sister, Grace Garner, who is two years younger than her. She competed professionally as a racing cyclist, before also retiring in 2020. In July 2019, she married fellow cyclist Lars van der Haar, and in March 2022, announced she was pregnant with their first child.

== Major results ==
=== Road ===
2011
1st Road race, UCI World Junior Championships
2012
1st Road race, UCI World Junior Championships
1st Road race, UEC European Junior Championships
2013
3rd Overall Tour of Chongming Island

1st Stage 1

6th Dwars door de Westhoek
8th Drentse 8
2014
2nd Drentse 8
2nd 7-Dorpenomloop Aalburg
3rd Dwars door de Westhoek
3rd Grand Prix de Dottignies
7th Overall The Women's Tour
2015
1st Stage 1 La Route de France
2nd Ronde van Gelderland
5th La Madrid Challenge by La Vuelta
6th Parel van de Veluwe
9th Dwars door de Westhoek
9th Diamond Tour
2016
2nd Tour de Yorkshire
3rd Road race, National Championships
5th Ronde van Gelderland
2017
3rd Tour of Guangxi World Challenge
3rd Omloop van de IJsseldelta
2018
1st Mountains classification, Tour of Chongming Island
2019
5th Road race, National Championships
5th Overall Tour of Chongming Island
2020
1st Overall Dubai Tour

1st Points classification
1st Stage 1

=== Track ===
2011
2nd Team pursuit, National Championships
2012
UEC European Junior Championships

1st Team pursuit
1st Scratch
2nd Team sprint (with Dannielle Khan)

National Championships

1st Individual pursuit
2nd Team pursuit
