= 2014 Dwars door de Westhoek =

Race details
- Dates: 27 April 2014
- Stages: 1
- Distance: 125.9 km (78.2 mi)
- Winning time: 3h 17' 10"

Results
	Winner	Anna van der Breggen (NED)	(Rabobank-Liv Woman Cycling Team)
	Second	Jolien D'Hoore (BEL)	(Lotto–Belisol Ladies)
	Third	Lucy Garner (GBR)	(Team Giant–Shimano)

The 2014 Dwars door de Westhoek was the 5th edition of Dwars door de Westhoek, a one-day women's cycle race, held in Belgium on 27 April. The race had a UCI rating of 1.1.

== Results ==
	Rider	Team	Time
1	Anna van der Breggen (NED)	Rabobank-Liv Woman Cycling Team	3h 17' 10"
2	Jolien D'Hoore (BEL)	Lotto–Belisol Ladies	+ 12"
3	Lucy Garner (GBR)	Team Giant–Shimano	+ 12"
4	Thalita de Jong (NED)	Rabobank-Liv Woman Cycling Team	+ 12"
5	Pauline Ferrand-Prévot (FRA)	Rabobank-Liv Woman Cycling Team	+ 12"
6	Melissa Hoskins (AUS)	Orica–AIS	+ 12"
7	Alexandra Chekina (RUS)	Russia (National team)	+ 12"
8	Maria Giulia Confalonieri (ITA)	Estado de México–Faren Kuota	+ 12"
9	Maria Giulia Confalonieri (ITA)	Estado de México–Faren Kuota	+ 12"
10	Elke Gebhardt (GER)	Bigla Cycling Team	+ 12"

== See also ==
- 2014 in women's road cycling
