= Manon Souyris =

French cyclist

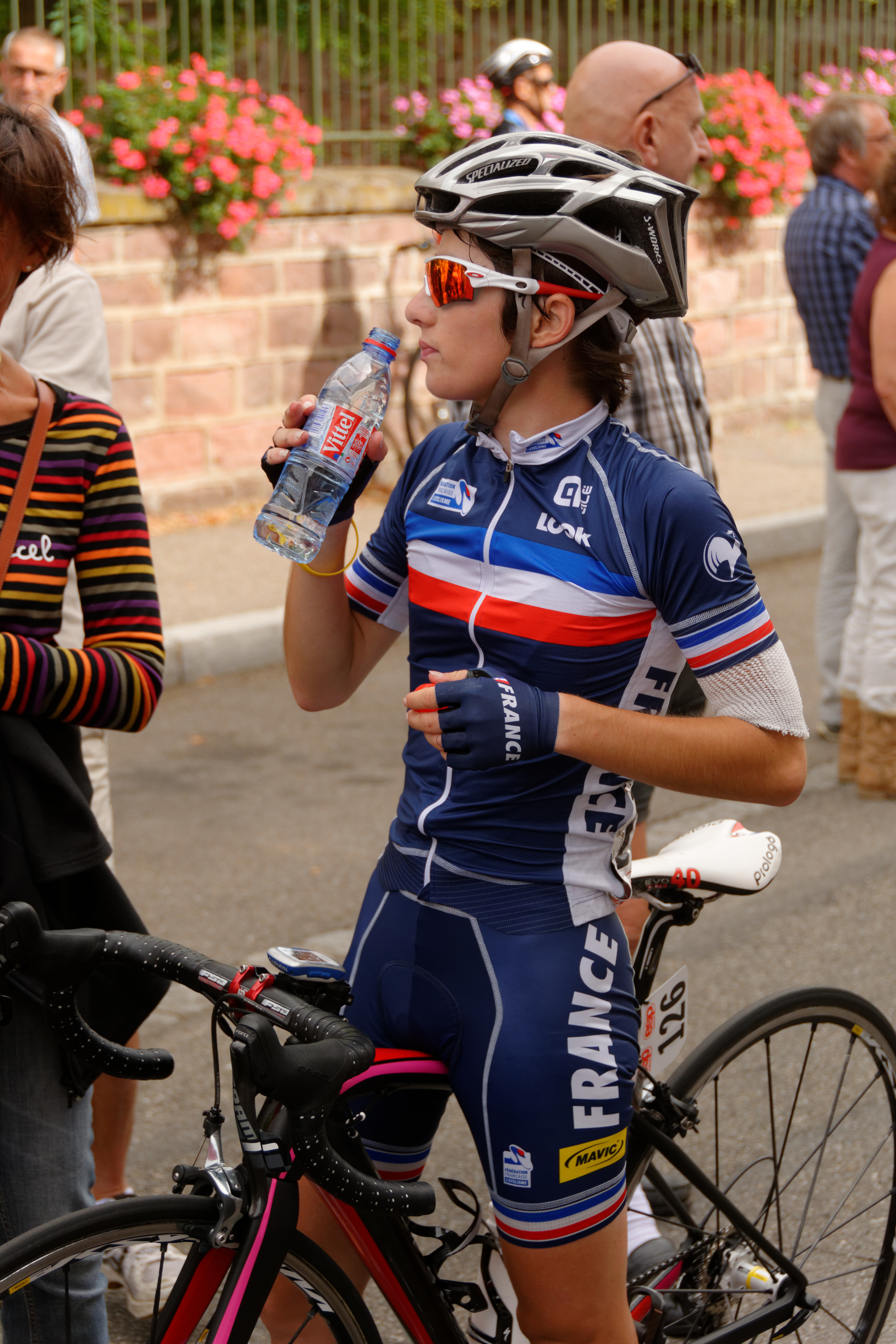

Personal information
- Born: 30 June 1993 (age 33) Albi, France
- Height: 1.58 m (5 ft 2 in)

Cycling career
- Sport: Cycling
- Current team: Mayenne Monbana My Pie
- Discipline: Road
- Role: Rider
- Rider type: Climber; Puncheur

Amateur teams
- 2015–2017: Team Féminin Languedoc-Roussillon–Le Boulou
- 2018–2019: BioFrais–VC Saint-Julien-en-Genevois

Professional teams
- 2012–2014: Vienne Futuroscope
- 2020–: Charente-Maritime Women Cycling

Manon Souyris (born 30 June 1993) is a French professional racing cyclist, who currently rides for UCI Women's Continental Team Mayenne Monbana My Pie. In October 2020, she rode in the women's edition of the 2020 Liège–Bastogne–Liège race in Belgium.

== Major results ==
2011
4th Road race, UCI Junior Road World Championships
2013
9th Cholet Pays de Loire Dames
2014
5th Grand Prix de Plumelec-Morbihan Dames
2015
6th Grand Prix de Plumelec-Morbihan Dames
2018
6th Kreiz Breizh Elites Dames
2019
7th La Périgord Ladies
9th SwissEver GP Cham-Hagendorn
2022
3rd Grand Prix Velo Alanya
