= Moniek Tenniglo =

Dutch cyclist

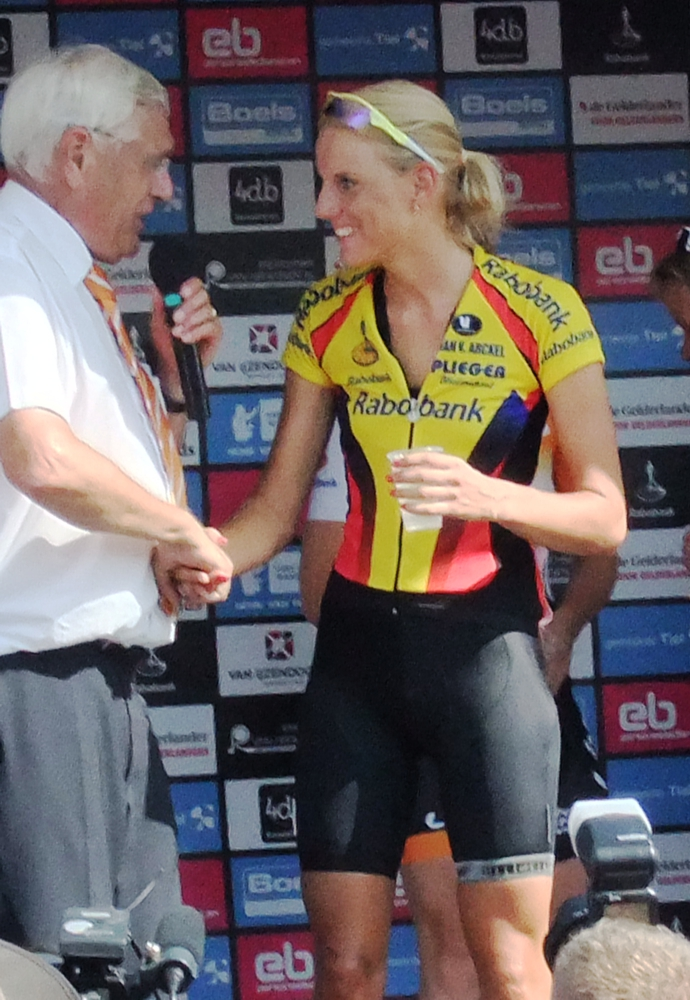
- Tenniglo in 2014

Personal information
- Full name: Moniek Tenniglo
- Born: 2 May 1988 (age 38) Albergen, Netherlands

Cycling career
- Sport: Cycling
- Discipline: Road
- Role: Rider

Amateur team
- 2010–2014: Jan van Arckel

Professional teams
- 2014–2017: Rabobank-Liv Woman Cycling Team
- 2018: FDJ Nouvelle-Aquitaine Futuroscope
- 2019–2021: Team BikeExchange

Moniek Tenniglo (born 2 May 1988) is a Dutch professional racing cyclist, who most recently rode for UCI Women's WorldTeam Team BikeExchange.

== Personal life ==
Tenniglo is currently in a relationship with fellow cyclist Marianne Vos, who disclosed their relationship when she won her first stage at the 2022's Tour de France Femmes.

== Major results ==
2015
3rd Road race, South Holland Provincial Road Championships
9th Marianne Vos Classic
10th Gent–Wevelgem
2016
1st Stage 2a (TTT) Giro del Trentino Alto Adige-Südtirol
3rd Crescent Vårgårda UCI Women's WorldTour TTT
8th Omloop van de IJsseldelta
2017
2nd 7-Dorpenomloop Aalburg
3rd Overall Gracia–Orlová
5th Overall BeNe Ladies Tour
2019
8th La Classique Morbihan
8th Clasica Femenina Navarra

== See also ==
- List of 2015 UCI Women's Teams and riders
