= Lucinda Brand =

Dutch cyclist (born 1989)

- Brand at the 2024 Tour de France Femmes

Personal information
- Full name: Lucinda Brand
- Born: 2 July 1989 (age 37) Dordrecht, Netherlands
- Height: 1.68 m (5 ft 6 in)

Cycling career
- Sport: Cycling
- Current team: Lidl–Trek (road); Baloise Verzekeringen–Het Poetsbureau Lions (cyclo-cross)
- Disciplines: Road; Cyclo-cross
- Role: Rider
- Rider type: All-rounder

Professional teams
- 2009–2012: leontien.nl
- 2013–2016: Rabobank-Liv Woman Cycling Team
- 2017–2019: Team Sunweb
- 2019–: Telenet–Fidea Lions (cyclo-cross)
- 2020–: Trek–Segafredo (road)

Major wins
- Cyclo-cross World Championships (2021, 2026) European Championships (2021, 2026) National Championships (2018, 2019, 2024) World Cup (2020–21, 2021–22, 2024–25, 2025–26) 27 individual wins (2018–19—2021–22, 2023–24, 2024–25, 2025–26) Superprestige (2020–21, 2021–22, 2024–25) Trophy (2020–21, 2021–22, 2024–25, 2025–26) Road Major Tours Giro d'Italia Mountains classification (2021) 3 individual stages (2015, 2017) Stage races Tour de Suisse (2022) One-day races and Classics National Road Race Championships (2013, 2015) Omloop Het Nieuwsblad (2017) GP de Plouay (2014)
Medal record
Representing the Netherlands
Women's road bicycle racing
World Championships
Gold medal – first place	2019 Yorkshire	Team relay
European Championships
Bronze medal – third place	2011 Offida	Under-23 road race
Bronze medal – third place	2019 Alkmaar	Time trial
Women's cyclo-cross
World Championships
Gold medal – first place	2021 Ostend	Elite
Gold medal – first place	2026 Hulst	Elite
Silver medal – second place	2019 Bogense	Elite
Silver medal – second place	2022 Fayetteville	Elite
Silver medal – second place	2024 Tabór	Elite
Silver medal – second place	2025 Liévin	Elite
Bronze medal – third place	2018 Valkenburg	Elite
Bronze medal – third place	2020 Dübendorf	Elite
Bronze medal – third place	2023 Hoogerheide	Elite
European Championships
Gold medal – first place	2021 Wijster	Elite
Gold medal – first place	2026 Zeddam	Elite
Silver medal – second place	2016 Pontchâteau	Elite
Silver medal – second place	2017 Tabor	Elite
Silver medal – second place	2025 Middelkerke	Elite
Bronze medal – third place	2020 Rosmalen	Elite
Bronze medal – third place	2024 Pontevedra	Elite

Lucinda Brand (born 2 July 1989) is a Dutch racing cyclist, who rides for UCI Women's WorldTeam Lidl–Trek in road racing, and UCI Cyclo-cross Pro Team Baloise Verzekeringen–Het Poetsbureau Lions in cyclo-cross. After four years with Rabobank-Liv Woman Cycling Team, in August 2016 Team Sunweb announced that Brand had signed a two-year deal with the team, with a role as a team leader, road captain and as part of the team's sprint train. In 2023, Brand collaborated with fellow professional cyclist Maghalie Rochette to create the cycling-focused podcast Dirty Talks.

== Major results ==
=== Road ===
2010
5th Holland Hills Classic
10th Overall Ster Zeeuwsche Eilanden
10th Omloop van Borsele
10th Grand Prix Elsy Jacobs
2011
2nd Open de Suède Vårgårda TTT
UEC European Under-23 Championships

3rd Road race
9th Time trial

7th Overall Holland Ladies Tour
9th Grand Prix Elsy Jacobs
10th Trofeo Alfredo Binda
2012
3rd Team time trial, UCI World Championships
3rd Road race, National Championships
4th Overall Tour Féminin en Limousin

1st Stage 3

4th La Flèche Wallonne
5th Overall La Route de France

1st Stage 3

6th Overall Emakumeen Euskal Bira
6th Holland Hills Classic
9th Tour of Chongming Island
9th Durango-Durango Emakumeen Saria
2013
1st Road race, National Championships
2nd Team time trial, UCI World Championships
2nd Open de Suède Vårgårda TTT
3rd Overall Trophée d'Or Féminin
3rd EPZ Omloop van Borsele
6th Overall Festival Luxembourgeois du Cyclisme Féminin Elsy Jacobs
6th GP de Plouay
7th Overall Thüringen Rundfahrt
8th Overall Emakumeen Euskal Bira
10th Holland Hills Classic
2014
1st Overall Energiewacht Tour

1st Stage 4

1st GP de Plouay
1st Stage 2 (TTT) Belgium Tour
2nd Road race, National Championships
Open de Suède Vårgårda

2nd Team time trial
9th Road race

9th Novilon EDR Cup
2015
1st Road race, National Championships
Open de Suède Vårgårda

1st Team time trial
4th Road race

Giro Rosa

1st Stages 3 & 7

2nd Overall Holland Ladies Tour

1st Points classification

2nd Sparkassen Giro
3rd Team time trial, UCI World Championships
3rd Overall Festival Luxembourgeois du cyclisme féminin Elsy Jacobs
4th Overall Energiewacht Tour

1st Stage 2b

4th Ronde van Drenthe World Cup
5th Time trial, EPZ Omloop van Borsele
8th La Course by Le Tour de France
2016
1st Overall Tour of Norway

1st Stage 2

1st Erondegemse Pijl
3rd Overall Belgium Tour

1st Stage 1

3rd Gent–Wevelgem
4th RideLondon Grand Prix
5th Omloop van het Hageland
6th Overall Energiewacht Tour
6th Omloop Het Nieuwsblad
7th Omloop van de IJsseldelta
7th Omloop van Borsele
2017
1st Team time trial, UCI World Championships
1st Omloop Het Nieuwsblad
3rd Ronde van Drenthe
4th Time trial, UEC European Championships
4th Strade Bianche
4th Dwars door Vlaanderen
6th Gooik–Geraardsbergen–Gooik
7th Overall Giro Rosa

1st Stage 8

7th Overall Healthy Ageing Tour
2018
1st Stage 1 (TTT) Madrid Challenge by La Vuelta
2nd Amstel Gold Race
2nd Postnord UCI WWT Vårgårda WestSweden TTT
3rd UCI Road World Championships – Women's team time trial
3rd Time trial, National Championships
3rd Overall Thüringen Rundfahrt
4th Overall Giro Rosa

1st Stage 1 (TTT)

6th UCI Road World Championships – Women's time trial
9th UCI Road World Championships – Women's road race
10th Overall Tour of Norway

1st (TTT)

2019
1st UCI Road World Championships – Mixed team relay
2nd Overall Madrid Challenge by la Vuelta

1st Points classification

3rd Time trial, UEC European Championships
3rd Dwars door Vlaanderen
3rd Postnord UCI WWT Vårgårda West Sweden TTT
4th Time trial, National Championships
4th Overall Holland Ladies Tour

1st Mountains classification

4th La Course by Le Tour de France
5th Liège–Bastogne–Liège
6th Overall Giro Rosa
8th UCI Road World Championships – Women's time trial
9th Tour of Flanders
2021
1st Overall Thüringen Ladies Tour

1st Stages 3 & 5

Giro Rosa

1st Mountains classification
1st Stage 1 (TTT)

3rd Time trial, National Championships
4th Gran Premio Ciudad de Eibar
9th Overall Tour of Norway
9th Liège–Bastogne–Liège
9th Brabantse Pijl
10th Overall Tour Cycliste Féminin International de l'Ardèche

1st Stage 7

2022
1st Overall Tour de Suisse

1st Points classification
1st Stages 1 & 4

Challenge by La Vuelta

1st Mountains classification
1st Stage 1 (TTT)

3rd Paris–Roubaix
8th Overall Tour of Scandinavia
2024
1st Dwars door het Hageland
9th Dwars door Vlaanderen
2026
10th Paris–Roubaix

=== Cyclo-cross ===
2016–2017
1st Woerden
2nd UEC European Championships
UCI World Cup

2nd Hoogerheide

Superprestige

2nd Gieten

2nd National Championships
2nd Mol
2nd Contern
2017–2018
1st National Championships
Soudal Classics

1st Sint-Niklaas

1st Mol
2nd UEC European Championships
Superprestige

2nd Ruddervoorde

DVV Trophy

2nd Loenhout

3rd UCI World Championships
3rd Overijse
2018–2019
1st National Championships
UCI World Cup

1st Tábor
1st Namur
1st Hoogerheide
2nd Heusden-Zolder

DVV Trophy

1st Loenhout
2nd Antwerpen

Brico Cross

1st Bredene
2nd Essen

1st Overijse
2nd UCI World Championships
3rd Woerden
2019–2020
UCI World Cup

1st Namur
1st Heusden-Zolder
1st Hoogerheide
2nd Koksijde

DVV Trophy

1st Kortrijk
2nd Baal

Rectavit Series

1st Niel

2nd Overijse
3rd UCI World Championships
3rd National Championships
2020–2021
1st UCI World Championships
1st Overall UCI World Cup

1st Tábor
1st Namur
1st Dendermonde
2nd Hulst
2nd Overijse

1st Overall Superprestige

1st Niel
1st Merksplas
1st Boom
1st Gavere
1st Heusden-Zolder
3rd Gieten
3rd Ruddervoorde
3rd Middelkerke

1st Overall X²O Badkamers Trophy

1st Kortrijk
2nd Koppenberg
2nd Antwerpen
2nd Herentals
2nd Baal
2nd Lille

Ethias Cross

1st Kruibeke
3rd Lokeren
3rd Leuven
3rd Eeklo

1st Mol
3rd UEC European Championships
2021–2022
1st UEC European Championships
1st Overall UCI World Cup

1st Fayetteville
1st Tábor
1st Besançon
1st Namur
1st Dendermonde
1st Hulst
2nd Waterloo
2nd Zonhoven
2nd Rucphen
2nd Hoogerheide
3rd Overijse
3rd Koksijde

1st Overall Superprestige

1st Gieten
1st Niel
1st Merksplas
1st Boom
1st Heusden-Zolder
1st Gavere

1st Overall X²O Badkamers Trophy

1st Kortrijk
1st Loenhout
1st Baal
1st Herentals
1st Hamme
1st Lille
2nd Brussels

1st Sint-Niklaas
2nd UCI World Championships
2nd National Championships
3rd Oostmalle
2022–2023
Exact Cross

1st Meulebeke
2nd Beringen
2nd Mol
3rd Sint-Niklaas

2nd Overall X²O Badkamers Trophy

2nd Baal
2nd Herentals
2nd Brussels
3rd Koksijde

UCI World Cup

2nd Fayetteville
2nd Gavere
3rd Waterloo

Superprestige

2nd Middelkerke
3rd Heusden-Zolder

3rd UCI World Championships
2023–2024
1st National Championships
2nd UCI World Championships
2nd Overall X²O Badkamers Trophy

1st Brussels
2nd Kortrijk
2nd Herentals
2nd Hamme

3rd Overall UCI World Cup

1st Dublin
1st Flammanville
2nd Dendermonde
2nd Antwerpen
3rd Troyes
3rd Namur
3rd Hoogerheide
4th Benidorm

Superprestige

1st Middelkerke
2nd Merksplas

Exact Cross

1st Mol
1st Sint-Niklaas

1st Oostmalle
2024–2025
1st Overall UCI World Cup

1st Dublin
1st Dendermonde
1st Hoogerheide
2nd Namur
2nd Hulst
2nd Gavere
2nd Besançon
2nd Benidorm
3rd Zonhoven
3rd Maasmechelen

1st Overall Superprestige

1st Overijse
1st Diegem
1st Gullegem
2nd Niel
2nd Mol
2nd Middelkerke

1st Overall X²O Badkamers Trophy

1st Lokeren
1st Lille
2nd Koppenberg
2nd Herentals
2nd Baal
2nd Koksijde
3rd Brussels

Exact Cross

1st Sint-Niklaas
3rd Beringen

1st Woerden
1st Oostmalle
2nd UCI World Championships
3rd UEC European Championships
2025–2026
1st UCI World Championships
1st Overall UCI World Cup

1st Tábor
1st Terralba
1st Namur
1st Antwerpen
1st Koksijde
1st Gavere
1st Dendermonde
1st Benidorm
2nd Zonhoven

1st Overall X²O Badkamers Trophy

1st Koppenberg
1st Lokeren
1st Hamme
1st Hofstade
1st Loenhout
1st Baal
2nd Lille
2nd Brussels

Superprestige

1st Niel
1st Merksplas
2nd Overijse

Exact Cross

1st Essen
1st Sint-Niklaas

1st Ardooie
2nd UEC European Championships
3rd National Championships
2026–2027
1st UEC European Championships
Superprestige

1st Overijse
1st Merksplas

X²O Trophy

1st Koppenberg
1st Hamme–Zogge

HG Cross

1st Dendermonde
2nd Lokeren

1st Ardooie

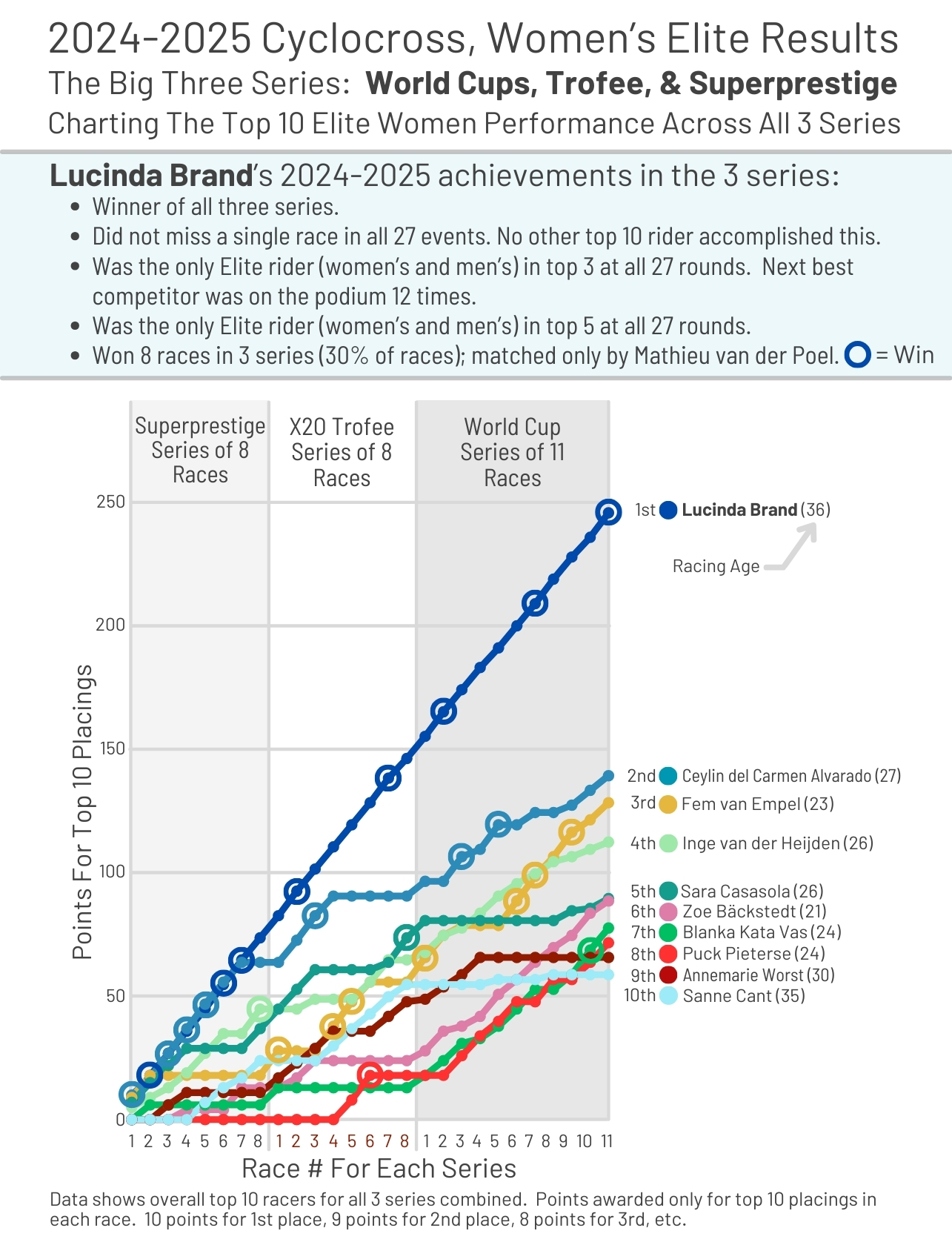
Lucinda Brand won all three primary cyclocross series in the 2024–2025 season: Superprestige, Trofee, and the World Cup.
