= 2017 BeNe Ladies Tour =

Race details
- Dates: 13–16 July 2017
- Stages: 4 + Prologue
- Distance: 349.7 km (217.3 mi)

The 2017 BeNe Ladies Tour was the fourth edition of the BeNe Ladies Tour, a women's cycling stage race in the Netherlands. It is rated by the UCI as a category 2.1 race.

== Stages ==
List of stages
Stage	Date	Course	Distance	Type	Winner
P	13 July	Vlissingen to Vlissingen	1.9 km (1.2 mi)	Prologue	Annette Edmondson (AUS)
1	14 July	Vlissingen to Philippine	127.2 km (79.0 mi)	Flat stage	Alice Barnes (GBR)
2a	15 July	Sint Laureins to Sint Laureins	98.3 km (61.1 mi)	Flat stage	Elinor Barker (GBR)
2b	15 July	Sint Laureins to Sint Laureins	10.1 km (6.3 mi)	Time Trial	Marianne Vos (NED)
3	16 July	Zelzate to Zelzate	112.2 km (69.7 mi)	Flat stage	Marianne Vos (NED)
Total			349.7 km (217.3 mi)		

== Classification leadership ==
Stage	Winner	General classification	Points classification	Sprint classification	Young rider classification
P	Annette Edmondson	Annette Edmondson	Annette Edmondson	Not awarded	Swinkels Karlijn
1	Alice Barnes	Alice Barnes	Alice Barnes	Marianne Vos	Alice Barnes
2a	Elinor Barker	Alice Barnes	Marianne Vos	Marianne Vos	Alice Barnes
2b	Marianne Vos	Marianne Vos	Marianne Vos	Marianne Vos	Alice Barnes
3	Marianne Vos	Marianne Vos	Marianne Vos	Marianne Vos	Alice Barnes
Final Classification		Marianne Vos	Marianne Vos	Marianne Vos	Alice Barnes

== See also ==
- 2017 in women's road cycling
