= 2012 Sengers Ladies Cycling Team season =

2012 Sengers Ladies Cycling Team
- UCI Team ranking: 15th

Season victories
- One-day races: 0
- Stage race overall: 1
- Stage race stages: 4
- Best ranked rider: Anna van der Breggen (15th)

The 2012 women's road cycling season was the first for Sengers Ladies Cycling Team (UCI code: SLT).

== Roster ==
Ages as of 1 January 2012.

Rider	Date of birth
Anna van der Breggen (NED)	April 18, 1990 (aged 22)
Kimberly Buyl (BEL)	September 11, 1988 (aged 24)
Sofie De Nys (BEL)	November 3, 1985 (aged 27)
Eline De Roover (BEL)	April 4, 1992 (aged 20)
Eveline Dergent (BEL)	June 22, 1992 (aged 20)
Claudia Koster (NED)	March 22, 1992 (aged 20)
Birgit Lavrijssen (NED)	January 16, 1991 (aged 21)
Sofie Leemans (BEL)	January 27, 1992 (aged 20)

Rider	Date of birth
Anouk Rockx (NED)	January 2, 1992 (aged 20)
Inge Roggeman (BEL)	April 13, 1981 (aged 31)
Geerike Schreurs (NED)	May 19, 1989 (aged 23)
Emma Silversides (GBR)	October 2, 1978 (aged 34)
Céline Van Severen (BEL)	September 17, 1993 (aged 19)
Cindy Vandermeulen (BEL)	December 15, 1980 (aged 32)
Karen Verhestraeten (BEL)	April 23, 1991 (aged 21)
Vera Koedooder (NED)	October 31, 1983 (aged 29)

== Season victories ==
Single day and stage races 2012
Date	Nation	Race	Cat.	Winner
12 July	France	Stage 1 Tour de Bretagne Féminin	2.2	Anna van der Breggen (NED)
13 July	France	Stage 2 (ITT) Tour de Bretagne Féminin	2.2	Anna van der Breggen (NED)
15 July	France	Stage 4 Tour de Bretagne Féminin	2.2	Anna van der Breggen (NED)
15 July	France	Tour de Bretagne Féminin	2.2	Anna van der Breggen (NED)
20 July	France	Stage 2 (ITT) Tour Féminin en Limousin	2.2	Anna van der Breggen (NED)

== Results in major races ==
=== Single day races ===
Results at the 2012 UCI Women's Road World Cup races
Date	#	Race	Best rider	Place
10 March	1	Ronde van Drenthe	(Netherlands) Anna van der Breggen	49
25 March	2	Trofeo Alfredo Binda-Comune di Cittiglio		
1 April	3	Tour of Flanders		
18 April	4	La Flèche Wallonne Féminine		
13 May	5	Tour of Chongming Island		
17 August	6	Open de Suède Vårgårda TTT		
19 August	7	Open de Suède Vårgårda	-	-
25 August	8	GP de Plouay		
Final individual classification				
Final team classification				

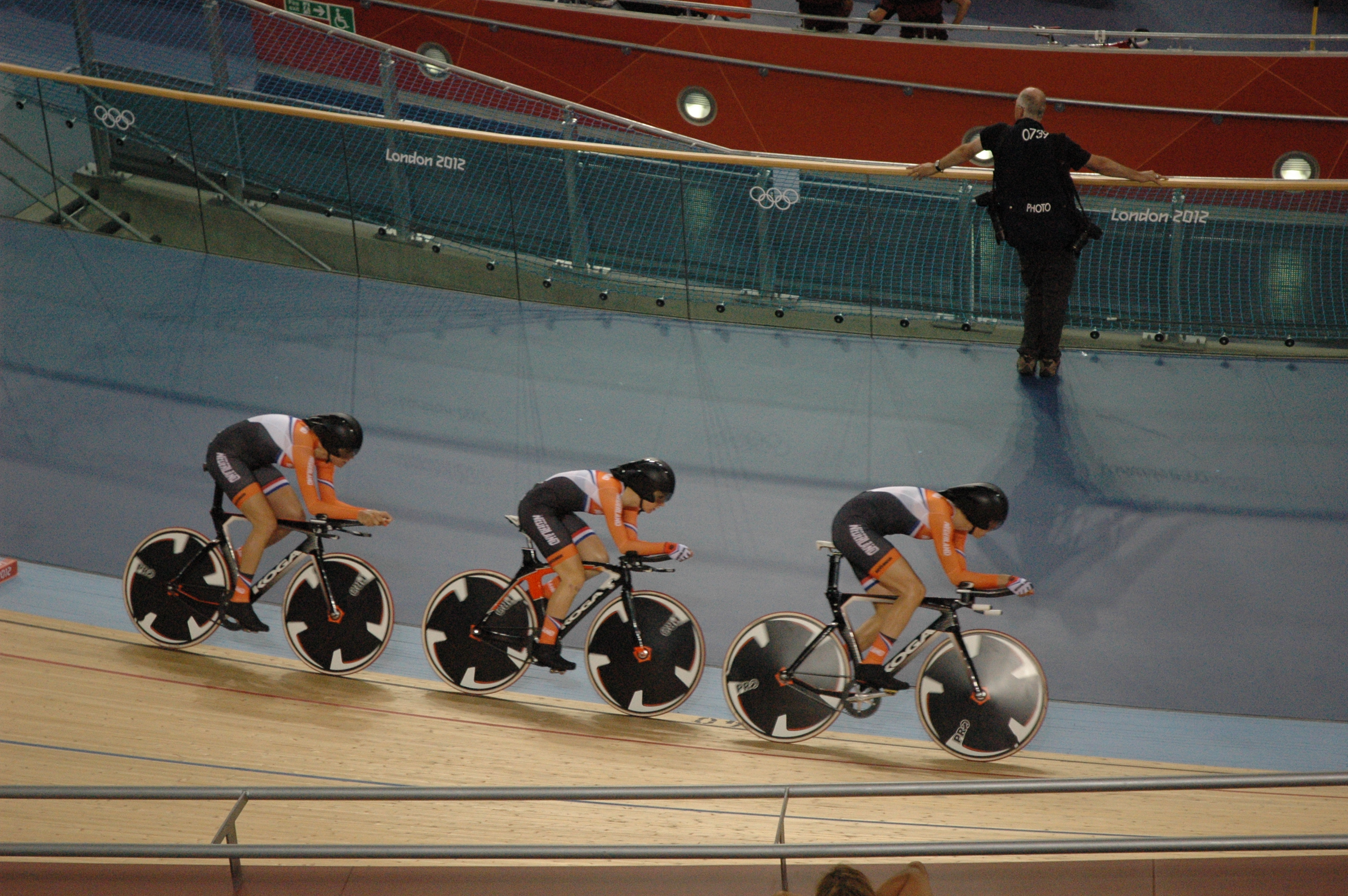
Koedooder (right) riding the team pursuit at the Summer Olympics together with Ellen van Dijk and Amy Pieters.

Other major single day races
Date	Race	Rider	Place
29 July	2012 Summer Olympics – Women's road race (Note: Riders are part of the national team)	-	-
1 August	2012 Summer Olympics – Women's time trial (Note: Riders are part of the national team)	-	-
3-4 August	2012 Summer Olympics – Women's team pursuit (Note: Together with Ellen van Dijk, Kirsten Wild and Amy Pieters as part of the national team)	Vera Koedooder (NED) (With Ellen van Dijk, Kirsten Wild and Amy Pieters)	6th
16 September	UCI Road World Championships – Women's team time trial	Sengers Ladies Cycling Team	12th
18 September	UCI Road World Championships – Women's time trial (Note: Riders are part of the national team)	Anna van der Breggen (NED)	11th
22 September	UCI Road World Championships – Women's road race (Note: Riders are part of the national team)	Anna van der Breggen (NED)	5th

=== Grand Tours ===
Results of the team in the grand tours
Grand tour	Giro d'Italia Femminile
Rider (classification)	Anna van der Breggen (22nd)
Victories	0 stage wins

== Other achievements ==
=== Dutch national record, team pursuit ===
Vera Koedooder, as part of the national team, broke together with Ellen van Dijk and Kirsten Wild the Dutch team pursuit record at the 2012 Summer Olympics.

Time	Speed (km/h)	Cyclists	Event	Location of race	Date	Ref
3:20.013	53.996	Vera Koedooder (Note: As part of the national selection) (with Ellen van Dijk and Kirsten Wild)	2012 Summer Olympics (first round)	(United Kingdom) London	4 August 2012	

== UCI World Ranking ==
The team finished 15th in the UCI ranking for teams.

Individual UCI World Ranking
Rank	Rider	Points
15	Anna van der Breggen (NED)	260.67
168	Vera Koedooder (NED)	18.67
455	Birgit Lavrijssen (NED)	1
455	Geerike Schreurs (NED)	1
