= 2012 AA Drink–leontien.nl season =

2012 AA Drink–leontien.nl
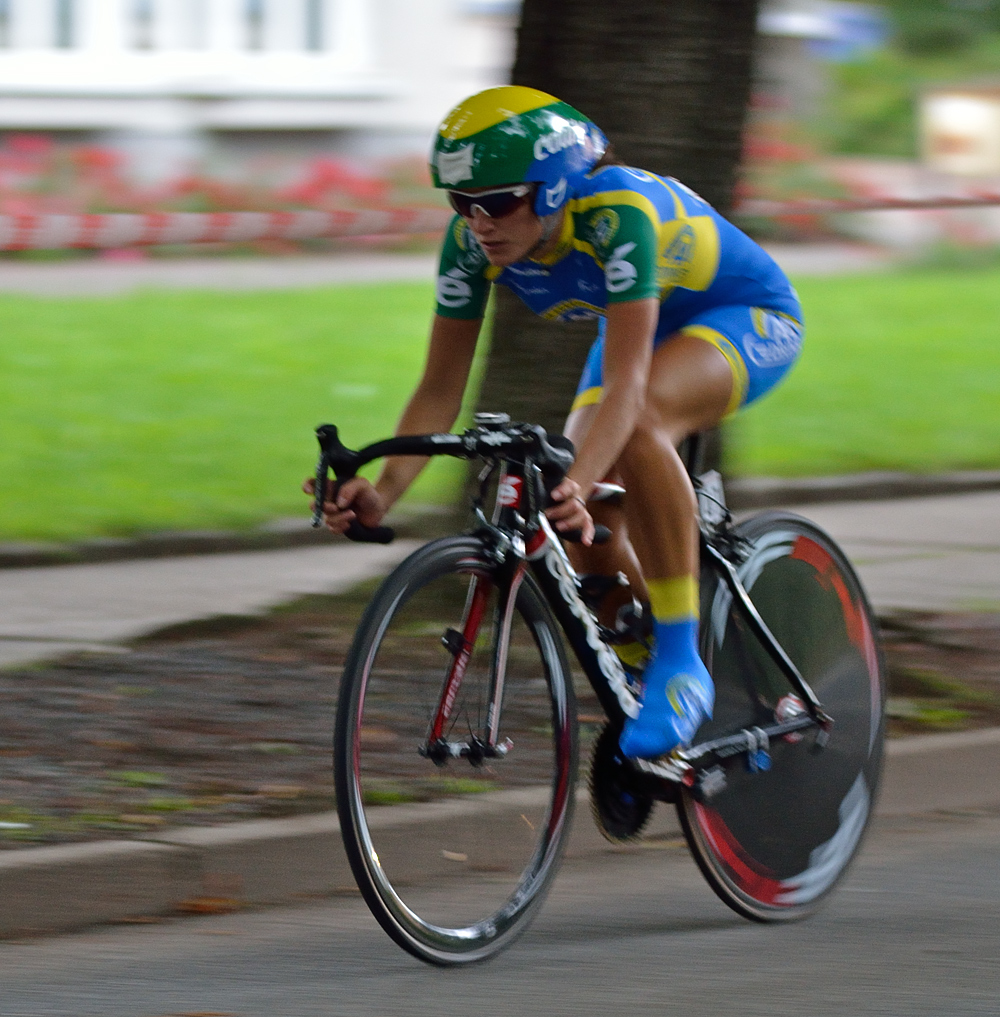
- Lizzie Armitstead in 2012
- UCI Team ranking: 4th

Season victories
- One-day races
- Stage race overall
- Best ranked rider: Shelley Olds (10th)

The 2012 women's road cycling season was the eighth (and last) year for AA Drink–leontien.nl (UCI code: LNL), which began as Van Bemmelen–AA Drink in 2005.

== Roster ==
The 2012 women's road racing team included six riders who were formerly members of the disbanded Garmin–Cervélo women's team: British cyclists Emma Pooley, Lizzie Armitstead, Sharon Laws and Lucy Martin, Belgian Jessie Daams and Australian Carla Ryan.

Ages as of 1 January 2012.

Rider	Date of birth
Lizzie Armitstead (GBR)	18 December 1988 (aged 23)
Chantal Blaak (NED)	22 October 1989 (aged 22)
Lucinda Brand (NED)	2 July 1989 (aged 22)
Jessie Daams (BEL)	28 May 1990 (aged 21)
Marijn de Vries (NED)	19 November 1978 (aged 33)
Sharon Laws (GBR)	7 July 1974 (aged 37)
Lucy Martin (GBR)	5 May 1990 (aged 21)
Shelley Olds (USA)	30 September 1980 (aged 31)

Rider	Date of birth
Madelene Olsson (SWE)	14 November 1982 (aged 29)
Emma Pooley (GBR)	3 October 1982 (aged 29)
Carla Ryan (AUS)	21 September 1985 (aged 26)
Isabelle Söderberg (SWE)	28 May 1989 (aged 22)
Marieke van Nek (NED)	14 November 1988 (aged 23)
Marieke van Wanroij (NED)	5 July 1979 (aged 32)
Kirsten Wild (NED)	15 October 1982 (aged 29)

== Season victories ==
Single day and stage races 2012
Date	Nation	Race	Cat.	Winner

Ladies Tour of Qatar Stages 1 & 3, Kirsten Wild
Omloop van het Hageland – Tielt-Winge, Lizzie Armitstead
Gent – Wevelgem WE, Lizzie Armitstead
Stage 4a Energiewacht Tour, Kirsten Wild
Tour of Chongming Island World Cup, Shelley Olds-Evans
Durango-Durango Emakumeen Saria, Emma Pooley
Overall Rabobank Ster Zeeuwsche Eilanden, Kirsten Wild

Stage 3, Kirsten Wild

Stage 6 Giro d'Italia Femminile, Shelley Olds-Evans
Stage 2 Tour de Feminin – Krasna Lipa, Kirsten Wild
Stage 3 Tour de Feminin – Krasna Lipa, Lucinda Brand
Stage 3 Tour Féminin en Limousin, Lucinda Brand
Stage 6 International Thüringen Rundfahrt der Frauen, Jessie Daams
Stage 2 Route de France Féminine, Lucinda Brand
Stages 1 & 2 Lotto–Decca Tour, Kirsten Wild
Overall Tour Cycliste Féminin International Ardèche, Emma Pooley

Stages 3 & 5, Emma Pooley
Stage 6, Carla Ryan

Stage 3 BrainWash Ladies Tour, Kirsten Wild

== Results in major races ==
=== Single day races ===
Results at the 2012 UCI Women's Road World Cup races
Date	#	Race	Best rider	Place
10 March	1	Ronde van Drenthe	(Netherlands) Kirsten Wild	2nd
25 March	2	Trofeo Alfredo Binda-Comune di Cittiglio	(United Kingdom) Emma Pooley	8th
1 April	3	Tour of Flanders	(Netherlands) Kirsten Wild	4th
18 April	4	La Flèche Wallonne Féminine	(Netherlands) Lucinda Brand	4th
13 May	5	Tour of Chongming Island	(United States) Shelley Olds	1st
17 August	6	Open de Suède Vårgårda TTT	AA Drink–leontien.nl	4th
19 August	7	Open de Suède Vårgårda	(United States) Shelley Olds	4th
25 August	8	GP de Plouay	(Netherlands) Lucinda Brand	14th
Final individual classification			(United States) Shelley Olds	5th
Final team classification			AA Drink–leontien.nl	4th

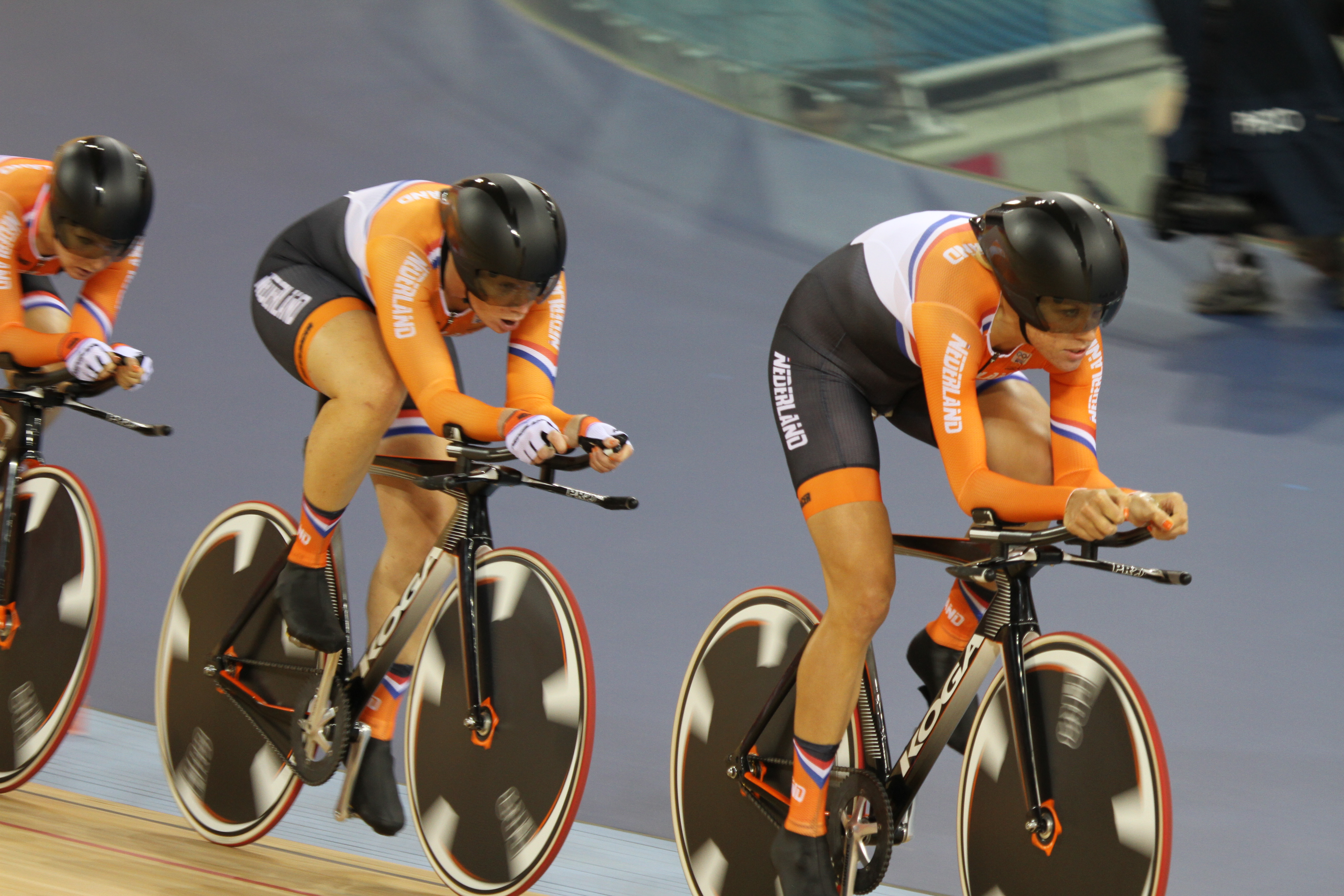
Wild (centre) riding the team pursuit at the Summer Olympics together with Ellen van Dijk and Amy Pieters.

Other major single day races
Date	Race	Rider	Place
29 July	2012 Summer Olympics – Women's road race (Note: Riders are part of the national team)	Lizzie Armitstead (GBR)	2nd
1 August	2012 Summer Olympics – Women's time trial (Note: Riders are part of the national team)	Emma Pooley (GBR)	6th
3-4 August	2012 Summer Olympics – Women's team pursuit (Note: Together with Ellen van Dijk, Amy Pieters and Vera Koedooder as part of the national team)	Kirsten Wild (NED) (with Ellen van Dijk, Amy Pieters and Vera Koedooder)	6th
16 September	UCI Road World Championships – Women's team time trial	AA Drink–leontien.nl	3rd
18 September	UCI Road World Championships – Women's time trial (Note: Riders are part of the national team)	Emma Pooley (GBR)	4th
22 September	UCI Road World Championships – Women's road race (Note: Riders are part of the national team)	Emma Pooley (GBR)	15th

=== Grand Tours ===
Results of the team in the grand tours
Grand tour	Giro d'Italia Femminile
Rider (classification)	Emma Pooley
Victories	1 stage win

== Other achievements ==
=== Dutch national record, team pursuit ===
Kirsten Wild, as part of the national team, broke together with Ellen van Dijk and Vera Koedooder the Dutch team pursuit record at the 2012 Summer Olympics.

Time	Speed (km/h)	Cyclists	Event	Location of race	Date	Ref
3:20.013	53.996	Kirsten Wild (Note: As part of the national selection) (with Ellen van Dijk and Vera Koedooder)	2012 Summer Olympics (first round)	(United Kingdom) London	4 August 2012	

== UCI World Ranking ==
The team finished 4th in the UCI ranking for teams.

Individual UCI World Ranking
Rank	Rider	Points
10	Shelley Olds (USA)	393.75
12	Emma Pooley (GBR)	381.5
13	Kirsten Wild (NED)	373.75
14	Lizzie Armitstead (GBR)	365
39	Sharon Laws (NED)	182.5
84	Lucinda Brand (NED)	150
86	Chantal Blaak (NED)	66.25
84	Jessie Daams (BEL)	64.25
95	Carla Ryan (AUS)	59
145	Isabelle Söderberg (SWE)	29
147	Marijn de Vries (NED)	28
190	Lucy Martin (NED)	15
221	Marieke van Wanroij (NED)	12
