= 2012 Team Skil–Argos season =

2012 Team Skil–Argos
- UCI Team ranking: 14th

Season victories
- One-day races: 3
- Stage race overall: 0
- Stage race stages: 0
- Best ranked rider: Adrie Visser (26th)

The 2012 women's road cycling season was the second for Team Skil–Argos (started the season under the name Skil 1t4i, UCI code: SKI), which began as Team Skil-Argos in 2010.

== Roster ==
Ages as of 1 January 2012.

Rider	Date of birth
Regina Bruins (NED)	7 October 1986 (aged 25)
Suzanne de Goede (NED)	16 April 1984 (aged 27)
Anne de Wildt (NED)	29 October 1989 (aged 22)
Janneke Kanis (NED)	15 February 1985 (aged 26)
Kelly Markus (NED)	7 February 1993 (aged 18)

Rider	Date of birth
Amy Pieters (NED)	1 June 1991 (aged 20)
Esra Tromp (NED)	15 October 1990 (aged 21)
Monique van de Ree (NED)	2 March 1988 (aged 23)
Linda van Rijen (NED)	15 June 1988 (aged 23)
Adrie Visser (NED)	19 October 1983 (aged 28)

== Season victories ==
Single day and stage races 2012
Date	Nation	Race	Cat.	Winner
29 February	Belgium	Le Samyn des Dames	1.2	Adrie Visser (NED)
15 April	Netherlands	Ronde van Gelderland	1.2	Suzanne de Goede (NED)
4 August	Belgium	Erpe-Mere (Erondegem)	1.2	Adrie Visser (NED)

== Results in major races ==
=== Single day races ===
Results at the 2012 UCI Women's Road World Cup races
Date	#	Race	Best rider	Place
10 March	1	Ronde van Drenthe	(Netherlands) Adrie Visser	6th
25 March	2	Trofeo Alfredo Binda-Comune di Cittiglio	(Netherlands) Adrie Visser	16th
1 April	3	Tour of Flanders	(Netherlands) Adrie Visser	5th
18 April	4	La Flèche Wallonne Féminine	(Netherlands) Adrie Visser	31st
13 May	5	Tour of Chongming Island	-	-
17 August	6	Open de Suède Vårgårda TTT	Team Skil-Argos	7th
19 August	7	Open de Suède Vårgårda	(Netherlands) Amy Pieters	11th
25 August	8	GP de Plouay	-	-
Final individual classification			(Netherlands) Adrie Visser	12th
Final team classification			Team Skil-Argos	7th

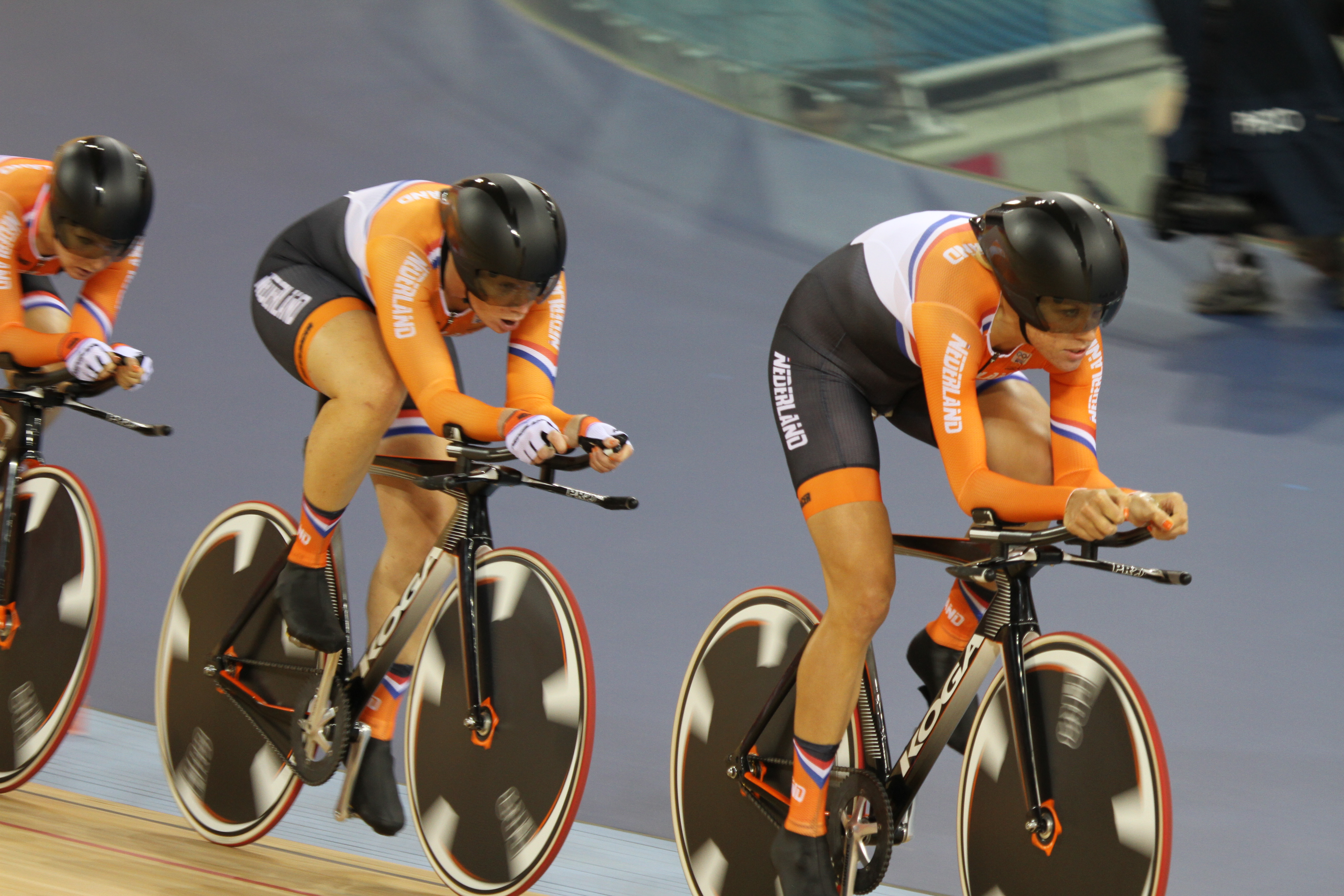
Pieters (left) riding the team pursuit at the Summer Olympics together with Ellen van Dijk and Kirsten Wild.

Other major single day races
Date	Race	Rider	Place
29 July	2012 Summer Olympics – Women's road race (Note: Riders are part of the national team)	-	-
1 August	2012 Summer Olympics – Women's time trial (Note: Riders are part of the national team)	-	-
3-4 August	2012 Summer Olympics – Women's team pursuit (Note: Together with Ellen van Dijk, Kirsten Wild and Vera Koedooder as part of the national team)	Amy Pieters (NED) (With Ellen van Dijk, Kirsten Wild and Vera Koedooder)	6th
16 September	UCI Road World Championships – Women's team time trial	Team Skil-Argos	11th
18 September	UCI Road World Championships – Women's time trial (Note: Riders are part of the national team)	-	-
22 September	UCI Road World Championships – Women's road race (Note: Riders are part of the national team)	Adrie Visser (NED)	69th

=== Grand Tours ===
Results of the team in the grand tours
Grand tour	Giro d'Italia Femminile
Rider (classification)	DNS
Victories	0 stage wins

== UCI World Ranking ==
The team finished 14th in the UCI ranking for teams.

Individual UCI World Ranking
Rank	Rider	Points
26	Adrie Visser (NED)	236.5
72	Amy Pieters (NED)	82.25
125	Suzanne de Goede (NED)	40.5
151	Janneke Kanis (NED)	27
363	Monique van de Ree (NED)	4.25
367	Esra Tromp (NED)	3.75
368	Kelly Markus (NED)	3.75
