= Team Ibis Cycles =

Team information
- UCI code: DPD
- Registered: United Kingdom
- Founded: 2011
- Discipline: Road (some riders active on the track)
- Status: UCI Women's Team
- Bicycles: 2011: Specialized; 2012: Ibis

Key personnel
- General manager: Toon van der Putten

Team name history
- 2011 2012: Specialized-DPD Pakketservice (non UCI); Team Ibis Cycles

Team Ibis Cycles (UCI code: DPD) was an UCI elite women's cycling team based in the United Kingdom in 2012. The team was founded as a non UCI team in 2011 called Specialized-DPD Pakketservice. It competed in road bicycle racing events, including UCI Women's Road World Cup events. The title sponsor is an American bicycle brand. The team announced at the end of 2012 that they would stop due to financial problems.

== Team roster ==
=== 2012 ===
Ages as of 1 January 2012.

Rider	Date of birth
Hannah Barnes (GBR)	4 May 1993 (aged 18)
Jane Barr (GBR)	24 November 1981 (aged 30)
Kayleigh Brogan (Note: Brogan joined the team on 9 July.) (GBR)	16 January 1992 (aged 19)
Aafke Eshuis (NED)	24 November 1987 (aged 24)
Anne Ewing (GBR)	21 July 1987 (aged 24)
Pippa Handley (Note: Handley left the team on 15 July.) (GBR)	25 August 1978 (aged 33)
Britt Jansen (NED)	5 December 1991 (aged 20)

Rider	Date of birth
Julie Leth (DEN)	13 July 1992 (aged 19)
Esther Olthuis (NED)	16 November 1978 (aged 33)
Eileen Roe (GBR)	24 September 1989 (aged 22)
Martina Thomasson (SWE)	2 February 1985 (aged 26)
Laura Trott (GBR)	24 April 1992 (aged 19)
Natalie van Gogh (NED)	14 September 1974 (aged 37)
Berdienke Paus (Note: Paus was not UCI registered.) (NED)	13 February 1988 (aged 23)

== 2012 season ==
Laura Trott became (as part of the British national team) two times Olympic Champion at the 2012 Summer Olympics (omnium, team pursuit), 2012 Omnium's World Champion and won the 2011–2012 UCI Track Cycling World Cup (team pursuit) and became 3rd in the omnium

- 3rd Sparkassen Giro Bochum; Eileen Roe
- 3rd Danish National Road Championships, road race; Julie Leth
- 3rd Danish National Road Championships, time trial; Julie Leth

=== Results in major races ===
Results at the 2012 UCI Women's Road World Cup races
Date	#	Race	Best rider	Place
10 March	1	Ronde van Drenthe	(Sweden) Martina Thomasson	55th
25 March	2	Trofeo Alfredo Binda-Comune di Cittiglio	-	-
1 April	3	Tour of Flanders	-	-
18 April	4	La Flèche Wallonne Féminine	-	-
13 May	5	Tour of Chongming Island	-	-
17 August	6	Open de Suède Vårgårda TTT	Team Ibis Cycles	8th
19 August	7	Open de Suède Vårgårda	(Denmark) Julie Leth	25th
25 August	8	GP de Plouay	-	-
Final individual classification			(Netherlands) Esther Olthuis (Denmark) Julie Leth (Netherlands) Natalie van Gogh (United Kingdom) Eileen Roe	64th
Final team classification			Team Ibis Cycles	13th

== UCI World Ranking ==
The team finished 32nd in the 2012 UCI ranking for teams.

2012 Individual UCI World Ranking
Rank	Rider	Points
289	Julie Leth (DEN)	7.5
337	Esther Olthuis (NED)	5.5
425	Natalie van Gogh (NED)	2.5
425	Eileen Roe (GBR)	2.5
