= List of rosters for Dolmans–Landscaping and its successors =

The List of Boels–Dolmans Cycling Team riders contains riders from the UCI women's cycling team Boels–Dolmans Cycling Team. In 2010 the team existed under the name Dolmans Landscaping cycleteam, but was not an UCI women's team.

== 2021 SD Worx Cycling team ==
As of 13 January 2021.

Rider	Date of birth
Karol-Ann Canuel (CAN)	18 April 1988 (age 38)
Elena Cecchini (ITA)	25 May 1992 (age 34)
Jolien D'Hoore (BEL)	14 March 1990 (age 36)
Niamh Fisher-Black (NZL)	12 August 2000 (age 26)
Roxane Fournier (FRA)	7 November 1991 (age 35)
Christine Majerus (LUX)	25 February 1987 (age 39)
Ashleigh Moolman (RSA)	9 December 1985 (age 40)

Rider	Date of birth
Nikola Nosková (CZE)	1 July 1997 (age 29)
Amy Pieters (NED)	1 June 1991 (age 35)
Anna Shackley (GBR)	17 May 2001 (age 25)
Lonneke Uneken (NED)	2 March 2000 (age 26)
Chantal van den Broek-Blaak (NED)	22 October 1989 (age 37)
Anna van der Breggen (NED)	18 April 1990 (age 36)
Demi Vollering (NED)	15 November 1996 (age 30)

== 2020 Boels–Dolmans Cycling team ==
As of 20 January 2020.

Rider	Date of birth
Eva Buurman (NED)	7 September 1994 (age 32)
Karol-Ann Canuel (CAN)	18 April 1988 (age 38)
Jolien D'Hoore (BEL)	14 March 1990 (age 36)
Amalie Dideriksen (DNK)	24 May 1996 (age 30)
Katie Hall (USA)	6 January 1987 (age 39)
Christine Majerus (LUX)	25 February 1987 (age 39)

Rider	Date of birth
Amy Pieters (NED)	1 June 1991 (age 35)
Skylar Schneider (USA)	3 September 1998 (age 28)
Lonneke Uneken (NED)	2 March 2000 (age 26)
Jip van den Bos (NED)	12 April 1996 (age 30)
Chantal van den Broek-Blaak (NED)	22 October 1989 (age 37)
Anna van der Breggen (NED)	18 April 1990 (age 36)

== 2019 Boels–Dolmans Cycling team ==
As of 5 February 2019.

Rider	Date of birth
Chantal Blaak (NED)	22 October 1989 (age 37)
Eva Buurman (NED)	7 September 1994 (age 32)
Karol-Ann Canuel (CAN)	18 April 1988 (age 38)
Jolien D'Hoore (BEL)	14 March 1990 (age 36)
Amalie Dideriksen (DNK)	24 May 1996 (age 30)
Katie Hall (USA)	6 January 1987 (age 39)

Rider	Date of birth
Annika Langvad (DNK)	22 March 1984 (age 42)
Christine Majerus (LUX)	25 February 1987 (age 39)
Amy Pieters (NED)	1 June 1991 (age 35)
Skylar Schneider (USA)	3 September 1998 (age 28)
Jip van den Bos (NED)	12 April 1996 (age 30)
Anna van der Breggen (NED)	18 April 1990 (age 36)

== 2018 Boels–Dolmans Cycling Team ==
Rider	Date of birth
Chantal Blaak (NED)	22 October 1989 (age 37)
Karol-Ann Canuel (CAN)	18 April 1988 (age 38)
Lizzie Deignan (GBR)	18 December 1988 (age 37)
Amalie Dideriksen (DEN)	24 May 1996 (age 30)
Megan Guarnier (USA)	4 May 1985 (age 41)
Christine Majerus (LUX)	25 February 1987 (age 39)

Rider	Date of birth
Amy Pieters (NED)	1 June 1991 (age 35)
Anna Plichta (POL)	10 February 1992 (age 34)
Skylar Schneider (USA)	3 September 1998 (age 28)
Jip van den Bos (NED)	12 April 1996 (age 30)
Anna van der Breggen (NED)	18 April 1990 (age 36)

== 2016 Boels–Dolmans Cycling Team ==
As of 1 January 2016. Ages as of 1 January 2016.

Rider	Date of birth
Lizzie Armitstead (GBR)	18 December 1988 (aged 27)
Chantal Blaak (NED)	22 October 1989 (aged 26)
Karol-Ann Canuel (CAN)	18 April 1988 (aged 27)
Demi de Jong (NED)	11 February 1995 (aged 20)
Amalie Dideriksen (DEN)	24 May 1996 (aged 19)
Megan Guarnier (USA)	4 May 1985 (aged 30)

Rider	Date of birth
Nikki Harris (GBR)	30 December 1986 (aged 29)
Romy Kasper (GER)	5 May 1988 (aged 27)
Christine Majerus (LUX)	25 February 1987 (aged 28)
Katarzyna Pawłowska (POL)	16 August 1989 (aged 26)
Evelyn Stevens (USA)	9 May 1983 (aged 32)
Ellen van Dijk (NED)	11 February 1987 (aged 28)

== 2015 Boels–Dolmans Cycling Team ==
As of 1 January 2015. Ages as of 1 January 2015.

Rider	Date of birth
Lizzie Deignan (GBR)	December 18, 1988 (aged 26)
Chantal Blaak (NED)	October 22, 1989 (aged 25)
Amalie Dideriksen (DEN)	May 24, 1996 (aged 18)
Ellen van Dijk (NED)	February 11, 1987 (aged 27)
Megan Guarnier (USA)	May 4, 1985 (aged 29)
Demi de Jong (NED)	February 11, 1995 (aged 19)

Rider	Date of birth
Sanne van Paassen (NED)	October 27, 1988 (aged 26)
Romy Kasper (GER)	May 5, 1988 (aged 26)
Christine Majerus (LUX)	February 25, 1987 (aged 27)
Katarzyna Pawłowska (POL)	August 16, 1989 (aged 25)
Evelyn Stevens (USA)	May 9, 1983 (aged 31)

== 2014 Boels–Dolmans Cycling Team ==
As of 1 March 2014. Ages as of 1 January 2014.

Rider	Date of birth
Lizzie Armitstead (GBR)	December 18, 1988 (aged 25)
Jessie Daams (BEL)	May 28, 1990 (aged 23)
Ellen van Dijk (NED)	February 11, 1987 (aged 26)
Janneke Ensing (NED)	September 21, 1986 (aged 27)
Megan Guarnier (USA)	May 4, 1985 (aged 28)
Demi de Jong (NED)	February 11, 1995 (aged 18)
Sanne van Paassen (Note: Van Paassen joined the team on 1 March.) (NED)	October 27, 1988 (aged 25)

Rider	Date of birth
Romy Kasper (GER)	May 5, 1988 (aged 25)
Nina Kessler (NED)	July 4, 1988 (aged 25)
Christine Majerus (LUX)	February 25, 1987 (aged 26)
Katarzyna Pawłowska (POL)	August 16, 1989 (aged 24)
Emma Trott (Note: Trott retired on 11 May) (GBR)	December 24, 1989 (aged 24)
Marieke van Wanroij (NED)	July 5, 1979 (aged 34)
Nicky Zijlaard (NED)	November 21, 1995 (aged 18)

== 2013 Boels–Dolmans Cycling Team ==
As of 1 January 2013. Ages as of 1 January 2013.

Rider	Date of birth
Lizzie Armitstead (GBR)	December 18, 1988 (aged 24)
Martine Bras (NED)	May 17, 1978 (aged 34)
Jessie Daams (BEL)	May 28, 1990 (aged 22)
Kim de Baat (NED)	May 29, 1991 (aged 21)
Romy Kasper (GER)	February 10, 1992 (aged 20)
Nina Kessler (NED)	July 4, 1988 (aged 24)

Rider	Date of birth
Lucy Martin (GBR)	May 5, 1990 (aged 22)
Pauliena Rooijakkers (NED)	May 12, 1993 (aged 19)
Emma Trott (GBR)	December 24, 1989 (aged 23)
Marieke van Wanroij (NED)	July 5, 1979 (aged 33)
Adrie Visser (NED)	October 19, 1983 (aged 29)

== 2012 Dolmans-Boels Cycling Team ==
Ages as of 1 January 2012.

Rider	Date of birth
Martine Bras (NED)	May 17, 1978 (aged 33)
Elena Chalykh (Note: Chalykh joined the team on 14 March.) (AZE)	March 25, 1974 (aged 37)
Lieselot Decroix (BEL)	May 12, 1987 (aged 24)
Karen Elzing (NED)	May 14, 1993 (aged 18)
Janneke Ensing (NED)	September 21, 1986 (aged 25)
Alie Gercama (NED)	July 25, 1990 (aged 21)
Nina Kessler (NED)	July 4, 1988 (aged 23)
Anouska Koster (NED)	August 20, 1993 (aged 18)

Rider	Date of birth
Marissa Otten (Note: Otten left the team on 31 May.) (NED)	July 11, 1989 (aged 22)
Mascha Pijnenborg (NED)	June 30, 1981 (aged 30)
Pauliena Rooijakkers (NED)	May 12, 1993 (aged 18)
Winanda Spoor (NED)	January 27, 1991 (aged 20)
Emma Trott (GBR)	December 24, 1989 (aged 22)
Irene van den Broek (NED)	August 26, 1980 (aged 31)
Laura van der Kamp (NED)	July 24, 1992 (aged 19)

== 2011 Dolmans Landscaping Team ==
As of 1 January 2011. Ages as of 1 January 2011.

Rider	Date of birth
Daniëlle Bekkering (NED)	December 25, 1976 (aged 34)
Evelien Bekkering (NED)	November 21, 1978 (aged 32)
Martine Bras (NED)	May 17, 1978 (aged 32)
Shanne Braspennincx (NED)	May 18, 1991 (aged 19)
Petra Dijkman (NED)	November 13, 1979 (aged 31)
Janneke Ensing (NED)	September 21, 1986 (aged 24)
Alie Gercama (NED)	July 25, 1990 (aged 20)

Rider	Date of birth
Nina Kessler (NED)	July 4, 1988 (aged 22)
Birgit Lavrijssen (NED)	January 16, 1991 (aged 19)
Marissa Otten (NED)	July 11, 1989 (aged 21)
Mascha Pijnenborg (NED)	June 30, 1981 (aged 29)
Geerike Schreurs (NED)	May 19, 1989 (aged 21)
Winanda Spoor (NED)	January 27, 1991 (aged 19)
Laura van der Kamp (NED)	July 24, 1992 (aged 18)

== 2010 Dolmans Landscaping cycleteam (non UCI) ==
The team was in this year not a 2010 UCI women's team.

- (Netherlands) Daniëlle Bekkering
- (Netherlands) Eyelien Bekkering
- (Netherlands) Shanne Braspennincx
- (Netherlands) Janneke Ensing
- (Netherlands) Josephine Groenveld
- (Netherlands) Sione Jongstra
- (Netherlands) Nina Kessler
- (Netherlands) Laura Meurs
- (Netherlands) Agnes Ronner
- (Netherlands) Winanda Spoor
- (Netherlands) Debby van den Berg
- (Netherlands) Kimberley van den Berg
- (Netherlands) Marieke van Nek

== See also ==
List of UCI women's teams riders

- List of Boels Dolmans Cycling Team riders
- List of Parkhotel Valkenburg Continental Team riders
- List of Team Giant-Shimano riders
- List of Specialized–lululemon riders
- List of Vrienden van het Platteland riders
