= List of rosters for Parkhotel Valkenburg Cycling Team and its successors =

The List of Parkhotel Valkenburg Cycling Team riders contains riders from the UCI women's cycling team VolkerWessels Women Cyclingteam. In 2013 the team existed under the name Parkhotel Valkenburg p/b Math Salden, but was not an UCI women's team.

== 2015 Parkhotel Valkenburg Continental Team ==
As of 1 January 2015. Ages as of 1 January 2015.

Rider	Date of birth
Sophie de Boer (NED)	December 12, 1990 (aged 24)
Janneke Ensing (NED)	September 21, 1986 (aged 28)
Ilona Hoeksma (NED)	May 22, 1991 (aged 23)
Riejanne Markus (NED)	September 1, 1994 (aged 20)
Jermaine Post (NED)	June 10, 1992 (aged 22)
Pauliena Rooijakkers (NED)	May 12, 1993 (aged 21)

Rider	Date of birth
Rozanne Slik (NED)	April 12, 1991 (aged 23)
Chanella Stougje (NED)	October 23, 1996 (aged 18)
Jip van den Bos (NED)	April 12, 1996 (aged 18)
Bianca van den Hoek (NED)	July 28, 1976 (aged 38)
Natalie van Gogh (NED)	September 14, 1974 (aged 40)
Marijn de Vries (NED)	19 November 1978 (aged 36)

== 2014 Parkhotel Valkenburg Continental Team ==
As of 1 January 2014. Ages as of 1 January 2014.

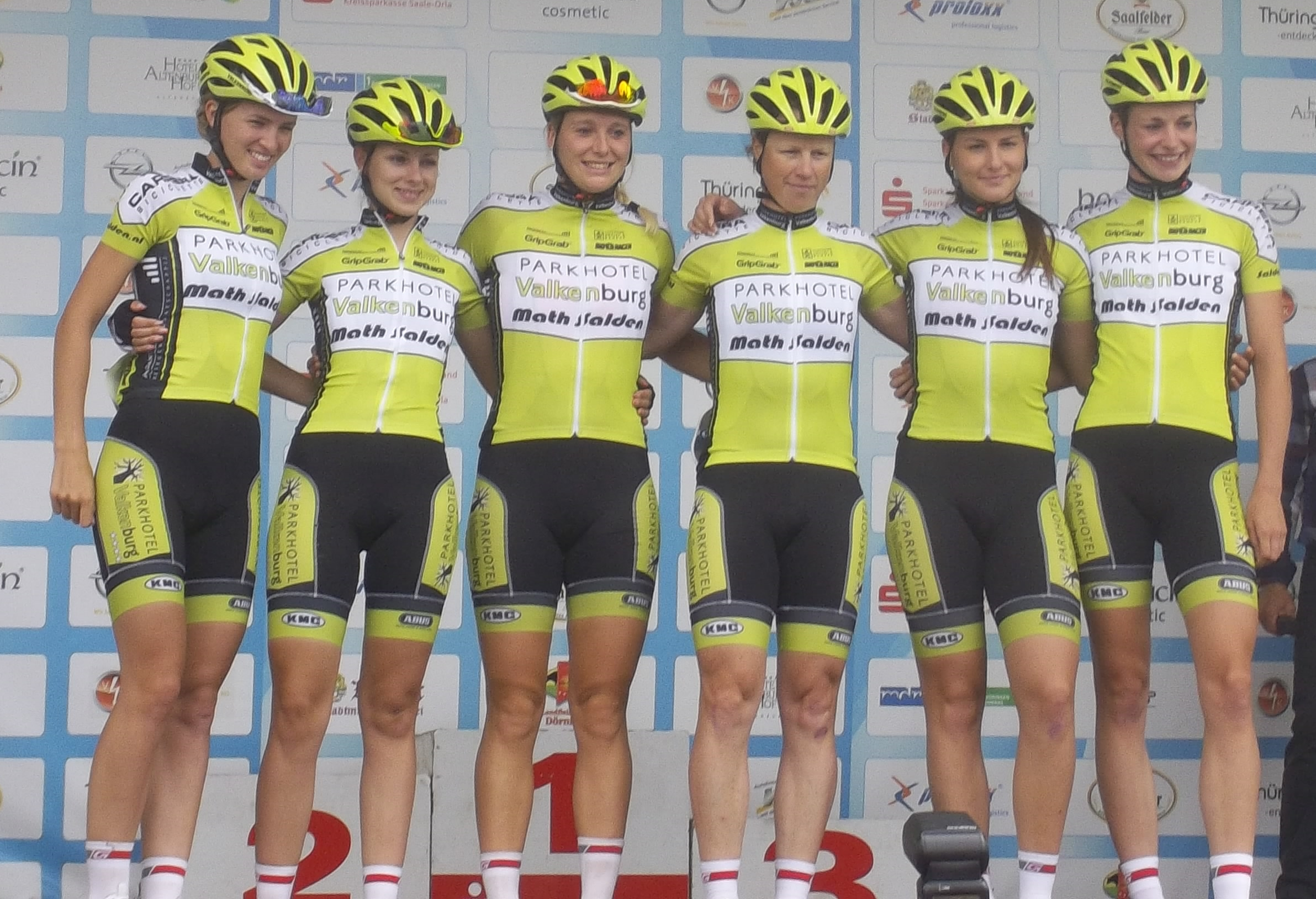
Six riders of the team at the 2014 Thüringen Rundfahrt der Frauen.

Rider	Date of birth
Kim de Baat (NED)	May 29, 1991 (aged 22)
Sophie de Boer (NED)	December 12, 1990 (aged 23)
Aafke Eshuis (NED)	November 24, 1987 (aged 26)
Natalie van Gogh (NED)	September 14, 1974 (aged 39)
Bianca van den Hoek (NED)	July 28, 1976 (aged 37)
Ilona Hoeksma (NED)	May 22, 1991 (aged 22)
Riejanne Markus (NED)	September 1, 1994 (aged 19)
Marissa Otten (NED)	July 11, 1989 (aged 24)

Rider	Date of birth
Kirsten Peetoom (NED)	October 1, 1981 (aged 32)
Jermaine Post (NED)	June 10, 1992 (aged 21)
Monique van de Ree (NED)	March 2, 1988 (aged 25)
Pauliena Rooijakkers (Note: Rooijakkers joined the team on 9 February.) (NED)	May 12, 1993 (aged 20)
Rozanne Slik (NED)	April 12, 1991 (aged 22)
Lisanne Soemanta (NED)	May 1, 1987 (aged 26)
Esra Tromp (NED)	October 15, 1990 (aged 23)

== 2013 Parkhotel Valkenburg p/b Math Salden (non UCI) ==
The team was in this year not a 2013 UCI women's team.

- (Netherlands) Aafke Eshuis
- (Netherlands) Ilona Hoeksma
- (Netherlands) Inge Klep
- (Netherlands) Claudia Koster
- (Netherlands) Riejanne Markus
- (New Zealand) Ashleigh Neave
- (Netherlands) Jermaine Post
- (Netherlands) Rozanne Slik
- (Netherlands) Lisanne Soemanta
- (Netherlands) Bianca van den Hoek
- (Netherlands) Nathaly van Wesdonk
- (Netherlands) Annelies Visser
- (Netherlands) Hannah Welter

== See also ==
List of UCI women's teams riders

- List of Boels Dolmans Cycling Team riders
- List of Parkhotel Valkenburg Continental Team riders
- List of Team Giant-Shimano riders
- List of Specialized–lululemon riders
- List of Vrienden van het Platteland riders
