= List of rosters for Skil–Koga and its successors =

The List of Team Argos-Shimano riders contains riders from the UCI women's cycling team Team Argos-Shimano, which have had the name Skil–Argos in 2012.

== 2018 Team Sunweb ==
As of 1 January 2018. Ages as of 1 January 2018.

Rider	Date of birth
Lucinda Brand (NED)	2 July 1989 (aged 28)
Leah Kirchmann (CAN)	30 June 1990 (aged 27)
Juliette Labous (FRA)	4 November 1998 (aged 19)
Liane Lippert (GER)	13 January 1998 (aged 19)
Floortje Mackaij (NED)	18 October 1995 (aged 22)

Rider	Date of birth
Pernille Mathiesen (DEN)	5 October 1997 (aged 20)
Coryn Rivera (USA)	26 August 1992 (aged 25)
Julia Soek (NED)	12 December 1990 (aged 27)
Ellen van Dijk (NED)	11 February 1987 (aged 30)
Ruth Winder (USA)	9 July 1993 (aged 24)

== 2017 Team Sunweb ==
As of 1 January 2017. Ages as of 1 January 2017.

Rider	Date of birth
Lucinda Brand (NED)	2 July 1989 (aged 27)
Leah Kirchmann (CAN)	30 June 1990 (aged 26)
Juliette Labous (FRA)	4 November 1998 (aged 18)
Liane Lippert (GER)	13 January 1998 (aged 18)
Floortje Mackaij (NED)	18 October 1995 (aged 21)
Rozanne Slik (NED)	12 April 1991 (aged 25)

Rider	Date of birth
Julia Soek (NED)	12 December 1990 (aged 26)
Sabrina Stultiens (NED)	8 July 1993 (aged 23)
Coryn Rivera (USA)	26 August 1992 (aged 24)
Ellen van Dijk (NED)	11 February 1987 (aged 29)
Molly Weaver (GBR)	15 March 1994 (aged 22)

== 2016 Team Liv–Plantur ==
As of 1 January 2016. Ages as of 1 January 2016.

Rider	Date of birth
Leah Kirchmann (CAN)	30 June 1990 (aged 25)
Floortje Mackaij (NED)	18 October 1995 (aged 20)
Riejanne Markus (NED)	1 September 1994 (aged 21)
Sara Mustonen (SWE)	8 February 1981 (aged 34)
Rozanne Slik (NED)	12 April 1991 (aged 24)

Rider	Date of birth
Julia Soek (NED)	12 December 1990 (aged 25)
Kyara Stijns (NED)	9 October 1995 (aged 20)
Sabrina Stultiens (NED)	8 July 1993 (aged 22)
Carlee Taylor (AUS)	15 February 1989 (aged 26)
Molly Weaver (GBR)	15 March 1994 (aged 21)

== 2015 Team Liv-Plantur ==
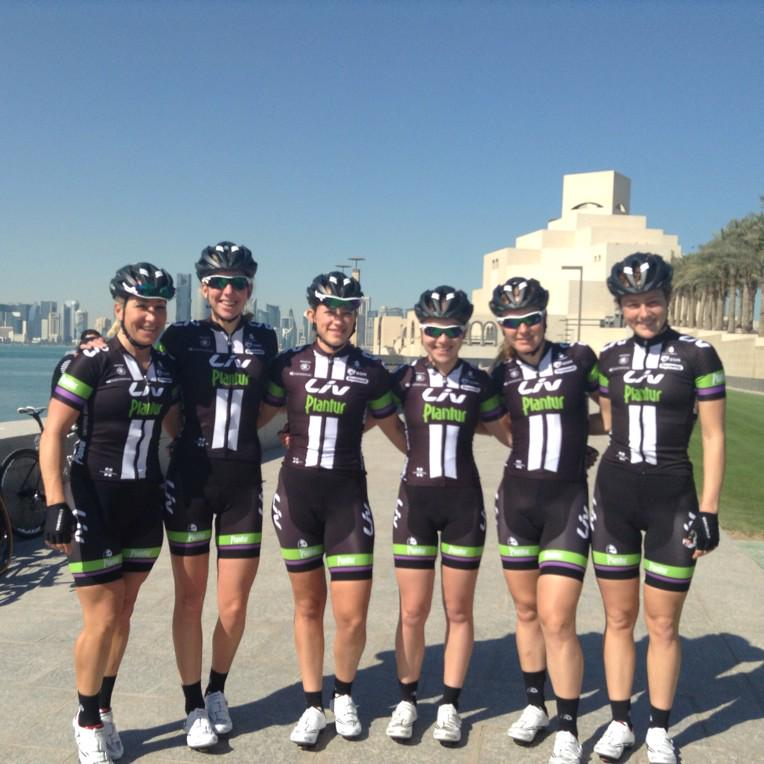
Squad during the 2015 Ladies Tour of Qatar

Ages as of 1 January 2015.

Rider	Date of birth
Lucy Garner (GBR)	20 September 1994 (aged 20)
Willeke Knol (NED)	10 April 1991 (aged 23)
Claudia Lichtenberg (GER)	17 November 1985 (aged 29)
Floortje Mackaij (NED)	18 October 1995 (aged 19)
Sara Mustonen (SWE)	8 February 1981 (aged 33)
Amy Pieters (NED)	June 1, 1991 (aged 23)

Rider	Date of birth
Maaike Polspoel (Note: Polspoel left the team on 15 May.) (BEL)	28 March 1989 (aged 25)
Julia Soek (NED)	December 12, 1990 (aged 24)
Kyara Stijns (NED)	9 October 1995 (aged 19)
Sabrina Stultiens (Note: Stultiens joined the team on 1 March.) (NED)	8 July 1993 (aged 21)
Molly Weaver (Note: Weaver joined the team on 1 June.) (GBR)	15 March 1994 (aged 20)

== 2014 Team Giant-Shimano ==
As of 1 January 2014. Ages as of 1 January 2014.

Rider	Date of birth
Marijn de Vries (NED)	19 November 1978 (aged 35)
Lucy Garner (GBR)	20 September 1994 (aged 19)
Claudia Häusler (GER)	17 November 1985 (aged 28)
Willeke Knol (NED)	10 April 1991 (aged 22)
Floortje Mackaij (NED)	18 October 1995 (aged 18)

Rider	Date of birth
Sara Mustonen (SWE)	8 February 1981 (aged 32)
Maaike Polspoel (BEL)	28 March 1989 (aged 24)
Julia Soek (NED)	12 December 1990 (aged 23)
Kyara Stijns (NED)	9 October 1995 (aged 18)
Kirsten Wild (NED)	15 October 1982 (aged 31)

== 2013 Team Argos-Shimano ==
Ages as of 1 January 2013.

Rider	Date of birth
Charlotte Becker (Note: Becker left the team on 25 May.) (GER)	19 May 1983 (aged 29)
Lucy Garner (GBR)	20 September 1994 (aged 18)
Elke Gebhardt (GER)	22 July 1983 (aged 29)
Marlen Jörend (Note: Jörend left the team on 29 May.) (GER)	1 February 1986 (aged 26)
Janneke Kanis (NED)	15 February 1985 (aged 27)
Willeke Knol (NED)	4 October 1991 (aged 21)

Rider	Date of birth
Kelly Markus (NED)	2 July 1993 (aged 19)
Amy Pieters (NED)	1 June 1991 (aged 21)
Esra Tromp (NED)	15 October 1990 (aged 22)
Kirsten Wild (NED)	15 October 1982 (aged 30)
Floortje Mackaij (Note: Mackaij joined the team on 1 August as a stagiaire.) (NED)	18 October 1995 (aged 17)

== 2012 Skil–Argos ==
Ages as of 1 January 2012.

Rider	Date of birth
Regina Bruins (NED)	7 October 1986 (aged 25)
Suzanne de Goede (NED)	16 April 1984 (aged 27)
Anne de Wildt (NED)	29 October 1989 (aged 22)
Janneke Kanis (NED)	15 February 1985 (aged 26)
Kelly Markus (NED)	7 February 1993 (aged 18)

Rider	Date of birth
Amy Pieters (NED)	1 June 1991 (aged 20)
Esra Tromp (NED)	15 October 1990 (aged 21)
Monique van de Ree (NED)	2 March 1988 (aged 23)
Linda van Rijen (NED)	15 June 1988 (aged 23)
Adrie Visser (NED)	19 October 1983 (aged 28)

== 2011 Skil Koga ==
- Christina Becker (GER)
- Regina Bruins (NED)
- Suzanne de Goede (NED)
- Anne de Wildt (NED) (From 23/6)
- Roxane Knetemann (NED) (Until 6/6)
- Kelly Markus (NED) (From 1/8 as trainee)
- Amy Pieters (NED)
- Alison Testroete (CAN)
- Esra Tromp (NED)
- Linda van Rijen (NED) (From 12/6)
- Hannah Welter (NED)

== See also ==
List of UCI women's teams riders

- List of Boels Dolmans Cycling Team riders
- List of Parkhotel Valkenburg Continental Team riders
- List of Team Giant-Shimano riders
- List of Specialized–lululemon riders
- List of Vrienden van het Platteland riders
