= List of Velocio–SRAM Pro Cycling riders =

The List of Velocio–SRAM Pro Cycling riders contains riders from Velocio–SRAM Pro Cycling.

== 2015 Specialized-lululemon ==
As of 1 January 2015. Ages as of 1 January 2015.

| Rider | Date of birth |
|---|---|
| Alena Amialiusik (BLR) | February 6, 1989 (aged 25) |
| Lisa Brennauer (GER) | June 8, 1988 (aged 26) |
| Karol-Ann Canuel (CAN) | April 18, 1988 (aged 26) |
| Tiffany Cromwell (AUS) | July 6, 1988 (aged 26) |
| Élise Delzenne (FRA) | January 28, 1989 (aged 25) |

| Rider | Date of birth |
|---|---|
| Barbara Guarischi (ITA) | February 10, 1990 (aged 24) |
| Mieke Kröger (GER) | July 18, 1993 (aged 21) |
| Loren Rowney (AUS) | October 14, 1988 (aged 26) |
| Tayler Wiles (USA) | July 20, 1989 (aged 25) |
| Trixi Worrack (GER) | September 28, 1981 (aged 33) |

== 2014 Specialized-lululemon ==
As of 1 January 2014. Ages as of 1 January 2014.

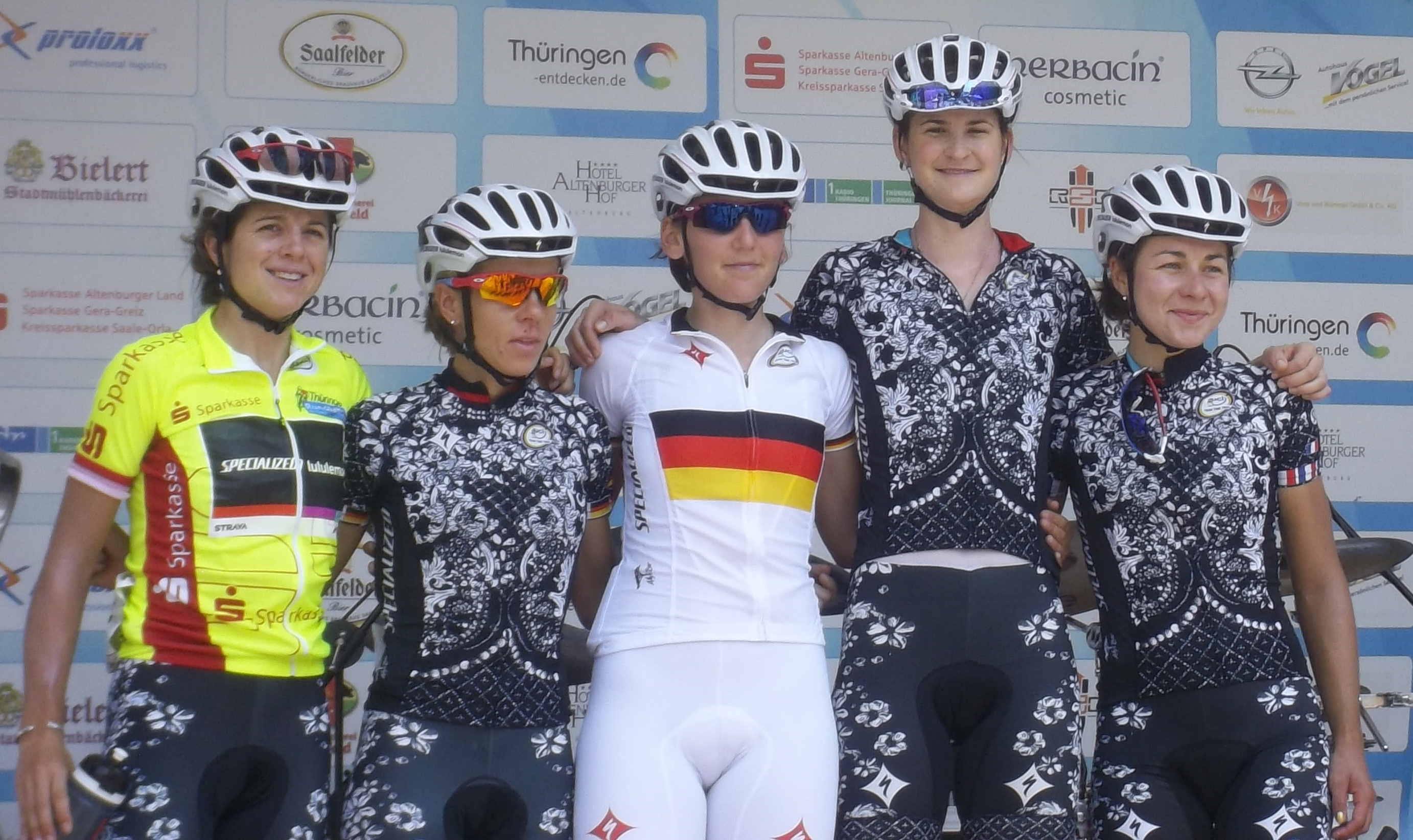
Five riders of the team at the 2014 Thüringen Rundfahrt der Frauen.

| Rider | Date of birth |
|---|---|
| Chantal Blaak (NED) | October 22, 1989 (aged 24) |
| Lisa Brennauer (GER) | June 8, 1988 (aged 25) |
| Karol-Ann Canuel (CAN) | April 18, 1988 (aged 25) |
| Tiffany Cromwell (AUS) | July 6, 1988 (aged 25) |
| Élise Delzenne (FRA) | January 28, 1989 (aged 24) |
| Loren Rowney (AUS) | October 14, 1988 (aged 25) |

| Rider | Date of birth |
|---|---|
| Carmen Small (USA) | April 20, 1980 (aged 33) |
| Ally Stacher (USA) | June 8, 1987 (aged 26) |
| Evelyn Stevens (USA) | May 9, 1983 (aged 30) |
| Tayler Wiles (USA) | July 20, 1989 (aged 24) |
| Trixi Worrack (GER) | September 28, 1981 (aged 32) |

== 2013 Specialized-lululemon ==
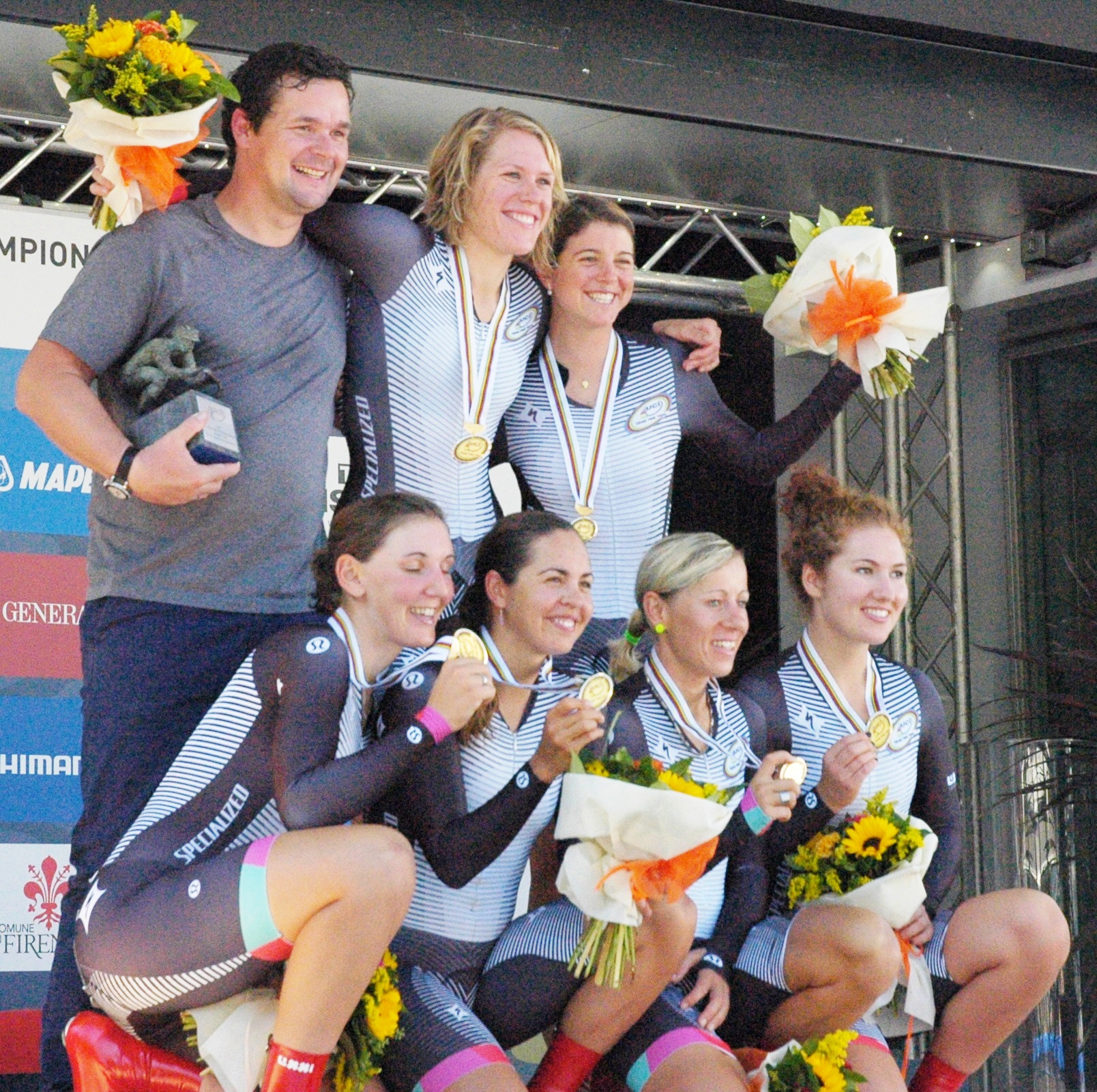
The team at the 2013 UCI Road World Championships

As of 1 January 2013. Ages as of 1 January 2013.

| Rider | Date of birth |
|---|---|
| Lisa Brennauer (GER) | June 8, 1988 (aged 24) |
| Gillian Carleton (CAN) | December 3, 1989 (aged 23) |
| Katie Colclough (GBR) | January 20, 1990 (aged 22) |
| Ellen van Dijk (NED) | February 11, 1987 (aged 25) |
| Loren Rowney (AUS) | October 14, 1988 (aged 24) |
| Carmen Small (USA) | April 20, 1980 (aged 32) |

| Rider | Date of birth |
|---|---|
| Ally Stacher (USA) | June 8, 1987 (aged 25) |
| Evelyn Stevens (USA) | May 9, 1983 (aged 29) |
| Ina-Yoko Teutenberg (GER) | October 28, 1974 (aged 38) |
| Tayler Wiles (USA) | July 20, 1989 (aged 23) |
| Trixi Worrack (GER) | September 28, 1981 (aged 31) |

== 2012 Team Specialized-lululemon ==
Ages as of 1 January 2012.

| Rider | Date of birth |
|---|---|
| Charlotte Becker (GER) | May 19, 1983 (aged 28) |
| Lisa Brennauer (GER) | June 8, 1988 (aged 23) |
| Katie Colclough (GBR) | January 20, 1990 (aged 21) |
| Ellen van Dijk (NED) | February 11, 1987 (aged 24) |
| Emilia Fahlin (SWE) | October 24, 1988 (aged 23) |
| Chloe Hosking (AUS) | October 1, 1990 (aged 21) |
| Clara Hughes (CAN) | September 27, 1972 (aged 39) |

| Rider | Date of birth |
|---|---|
| Amber Neben (USA) | February 18, 1975 (aged 36) |
| Loren Rowney (AUS) | October 14, 1988 (aged 23) |
| Ally Stacher (USA) | June 8, 1987 (aged 24) |
| Evelyn Stevens (USA) | May 9, 1983 (aged 28) |
| Ina-Yoko Teutenberg (GER) | October 28, 1974 (aged 37) |
| Trixi Worrack (GER) | September 28, 1981 (aged 30) |

== 2011 HTC-Highroad Women ==
Ages as of 1 January 2011.

| Rider | Date of birth |
|---|---|
| Judith Arndt (GER) | July 23, 1976 (aged 34) |
| Charlotte Becker (GER) | May 19, 1983 (aged 27) |
| Katie Colclough (GBR) | January 20, 1990 (aged 20) |
| Ellen van Dijk (NED) | February 11, 1987 (aged 23) |
| Emilia Fahlin (SWE) | October 24, 1988 (aged 22) |
| Chloe Hosking (AUS) | October 1, 1990 (aged 20) |
| Amanda Miller (USA) | December 13, 1986 (aged 24) |

| Rider | Date of birth |
|---|---|
| Amber Neben (USA) | February 18, 1975 (aged 35) |
| Ally Stacher (USA) | June 8, 1981 (aged 29) |
| Evelyn Stevens (USA) | May 9, 1983 (aged 27) |
| Carla Swart (Note: Swart died on 19 January 2011.) (RSA) | November 26, 1987 (aged 23) |
| Ina-Yoko Teutenberg (GER) | October 28, 1974 (aged 36) |
| Adrie Visser (NED) | October 19, 1983 (aged 27) |

== 2010 Team HTC-Columbia Women ==
Ages as of 1 January 2010.

| Rider | Date of birth |
|---|---|
| Kim Anderson (USA) | January 28, 1968 (aged 41) |
| Judith Arndt (GER) | July 23, 1976 (aged 33) |
| Noemi Cantele (SWE) | July 17, 1981 (aged 28) |
| Ellen van Dijk (NED) | February 11, 1987 (aged 22) |
| Emilia Fahlin (SWE) | October 24, 1988 (aged 21) |
| Chloe Hosking (AUS) | October 1, 1990 (aged 19) |

| Rider | Date of birth |
|---|---|
| Luise Keller (GER) | March 8, 1984 (aged 25) |
| Evelyn Stevens (USA) | May 9, 1983 (aged 26) |
| Ina-Yoko Teutenberg (GER) | October 28, 1974 (aged 35) |
| Linda Villumsen (NZL) | April 9, 1985 (aged 24) |
| Adrie Visser (NED) | October 19, 1983 (aged 26) |

== 2009 Team Columbia-High Road Women, Team Columbia-HTC Women ==
Ages as of 1 January 2009.

| Rider | Date of birth |
|---|---|
| Mara Abbott (USA) | November 14, 1985 (aged 23) |
| Kim Anderson (USA) | January 28, 1968 (aged 40) |
| Judith Arndt (GER) | July 23, 1976 (aged 32) |
| Kate Bates (AUS) | May 18, 1982 (aged 26) |
| Chantal Beltman (NED) | August 26, 1976 (aged 32) |
| Ellen van Dijk (NED) | February 11, 1987 (aged 21) |

| Rider | Date of birth |
|---|---|
| Emilia Fahlin (SWE) | October 24, 1988 (aged 20) |
| Luise Keller (GER) | March 8, 1984 (aged 24) |
| Maria Mendel (GER) | September 30, 1987 (aged 21) |
| Ina-Yoko Teutenberg (GER) | October 28, 1974 (aged 34) |
| Linda Villumsen Serup (DEN) | April 9, 1985 (aged 23) |
| Alexandra Wrubleski (CAN) | May 31, 1984 (aged 24) |

== 2008 Team High Road Women, Team Columbia Women ==
Ages as of 1 January 2008.

| Rider | Date of birth |
|---|---|
| Mara Abbott (USA) | November 14, 1985 (aged 22) |
| Kim Anderson (USA) | January 28, 1968 (aged 39) |
| Judith Arndt (GER) | July 23, 1976 (aged 31) |
| Kate Bates (AUS) | May 18, 1982 (aged 25) |
| Chantal Beltman (NED) | August 26, 1976 (aged 31) |
| Emilia Fahlin (SWE) | October 24, 1988 (aged 19) |
| Luise Keller (GER) | March 8, 1984 (aged 23) |

| Rider | Date of birth |
|---|---|
| Alex Rhodes (AUS) | December 1, 1984 (aged 23) |
| Madeleine Sandig (GER) | August 12, 1983 (aged 24) |
| Ina-Yoko Teutenberg (GER) | October 28, 1974 (aged 33) |
| Linda Villumsen Serup (DEN) | April 9, 1985 (aged 22) |
| Anke Wichmann (GER) | August 28, 1975 (aged 32) |
| Oenone Wood (AUS) | September 24, 1980 (aged 27) |

== 2007 T-Mobile Women ==
Ages as of 1 January 2007.

| Rider | Date of birth |
|---|---|
| Kim Anderson (USA) | January 28, 1968 (aged 38) |
| Judith Arndt (GER) | July 23, 1976 (aged 30) |
| Kate Bates (AUS) | May 18, 1982 (aged 24) |
| Chantal Beltman (NED) | August 26, 1976 (aged 30) |
| Emilia Fahlin (SWE) | October 24, 1988 (aged 18) |
| Suzanne de Goede (NED) | April 16, 1984 (aged 22) |

| Rider | Date of birth |
|---|---|
| Alex Rhodes (AUS) | December 1, 1984 (aged 22) |
| Ina-Yoko Teutenberg (GER) | October 28, 1974 (aged 32) |
| Linda Villumsen (DEN) | April 9, 1985 (aged 21) |
| Anke Wichmann (GER) | August 28, 1975 (aged 31) |
| Oenone Wood (AUS) | September 24, 1980 (aged 26) |

== 2006 T-Mobile Women ==
Ages as of 1 January 2006.

| Rider | Date of birth |
|---|---|
| Kim Anderson (USA) | January 28, 1968 (aged 37) |
| Judith Arndt (GER) | July 23, 1976 (aged 29) |
| Christina Becker (GER) | December 12, 1977 (aged 28) |
| Lyne Bessette (CAN) | March 10, 1975 (aged 30) |
| Kimberly Bruckner Baldwin (USA) | June 19, 1970 (aged 35) |

| Rider | Date of birth |
|---|---|
| Mari Holden Paulsen (USA) | March 30, 1971 (aged 34) |
| Magali Le Floch (FRA) | August 17, 1975 (aged 30) |
| Amy Moore (CAN) | December 17, 1973 (aged 32) |
| Rebecca Much (USA) | February 25, 1986 (aged 19) |
| Ina-Yoko Teutenberg (GER) | October 28, 1974 (aged 31) |

== 2005 Team T-Mobile Women ==
Ages as of 1 January 2005.

| Rider | Date of birth |
|---|---|
| Kristin Armstrong (USA) | August 11, 1973 (aged 31) |
| Kimberly Bruckner Baldwin (USA) | June 19, 1970 (aged 34) |
| Mari Holden Paulsen (USA) | March 30, 1971 (aged 33) |
| Lara Kroepsh (USA) | November 27, 1978 (aged 26) |

| Rider | Date of birth |
|---|---|
| Rebecca Much (USA) | February 25, 1986 (aged 18) |
| Brooke Ourada (USA) | June 2, 1977 (aged 27) |
| Kori Seehafer (USA) | April 30, 1975 (aged 29) |
| Ina-Yoko Teutenberg (GER) | October 28, 1974 (aged 30) |

== 2004 Team T-Mobile Women ==
Ages as of 1 January 2004.

| Rider | Date of birth |
|---|---|
| Kim Anderson (USA) | January 28, 1968 (aged 35) |
| Kristin Armstrong (USA) | August 11, 1973 (aged 30) |
| Dotsie Bausch (USA) | March 6, 1973 (aged 30) |
| Kimberly Bruckner Baldwin (USA) | June 19, 1970 (aged 33) |
| Deirdre Demet-Barry (USA) | October 8, 1972 (aged 31) |
| Lynn Gaggioli-Brotzman (USA) | September 12, 1976 (aged 27) |

| Rider | Date of birth |
|---|---|
| Mari Holden Paulsen (USA) | March 30, 1971 (aged 32) |
| Lara Kroepsh (USA) | November 27, 1978 (aged 25) |
| Tanya Lindenmuth (USA) | May 9, 1979 (aged 24) |
| Amber Neben (USA) | February 18, 1975 (aged 28) |
| Stacey Peters (USA) | July 1, 1969 (aged 34) |

== 2003 Team T-Mobile ==
Ages as of 1 January 2003.

| Rider | Date of birth |
|---|---|
| Kim Anderson (USA) | January 28, 1968 (aged 34) |
| Kristin Armstrong (USA) | August 11, 1973 (aged 29) |
| Dotsie Bausch (USA) | March 6, 1973 (aged 29) |
| Katrina Berger-Grove (USA) | April 9, 1974 (aged 28) |
| Kimberly Bruckner Baldwin (USA) | June 19, 1970 (aged 32) |
| Deirdre Demet-Barry (USA) | October 8, 1972 (aged 30) |

| Rider | Date of birth |
|---|---|
| Sarah Hammer (USA) | August 18, 1983 (aged 19) |
| Mari Holden Paulsen (USA) | March 30, 1971 (aged 31) |
| Kristin Johnson (USA) | December 31, 1980 (aged 22) |
| Lara Kroepsh (USA) | November 27, 1978 (aged 24) |
| Amber Neben (USA) | February 18, 1975 (aged 27) |
| Stacey Peters (USA) | July 1, 1969 (aged 33) |

== See also ==
- Team Specialized-lululemon

Men's team riders

- List of HTC-Highroad riders

List of UCI women's teams riders

- List of Boels Dolmans Cycling Team riders
- List of Parkhotel Valkenburg Continental Team riders
- List of Team Giant-Shimano riders
- List of Specialized–lululemon riders
- List of Vrienden van het Platteland riders
