= Céline Van Severen =

Belgian cyclist

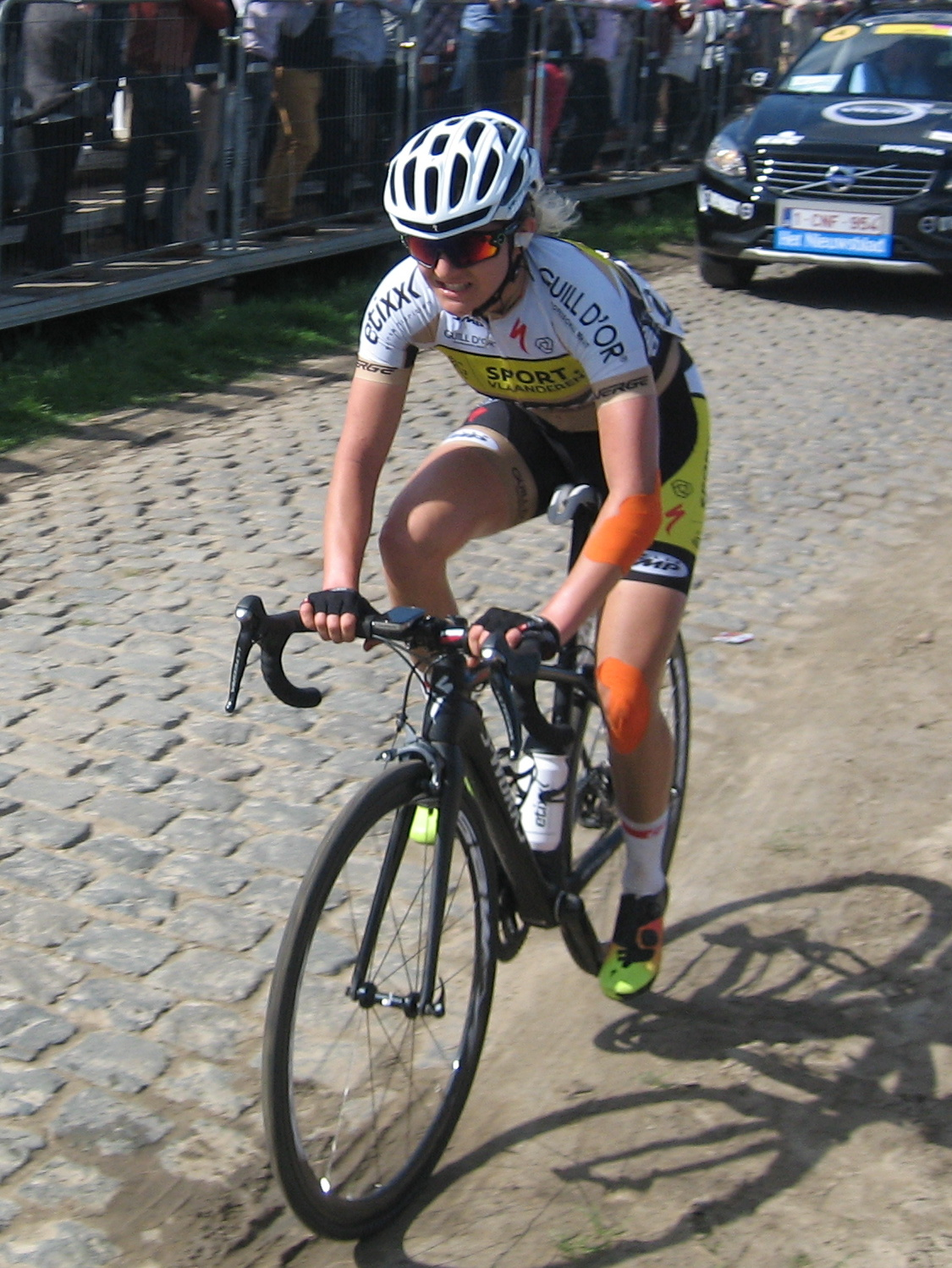
- Van Severen at the 2017 Tour of Flanders

Personal information
- Born: 17 September 1993 (age 33) Tielt, Belgium

Cycling career
- Sport: Cycling
- Current team: Retired
- Discipline: Road
- Role: Rider

Professional teams
- 2012: Sengers Ladies Cycling Team
- 2013–2014: Lotto–Belisol Ladies
- 2015: Lensworld.eu–Zannata
- 2017: Sport Vlaanderen–Etixx

Céline Van Severen (born 17 September 1993) is a Belgian former professional racing cyclist. She competed in the 2013 UCI women's road race in Florence. In 2013, Van Severen finished tenth in the Belgium Tour, and in 2015, she finished tenth in the Novilon EDR Cup.

== See also ==
- 2012 Sengers Ladies Cycling Team season
