= 2015 Ronde van Drenthe =

2015 Novilon EDR Cup
Race details
- Dates: 15 March 2015
- Stages: 1
- Distance: 139.5 km (86.68 mi)
- Winning time: 3h 14' 24"

Results
	Winner	Kirsten Wild (NED)	(Team Hitec Products)
	Second	Chloe Hosking (AUS)	(Wiggle–Honda)
	Third	Christine Majerus (LUX)	(Boels–Dolmans)

The 2015 Novilon EDR Cup was a bicycle race in the Netherlands, which formed part of the Dutch one day women's elite race season. It was held on 15 March 2015 over a distance of 134.5 kilometres (83.6 miles). It was rated by the UCI as a 1.2 category race. The race was won in a sprint finish by Kirsten Wild (Team Hitec Products), ahead of Chloe Hosking (Wiggle–Honda) and Christine Majerus (Boels–Dolmans).

== Results ==
Result
Rank	Rider	Team	Time
1	Kirsten Wild (NED)	Team Hitec Products	3h 14' 24"
2	Chloe Hosking (AUS)	Wiggle–Honda	+ 0"
3	Christine Majerus (LUX)	Boels–Dolmans	+ 0"
4	Amy Pieters (NED)	Team Liv–Plantur	+ 0"
5	Barbara Guarischi (ITA)	Velocio–SRAM	+ 0"
6	Marta Tagliaferro (ITA)	Alé–Cipollini	+ 0"
7	Simona Frapporti (ITA)	Alé–Cipollini	+ 0"
8	Mia Radotić (CRO)	BTC City Ljubljana	+ 0"
9	Lotta Lepistö (FIN)	Bigla Pro Cycling Team	+ 0"
10	Céline Van Severen (BEL)	Lensworld.eu–Zannata	+ 0"

== See also ==
- 2015 in women's road cycling
