= 2012 Open de Suède Vårgårda TTT =

2012 Open de Suède Vårgårda team time trial
2012 UCI Women's Road World Cup, race 6 of 8

Race details
- Dates: 17 August 2012
- Stages: 1
- Distance: 42.5 km (26.41 mi)
- Winning time: 52' 58"

Results
| | Winner | Team Specialized–lululemon |
| | Second | Orica–AIS |
| | Third | Rabobank Women Cycling Team |

The 2012 Open de Suède Vårgårda – team time trial was the 5th team time trial running on the Open de Suède Vårgårda. It was held on 17 August 2012 over a distance of 42.5 kilometres (26.4 miles) and was the sixth race of the 2012 UCI Women's Road World Cup season.

== Results (top 10) ==
| | Team | Cyclists | Time |
|---|---|---|---|
| 1 | Team Specialized–lululemon | Trixi Worrack (GER); Amber Neben (USA); Evelyn Stevens (USA); Ina Teutenberg (GER); Ellen van Dijk (NED) (+ 41"); Charlotte Becker (GER) (+ 4' 58") | 52' 58" |
| 2 | Orica–AIS | Judith Arndt (GER); Shara Gillow (AUS); Claudia Häusler (GER); Linda Villumsen (NZL); Loes Gunnewijk (NED) (+ 2"); Alexis Rhodes (AUS) (+ 10' 09") | + 29" |
| 3 | Rabobank Women Cycling Team | Tatiana Antoshina (RUS); Thalita de Jong (NED); Iris Slappendel (NED); Marianne Vos (NED); Liesbet De Vocht (BEL) (+ 5' 48"); Roxane Knetemann (NED) (DNF) | + 1' 50" |
| 4 | AA Drink–leontien.nl | Emma Pooley (GBR); Sharon Laws (GBR); Shelley Olds (USA); Kirsten Wild (NED); Lucinda Brand (NED) (+ 2"); Jessie Daams (NED) (+ 10' 53") | + 2' 45" |
| 5 | RusVelo | Irina Molicheva (RUS); Hanka Kupfernagel (GER); Romy Kasper (GER); Alina Bondarenko (RUS); Natalia Boyarskaya (RUS) (+ 1' 12") | + 3' 21" |
| 6 | Dolmans–Boels cyclingteam | Laura van der Kamp (NED); Anouska Koster (NED); Mascha Pijnenborg (NED); Emma Trott (GBR); Nina Kessler (NED); Janneke Ensing (NED) (+ 4") | + 5' 11" |
| 7 | Skil–Argos | Kelly Markus (NED); Amy Pieters (NED); Monique van de Ree (NED); Esra Tromp (NED); Janneke Kanis (NED) (DNF) | + 6' 03" |
| 8 | Team Ibis Cycles | Natalie van Gogh (NED); Eileen Roe (GBR); Julie Leth (DEN); Esther Olthuis (NED); Aafke Eshuis (NED) (+ 1' 53"); Martina Thomasson (SWE) (+ 2' 05") | + 6' 05" |
| 9 | Hitec Products–Mistral Home | Emilie Moberg (NOR); Lise Nøstvold (NOR); Thea Thorsen (NOR); Marie Voreland (NOR); Cecilie s Johansen (NOR) (DNF); Tone Hatteland Lima (SWE) (DNF) | + 6' 12" |
| 10 | Denmark | Mette Fugl Rusmussen (DEN); Catrine Grage (DEN); Fie Degn Larsen (DEN); Nina Schultz Nielsen (DEN); Britt Lauenborg (DEN) (DNF) | + 6' 30" |

^{DNF = did not finish}

Results from worldcupvargarda.se.
