= Claudia Koster =

Dutch cyclist (born 1992)

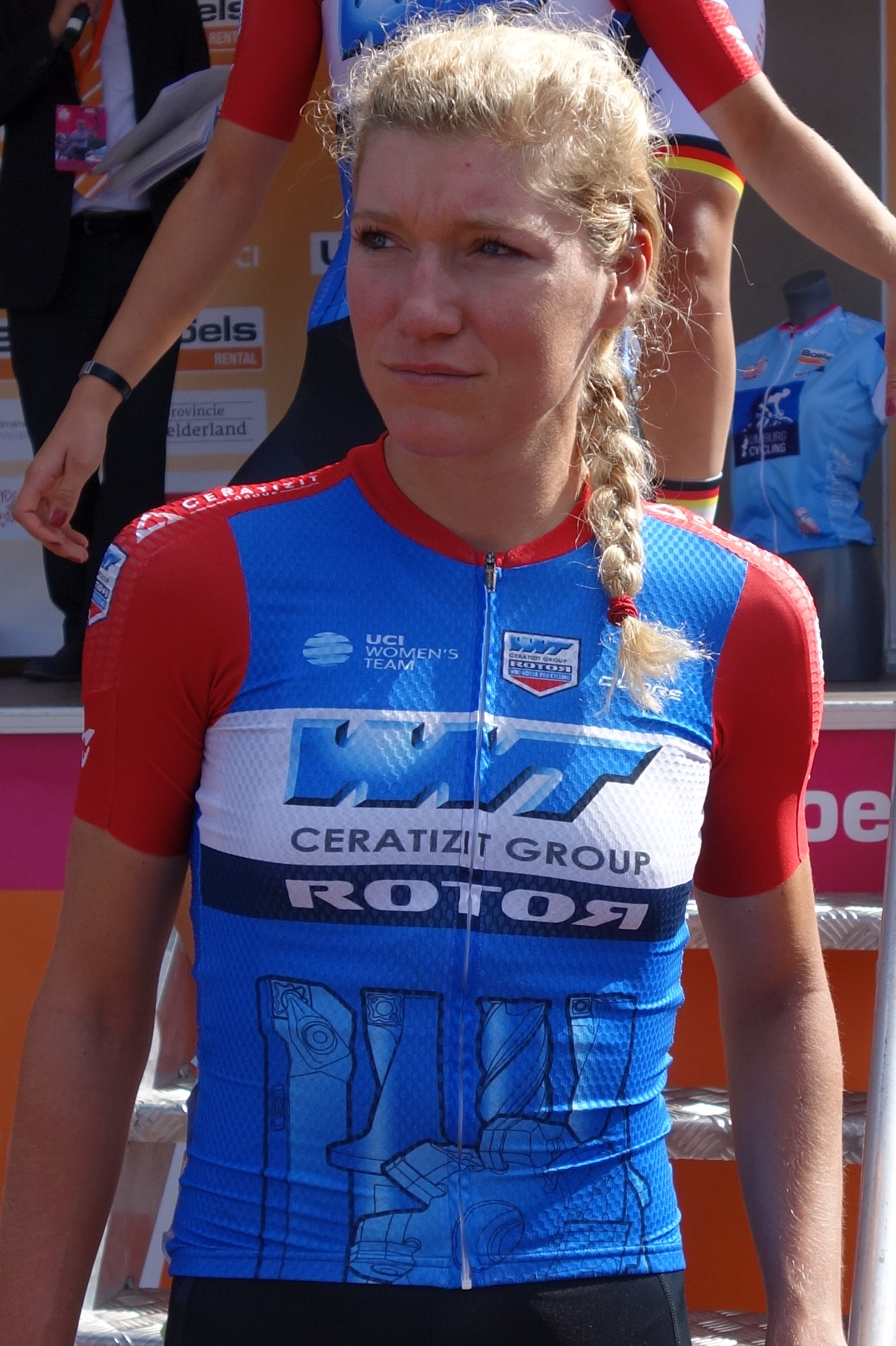
- Koster at the 2019 Holland Ladies Tour

Personal information
- Full name: Claudia Koster
- Born: 22 March 1992 (age 34) Wormerveer, Netherlands

Cycling career
- Sport: Cycling
- Current team: Hitec Products–Fluid Control
- Discipline: Road
- Role: Rider
- Rider type: All-rounder

Amateur teams
- 2011: Sengers Ladies
- 2013: Parkhotel Valkenburg Cycling Team
- 2014: Team DAK Plusine ICT
- 2016: RC Jan van Arckel
- 2018: Team OnForm (guest)

Professional teams
- 2012: Sengers Ladies Cycling Team
- 2017–2018: Team VéloCONCEPT
- 2019–2020: WNT–Rotor Pro Cycling
- 2021–: Team Hitec Products

Claudia Koster (born 22 March 1992) is a Dutch road cyclist, who currently rides for UCI Women's Continental Team Hitec Products–Fluid Control. She participated at the 2012 UCI Road World Championships in the Women's team time trial for the Sengers Ladies Cycling Team.
