= List of Vrienden van het Platteland riders =

The List of Vrienden van het Platteland contains riders from the Vrienden van het Platteland team which have had the name Ondernemers van Nature-Vrienden van het Platteland in 2004.

== 2008 Vrienden van het Platteland ==
Ages as of 1 January 2008.

Rider	Date of birth
Liesbeth Bakker (NED)	July 1, 1986 (aged 21)
Martine Bras (NED)	May 17, 1987 (aged 20)
Nikki Butterfield-Egyed (AUS)	April 12, 1982 (aged 25)
Ellen van Dijk (NED)	February 11, 1987 (aged 20)
Lorian Graham (AUS)	November 8, 1977 (aged 30)
Yvonne Hijgenaar (NED)	May 15, 1980 (aged 27)
Marit Huisman (NED)	March 1, 1989 (aged 18)
Willy Kanis (NED)	July 27, 1984 (aged 23)
Roxane Knetemann (NED)	April 1, 1987 (aged 20)

Rider	Date of birth
Kristy Miggels (NED)	August 6, 1980 (aged 27)
Tina Pic (USA)	May 9, 1966 (aged 41)
Martine van der Herberg (NED)	November 24, 1989 (aged 18)
An Van Rie (BEL)	June 9, 1974 (aged 33)
Annemiek van Vleuten (NED)	October 8, 1982 (aged 25)
Monique Verstraten (NED)	April 24, 1983 (aged 24)
Liesbet De Vocht (BEL)	January 5, 1979 (aged 28)
Jaccolien Wallaard (NED)	September 30, 1982 (aged 25)

Guest riders

The team had Felicia Gomez and Linn Torp as guest riders during the Tour of New Zealand and Gomez also during the Geelong Tour.

== 2007 Vrienden van het Platteland ==
Ages as of 1 January 2007.

Rider	Date of birth
Liesbeth Bakker (NED)	July 1, 1986 (aged 20)
Janne Brok (NED)	June 7, 1987 (aged 19)
Katie Brown (AUS)	February 2, 1983 (aged 23)
Ellen van Dijk (NED)	February 11, 1987 (aged 19)
Yvonne Leezer (NED)	February 9, 1987 (aged 19)
Emma Mackie (AUS)	September 9, 1984 (aged 22)

Rider	Date of birth
Anita Valen (NOR)	December 12, 1968 (aged 38)
Monique van de Ree (NED)	March 2, 1988 (aged 18)
Moniek Rotmensen (NED)	April 25, 1986 (aged 20)
Monique Verstraten (NED)	April 24, 1983 (aged 23)
Jaccolien Wallaard (NED)	September 30, 1982 (aged 24)

== 2006 Vrienden van het Platteland ==
Ages as of 1 January 2006.

Rider	Date of birth
Chantal Beltman (NED)	August 25, 1976 (aged 29)
Janne Brok (NED)	June 7, 1987 (aged 18)
Ellen van Dijk (NED)	February 11, 1987 (aged 18)
Sharon van Essen (NED)	March 3, 1981 (aged 24)
Corrien van Haastert (NED)	February 11, 1982 (aged 23)
Esther van der Helm (NED)	September 5, 1981 (aged 24)

Rider	Date of birth
Yvonne Leezer (NED)	February 9, 1987 (aged 18)
Moniek Rotmensen (NED)	April 25, 1986 (aged 19)
Iris Slappendel (NED)	February 18, 1985 (aged 20)
Monique Verstraten (NED)	April 24, 1983 (aged 22)
Heidi de Voogd (NED)	January 9, 1980 (aged 25)

== 2005 Vrienden van het Platteland ==
Ages as of 1 January 2005.

Rider	Date of birth
Chantal Beltman (NED)	August 25, 1976 (aged 28)
Andrea Bosman (NED)	August 6, 1979 (aged 25)
Minke van Dongen (NED)	January 19, 1983 (aged 21)
Sharon van Essen (NED)	March 3, 1981 (aged 23)
Loes Gunnewijk (NED)	November 27, 1980 (aged 24)

Rider	Date of birth
Corrien van Haastert (NED)	February 11, 1982 (aged 22)
Esther van der Helm (NED)	September 5, 1981 (aged 23)
Aukje de Koning (NED)	January 29, 1980 (aged 24)
Kristy Miggels (NED)	August 6, 1980 (aged 24)
Iris Slappendel (NED)	February 18, 1985 (aged 19)

== 2004 Ondernemers van Nature-Vrienden van het Platteland ==
Ages as of 1 January 2004.

Rider	Date of birth
Chantal Beltman (NED)	August 25, 1976 (aged 27)
Andrea Bosman (NED)	August 6, 1979 (aged 24)
Minke van Dongen (NED)	January 19, 1983 (aged 20)
Sharon van Essen (NED)	March 3, 1981 (aged 22)
Loes Gunnewijk (NED)	November 27, 1980 (aged 23)

Rider	Date of birth
Corrien van Haastert (NED)	February 11, 1982 (aged 21)
Vera Koedooder (NED)	October 31, 1983 (aged 20)
Marije Profijt (NED)	January 31, 1985 (aged 18)
Kristy Miggels (NED)	August 6, 1980 (aged 23)
Iris Slappendel (NED)	February 18, 1985 (aged 18)

== Multiple years in the team ==
Years	Name and country	Season
3	Ellen van Dijk (NED)	2006, 2007, 2008
3	Chantal Beltman (NED)	2004, 2005, 2006
3	Sharon van Essen (NED)	2004, 2005, 2006
3	Iris Slappendel (NED)	2004, 2005, 2006
3	Monique Verstraten (NED)	2006, 2007, 2008
2	Liesbeth Bakker (NED)	2007, 2008
2	Andrea Bosman (NED)	2004, 2005
2	Janne Brok (NED)	2006, 2007
2	Minke van Dongen (NED)	2004, 2005
2	Corrien van Haastert (NED)	2005, 2006
2	Esther van der Helm (NED)	2005, 2006
2	Yvonne Leezer (NED)	2006, 2007
2	Kristy Miggels (NED)	2004, 2008
2	Jaccolien Wallaard (NED)	2007, 2008

== See also ==
- Vrienden van het Platteland

List of UCI women's teams riders

- List of Boels Dolmans Cycling Team riders
- List of Parkhotel Valkenburg Continental Team riders
- List of Team Giant-Shimano riders
- List of Specialized–lululemon riders
- List of Vrienden van het Platteland riders
