= Cramo Go:green =

Swedish cycling team

Team information
- UCI code: ALR (2008–2009); AGG (2010–2013)
- Registered: Sweden
- Founded: 2008
- Disbanded: 2013
- Discipline: Road
- Status: UCI Women's Team (2010–2013)
- Bicycles: Trek (2010–2011); Alriksson (2012); Lapierre (2013)

Key personnel
- General manager: Martin Alriksson
- Team manager: Martin Vestby

Team name history
- 2008-2009 2010-2012 2013: Alriksson Cycle Team; Alriksson - Go:Green; Cramo - Go:Green

Cramo Go:green (UCI code AGG) was a professional women's cycling team, based in Sweden, which competed in elite road bicycle racing events such as the UCI Women's Road World Cup.

== Major wins ==
2010
Linköping, Madelene Olsson
Overall Wänershofs 2-dages, Malin Rydlund

Stage 2 Malin Rydlund

Overall Silkeborg Viborg Hammel, Jennie Stenerhag

Stage 1, Madelene Olsson
Stages 2 & 3, Jennie Stenerhag

Distriktsmesterskab Time Trial Championships, Henriette Lygum Christensen

== Roster ==
2013 roster. Ages as of 1 January 2013.

Rider	Date of birth
Jessica Bjelkmark (SWE)	June 11, 1989 (aged 23)
Mirella Ehrin (SWE)	August 19, 1976 (aged 36)
Hanna Helamb (SWE)	March 30, 1994 (aged 18)
Alexandra Nessmar (SWE)	June 23, 1994 (aged 18)
Hanna Nilsson (SWE)	February 16, 1992 (aged 20)

Rider	Date of birth
Johanna Nilsson (SWE)	November 21, 1990 (aged 22)
Madelene Olsson (SWE)	November 14, 1982 (aged 30)
Linnea Sjöblom (SWE)	November 12, 1989 (aged 23)
Isabelle Söderberg (SWE)	May 28, 1989 (aged 23)
Martina Thomasson (SWE)	February 22, 1985 (aged 27)

== National champions ==
2009
Sweden Road Race, Jennie Stenerhag
