= Birgit Lavrijssen =

Dutch cyclist (born 1991)

Personal information
- Born: 16 January 1991 (age 35) Maastricht, Netherlands

Cycling career
- Sport: Cycling
- Discipline: Road cycling

Professional teams
- 2011: Dolmans Landscaping Team
- 2012–2013: Sengers Ladies Cycling Team

Birgit Lavrijssen (born 16 January 1991) is a road cyclist from the Netherlands. She participated at the 2012 UCI Road World Championships in the Women's team time trial for the Sengers Ladies Cycling Team. A month earlier she won the second stage and team time trial of the Trophée d'Or Féminin with her teammates Evelyn Arys, Anna van der Breggen, Vera Koedooder, Geerike Schreurs and Karen Verhestraeten.
