= Isabelle Söderberg =

Swedish cyclist

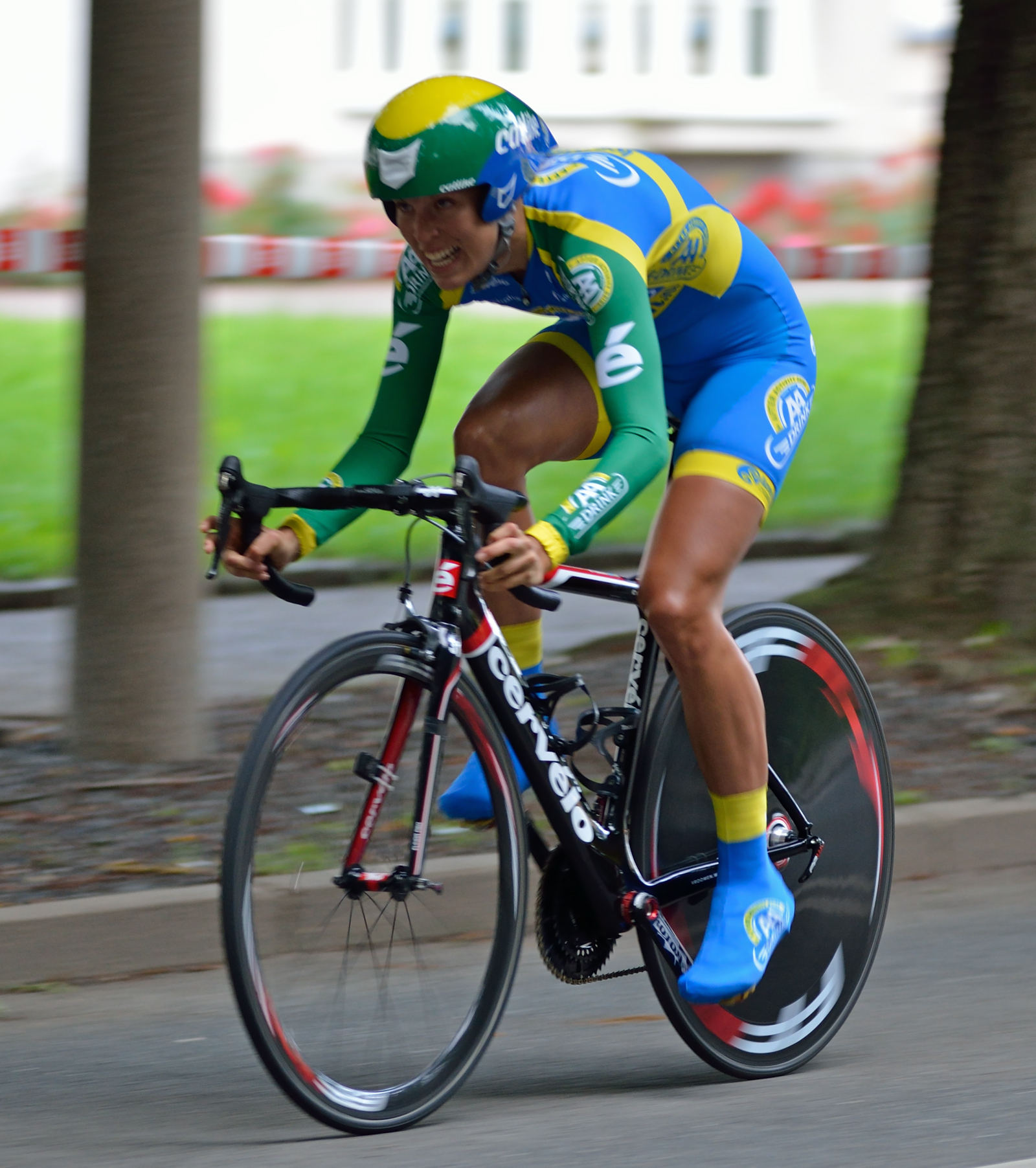

Personal information
- Nationality: Swedish
- Born: 28 May 1989 (age 35)

Sport
- Country: Sweden
- Sport: Cycling

Isabelle Söderberg (born 28 May 1989) is a Swedish professional racing cyclist. She competed at the 2012 Summer Olympics in the Women's road race.

== See also ==
- 2012 AA Drink-leontien.nl season
