= Geerike Schreurs =

Dutch cyclist

Personal information
- Born: 19 May 1989 (age 37) Zwolle, the Netherlands
- Height: 1.86 m (6 ft 1 in)

Cycling career
- Sport: Cycling
- Current team: Team SD Worx–Protime
- Disciplines: Road; Gravel

Professional teams
- 2011: Dolmans Landscaping Team
- 2012–2013: Sengers Ladies Cycling Team
- 2025–: Team SD Worx–Protime

Geerike Schreurs (born 19 May 1989 in Zwolle) is a Dutch road cyclist, who rides for UCI Women's WorldTeam Team SD Worx–Protime. She participated at the 2012 UCI Road World Championships in the Women's team time trial for the Sengers Ladies Cycling Team. A month earlier she won the second stage and team time trial of the Trophée d'Or Féminin with her teammates Evelyn Arys, Anna van der Breggen, Vera Koedooder, Birgit Lavrijssen and Karen Verhestraeten.

In 2023, she switched to gravel racing, finishing second at the Unbound Gravel 200 the following year. In 2025, she returned to road racing as well, joining Team SD Worx–Protime.

== Major results ==
2024
UCI Gravel World Series

1st The Gralloch

2nd Unbound Gravel 200
2nd The Traka 360
2nd Wörthersee Gravel Race
3rd The Rift
4th Overall Santa Vall

1st Stage 2

2025
UCI Gravel World Series

1st Wörthersee
1st Turnhout

2nd Overall Santa Vall
3rd The Hills
