= Martina Thomasson =

Swedish cyclist

Personal information
- Born: 22 February 1985 (age 41)

Cycling career
- Sport: Cycling
- Discipline: Road
- Role: Rider

Professional teams
- 2012: Team Ibis Cycles
- 2013: Cramo - Go:Green

Martina Thomasson (born 22 February 1985) is a Swedish racing cyclist. During the second round of the Swedish Cup in 2008, which was a 3-day cycling event in Borlänge, Thomasson placed second overall in the women's elite class. In 2011, she placed in two international cycling competitions, ranking 30th in a Belgium race and 4th in the Czech Republic. Her successes resulted in her being named to the Swedish World Cup cycling team that same year. She went on to be selected for the national team in 2013 and competed in the 2013 UCI women's road race in Florence.
