= 2012 UCI Women's Road World Rankings =

The 2012 UCI Women's Road Rankings is an overview of the final UCI Women's Road Rankings, based upon the results in all UCI-sanctioned races of the 2012 women's road cycling season.

== Summary ==
Top-ranked individual	Second-ranked individual	Third-ranked individual	Top-ranked team	Top-ranked nation
Marianne Vos (NED); Rabobank Women Cycling Team	Judith Arndt (GER); Orica–AIS	Emma Johansson (SWE); Hitec Products–Mistral Home Cycling Team	Rabobank Women Cycling Team	Netherlands

== Individual World Ranking (top 100) ==
	Cyclists	Nation	Team	Age	Points
1	Marianne Vos	Netherlands	RBW	25	1666
2	Judith Arndt	Germany	GEW	36	964.5
3	Emma Johansson	Sweden	HPU	29	885
4	Evelyn Stevens	United States	SLU	29	825
5	Amber Neben	United States	SLU	37	574
6	Ina Teutenberg	Germany	SLU	38	563
7	Annemiek van Vleuten	Netherlands	RBW	30	558
8	Trixi Worrack	Germany	SLU	31	512
9	Linda Villumsen	New Zealand	GEW	27	451.25
10	Shelley Olds	United States	LNL	32	393.75
11	Giorgia Bronzini	Italy	DPZ	29	387
12	Emma Pooley	Great Britain	LNL	30	381.5
13	Kirsten Wild	Netherlands	LNL	30	373.75
14	Lizzie Armitstead	Great Britain	LNL	24	365
15	Anna van der Breggen	Netherlands	SLT	22	360.67
16	Elisa Longo Borghini	Italy	HPU	21	340
17	Olga Zabelinskaya	Russia	RVL	32	330
18	Ashleigh Moolman	South Africa	LBL	27	318
19	Ellen van Dijk	Netherlands	SLU	25	317
20	Liesbet De Vocht	Belgium	RBW	33	317
21	Alena Amialiusik	Belarus	BPK	23	287
22	Monia Baccaille	Italy	MCG	28	280
23	Tatiana Guderzo	Italy	MCG	28	272.67
24	Chloe Hosking	Australia	SLU	22	262
25	Noemi Cantele	Italy	BPK	31	258
26	Adrie Visser	Netherlands	SKI	29	236.5
27	Clara Hughes	Canada	SLU	40	232
28	Hanka Kupfernagel	Germany	RVL	38	225.25
29	Rachel Neylan	Australia	NXX	30	221
30	Clemilda Fernandes Silva	Brazil		33	216
31	Kristin Armstrong	United States	EXG	39	212
32	Joëlle Numainville	Canada		25	212
33	Iris Slappendel	Netherlands	RBW	27	208
34	Melissa Hoskins	Australia	GEW	21	205
35	Rossella Ratto	Italy	GCV	19	200
36	Megan Guarnier	United States	TIB	27	195.67
37	Pauline Ferrand-Prévot	France	RBW	20	191.5
38	Rochelle Gilmore	Australia	FHT	31	187
39	Sharon Laws	Great Britain	LNL	38	182.5
40	Tiffany Cromwell	Australia	GEW	24	170
41	Carmen Small	United States		32	167
42	Evelyn García	El Salvador	BPK	30	159
43	Shara Gillow	Australia	GEW	25	152.75
44	Lucinda Brand	Netherlands	LNL	23	150
45	Małgorzata Jasińska	Poland	MCG	28	149.67
46	Charlotte Becker	Germany	SLU	29	149
47	Alyona Andruk	Ukraine	VAI	25	143
48	Loes Gunnewijk	Netherlands	GEW	32	135
49	Evelyn Arys	Belgium	KLT	22	132.67
50	Arlenis Sierra Cañadilla	Cuba		20	126
51	Wendy Houvenaghel	Great Britain		38	124
52	Yumari González Valdivieso	Cuba		33	109
53	Liu Xin	China	GPC	26	106
54	Aude Biannic	France		21	106
55	Edwige Pitel	France		45	103
56	Leah Kirchmann	Canada		22	102
57	Gracie Elvin	Australia	FHT	24	101
58	Jutatip Maneephan	Thailand		24	100
59	Claudia Häusler	Germany	GEW	27	99.5
60	Mayra Del Rocio Rocha	Mexico		24	98
61	Kristin McGrath	United States	EXG	30	98
62	Lauren Hall	United States	TIB	33	97.67
63	Ah Reum Na	South Korea		22	97
64	Christel Ferrier-Bruneau	France	HPU	33	91
65	Elena Cecchini	Italy	MCG	20	87.67
66	Angie González	Venezuela		31	86
67	Larisa Pankova	Russia		21	86
68	Mei Yu Hsiao	Chinese Taipei	ATT	27	85
69	Paulina Brzeźna	Poland		31	85
70	Emilie Moberg	Norway	HPU	21	84.25
71	Fabiana Luperini	Italy	FHT	38	83
72	Amy Pieters	Netherlands	SKI	21	82.25
73	Giada Borgato	Italy	DPZ	23	80
74	Marta Bastianelli	Italy	MCG	25	76
75	Christine Majerus	Luxembourg	GSD	25	75
76	Amanda Spratt	Australia	GEW	25	74
77	Kim de Baat	Netherlands		21	72
78	Janildes Fernandes Silva	Brazil		32	72
79	Barbara Guarischi	Italy	TOG	22	72
80	Katarzyna Pawłowska	Poland		23	70
81	Grete Treier	Estonia	MIC	35	69
82	Marta Tagliaferro	Italy	MCG	23	68.67
83	Carlee Taylor	Australia	FUT	23	67
84	Chantal Blaak	Netherlands	LNL	23	66.25
85	Audrey Cordon	France	FUT	23	66
86	Jessie Daams	Belgium	LNL	22	64.25
87	Romy Kasper	Germany	RVL	24	62.25
88	Danielys García	Venezuela		26	62
89	Laura van der Kamp	Netherlands		20	61
90	Martine Bras	Netherlands	DLT	34	61
91	Simona Frapporti	Italy	BPK	24	60
92	Amanda Miller	United States	TIB	26	59.67
93	Patricia Schwager	Switzerland	FCL	29	59
94	Lilibeth Chacón García	Venezuela	BPD	20	59
95	Carla Ryan	Australia	LNL	27	59
96	Inga Čilvinaitė	Lithuania	DPZ	26	58
97	Sarah Düster	Germany	RBW	30	58
98	Tatiana Antoshina	Russia	RBW	30	57
99	Alison Starnes	United States	EXG	27	56
100	Sofie De Vuyst	Belgium	LBL	25	54

== UCI Teams Ranking ==
This is the ranking of the UCI women's teams from 2012.

	Team	Nation	Points
1	Rabobank Women Cycling Team	Netherlands	2879
2	Team Specialized–lululemon	Germany	2674
3	Orica–AIS	Australia	1960.75
4	AA Drink–leontien.nl	Netherlands	1654
5	Hitec Products–Mistral Home Cycling Team	Norway	1490.25
6	Be Pink	Italy	874
7	MCipollini Giambenini	Italy	790.01
8	RusVelo	Russia	766.5
9	Lotto–Belisol Ladies	Belgium	546
10	Diadora–Pasta Zara	Italy	537
11	Exergy Twenty12	United States	413
12	Faren Honda Team	Italy	411
13	TIBCO-To The Top	United States	401.01
14	Skil 1t4i	Netherlands	386.25
15	Sengers Ladies Cycling Team	Belgium	381.34
16	S.C. Michela Fanini Rox	Italy	271
17	Abus–Nutrixxion	Germany	255
18	Vienne Futuroscope	France	223
19	Boels–Dolmans Cycling Team	Netherlands	222
20	Vaiano Tepso	Italy	216
21	Verinlegno–Fabiani	Italy	200
22	China Chongming–Giant Pro Cycling	Hong Kong, China	177
23	Topsport Vlaanderen–Ridley 2012	Belgium	164
24	Kleo Ladies Team	Belgium	147.67
25	Bizkaia–Durango	Spain	105
26	Axman Team Taiwan	Chinese Taipei	102
27	Team GSD Gestion	France	95
28	Forno d'Asolo Colavita	Italy	81
29	Fassa Bortolo–Servetto	Italy	81
30	Lointek	Spain	38
31	Alriksson–Go:Green	Sweden	32.25
32	Team Ibis Cycles	Great Britain	18
33	Asptt Dijon–Bourgogne	France	16
34	Team Bizhub–Fcf	South Africa	9
35	Scappa Speed Queens	Austria	5
36	Team Duedi–Biemme Metal	Colombia	3
-	Debabarrena–Gipuzkoa	Spain	

== Nations Ranking (top 50) ==
	Nation	Code	Points
1	Netherlands	NED	3275.42
2	Germany	GER	2413.75
3	United States	USA	2200.42
4	Italy	ITA	1537.67
5	Great Britain	GBR	1091
6	Australia	AUS	1045
7	Sweden	SWE	978.75
8	Canada	CAN	641
9	Belgium	BEL	615.92
10	France	FRA	557.5
11	Russia	RUS	547
12	New Zealand	NZL	516.25
13	South Africa	RSA	477
14	Brazil	BRA	347
15	Poland	POL	317.67
16	Belarus	BLR	309
17	Cuba	CUB	273
18	Venezuela	VEN	267
19	Ukraine	UKR	254
20	China	CHN	199
21	South Korea	KOR	195
22	El Salvador	ESA	186
23	Norway	NOR	172
24	Mexico	MEX	129
25	Lithuania	LTU	114
26	Thailand	THA	113
27	Switzerland	SUI	112
28	Chinese Taipei	TPE	102
29	Luxembourg	LUX	92
30	Estonia	EST	86
31	Austria	AUT	78
32	Azerbaijan	AZE	70
33	Hong Kong, China	HKG	69
34	Czech Republic	CZE	55
35	Finland	FIN	55
36	Denmark	DEN	50.5
37	Japan	JPN	46
38	Colombia	COL	39
39	Spain	ESP	37
40	Israel	ISR	30
40	Turkey	TUR	30
40	Costa Rica	CRC	30
40	Hungary	HUN	30
40	Malaysia	MAS	30
40	Greece	GRE	30
40	Ireland	IRL	30
47	Burkina Faso	BUR	30
48	Slovenia	SLO	25
48	Morocco	MAR	25
50	Serbia	SRB	23

Preceded by 2011	UCI Women's Road Rankings; 2012	Succeeded by 2013
