= Karen Verhestraeten =

Belgian cyclist

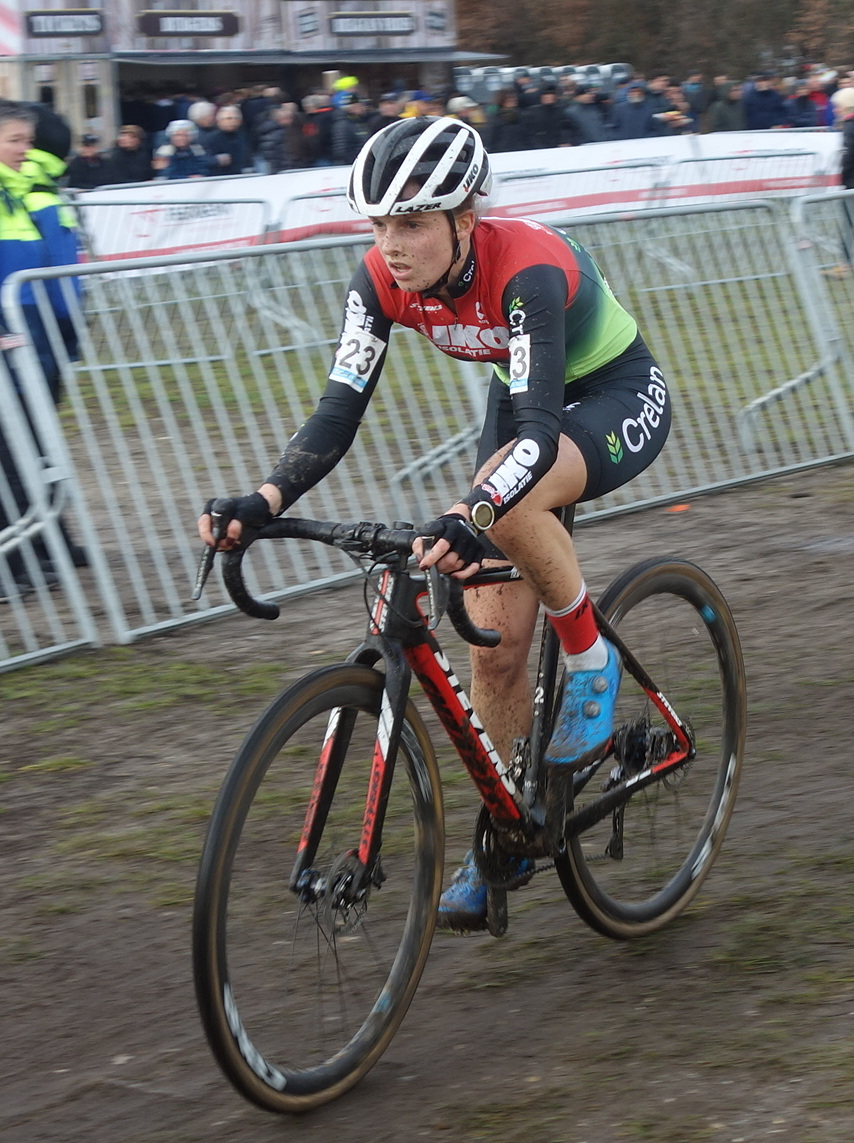
- Verhestraeten at the 2019 Cyclo-cross Zonhoven

Personal information
- Full name: Karen Verhestraeten
- Born: 23 April 1991 (age 35)

Cycling career
- Sport: Cycling
- Disciplines: Cyclo-cross; Road
- Role: Rider

Amateur teams
- 2015: Kleur Op Maat–Nodrugs
- 2017–2018: Donen–Vondelmolen CX
- 2019: Creafin–TÜV SÜD (cyclo-cross)
- 2019: Wielerclub De Sprinters Malderen (road)

Professional teams
- 2012–2013: Sengers Ladies Cycling Team
- 2016: Lares–Waowdeals
- 2019–2022: IKO–Crelan (cyclo-cross)
- 2020–2022: Ciclismo Mundial (road)

Karen Verhestraeten (born 23 April 1991) is a Belgian cyclist, who last competed in cyclo-cross for UCI Cyclo-cross Team IKO–Crelan, and in road cycling for UCI Women's Continental Team Plantur–Pura. She represented her nation in the women's elite event at the 2016 UCI Cyclo-cross World Championships in Heusden-Zolder.
