= Sharon Laws =

British racing cyclist (1974–2017)

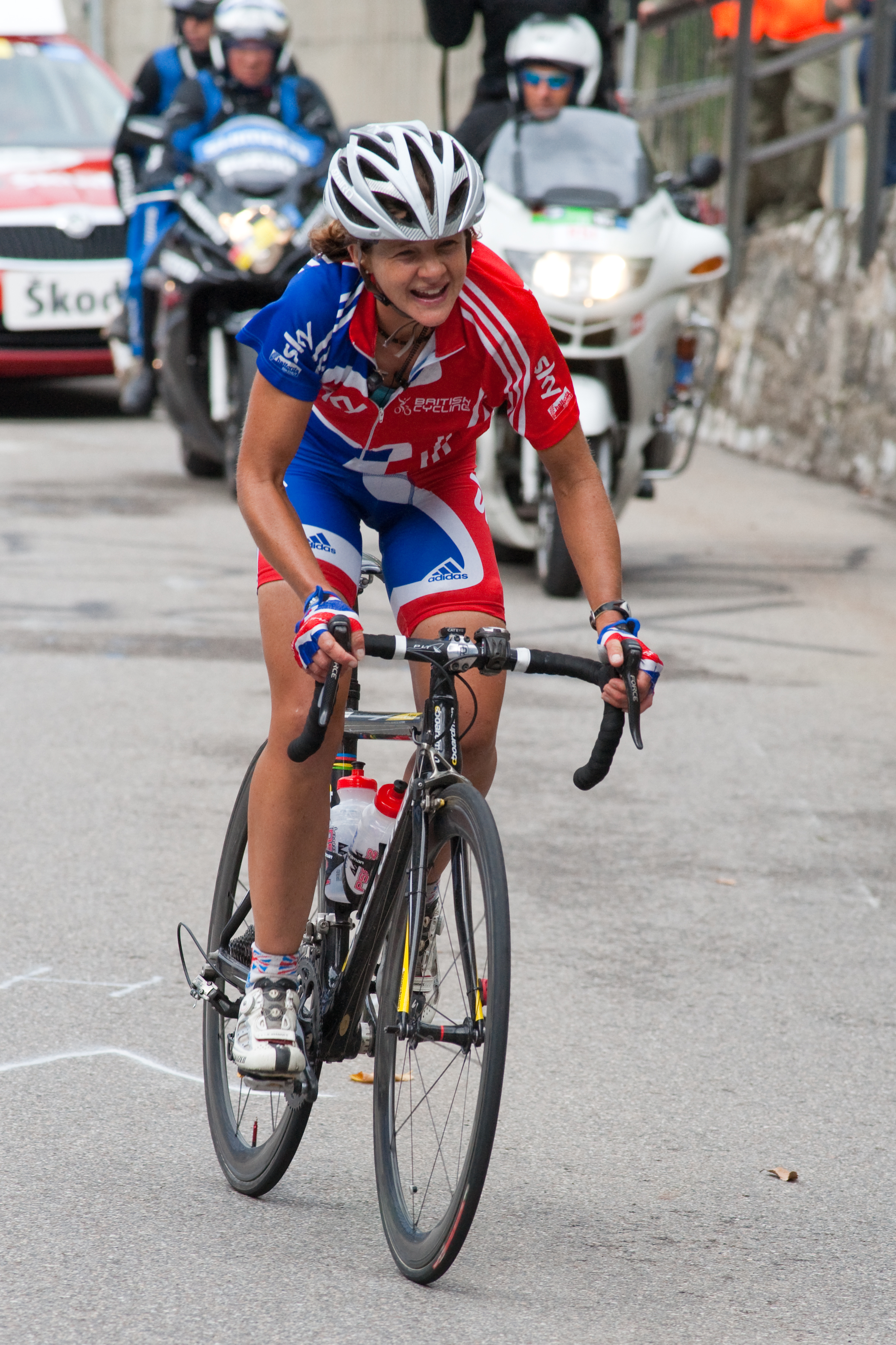
- Laws in the 2009 UCI Road World Championships in Mendrisio, Switzerland

Personal information
- Full name: Sharon Laws
- Born: 7 July 1974 Nairobi, Kenya
- Died: 16 December 2017 (aged 43)
- Height: 1.64 m (5 ft 5 in)
- Weight: 54 kg (119 lb; 8.5 st)

Cycling career
- Sport: Cycling
- Disciplines: Road & MTB
- Role: Rider

Professional teams
- 2008–2009: Team Halfords Bikehut
- 2010–2011: Garmin–Cervélo
- 2012: AA Drink–leontien.nl
- 2013: Lotto Belisol Ladies
- 2014: UnitedHealthcare
- 2015: Bigla
- 2016: Podium Ambition Pro Cycling

Major wins
- 2008 British National Time Trial Champion; 2012 British National Road Race Champion; 2004 Absa Cape Epic Women's Category; 2009 Absa Cape Epic Women's Category
Medal record
Representing AA Drink–leontien.nl
Women's road cycling
UCI Road World Championships
Bronze medal – third place	2012 Valkenburg	Team time trial

Sharon Laws (7 July 1974 – 16 December 2017) was a British professional cyclist and environmental consultant.

== Early life ==
Laws was born in Nairobi, Kenya, grew up in Bourton-on-the-Water, Gloucestershire and lived in Uganda, South Africa, Zimbabwe and the United Kingdom.

She gained an MSc in conservation and worked both before and during her cycling career as an environmental consultant to organisations including the British Government, the United Nations and for mining company Rio Tinto in Australia.

== Cycling career ==
Laws previously competed in adventure racing and endurance mountain biking. She won the eight-day Absa Cape Epic mountain-bike race in South Africa in 2004 with partner Hanlie Booyens. She then competed again with Booyens in the Women's Category in 2009, once again claiming 1st prize.

She began riding on the road to train for mountain biking and her form on the road was confirmed when she moved to Australia. She was approached to ride for Australia after coming second in the national championship in Ballarat, but the British official, Dave Brailsford, signed her for Team Halfords Bikehut. After turning professional at the age of 33, she made her base Girona, Spain, and undertook winter training in Stellenbosch, South Africa.

Her first victory in the team came was the Cheshire Classic stage race, which she won after coming second on the first and second stages. She got in the break on the first day in the Tour de l'Aude Cycliste Féminin but eased up on team orders to let Nicole Cooke catch the leaders. Cooke won the stage with Laws fifth. Laws crashed on the fifth stage but rejoined the peloton after a long chase. Her elbow needed a stitch but she could continue racing. She finished sixth overall.

Her addition to the British team, which included Cooke and Emma Pooley, was expected to improve chances of a medal in the 2008 Summer Olympics in Beijing but Laws crashed twice and came 35th of 62 finishers. Later in 2008 she won the British National Time Trial Championships.

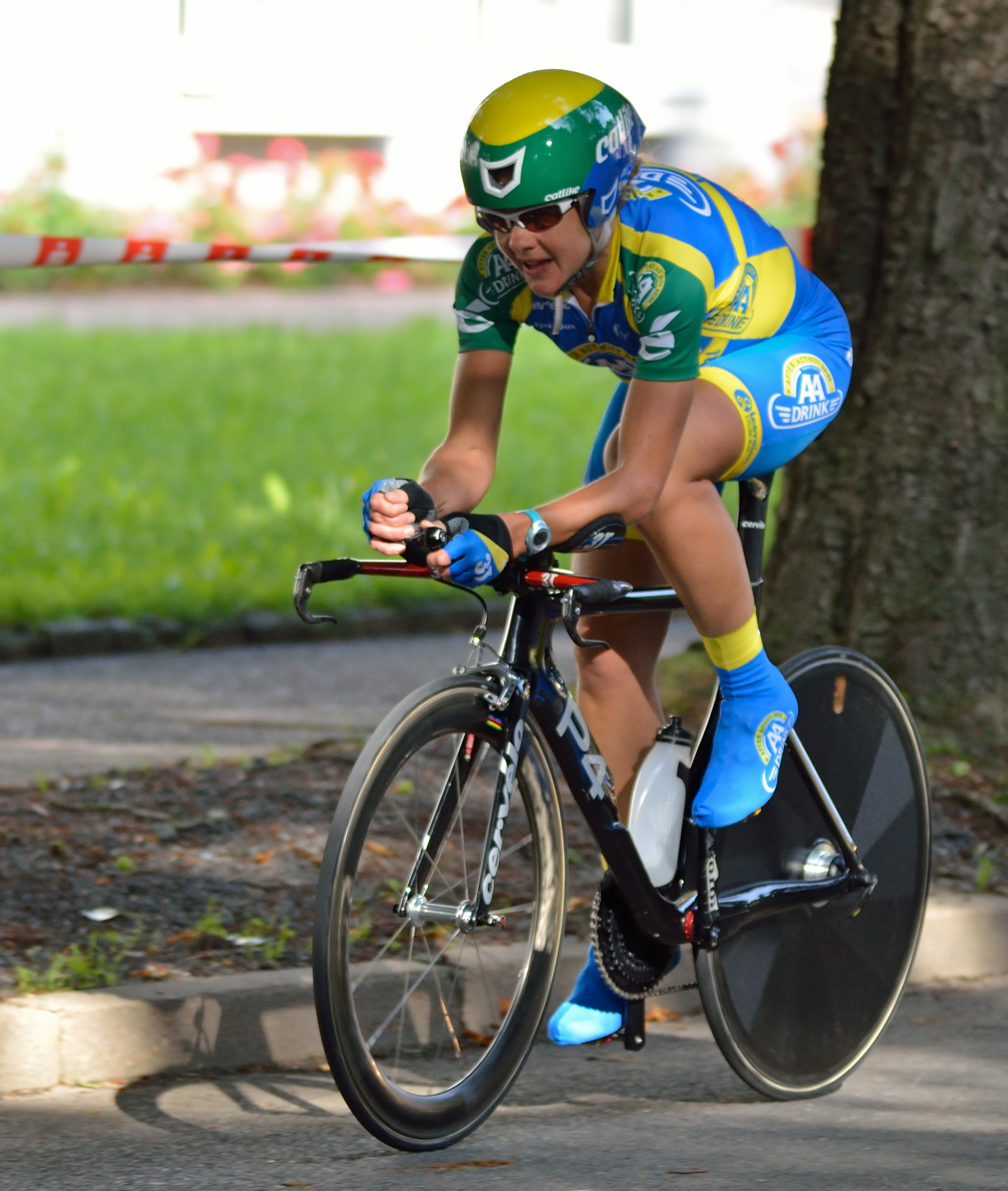
Laws at the 2012 Women's Tour of Thuringia

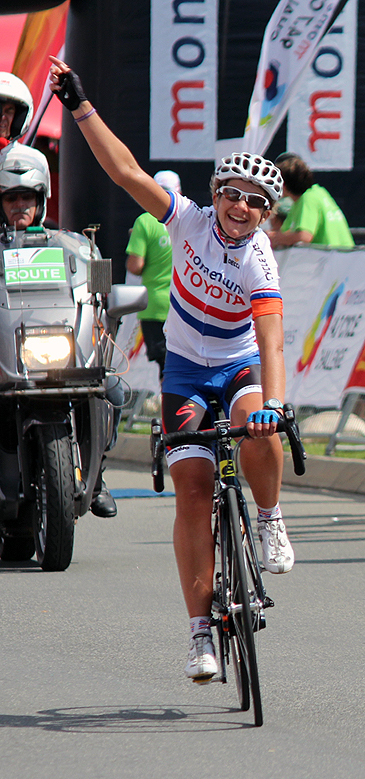
Laws winning the women's 2012 Momentum 94.7 Cycle Challenge

In 2012, she won the British National Road Race Championships.

In October 2015 she was announced as part of Podium Ambition Pro Cycling's squad for the 2016 season. Subsequently, in June 2016 she confirmed that she would retire from competition at the end of the season.

Laws was part of the ITV4 commentary team for the channel's coverage of the 2017 Women's Tour.

== Retirement and death ==
Laws retired from professional cycling in August 2016. In October 2016 Laws announced that she had been diagnosed with cervical cancer, for which she had started on a six-month course of chemotherapy. Laws died on 16 December 2017, aged 43.

== Major results ==
2004
1st, Women's Category, Absa Cape Epic, South Africa (8 day International MTB stage race)
8th Cape Argus Cycle Race, South Africa

2006
5th TransAlps (8 day MTB International stage race, female pair)
6th Grand Raid Crist Alp, Switzerland (MTB 130 km, elite women)

2007
1st Tour of Bright (road, elite women)
5th (fastest 22 km MTB leg) Anaconda Adventure Race (solo women)
1st Gravity 12 hour (MTB enduro, mixed pair)
2nd Chase the Sun 5 hour (MTB enduro, female solo)
3rd Tour of Coleraine (road, elite women)
1st Big Hill event (MTB enduro, elite women)
2nd Mars Challenge (21km run, 80 km ride, 30 km paddle, female solo)

2008 – Team Halfords Bikehut 2008 season
2nd Australian National Road Race Championships, Ballarat (AUS)
1st Cheshire Classic (GBR)

1st Stage 2, Cheshire Classic (GBR)

1st Olveston Women's Road Race (GBR)
1st British National Time Trial Championships

2009
1st, Women's Category, Absa Cape Epic
5th Australian National Road Race Championships, Ballarat (AUS)

2010
1st Stage 1, Tour de l'Aude Cycliste Féminin Team Time Trial
1st Stage 1, Tour Cycliste Féminin International

2012 – AA Drink-leontien.nl 2012 season
1st British National Road Race Championships
1st Momentum 94.7 Cycle Challenge, South Africa
3rd Team time trial, 2012 UCI Road World Championships

2014
1st Mountains classification The Women's Tour

2016
1st Overall Pirineus 3-day Mountain Bike Race
3rd Overall Alpentour Trophy
