= Esra Tromp =

Dutch cyclist (born 1990)

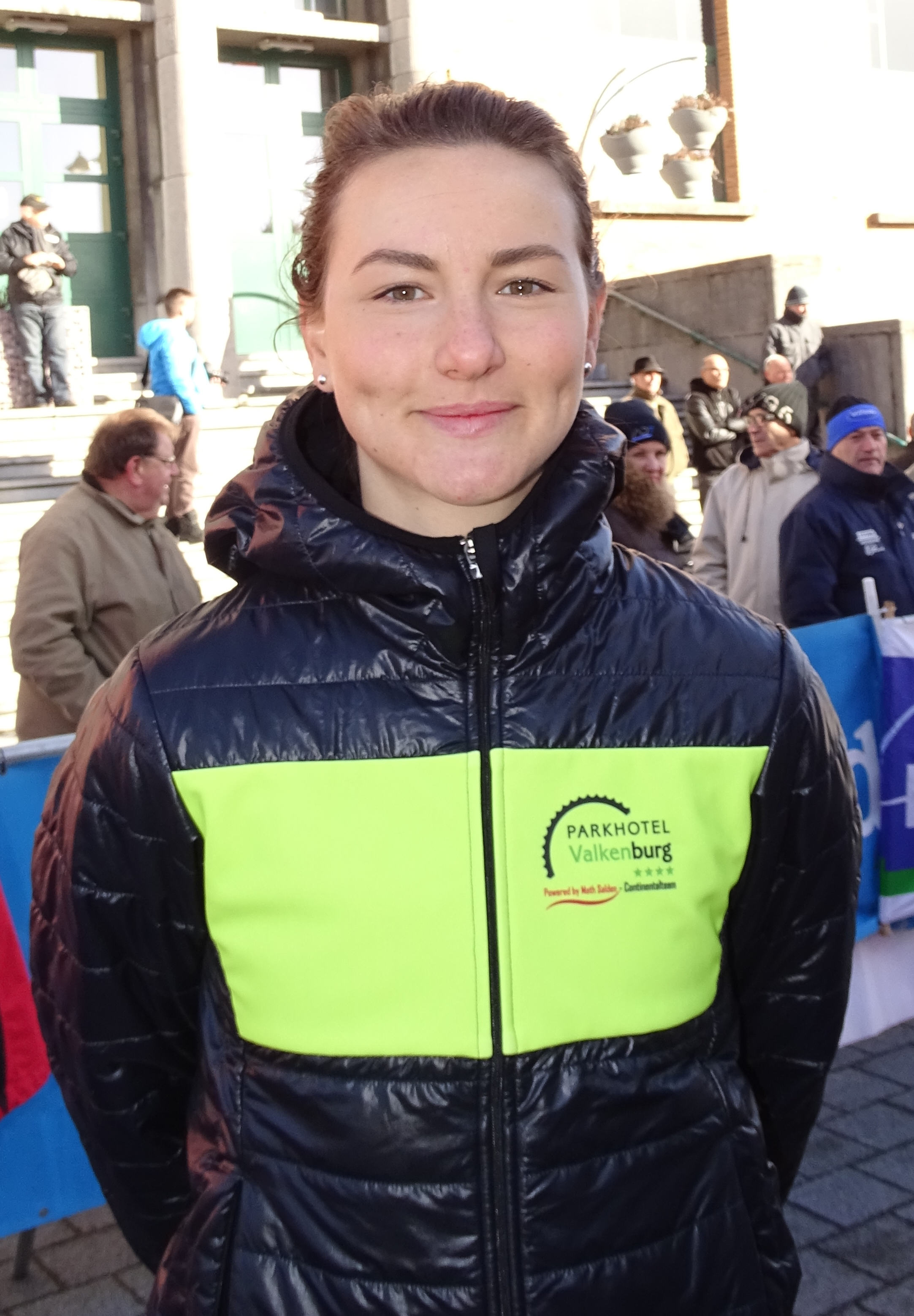
- Tromp in 2016

Personal information
- Born: 15 October 1990 (age 36) Coevorden, Netherlands

Cycling career
- Sport: Cycling
- Current team: Visma–Lease a Bike
- Discipline: Road
- Role: Rider (retired); Team manager

Amateur teams
- 2009–2010: Batavus Ladies Cycling Team
- 2011: Skil Koga

Professional teams
- 2012–2013: Skil 1t4i
- 2014: Parkhotel Valkenburg Continental Team
- 2016–2017: Parkhotel Valkenburg Continental Team

Managerial teams
- 2018–2020: Parkhotel Valkenburg
- 2021–: Team Jumbo–Visma

Esra Tromp (born 15 October 1990) is a Dutch former racing cyclist who now works as the team manager for UCI Women's Continental Team EF Education-Cannondale. She competed in the 2013 UCI women's team time trial in Florence.

== See also ==
- 2011 Skil Koga season
- 2012 Team Skil-Argos season
- 2013 Team Argos-Shimano season
- 2014 Parkhotel Valkenburg Continental Team season
