= 2012 Tour of Flanders for Women =

2012 UCI Women's Road World Cup, race 3 of 8

Race details
- Dates: 1 April 2012
- Stages: 1
- Distance: 127.4 km (79.2 mi)
- Winning time: 3h 19' 05"

Results
	Winner	Judith Arndt (GER)	(GreenEDGE–AIS)
	Second	Kristin Armstrong (USA)	(USA National Team)
	Third	Joëlle Numainville (CAN)	(Canada National Team)

The 2012 Tour of Flanders for Women was the ninth edition of the Tour of Flanders for Women single-day cycling race. The race took place on April 1, 2012, covering a distance of over 127.4 kilometres (79.2 mi). It was the third race of the 2012 UCI Women's Road World Cup season. Both the start and finish were in Oudenaarde, Belgium and 70 cyclists took part in the race.

== General standings (top 10) ==
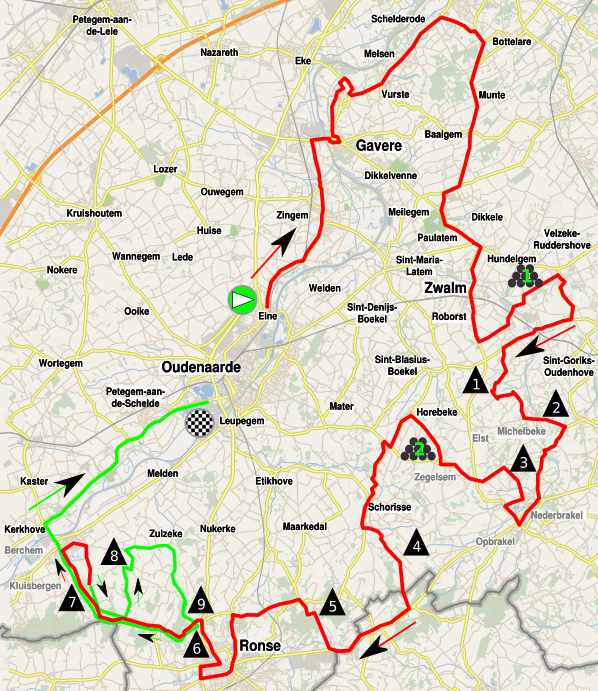
Map of the Tour of Flanders for Women 2012. Final in green.

	Cyclist	Team	Time	UCI World Cup Points
1	Judith Arndt (GER)	GreenEDGE–AIS	3h 19' 05"	100
2	Kristin Armstrong (USA)	USA National Team	+ 2"	70
3	Joëlle Numainville (CAN)	Canada National Team	+ 30"	40
4	Kirsten Wild (NED)	AA Drink–leontien.nl	+ 30"	30
5	Adrie Visser (NED)	Skil–Argos	+ 30"	25
6	Ellen van Dijk (NED)	Team Specialized–lululemon	+ 30"	20
7	Loes Gunnewijk (NED)	GreenEDGE–AIS	+ 30"	15
8	Christine Majerus (LUX)	Team GSD Gestion	+ 30"	10
9	Anna van der Breggen (NED)	Sengers Ladies Cycling Team	+ 30"	9
10	Alena Amialiusik (BLR)	Be Pink	+ 30"	8

Results from uci.ch.
