= 2012 UCI Women's Road World Cup =

Series of bicycle races

- Fifteenth edition of the UCI Women's Road World Cup

Details
- Dates: 10 March – 25 August
- Location: Europe and China
- Races: 8

Champions
- Individual champion: Marianne Vos (Rabobank Women Team)
- Teams' champion: Rabobank Women Team

The 2012 UCI Women's Road World Cup was the 15th edition of the UCI Women's Road World Cup. The calendar was to retain the same races as the 2011 edition, with the only change being the rescheduling of the Ronde van Drenthe to be the first race, until the GP Ciudad de Valladolid was cancelled for financial reasons. Annemiek van Vleuten was the defending champion.

Marianne Vos secured her fourth World Cup when she finished in third place at the Open de Suède Vårgårda, which gave her a sufficient points lead to ensure her victory regardless of the placings in the following week's final race, the Grand Prix de Plouay, which she also won.

== Races ==
| | Date | Race | Country | Winner | Second | Third |
|---|---|---|---|---|---|---|
| #1 | 10 March | Ronde van Drenthe | Netherlands | Marianne Vos (NED) | Kirsten Wild (NED) | Emma Johansson (SWE) |
| #2 | 25 March | Trofeo Alfredo Binda-Comune di Cittiglio | Italy | Marianne Vos (NED) | Tatiana Guderzo (ITA) | Trixi Worrack (GER) |
| #3 | 1 April | Tour of Flanders | Belgium | Judith Arndt (GER) | Kristin Armstrong (USA) | Joëlle Numainville (CAN) |
| #4 | 18 April | La Flèche Wallonne Féminine | Belgium | Evelyn Stevens (USA) | Marianne Vos (NED) | Linda Villumsen (NZL) |
| #5 | 13 August | Tour of Chongming Island World Cup | China | Shelley Olds (USA) | Melissa Hoskins (AUS) | Monia Baccaille (ITA) |
| #6 | 17 August | Open de Suède Vårgårda TTT | Sweden | Specialized–lululemon; Charlotte Becker (GER); Amber Neben (USA); Evelyn Stevens (USA); Ina Teutenberg (GER); Ellen van Dijk (NED); Trixi Worrack (GER) | Orica–AIS; Judith Arndt (GER); Shara Gillow (AUS); Loes Gunnewijk (NED); Claudia Häusler (GER); Alexis Rhodes (AUS); Linda Villumsen (NZL) | Rabobank Women Team; Tatiana Antoshina (RUS); Thalita de Jong (NED); Liesbet De Vocht (BEL); Roxane Knetemann (NED); Iris Slappendel (NED); Marianne Vos (NED) |
| #7 | 19 August | Open de Suède Vårgårda | Sweden | Iris Slappendel (NED) | Hanka Kupfernagel (GER) | Marianne Vos (NED) |
| #8 | 25 August | GP de Plouay | France | Marianne Vos (NED) | Tiffany Cromwell (AUS) | Elisa Longo Borghini (ITA) |

== Final points standings ==
=== Individuals ===
| Position | Rider | Team | Points |
|---|---|---|---|
| 1 | Marianne Vos (NED) | Rabobank Women Team | 335 |
| 2 | Judith Arndt (GER) | Orica–AIS | 187 |
| 3 | Evelyn Stevens (USA) | Specialized–lululemon | 152 |
| 4 | Trixi Worrack (GER) | Specialized–lululemon | 142 |
| 5 | Shelley Olds (USA) | AA Drink–leontien.nl | 125 |
| 6 | Emma Johansson (SWE) | Hitec Products–Mistral Home | 110 |
| 7 | Iris Slappendel (NED) | Rabobank Women Team | 109 |
| 8 | Kirsten Wild (NED) | AA Drink–leontien.nl | 108 |
| 9 | Tiffany Cromwell (AUS) | Orica–AIS | 89 |
| 10 | Linda Villumsen (NZL) | Orica–AIS | 76 |

=== Teams ===
| Place | UCI Code | Team Name | Points |
|---|---|---|---|
| 1 | RBW | Rabobank Women Team | 606 |
| 2 | GEW | Orica–AIS | 502 |
| 3 | SLU | Specialized–lululemon | 470 |
| 4 | LNL | AA Drink–leontien.nl | 387 |
| 5 | HPU | Hitec Products–Mistral Home | 203 |
