= 2013 Tour de Feminin – O cenu Českého Švýcarska =

Race details
- Dates: 4–7 July 2013
- Stages: 5
- Distance: 424.6 km (263.8 mi)
- Winning time: 11h 11' 29"

Results
Jersey awarded to the overall winner	Winner	Amy Cure (Australia)	(Australia national team)
	Second	Emma Pooley (Great Britain)	(Bigla Cycling Team)
	Third	Martina Ritter (Austria)	(Austria national team)
Jersey awarded to the points classification winner	Points	Amy Cure (Australia)	(Australia national team)
Jersey awarded to the mountains classification winner	Mountains	Paulina Brzeźna-Bentkowska (Poland)	(TKK Pacific Toruń)
Jersey awarded to the young rider classification winner	Young rider	Amy Cure (Australia)	(Australia national team)
	Team	Australia national team	

The 2013 Tour de Feminin – O cenu Ceského Švýcarska , or 2013 Tour de Feminin – Krásná Lípa, was the 26th running of the Tour de Feminin – Krásná Lípa rated by the UCI as 2.2. Tour de Feminin – Krásná Lípa is a stage race based in the Czech Republic, which forms part of the 2013 women's road cycling calendar. It will be held over five stages from 4 July to 7 July 2013, starting in Krásná Lípa, in the Ústí nad Labem Region and concluding back in Krásná Lípa. The race will run over four stages and one individual time trial.

== Stages ==
=== Stage 1 ===
4 July 2013 – Krásná Lípa to Krásná Lípa, 112 km (69.6 mi)

Stage 1 result

	Rider	Team	Time
1	Paulina Brzeźna-Bentkowska (POL)	TKK Pacific Toruń	3h 04' 36"
2	Katarzyna Niewiadoma (POL)	TKK Pacific Toruń	+ 9"
3	Lisanne Soemanta (NED)	Parkhotel Valkenburg	+ 9"
4	Mascha Pijnenborg (NED)	Team Futurumshop.nl	+ 16"
5	Amy Cure (AUS)	Australia (national team)	+ 16"
6	Taryn Heather (AUS)	Australia (national team)	+ 16"
7	Andrea Graus (AUT)	Bigla Cycling Team	+ 16"
8	Rebecca Wiasak (AUS)	Australia (national team)	+ 16"
9	Svetlana Bubnenkova (RUS)	Team Pratomagno	+ 16"
10	Tetyana Ryabchenko (UKR)	Ukraine (national team)	+ 16"

General Classification after Stage 1

	Rider	Team	Time
1	Paulina Brzeźna-Bentkowska (POL)	TKK Pacific Toruń	3h 04' 26"
2	Katarzyna Niewiadoma (POL)	TKK Pacific Toruń	+ 13"
3	Lisanne Soemanta (NED)	Parkhotel Valkenburg	+ 15"
4	Amy Cure (AUS)	Australia (national team)	+ 20"
5	Mascha Pijnenborg (NED)	Team Futurumshop.nl	+ 26"
6	Taryn Heather (AUS)	Australia (national team)	+ 26"
7	Andrea Graus (AUT)	Bigla Cycling Team	+ 26"
8	Rebecca Wiasak (AUS)	Australia (national team)	+ 26"
9	Svetlana Bubnenkova (RUS)	Team Pratomagno	+ 26"
10	Tetyana Ryabchenko (UKR)	Ukraine (national team)	+ 26"

=== Stage 2 ===
5 July 2013 – Jiříkov to Jirikov, 100.7 km (62.6 mi)

Stage 2 result

	Rider	Team	Time
1	Amy Cure (AUS)	Australia (national team)	2h 48' 22"
2	Mascha Pijnenborg (NED)	Team Futurumshop.nl	s.t.
3	Janine van der Meer (NED)	Team Futurumshop.nl	s.t.
4	Pavlína Šulcová (CZE)	Czech Republic (national team)	s.t.
5	Désirée Ehrler (SUI)	Switzerland (national team)	s.t.
6	Bianca van den Hoek (NED)	Parkhotel Valkenburg	s.t.
7	Svetlana Bubnenkova (RUS)	Team Pratomagno	s.t.
8	Katarzyna Niewiadoma (POL)	TKK Pacific Toruń	s.t.
9	Daniela Gass (DEU)	Team Pratomagno	s.t.
10	Jermaine Post (NED)	Parkhotel Valkenburg	s.t.

General Classification after Stage 2

	Rider	Team	Time
1	Paulina Brzeźna-Bentkowska (POL)	TKK Pacific Toruń	5h 52' 46"
2	Amy Cure (AUS)	Australia (national team)	+ 10"
3	Lisanne Soemanta (NED)	Parkhotel Valkenburg	+ 11"
4	Katarzyna Niewiadoma (POL)	TKK Pacific Toruń	+ 15"
5	Mascha Pijnenborg (NED)	Team Futurumshop.nl	+ 22"
6	Svetlana Bubnenkova (RUS)	Team Pratomagno	+ 31"
7	Taryn Heather (AUS)	Australia (national team)	+ 31"
8	Ivanna Borovychenko (UKR)	Ukraine (national team)	+ 31"
9	Rebecca Wiasak (AUS)	Australia (national team)	+ 31"
10	Tetyana Ryabchenko (UKR)	Ukraine (national team)	+ 31"

=== Stage 3 ===
6 July 2013 – Bogatynia to Bogatynia, 17.8 km (11.1 mi), individual time trial (ITT)

Stage 3 Result

	Rider	Team	Time
1	Emma Pooley (GBR)	Bigla Cycling Team	26' 47"
2	Martina Ritter (AUT)	Austria (national team)	+ 2"
3	Ester Fennel (DEU)	Koga Ladies	+ 4"
4	Amy Cure (AUS)	Australia (national team)	+ 21"
5	Taryn Heather (AUS)	Australia (national team)	+ 21"
6	Kseniya Dobrynina (RUS)	Russia (national team)	+ 25"
7	Rebecca Wiasak (AUS)	Australia (national team)	+ 30"
8	Lucy Coldwell (GBR)	Breast Cancer Cycling	+ 40"
9	Reta Trotman (NZL)	Maxx–Solar Women	+ 42"
10	Natalia Boyarskaya (RUS)	Team Pratomagno	+ 47"

General Classification after Stage 3

	Rider	Team	Time
1	Amy Cure (AUS)	Australia (national team)	6h 20' 04"
2	Ester Fennel (DEU)	Koga Ladies	+ 4"
3	Taryn Heather (AUS)	Australia (national team)	+ 21"
4	Martina Ritter (AUT)	Austria (national team)	+ 22"
5	Rebecca Wiasak (AUS)	Australia (national team)	+ 30"
6	Reta Trotman (NZL)	Maxx–Solar Women	+ 42"
7	Paulina Brzeźna-Bentkowska (POL)	TKK Pacific Toruń	+ 49"
8	Katarzyna Niewiadoma (POL)	TKK Pacific Toruń	+ 53"
9	Svetlana Bubnenkova (RUS)	Team Pratomagno	+ 1' 00"
10	Aušrinė Trebaitė (LTU)	Panevėžys Mix	+ 1' 01"

=== Stage 4 ===
6 July 2013 – Rumburk to Rumburk, 95.2 km (59.2 mi)

Stage 4 Result

	Rider	Team	Time
1	Amy Cure (AUS)	Australia (national team)	2h 35' 54"
2	Emma Pooley (GBR)	Bigla Cycling Team	s.t.
3	Karolina Garczyńska (POL)	Poland (national team)	+ 2' 13"
4	Daniela Gass (DEU)	Team Pratomagno	+ 2' 13"
5	Riejanne Markus (NED)	Parkhotel Valkenburg	+ 2' 13"
6	Natalia Mielnik (POL)	Poland (national team)	+ 2' 13"
7	Maryna Ivanyuk (UKR)	Ukraine (national team)	+ 2' 13"
8	Coryn Rivera (USA)	Breast Cancer Cycling	+ 2' 13"
9	Aušrinė Trebaitė (LTU)	Panevėžys Mix	+ 2' 15"
10	Jacqueline Hahn (AUT)	Austria (national team)	+ 2' 15"

General Classification after Stage 4

	Rider	Team	Time
1	Amy Cure (AUS)	Australia (national team)	8h 55' 49"
2	Emma Pooley (GBR)	Bigla Cycling Team	+ 1' 21"
3	Ester Fennel (DEU)	Koga Ladies	+ 2' 28"
4	Taryn Heather (AUS)	Australia (national team)	+ 2' 45"
5	Martina Ritter (AUT)	Austria (national team)	+ 2' 46"
6	Rebecca Wiasak (AUS)	Australia (national team)	+ 2' 54"
7	Reta Trotman (NZL)	Maxx–Solar Women	+ 3' 06"
8	Paulina Brzeźna-Bentkowska (POL)	TKK Pacific Toruń	+ 3' 13"
9	Katarzyna Niewiadoma (POL)	TKK Pacific Toruń	+ 3' 17"
10	Svetlana Bubnenkova (RUS)	Team Pratomagno	+ 3' 24"

=== Stage 5 ===
7 July 2013 – Varnsdorp to Krásná Lípa, 72 km (44.7 mi)

Stage 5 Result

	Rider	Team	Time
1	Emma Pooley (GBR)	Bigla Cycling Team	2h 15' 29"
2	Lisanne Soemanta (NED)	Parkhotel Valkenburg	+ 12"
3	Karolina Garczyńska (POL)	Poland (national team)	+ 12"
4	Yelyzaveta Oshurkova (UKR)	Ukraine (national team)	+ 12"
5	Amy Cure (AUS)	Australia (national team)	+ 12"
6	Paulina Brzeźna-Bentkowska (POL)	TKK Pacific Toruń	+ 12"
7	Svetlana Bubnenkova (RUS)	Team Pratomagno	+ 12"
8	Katarzyna Niewiadoma (POL)	TKK Pacific Toruń	+ 12"
9	Martina Ritter (AUT)	Austria (national team)	+ 12"
10	Natalia Boyarskaya (RUS)	Team Pratomagno	+ 12"

Final General Classification

	Rider	Team	Time
1	Amy Cure (AUS)	Australia (national team)	11h 11' 29"
2	Emma Pooley (GBR)	Bigla Cycling Team	+ 1' 00"
3	Martina Ritter (AUT)	Austria (national team)	+ 2' 47"
4	Ester Fennel (DEU)	Koga Ladies	+ 2' 57"
5	Paulina Brzeźna-Bentkowska (POL)	TKK Pacific Toruń	+ 3' 10"
6	Taryn Heather (AUS)	Australia (national team)	+ 3' 14"
7	Katarzyna Niewiadoma (POL)	TKK Pacific Toruń	+ 3' 18"
8	Svetlana Bubnenkova (RUS)	Team Pratomagno	+ 3' 25"
9	Rebecca Wiasak (AUS)	Australia (national team)	+ 3' 25"
10	Natalia Boyarskaya (RUS)	Team Pratomagno	+ 3' 44"

== Classification progress ==
Stage	Winner	General classification	Points classification	Mountains classification	Young rider classification
1	Paulina Brzeźna-Bentkowska	Paulina Brzeźna-Bentkowska	Paulina Brzeźna-Bentkowska	Lisanne Soemanta	Katarzyn Niewiadoma
2	Amy Cure	Paulina Brzeźna-Bentkowska	Amy Cure	Lisanne Soemanta	Amy Cure
3 (ITT)	Emma Pooley	Amy Cure	Amy Cure	Lisanne Soemanta	Amy Cure
4	Amy Cure	Amy Cure	Amy Cure	Paulina Brzeźna-Bentkowska	Amy Cure
5	Emma Pooley	Amy Cure	Amy Cure	Paulina Brzeźna-Bentkowska	Amy Cure
Final		Amy Cure	Amy Cure	Paulina Brzeźna-Bentkowska	Amy Cure
