= 2014 Dutch National Time Trial Championships – Women's time trial =

Women's time trial
2014 Dutch National Time Trial Championships
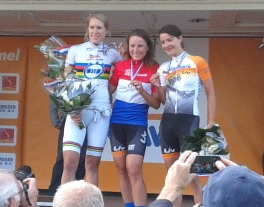

Race details
- Dates: 25 June 2014
- Stages: 1
- Distance: 23.76 km (14.76 mi)

Medalists
	Gold	Annemiek van Vleuten	(Rabobank-Liv Woman Cycling Team)
	Silver	Ellen van Dijk	(Boels–Dolmans)
	Bronze	Marianne Vos	(Rabobank-Liv Woman Cycling Team)

The Women's time trial of the 2014 Dutch National Time Trial Championships (NK tijdrijden 2014) will take place in Zaltbommel, the Netherlands, on 25 June 2014. It is the eighth time that Zaltbommel organizes the Dutch National Time Trial Championships. The last time was in 2009. Also Emmen showed interest to organizes the National Time Trial Championships, but will now be the host in 2015.

Ellen van Dijk is the defending champion, who won the national title at the 2013 Dutch National Time Trial Championships.

== Preview ==
Ellen van Dijk is as the defending champion and Time Trial World Champion the main favourite for the title. Her main rivals are Marianne Vos and Loes Gunnewijk.

== Results ==
=== Final classification ===
Rank	Rider	Team	Time	Difference	Speed (km/h)
1st place, gold medalist(s)	Annemiek van Vleuten	Rabobank-Liv Woman Cycling Team	30.22.63		46.930
2nd place, silver medalist(s)	Ellen van Dijk	Boels–Dolmans	30.22.89	+ 0.26	46.923
3rd place, bronze medalist(s)	Marianne Vos	Rabobank-Liv Woman Cycling Team	30.27.88	+ 5.25	46.795
4	Chantal Blaak	Specialized–lululemon	30.29.63	+ 7.00	46.750
5	Anna van der Breggen	Rabobank-Liv Woman Cycling Team	30.35.99	+ 13.36	46.588
6	Vera Koedooder	Bigla Cycling Team	30.51.61	+ 28.98	46.195
7	Roxane Knetemann	Rabobank-Liv Woman Cycling Team	31.32.62	+ 1:09.99	45.194
8	Loes Gunnewijk	Orica–AIS	31.51.31	+ 1:28.68	44.753
9	Iris Slappendel	Rabobank-Liv Woman Cycling Team	31.53.44	+ 1:30.81	44.703
10	Thalita de Jong	Rabobank-Liv Woman Cycling Team	32.10.87	+ 1:48.24	44.299
11	Marijn De Vries	Team Giant–Shimano	32.18.30	+ 1:55.67	44.129
12	Lucinda Brand	Rabobank-Liv Woman Cycling Team	32.20.21	+ 1:57.58	44.086
13	Sabrina Stultiens	Rabobank-Liv Woman Cycling Team	32.30.85	+ 2:08.22	43.846
14	Amy Pieters	Team Giant–Shimano	32.48.55	+ 2:25.92	43.451
15	Pauliena Rooijakkers		32.52.13	+ 2:29.50	43.372
16	Floortje Mackaij	Team Giant–Shimano	32.53.56	+ 2:30.93	43.341
17	Mathilde Matthijsse		32.53.65	+ 2:31.02	43.339
18	Natalie Van Gogh	Parkhotel Valkenburg Continental Team	32.55.52	+ 2:32.89	43.298
19	Anouska Koster	Futurumshop.nl–Zannata	33.09.47	+ 2:46.84	42.994
20	Esra Tromp	Parkhotel Valkenburg Continental Team	33.13.21	+ 2:50.58	42.914
21	Nina Kessler	Boels–Dolmans	33.17.87	+ 2:55.24	42.814
22	Trieneke Fokkens		33.19.70	+ 2:57.07	42.774
23	Charlotte Lenting		33.34.14	+ 3:11.51	42.468
24	Demi de Jong	Boels–Dolmans	33.34.33	+ 3:11.70	42.464
25	Olga De Boer		33.38.46	+ 3:15.83	42.377
26	Harriet Koorn		33.45.05	+ 3:22.42	42.239
27	Maria Sterk		33.46.18	+ 3:23.55	42.215
28	Laura Gorter		34.07.36	+ 3:44.74	41.778
29	Mascha Pijnenborg	Futurumshop.nl–Zannata	34.08.12	+ 3:45.49	41.763
30	Lauren Arnouts		34.09.51	+ 3:46.88	41.735
31	Winanda Spoor		34.13.18	+ 3:50.55	41.660
32	Kelly Markus	Team Rytger	34.35.73	+ 4:13.10	41.208
33	Channah Brandsema		34.40.32	+ 4:17.69	41.117
34	Evy Kuypers	Futurumshop.nl–Zannata	34.45.54	+ 4:22.91	41.014
35	Maud Kaptheijns		34.51.56	+ 4:28.93	40.896

=== Inverse starting order ===
All times are (UTC+1).

Time	Name	#
17:39	Ellen van Dijk	1
17:38	Loes Gunnewijk	2
17:37	Marianne Vos	3
17:36	Vera Koedooder	4
17:35	Marijn de Vries	5
17:34	Natalie van Gogh	6
17:33	Annemiek van Vleuten	7
17:32	Mathilde Matthijsse	8
17:31	Chantal Blaak	9
17:30	Maria Sterk	10
17:29	Thalita de Jong	11
17:28	Esra Tromp	12
17:27	Amy Pieters	13
17:26	Anouska Koster	14
17:25	Iris Slappendel	15
17:24	Demi de Jong	16
17:23	Channah Brandsema	17
17:22	Harriet Koorn	18
17:21	Roxane Knetemann	19
17:20	Mascha Pijnenborg	20
17:19	Lauren Arnouts	21
17:18	Kelly Markus	22
17:17	Sabrina Stultiens	23
17:16	Nina Kessler	24
17:15	Winanda Spoor	25
17:14	Maud Kaptheijns	26
17:13	Evy Kuijpers	27
17:12	Anna van der Breggen	28
17:11	Floortje Mackaij	29
17:10	Nicky Zijlaard	30
17:09	Laura Gorter	31
17:08	Pauliena Rooijakkers	32
17:07	Lucinda Brand	33
17:06	Charlotte Lenting	34
17:05	Olga de Boer	35
