= 2013 Dutch National Time Trial Championships – Women's time trial =

Women's time trial
2013 Dutch National Time Trial Championships
- 2013 Dutch National Time Trial Championships logo

Race details
- Dates: 19 June 2012
- Stages: 1
- Distance: 26 km (16 mi)
- Winning time: 33' 56.61

Medalists
	Gold	Ellen van Dijk	(Specialized–lululemon)
	Silver	Loes Gunnewijk	(Orica–AIS)
	Bronze	Annemiek van Vleuten	(Rabobank-Liv Giant)

The Women's time trial of the 2013 Dutch National Time Trial Championships (NK tijdrijden) cycling took place in and around Winsum, nearby the city Groningen, in the Netherlands on 19 June 2013. Winsum got the event due to the success of the 2012 Energiewacht Tour. The individual time trial at the 2013 Energiewacht Tour took place on the same course. Ellen van Dijk was the defending champion, who won the national title at the 2012 Dutch National Time Trial Championships.

Ellen van Dijk won the time trial in a time of 33’ 56", 39 seconds ahead of Loes Gunnewijk and 61 seconds of Annemiek van Vleuten.

== Preview ==
Ellen van Dijk, the 2012 Dutch national champion, was the main favourite for the title. She was the best Duch rider in all the 2013 time trials (stage 3a 2013 Energiewacht Tour, 2013 EPZ Omloop van Borsele, prologue and stage 2 2013 Gracia–Orlová, GP Leende, 2013 Emakumeen Euskal Bira) and won them almost all. The best Dutch riders in the time trial at the 2013 Energiewacht Tour on the same course behind Van Dijk were Loes Gunnewijk and Kirsten Wild. One of the other favourites was Annemiek van Vleuten, the runner up of the 2012 edition.

== Schedule ==
Wednesday 19 June
10:30 First block of 20 cyclists
11:30 Second block of 20 cyclists
12:45 Victory Ceremony

== Results ==
=== Final classification ===
Rank	Rider	Team/Club	City	Time
1st place, gold medalist(s)	Ellen van Dijk	Specialized–lululemon	Amsterdam	33’ 56.61"
2nd place, silver medalist(s)	Loes Gunnewijk	Orica–AIS	Zwolle	+ 39"
3rd place, bronze medalist(s)	Annemiek van Vleuten	Rabobank-Liv Giant	Wageningen	+ 1' 01"
4	Vera Koedooder	Sengers Ladies Cycling Team	Apeldoorn	+ 1' 50"
5	Natalie van Gogh	RSC de Zuidwesthoek	Nieuw Vennep	+ 2' 20"
6	Mathilde Matthijsse	ZRTC Theo Middelkamp	Schore	+ 2' 23"
7	Thalita de Jong	Rabobank-Liv Giant	Ossendrecht	+ 2' 28"
8	Iris Slappendel	Rabobank-Liv Giant	Ouderkerk aan den IJssel	+ 2' 38"
9	Chantal Blaak	Team TIBCO	Nieuwerkerk aan den IJssel	+ 2' 39"
10	Roxane Knetemann	Rabobank-Liv Giant	Nijkerk	+ 2' 55"
11	Esra Tromp	Skil–Argos	Coevorden	+ 2' 56"
12	Adrie Visser	Dolmans-Boels Cycling Team	Wieringerwerf	+ 2' 57"
13	Marijn de Vries	Lotto–Belisol Ladies	Zwolle	+ 3' 09"
14	Sabrina Stultiens	Rabobank-Liv Giant	Meijel	+ 3' 12"
15	Amy Pieters	Skil–Argos	Zwanenburg	+ 3' 19"
16	Mascha Pijnenborg	Team Futurumshop.nl	Drunen	+ 3' 22"
17	Rixt Meijer	WV Noord-Westhoek		+ 3' 28"
18	Maria Sterk	WV Noord-Westhoek	Hallum	+ 3' 28"
19	Anouska Koster	Team Futurumshop.nl	De Westereen	+ 3' 35"
20	Larissa Drysdale	Cycle Sport Groningen	Heerenveen	+ 3' 36"
21	Harriet Koorn	LRTV Swift	Leiden	+ 3' 50"
22	Channah Brandsema	CS030	Utrecht	+ 3' 56"
23	Lauren Arnouts	Restore Cycling	Rijsbergen	+ 3' 59"
24	Ingeborg Kreuze	WV Noord-Westhoek	Assen	+ 4' 03"
25	Lisanne Soemanta	Parkhotel Valkenburg p/b Math Salden	Haarlem	+ 4' 16"
26	Kelly Markus	Skil–Argos	Hoofddorp	+ 4' 17"
27	Judith Visser	De Noordelijk ATB-club	Groningen	+ 4' 21"
28	Winanda Spoor	GRC Jan van Arckel	Apeldoorn	+ 4' 56"
29	Maud Kaptheijns	TWC de Kempen	Westerhoven	+ 4' 58"
30	Nina Kessler	Dolmans-Boels Cycling Team	Velserbroek	+ 5' 02"
31	Olga de Boer	LRTV Swift	Hazerswoude	+ 5' 07"
32	Britt Teunissen	TWC de Kempen	Ysselsteyn	+ 5' 26"
33	Janine van der Meer	Team Futurumshop.nl	Abbenbroek	+ 5' 35"
34	Melissa Slewe	ZWC D.T.S.	Assendelft	+ 5' 36"
35	Riejanne Markus	Parkhotel Valkenburg p/b Math Salden	Amstelveen	+ 6' 26"
36	Danielle Meijering	De Noordelijk ATB-club	Stadskanaal	+ 7' 51"
	Lotte van Hoek	Restore Cycling	Vlijmen	DNS
	Sanne van Paassen	Rabobank-Liv Giant	Vlierden	DNS

=== Starting order ===
#	Time	Rider
40	10:30	Janine van der Meer
39	10:31	Judith Visser
38	10:32	Winanda Spoor
37	10:33	Olga de Boer
36	10:34	Lotte van Hoek
35	10:35	Sanne van Paassen
34	10:36	Kelly Markus
33	10:37	Mathilde Matthijsse
32	10:38	Riejanne Markus
31	10:39	Lisanne Soemanta
30	10:40	Danielle Meijering
29	10:41	Sabrina Stultiens
28	10:42	Ingeborg Kreuze
27	10:43	Mascha Pijnenborg
26	10:44	Nina Kessler
25	10:45	Lauren Arnouts
24	10:46	Roxane Knetemann
23	10:47	Maria Sterk
22	10:48	Melissa Slewe
21	10:49	Thalita de Jong
20	11:30	Britt Teunissen
19	11:31	Channah Brandsema
18	11:32	Esra Tromp
17	11:33	Maud Kaptheijns
16	11:34	-
15	11:35	Harriet Koorn
14	11:36	Anouska Koster
13	11:37	-
12	11:38	Larissa Drysdale
11	11:39	Chantal Blaak
10	11:40	Iris Slappendel
9	11:41	Amy Pieters
8	11:42	Marijn de Vries
7	11:43	Adrie Visser
6	11:44	Rixt Meijer
5	11:45	Natalie van Gogh
4	11:46	Vera Koedooder
3	11:47	Annemiek van Vleuten
2	11:48	Loes Gunnewijk
1	11:49	Ellen van Dijk

== See also ==
- 2013 Dutch National Road Race Championships – Women's road race
- 2013 national road cycling championships
