= 2014 Auensteiner-Radsporttage =

Race details
- Dates: 31 May –1 June 2014
- Stages: 2

The 2014 Auensteiner-Radsporttage was the inaugural edition of the Auensteiner–Radsporttage, a women's cycling stage race in Germany. It was rated by the UCI as category 2.2.

== Stages ==
=== Stage 1 ===
31 May 2014 – Ilsfeld to Ilsfeld, 12.8 km (8.0 mi) (ITT)

Stage 1 Result & General classification

	Rider	Team	Time
1	Lisa Brennauer (GER)	Velocio–SRAM Pro Cycling	17' 53"
2	Esther Fennel (GER)		+ 14"
3	Martina Ritter (AUT)	BTC City Ljubljana	+ 18"
4	Ann-Sophie Duyck (BEL)		+ 33"
5	Trixi Worrack (GER)	Velocio–SRAM Pro Cycling	+ 38"
6	Maria Giulia Confalonieri (ITA)	Estado de México–Faren Kuota	+ 44"
7	Taryn Heather (AUS)	Bigla Cycling Team	+ 51"
8	Rossella Ratto (ITA)	Estado de México–Faren Kuota	+ 51"
9	Eugenia Bujak (POL)	Bigla Cycling Team	+ 53"
10	Kataržina Sosna (LTU)	Vaiano Fondriest	+ 53"

=== Stage 2 ===
1 June 2014 – Auenstein to Auenstein, 118.3 km (73.5 mi)

Stage 2 result

	Rider	Team	Time
1	Lisa Brennauer (GER)	Velocio–SRAM Pro Cycling	3h 30' 13"
2	Trixi Worrack (GER)	Velocio–SRAM Pro Cycling	+ 2"
3	Rossella Ratto (ITA)	Estado de México–Faren Kuota	+ 2"
4	Reta Trotman (NZL)		+ 2"
5	Romy Kasper (GER)	Team SD Worx–Protime	+ 2"
6	Martina Ritter (AUT)	BTC City Ljubljana	+ 2"
7	Tiffany Cromwell (AUS)	Velocio–SRAM Pro Cycling	+ 9"
8	Élise Delzenne (FRA)	Velocio–SRAM Pro Cycling	+ 2' 25"
9	Beate Zanner (GER)		+ 2' 25"
10	Martina Zwick (GER)	Bigla Cycling Team	+ 2' 25"

Final General Classification

	Rider	Team	Time
1	Lisa Brennauer (GER)	Velocio–SRAM Pro Cycling	3h 47' 53"
2	Martina Ritter (AUT)	BTC City Ljubljana	+ 33"
3	Trixi Worrack (GER)	Velocio–SRAM Pro Cycling	+ 45"
4	Rossella Ratto (ITA)	Estado de México–Faren Kuota	+ 59"
5	Reta Trotman (NZL)		+ 1' 15"
6	Tiffany Cromwell (AUS)	Velocio–SRAM Pro Cycling	+ 44"
7	Romy Kasper (GER)	Team SD Worx–Protime	+ 2' 10"
8	Esther Fennel (GER)		+ 2' 52"
9	Maria Giulia Confalonieri (ITA)	Estado de México–Faren Kuota	+ 3' 19"
10	Taryn Heather (AUS)	Bigla Cycling Team	+ 3' 29"

== Classification leadership table ==
Stage	Winner	General classification	Youth classification	Mountains classification	Teams classification
1	Lisa Brennauer	Lisa Brennauer	Maria Giulia Confalonieri	Not awarded	Velocio–SRAM Pro Cycling
2	Lisa Brennauer	Lisa Brennauer	Rossella Ratto	Rossella Ratto	Velocio–SRAM Pro Cycling
Final		Lisa Brennauer	Rossella Ratto	Rossella Ratto	Velocio–SRAM Pro Cycling

== See also ==
- 2014 in women's road cycling
