= 2012 Dutch National Time Trial Championships – Women's time trial =

Women's time trial
2012 Dutch National Time Trial Championships
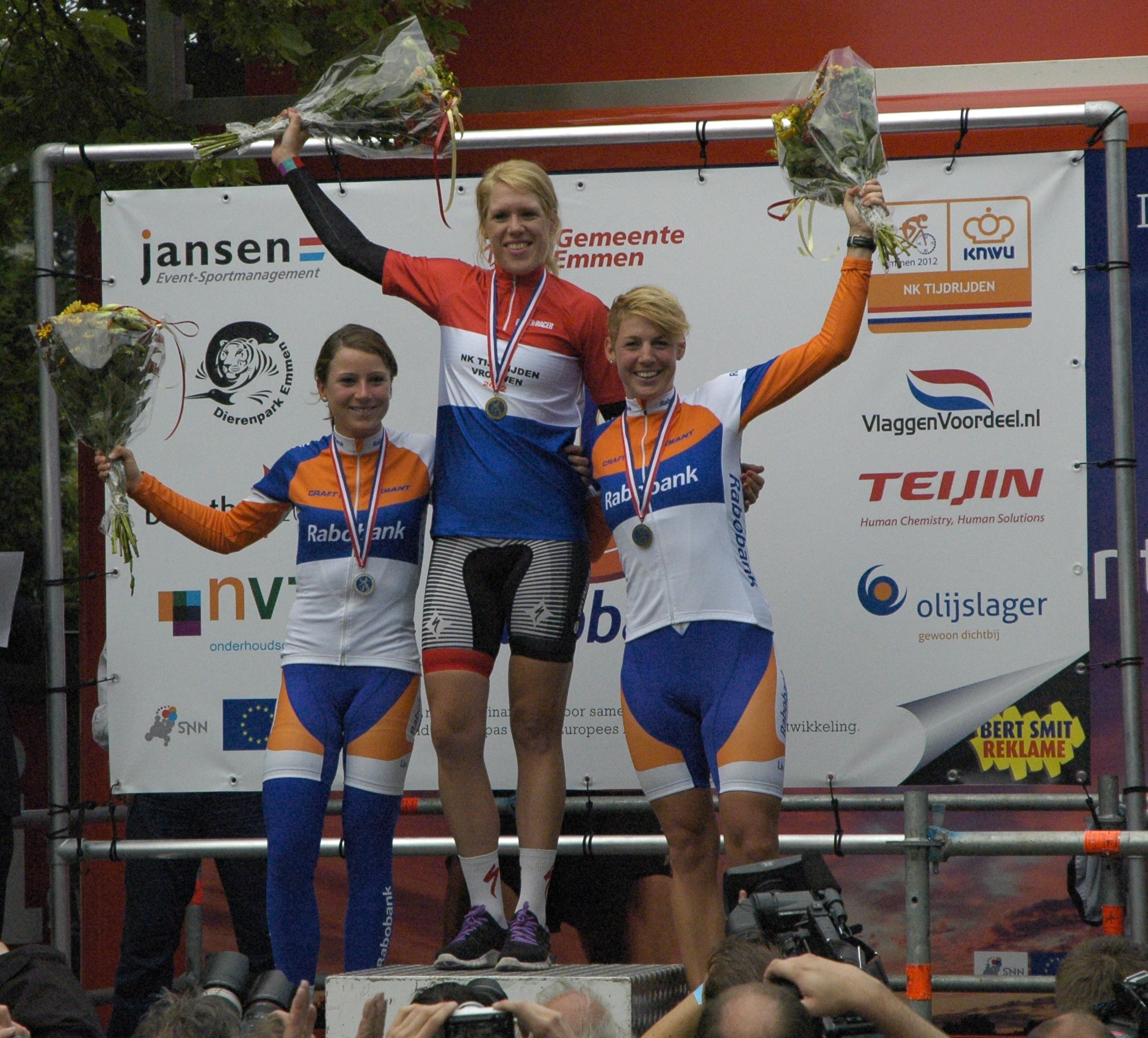
- The podium 1) Ellen van Dijk, 2) Annemiek van Vleuten, 3) Iris Slappendel

Race details
- Dates: 20 June 2012
- Stages: 1
- Distance: 22.65 km (14.07 mi)
- Winning time: 30' 27.55"

Medalists
	Gold	Ellen van Dijk	(Team Specialized–lululemon)
	Silver	Annemiek van Vleuten	(Rabobank Women Cycling Team)
	Bronze	Iris Slappendel	(Rabobank Women Cycling Team)

The Women's time trial of the 2012 Dutch National Time Trial Championships cycling event took place on 20 June 2012 in and around Emmen, Netherlands. The first women started at 17:00. The course was 22.65 km.

The time trial started in Dierenpark Emmen, the zoo of Emmen, besides the African savanna. It was the first time in history a cycle race started in a zoo. Riders rode along the zebras, giraffes, rhinos and hippos.

Ellen van Dijk (Team Specialized–lululemon) became for the second time in her career Dutch national time trial Champion. She won also the title in 2007. Van Dijk finished 14 seconds ahead of Annemiek van Vleuten (Rabobank) and 67 seconds of Iris Slappendel (Rabobank).

== Results ==
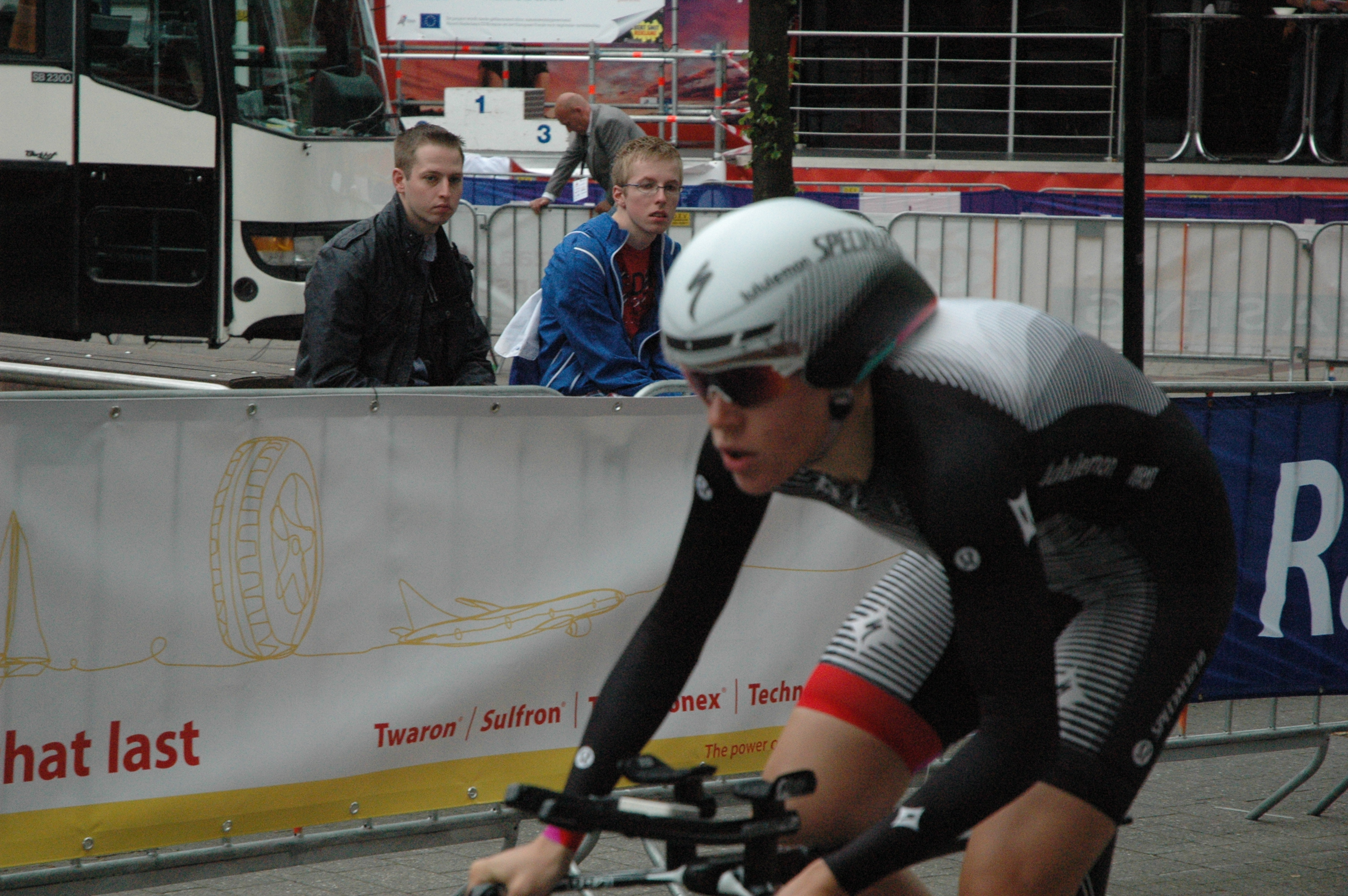
Ellen van Dijk riding to victory

=== Final classification ===
Rank	Rider	Team	Age*	City	Time
1st place, gold medalist(s)	Ellen van Dijk	Team Specialized–lululemon	25	Amsterdam	30’ 27.55"
2nd place, silver medalist(s)	Annemiek van Vleuten	Rabobank Women Cycling Team	30	Wageningen	+ 14"
3rd place, bronze medalist(s)	Iris Slappendel	Rabobank Women Cycling Team	27	Ouderkerk aan den IJssel	+ 1’ 07"
4	Natalie van Gogh	Team Ibis Cycles	38	Nieuw Vennep	+ 1’ 20"
5	Anna van der Breggen	Sengers Ladies Cycling Team	22	Hasselt	+ 1’ 36"
6	Loes Gunnewijk	GreenEDGE–AIS	32	Zwolle	+ 1’ 41"
7	Anouska Koster	Dolmans-Boels Cycling Team	19	De Westereen	+ 1’ 50"
8	Marijn de Vries	AA Drink–leontien.nl	34	Zwolle	+ 1’ 51"
9	Vera Koedooder	Sengers Ladies Cycling Team	29	Apeldoorn	+ 1’ 59"
10	Amy Pieters	Skil–Argos	21	Zwanenburg	+ 2’ 00"
11	Roxane Knetemann	Rabobank Women Cycling Team	25	Krommenie	+ 2’ 15"
12	Mathilde Matthysse	-	32	Grijpskerke	+ 2’ 15"
13	Rixt Meijer	-	30	Heerenveen	+ 2’ 24"
14	Larissa Drysdale	-	41	Heerenveen	+ 2’ 35"
15	Mascha Pijnenborg	Dolmans-Boels Cycling Team	31	Drunen	+ 2’ 38"
16	Esther Olthuis	Team Ibis Cycles	34	Deventer	+ 2’ 44"
17	Charlotte Lenting	-	20	Didam	+ 3’ 05"
18	Marieke van Wanroij	AA Drink–leontien.nl	33	Nijmegen	+ 3’ 10"
19	Olga Velzen	-	36	Hazerswoude	+ 3’ 22"
20	Pauliena Rooijakkers	Dolmans-Boels Cycling Team	19	Asten-Heusden	+ 3’ 34"
21	Rebecca Talen	Rabobank Women Cycling Team	19	Spijkenisse	+ 3’ 35"
22	Birgit Lavrijssen	Sengers Ladies Cycling Team	21	Kapelle	+ 3’ 37"
23	Ivana Tiessens	-	21	Zuidhorn	+ 3’ 46"
24	Linda Van Rijen	Skil–Argos	24	Vlijmen	+ 3’ 47"

*Age at the day of the competition.

Results from uci.ch and knwu.nl

=== Starting order ===
#	Time	Rider
1	17:00	Birgit Lavrijssen
2	17:01	Roxane Knetemann
3	17:02	Winanda Spoor
4	17:03	Olga de Boer
5	17:04	Rixt Meijer
6	17:05	Larissa Drysdale
7	17:06	Anna van der Breggen
8	17:07	Rebecca Talen
9	17:08	Anouska Koster
10	17:09	Esther Olthuis
11	17:10	Vera Koedooder
12	17:11	Marieke van Wanroij
13	17:12	Mascha Pijnenborg
14	17:13	Natalie van Gogh
15	17:14	Ivana Tiessens
16	17:15	Linda van Rijen
17	17:16	Amy Pieters
18	17:17	Charlotte Lenting
19	17:18	Annemiek van Vleuten
20	17:19	Pauliena Rooijakkers
21	17:20	Marijn de Vries
22	17:21	Mathilde Matthijsse
23	17:22	Ellen van Dijk
24	17:23	Iris Slappendel
25	17:24	Loes Gunnewijk

Startlist from knwu.nl.
