= 2009 Dutch National Time Trial Championships – Women's time trial =

Women's time trial
2009 Dutch National Time Trial Championships
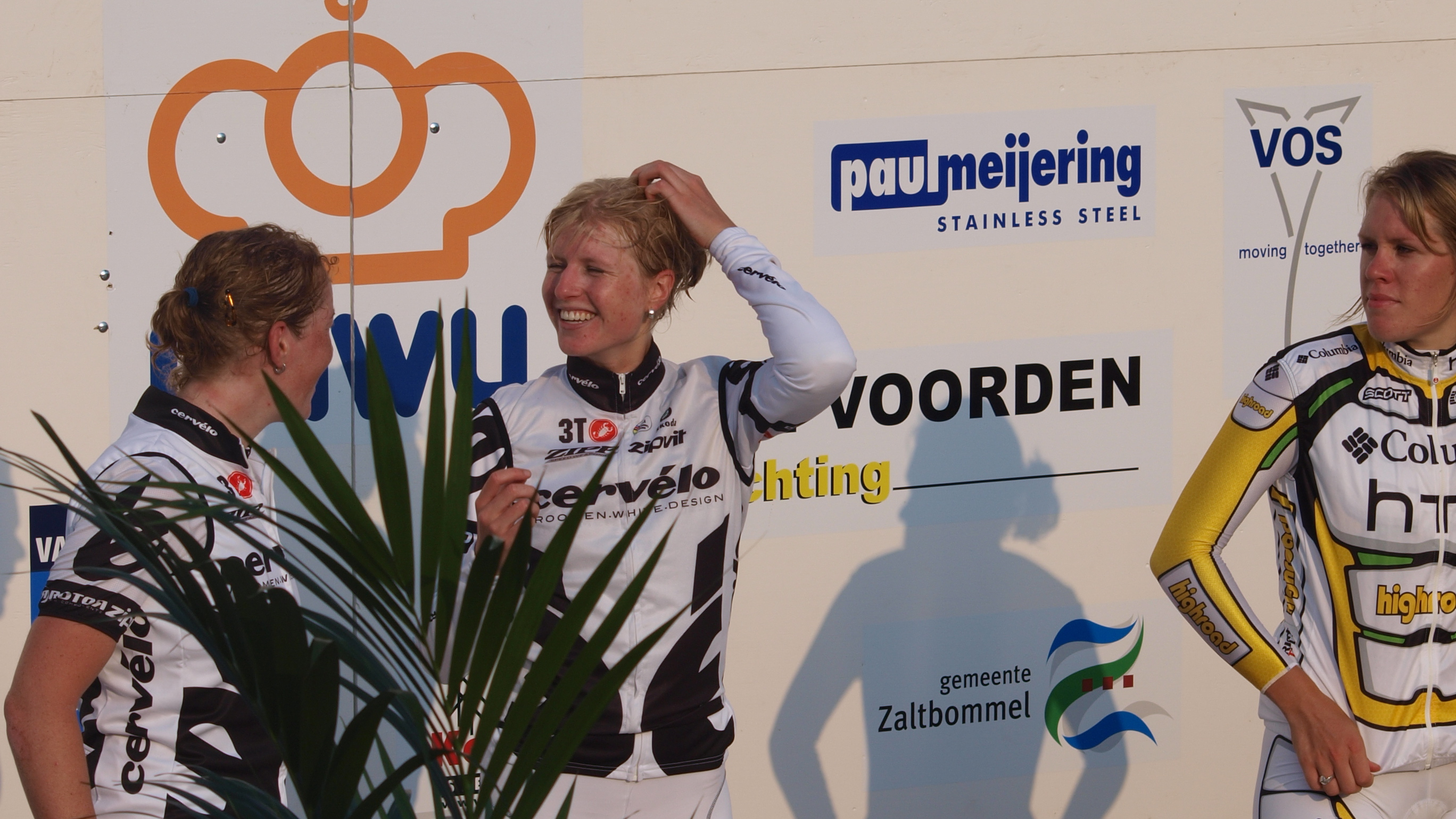
- Podium: 1. Regina Bruins, 2. Kirsten Wild, 3. Ellen van Dijk

Race details
- Dates: 27 August 2009
- Stages: 1
- Distance: 22.30 km (13.86 mi)
- Winning time: 29' 06.55"

Medalists
| | Gold | Regina Bruins | (Cervélo Test Team) |
| | Silver | Kirsten Wild | (Cervélo Test Team) |
| | Bronze | Ellen van Dijk | (Team HTC-Columbia Women) |

The Women's time trial of the 2009 Dutch National Time Trial Championships cycling event took place on 27 August 2009 in and around Zaltbommel, Netherlands. The competition was run over a 22.3 km flat course and the first rider started at 17:10. Riders started 1 minute apart from each other. 35 cyclists participated in the contest.

Regina Bruins won the time trial in a time of 29' 06.55", ahead of Kirsten Wild and Ellen van Dijk.

== Race details ==
=== Starting list ===
| Time | Rider | City |
|---|---|---|
| 17:10 | Liesbeth Bakker | Wieringerwerf |
| 17:11 | Esra Tromp | Coevorden |
| 17:12 | Josien van Wingerden | Sliedrecht |
| 17:13 | Noortje Tabak | Bergeijk |
| 17:14 | Marieke den Otter | Hoornaar |
| 17:15 | Judith Visser | Groningen |
| 17:16 | Lucinda Brand | Oud-Beijerland |
| 17:17 | Janneke Kanis | Zwolle |
| 17:18 | Roxane Knetemann | Krommenie |
| 17:19 | Monique van de Ree | Willemstad |
| 17:20 | Marieke van Nek | Lelystad |
| 17:21 | Juliette Wigbold | Australië |
| 17:22 | Els Visser | Groningen |
| 17:23 | Bianca van den Hoek | Bussum |
| 17:24 | Melissa Slewe | Assendelft |
| 17:25 | Rixt Meijer | Heerenveen |
| 17:26 | Anne de Wildt | Heiloo |
| 17:27 | Marissa Otten | Enter |
| 17:28 | Amanda Bongaards | De Lier |
| 17:29 | Irene v.d. Broek | Utrecht |
| 17:30 | Njisk Nauta | Amsterdam |
| 17:31 | Maria Sterk | Hallum |
| 17:32 | Marieke van Wanroij | Nijmegen |
| 17:33 | Natalie van Gogh | Nieuw-Vennep |
| 17:34 | Chantal Blaak | Hoogvliet |
| 17:35 | Esther van der Zwaan | Oostwold |
| 17:36 | Annemiek van Vleuten | Wageningen |
| 17:37 | Vera Koedooder | Bovenkarspel |
| 17:38 | Iris Slappendel | Ouderkerk aan den IJssel |
| 17:39 | Regina Bruins | Leiderdorp |
| 17:40 | Ellen van Dijk | Amsterdam |
| 17:41 | Marianne Vos | Meeuwen |
| 17:42 | Loes Gunnewijk | Zwolle |
| 17:43 | Kirsten Wild | Zwolle |
| 17:44 | Mirjam Melchers | Moergestel |

Startlist from wielersupport.nl

=== Final results ===
| Rank | Rider | Team | Age | Time |
|---|---|---|---|---|
| 1st place, gold medalist(s) | Regina Bruins | CWT | 23 | 29' 06.55” |
| 2nd place, silver medalist(s) | Kirsten Wild | CWT | 27 | + 6” |
| 3rd place, bronze medalist(s) | Ellen van Dijk | TCW | 22 | + 16” |
| 4 | Marianne Vos | DSB | 22 | + 22” |
| 5 | Vera Koedooder | LBL | 26 | + 28” |
| 6 | Loes Gunnewijk | FLX | 29 | + 34” |
| 7 | Mirjam Melchers-van Poppel | FLX | 34 | + 39” |
| 8 | Iris Slappendel | FLX | 24 | + 1' 02” |
| 9 | Chantal Blaak | LNL | 20 | + 1' 25” |
| 10 | Annemiek van Vleuten | DSB | 27 | + 1' 38” |
| 11 | Esther van der Zwaan | - | 23 | + 1' 44” |
| 12 | Natalie van Gogh | SWA | 35 | + 1' 49” |
| 13 | Lucinda Brand | LNL | 20 | + 1' 56” |
| 14 | Irene van den Broek | LNL | 29 | + 2' 01” |
| 15 | Roxane Knetemann | TVB | 22 | + 2' 24” |
| 16 | Liesbeth Bakker | DSB | 23 | + 2' 35” |
| 17 | Rixt Meijer | CTP | 27 | + 2' 46” |
| 18 | Noortje Tabak | DSB | 21 | + 2' 53” |
| 19 | Josien van den heerik | LNL | 22 | + 2' 57” |
| 20 | Maria Sterk | - | 30 | + 2' 57” |
| 21 | Njisk Nauta | - | 30 | + 2' 59” |
| 22 | Judith Visser | CTP | 24 | + 3' 01” |
| 23 | Marissa Otten | RLF | 20 | + 3' 03” |
| 24 | Anne de Wildt | BAT | 20 | + 3' 05” |
| 25 | Els Visser | - | 27 | + 3' 18” |
| 26 | Amanda Bongaards | RSC | 21 | + 3' 22” |
| 27 | Juliette Wigbold | CTP | 23 | + 3' 22” |
| 28 | Marieke van Nek | CTP | 21 | + 3' 26” |
| 29 | Monique van de Ree | LNL | 21 | + 3' 37” |
| 30 | Marieke van Wanroij | DSB | 30 | + 3' 42” |
| 31 | Melissa Slewe | MER | 20 | + 3' 55” |
| 32 | Esra Tromp | BAT | 19 | + 4' 02” |
| 33 | Marieke den Otter | JVA | 19 | + 4' 02” |
| 34 | Bianca van den Hoek | MER | 33 | + 4' 11” |
| 35 | Janneke Kanis | DSB | 24 | + 4' 19” |

Results from uci.ch and wielersupport.nl
