= 2014 Gracia-Orlová =

2014 Gracia–Orlová
Race details
- Dates: 1–4 May
- Stages: 4
- Distance: 315.1 km (195.8 mi)
- Winning time: 8h 48' 27"

Results
Jersey awarded to the overall winner	Winner	Paulina Brzeźna-Bentkowska (POL)	(Pacific Toruń)
	Second	Katrin Garfoot (AUS)	(Australia national team)
	Third	Eugenia Bujak (POL)	(BTC City Ljubljana)
Jersey awarded to the points classification winner	Points	Paulina Brzeźna-Bentkowska (POL)	(Pacific Toruń)
Jersey awarded to the mountains classification winner	Mountains	Tatyana Ryabchenko (UKR)	(Ukraine national team)
	Team	BTC City Ljubljana	

The 2014 Gracia–Orlová was the 28th edition of a stage race held in the Czech Republic, with a UCI rating of 2.2. It was the seventh stage race of the 2014 Women's Elite cycling calendar.

The 2014 edition of the race faced some organisational problems; there were two less stages compared to the 2013 edition of the race. The organisers had to cancel a stage only a month before the race, due to two sponsors dropping out.

The winner of the 2013 edition, Ellen van Dijk, did not start, as she competed in the concurrent Festival Luxembourgeois du cyclisme féminin Elsy Jacobs. Furthermore, Specialized–lululemon, who won most of the stages in 2013, did not compete in the 2014 edition.

== Stages ==
=== Prologue ===
1 May 2014 – Havířov, 2.2 km (1.4 mi), individual time trial (ITT)

Prologue Result and General Classification after Prologue

	Rider	Team	Time
1	Rebecca Wiasak (AUS)	Australia (national team)	2' 47"
2	Felicity Wardlaw (AUS)	Australia (national team)	+ 1"
3	Eugenia Bujak (POL)	BTC City Ljubljana	+ 2"
4	Esther Fennel (GER)	Germany (national team)	+ 3"
5	Katrin Garfoot (AUS)	Australia (national team)	+ 4"
6	Martina Ritter (AUT)	BTC City Ljubljana	+ 5"
7	Hanka Kupfernagel (GER)	Team Maxx Solar Cycling	+ 6"
8	Mascha Pijnenborg (NED)	Futurumshop Zannata — NWVG	+ 8"
9	Cecilie Gotaas Johnsen (NOR)	Norway (national team)	+ 8"
10	Anna Plichta (POL)	Pacific Toruń	+ 9"

=== Stage 1 ===
2 May 2014 – Dětmarovice to Štramberk, 102.7 km (63.8 mi)

Stage 1 result

	Rider	Team	Time
1	Paulina Brzeźna-Bentkowska (POL)	Pacific Toruń	2h 49' 11"
2	Eugenia Bujak (POL)	BTC City Ljubljana	+ 1"
3	Dalia Muccioli (ITA)	Astana BePink	+ 1"
4	Katrin Garfoot (AUS)	Australia (national team)	+ 4"
5	Natalia Boyarskaya (RUS)	Servetto Footon	+ 6"
6	Mascha Pijnenborg (NED)	Futurumshop Zannata — NWVG	+ 6"
7	Edwige Pitel (FRA)	S.C. Michela Fanini Rox	+ 11"
8	Yevheniya Vysotska (UKR)	S.C. Michela Fanini Rox	+ 13"
9	Anastasiia Iakovenko (RUS)	Russia (national team)	+ 13"
10	Anna Nahirna (UKR)	Ukraine (national team)	+ 13"

General Classification after Stage 1

	Rider	Team	Time
1	Eugenia Bujak (POL)	BTC City Ljubljana	2h 51' 55"
2	Paulina Brzeźna-Bentkowska (POL)	Pacific Toruń	+ 3"
3	Katrin Garfoot (AUS)	Australia (national team)	+ 11"
4	Dalia Muccioli (ITA)	Astana BePink	+ 15"
5	Mascha Pijnenborg (NED)	Futurumshop Zannata — NWVG	+ 17"
6	Natalia Boyarskaya (RUS)	Servetto Footon	+ 22"
7	Anna Plichta (POL)	Pacific Toruń	+ 25"
8	Martina Ritter (AUT)	BTC City Ljubljana	+ 26"
9	Anouska Koster (NED)	Futurumshop Zannata — NWVG	+ 29"
10	Polona Batagelj (SLO)	BTC City Ljubljana	+ 29"

=== Stage 2 ===
3 May 2014 – Lichnov to Lichnov, 110 km (68.4 mi)

Stage 2 result

	Rider	Team	Time
1	Natalia Boyarskaya (RUS)	Servetto Footon	3h 19' 01"
2	Katrin Garfoot (AUS)	Australia (national team)	+ 15"
3	Paulina Brzeźna-Bentkowska (POL)	Pacific Toruń	+ 15"
4	Miriam Bjørnsrud (NOR)	Norway (national team)	+ 21"
5	Eugenia Bujak (POL)	BTC City Ljubljana	+ 24"
6	Anouska Koster (NED)	Futurumshop Zannata — NWVG	+ 24"
7	Kathrin Hammes (GER)	Team Stuttgart	+ 29"
8	Reta Trotman (NZL)	Maxx-Solar	+ 29"
9	Anna Nahirna (UKR)	Ukraine (national team)	+ 29"
10	Aleksandra Chekina (RUS)	Russia (national team)	+ 29"

General Classification after Stage 2

	Rider	Team	Time
1	Natalia Boyarskaya (RUS)	Servetto Footon	6h 11' 08"
2	Paulina Brzeźna-Bentkowska (POL)	Pacific Toruń	+ 2"
3	Katrin Garfoot (AUS)	Australia (national team)	+ 8"
4	Eugenia Bujak (POL)	BTC City Ljubljana	+ 12"
5	Mascha Pijnenborg (NED)	Futurumshop Zannata — NWVG	+ 37"
6	Anouska Koster (NED)	Futurumshop Zannata — NWVG	+ 41"
7	Martina Ritter (AUT)	BTC City Ljubljana	+ 46"
8	Dalia Muccioli (ITA)	Astana BePink	+ 48"
9	Polona Batagelj (SLO)	BTC City Ljubljana	+ 49"
10	Anna Nahirna (UKR)	Ukraine (national team)	+ 51"

=== Stage 3 ===
4 May 2014 – Orlová to Orlová, 100.2 km (62.3 mi)

Stage 3 result

	Rider	Team	Time
1	Paulina Brzeźna-Bentkowska (POL)	Pacific Toruń	2h 37' 30"
2	Katrin Garfoot (AUS)	Australia (national team)	s.t.
3	Eugenia Bujak (POL)	BTC City Ljubljana	s.t.
4	Ivanna Borovychenko (UKR)	Ukraine (national team)	s.t.
5	Aleksandra Chekina (RUS)	Russia (national team)	s.t.
6	Anouska Koster (NED)	Futurumshop Zannata — NWVG	s.t.
7	Daiva Tušlaitė (LTU)	Forno d'Asolo–Astute	s.t.
8	Reta Trotman (NZL)	Maxx-Solar	s.t.
9	Mascha Pijnenborg (NED)	Futurumshop Zannata — NWVG	s.t.
10	Emilie Moberg (NOR)	Norway (national team)	s.t.

Final General Classification

	Rider	Team	Time
1	Paulina Brzeźna-Bentkowska (POL)	Pacific Toruń	8h 48' 27"
2	Katrin Garfoot (AUS)	Australia (national team)	+ 9"
3	Eugenia Bujak (POL)	BTC City Ljubljana	+ 16"
4	Natalia Boyarskaya (RUS)	Servetto Footon	+ 18"
5	Mascha Pijnenborg (NED)	Futurumshop Zannata — NWVG	+ 48"
6	Anouska Koster (NED)	Futurumshop Zannata — NWVG	+ 52"
7	Martina Ritter (AUT)	BTC City Ljubljana	+ 57"
8	Dalia Muccioli (ITA)	Astana BePink	+ 59"
9	Aleksandra Chekina (RUS)	Russia (national team)	+ 1' 01"
10	Edwige Pitel (FRA)	S.C. Michela Fanini Rox	+ 1' 03"

== Classification leadership ==
Stage	Winner	General classification	Mountains classification	Combativity classification	Points classification	Teams classification
P	Rebecca Wiasak	Rebecca Wiasak	not awarded	not awarded	Rebecca Wiasak	Australia (national team)
1	Paulina Brzeźna-Bentkowska	Eugenia Bujak	Katrin Garfoot	Katrin Garfoot	Eugenia Bujak	BTC City Ljubljana
2	Natalia Boyarskaya	Natalia Boyarskaya	Tatyana Ryabchenko	Katrin Garfoot	Paulina Brzeźna-Bentkowska	BTC City Ljubljana
3	Paulina Brzeźna-Bentkowska	Paulina Brzeźna-Bentkowska	Tatyana Ryabchenko	Katrin Garfoot	Paulina Brzeźna-Bentkowska	BTC City Ljubljana
Final Classification		Paulina Brzeźna-Bentkowska	Tatyana Ryabchenko	Katrin Garfoot	Paulina Brzeźna-Bentkowska	BTC City Ljubljana
