= Paulina Brzeźna-Bentkowska =

Polish cyclist (born 1981)

Personal information
- Full name: Paulina Agata Brzeźna-Bentkowska
- Born: Paulina Agata Brzeźna; 10 September 1981 (age 45) Środa Śląska, Poland

Cycling career
- Sport: Cycling
- Current team: MAT Atom Deweloper Wrocław
- Discipline: Road
- Role: Rider (retired); Directeur sportif; Team owner
- Rider type: All-rounder

Amateur teams
- 2005–2006: Peugeot Andrzej Kita
- 2011–2012: Ogniwo Dzierżoniów
- 2012: Dura Vermeer Cycling Team (guest)
- 2013–2015: TKK Pacific Torun–Nestlé Fitness
- 2016–2017: MAT ATOM Sobótka

Professional teams
- 2003–2004: Bonda–Lukowski
- 2007–2008: AA-Drink Cycling Team
- 2009–2010: Red Sun Cycling Team

Managerial team
- 2016–: MAT ATOM Sobótka

Major wins
- Stage races Gracia–Orlová (2014) 3 individual stages (2013, 2014) Single-day races National Road Race Championships (2005, 2008)

Paulina Agata Brzeźna-Bentkowska (née Brzeźna; born 10 September 1981) is a Polish former road racing cyclist, who competed between 2003 and 2017. She is a part-team owner of UCI Women's Continental Team MAT Atom Deweloper Wrocław with her husband, former professional cyclist Paweł Bentkowski, and also acts as a directeur sportif for the team.

During her career, Brzeźna-Bentkowska specialised as an all-rounder, with good climbing performances. She placed high overall and won stages in stage races such as the Tour de Feminin-O cenu Českého Švýcarska and Gracia–Orlová, winning the general classification of the latter in 2014. She competed at the 2008 Summer Olympics, taking 8th place in the elite women road race and marking the most successful result in the history of Polish women's cycling at the time. She won the Polish National Road Race Championships twice, and finished in the top-ten placings in the road race at the 2012 UCI Road World Championships.

== Personal life ==
As well as her husband, Brzeźna-Bentkowska's uncle Jan Brzeźny and sister Monika Brzeźna have competed professionally in cycling.

== Major results ==
1998
3rd Road race, National Road Championships
1999
3rd Road race, National Road Championships
2001
3rd Road race, National Road Championships
2002
3rd Road race, National Road Championships
2003
National Road Championships

2nd Road race
3rd Time trial

8th Trofeo Alfredo Binda-Comune di Cittiglio
2004
2nd Road race, National Road Championships
2005
1st Road race, National Road Championships
2006
National Road Championships

2nd Road race
3rd Time trial

4th Sparkassen Giro
6th Overall Tour Féminin en Limousin
8th Overall Tour de Feminin – Krásná Lípa
2007
6th GP Stad Roeselare
2008
National Road Championships

1st Road race
2nd Time trial

4th Overall Tour Féminin en Limousin

1st Stage 2

8th Road race, Summer Olympics
2009
National Road Championships

2nd Time trial
3rd Road race

2010
2nd Time trial, National Road Championships
2011
2nd Road race, National Road Championships
6th Overall Tour de Feminin-O cenu Českého Švýcarska
7th Overall Gracia–Orlová
2012
2nd Road race, National Road Championships
8th Overall Tour de Bretagne Féminin
10th Road race, UCI Road World Championships
2013
1st Stage 3 Gracia–Orlová
National Road Championships

2nd Road race
3rd Time trial

5th Overall Tour de Feminin-O cenu Českého Švýcarska

1st Mountains classification
1st Stage 1

2014
1st Overall Gracia-Orlová

1st Stages 1 & 3

2015
3rd Road race, National Road Championships
5th Overall Auensteiner–Radsporttage
7th Overall Tour de Feminin-O cenu Českého Švýcarska

1st Stage 1

2016
8th Durango-Durango Emakumeen Saria
9th Overall Tour de Feminin-O cenu Českého Švýcarska
