= Rozanne Slik =

Dutch cyclist (born 1991)

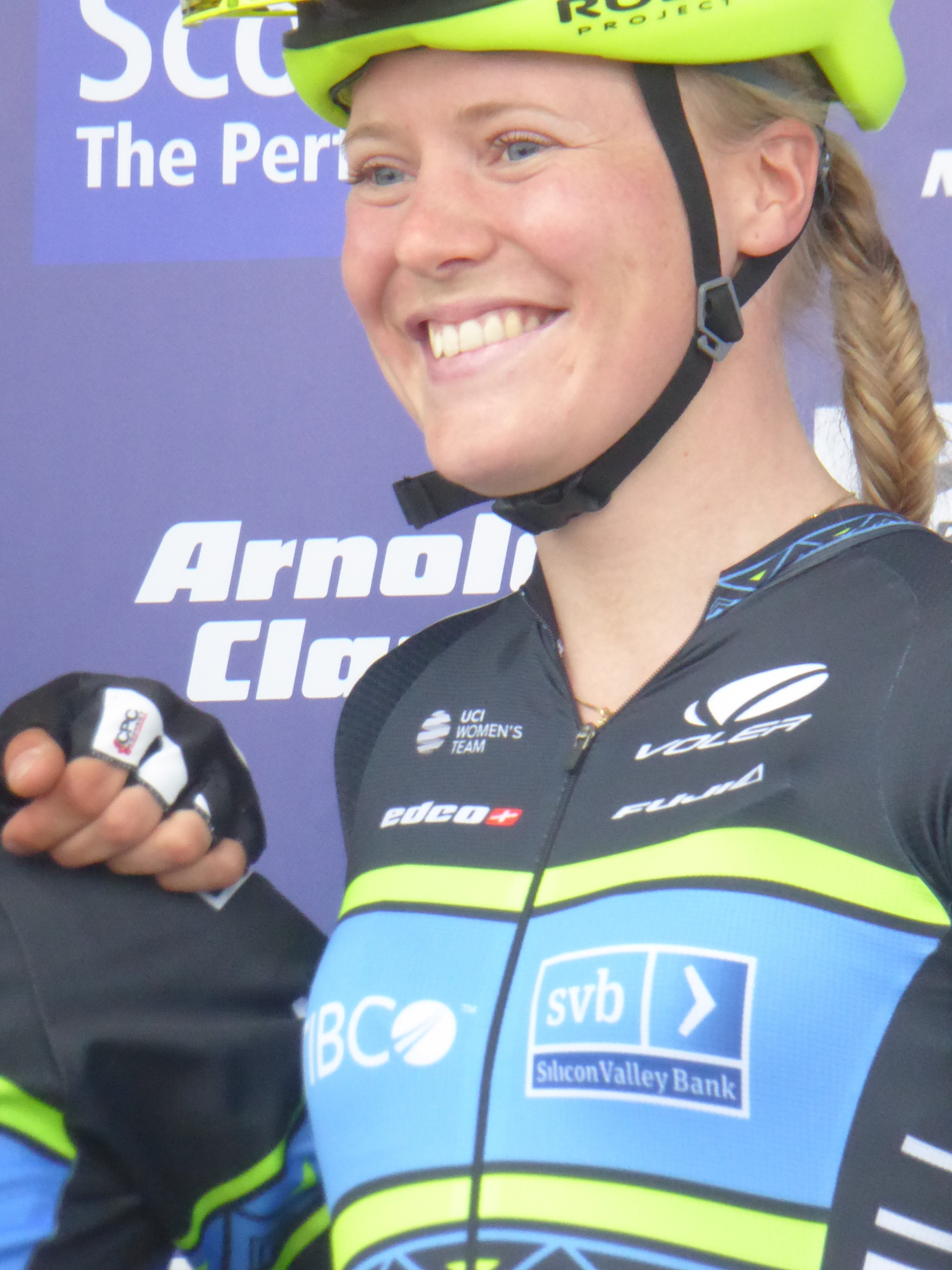
- Slik at the 2019 Women's Tour of Scotland

Personal information
- Full name: Rozanne Slik
- Born: 12 April 1991 (age 35) Bergen, North Holland, Netherlands

Cycling career
- Sport: Cycling
- Current team: KMC Mountainbike Team
- Disciplines: Mountain biking; Road (former)
- Role: Rider
- Rider type: All-rounder

Amateur teams
- 2009–2010: Team Merida–Combee
- 2011: Feenstra–Stevens Bike Team
- 2020–: KMC Mountainbike Team

Professional teams
- 2013–2015: Parkhotel Valkenburg Cycling Team
- 2016–2017: Team Liv–Plantur
- 2018: FDJ Nouvelle-Aquitaine Futuroscope
- 2019: Tibco–Silicon Valley Bank
- 2020–2021: Chevalmeire Cycling Team (road)

Rozanne Slik (born 12 April 1991) is a Dutch racing cyclist, who competes in mountain biking for the KMC Mountainbike Team. Prior to this, Slik also competed in road bicycle racing from 2013 to 2021 for five different UCI Women's Teams – and took two professional victories, winning stages at the 2015 Auensteiner–Radsporttage, and the 2018 Thüringen Rundfahrt der Frauen.

== Personal life ==
She is the sister of racing cyclist Ivar Slik.

== Major results ==
2014
9th Overall Tour of Zhoushan Island
2015
1st Stage 2 Auensteiner–Radsporttage
2016
4th Overall La Route de France
2018
1st Stage 5 Thüringen Rundfahrt der Frauen
9th Grand Prix de Dottignies
2021
3rd Beach race, UEC European Mountain Bike Championships

== See also ==
- 2014 Parkhotel Valkenburg Continental Team season
