= 2013 Dutch National Road Race Championships – Women's road race =

Women's road race
2013 Dutch National Road Race Championships

Race details
- Dates: 22 June 2013
- Stages: 1
- Distance: 114.4 km (71.1 mi)
- Winning time: 3h 12' 28"

Medalists
	Gold	Lucinda Brand	(Rabobank-Liv Giant)
	Silver	Marianne Vos	(Rabobank-Liv Giant)
	Bronze	Annemiek van Vleuten	(Rabobank-Liv Giant)

The Women's road race of the 2013 Dutch National Road Race Championships cycling event took place on 22 June 2013 in and around Kerkrade in the province of Limburg, the Netherlands. The race consisted of 13 laps of 8.8 km, making a total distance of 114.4 km. 28 of the 133 women finished the race.

Lucinda Brand (Rabobank-Liv Giant) rode away from the bunch in the second lap. After losing many riders in the chasing group due to many challenges by the other Rabobank-Liv Giant riders, only the Specialized–lululemon rider Ellen van Dijk, Argos-Shimano rider Amy Pieters and two Rabobank-Liv Giant riders Marianne Vos and Annemiek van Vleuten were together in the front. With a few laps to go, Pieters also could not keep up the pace. Despite the fact that Van Dijk rode really strong in the chasing group, she had to abandon the race due to a broken derailleur in the second last lap. From then on, Vos and Van Vleuten stopped chasing and so Brand won the race.

== Final results (top 10) ==
Rank	Rider	Team	Time
1	Lucinda Brand	Rabobank-Liv Giant	3h 12' 28"
2	Marianne Vos	Rabobank-Liv Giant	+ 28"
3	Annemiek van Vleuten	Rabobank-Liv Giant	+ 29"
4	Amy Pieters	Argos-Shimano	+ 1' 37"
5	Vera Koedooder	Sengers Ladies Cycling Team	+ 1' 38"
6	Thalita de Jong	Rabobank-Liv Giant	+ 1' 40"
7	Loes Gunnewijk	Orica–AIS	+ 1' 42"
8	Sabrina Stultiens	Rabobank-Liv Giant	+ 3' 12"
9	Roxane Knetemann	Rabobank-Liv Giant	+ 5' 56"
10	Adrie Visser	Boels–Dolmans Cycling Team	+ 7' 56"

== See also ==
- 2013 Dutch National Time Trial Championships – Women's time trial
- 2013 national road cycling championships
