= Mariël Borgerink =

Dutch cyclist

Personal information
- Born: 28 March 1992 (age 34) Oldenzaal, Netherlands

Cycling career
- Sport: Cycling
- Role: Rider

Mariël Borgerink (born 28 March 1992) is a Dutch professional racing cyclist. She rides for the Lensworld.eu-Zannata team.

== See also ==
- List of 2015 UCI Women's Teams and riders
