= 2014 Parkhotel Valkenburg Continental Team season =

2014 Parkhotel Valkenburg Continental Team
- UCI Team ranking: 24th

Season victories
- One-day races: 0
- Stage race overall: 0
- Stage race stages: 0
- Best ranked rider: Kim de Baat (133rd)

The 2014 women's road cycling season was the first for the Parkhotel Valkenburg Continental Team as an UCI women's team. It was the second year for the team which began as Parkhotel Valkenburg p/y Math Salden in 2013.

== Roster ==
As of 1 January 2014. Ages as of 1 January 2014.

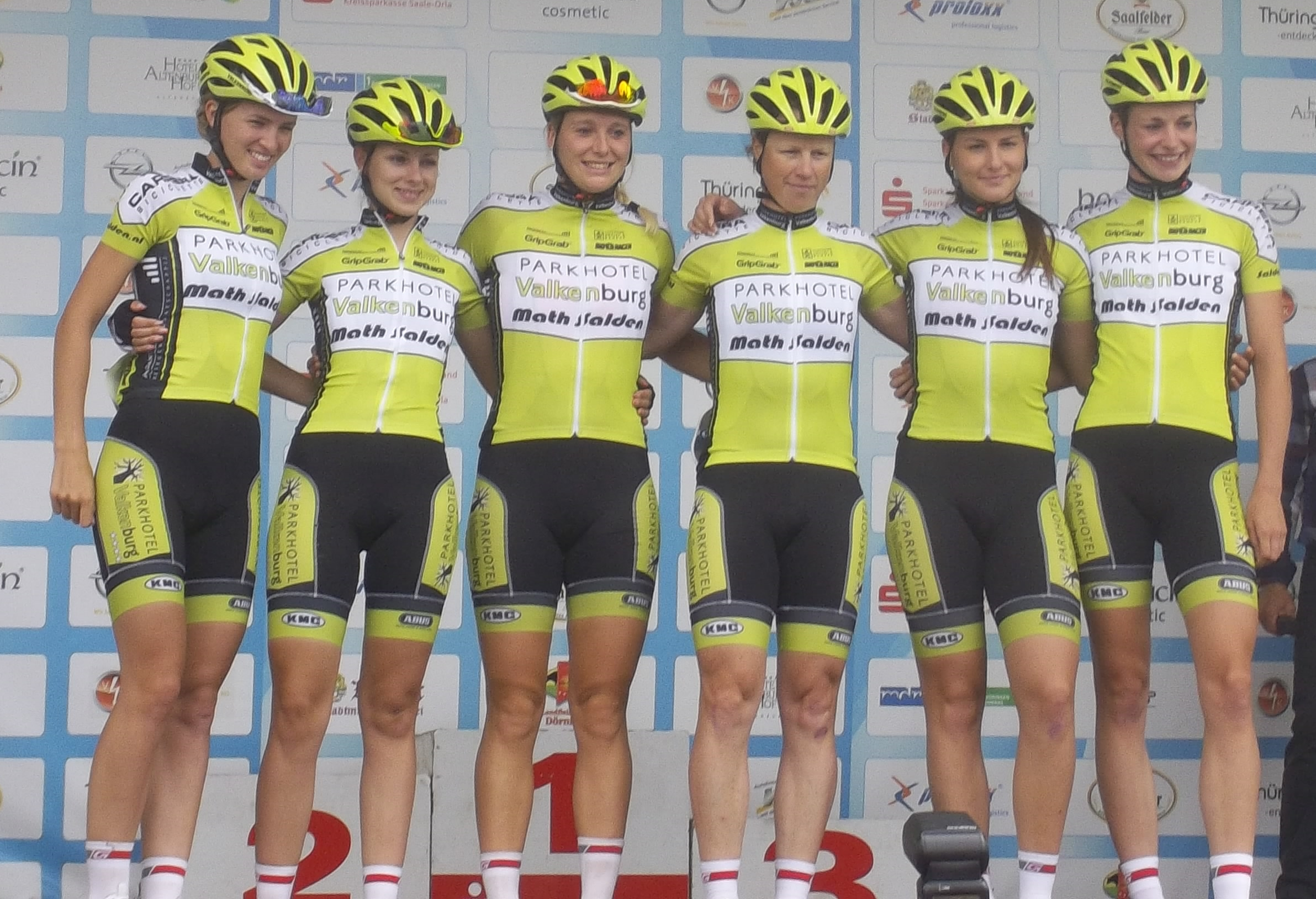
Six riders of the team at the 2014 Thüringen Rundfahrt der Frauen.

| Rider | Date of birth |
|---|---|
| Kim de Baat (NED) | May 29, 1991 (aged 22) |
| Sophie de Boer (NED) | December 12, 1990 (aged 23) |
| Aafke Eshuis (NED) | November 24, 1987 (aged 26) |
| Natalie van Gogh (NED) | September 14, 1974 (aged 39) |
| Bianca van den Hoek (NED) | July 28, 1976 (aged 37) |
| Ilona Hoeksma (NED) | May 22, 1991 (aged 22) |
| Riejanne Markus (NED) | September 1, 1994 (aged 19) |
| Marissa Otten (NED) | July 11, 1989 (aged 24) |

| Rider | Date of birth |
|---|---|
| Kirsten Peetoom (NED) | October 1, 1981 (aged 32) |
| Jermaine Post (NED) | June 10, 1992 (aged 21) |
| Monique van de Ree (NED) | March 2, 1988 (aged 25) |
| Pauliena Rooijakkers (Note: Rooijakkers joined the team on 9 February.) (NED) | May 12, 1993 (aged 20) |
| Rozanne Slik (NED) | April 12, 1991 (aged 22) |
| Lisanne Soemanta (NED) | May 1, 1987 (aged 26) |
| Esra Tromp (NED) | October 15, 1990 (aged 23) |

Riders who stayed from the 2013 non-UCI team are (all Dutch): Aafke Eshuis, Sophie de Boer, Bianca van den Hoek, Ilona Hoeksma, Riejanne Markus, Jermaine Post, Rozanne Slik, Lisanne Soemanta.

In

| Rider | From |
|---|---|
| Kim de Baat (NED) | Boels–Dolmans |
| Natalie van Gogh (NED) | |
| Marissa Otten (NED) | Cyclelive-Zanatta |
| Kirsten Peetoom (NED) | |
| Monique van de Ree (NED) | Cyclelive-Zanatta |
| Esra Tromp (NED) | Argos–Shimano |

== Results in major races ==
=== Single day races ===
Results at the World Cup races
| Date | # | Race | Best rider | Place |
|---|---|---|---|---|
| 15 March | 1 | Ronde van Drenthe | - | - |
| 30 March | 2 | Trofeo Alfredo Binda-Comune di Cittiglio | - | - |
| 6 April | 3 | Tour of Flanders | (Netherlands) Kim de Baat | 33rd |
| 23 April | 4 | La Flèche Wallonne Féminine | (Netherlands) Pauliena Rooijakkers | 41st |
| 18 May | 5 | Tour of Chongming Island | (Netherlands) Kim de Baat | 15th |
| 3 August | 6 | Sparkassen Giro | (Netherlands) Slik Rozanne | 31st |
| 22 August | 7 | Open de Suède Vårgårda TTT | Parkhotel Valkenburg Continental Team | 11th |
| 24 August | 8 | Open de Suède Vårgårda | (Netherlands) Jermaine Post | 20th |
| 30 August | 9 | GP de Plouay | - | - |
| Final individual classification | | | (Netherlands) Kim de Baat | 69th |
| Final team classification | | | Parkhotel Valkenburg Continental Team | 16th |

Other major single day races
| Date | Race | Best rider | Place |
|---|---|---|---|
| 27 July | La Course by Le Tour de France | - | - |
| 21 September | UCI Road World Championships – Women's team time trial | - | - |
| 23 September | UCI Road World Championships – Women's time trial (Note: Riders are part of the national team) | - | - |
| 27 September | UCI Road World Championships – Women's road race (Note: Riders are part of the national team) | - | - |

=== Grand Tours ===
Results of the team in the grand tours
| Grand tour | Giro d'Italia Femminile |
|---|---|
| Rider (classification) | - |
| Victories | —N/a |

== UCI World Ranking ==
The 2014 UCI Women's Road Rankings are rankings based upon the results in all UCI-sanctioned races of the 2014 women's road cycling season.

Parkhotel Valkenburg Continental Team finished 24th in the 2014 ranking for UCI teams.

Individual world ranking
| Rank | Rider | Points |
|---|---|---|
| 133 | (Netherlands) Kim de Baat | 39 |
| 145 | (Netherlands) Natalie van Gogh | 35 |
| 213 | (Netherlands) Rozanne Slik | 15 |
| 417 | (Netherlands) Monique van de Ree | 5 |
| 417 | (Netherlands) Pauliena Rooijakkers | 5 |
| 443 | (Netherlands) Riejanne Markus | 4 |
| 443 | (Netherlands) Bianca van den Hoek | 4 |
| 526 | (Netherlands) Jermaine Post | 2 |
