= Anouk Rijff =

Dutch cyclist (born 1996)

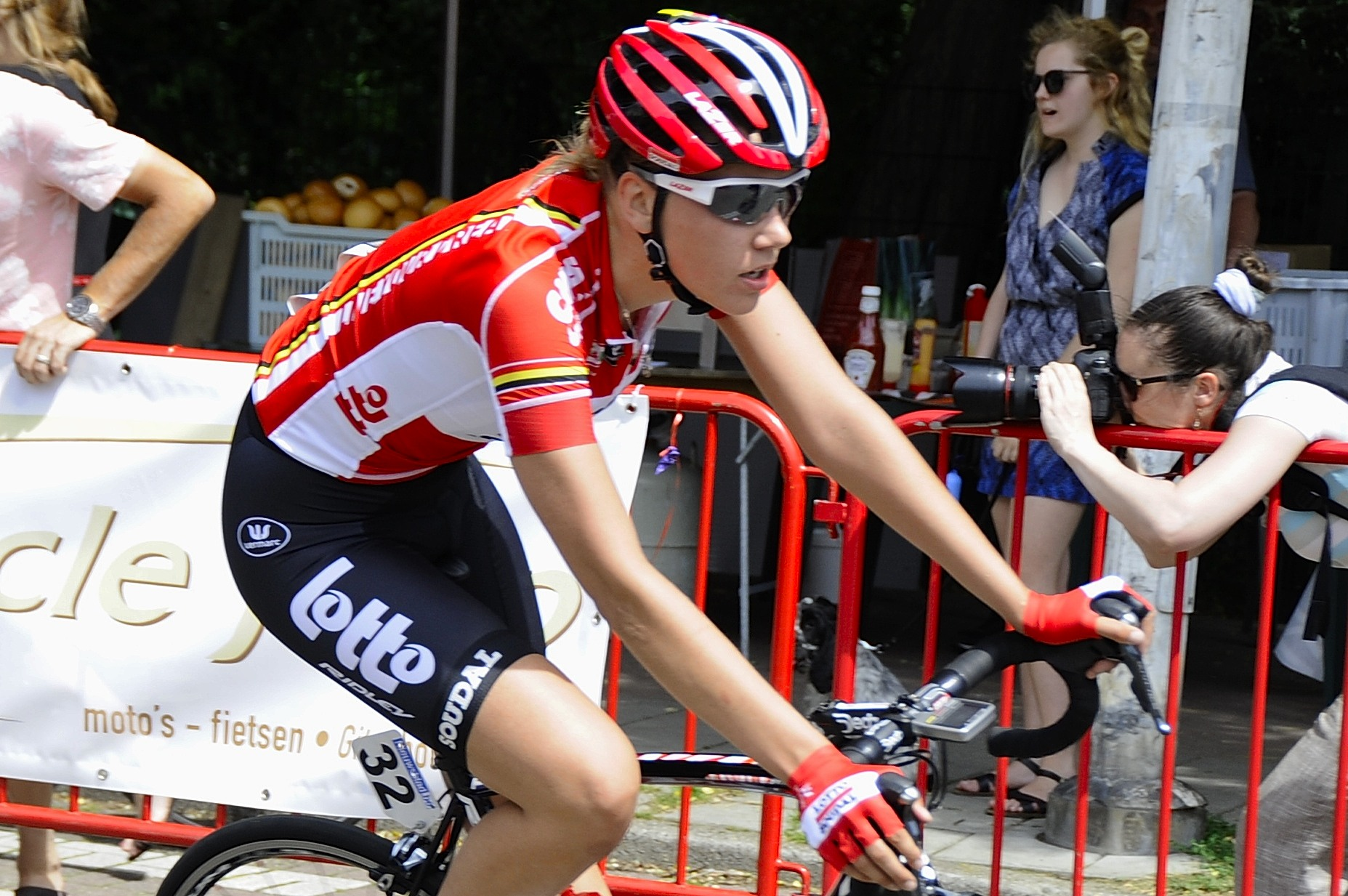
- Anouk Rijff in 2016

Personal information
- Born: 6 April 1996 (age 30) Tiel, Netherlands

Cycling career
- Sport: Cycling
- Role: Rider

Amateur team
- 2014: TWC Het Snelle Wiel

Professional teams
- 2015–2016: Lotto–Soudal Ladies
- 2017: Lensworld-Kuota

Anouk Rijff (born 6 April 1996) is a retired Dutch professional racing cyclist. In 2015 and 2016 she rode for the Lotto–Soudal Ladies team and for Lensworld-Kuota in 2017.

As a junior, she represented the Netherlands at the 2013 European Road Championships and at the 2014 European Road Championships in the women's junior road race. In 2017 she didn't race because of a chronic deficiency of vitamins. This was also the reason why she ended her cycling career in October 2017.
