= 2018 Thüringen Rundfahrt der Frauen =

Race details
- Dates: 28 May–3 June
- Stages: 7 stages
- Distance: 559.8 km (347.8 mi)

The 2018 Thüringen Rundfahrt der Frauen (also known as the Internationalen LOTTO Thüringen Ladies Tour for sponsorship reasons) was the 31st edition of the Thüringen Rundfahrt der Frauen, a women's cycling stage race in Germany. It was rated by the Union Cycliste Internationale as a category 2.1 race and was held from 28 May to 3 June 2018.

== Schedule ==
List of stages
Stage	Date	Course	Distance	Type	Winner
1	28 May	Schleusingen to Schleusingen	82.5 km (51.3 mi)	Flat stage	Coryn Rivera (USA)
2	29 May	Meiningen to Meiningen	136 km (84.5 mi)	Flat stage	Elena Cecchini (ITA)
3	30 May	Schleiz to Schleiz	131 km (81.4 mi)	Flat stage	Coryn Rivera (USA)
4	31 May	Gera to Gera	118 km (73.3 mi)	Flat stage	Lisa Brennauer (GER)
5	1 June	Dörtendorf to Dörtendorf	105.6 km (65.6 mi)	Hilly stage	Rozanne Slik (NED)
6	2 June	Gotha to Gotha	142 km (88.2 mi)	Hilly stage	Alice Barnes (GBR)
7	3 June	Schmölln to Schmölln	18.7 km (11.6 mi)	Individual time trial	Ellen van Dijk (NED)
Total			733.8 km (456.0 mi)		

== Classification leadership table ==
In the 2018 Thüringen Rundfahrt der Frauen, six different jerseys were awarded. The most important was the general classification, which was calculated by adding each cyclist's finishing times on each stage. Time bonuses were awarded to the first three finishers on all mass-start stages: the stage winner won a ten-second bonus, with six and four seconds for the second and third riders respectively. Bonus seconds were also awarded to the first three riders at intermediate sprints; three seconds for the winner of the sprint, two seconds for the rider in second and one second for the rider in third. The rider with the least accumulated time is the race leader, identified by a yellow jersey. This classification was considered the most important of the 2017 Thüringen Rundfahrt der Frauen, and the winner of the classification was considered the winner of the race.

Points for the mountains classification
Position	1	2	3	4
Points for Category 1	7	5	3	2
Points for Category 2	5	3	2	0
Points for Category 3	3	2	1	0

There was also a mountains classification, the leadership of which was marked by a black, white and yellow jersey. In the mountains classification, points towards the classification were won by reaching the top of a climb before other cyclists. Each climb was categorised as either first, second, or third-category, with more points available for the higher-categorised climbs. First-category climbs awarded the most points; the first four riders were able to accrue points, compared with the first three on all other climbs.

Additionally, there was a sprints classification, which awarded a blue jersey. In the sprints classification, cyclists received points for finishing in the top 5 in a stage, except the time trials. For winning a stage, a rider earned 5 points, with 4 for second, 3 for third, 2 for fourth and a single point for 5th place. Points were also awarded at intermediate sprints on each mass-start stage – awarded on a 3–2–1 scale. The fourth jersey represented the young rider classification, marked by a red and white jersey. This was decided the same way as the general classification, but only riders born on or after 1 January 1995 were eligible to be ranked in the classification.

The fifth jersey represented the classification for German riders, marked by a white and blue jersey. This was decided on each day's stage results, but only riders born in Germany were eligible to be ranked in the classification. The sixth and final jersey (coloured white and green) was for the most active rider, decided daily by a race jury. A purple jersey, presented on the podium only, was also given to amateur riders. There was also a team classification, in which the times of the best three cyclists per team on each stage were added together; the leading team at the end of the race was the team with the lowest total time.

Stage	Winner	General classification	Sprints classification	Mountains classification	Young rider classification	Active rider classification	German rider classification	Best amateur rider classification	Team classification
1<ref[>http://www.lottothueringen-ladies-tour.de/1-etappe-in-schleusingen/ Ladies Tour Etappe 1] </ref>	Coryn Rivera	Coryn Rivera	Ellen van Dijk	Kathrin Hammes	Alba Teruel	Margarita Syradoeva	Lisa Brennauer	Stine Borgli	Team Sunweb
2	Elena Cecchini	Coryn Rivera	Ellen van Dijk	Kathrin Hammes	Alba Teruel	Mia Radotic	Lisa Brennauer	Demi Vollering	Team Sunweb
3	Coryn Rivera	Coryn Rivera	Coryn Rivera	Kathrin Hammes	Alba Teruel	Tatjana Paller	Lisa Brennauer	Katarzyna Wilkos	Team Sunweb
4	Lisa Brennauer	Coryn Rivera	Coryn Rivera	Kathrin Hammes	Alba Teruel	Lianne Lippert	Lisa Brennauer	Michaela Ebert	Team Sunweb
5	Rozanne Slik	Lisa Brennauer	Coryn Rivera	Kathrin Hammes	Lianne Lippert	Trixi Worrack	Lisa Brennauer	Demi Vollering	Wiggle High5
6	Alice Barnes	Lisa Brennauer	Coryn Rivera	Kathrin Hammes	Lianne Lippert	Jacqueline Dietrich	Lisa Brennauer	Beate Zanner	Team Sunweb
7	Ellen van Dijk	Lisa Brennauer	Coryn Rivera	Kathrin Hammes	Lianne Lippert		Lisa Brennauer	Hannah Ludwig	Team Sunweb
Final		Lisa Brennauer	Coryn Rivera	Kathrin Hammes	Lianne Lippert		Lisa Brennauer		Team Sunweb

== See also ==
- Thüringen Rundfahrt der Frauen
- 2018 in women's road cycling
