= Taryn Heather =

Australian cyclist (born 1982)

Personal information
- Full name: Taryn Heather
- Born: 31 August 1982 (age 44) Australia

Cycling career
- Sport: Cycling
- Current team: Specialized Women's Racing
- Discipline: Road
- Role: Rider

Amateur teams
- 2012–2013: Jayco–AIS
- 2015: Bicycle Superstore
- 2016: Bikebug–NextGen
- 2017–2018: Mildura–Coomealla CC
- 2018–: Specialized Women's Racing

Professional team
- 2014: Bigla Cycling Team

Taryn Heather (born 31 August 1982) is an Australian racing cyclist. She rode at the 2014 UCI Road World Championships.

== Major results ==
2011
2nd Time trial, National Road Championships
4th Time trial, Oceania Road Championships
6th Memorial Davide Fardelli
8th Overall Tour de Feminin-O cenu Českého Švýcarska
2012
2nd Time trial, National Road Championships
3rd Overall Women's Tour of New Zealand
10th Chrono Champenois
2013
1st Time trial, Oceania Road Championships
6th Overall Tour de Feminin-O cenu Českého Švýcarska
7th Chrono Champenois – Trophée Européen
2014
3rd Nagrada Ljubljane TT
10th Overall Auensteiner–Radsporttage
2015
3rd Time trial, National Road Championships
6th Time trial, Oceania Road Championships
2019
8th Overall Women's Tour Down Under
1st Peaks Challenge Falls Creek
