= Martina Ritter =

Austrian cyclist (born 1982)

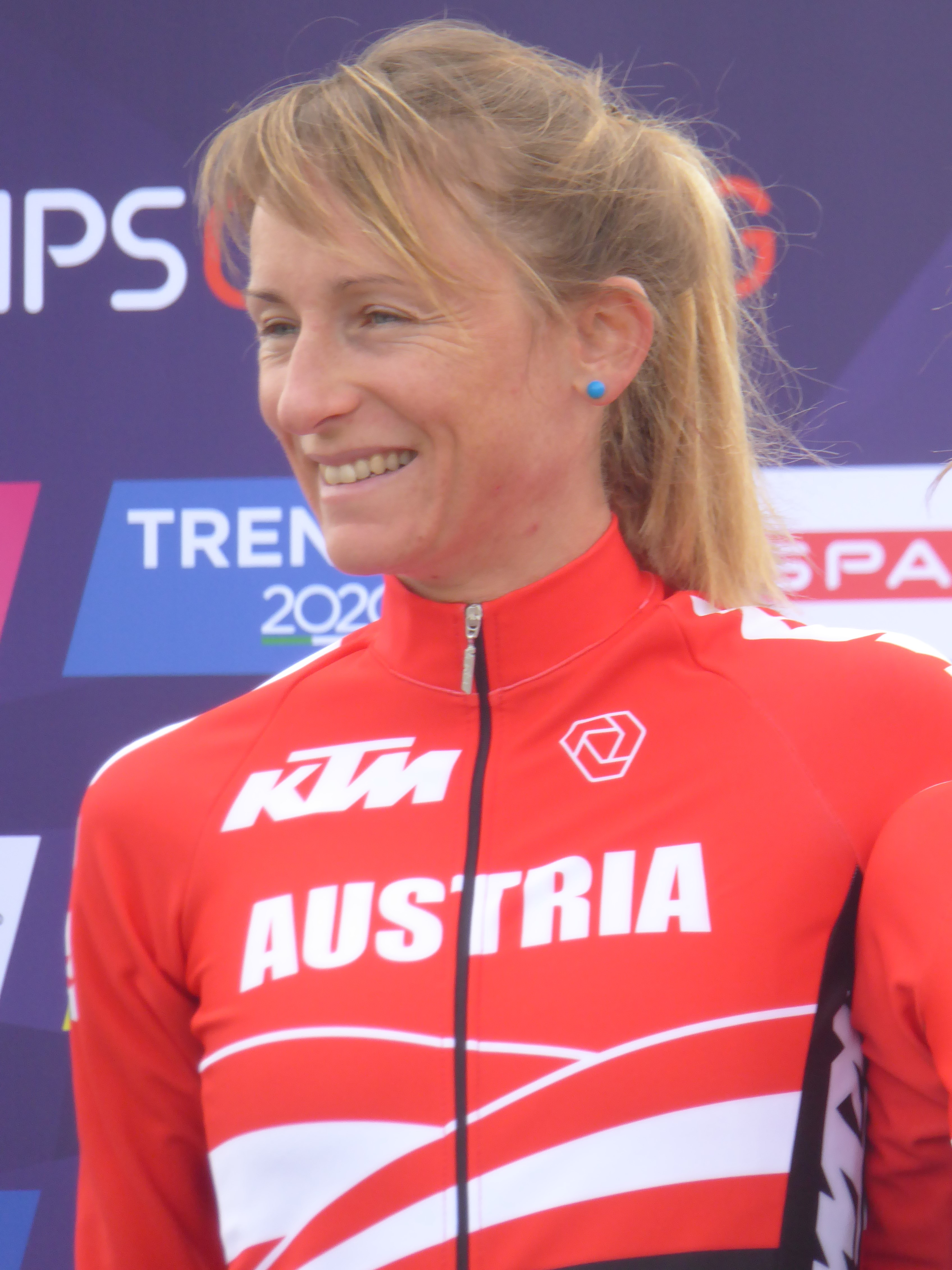
- Ritter at the 2018 European Road Cycling Championships.

Personal information
- Full name: Martina Ritter
- Born: 23 September 1982 (age 44) Linz, Austria

Cycling career
- Sport: Cycling
- Current team: Retired
- Discipline: Road
- Role: Rider
- Rider type: Time trialist

Professional teams
- 2014–2016: BTC City Ljubljana
- 2017: Drops
- 2018: Wiggle High5

Martina Ritter (born 23 September 1982) is an Austrian former racing cyclist. She competed in the 2013 UCI women's road race in Florence. She won the Austrian National Road Race Championships in 2015 and 2017 and she was six times national time trial champion.

In October 2017 it was announced that Ritter would ride for Wiggle High5 in 2018. It was initially announced that Ritter had retired from competition at the end of that year, but she contested the 2019 Gracia–Orlová, finishing ninth overall for an Austrian national team. She retired at the end of the season.

== Major results ==
2012
National Road Championships

2nd Road race
2nd Time trial

2nd Memorial Davide Fardelli
3rd Overall Tour de Feminin-O cenu Českého Švýcarska
2013
National Road Championships

1st Time trial
2nd Road race

3rd Overall Tour de Feminin – O cenu Ceského Švýcarska
9th Chrono Champenois – Trophée Européen
2014
National Road Championships

1st Time trial
3rd Road race

1st Nagrada Ljubljane TT
2nd Overall Auensteiner–Radsporttage
5th GP du Canton d'Argovie
7th Overall Gracia-Orlová
2015
National Road Championships

1st Road race
1st Time trial

5th Time trial, European Games
5th Overall Tour de Feminin-O cenu Českého Švýcarska
5th Chrono Champenois
6th Overall Auensteiner–Radsporttage
8th Overall Thüringen Rundfahrt der Frauen
8th GP du Canton d'Argovie
10th Ljubljana–Domžale–Ljubljana TT
2016
National Road Championships

1st Time trial
2nd Road race

6th La Classique Morbihan
10th Overall Giro della Toscana Int. Femminile – Memorial Michela Fanini
10th Ljubljana–Domžale–Ljubljana TT
2017
National Road Championships

1st Road race
1st Time trial

4th Overall Gracia–Orlová

1st Stage 4

4th Overall Tour Cycliste Féminin International de l'Ardèche
5th Time trial, UEC European Road Championships
9th Overall Tour of California
Combativity award, Stage 3 The Women's Tour
2018
1st Time trial, National Road Championships
2019
6th Ljubljana–Domžale–Ljubljana TT
9th Overall Gracia–Orlová
