= Team Pratomagno Women =

UCI cycling team

Team information
- UCI code: TPW
- Registered: Uzbekistan
- Founded: 2013
- Disbanded: 2013
- Discipline: Road
- Status: UCI Women's Team
- Website: Team home page

Key personnel
- Team manager: Ilio Donnini

Team name history
- 2013: Team Pratomagno Women

Team Pratomagno Women (UCI team code: TPW) was a women's UCI cycling team based in Uzbekistan, which competed in elite road bicycle racing events such as the UCI Women's Road World Cup. The team only existed in the 2013 women's road cycling season.

== Major wins ==
2013
Grand Prix of Maykop, Natalia Boyarskaya
Overall Tour of Adygeya, Natalia Boyarskaya

Stages 2 & 4, Natalia Boyarskaya

== National champions ==
2013
Uzbekistan National Road Championship, Olga Drobysheva
Russia National Road Championship, Svetlana Stolbova
Uzbekistan National Time Trial Championship, Olga Drobysheva
