= Marissa Otten =

Dutch cyclist

Personal information
- Born: 11 July 1989 (age 37) Enter, Netherlands

Cycling career
- Sport: Cycling
- Current team: Retired
- Discipline: Road
- Role: Rider

Professional teams
- 2011–2012: Dolmans Landscaping Team
- 2013: Cyclelive Plus–Zannata
- 2014: Parkhotel Valkenburg Continental Team
- 2015: Lensworld.eu–Zannata

Marissa Otten (born 11 July 1989) is a Dutch former professional racing cyclist. She retired in August 2015.

== See also ==
- 2014 Parkhotel Valkenburg Continental Team season
