= Jermaine Post =

Dutch cyclist (born 1992)

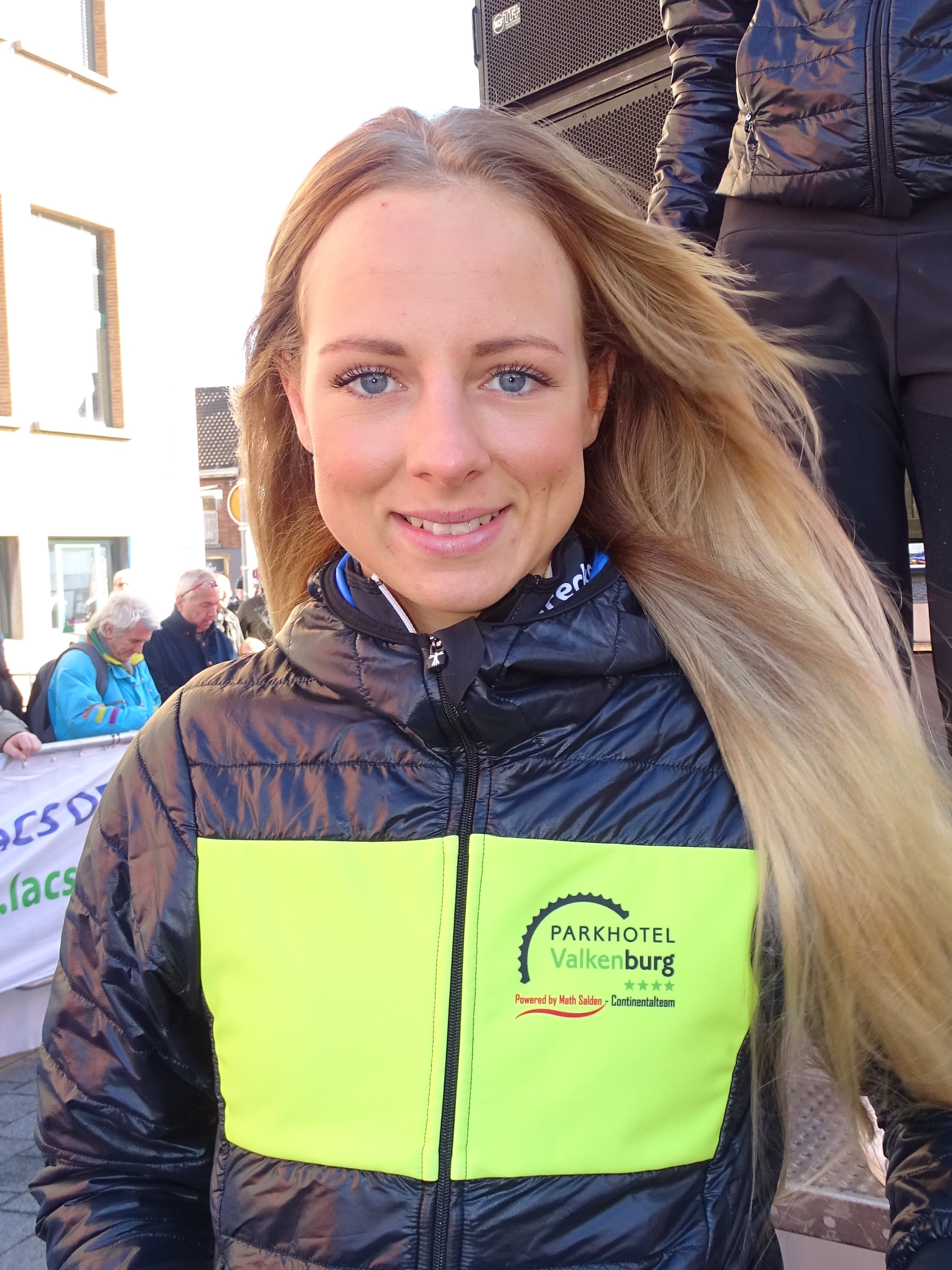

Personal information
- Born: 10 June 1992 (age 34) Oegstgeest, Netherlands

Cycling career
- Sport: Cycling
- Role: Rider

Jermaine Post (born 10 June 1992) is a Dutch professional racing cyclist.

== See also ==
- 2014 Parkhotel Valkenburg Continental Team season
