= Janine van der Meer =

Dutch cyclist (born 1994)

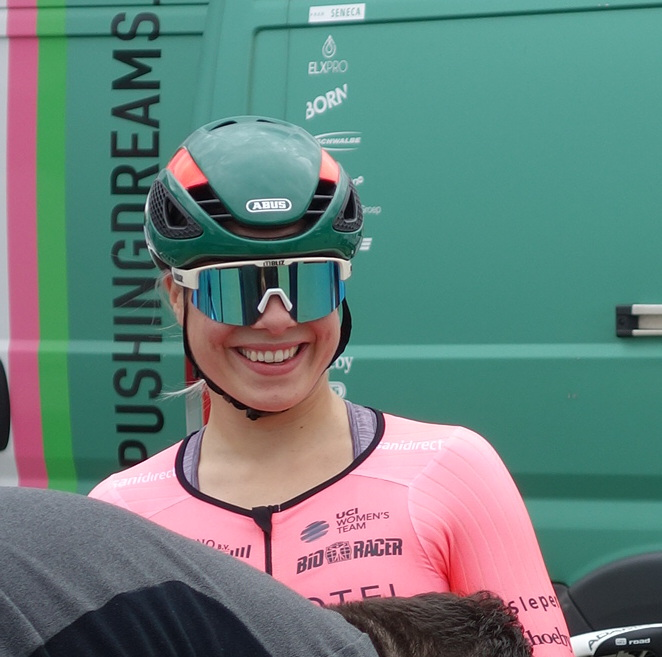
- Van der Meer in the 2019 Holland Ladies Tour

Personal information
- Full name: Janine van der Meer
- Born: 17 February 1994 (age 32)

Cycling career
- Sport: Cycling
- Current team: Retired
- Discipline: Road
- Role: Rider

Professional teams
- 2013–2014: Team Futurumshop.nl–Polaris
- 2018: Health Mate–Cyclelive Team
- 2019: Parkhotel Valkenburg

Janine van der Meer (born 17 February 1994) is a Dutch former professional racing cyclist, who rode professionally between 2013 and 2014, and 2018 to 2019 for the Futurumshop.nl–Zannata, Health Mate–Cyclelive Team and Parkhotel Valkenburg teams.

== Major results ==
2018
1st Flanders Diamond Tour
2nd GP Sofie Goos
5th Omloop van de IJsseldelta
10th Overall Tour of Uppsala
10th Overall Erondegemse Pijl
2019
8th Flanders Diamond Tour
