= Lisanne Soemanta =

Dutch cyclist

Personal information
- Born: 1 May 1987 (age 39) Uitgeest, Netherlands

Cycling career
- Sport: Cycling
- Role: Rider

Lisanne Soemanta (born 1 May 1987) is a Dutch professional racing cyclist.

== See also ==
- 2014 Parkhotel Valkenburg Continental Team season
