= Elizaveta Oshurkova =

Russian cyclist (born 1991)

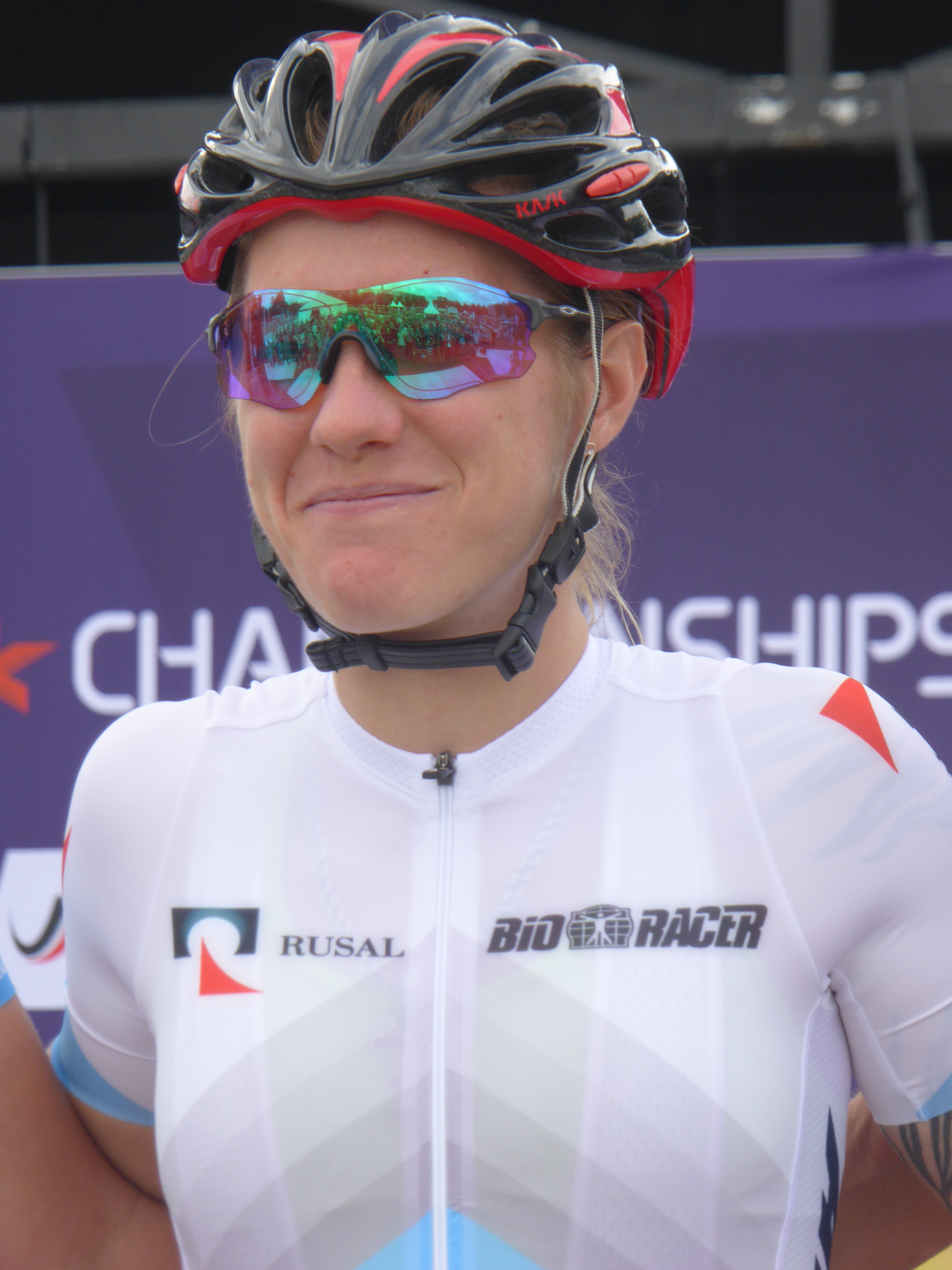
- Oshurkova at the 2018 European Road Cycling Championships.

Personal information
- Full name: Elizaveta Vasilyevna Oshurkova
- Born: 19 June 1991 (age 35)

Cycling career
- Sport: Cycling
- Discipline: Road
- Role: Rider

Professional teams
- 2014: Servetto Footon
- 2018–2019: Cogeas–Mettler Pro Cycling Team

Elizaveta Vasilyevna Oshurkova (Russian: Елизавета Васильевна Ошуркова; born 19 June 1991) is a Ukrainian-born Russian racing cyclist, who last rode for UCI Women's Team Cogeas–Mettler–Look.

== Career ==
In 2009, she won bronze at the 2009 UEC European Track Championships in junior women's team pursuit. She competed in the 2013 UCI women's road race in Florence.

In July 2016, Oshurkova started competing for Russia.
