= Lauren Arnouts =

Dutch cyclist (born 1994)

Personal information
- Full name: Lauren Arnouts
- Born: 9 November 1994 (age 31)

Cycling career
- Sport: Cycling
- Current team: Retired
- Discipline: Road
- Role: Rider

Amateur teams
- 2013: Restore Cycling Ladies
- 2014: De Jonge Renner Ladies
- 2015: Euregio Ladies Cycling Team

Professional team
- 2016: Bizkaia–Durango

Lauren Arnouts (born 9 November 1994) is a Dutch former professional racing cyclist.

== See also ==
- List of 2016 UCI Women's Teams and riders
