= Esther Fennel =

German cyclist (born 1981)

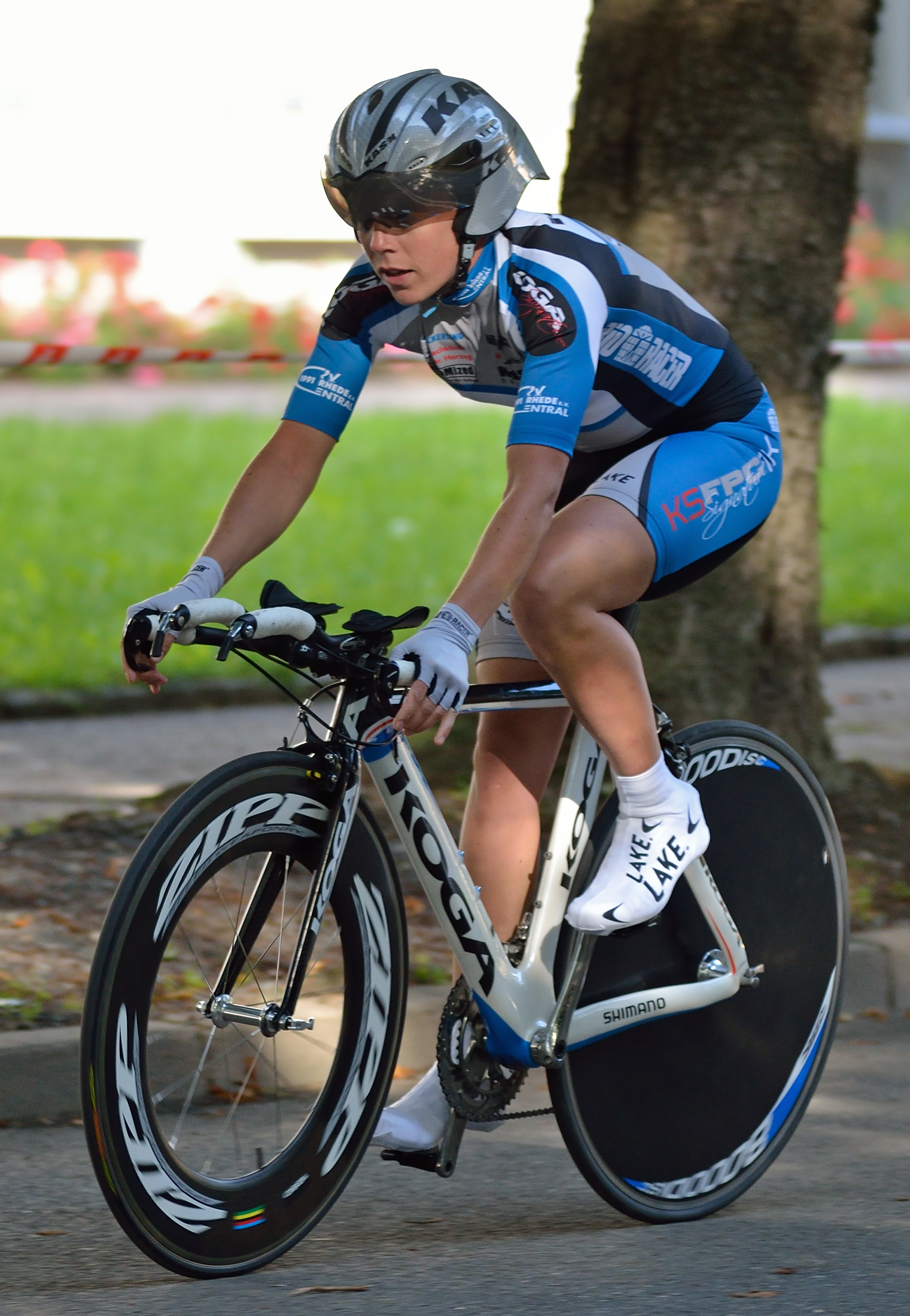
- Fennel at the 2012 Thüringen Rundfahrt der Frauen

Personal information
- Born: 31 December 1981 (age 44)

Cycling career
- Sport: Cycling
- Current team: Retired
- Discipline: Road
- Role: Rider

Professional team
- Koga Ladies-Central Rhede Cycling Team

Esther Fennel (born 31 December 1981) is a German former racing cyclist. She was champion of the Bavarian Mountain Championships in 2009 and 2011, and of the North Rhine-Westphalian Road Championships in 2012. She competed in the 2013 UCI women's road race in Florence. Her cycling career finished in 2014.
