= Marieke van Wanroij =

Personal information
- Born: 5 July 1979 (age 47) Nijmegen

Cycling career
- Sport: Cycling
- Role: Rider

Marieke van Wanroij (born 5 July 1979) is a Dutch professional racing cyclist.

== See also ==
- 2014 Boels Dolmans Cycling Team season
