= Bianca van den Hoek =

Dutch cyclist (born 1976)

Personal information
- Born: 28 July 1976 (age 50) Soest, Netherlands

Cycling career
- Sport: Cycling
- Disciplines: Road; Cyclo-cross
- Role: Rider

Amateur teams
- 2008: GWC De Adelaar
- 2009–2012: Merida Ladies Cycling Team
- 2009: Rabo Lady Force (guest)
- 2013: Parkhotel Valkenburg Cycling Team
- 2016–2018: Team Rijwielpaleis Bilthoven

Professional team
- 2014–2015: Parkhotel Valkenburg Continental Team

Bianca van den Hoek (born 28 July 1976) is a Dutch racing cyclist.

== See also ==
- 2014 Parkhotel Valkenburg Continental Team season
