= Tour de Feminin – O cenu Českého Švýcarska =

Tour de Feminin-O cenu Českého Švýcarska
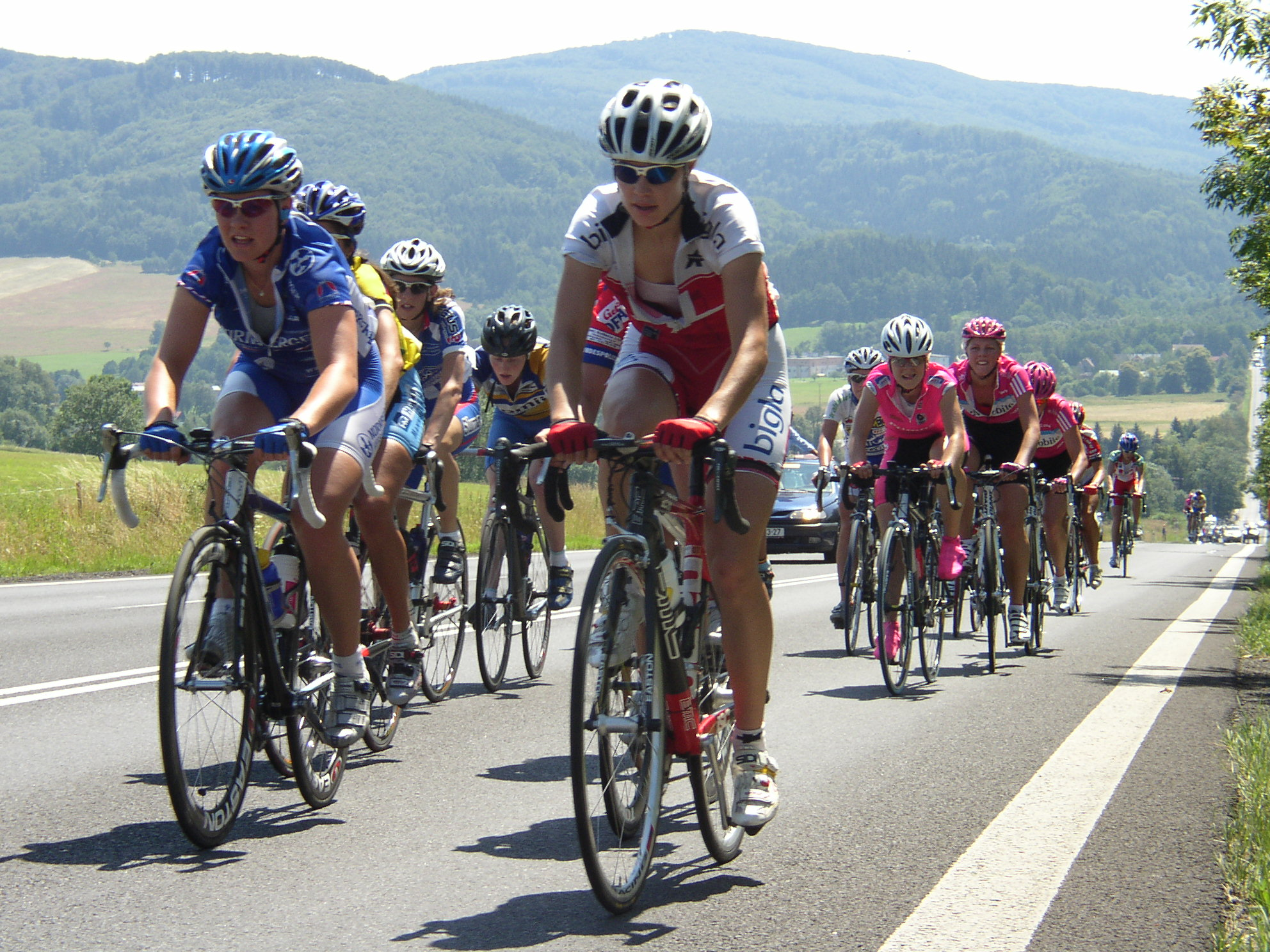
- Tour de Feminin 2007

Race details
- Date: July
- Region: Czech Republic
- Type: Stage race
- Web site: www.tourdefeminin.com/en/

History
- First edition: 1988
- Editions: 34 (as of 2024)
- First winner: Valentyna Karpenko (UKR)
- Most wins: Trixi Worrack (GER) (2 wins)
- Most recent: Julia Kopecký (CZE)

Tour de Feminin – O cenu Českého Švýcarska (Tour de Feminin – Krásná Lípa) is a women's stage cycle race which takes place in the Czech Republic and is rated by the UCI as a 2.2 race.

The race was first held in 1988, and is held in and around the Czech town of Krásná Lípa.

== Honours ==
| Year | Winner | Second | Third |
|---|---|---|---|
| 2003 | (Ukraine) Valentyna Karpenko | | |
| 2004 | (Germany) Trixi Worrack | (Netherlands) Chantal Beltman | (Germany) Theresa Senff |
| 2005 | (Germany) Tina Liebig | (Poland) Bogumiła Matusiak | (Germany) Eva Lutz |
| 2006 | (Germany) Theresa Senff | (Czech Republic) Lada Kozlíková | (Germany) Hanka Kupfernagel |
| 2007 | (Germany) Hanka Kupfernagel | (Austria) Andrea Graus | (France) Edwige Pitel |
| 2008 | (Germany) Angela Brodtka-Hennig | (Germany) Trixi Worrack | (Germany) Sarah Düster |
| 2009 | (Russia) Alexandra Burchenkova | (France) Edwige Pitel | (Czech Republic) Martina Růžičková |
| 2010 | (Germany) Trixi Worrack | (Russia) Alexandra Burchenkova | (Germany) Sarah Düster |
| 2011 | (Australia) Amanda Spratt | (Russia) Natalia Boyarskaya | (Russia) Larisa Pankova |
| 2012 | (Russia) Larisa Pankova | (Australia) Carla Ryan | (Austria) Martina Ritter |
| 2013 | (Australia) Amy Cure | (United Kingdom) Emma Pooley | (Austria) Martina Ritter |
| 2014 | (United States) Brianna Walle | (Czech Republic) Martina Sáblíková | (Netherlands) Vera Koedooder |
| 2015 | (Russia) Tatiana Antoshina | (United States) Lauren Stephens | (Poland) Anna Plichta |
| 2016 | (Denmark) Cecilie Uttrup Ludwig | (Poland) Anna Plichta | (Russia) Natalia Boyarskaya |
| 2017 | (United States) Ruth Winder | (United States) Tayler Wiles | (Belgium) Ann-Sophie Duyck |
| 2018 | (United States) Leah Thomas | (Russia) Elizaveta Oshurkova | (Belgium) Sofie De Vuyst |
| 2019 | (Norway) Vita Heine | (Poland) Aurela Nerlo | (Russia) Elizaveta Oshurkova |
| 2020 | No race due to COVID-19 pandemic | | |
| 2021 | (United Kingdom) Joss Lowden | (France) Morgane Coston | (Germany) Corinna Lechner |
| 2023 | (Ukraine) Olha Kulynych | (Poland) Dominika Wlodarczyk | (Czech Republic) Eliška Kvasničková |
| 2024 | (Czech Republic) Julia Kopecký | (Netherlands) Mirre Knaven | (Netherlands) Femke de Vries |
| 2025 | (United Kingdom) Kate Richardson | (Poland) Malwina Mul | (Belgium) Xaydée Van Sinaey |
| 2026 | (Switzerland) Ginia Caluori | (Belgium) Tess Moerman | (Slovakia) Sofia Ungerova |
