= Marijn de Vries =

Dutch cyclist

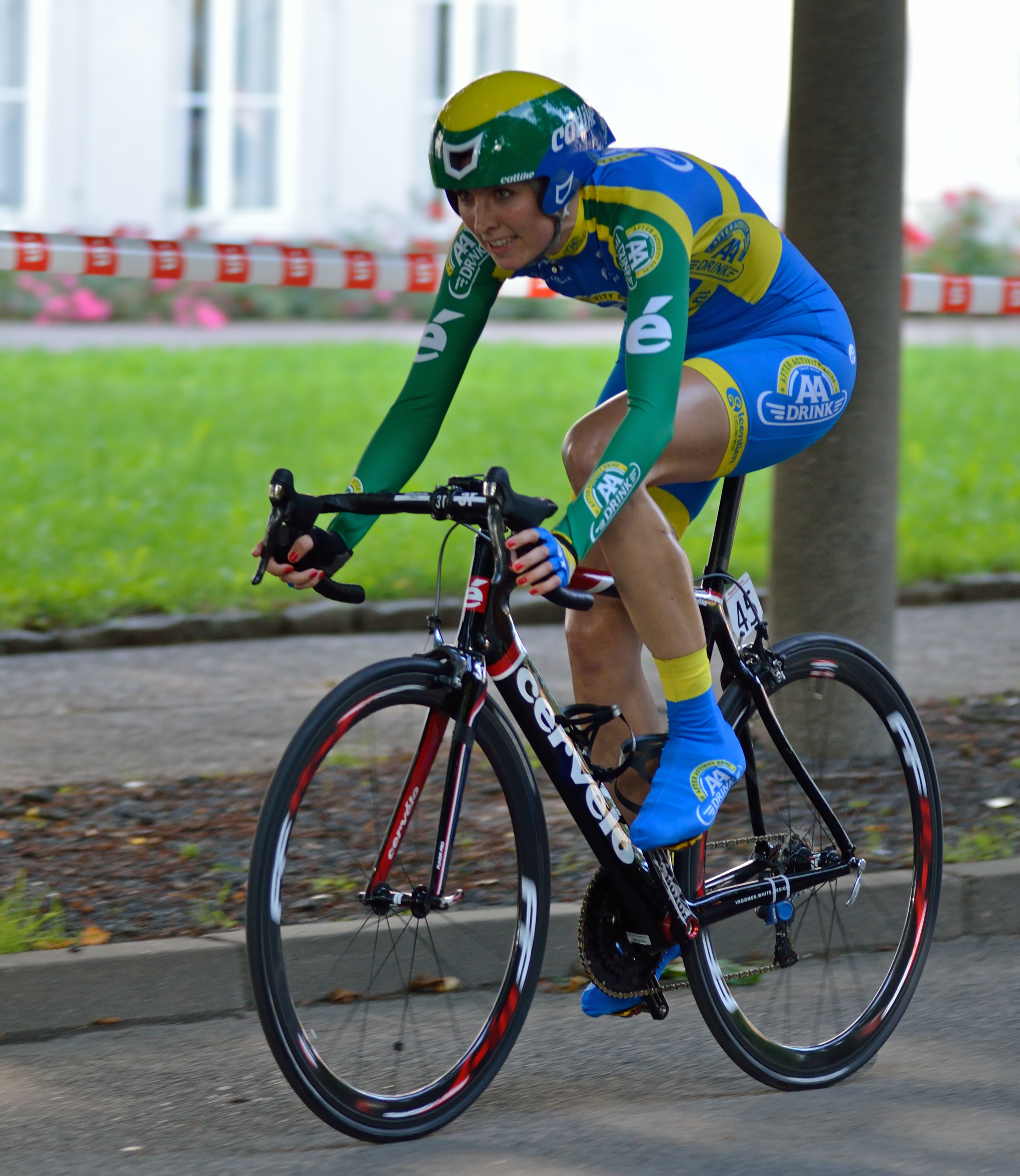
- De Vries in 2012

Personal information
- Full name: Marijn de Vries
- Born: 19 November 1978 (age 47) Sleen, Netherlands
- Height: 176 cm (5 ft 9 in)
- Weight: 62 kg (137 lb)

Cycling career
- Sport: Cycling
- Current team: Retired
- Discipline: Road
- Role: Rider
- Rider type: All-rounder

Professional teams
- 2010–2012: leontien.nl
- 2013: Lotto–Belisol Ladies
- 2014: Giant–Shimano
- 2015: Parkhotel Valkenburg

Marijn de Vries (born 19 November 1978) is a Dutch journalist and former racing cyclist. De Vries took up bicycle racing in 2008 whilst working as a reporter for the Dutch TV programme Holland Sport. She subsequently attempted to turn professional as part of a radio documentary she made, leading to her joining Leontien van Moorsel's Leontien.nl team in 2010. She competed in the 2013 UCI women's team time trial in Florence.

On 30 August 2015, de Vries announced her retirement from professional cycling.

== Major results ==
2010
9th Holland Hills Classic
2012
5th Chrono des Nations
7th Gooik–Geraardsbergen–Gooik
2013
8th Ronde van Drenthe World Cup

== See also ==
- 2011 AA Drink–leontien.nl season
- 2012 AA Drink–leontien.nl season
- 2014 Team Giant–Shimano season
