= Mascha Pijnenborg =

Dutch former cyclist

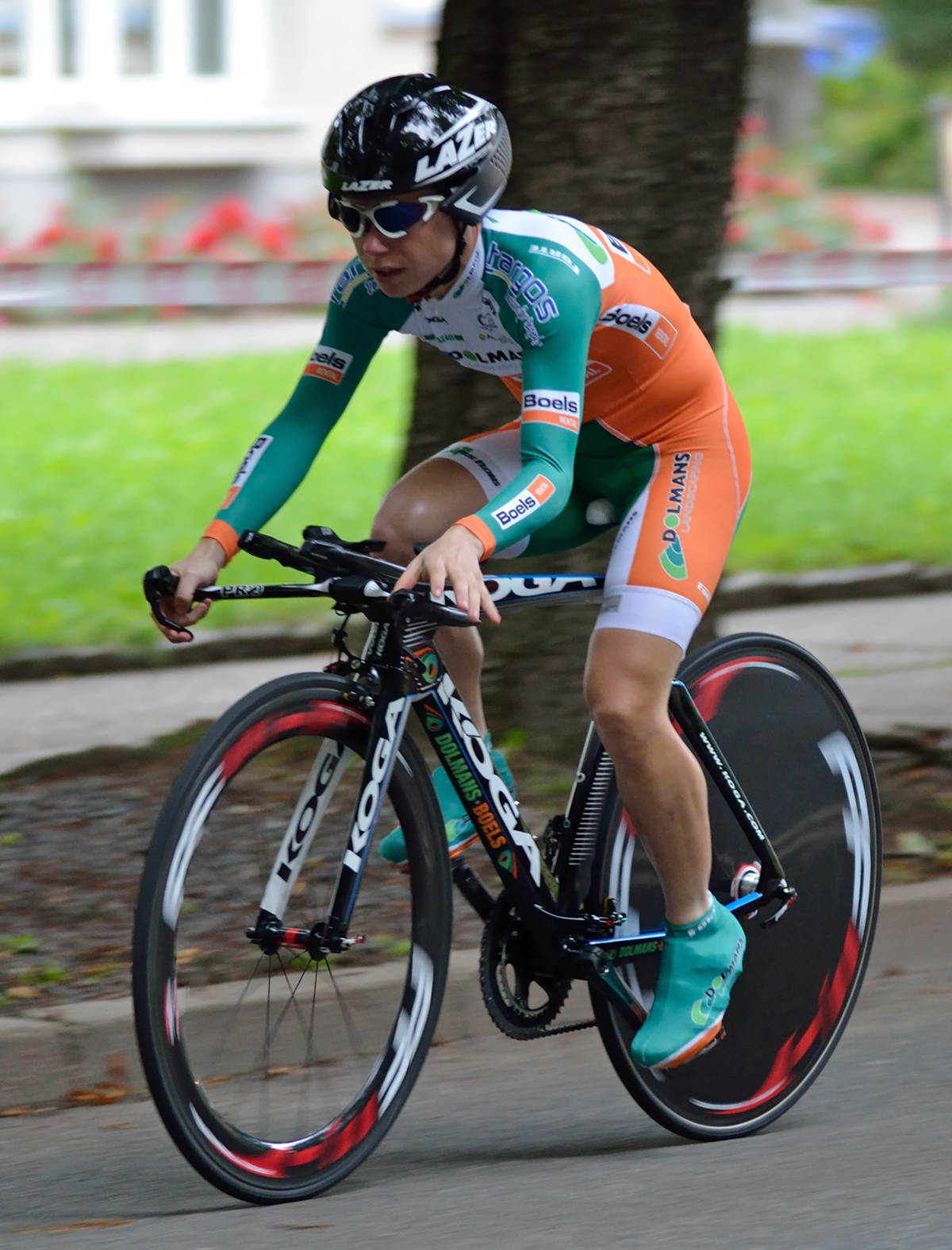

Personal information
- Born: 30 June 1981 (age 45) Waalwijk, Netherlands

Cycling career
- Sport: Cycling
- Discipline: Road
- Role: Rider

Amateur teams
- 2006: Team Brabant 2000
- 2007: TCW Het Snelle Wiel
- 2015: NWVG

Professional teams
- 2009–2010: Red Sun Cycling Team
- 2011–2012: Dolmans Landscaping Team
- 2013–2014: Team Futurumshop.nl–Polaris

Mascha Pijnenborg (born 30 June 1981) is a Dutch retired road racing cyclist.

== Career ==
Pijnenborg began racing at an amateur level in 2006. In 2008 she was a guest rider with Red Sun Cycling Team at the Tour Cycliste Féminin International de l'Ardèche. Following this she joined the team for 2 years.

She spent her 2 most successful seasons at Dolmans Landscaping Team, before joining Team Futurumshop.nl–Polaris for the final two years of her career.

== Outside of Cycling ==
Pijnenborg is also a counselor for people living with disabilities.

== Major results ==
2008
3rd Boezinge - Kampioenschap van Vlaanderen
2011
5th Overall Tour de Feminin-O cenu Českého Švýcarska

1st Stage 4

2012
7th Overall Tour de Free State
6th Road race, National Road Championships
6th Overall Tour de Feminin-O cenu Českého Švýcarska
9th Overall Internationale Thüringen Rundfahrt Der Frauen
2014
5th Overall Gracia–Orlová
