= Auensteiner–Radsporttage =

German road cycling race

Race details
- Date: June
- Region: Germany
- Discipline: Road
- Type: Stage race

History
- First edition: 2014
- Editions: 3
- Final edition: 2016
- First winner: Lisa Brennauer (GER)
- Most wins: Ashleigh Moolman (RSA) (2 wins)
- Final winner: Ashleigh Moolman (RSA)

Auensteiner–Radsporttage was a women's cycle race that took place in Germany. The race had three editions, and was rated by the Union Cycliste Internationale (UCI) as a 2.2 category race.

== Winners ==
Year	Country	Rider	Team
2014	Germany	Lisa Brennauer	Specialized–lululemon
2015	South Africa	Ashleigh Moolman	Bigla Pro Cycling Team
2016	South Africa	Ashleigh Moolman	Cervélo–Bigla Pro Cycling
