= Lensworld–Kuota =

Cycling team

Team information
- UCI code: TPO (2013); FTZ (2014); LWZ (2015–2016); LWK (2017)
- Registered: Netherlands (2013–2014); Belgium (2015–2017)
- Founded: 2013
- Disbanded: 2017
- Discipline: Road
- Status: UCI Women's Team
- Website: Team home page

Team name history
- 2013 2014 2015–2016 2017: Team Futurumshop.nl–Polaris; Futurumshop.nl–Zannata; Lensworld.eu–Zannata; Lensworld–Kuota
Lensworld–Kuota jersey
Jersey

Lensworld–Kuota (UCI code LWK) is a former professional cycling team based in Belgium, which competed in elite road bicycle racing events such as the UCI Women's Road World Cup.

In October 2017, the team announced they would fold before the start of the 2018 season. Lensworld had been recently taken over by peer – LensOnline – who decided not to renew the title sponsorship of the team.

== Team history ==
=== 2014 ===
For the 2015 season the team announced on their Facebook account that current minor sponsor, Lensworld.eu, would step up and become a named sponsor of the team, giving a new team name of Lensworld–Zannata.

==== Riders in ====
For the 2015 season the team announced that Mariël Borgerink, Kim de Baat, and Kaat Van der Meulen would be joining the team. Mieke Kröger, Evy Kuijpers, Annelies Dom, Annelies Van Doorslaer and Sofie De Vuyst also signed contract extensions. On November 9 the team signed Céline Van Severen and Marissa Otten Parkhotel Valkenberg.

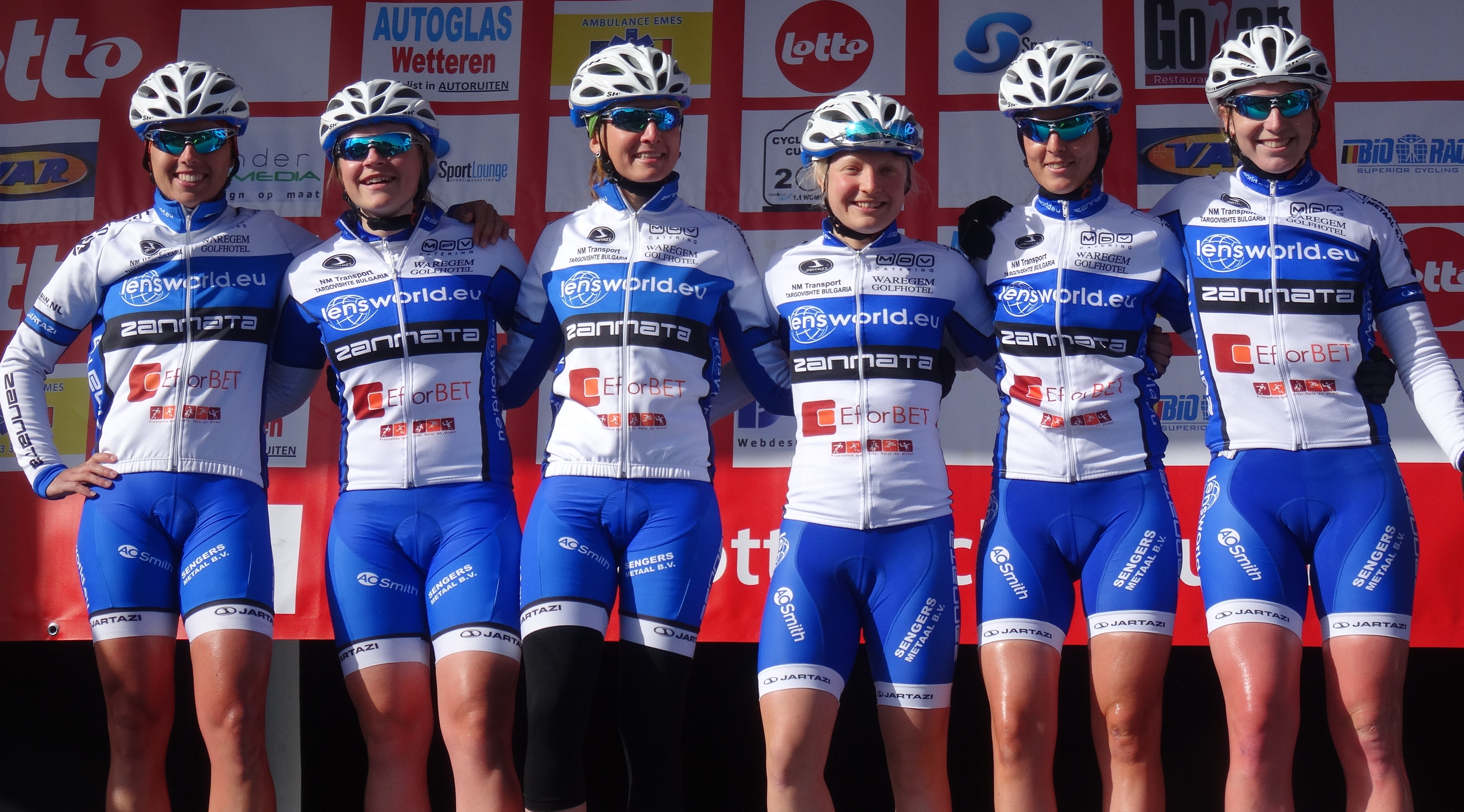
The team at the 2015 Le Samyn des Dames

== Team roster ==
Rider	Date of birth
Alice Maria Arzuffi (ITA)	19 November 1994 (age 31)
Maria Giulia Confalonieri (ITA)	30 March 1993 (age 33)
Annalisa Cucinotta (ITA)	3 April 1986 (age 40)
Kim De Baat (BEL)	29 May 1991 (age 35)
Tatiana Guderzo (ITA)	22 August 1984 (age 42)
Kaat Hannes (BEL)	21 November 1991 (age 34)

Rider	Date of birth
Maaike Polspoel (BEL)	28 March 1989 (age 37)
Tetyana Ryabchenko (UKR)	28 August 1989 (age 37)
Anouk Rijff (NED)	6 April 1996 (age 30)
Winanda Spoor (NED)	27 January 1991 (age 35)
Grace Verbeke (BEL)	12 November 1984 (age 41)
Nathalie Verschelden (BEL)	21 November 1991 (age 34)

== Major wins ==
2013
UCI Track World Cup, Aguascalientes (Team Pursuit), Stephanie Pohl & Mieke Kröger
UCI Track World Cup, Aguascalientes (Points race), Stephanie Pohl
2014
Provincial Time Trial Championships (Oost-Vlaanderen), Latoya Brulee
Provincial Road Race Championships (Vlaams-Brabant), Annelies Van Doorslaer
Herford Frühjahrsrennen, Janine Van der Meer
2015
Provincial Time Trial Championships (Vlaams-Brabant), Annelies Van Doorslaer
2016
Stage (ITT) Vuelta Internacional Femenina a Costa Rica, Flávia Oliveira
Belgium National Road Race championships, Kaat Hannes
Stage 2 BeNe Ladies Tour, Nina Kessler
Stage 2 (ITT) Tour de Pologne Féminin, Flávia Oliveira
Stage 4 Tour Cycliste Féminin International de l'Ardèche, Flávia Oliveira
2017
Sprints classification Holland Ladies Tour, Winanda Spoor

== National and continental champions ==
2013
Netherlands University Road Race, Anouska Koster
German Track (Omnium), Mieke Kröger
2014
European U23 Time Trial, Mieke Kröger
2015
Netherlands Track (Madison), Nina Kessler
2016
Italy U23 Cyclocross, Alice Maria Arzuffi
Italy Track (Points race), Maria Giulia Confalonieri
Belgium Road Race, Kaat Hannes
Netherlands Track (Omnium), Nina Kessler
Netherlands Track (Madison), Nina Kessler
2017
European Track Championships (Team pursuit), Tatiana Guderzo
