= 2016 BeNe Ladies Tour =

Race details
- Dates: 15–17 July 2016
- Stages: 4
- Winning time: 7h 32' 09"

Results
	Winner	Jolien D'Hoore (BEL)
	Second	Floortje Mackaij (NED)
	Third	Élise Delzenne (FRA)
	Points	Jolien D'Hoore (BEL)
	Youth	Floortje Mackaij (NED)

The 2016 BeNe Ladies Tour was the third edition of the BeNe Ladies Tour, a women's cycling stage race in the Netherlands and Belgium. It was rated by the UCI as a category 2.2 race and was held between 15 and 17 July 2016. The race was won by Jolien D'Hoore.

== Route ==
Stage characteristics and winners
Stage	Date	Course	Distance	Type	Stage winner
1	15 July	Philippine to Philippine	103 km (64 mi)	Flat stage	Jolien D'Hoore (BEL)
2a	16 July	Sint-Laureins to Sint-Laureins	75 km (47 mi)	Flat stage	Nina Kessler (NED)
2b	16 July	Sint-Laureins to Sint-Laureins	9.6 km (6.0 mi)	Individual time trial	Jolien D'Hoore (BEL)
3	17 July	Zelzate to Zelzate	112.2 km (69.7 mi)	Flat stage	Jolien D'Hoore (BEL)

== Stages ==
=== Stage 1 ===
15 July 2016 – Philippine to Philippine, 103 km (64.0 mi)

Stage 1 result

Rank	Rider	Team	Time
1	Jolien D'Hoore (BEL)	Wiggle High5	2h 35' 20"
2	Emilie Moberg (NOR)	Team Hitec Products	s.t.
3	Nina Kessler (NED)	Lensworld–Zannata	s.t.
4	Jip van den Bos (NED)	Parkhotel Valkenburg Continental Team	s.t.
5	Christina Siggaard (DEN)	Denmark	s.t.
6	Marta Tagliaferro (ITA)	Alé–Cipollini	s.t.
7	Monique van de Ree (NED)	Lares–Waowdeals	s.t.
8	Kelly Druyts (BEL)	Topsport Vlaanderen–Etixx–Guill D'or	s.t.
9	Chanella Stougje (NED)	Parkhotel Valkenburg Continental Team	s.t.
10	Ilona Hoeksma (NED)	Parkhotel Valkenburg Continental Team	s.t.

General classification after Stage 1

Rank	Rider	Team	Time
1	Jolien D'Hoore (BEL)	Wiggle High5	2h 35' 07"
2	Emilie Moberg (NOR)	Team Hitec Products	+ 7"
3	Nina Kessler (NED)	Lensworld–Zannata	s.t.
4	Marta Tagliaferro (ITA)	Alé–Cipollini	+ 10"
5	Chloe Hosking (AUS)	Wiggle High5	s.t.
6	Élise Delzenne (FRA)	Lotto–Soudal Ladies	+ 12"
7	Jip van den Bos (NED)	Parkhotel Valkenburg Continental Team	+ 13"
8	Christina Siggaard (DEN)	Denmark	s.t.
9	Monique van de Ree (NED)	Lares–Waowdeals	s.t.
10	Kelly Druyts (BEL)	Topsport Vlaanderen–Etixx–Guill D'or	s.t.

=== Stage 2a ===
16 July 2016 – Sint-Laureins to Sint-Laureins, 75 km (46.6 mi)

Stage 2a result

Rank	Rider	Team	Time
1	Nina Kessler (NED)	Lensworld–Zannata	1h 54' 30"
2	Floortje Mackaij (NED)	Team Liv–Plantur	s.t.
3	Chanella Stougje (NED)	Parkhotel Valkenburg Continental Team	s.t.
4	Monique van de Ree (NED)	Lares–Waowdeals	s.t.
5	Kelly Druyts (BEL)	Topsport Vlaanderen–Etixx–Guill D'or	s.t.
6	Marta Tagliaferro (ITA)	Alé–Cipollini	s.t.
7	Skylar Schneider (USA)	United States of America	s.t.
8	Evy Kuijpers (NED)		s.t.
9	Kelly Markus (NED)	Lares–Waowdeals	s.t.
10	Peta Mullens (AUS)		s.t.

General classification after Stage 2a

Rank	Rider	Team	Time
1	Jolien D'Hoore (BEL)	Wiggle High5	4h 29' 34"
2	Nina Kessler (NED)	Lensworld–Zannata	+ 2"
3	Emilie Moberg (NOR)	Team Hitec Products	+ 10"
4	Floortje Mackaij (NED)	Team Liv–Plantur	+ 12"
5	Marta Tagliaferro (ITA)	Alé–Cipollini	+ 13"
6	Chloe Hosking (AUS)	Wiggle High5	s.t.
7	Chanella Stougje (NED)	Parkhotel Valkenburg Continental Team	+ 14"
8	Élise Delzenne (FRA)	Lotto–Soudal Ladies	+ 15"
9	Christina Siggaard (DEN)	Denmark	s.t.
10	Monique van de Ree (NED)	Lares–Waowdeals	+ 16"

=== Stage 2b ===
16 July 2016 – Sint-Laureins to Sint-Laureins, (individual time trial) 9.6 km (6.0 mi)

Stage 2b result

Rank	Rider	Team	Time
1	Jolien D'Hoore (BEL)	Wiggle High5	12' 50"
2	Floortje Mackaij (NED)	Team Liv–Plantur	+ 14"
3	Élise Delzenne (FRA)	Lotto–Soudal Ladies	+ 18"
4	Maria Giulia Confalonieri (ITA)	Lensworld–Zannata	+ 24"
5	Emma White (USA)	United States of America	+ 28"
6	Riejanne Markus (NED)	Team Liv–Plantur	+ 33"
7	Cecilie Uttrup Ludwig (DEN)	Denmark	+ 39"
8	Trine Schmidt (DEN)	Denmark	+ 41"
9	Eileen Roe (GBR)	Lares–Waowdeals	+ 42"
10	Natalie van Gogh (NED)	Parkhotel Valkenburg Continental Team	+ 43"

General classification after Stage 2b

Rank	Rider	Team	Time
1	Jolien D'Hoore (BEL)	Wiggle High5	4h 42' 24"
2	Floortje Mackaij (NED)	Team Liv–Plantur	+ 26"
3	Élise Delzenne (FRA)	Lotto–Soudal Ladies	+ 33"
4	Maria Giulia Confalonieri (ITA)	Lensworld–Zannata	+ 40"
5	Riejanne Markus (NED)	Team Liv–Plantur	+ 49"
6	Cecilie Uttrup Ludwig (DEN)	Denmark	+ 55"
7	Nina Kessler (NED)	Lensworld–Zannata	+ 57"
8	Marta Tagliaferro (ITA)	Alé–Cipollini	+ 58"
9	Eileen Roe (GBR)	Lares–Waowdeals	s.t.
10	Natalie van Gogh (NED)	Parkhotel Valkenburg Continental Team	+ 59"

=== Stage 3 ===
17 July 2016 – Zelzate to Zelzate, 112 km (69.6 mi)

Stage 3 result

Rank	Rider	Team	Time
1	Jolien D'Hoore (BEL)	Wiggle High5	2h 49' 57"
2	Marta Tagliaferro (ITA)	Alé–Cipollini	s.t.
3	Élise Delzenne (FRA)	Lotto–Soudal Ladies	s.t.
4	Floortje Mackaij (NED)	Team Liv–Plantur	s.t.
5	Nina Kessler (NED)	Lensworld–Zannata	s.t.
6	Monique van de Ree (NED)	Lares–Waowdeals	s.t.
7	Evy Kuijpers (NED)		s.t.
8	Emilie Moberg (NOR)	Team Hitec Products	s.t.
9	Kelly Druyts (BEL)	Topsport Vlaanderen–Etixx–Guill D'or	s.t.
10	Marjolein van't Geloof (NED)		s.t.

General classification after Stage 3

Rank	Rider	Team	Time
1	Jolien D'Hoore (BEL)	Wiggle High5	7h 32' 09"
2	Floortje Mackaij (NED)	Team Liv–Plantur	+ 37"
3	Élise Delzenne (FRA)	Lotto–Soudal Ladies	+ 38"
4	Maria Giulia Confalonieri (ITA)	Lensworld–Zannata	+ 52"
5	Riejanne Markus (NED)	Team Liv–Plantur	+ 1' 01"
6	Marta Tagliaferro (ITA)	Alé–Cipollini	+ 1' 03"
7	Cecilie Uttrup Ludwig (DEN)	Denmark	+ 1' 07"
8	Nina Kessler (NED)	Lensworld–Zannata	+ 1' 09"
9	Eileen Roe (GBR)	Lares–Waowdeals	+ 1' 10"
10	Natalie van Gogh (NED)	Parkhotel Valkenburg Continental Team	+ 1' 11"

== Classification leadership ==
Stage	Winner	General classification	Points classification	Young rider classification
1	Jolien D'Hoore	Jolien D'Hoore	Jolien D'Hoore	Jip van den Bos
2a	Nina Kessler	Jolien D'Hoore	Nina Kessler	Floortje Mackaij
2b	Jolien D'Hoore	Jolien D'Hoore	Jolien D'Hoore	Floortje Mackaij
3	Jolien D'Hoore	Jolien D'Hoore	Jolien D'Hoore	Floortje Mackaij
Final Classification		Jolien D'Hoore	Jolien D'Hoore	Floortje Mackaij

== See also ==
- 2016 in women's road cycling
