= 2018 UCI Road World Championships – Women's team time trial =

Women's team time trial
2018 UCI Road World Championships
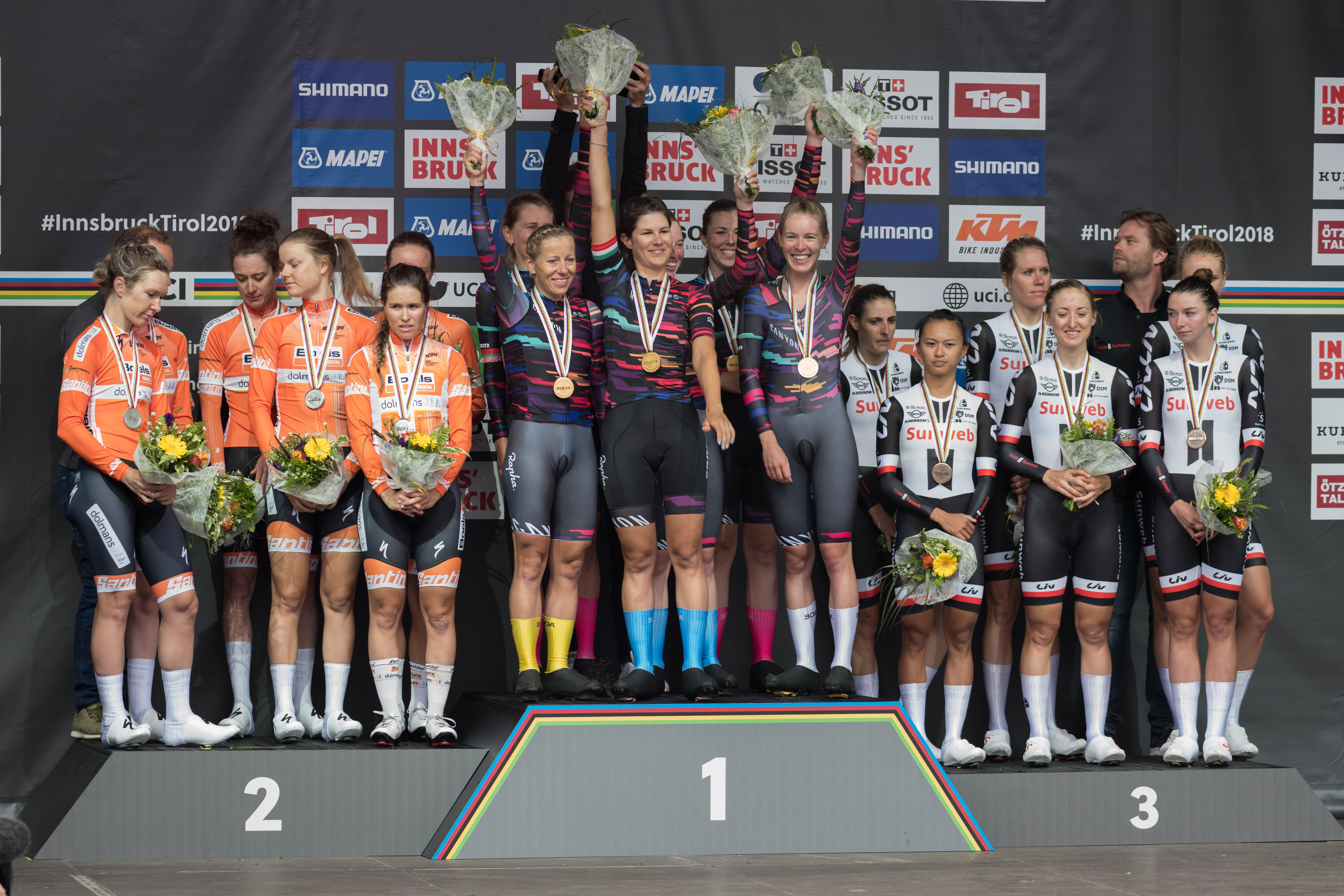

Race details
- Dates: 23 September 2018
- Stages: 1
- Distance: 54.1 km (33.6 mi)
- Winning time: 1h 01' 46.60"

Medalists
| | Gold | Canyon//SRAM |
| | Silver | Boels–Dolmans |
| | Bronze | Team Sunweb |

The Women's team time trial of the 2018 UCI Road World Championships was a cycling event that took place on 23 September 2018 in Innsbruck, Austria. It was the fifteenth edition of the championship, and the seventh since its reintroduction for trade teams in 2012. Dutch outfit Team Sunweb were the defending champions, having won in 2017. 12 teams and 72 riders entered the competition.

Canyon//SRAM from Germany won the world title for the first time, completing the race at an average speed of 52.544 kilometres per hour (32.649 mph), 21.9 seconds faster than Dutch team Boels–Dolmans. The bronze medal went to the defending world champions Team Sunweb, 28.67 seconds behind Canyon//SRAM.

Amongst the winning riders for Canyon//SRAM, Trixi Worrack won a record fifth team time trial world championships, having won four consecutive titles between 2012 and 2015 for Velocio–SRAM and its two previous iterations. Four of the five remaining riders won their first world title – Alena Amialiusik won her second gold medal – in a result described as a "surprise" by the cycling media, as it was the squad's first team time trial win of 2018.

== Course ==
The race consisted of a route 52.1 kilometres (32.4 miles) in length, starting from Ötztal and ending in Innsbruck. The route was primarily rolling, but also did not include the climb of 4.5 kilometres (2.8 miles) between Kematen in Tirol and Axams, that was part of the men's event later that day.

== Final classification ==
All twelve teams completed the 52.1-kilometre (32.4 mi)-long course.

| Rank | Team | Riders | Time |
|---|---|---|---|
| 1 | (Germany) Canyon//SRAM | Alena Amialiusik (BLR); Alice Barnes (GBR); Hannah Barnes (GBR); Elena Cecchini (ITA); Lisa Klein (GER); Trixi Worrack (GER) | 1h 01' 46.60" |
| 2 | (Netherlands) Boels–Dolmans | Chantal Blaak (NED); Karol-Ann Canuel (CAN); Amalie Dideriksen (DEN); Christine Majerus (LUX); Amy Pieters (NED); Anna van der Breggen (NED) | + 21.90" |
| 3 | (Netherlands) Team Sunweb | Lucinda Brand (NED); Leah Kirchmann (CAN); Liane Lippert (GER); Pernille Mathiesen (DEN); Coryn Rivera (USA); Ellen van Dijk (NED) | + 28.67" |
| 4 | (United Kingdom) Wiggle High5 | Katie Archibald (GBR); Lisa Brennauer (GER); Audrey Cordon (FRA); Annette Edmondson (AUS); Emilia Fahlin (SWE); Kirsten Wild (NED) | + 57.38" |
| 5 | (Australia) Mitchelton–Scott | Jessica Allen (AUS); Jolien D'Hoore (BEL); Gracie Elvin (AUS); Lucy Kennedy (AUS); Sarah Roy (AUS); Georgia Williams (NZL) | + 1' 29.77" |
| 6 | (Denmark) Team Virtu Cycling | Barbara Guarischi (ITA); Mieke Kröger (GER); Louise Norman Hansen (DEN); Sara Penton (SWE); Trine Schmidt (DEN); Doris Schweizer (SUI) | + 2' 06.23" |
| 7 | (Slovenia) BTC City Ljubljana | Polona Batagelj (SLO); Maaike Boogaard (NED); Eugenia Bujak (SLO); Anastasiia Iakovenko (RUS); Corinna Lechner (GER); Hanna Nilsson (SWE) | + 3' 08.44" |
| 8 | (Italy) Valcar–PBM | Elisa Balsamo (ITA); Marta Cavalli (ITA); Maria Giulia Confalonieri (ITA); Chiara Consonni (ITA); Ilaria Sanguineti (ITA); Alessia Vigilia (ITA) | + 3' 35.36" |
| 9 | (Italy) Bepink | Tatiana Guderzo (ITA); Tereza Medveďová (SVK); Lisa Morzenti (ITA); Francesca Pattaro (ITA); Nicole Steigenga (NED); Silvia Valsecchi (ITA) | + 3' 36.10" |
| 10 | (Italy) Alé–Cipollini | Chloe Hosking (AUS); Roxane Knetemann (NED); Soraya Paladin (ITA); Daiva Ragažinskienė (LTU); Karlijn Swinkels (NED); Anna Trevisi (ITA) | + 3' 53.54" |
| 11 | (Russia) Cogeas–Mettler Pro Cycling Team | Evgeniya Augustinas (RUS); Gulnaz Badykova (RUS); Antri Christoforou (CYP); Elizaveta Oshurkova (RUS); Edwige Pitel (FRA); Olga Zabelinskaya (UZB) | + 3' 56.69" |
| 12 | (Netherlands) Parkhotel Valkenburg | Nina Buysman (NED); Ilona Hoeksma (NED); Marit Raaijmakers (NED); Natalie van Gogh (NED); Esther van Veen (NED); Lorena Wiebes (NED) | + 4' 10.83" |
