= 2015 Parkhotel Valkenburg Continental Team season =

2015 Parkhotel Valkenburg Continental Team

Season victories
- One-day races: 1
- Stage race overall: 0
- Stage race stages: 2

The 2015 women's road cycling season was the second for the Parkhotel Valkenburg Continental Team as a UCI women's team and the third year for the team which began as Parkhotel Valkenburg p/b Math Salden in 2013.

== Roster ==
As of 1 January 2015. Ages as of 1 January 2015.

Rider	Date of birth
Sophie de Boer (NED)	December 12, 1990 (aged 24)
Janneke Ensing (NED)	September 21, 1986 (aged 28)
Ilona Hoeksma (NED)	May 22, 1991 (aged 23)
Riejanne Markus (NED)	September 1, 1994 (aged 20)
Jermaine Post (NED)	June 10, 1992 (aged 22)
Pauliena Rooijakkers (NED)	May 12, 1993 (aged 21)

Rider	Date of birth
Rozanne Slik (NED)	April 12, 1991 (aged 23)
Chanella Stougje (NED)	October 23, 1996 (aged 18)
Jip van den Bos (NED)	April 12, 1996 (aged 18)
Bianca van den Hoek (NED)	July 28, 1976 (aged 38)
Natalie van Gogh (NED)	September 14, 1974 (aged 40)
Marijn de Vries (NED)	19 November 1978 (aged 36)

Riders who joined the team for the 2015 season

Rider	2014 team
Janneke Ensing (NED)	Boels–Dolmans
Chanella Stougje (NED)	-
Jip van den Bos (NED)	-
Marijn de Vries (NED)	Giant–Shimano

Riders who left the team during or after the 2014 season

Rider	2015 team
Kim de Baat (NED)	Lensworld.eu–Zannata
Aafke Eshuis (NED)	Retired
Marissa Otten (NED)	Lensworld.eu–Zannata
Kirsten Peetoom (NED)	
Monique van de Ree (NED)	
Lisanne Soemanta (NED)	
Esra Tromp (NED)	Retired

== Season victories ==
Single day and stage races 2015
Date	Race	Cat.	Rider	Country	Location
16 May	Trofee Maarten Wynants	1.2	Natalie van Gogh (NED)	Belgium	Houthalen-Helchteren
6 June	Auensteiner–Radsporttage, Stage 2	2.2	Rozanne Slik (NED)	Germany	Auenstein
8 September	Belgium Tour, Stage 1	2.2	Natalie van Gogh (NED)	Belgium	Quevaucamps

== UCI World Ranking ==
The 2015 UCI Women's Road Rankings are rankings based upon the results in all UCI-sanctioned races of the 2015 women's road cycling season.

Parkhotel Valkenburg finished 20th in the 2015 ranking for UCI teams.

Individual world ranking
Rank	Rider	Points
61	(Netherlands) Natalie van Gogh	137
71	(Netherlands) Janneke Ensing	113
173	(Netherlands) Jermaine Post	32
184	(Netherlands) Chanella Stougje	27
192	(Netherlands) Riejanne Markus	25
216	(Netherlands) Jip van den Bos	21
251	(Netherlands) Rozanne Slik	15
274	(Netherlands) Ilona Hoeksma	13
