= 2015 Ronde van Overijssel =

Race details
- Dates: 1 May 2015
- Distance: 143.1 km (88.9 mi)
- Winning time: 3h 39' 45"

Results
	Winner	Lauren Kitchen (AUS)	(Team Hitec Products)
	Second	Natalie van Gogh (NED)	(Parkhotel Valkenburg Continental Team)
	Third	Anouska Koster (NED)	(Rabobank-Liv Woman Cycling Team)

The 2015 Ronde van Overijssel was a one-day women's cycle race held in the Netherlands on 1 May 2015. It was the second edition of the Ronde van Overijssel, and had a UCI rating of 1.1.

== Results ==
Result
Rank	Rider	Team	Time
1	Lauren Kitchen (AUS)	Team Hitec Products	3h 39' 45"
2	Natalie van Gogh (NED)	Parkhotel Valkenburg Continental Team	+ 0"
3	Anouska Koster (NED)	Rabobank-Liv Woman Cycling Team	+ 0"
4	Ellen van Dijk (NED)	Boels–Dolmans	+ 0"
5	Monique van de Ree (NED)	De Jonge Renner Ladies	+ 0"
6	Roxane Knetemann (NED)	Rabobank-Liv Woman Cycling Team	+ 6"
7	Kirsten Wild (NED)	Team Hitec Products	+ 10"
8	Anna Knauer (GER)	Rabobank-Liv Woman Cycling Team	+ 10"
9	Chantal Blaak (NED)	Boels–Dolmans	+ 10"
10	Ilona Hoeksma (NED)	Parkhotel Valkenburg Continental Team	+ 10"

== See also ==
- 2015 in women's road cycling
