= 2016 Tour of Chongming Island =

2016 UCI Women's World Tour, race 7 of 17

Race details
- Dates: 6 – 8 May 2016
- Stages: 3
- Distance: 351.6 km (218.5 mi)
- Winning time: 8h 30' 56"

Results
Jersey awarded to the overall winner	Winner	Chloe Hosking (AUS)	(Wiggle High5)
	Second	Huang Ting-ying (TAI)	(Taiwan (national team))
	Third	Leah Kirchmann (CAN)	(Team Liv–Plantur)
	Points	Chloe Hosking (AUS)	(Wiggle High5)
	Mountains	Chloe Hosking (AUS)	(Wiggle High5)
	Young rider	Jip van den Bos (NED)	(Parkhotel Valkenburg Continental Team)
	Team	Parkhotel Valkenburg Continental Team	

The 2016 Tour of Chongming Island was the tenth staging of Tour of Chongming Island, a women's stage race held in Shanghai, China. It ran from 6 to 8 May 2016 and was part of the UCI Women's World Tour.

== Schedule ==
List of stages
Stage	Date	Course	Distance	Type	Winner
1	6 May	Xincheng Park – Xincheng Park	139.8 km (86.9 mi)	Flat stage	Huang Ting-ying (TAI)
2	7 May	Xincheng Park – Xincheng Park	112.8 km (70.1 mi)	Flat stage	Chloe Hosking (AUS)
3	8 May	Xincheng Park – Xincheng Park	99.0 km (61.5 mi)	Flat stage	Huang Ting-ying (TAI)
Total			351.6 km (218.5 mi)		

== Results ==
=== Stage 1 ===
6 May 2016 – Xincheng Park – Xincheng Park, 139.8 km (86.9 mi)

Stage 1 Result

Rank	Rider	Team	Time
1	Huang Ting-ying (TAI)	Taiwan (national team)	3h 21' 25"
2	Leah Kirchmann (CAN)	Team Liv–Plantur	s.t.
3	Chloe Hosking (AUS)	Wiggle High5	s.t.
4	Maria Vittoria Sperotto (ITA)	Servetto Footon	s.t.
5	Pascale Jeuland (FRA)	Poitou-Charentes.Futuroscope.86	s.t.
6	Roxane Fournier (FRA)	Poitou-Charentes.Futuroscope.86	s.t.
7	Anna Trevisi (ITA)	Alé–Cipollini	s.t.
8	Annalisa Cucinotta (ITA)	Alé–Cipollini	s.t.
9	Jutatip Maneephan (THA)	Thailand (national team)	s.t.
10	Jip van den Bos (NED)	Parkhotel Valkenburg Continental Team	s.t.

General Classification after Stage 1

Rank	Rider	Team	Time
1	Huang Ting-ying (TAI)	Taiwan (national team)	3h 21' 25"
2	Leah Kirchmann (CAN)	Team Liv–Plantur	+ 2"
3	Annalisa Cucinotta (ITA)	Alé–Cipollini	+ 4"
4	Chloe Hosking (AUS)	Wiggle High5	+ 6"
5	Emilie Moberg (NOR)	Team Hitec Products	+ 7"
6	Lucy Garner (GBR)	Wiggle High5	+ 9"
7	Maria Vittoria Sperotto (ITA)	Servetto Footon	+ 10"
8	Pascale Jeuland (FRA)	Poitou-Charentes.Futuroscope.86	+ 10"
9	Roxane Fournier (FRA)	Poitou-Charentes.Futuroscope.86	+ 10"
10	Anna Trevisi (ITA)	Alé–Cipollini	+ 10"

=== Stage 2 ===
7 May 2016 – Xincheng Park – Xincheng Park, 112.8 km (70.1 mi)

Stage 2 Result

Rank	Rider	Team	Time
1	Chloe Hosking (AUS)	Wiggle High5	2h 43' 46"
2	Leah Kirchmann (CAN)	Team Liv–Plantur	s.t.
3	Jip van den Bos (NED)	Parkhotel Valkenburg Continental Team	s.t.
4	Emilie Moberg (NOR)	Team Hitec Products	s.t.
5	Annalisa Cucinotta (ITA)	Alé–Cipollini	s.t.
6	Sheyla Gutiérrez (ESP)	Cylance Pro Cycling	s.t.
7	Mia Radotic (CRO)	BTC City Ljubljana	s.t.
8	Gu Sun-geun (KOR)	Korea (national team)	s.t.
9	Roxane Fournier (FRA)	Poitou-Charentes.Futuroscope.86	s.t.
10	Arianna Fidanza (ITA)	Astana	s.t.

General Classification after Stage 2

Rank	Rider	Team	Time
1	Chloe Hosking (AUS)	Wiggle High5	6h 04' 52"
2	Leah Kirchmann (CAN)	Team Liv–Plantur	+ 4"
3	Huang Ting-ying (TAI)	Taiwan (national team)	+ 9"
4	Annalisa Cucinotta (ITA)	Alé–Cipollini	+ 11"
5	Jip van den Bos (NED)	Parkhotel Valkenburg Continental Team	+ 15"
6	Roxane Fournier (FRA)	Poitou-Charentes.Futuroscope.86	+ 16"
7	Emilie Moberg (NOR)	Team Hitec Products	+ 16"
8	Mia Radotic (CRO)	BTC City Ljubljana	+ 18"
9	Lucy Garner (GBR)	Wiggle High5	+ 18"
10	Sheyla Gutiérrez (ESP)	Cylance Pro Cycling	+ 19"

=== Stage 3 ===
8 May 2016 – Xincheng Park – Xincheng Park, 99.0 km (61.5 mi)

Stage 3 Result

Rank	Rider	Team	Time
1	Huang Ting-ying (TAI)	Taiwan (national team)	2h 26' 06"
2	Roxane Fournier (FRA)	Poitou-Charentes.Futuroscope.86	s.t.
3	Ilona Hoeksma (NED)	Parkhotel Valkenburg Continental Team	s.t.
4	Jermaine Post (NED)	Parkhotel Valkenburg Continental Team	s.t.
5	Sheyla Gutiérrez (ESP)	Cylance Pro Cycling	s.t.
6	Jip van den Bos (NED)	Parkhotel Valkenburg Continental Team	s.t.
7	Pascale Jeuland (FRA)	Poitou-Charentes.Futuroscope.86	s.t.
8	Arianna Fidanza (ITA)	Astana	s.t.
9	Sara Mustonen (SWE)	Team Liv–Plantur	s.t.
10	Leah Kirchmann (CAN)	Team Liv–Plantur	s.t.

General Classification after Stage 3

Rank	Rider	Team	Time
1	Chloe Hosking (AUS)	Wiggle High5	8h 30' 56"
2	Huang Ting-ying (TAI)	Taiwan (national team)	+ 1"
3	Leah Kirchmann (CAN)	Team Liv–Plantur	+ 5"
4	Annalisa Cucinotta (ITA)	Alé–Cipollini	+ 11"
5	Roxane Fournier (FRA)	Poitou-Charentes.Futuroscope.86	+ 12"
6	Jip van den Bos (NED)	Parkhotel Valkenburg Continental Team	+ 17"
7	Ilona Hoeksma (NED)	Parkhotel Valkenburg Continental Team	+ 17"
8	Emilie Moberg (NOR)	Team Hitec Products	+ 18"
9	Olena Pavlukhina (AZE)	BTC City Ljubljana	+ 18"
10	Eugenia Bujak (POL)	BTC City Ljubljana	+ 18"
