= 2015 Marianne Vos Classic =

2015 Rabobank Marianne Vos Classic
Race details
- Dates: 9 May 2015
- Distance: 121.2 km (75.3 mi)
- Winning time: 2h 58' 33"

Results
	Winner	Chloe Hosking (AUS)	(Wiggle–Honda)
	Second	Marianne Vos (NED)	(Rabobank-Liv Woman Cycling Team)
	Third	Amy Pieters (NED)	(Team Liv–Plantur)

The 2015 Rabobank Marianne Vos Classic, also known as the Rabobank 7-Dorpenomloop Aalburg, was held on 9 May 2015, in Aalburg, Netherlands. A 121.2-kilometre (75.3-mile) women's road cycling race, it was won by Chloe Hosking (Wiggle–Honda), who beat Marianne Vos (Rabobank-Liv Woman Cycling Team) and Amy Pieters (Team Liv–Plantur).

== Results ==
Result
Rank	Rider	Team	Time
1	Chloe Hosking (AUS)	Wiggle–Honda	2h 58' 33"
2	Marianne Vos (NED)	Rabobank-Liv Woman Cycling Team	+ 0"
3	Amy Pieters (NED)	Team Liv–Plantur	+ 0"
4	Emma Johansson (SWE)	Orica–AIS	+ 0"
5	Elisa Longo Borghini (ITA)	Wiggle–Honda	+ 3"
6	Janneke Ensing (NED)	Parkhotel Valkenburg Continental Team	+ 3"
7	Natalie van Gogh (NED)	Parkhotel Valkenburg Continental Team	+ 3"
8	Roxane Knetemann (NED)	Rabobank-Liv Woman Cycling Team	+ 10"
9	Moniek Tenniglo (NED)	Rabobank-Liv Woman Cycling Team	+ 10"
10	Eileen Roe (GBR)	Wiggle–Honda	+ 18"
