= 2015 Ronde van Gelderland =

Race details
- Dates: 19 April 2015
- Distance: 126.7 km (78.7 mi)
- Winning time: 3h 22' 23"

Results
	Winner	Kirsten Wild (NED)	(Team Hitec Products)
	Second	Lucy Garner (GBR)	(Team Liv–Plantur)
	Third	Barbara Guarischi (ITA)	(Velocio–SRAM)

The 2015 Ronde van Gelderland was a one-day women's cycle race held in the Netherlands on 19 April 2015. The race was given a UCI rating of 1.2. Kirsten Wild won for the third year in a row, for her fourth win in the race.

== Results ==
Rank	Rider	Team	Time
1	Kirsten Wild (NED)	Team Hitec Products	3h 22' 23"
2	Lucy Garner (GBR)	Team Liv–Plantur	+ 0"
3	Barbara Guarischi (ITA)	Velocio–SRAM	+ 0"
4	Jolien D'Hoore (BEL)	Wiggle–Honda	+ 0"
5	Katarzyna Pawłowska (POL)	Boels–Dolmans	+ 0"
6	Marianne Vos (NED)	Rabobank-Liv Woman Cycling Team	+ 0"
7	Jip van den Bos (NED)	Parkhotel Valkenburg Continental Team	+ 0"
8	Kim de Baat (BEL)	Lensworld.eu–Zannata	+ 0"
9	Eugenia Bujak (POL)	BTC City Ljubljana	+ 0"
10	Nike Beckeringh (NED)	GRC Jan van Arckel	+ 0"

== See also ==
- 2015 in women's road cycling
