= Aafke Soet =

Dutch cyclist (born 1997)

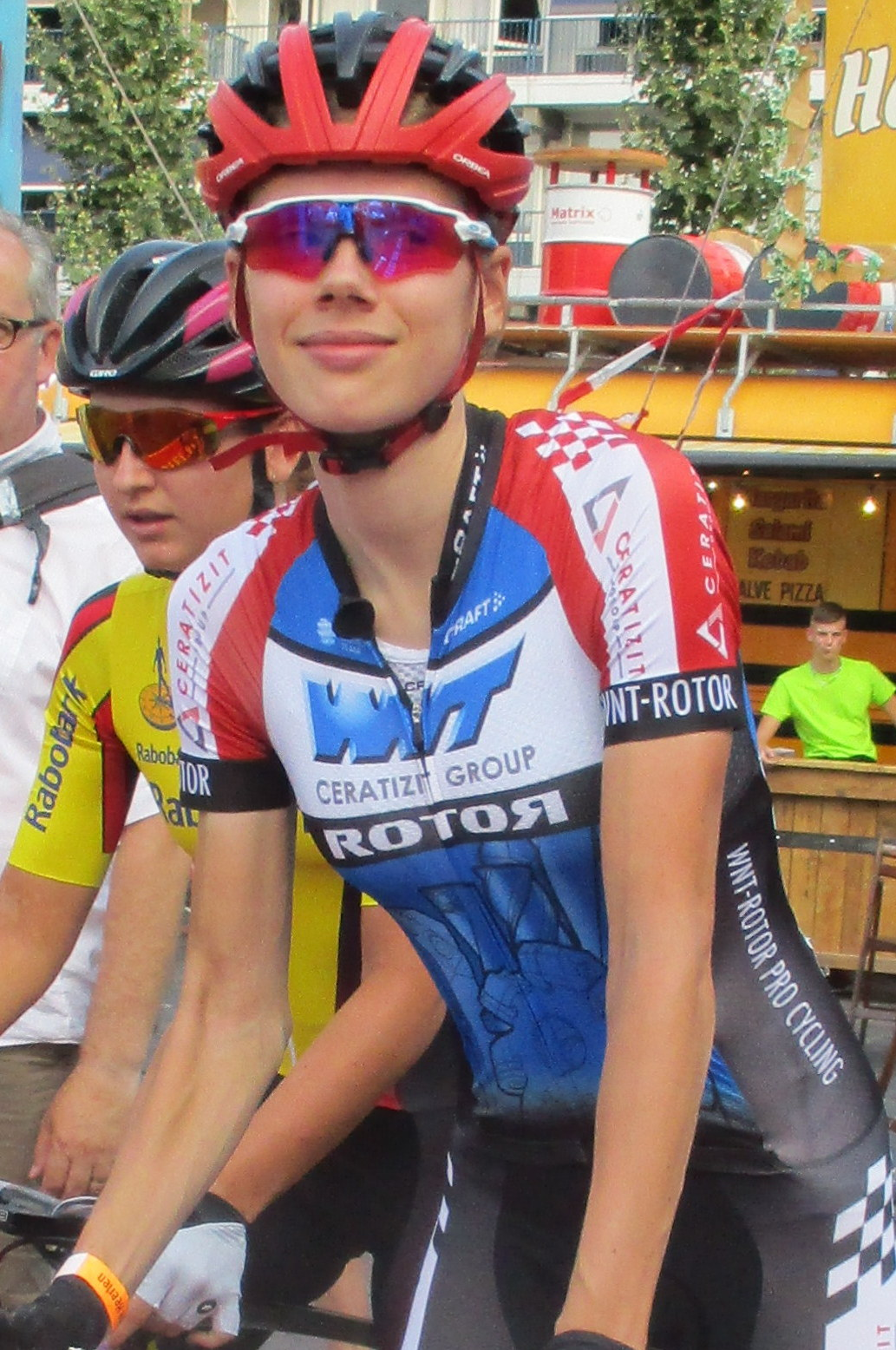
- Soet in 2018

Personal information
- Full name: Aafke Soet
- Nickname: Aaf
- Born: 23 November 1997 (age 28) Heerenveen, Netherlands

Cycling career
- Sport: Cycling
- Discipline: Road
- Role: Retired
- Rider type: Climber; Time trialist

Professional teams
- 2017: Parkhotel Valkenburg–Destil
- 2018–2020: WNT–Rotor Pro Cycling
- 2021–2022: Team Jumbo–Visma

Aafke Soet (born 23 November 1997) is a Dutch former professional racing cyclist, who last rode for UCI Women's Continental Team Team Jumbo–Visma in 2021 and 2022. Before cycling, she was a speed skater who had represented the Netherlands at the 2012 Winter Youth Olympics. In 2018, she won stage 5 of the Healthy Ageing Tour. She retired from professional cycle racing at the end of 2022.

== Major results ==
2014
1st Time trial, UEC European Junior Road Championships
1st Time trial, National Junior Road Championships
2015
2nd Time trial, National Junior Road Championships
2017
7th Chrono des Nations
2018
UEC European Under-23 Road Championships

1st Time trial
2nd Road race

1st Time trial, Omloop van Borsele
1st Stage 5 Healthy Ageing Tour
1st Young rider classification Emakumeen Euskal Bira
