= Ilona Hoeksma =

Dutch cyclist (born 1991)

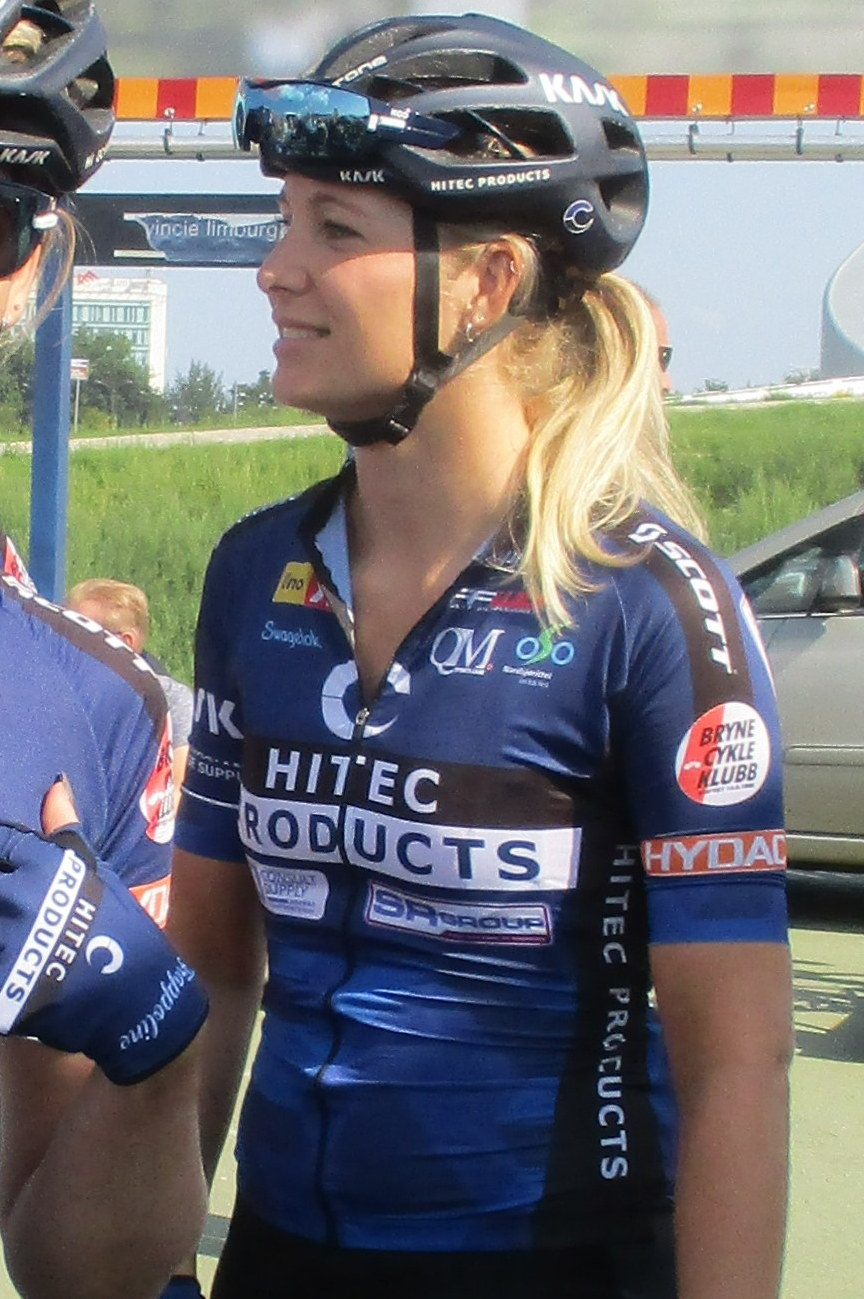
- Hoeksma at the 2017 Holland Ladies Tour

Personal information
- Full name: Ilona Hoeksma
- Born: 22 May 1991 (age 35) Luxwoude, Netherlands

Cycling career
- Sport: Cycling
- Current team: Retired
- Discipline: Road
- Role: Rider

Professional teams
- 2014–2016: Parkhotel Valkenburg Continental Team
- 2017: Team Hitec Products
- 2018: Parkhotel Valkenburg

Ilona Hoeksma (born 22 May 1991) is a Dutch former professional racing cyclist, who last rode for UCI Women's Team Parkhotel Valkenburg.

== Major results ==
2013
10th EPZ Omloop van Borsele
2015
5th Parel van de Veluwe
10th Ronde van Overijssel
2016
7th Overall Tour of Chongming Island
2017
4th Diamond Tour
2018
9th Omloop van de IJsseldelta

== See also ==
- 2014 Parkhotel Valkenburg Continental Team season
- 2015 Parkhotel Valkenburg Continental Team season
