= 2015 Belgium Tour =

2015 Lotto-Belisol Belgium Tour
Race details
- Dates: 8–11 September 2015
- Stages: 4
- Distance: 402.3 km (250.0 mi)

The 2015 Lotto-Belisol Belgium Tour is the third edition of the Lotto-Belisol Belgium Tour, previous called Lotto-Decca Tour, a women's cycle stage race in Belgium. The tour has an UCI rating of 2.2.

== Stages ==
=== Stage 1 ===
8 September – Quevaucamps to Quevaucamps, 89.4 km (55.6 mi)

Stage 1 result

	Rider	Team	Time
1	Natalie van Gogh (NED)	Parkhotel Valkenburg Continental Team	2h 11' 40"
2	Anna Plichta (POL)	n/d	+ 2"
3	Cecilie Gotaas Johnsen (NOR)	Team Hitec Products	+ 2"
4	Lauren Kitchen (AUS)	Team Hitec Products	+ 10"
5	Amy Pieters (NED)	Team Liv–Plantur	+ 10"
6	Elena Cecchini (ITA)	Lotto–Soudal Ladies	+ 10"
7	Jip van den Bos (NED)	Parkhotel Valkenburg Continental Team	+ 10"
8	Amalie Dideriksen (DEN)	Boels–Dolmans	+ 10"
9	Kelly Druyts (BEL)	Topsport Vlaanderen-Pro-Duo	+ 10"
10	Emma Johansson (SWE)	Orica–AIS	+ 10"

General classification after stage 1

	Rider	Team	Time
1	Natalie van Gogh (NED)	Parkhotel Valkenburg Continental Team	2h 11' 30"
2	Anna Plichta (POL)	n/d	+ 6"
3	Cecilie Gotaas Johnsen (NOR)	Team Hitec Products	+ 8"
4	Hanka Kupfernagel (GER)	n/d	+ 8"
5	Lauren Kitchen (AUS)	Team Hitec Products	+ 11"
6	Elena Cecchini (ITA)	Lotto–Soudal Ladies	+ 16"
7	Emma Johansson (SWE)	Orica–AIS	+ 17"
8	Floortje Mackaij (NED)	Team Liv–Plantur	+ 18"
9	Amy Pieters (NED)	Team Liv–Plantur	+ 20"
10	Jip van den Bos (NED)	Parkhotel Valkenburg Continental Team	+ 20"

=== Stage 2 ===
9 September – Moorslede to Moorslede, 115.7 km (71.9 mi)

Stage 3 result
Rank	Rider	Team	Time
1	Amalie Dideriksen (DEN)	Boels–Dolmans	2h 53' 38"
2	Amy Pieters (NED)	Team Liv–Plantur	s.t.
3	Emma Johansson (SWE)	Orica–GreenEDGE	s.t.
4	Katarzyna Niewiadoma (POL)	Rabobank-Liv Woman Cycling Team	s.t.
5	Kelly Druyts (BEL)	Topsport Vlaanderen–Pro-Duo	s.t.
6	Sofie De Vuyst (BEL)	Lensworld.eu–Zannata	s.t.
7	Elena Cecchini (ITA)	Lotto–Soudal Ladies	s.t.
8	Céline Van Severen (BEL)	Lensworld.eu–Zannata	s.t.
9	Anna van der Breggen (NED)	Rabobank-Liv Woman Cycling Team	s.t.
10	Tatiana Guderzo (ITA)	Team Hitec Products	s.t.

General classification after Stage 3
Rank	Rider	Team	Time
1	Anna Plichta (POL)		5h 05' 14"
2	Emma Johansson (SWE)	Orica–GreenEDGE	+ 1"
3	Amalie Dideriksen (DEN)	Boels–Dolmans	+ 3"
4	Amy Pieters (NED)	Team Liv–Plantur	+ 5"
5	Elena Cecchini (ITA)	Lotto–Soudal Ladies	+ 6"
6	Kelly Druyts (BEL)	Topsport Vlaanderen–Pro-Duo	+ 11"
7	Tatiana Guderzo (ITA)	Team Hitec Products	+ 13"
8	Katarzyna Niewiadoma (POL)	Rabobank-Liv Woman Cycling Team	+ 14"
9	Céline Van Severen (BEL)	Lensworld.eu–Zannata	+ 14"
10	Jeanne Korevaar (NED)		+ 14"

=== Stage 3 ===
10 September – Haaltert to Haaltert, 83.7 km (52.0 mi)

Floortje Mackaij (Liv-Plantur) won the third stage in and around Haaltert. She escapes from a front group of nine riders and rode solo to the finish. Emma Johansson from Sweden won behind Mackaij the sprint of the group ahead of the Danish Amalie Dideriksen and is the new leader in the general classification.

Stage 3 result
Rank	Rider	Team	Time
1	Floortje Mackaij (NED)	Team Liv–Plantur	2h 10' 11"
2	Emma Johansson (SWE)	Orica–GreenEDGE	+ 22"
3	Amalie Dideriksen (DEN)	Boels–Dolmans	+ 22"
4	Elena Cecchini (ITA)	Lotto–Soudal Ladies	+ 22"
5	Katarzyna Niewiadoma (POL)	Rabobank-Liv Woman Cycling Team	+ 22"
6	Anna van der Breggen (NED)	Rabobank-Liv Woman Cycling Team	+ 22"
7	Amy Pieters (NED)	Team Liv–Plantur	+ 22"
8	Tatiana Guderzo (ITA)	Team Hitec Products	+ 22"
9	Sofie De Vuyst (BEL)	Lensworld.eu–Zannata	+ 22"
10	Sara Mustonen (SWE)	Team Liv–Plantur	+ 45"

General classification after Stage 3
Rank	Rider	Team	Time
1	Emma Johansson (SWE)	Orica–GreenEDGE	7h 15' 34"
2	Amalie Dideriksen (DEN)	Boels–Dolmans	+ 12"
3	Elena Cecchini (ITA)	Lotto–Soudal Ladies	+ 13"
4	Amy Pieters (NED)	Team Liv–Plantur	+ 15"
5	Katarzyna Niewiadoma (POL)	Rabobank-Liv Woman Cycling Team	+ 27"
6	Anna van der Breggen (NED)	Rabobank-Liv Woman Cycling Team	+ 27"
7	Sofie De Vuyst (BEL)	Lensworld.eu–Zannata	+ 27"
8	Tatiana Guderzo (ITA)	Team Hitec Products	+ 27"
9	Anna Plichta (POL)		+ 36"
10	Lieselot Decroix (BEL)	Lotto–Soudal Ladies	+ 50"

=== Stage 4 ===
11 September – Lierde to Geraardsbergen, 113.5 km (70.5 mi)

Stage 4 result
Rank	Rider	Team	Time
1	Anna van der Breggen (NED)	Rabobank-Liv Woman Cycling Team	3h 02' 27"
2	Amalie Dideriksen (DEN)	Boels–Dolmans	+ 1"
3	Katarzyna Niewiadoma (POL)	Rabobank-Liv Woman Cycling Team	+ 1"
4	Emma Johansson (SWE)	Orica–GreenEDGE	+ 1"
5	Elena Cecchini (ITA)	Lotto–Soudal Ladies	+ 5"
6	Amy Pieters (NED)	Team Liv–Plantur	+ 21"
7	Anna Plichta (POL)		+ 1' 42"
8	Anisha Vekemans (BEL)	Lotto–Soudal Ladies	+ 1' 48"
9	Silvija Latozaite (LTU)		+ 1' 49"
10	Floortje Mackaij (NED)	Team Liv–Plantur	+ 1' 51"

General classification after Stage 4
Rank	Rider	Team	Time
1	Emma Johansson (SWE)	Orica–GreenEDGE	10h 18' 02"
2	Amalie Dideriksen (DEN)	Boels–Dolmans	+ 6"
3	Anna van der Breggen (NED)	Rabobank-Liv Woman Cycling Team	+ 13"
4	Elena Cecchini (ITA)	Lotto–Soudal Ladies	+ 15"
5	Katarzyna Niewiadoma (POL)	Rabobank-Liv Woman Cycling Team	+ 22"
6	Amy Pieters (NED)	Team Liv–Plantur	+ 35"
7	Anna Plichta (POL)		+ 2' 17"
8	Sofie De Vuyst (BEL)	Lensworld.eu–Zannata	+ 2' 17"
9	Lieselot Decroix (BEL)	Lotto–Soudal Ladies	+ 2' 43"
10	Carlee Taylor (AUS)	Lotto–Soudal Ladies	+ 2' 43"

== Classification leadership ==
Stage	Winner	General classification	Sprints classification	Mountains classification	Young rider classification	Belgian Riders	Combativity award	Team classification
1	Natalie van Gogh	Natalie van Gogh	Natalie van Gogh	not award	Anna Plichta			VolkerWessels Women Cyclingteam
2	Amalie Dideriksen	Anna Plichta						
3	Floortje Mackaij	Emma Johansson						
4	Anna van der Breggen	Emma Johansson						
Final Classification		Emma Johansson	Amalie Diederiksen	Anna van der Breggen	Amalie Diederiksen			Netherlands national team

== See also ==
- 2015 in women's road cycling
