= Ronde van Overijssel (women) =

Dutch one-day road cycling race

Race details
- Date: May
- Region: Netherlands
- Discipline: Road

History
- First edition: 2014
- Editions: 2
- Final edition: 2015
- First winner: Lisa Brennauer (DEU)
- Most wins: No repeat winners
- Final winner: Lauren Kitchen (AUS)

The Ronde van Overijssel was an elite women's professional one-day road bicycle race held in the Netherlands in 2014 and 2015, and was rated by the UCI as a 1.1 race.

== Past winners ==
Year	Country	Rider	Team
2014	Germany	Lisa Brennauer	Specialized–lululemon
2015	Australia	Lauren Kitchen	Team Hitec Products
