= Belle de Gast =

Dutch cyclist (born 1991)

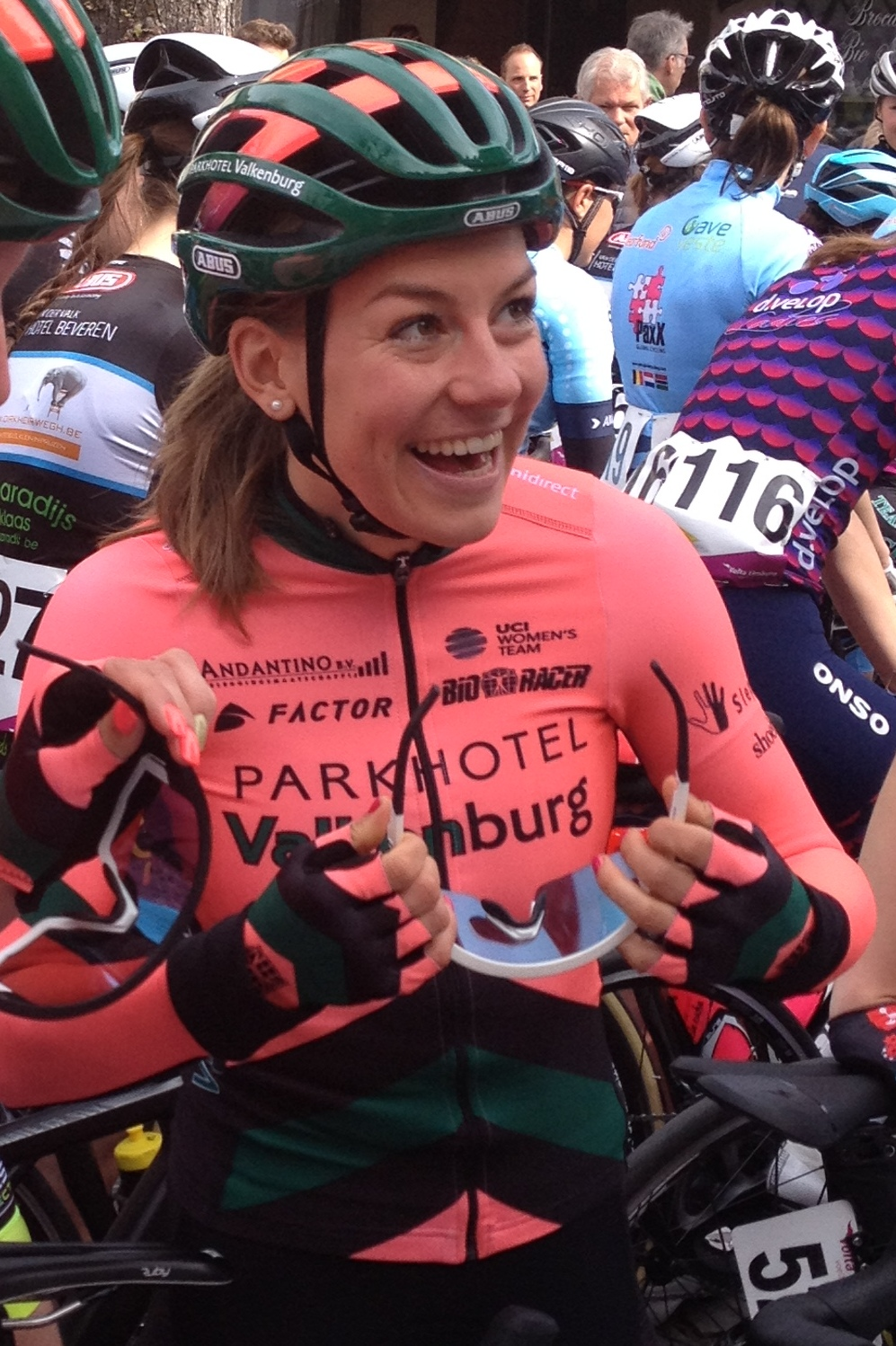
- De Gast at the 2019 Volta Limburg Classic

Personal information
- Full name: Belle de Gast
- Born: 4 February 1991 (age 35) Utrecht, Netherlands

Cycling career
- Sport: Cycling
- Current team: Retired
- Discipline: Road
- Role: Rider

Professional team
- 2018–2022: Parkhotel Valkenburg

Belle de Gast (born 4 February 1991) is a Dutch former professional racing cyclist, who rode professionally between 2018 and 2022 – entirely for UCI Women's Continental Team Parkhotel Valkenburg.
