= Dirk Baldinger =

German cyclist

Personal information
- Born: 27 August 1971 (age 55): Freiburg im Breisgau, West Germany

Cycling career
- Sport: Cycling
- Current team: Ceratizit Pro Cycling
- Discipline: Road
- Role: Rider (retired); Directeur sportif

Professional teams
- 1995–1997: Polti–Granarolo–Santini
- 1998–1999: Team Telekom
- 2000–2001: Nurnberger

Managerial teams
- 2015–2016: Bigla Pro Cycling Team
- 2018–: WNT–Rotor Pro Cycling

Dirk Baldinger (born 27 August 1971) is a German former professional racing cyclist who now works as a directeur sportif for UCI Women's Continental Team Ceratizit Pro Cycling. He rode in two editions of the Tour de France, two editions of the Giro d'Italia, and two editions of the Vuelta a España.
