= Eileen Roe =

Scottish racing cyclist

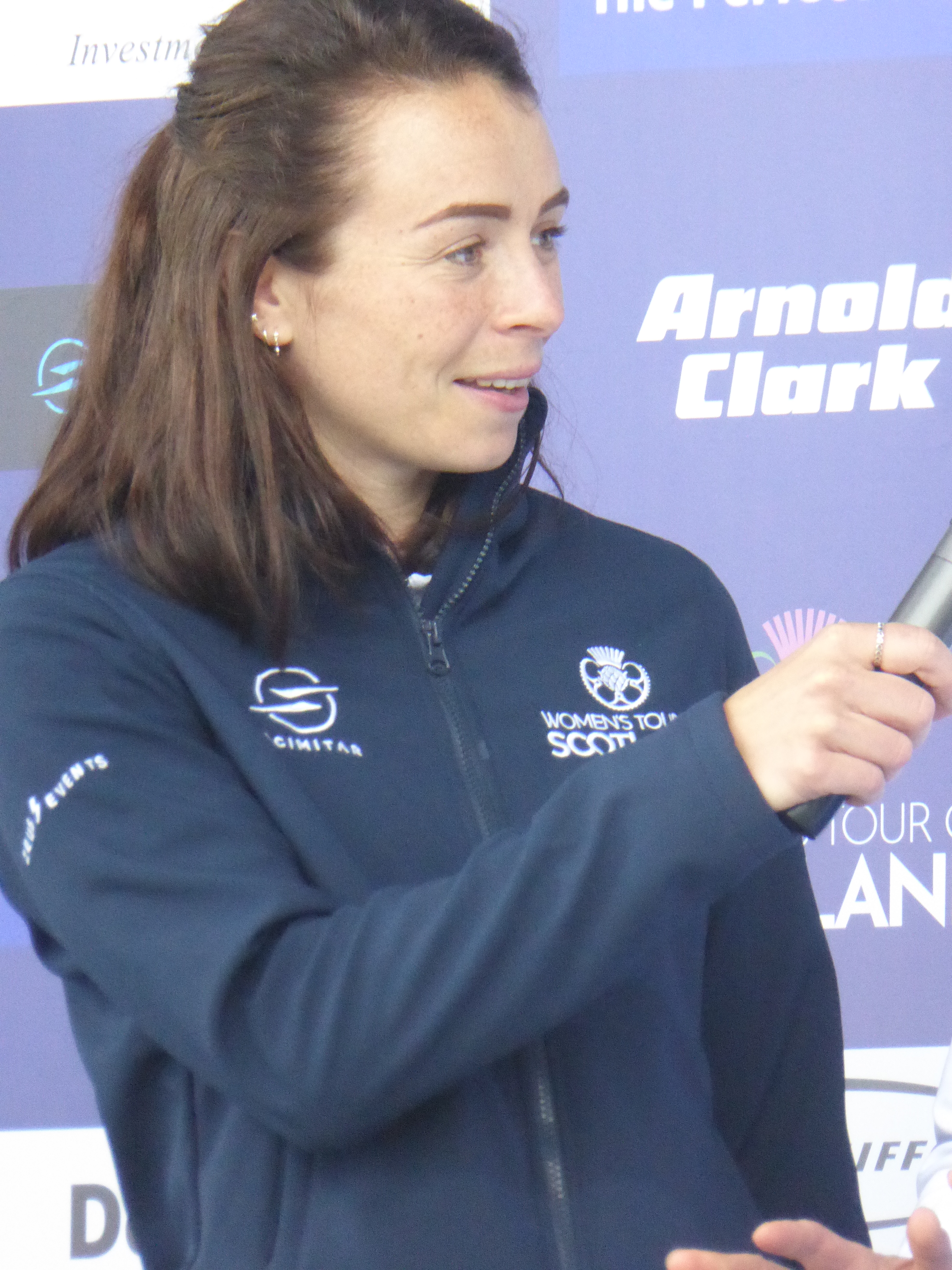
- Roe at the 2019 Women's Tour of Scotland

Personal information
- Full name: Eileen Roe
- Born: 24 September 1989 (age 37) Dunfermline, Fife, United Kingdom
- Height: 1.65 m (5 ft 5 in)
- Weight: 58 kg (128 lb; 9.1 st)

Cycling career
- Sport: Cycling
- Current team: Retired
- Disciplines: Road; Track; Cyclo-cross; Mountain biking
- Role: Rider
- Rider type: Sprinter

Amateur teams
- 2009: Ladies Cycling Team Tubanters
- 2011: Moving Ladies
- 2013: Breast Cancer Care Cycling Team
- 2014: Starley–Primal
- 2015: WV Breda–Manieu.nl Ladies Team (guest)
- 2016: Team WNT (guest)
- 2018: Cairn Velo
- 2018–2019: Dooleys Cycles

Professional teams
- 2012: Team Ibis Cycles
- 2014–2015: Wiggle–Honda
- 2016: Lares–Waowdeals
- 2017–2018: Team WNT

Eileen Roe (born 24 September 1989) is a Scottish former racing cyclist, who competed between 2008 and 2019, including for UCI Women's Teams Wiggle–Honda, Lares–Waowdeals and WNT–Rotor Pro Cycling. Roe was the winner of the 2014 and 2016 British National Circuit Race Championships.

== Biography ==
Born in Dunfermline, Roe began competitive cycling at the age of 10. She has been employed at the Edinburgh Bicycle Cooperative on a part-time basis for several years, which allowed her the time to dedicate to her cycling career. In October 2014 the Wiggle–Honda team announced that Roe would join them with immediate effect to ride in the Australian criterium season and the subsequent 2015 season. Roe joined Belgian team Lares–Waowdeals for the 2016 season. At the start of 2017, Roe became a member of the Team WNT squad.

== Major results ==
2008
1st 800m, National Grass Track Championships
2012
1st Round 3, Johnson Health Tech Grand Prix Series, Colchester
2nd Criterium, National Road Championships
National Track Championships

3rd Madison
3rd Team pursuit

2013
2nd Overall Surf & Turf Weekend

1st Stage 3

2nd Points race, Revolution – Round 2, Glasgow
3rd Road race, Scottish Road Championships
2014
1st Criterium, National Road Championships
1st Overall Matrix Fitness Grand Prix Series

1st Round 2, Peterborough
1st Round 5, Woking

3rd Stan Siejka Launceston Cycling Classic
2015
2nd Criterium, National Road Championships
2nd Overall Rás na mBan

1st Stage 6

2nd Women's Tour de Yorkshire
2nd London Nocturne
10th Marianne Vos Classic
2016
1st Criterium, National Road Championships
1st Round 1, Matrix Fitness Grand Prix Series, Motherwell
Rás na mBan

1st Points classification
1st Stage 6

3rd Dwars door Vlaanderen
9th Overall BeNe Ladies Tour
