= Esther van Veen =

Dutch cyclist (born 1990)

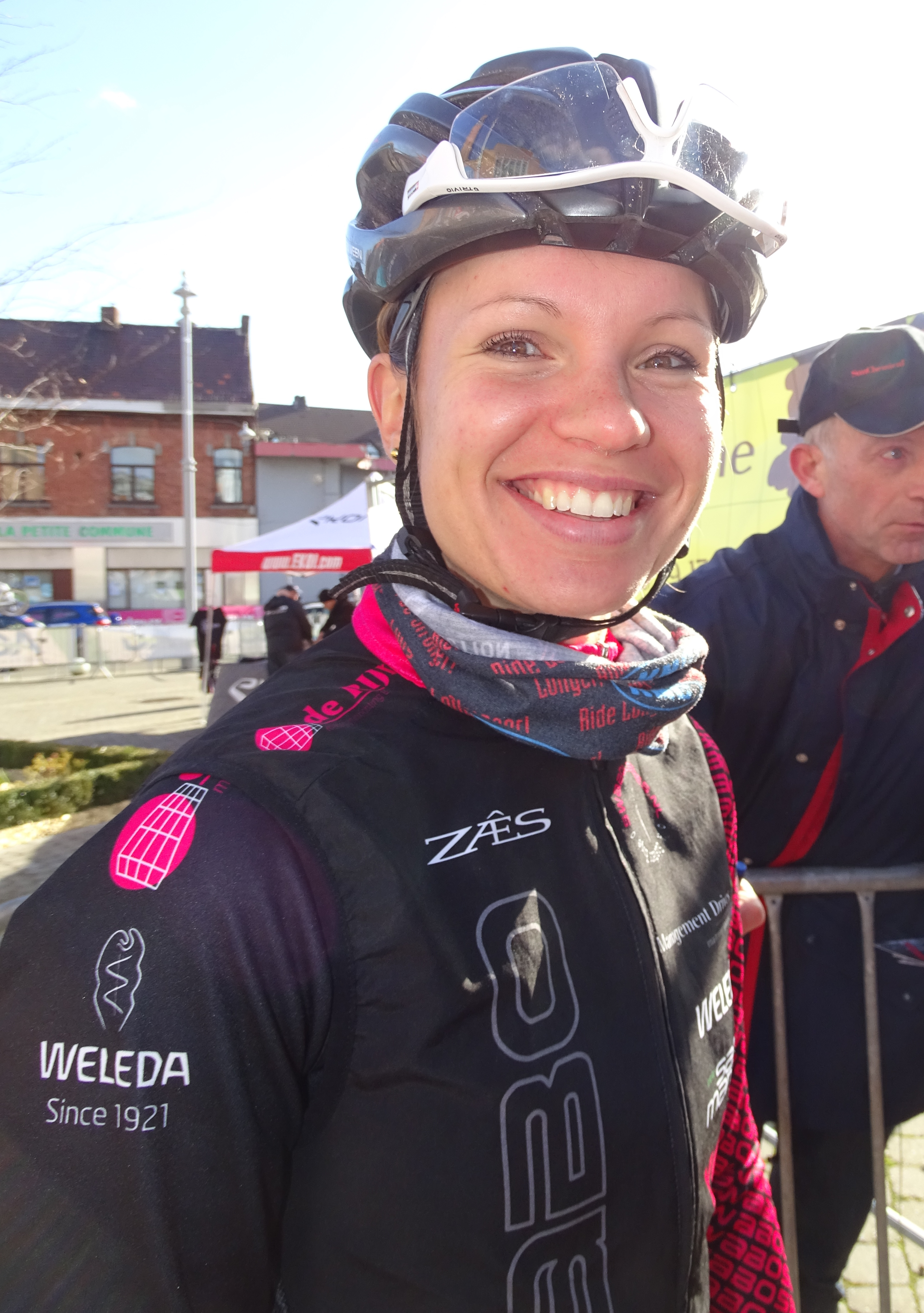
- Van Veen in 2016

Personal information
- Full name: Esther van Veen
- Born: 27 September 1990 (age 36) Heemskerk, Netherlands

Cycling career
- Sport: Cycling
- Current team: VolkerWessels Women Cyclingteam
- Discipline: Road
- Role: Rider

Amateur team
- 2016: Swaboladies.nl

Professional team
- 2017–: Parkhotel Valkenburg–Destil

Esther van Veen (born 27 September 1990) is a Dutch racing cyclist, who currently rides for UCI Women's Continental Team VolkerWessels Women Cyclingteam. She rode for Parkhotel Valkenburg in the women's team time trial event at the 2018 UCI Road World Championships.
