= Ceratizit Pro Cycling =

German cycling team

Team information
- UCI code: WNT (2014–2024); CTC (2025)
- Registered: United Kingdom (2014–2018); Germany (2019–2025)
- Founded: 2014
- Disciplines: Road; Track
- Status: UK National (2014–2016); UCI Women's Team (2017–2019); UCI Women's Continental Team (2020–2023); UCI Women's WorldTeam (2024–2025)
- Bicycles: Orbea
- Website: Team home page

Key personnel
- General manager: Claude Sun
- Team managers: Dirk Baldinger; Carmen Small

Team name history
- 2014–2016 2017 2018–2019 2020–2024 2025: Team WNT; Team WNT Pro Cycling; WNT–Rotor Pro Cycling; Ceratizit–WNT Pro Cycling; Ceratizit Pro Cycling

Ceratizit Pro Cycling (UCI code: CTC) was a professional women's cycling team, based in Kempten, Germany, which competed in elite road bicycle racing events such as the UCI Women's World Tour. The team ceased racing in September 2025 after the Ceratizit Group concluded its sponsorship.

== History ==
The team was founded in 2014 as an amateur club team in Sheffield / UK competing in regional and national races with the occasional UCI level race. After three years the team was transformed from an amateur team into a professional UCI team, and is invited to compete in major races all over Europe. The team itself no longer consists purely of British riders. Since 2019 the team includes women of seven different countries (Germany, Austria, Netherlands, Italy, Spain, France and Canada) giving it an even greater international flavour. 2019 saw a big expansion and inclusion of high-level riders into the team roster such as Kirsten Wild, Lisa Brennauer and Ane Santesteban. Due this expansion the team made the step-up into the top 10 of the UCI-ranking, with a ranking of 7th place. In 2020 the team signed Maria Giulia Confalonieri of Italy and Julie Leth of Denmark, both double European Champions.

=== 2017 ===
Ahead of the 2017 season, WNT made another leap in the team's progression by applying for a UCI Women's team licence, with former Scottish Cycling head coach Graeme Herd as their directeur sportif. Expanding its roster outside the UK and Ireland, gaining Austrian Anna Badegruber and Luxembourger Elise Maes from Austrian team Vitalogic Astrokalb Radunion Nö as it stepped away from its UCI Women licence in 2017.

The team won its first professional race in its first outing as a UCI team in March 2017, on stage 4 of Setmana Ciclista Valenciana when Irish Champion Lydia Boylan soloed to victory. The team's second UCI victory came at the Lotto Thüringen Ladies Tour on stage 3, when Hayley Simmonds attacked in the closing kilometres, taking a solo victory of over a minute, and consequently moved into the yellow jersey. Simmonds finished 3rd place on general classification behind Lisa Brennauer.

At the end of 2017, the team's service course moved from the UK to Reutte, Austria, the hometown of WNT's parent company, Ceratizit, although the team's address registered with the Union Cycliste Internationale was still located in Sheffield.

=== 2018 ===
2018 saw a further internationalisation of the roster, with the additions of German Lea Lin Teutenberg and Dutchwoman Aafke Soet. Spanish bicycle component manufacturer, Rotor signed onto Team WNT as a second naming sponsor, setting the team to be the first to race full-time on hydraulic shifting and braking groupset. WNT-Rotor took on a greater Spanish influence with its switch from long time frame partner Specialized to Orbea. The team also joined as one of five UCI women's teams to transition to disc brakes in 2018, moving from its already new hydraulic Rotor rim brake groupset to debut the disc brake version at Dwars door Vlaanderen.

Shortly after the team completed Setmana Ciclista Valenciana, it was announced that Graeme Herd would leave the team immediately, with Dirk Baldinger taking up Herd's role as DS. Former Cervélo–Bigla Pro Cycling rider, Canadian Gabrielle Pilote-Fortin was a late signing for 2018 at the end of March.

Half the team's then ten rider roster were selected to compete on the road and track at the 2018 Commonwealth Games; for Northern Ireland, Lydia Boylan, for Wales, Hayley Jones, for Scotland, Eileen Roe, and for England Melissa Lowther and Hayley Simmonds. While Melissa Lowther had been selected for both the time trial and road race, but due to an administrative error by Team England, Lowther was barred from starting the individual time trial. Hayley Simmonds earned a bronze medal in the Commonwealth Games individual time trial, behind recent ITT world championship medallist Katrin Garfoot and former time trial world champion Linda Villumsen.

Aafke Soet earned WNT Rotor's first win of the 2018 season at the start of April by winning the last stage of the Healthy Ageing Tour in solo breakaway, the victory was also her first-ever elite-level win. Soet would back up that road race win at her next race appearance, with the fastest time in the time trial event at Omloop van Borsele.

=== 2019 ===
The Season 2019 started very successfully for the WNT-ROTOR Pro Cycling Team. After wins at the Six Days in Bremen (Germany) on the track the new team member Clara Koppenburg won stage 3 of the Seltmana Ciclista Valenciana and took over the General Classification jersey. The team defended this jersey on stage 4 and also won the team classification. One-week later Kirsten Wild and Lisa Brennauer won in total 5 medals at the Track World Championships in Pruszków, Poland; Wild won gold in the Madison and omnium, Silver in the scratch race and Bronze in the points race, while Brennauer won a silver medal in the individual pursuit and a new German record).

The team won its first UCI Women's World Tour race at Driedaagse Brugge-De Panne with Kirsten Wild who won the bunch sprint after a big lead out from Lisa Brennauer. Three days later, Kirsten Wild won Gent–Wevelgem, becoming the first rider to win the Belgian spring classic twice.

In total the team amassed 15 victories in road racing during the 2019 season with four different riders. Kathrin Hammes won the overall classification of the Lotto Thüringen Ladies Tour after being in the breakaway on stage 1. The team helped defended the yellow, where Kathrin was able to win her home tour by 11 seconds.

On 28 November 2019, the team announced that the CERATIZIT Group, who are the parent company of WNT would be joining as title sponsor of the team.

== Team roster ==
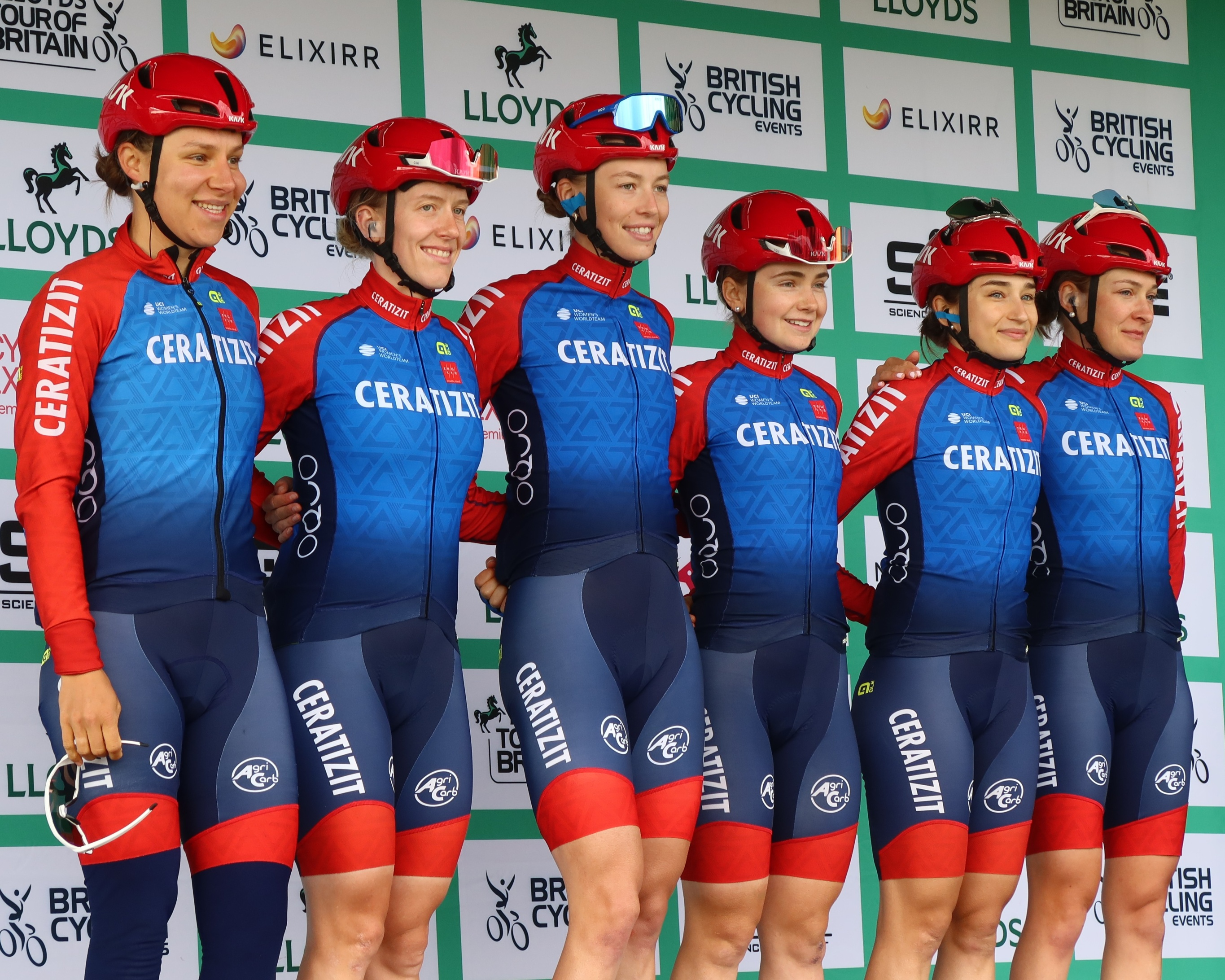
At the Tour of Britain in 2025

As of 15 March 2025.

Rider	Date of birth
Sandra Alonso (ESP)	19 August 1998 (age 28)
Franziska Brauße (GER)	20 November 1998 (age 27)
Kristýna Burlová (CZE)	25 March 2002 (age 24)
Mylène de Zoete (NED)	3 January 1999 (age 27)
Lana Eberle (GER)	28 November 2003 (age 22)
Sara Fiorin (ITA)	24 September 2003 (age 22)
Fariba Hashimi (AFG)	22 April 2003 (age 23)

Rider	Date of birth
Daniek Hengeveld (NED)	17 November 2002 (age 23)
Marta Jaskulska (POL)	25 March 2000 (age 26)
Célia Le Mouel (FRA)	20 July 2000 (age 26)
Dilyxine Miermont (FRA)	16 May 2000 (age 26)
Sarah Van Dam (CAN)	4 December 2001 (age 24)
Petra Zsankó (HUN)	18 February 2001 (age 25)
Elena Hartmann (SUI)	12 December 1990 (age 35)

== Major wins ==
2017
Stage 4 Semana Ciclista Valenciana, Lydia Boylan
Stage 3 Thüringen Rundfahrt der Frauen, Hayley Simmonds
Round 2 Stoke-on-Trent Tour Series, Katie Archibald
Round 6 Bath Tour Series, Eileen Roe
Round 7 Motherwell Tour Series, Eileen Roe
Round 8 Team Time Trial, Stevenage Tour Series, Katie Archibald, Emily Kay, Keira McVitty, Gabriella Shaw, Lydia Boylan

2018
Stage 5 Healthy Ageing Tour, Aafke Soet
Omloop van Borsele Time Trial, Aafke Soet
Young rider classification Emakumeen Euskal Bira, Aafke Soet

2019
Overall Setmana Ciclista Valenciana, Clara Koppenburg

Stage 3, Clara Koppenburg

1st Three Days of De Panne, Kirsten Wild
1st Gent–Wevelgem, Kirsten Wild
Stages 3 & 5 Healthy Ageing Tour, Kirsten Wild
Stage 4b Healthy Ageing Tour, Lisa Brennauer
Overall Festival Elsy Jacobs, Lisa Brennauer

Points classification, Lisa Brennauer
Stage 2, Lisa Brennauer

Basque rider classification Emakumeen Euskal Bira, Ane Santesteban
Overall Thüringen Rundfahrt der Frauen, Kathrin Hammes
Stages 1 & 2 Tour de Bretagne Féminin, Kirsten Wild
Overall Madrid Challenge by La Vuelta Lisa Brennauer

Stage 1 (ITT), Lisa Brennauer

2021
La Picto–Charentaise, Marta Lach

2022
Stage 5 Bretagne Ladies Tour, Marta Lach
Stage 2 Tour of Uppsala, Hanna Nilsson
Stage 1 Giro della Toscana Int. Femminile, Martina Fidanza
Overall Tour de la Semois, Maria Giulia Confalonieri
Stage 3 Tour de Romandie, Marta Lach

2023
Women Cycling Pro Costa De Almería, Arianna Fidanza
Overall Tour de Normandie, Cédrine Kerbaol

Stage 2, Cédrine Kerbaol

Ronde de Mouscron, Martina Fidanza
Stage 1 Bretagne Ladies Tour, Marta Lach
Ronde van Honselersdijk, Mylene de Zoete
Prologue Giro Toscana Int. Femminile, Franziska Brauss
Young rider classification Tour de France, Cédrine Kerbaol
GP Fourmies Women, Marta Lach
Grisette Grand Prix de Wallonie, Marta Lach
Stage 1 Tour of Chongming Island, Mylene de Zoete

2024
Vuelta a la Comunitat Valenciana Feminas, Cédrine Kerbaol
Stage 2 Tour de Normandie, Sandra Alonso
CERATIZIT Festival Elsy Jacobs à Garnich, Marta Lach
CERATIZIT Festival Elsy Jacobs à Luxembourg, Marta Lach
Durango-Durango Emakumeen Saria, Cédrine Kerbaol
GP Mazda Schelkens, Arianna Fidanza
Dwars door de Westhoek, Kathrin Schweinberger
Stages 2 & 3 Thüringen Ladies Tour, Arianna Fidanza
Stage 6 Thüringen Ladies Tour, Sandra Alonso
Stage 6 Tour de France, Cédrine Kerbaol

== National, European and World Championships ==
2015
Irish Road Race, Lydia Boylan
2016
Irish Road Race, Lydia Boylan
2017
British Track (Individual pursuit), Katie Archibald
British Track (Points race), Katie Archibald
British Track (Scratch race), Katie Archibald
British Track (Omnium), Katie Archibald
British Criterium, Katie Archibald
World Track (Omnium), Katie Archibald
Irish Road Race, Lydia Boylan
Irish Track (Scratch race), Lydia Boylan
European Track (Individual pursuit), Katie Archibald
European Track (Omnium), Katie Archibald
2018
Irish Track (Omnium), Lydia Boylan
European U23 Time Trial, Aafke Soet
Irish Track (Scratch Race), Lydia Boylan
2019
World Track (Omnium), Kirsten Wild
World Track (Madison), Kirsten Wild
European Track (Omnium), Kirsten Wild
European Track (Elimination Race), Kirsten Wild
European Track (Individual Pursuit), Franziska Brausse
European Track (U23 Individual Pursuit), Franziska Brausse
German Road Race, Lisa Brennauer
German Track (Madison), Franziska Brausse
German Track (Madison), Lin Teutenberg
German Track (Omnium), Franziska Brausse
German Track (Team Pursuit), Franziska Brausse
German Track (Individual Pursuit), Franziska Brausse

2020
World Track (Madison), Kirsten Wild
World Track (Scratch), Kirsten Wild
Denmark Track (Omnium), Julie Leth
German Road Race, Lisa Brennauer
European Team Time Trial, Lisa Brennauer
Denmark Track (Individual Sprint), Julie Leth
European U23 Track (Individual pursuit), Franziska Brauße

2021
German Time Trial, Lisa Brennauer
German Road Race, Lisa Brennauer
Olympic Games Track (Team pursuit), Franziska Brauße
Olympic Games Track (Team pursuit), Lisa Brennauer
World Mixed Team Time Trial, Lisa Brennauer
European (Individual pursuit), Lisa Brennauer
European (Team pursuit), Lisa Brennauer
European (Team pursuit),Franziska Brauße
World Track (Madison), Kirsten Wild
World Track (Team pursuit), Lisa Brennauer
World Track (Team pursuit), Franziska Brauße
World Track (Individual pursuit), Lisa Brennauer

2022
German Time Trial, Lisa Brennauer
Austria Track (Omnium), Kathrin Schweinberger
Austria Track (Madison), Kathrin Schweinberger
Austria Track (Points race), Kathrin Schweinberger
Austria Track (Scratch race), Kathrin Schweinberger
World Track (Individual pursuit), Franziska Brauße
World Track (Team pursuit), Martina Fidanza
World Track (Scratch race), Martina Fidanza

2023
Luxembourg U23 Time Trial, Nina Berton
France Time Trial, Cédrine Kerbaol

2024
Poland Time Trial, Marta Jaskulska
