= Ceratizit =

Luxembourg tool manufacturing company

CERATIZIT Group S.A.
- Company type: corporation
- Industry: Machine tools
- Predecessor: Plansee Tizit and CERAMETAL
- Founded: 2002; 24 years ago
- Founder: Nicolas Lanners
- Headquarters: Mamer, Luxembourg
- Area served: Worldwide
- Key people: Jacques Lanners (Managing Director)
- Products: Powder-metallurgical, sintered hard metal products
- Owner: Plansee Group
- Number of employees: 9,000 (2025)
- Website: www.ceratizit.com

The Ceratizit Group is a Luxembourg manufacturer of machine tool and hard material products for wear protection and cutting tools. It is 100% owned by Plansee Group and operates 34 production facilities worldwide. The company's headquarters are located in Mamer, Luxembourg.

== History ==
=== Predecessors and foundation ===
In 1948, the cooperation started between Luuchtefabrik (renamed CERAMETAL in to 1949) and the company then known as Plansee GmbH.

In 1979, CERAMETAL launched production operations in the USA and the first ceramic parts were manufactured in 1988.

In 1996, Instrument AG in Bulgaria was incorporated in Plansee Tizit while, at the same time, collaboration got underway with Siel to form Siel Tizit Ltd. in the Indian city of Kolkata.

CERATIZIT S.A. was created in 2002 as the result of a merger between CERAMETAL (founded in 1931) and Plansee Tizit (founded in 1985). CERAMETAL was founded in Walferdange, Luxembourg, by Nicolas Lanners.

=== Growth ===
Following the start-up of the company in 2002, it opened sales offices in Brazil, Poland, Hungary and the Czech Republic.

In 2007, new administrative premises were unveiled in Mamer and Reutte, while sales and marketing offices were opened in China, Mexico and Spain. In 2007, Ceratizit acquired Newcomer Products, Inc., a private company based in Latrobe/Pennsylvania.

In 2010, Ceratizit and CB Carbide combined their Asian activities within the joint venture company CB-CERATIZIT in which both Ceratizit and the members of CB Carbide possess a 50% holding.

In 2011, Ceratizit moved its United States regional headquarters from Latrobe, PA to Warren, Michigan.

As of 2022, it had 7,000 employees and more than 25 production sites in Europe, North America and Asia, and a sales network of over 70 branch offices.

== Patents ==
The company holds more than 1,000 patents worldwide and manufactured more than 10 billion sintered parts in 2010.

== Sponsorships ==
Ceratizit has sponsored the British Superbike Championship for nine consecutive years since 2014; Ceratizit is the sponsor title for the Teams' Championship. They are also the title sponsor of the Ceratizit Pro Cycling team.
