= Chanella Stougje =

Dutch cyclist

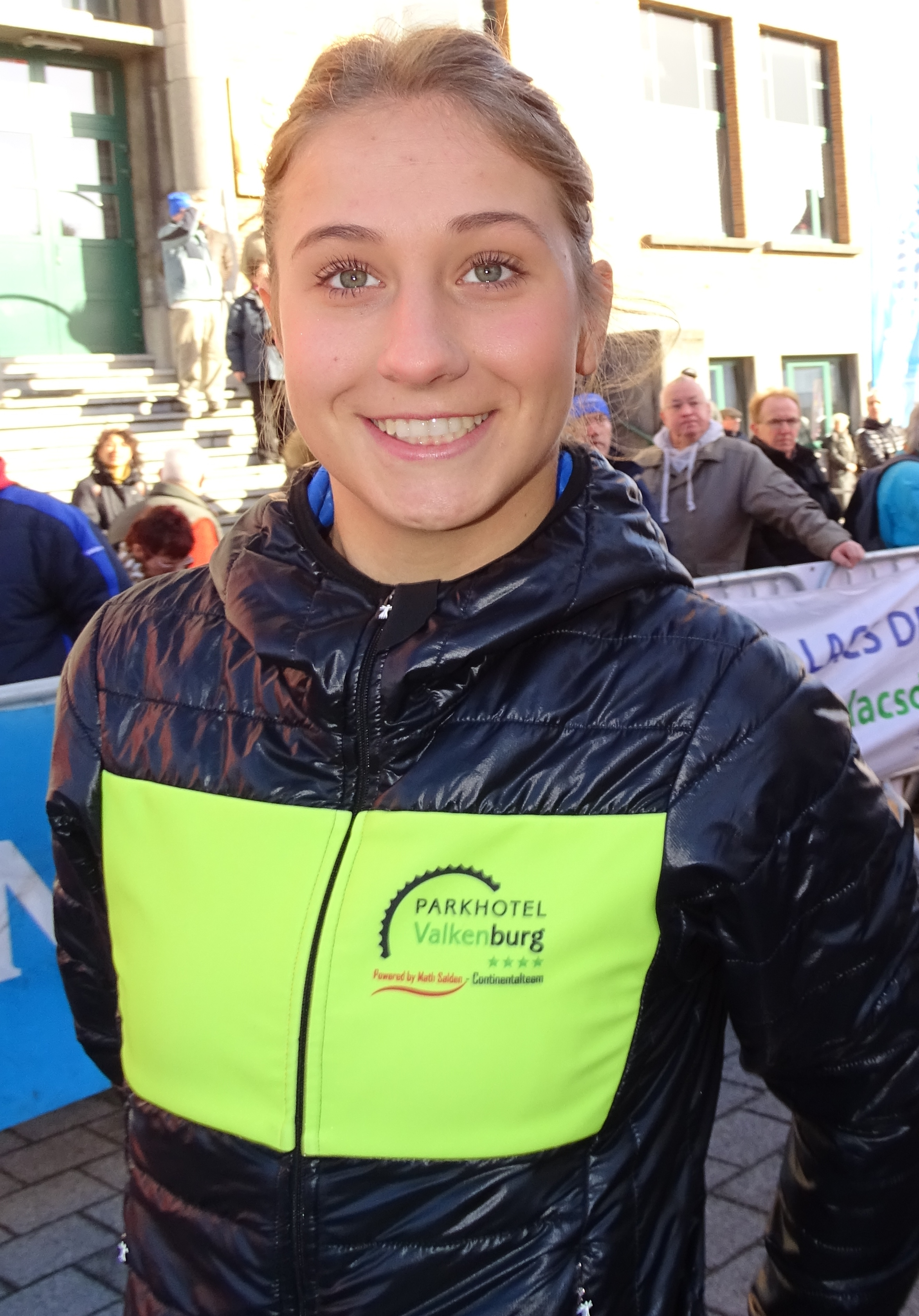
- Stougje in 2016.

Personal information
- Full name: Chanella Stougje
- Born: 23 October 1996 (age 29) Zuidland, Netherlands

Cycling career
- Sport: Cycling
- Current team: Retired
- Discipline: Road
- Role: Rider

Professional teams
- 2015–2018: Parkhotel Valkenburg Continental Team
- 2019: Hitec Products–Birk Sport

Chanella Stougje (born 23 October 1996) is a Dutch hairdresser and former professional racing cyclist, who rode professionally between 2015 and 2019 for the Parkhotel Valkenburg and Hitec Products–Birk Sport teams. She was the best young rider at the one-day 2016 Philadelphia Cycling Classic.

In the autumn of 2019, Stougje decided to end her sports career and to focus on social activities.

== Major results ==
2014
National Junior Road Championships

2nd Time trial
3rd Road race

UEC European Junior Road Championships

9th Road race
10th Time trial

2015
7th EPZ Omloop van Borsele
7th Erondegemse Pijl
2016
7th Diamond Tour
9th Ronde van Gelderland

== See also ==
- 2015 Parkhotel Valkenburg Continental Team season
