= 2018 Healthy Ageing Tour =

Race details
- Dates: 4–8 April 2018
- Stages: 5 (including 1 split-stage)
- Distance: 460.2 km (286.0 mi)
- Winning time: 11h 20' 09"

Results
Jersey awarded to the overall winner	Winner	Amy Pieters (NED)	(Boels–Dolmans)
	Second	Chantal Blaak (NED)	(Boels–Dolmans)
	Third	Christine Majerus (LUX)	(Boels–Dolmans)
Jersey awarded to the points classification winner	Points	Kirsten Wild (NED)	(Wiggle High5)
Jersey awarded to the youth classification winner	Youth	Lisa Klein (GER)	(Canyon//SRAM)
Jersey awarded to the sprints classification winner	Sprints	Natalie van Gogh (NED)	(Parkhotel Valkenburg)
	Team	Boels–Dolmans	

The 2018 Healthy Ageing Tour was a women's cycle stage race that was held in the Netherlands from 4 to 8 April 2018. The 2018 edition of the race was the eighth running of the Healthy Ageing Tour, being held with a UCI rating of 2.1.

The race was marked by the performance of the entire Boels–Dolmans team; aside from winning the team time trial stage, their riders Anna van der Breggen, Amy Pieters and Chantal Blaak won three others. In the overall classification, Pieters won by 22 seconds ahead of Blaak, while Christine Majerus completed the podium – just ahead of van der Breggen, in a Boels–Dolmans 1–2–3–4 – a further 20 seconds in arrears. The other major jerseys were won by Kirsten Wild (points for Wiggle High5), Natalie van Gogh (sprints for Parkhotel Valkenburg) and Lisa Klein (young rider for Canyon//SRAM).

== Teams ==
A total of 20 teams competed in the race, including 9 UCI Women's Teams.

UCI Women's Teams

- Boels–Dolmans
- Canyon//SRAM
- Hitec Products–Birk Sport
- Parkhotel Valkenburg
- Servetto–Stradalli Cycle–Alurecycling
- Team Virtu Cycling
- WaowDeals Pro Cycling
- Wiggle High5
- WNT–Rotor Pro Cycling

National teams

- Denmark
- Germany
- Netherlands

Regional teams

- Drenthe
- Midden–Jan van Arckel
- Noord NWVG–UPLUS
- Rijnmond–Restore
- Swaboladies.nl
- Zuid-West–WV West Vlaanderen

Other teams

- Max-Solar Lindig Team
- NCC Group–Kuota–Torelli

== Route ==
Stage schedule
Stage	Date	Route	Distance	Type	Winner
1	4 April	Heerenveen to Heerenveen	8 km (5.0 mi)	Individual time trial	Anna van der Breggen (NED)
2	5 April	Westerkwartier to Grootegast	131.3 km (81.6 mi)	Flat stage	Amy Pieters (NED)
3a	6 April	Oldambt to Winschoten	66.2 km (41.1 mi)	Flat stage	Kirsten Wild (NED)
3b	6 April	Stadskanaal to Stadskanaal	17.5 km (10.9 mi)	Team time trial	Boels–Dolmans
4	7 April	Hogeland to Winsum	142.9 km (88.8 mi)	Flat stage	Chantal Blaak (NED)
5	8 April	Groningen to Groningen	94.3 km (58.6 mi)	Flat stage	Aafke Soet (NED)

== Stages ==
=== Stage 1 ===
4 April 2018 — Heerenveen to Heerenveen, 8 km (5.0 mi), individual time trial (ITT)

Result of Stage 1 & General classification after Stage 1
Rank	Rider	Team	Time
1	Anna van der Breggen (NED)	Boels–Dolmans	10' 35"
2	Chantal Blaak (NED)	Boels–Dolmans	+ 2"
3	Lisa Brennauer (GER)	Wiggle High5	+ 10"
4	Lisa Klein (GER)	Canyon//SRAM	+ 13"
5	Kirsten Wild (NED)	Wiggle High5	+ 13"
6	Amy Pieters (NED)	Boels–Dolmans	+ 15"
7	Alice Barnes (GBR)	Canyon//SRAM	+ 20"
8	Christine Majerus (LUX)	Boels–Dolmans	+ 25"
9	Mieke Kröger (GER)	Team Virtu Cycling	+ 26"
10	Trixi Worrack (GER)	Canyon//SRAM	+ 29"

=== Stage 2 ===
5 April 2018 — Westerkwartier to Grootegast, 131.3 km (81.6 mi)

Result of Stage 2
Rank	Rider	Team	Time
1	Amy Pieters (NED)	Boels–Dolmans	3h 22' 01"
2	Alice Barnes (GBR)	Canyon//SRAM	+ 0"
3	Anna van der Breggen (NED)	Boels–Dolmans	+ 35"
4	Kirsten Wild (NED)	Wiggle High5	+ 35"
5	Chantal Blaak (NED)	Boels–Dolmans	+ 35"
6	Lisa Klein (GER)	Canyon//SRAM	+ 35"
7	Anouska Koster (NED)	WaowDeals Pro Cycling	+ 35"
8	Maaike Boogaard (NED)	Netherlands (national team)	+ 35"
9	Natalie van Gogh (NED)	Parkhotel Valkenburg	+ 35"
10	Christine Majerus (LUX)	Boels–Dolmans	+ 35"

General classification after Stage 2
Rank	Rider	Team	Time
1	Amy Pieters (NED)	Boels–Dolmans	3h 32' 40"
2	Alice Barnes (GBR)	Canyon//SRAM	+ 10"
3	Anna van der Breggen (NED)	Boels–Dolmans	+ 25"
4	Chantal Blaak (NED)	Boels–Dolmans	+ 30"
5	Lisa Klein (GER)	Canyon//SRAM	+ 44"
6	Kirsten Wild (NED)	Wiggle High5	+ 44"
7	Lisa Brennauer (GER)	Wiggle High5	+ 54"
8	Christine Majerus (LUX)	Boels–Dolmans	+ 56"
9	Trixi Worrack (GER)	Canyon//SRAM	+ 1' 00"
10	Anouska Koster (NED)	WaowDeals Pro Cycling	+ 1' 04"

=== Stage 3a ===
6 April 2018 — Oldambt to Winschoten, 66.2 km (41.1 mi)

Result of Stage 3a
Rank	Rider	Team	Time
1	Kirsten Wild (NED)	Wiggle High5	1h 33' 00"
2	Christine Majerus (LUX)	Boels–Dolmans	+ 0"
3	Lisa Klein (GER)	Canyon//SRAM	+ 0"
4	Lorena Wiebes (NED)	Parkhotel Valkenburg	+ 0"
5	Susanne Andersen (NOR)	Hitec Products–Birk Sport	+ 0"
6	Barbara Guarischi (ITA)	Team Virtu Cycling	+ 0"
7	Riejanne Markus (NED)	WaowDeals Pro Cycling	+ 0"
8	Anna van der Breggen (NED)	Boels–Dolmans	+ 0"
9	Amy Pieters (NED)	Boels–Dolmans	+ 0"
10	Chantal Blaak (NED)	Boels–Dolmans	+ 0"

General classification after Stage 3a
Rank	Rider	Team	Time
1	Amy Pieters (NED)	Boels–Dolmans	5h 05' 38"
2	Anna van der Breggen (NED)	Boels–Dolmans	+ 27"
3	Chantal Blaak (NED)	Boels–Dolmans	+ 32"
4	Kirsten Wild (NED)	Wiggle High5	+ 40"
5	Lisa Klein (GER)	Canyon//SRAM	+ 44"
6	Christine Majerus (LUX)	Boels–Dolmans	+ 54"
7	Lisa Brennauer (GER)	Wiggle High5	+ 55"
8	Trixi Worrack (GER)	Canyon//SRAM	+ 1' 02"
9	Anouska Koster (NED)	WaowDeals Pro Cycling	+ 1' 06"
10	Natalie van Gogh (NED)	Parkhotel Valkenburg	+ 1' 07"

=== Stage 3b ===
6 April 2018 — Stadskanaal to Stadskanaal, 17.5 km (10.9 mi), team time trial (TTT)

Result of Stage 3b
Rank	Team	Time
1	Boels–Dolmans	21' 54"
2	Team Virtu Cycling	+ 52"
3	Canyon//SRAM	+ 1' 01"
4	Wiggle High5	+ 1' 02"
5	Parkhotel Valkenburg	+ 1' 05"
6	WaowDeals Pro Cycling	+ 1' 07"
7	Netherlands (national team)	+ 1' 12"
8	Hitec Products–Birk Sport	+ 1' 49"
9	Swaboladies.nl	+ 2' 09"
10	Denmark (national team)	+ 2' 19"

General classification after Stage 3b
Rank	Rider	Team	Time
1	Amy Pieters (NED)	Boels–Dolmans	5h 27' 32"
2	Anna van der Breggen (NED)	Boels–Dolmans	+ 27"
3	Chantal Blaak (NED)	Boels–Dolmans	+ 32"
4	Christine Majerus (LUX)	Boels–Dolmans	+ 54"
5	Kirsten Wild (NED)	Wiggle High5	+ 1' 42"
6	Lisa Klein (GER)	Canyon//SRAM	+ 1' 45"
7	Lisa Brennauer (GER)	Wiggle High5	+ 1' 57"
8	Trixi Worrack (GER)	Canyon//SRAM	+ 2' 03"
9	Alice Barnes (GBR)	Canyon//SRAM	+ 2' 09"
10	Natalie van Gogh (NED)	Parkhotel Valkenburg	+ 2' 12"

=== Stage 4 ===
7 April 2018 — Hogeland to Winsum, 142.9 km (88.8 mi)

Result of Stage 4
Rank	Rider	Team	Time
1	Chantal Blaak (NED)	Boels–Dolmans	3h 28' 11"
2	Kirsten Wild (NED)	Wiggle High5	+ 0"
3	Monique van de Ree (NED)	WaowDeals Pro Cycling	+ 0"
4	Amy Pieters (NED)	Boels–Dolmans	+ 0"
5	Mieke Kröger (GER)	Team Virtu Cycling	+ 8"
6	Anna van der Breggen (NED)	Boels–Dolmans	+ 15"
7	Christine Majerus (LUX)	Boels–Dolmans	+ 16"
8	Barbara Guarischi (ITA)	Team Virtu Cycling	+ 16"
9	Lisa Klein (GER)	Canyon//SRAM	+ 16"
10	Riejanne Markus (NED)	WaowDeals Pro Cycling	+ 23"

General classification after Stage 4
Rank	Rider	Team	Time
1	Amy Pieters (NED)	Boels–Dolmans	8h 55' 43"
2	Chantal Blaak (NED)	Boels–Dolmans	+ 22"
3	Anna van der Breggen (NED)	Boels–Dolmans	+ 42"
4	Christine Majerus (LUX)	Boels–Dolmans	+ 1' 10"
5	Kirsten Wild (NED)	Wiggle High5	+ 1' 36"
6	Lisa Klein (GER)	Canyon//SRAM	+ 2' 01"
7	Trixi Worrack (GER)	Canyon//SRAM	+ 2' 35"
8	Natalie van Gogh (NED)	Parkhotel Valkenburg	+ 2' 48"
9	Riejanne Markus (NED)	WaowDeals Pro Cycling	+ 3' 13"
10	Lisa Brennauer (GER)	Wiggle High5	+ 5' 08"

=== Stage 5 ===
8 April 2018 — Groningen to Groningen, 94.3 km (58.6 mi)

Result of Stage 5
Rank	Rider	Team	Time
1	Aafke Soet (NED)	WNT–Rotor Pro Cycling	2h 23' 58"
2	Mieke Kröger (GER)	Team Virtu Cycling	+ 7"
3	Christine Majerus (LUX)	Boels–Dolmans	+ 7"
4	Jeanne Korevaar (NED)	WaowDeals Pro Cycling	+ 7"
5	Lisa Brennauer (GER)	Wiggle High5	+ 7"
6	Natalie van Gogh (NED)	Parkhotel Valkenburg	+ 10"
7	Trixi Worrack (GER)	Canyon//SRAM	+ 11"
8	Tatiana Guderzo (ITA)	Hitec Products–Birk Sport	+ 11"
9	Winanda Spoor (NED)	Midden–Jan van Arckel	+ 11"
10	Karlijn Swinkels (NED)	Netherlands (national team)	+ 20"

Final general classification
Rank	Rider	Team	Time
1	Amy Pieters (NED)	Boels–Dolmans	11h 20' 09"
2	Chantal Blaak (NED)	Boels–Dolmans	+ 22"
3	Christine Majerus (LUX)	Boels–Dolmans	+ 42"
4	Anna van der Breggen (NED)	Boels–Dolmans	+ 42"
5	Kirsten Wild (NED)	Wiggle High5	+ 1' 36"
6	Lisa Klein (GER)	Canyon//SRAM	+ 2' 01"
7	Trixi Worrack (GER)	Canyon//SRAM	+ 2' 18"
8	Natalie van Gogh (NED)	Parkhotel Valkenburg	+ 2' 30"
9	Riejanne Markus (NED)	WaowDeals Pro Cycling	+ 3' 13"
10	Lisa Brennauer (GER)	Wiggle High5	+ 4' 44"

== Classification leadership table ==
In the 2018 Healthy Ageing Tour, six different jerseys were awarded. For the general classification, calculated by adding each cyclist's finishing times on each stage, and allowing time bonuses for the first three finishers at intermediate sprints and at the finish of mass-start stages, the leader received a yellow jersey. This classification was considered the most important of the 2018 Healthy Ageing Tour, and the winner of the classification was considered the winner of the race.

Additionally, there was a points classification, which awarded a green jersey. In the points classification, cyclists received points for finishing in the top 15 in a stage. For winning a stage, a rider earned 25 points, with 20 for second, 16 for third, 14 for fourth, 12 for fifth, 10 for sixth with a point fewer per place down to a single point for 15th place. The third classification was the sprints classification, the leader of which was awarded an orange jersey. In the sprints classification, riders received points for finishing in the top three at intermediate sprint points during each stage.

The fourth jersey represented the young rider classification, marked by a white jersey. This was decided in the same way as the general classification, but only riders born after 1 January 1996 were eligible to be ranked in the classification. Other jerseys were awarded to the best club rider amongst the amateur riders (blue), and for the most courageous rider showing fighting spirit (red). There was also a classification for teams, in which the times of the best three cyclists per team on each stage were added together; the leading team at the end of the race was the team with the lowest total time.

Stage	Winner	General classification	Points classification	Sprints classification	Young rider classification	Combativity classification	Club rider classification	Team classification
1	Anna van der Breggen	Anna van der Breggen	Anna van der Breggen	Not awarded (Note: Jersey worn by Lisa Brennauer in the second stage, but no points were awarded in the individual time trial.)	Lisa Klein	Kirsten Wild	Amber van der Hulst	Boels–Dolmans
2	Amy Pieters	Amy Pieters	Anna van der Breggen	Natalie van Gogh	Lisa Klein	Alice Barnes	Loes Adegeest	Boels–Dolmans
3a	Kirsten Wild	Amy Pieters	Kirsten Wild	Danique Braam	Lisa Klein	Mieke Kröger	Loes Adegeest	Boels–Dolmans
3b	Boels–Dolmans	Amy Pieters	Kirsten Wild	Danique Braam	Lisa Klein	Mieke Kröger	Loes Adegeest	Boels–Dolmans
4	Chantal Blaak	Amy Pieters	Kirsten Wild	Natalie van Gogh	Lisa Klein	Emilie Moberg	Loes Adegeest	Boels–Dolmans
5	Aafke Soet	Amy Pieters	Kirsten Wild	Natalie van Gogh	Lisa Klein	Winanda Spoor	Femke Markus	Boels–Dolmans
Final		Amy Pieters	Kirsten Wild	Natalie van Gogh	Lisa Klein	No final award	Femke Markus	Boels–Dolmans

== See also ==
- 2018 in women's road cycling
