= Jip van den Bos =

Dutch cyclist (born 1996)

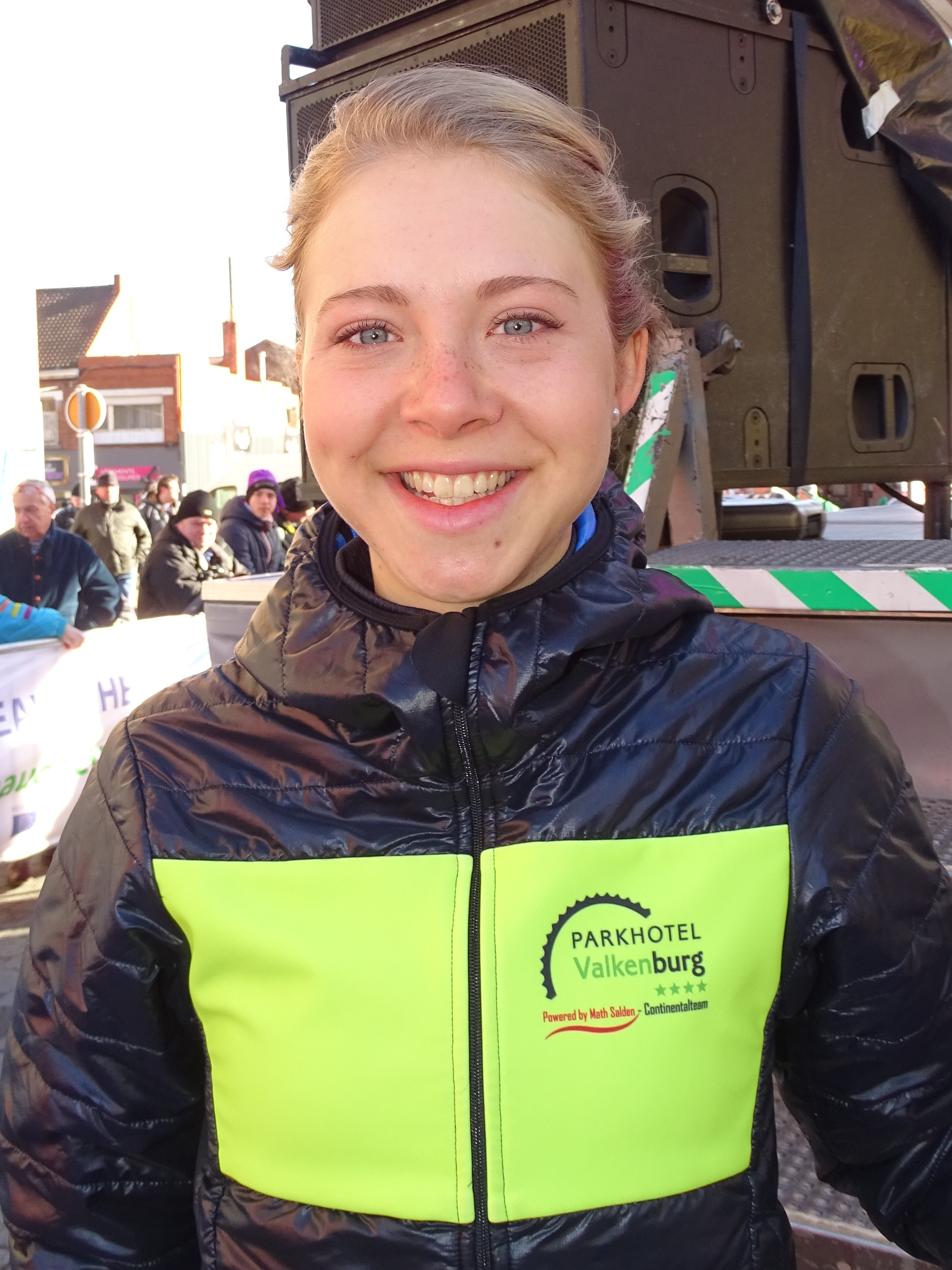
- Van den Bos at the 2016 Le Samyn des Dames

Personal information
- Full name: Jip van den Bos
- Born: 12 April 1996 (age 30) Oostknollendam, Netherlands

Cycling career
- Sport: Cycling
- Current team: Visma–Lease a Bike
- Discipline: Road
- Role: Rider

Professional teams
- 2015–2016: Parkhotel Valkenburg Continental Team
- 2017–2020: Boels–Dolmans
- 2021–2022: Team Jumbo–Visma

Jip van den Bos (born 12 April 1996) is a retired Dutch professional racing cyclist, who most recently rode for UCI Women's Continental Team Visma–Lease a Bike.

== Major results ==
2014
4th Road race, UEC European Junior Road Championships
2015
7th Ronde van Gelderland
8th Omloop van de IJsseldelta
2016
1st Young rider classification Emakumeen Euskal Bira
6th Overall Tour of Chongming Island

1st Young rider classification

8th Omloop van het Hageland
2017
4th Omloop van Borsele
2018
2nd 7-Dorpenomloop Aalburg
2019
1st Le Samyn des Dames
3rd Omloop Het Nieuwsblad
10th Ronde van Drenthe
2020
4th Le Samyn des Dames
9th Omloop Het Nieuwsblad
2021
5th Dwars door de Westhoek
2022
9th Ronde van Drenthe
10th Veenendaal–Veenendaal Classic

== See also ==
- 2015 Parkhotel Valkenburg Continental Team season
