= Natalie van Gogh =

Dutch cyclist

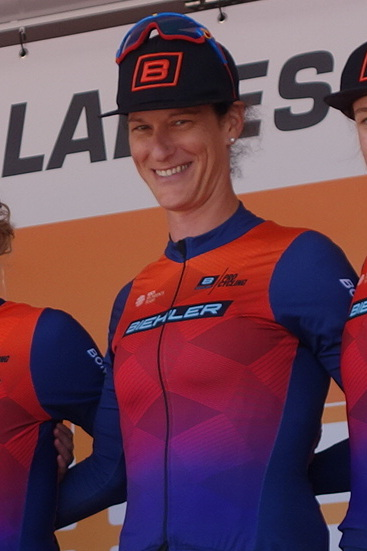
- Van Gogh at the 2019 Holland Ladies Tour

Personal information
- Full name: Natalie van Gogh
- Born: 14 September 1974 (age 52) Nieuw-Vennep, Netherlands

Cycling career
- Sport: Cycling
- Current team: Retired
- Discipline: Road
- Role: Rider

Amateur teams
- 2008–2010: Swabo Ladies
- 2011: Specialized DPD Women Cycling Team

Professional teams
- 2012: Team Ibis Cycles
- 2014–2018: Parkhotel Valkenburg Continental Team
- 2019: Biehler Pro Cycling
- 2020–2021: Chevalmeire Cycling Team

Natalie van Gogh (born 14 September 1974) is a Dutch former professional racing cyclist, who rode professionally between 2012 and 2021 for Team Ibis Cycles, Parkhotel Valkenburg, Biehler Pro Cycling and Bingoal Casino–Chevalmeire.

== Life and career ==
Van Gogh was assigned male at birth and later underwent sex reassignment surgery in 2005.

== Major results ==
2009
6th GP Sankomij Veldhoven
2010
8th Ronde van Gelderland
2014
5th Ronde van Overijssel
2015
1st Trofee Maarten Wynants
1st Stage 1 Belgium Tour
2nd Ronde van Overijssel
3rd Parel van de Veluwe
7th Gent–Wevelgem
7th Marianne Vos Classic
10th Overall BeNe Ladies Tour
2016
2nd Ronde van Gelderland
10th Overall BeNe Ladies Tour
2017
4th 7-Dorpenomloop Aalburg
9th Omloop van Borsele
2018
5th Le Samyn des Dames
8th Overall Healthy Ageing Tour

1st Sprints classification

2019
3rd Omloop van Borsele
10th Omloop van het Hageland

== See also ==
- 2014 Parkhotel Valkenburg Continental Team season
- 2015 Parkhotel Valkenburg Continental Team season
