= Omloop van de IJsseldelta =

Women's cycling race in the Netherlands

Salverda Omloop van de IJsseldelta
Race details
- Date: May
- Region: Netherlands
- Discipline: Road
- Type: One-day race

History
- First edition: 2009
- Editions: 11 (as of 2019)
- First winner: Noortje Tabak (NED)
- Most wins: Anna van der Breggen (NED) (3 wins)
- Most recent: Marta Tagliaferro (ITA)

The Salverda Omloop van de IJsseldelta is a women's one-day cycle race held in the Netherlands. It is rated by the Union Cycliste Internationale (UCI) as a category 1.2 race, having previously been a national-level event from 2009 to 2014.

== Winners ==
Year	Country	Rider	Team
2009	Netherlands	Noortje Tabak	DSB Bank - Nederland bloeit
2010	Netherlands	Kirsten Wild	Cervélo TestTeam
2011	Netherlands	Laura van der Kamp	Dolmans Landscaping Team
2012	Australia	Carla Ryan	AA Drink–leontien.nl
2013	Netherlands	Anna van der Breggen	Sengers Ladies Cycling Team
2014	Netherlands	Anna van der Breggen	Rabobank-Liv Woman Cycling Team
2015	Netherlands	Kirsten Wild	Team Hitec Products
2016	Netherlands	Anna van der Breggen	Rabobank-Liv Woman Cycling Team
2017	Netherlands	Nina Buijsman	Parkhotel Valkenburg–Destil
2018	Netherlands	Lorena Wiebes	Parkhotel Valkenburg
2019	Italy	Marta Tagliaferro	Hitec Products–Birk Sport
2020– 2021	No race due to the COVID-19 pandemic in the Netherlands		
2022	No race due to the death of race organiser, Jan Van Ommen		
