= VolkerWessels Women Cyclingteam =

Dutch cycling team

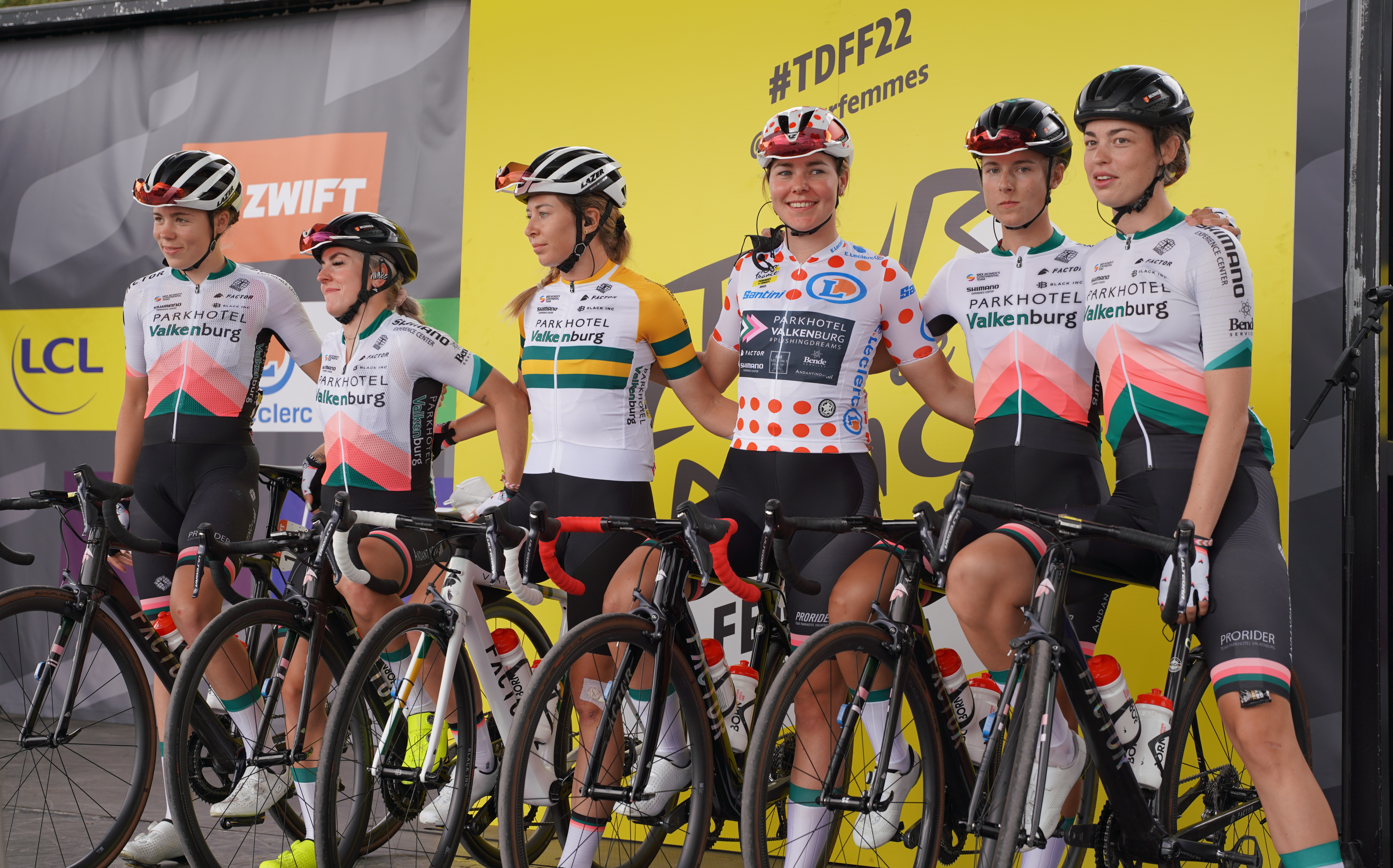
- Riders at the 2022 Tour de France Femmes

Team information
- UCI code: VWT
- Registered: Netherlands
- Founded: 2013
- Discipline: Road
- Status: UCI Women's Team (2014–2019); UCI Women's Continental Team (2020–2024); UCI Women's ProTeam (2025–)
- Bicycles: Factor
- Website: Team home page

Key personnel
- Team managers: Bart Faes; Jos Mooy; Raymond Rol

Team name history
- 2013 2014–2016 2017 2018–2023 2024–: Parkhotel Valkenburg Cycling Team; Parkhotel Valkenburg Continental Team; Parkhotel Valkenburg–Destil; Parkhotel Valkenburg; VolkerWessels Women Cyclingteam

VolkerWessels Women Cyclingteam (UCI team code: VWT) is a UCI Women's Continental Team based in the Netherlands, which competes in elite women's road bicycle races such as the UCI Women's World Tour. The team was established in 2013 and received an UCI licence in 2014.

The team is sponsored by Dutch construction company VolkerWessels.

== History ==
=== 2014 ===
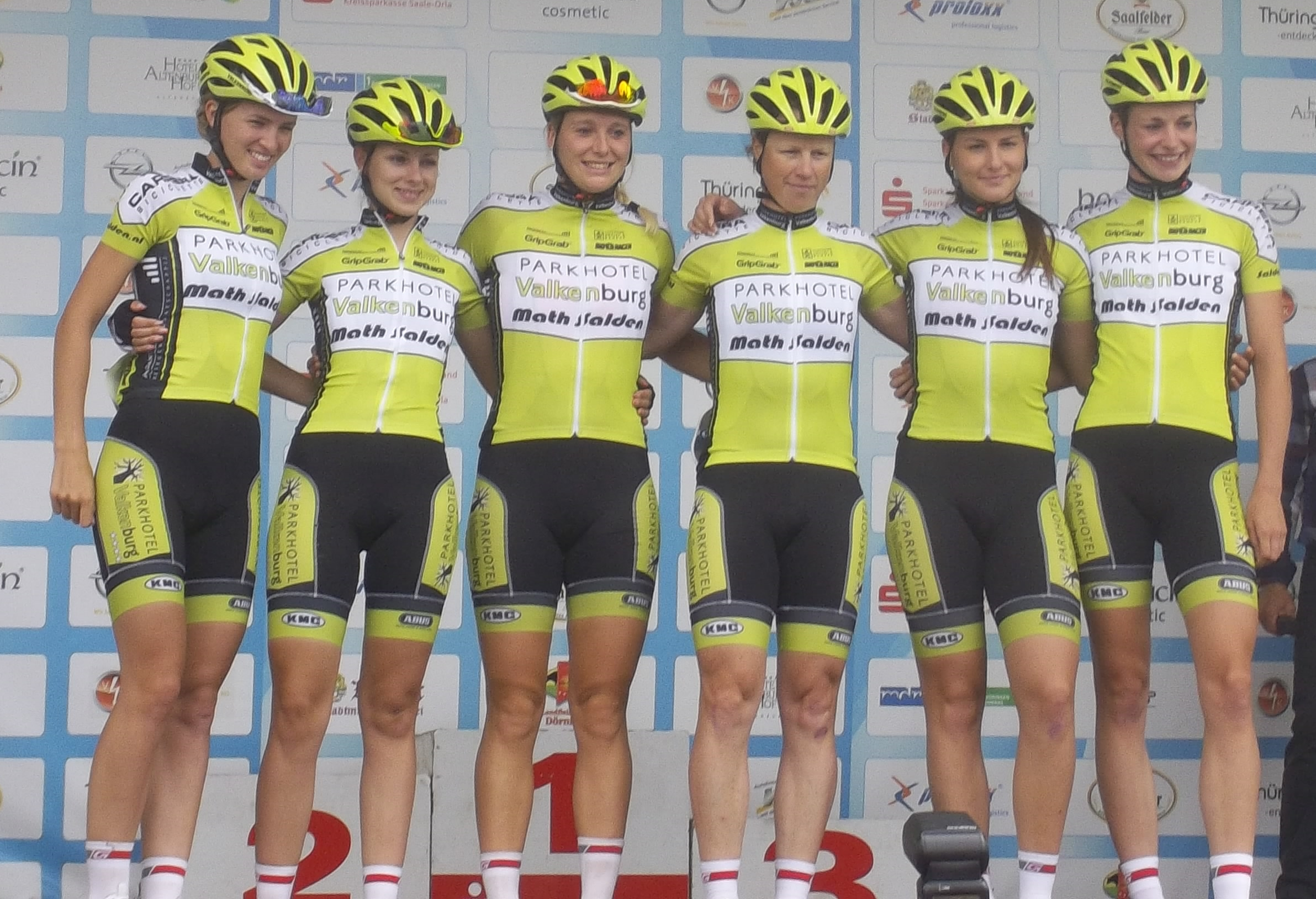
The team in 2014

The 2014 women's road cycling season was the first for the Parkhotel Valkenburg Continental Team as an UCI women's team.

=== 2015 ===
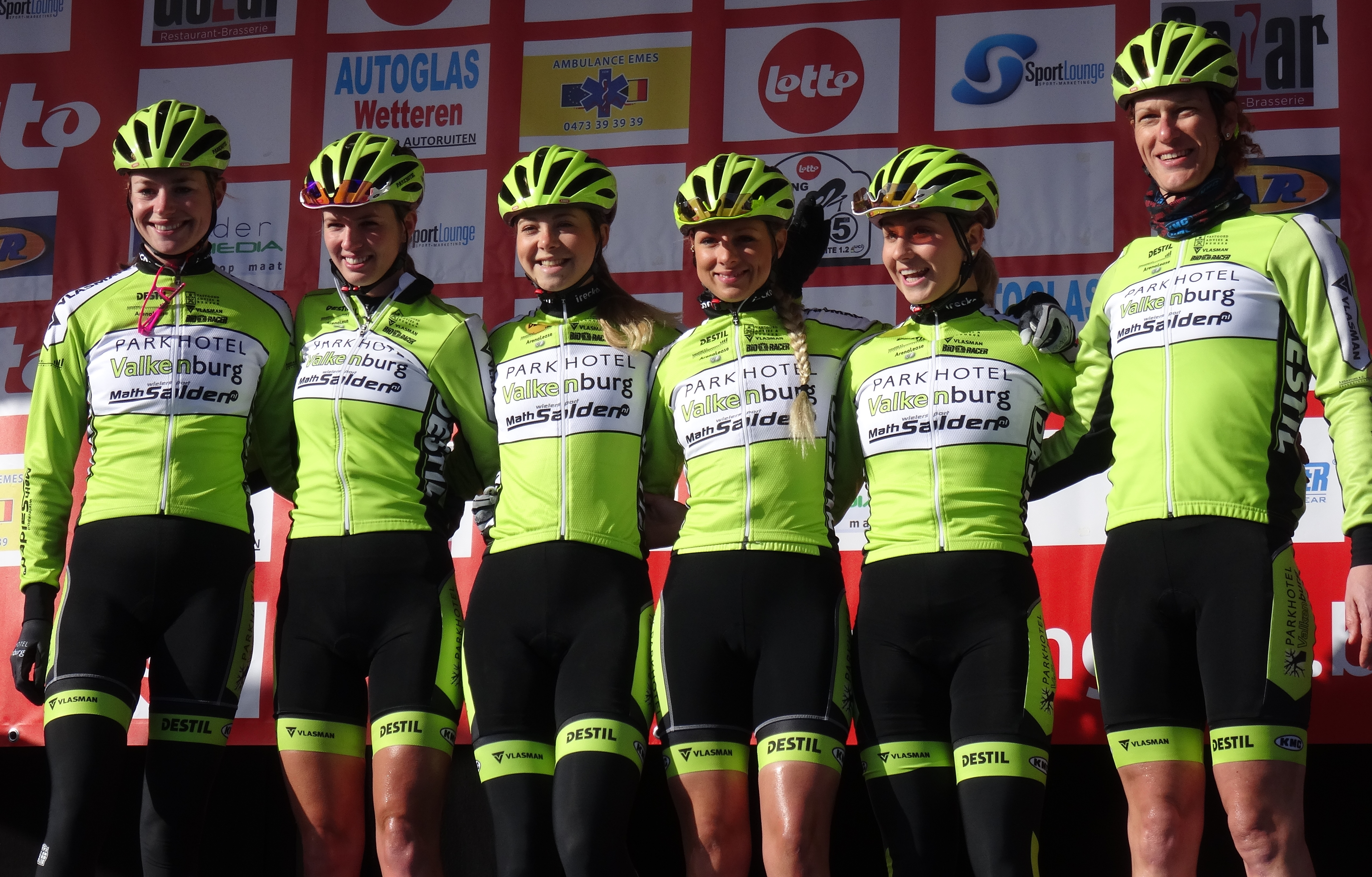
The team in 2015

=== 2018 ===
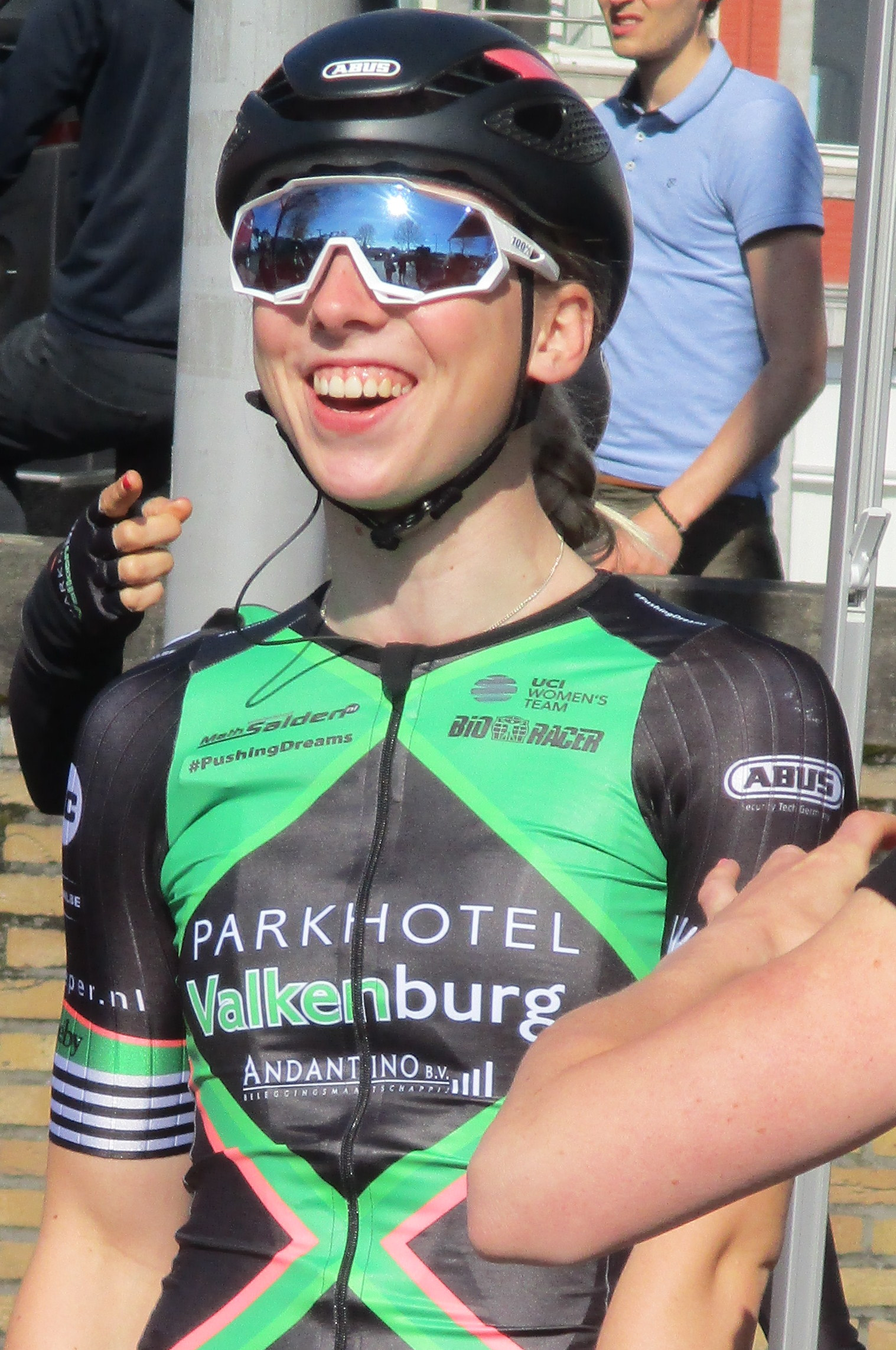
Lorena Wiebes in 2018

Former rider in the team Esra Tromp retired from racing to take on the role as team manager for Parkhotel Valkenburg in 2018 after sustaining multiple physical setbacks in 2017. Nancy van der Burg who had stepped up to UCI level in 2018 from club team Jos Feron Lady Force, but in May it was announced that she would be stepping back from racing with Parkhotel Valkenburg, as she was unable to balance racing professionally and working as a sport nutrition coach at LottoNL–Jumbo.

=== 2024 ===
The women's team will be taken over by and renamed to the VolkerWessels Cycling Team. The men's ABLOC cycling team will get its former name Parkhotel Valkenburg back. Both sponsors ABLOC and Parkhotel Valkenburg are owned by businessman Jos van de Mortel.

== Team roster ==
As of 15 August 2021.

Rider	Date of birth
Mischa Bredewold (NED)	20 June 2000 (age 26)
Nina Buijsman (NED)	16 November 1997 (age 28)
Belle de Gast (NED)	4 February 1991 (age 35)
Femke Gerritse (NED)	14 May 2001 (age 25)
Pien Limpens (NED)	24 February 2001 (age 25)
Femke Markus (NED)	17 November 1996 (age 29)
Rachel Neylan (AUS)	9 March 1982 (age 44)

Rider	Date of birth
Lieke Nooijen (NED)	20 July 2001 (age 25)
Marit Raaijmakers (NED)	2 June 1999 (age 27)
Sylvie Swinkels (NED)	31 July 2000 (age 26)
Julia van Bokhoven (NED)	1 April 2001 (age 25)
Amber van der Hulst (NED)	21 September 1999 (age 26)
Kirstie van Haaften (NED)	21 January 1999 (age 27)
Esther van Veen (NED)	27 September 1990 (age 35)

== Major wins ==
2015
Trofee Maarten Wynants, Natalie van Gogh
Stage 2 Auensteiner–Radsporttage, Rozanne Slik
Stage 1 Belgium Tour, Natalie van Gogh
2017
Omloop van de IJsseldelta, Nina Buijsman
Draai van de Kaai, Sophie de Boer
VR Women, Hanna Solovey
Tour Cycliste Féminin International de l'Ardèche

Stage 7, Pauliena Rooijakkers
Team classification

2018
Sprints classification Setmana Ciclista Valenciana, Belle de Gast
Volta Limburg Classic, Belle de Gast
Sprints classification Healthy Ageing Tour, Natalie van Gogh
7-Dorpenomloop Aalburg, Lorena Wiebes
Omloop van de IJsseldelta, Lorena Wiebes
Stage 2a BeNe Ladies Tour, Lorena Wiebes

2019
Nokere Koerse, Lorena Wiebes
Volta Limburg Classic, Demi Vollering
Brabantse Pijl, Sofie De Vuyst
Omloop van Borsele, Lorena Wiebes

Youth classification Healthy Ageing Tour, Lorena Wiebes

Overall Tour of Chongming Island, Lorena Wiebes

Points classification, Lorena Wiebes
Young rider classification, Lorena Wiebes
Stages 1, 2 & 3, Lorena Wiebes

Prologue Grand Prix Elsy Jacobs, Demi Vollering
Diamond Tour, Lorena Wiebes
European Games, Road Race, Lorena Wiebes
Stage 3 BeNe Ladies Tour, Lorena Wiebes
RideLondon Classique, Lorena Wiebes
Stage 1 Ladies Tour of Norway, Lorena Wiebes
Points classification Holland Ladies Tour, Lorena Wiebes

Young rider classification, Lorena Wiebes
Stages 1 & 2, Lorena Wiebes

Giro dell'Emilia Internazionale Donne Elite, Demi Vollering

2020
Omloop van het Hageland, Lorena Wiebes

2021
Stage 1 BeNe Ladies Tour, Mischa Bredewold

2022
Combativity classification Bloeizone Fryslân Tour, Mischa Bredewold
Leiedal Koerse, Femke Markus

== National champions ==
2016
Germany Track (Omnium), Anna Knauer

2019
Netherlands Road Race, Lorena Wiebes
