= UCI Cyclo-cross World Championships – Women's junior race =

UCI Cyclo-cross World Championships – Women's Juniors race
- Rainbow jersey

Race details
- Date: End of January, beginning of February
- Discipline: Cyclo-cross
- Type: One-day
- Organiser: UCI

History
- First edition: 2020
- Editions: 4 (as of 2024)
- First winner: Shirin van Anrooij (NED)
- Most wins: Shirin van Anrooij (NED); Zoe Backstedt (GBR); Isabella Holmgren (CAN); Célia Gery (FRA); Lise Revol (FRA); Barbora Bukovská (CZE) (1 win)
- Most recent: Barbora Bukovská (CZE)

The UCI Cyclo-cross World Championships – Women's Juniors Cyclo-cross is the annual world championship in the discipline of cyclo-cross for women in the Junior category, organised by the world governing body, the Union Cycliste Internationale. The event was first run in 2020. The winner has the right to wear the rainbow jersey for a full year when competing in Juniors cyclo-cross events.

== Palmares ==
Year	Gold	Silver	Bronze
2020	Shirin van Anrooij; Netherlands	Puck Pieterse; Netherlands	Madigan Munro; United States
2021	not held due to the COVID-19 pandemic		
2022	Zoe Bäckstedt; Great Britain	Leonie Bentveld; Netherlands	Lauren Molengraaf; Netherlands
2023	Isabella Holmgren; Canada	Ava Holmgren; Canada	Célia Gery; France
2024	Célia Gery; France	Cat Ferguson; Great Britain	Viktória Chladoňová; Slovakia
2025	Lise Revol; France	Barbora Bukovská; Czech Republic	Rafaelle Carrier; Canada
2026	Barbora Bukovská; Czech Republic	Lise Revol; France	Lucie Grohová; Czech Republic

== Medal count by country ==
Rank	Nation	Gold	Silver	Bronze	Total
1	France (FRA)	2	1	1	4
2	Netherlands (NED)	1	2	1	4
3	Canada (CAN)	1	1	1	3
3	Czech Republic (CZE)	1	1	1	3
5	Great Britain (GBR)	1	1	0	2
6	Slovakia (SVK)	0	0	1	1
6	United States (USA)	0	0	1	1
Totals (7 entries)		6	6	6	18
