= 2025 UEC Cyclo-cross European Championships =

Cyclo-cross championship

- Venue: Middelkerke, Belgium
- Date: 8–9 November 2025
- Events: 6

The 2025 UEC Cyclo-cross European Championships was the 23rd edition of UEC European Cyclo-cross Championships. It was the annual edition of the European championships in the cycling discipline of cyclo-cross and was organized by UEC on 8 and 9 November 2025 in the coastal town of Middelkerke, in Belgium.

Events were held for men and women, in junior, under-23 and elite classes. The mixed relay team event which was part of the 2023 and 2024 editions was not part of the competition in this year.

== Competition schedule ==
All times are local, CET (UTC+1).

| Date | Time | Race Category |
|---|---|---|
| 8 November 2025 | 11:00 | Women's junior race |
| 8 November 2025 | 13:00 | Men's under-23 race |
| 8 November 2025 | 15:00 | Women's elite race |
| 9 November 2025 | 11:00 | Men's junior race |
| 9 November 2025 | 13:00 | Women's under-23 race |
| 9 November 2025 | 15:00 | Men's elite race |

== Medal summary ==
| Event | Gold | | Silver | | Bronze | |
|---|---|---|---|---|---|---|
Women's events
| Women's elite race | Inge van der Heijden (NED) | 50:19 | Lucinda Brand (NED) | +0:41 | Aniek van Alphen (NED) | +0:56 |
| Women's under-23 race | Leonie Bentveld (NED) | 44:06 | Célia Gery (FRA) | +1:13 | Amandine Muller (FRA) | +1:49 |
| Women's junior race | Barbora Bukovská (CZE) | 37:30 | Nynke Jochems (NED) | +0:49 | Nicole Azzetti (ITA) | +0:52 |
Men's events
| Men's elite race | Toon Aerts (BEL) | 58:40 | Thibau Nys (BEL) | +0:00 | Joran Wyseure (BEL) | +0:03 |
| Men's under-23 race | Mattia Agostinacchio (ITA) | 53:15 | David Haverdings (NED) | +0:17 | Kay De Bruyckere (BEL) | +0:20 |
| Men's junior race | Filippo Grigolini (ITA) | 38:50 | Patrik Pezzo Rosola (ITA) | +0:13 | Giel Lejeune (BEL) | +0:16 |

== Results ==
=== Women ===
==== Elite ====
The Elite Women's race took place on Saturday November 8, 2025 in 6 laps over a total distance of 18.72 km. 23 riders from 11 nations took part in the race. These are the results of the top 15 riders.

Result
| Rank | Cyclist | Nation | Time | Diff. |
|---|---|---|---|---|
| | Inge van der Heijden | Netherlands | 50:19 | |
| 2nd place, silver medalist(s) | Lucinda Brand | Netherlands | 51:00 | +0:41 |
| 3rd place, bronze medalist(s) | Aniek van Alphen | Netherlands | 51:15 | +0:56 |
| 4 | Sara Casasola | Italy | 52:22 | +2:03 |
| 5 | Amandine Fouquenet | France | 52:33 | +2:14 |
| 6 | Hélène Clauzel | France | 52:54 | +2:35 |
| 7 | Denise Betsema | Netherlands | 53:03 | +2:44 |
| 8 | Laura Verdonschot | Belgium | 53:19 | +3:00 |
| 9 | Kristyna Zemanová | Czech Republic | 53:33 | +3:14 |
| 10 | Julie Brouwers | Belgium | 54:19 | +4:00 |
| 11 | Blanka Kata Vas | Hungary | 54:40 | +4:21 |
| 12 | Larissa Hartog | Netherlands | 55:05 | +4:46 |
| 13 | Marion Norbert-Riberolle | Belgium | 55:09 | +4:50 |
| 14 | Carlotta Borello | Italy | 55:54 | +5:35 |
| 15 | Rebekka Estermann | Switzerland | 56:28 | +6:09 |

==== Under-23 ====
The Under-23 Women's race took place on Sunday September 2025 in 5 laps over a total distance of 15.62 km. 22 riders from 12 nations took part in the race. These are the results of the top 15 riders.

Result
| Rank | Cyclist | Nation | Time | Diff. |
|---|---|---|---|---|
| | Leonie Bentveld | Netherlands | 44:06 | |
| 2nd place, silver medalist(s) | Célia Gery | France | 45:19 | +1:13 |
| 3rd place, bronze medalist(s) | Amandine Muller | France | 45:55 | +1:49 |
| 4 | Shanyl De Schoesitter | Belgium | 46:31 | +2:25 |
| 5 | Bloeme Kalis | Netherlands | 46:48 | +2:42 |
| 6 | Katerina Hladiková | Czech Republic | 47:24 | +3:18 |
| 7 | Elisa Ferri | Italy | 47:24 | +3:18 |
| 8 | Lauren Molengraaf | Netherlands | 47:25 | +3:19 |
| 9 | Amálie Gottwaldová | Czech Republic | 47:28 | +3:22 |
| 10 | Jana Glaus | Switzerland | 47:30 | +3:24 |
| 11 | Kacey Eyeington | Great Britain | 47:42 | +3:36 |
| 12 | Elena Day | Great Britain | 47:47 | +3:41 |
| 13 | Kateřina Douděrová | Czech Republic | 48:21 | +4:15 |
| 14 | Ilken Seynave | Belgium | 48:41 | +4:35 |
| 15 | Puck Langenbarg | Netherlands | 48:54 | +4:48 |

==== Junior ====
The Junior Women's race took place on Saturday November 8, 2025 in 4 laps over a total distance of 12.52 km. 41 riders from 17 nations took part in the race. These are the results of the top 15 riders.

Result
| Rank | Cyclist | Nation | Time | Diff. |
|---|---|---|---|---|
| | Barbora Bukovská | Czech Republic | 37:30 | |
| 2nd place, silver medalist(s) | Nynke Jochems | Netherlands | 38:19 | +0:49 |
| 3rd place, bronze medalist(s) | Nicole Azzetti | Italy | 38:22 | +0:52 |
| 4 | Laly Pichon | France | 38:42 | +1:12 |
| 5 | Shana Huber | Switzerland | 38:48 | +1:18 |
| 6 | Barbora Sislová | Czech Republic | 38:52 | +1:22 |
| 7 | Lucie Elizalde | France | 38:59 | +1:29 |
| 8 | Isis Versluis | Netherlands | 39:07 | +1:37 |
| 9 | Eva Drhová | Czech Republic | 39:08 | +1:38 |
| 10 | Peggy Knox | Great Britain | 39:16 | +1:46 |
| 11 | Rianne Nieuwenhuis | Netherlands | 39:21 | +1:51 |
| 12 | Lujza Bartošíková | Slovakia | 39:21 | +1:51 |
| 13 | Elisa Bianchi | Italy | 39:45 | +2:15 |
| 14 | Lucie Grohová | Czech Republic | 39:48 | +2:18 |
| 15 | Zita Peeters | Belgium | 39:52 | +2:22 |

=== Men ===
==== Elite ====
The Elite Men's race took place on Sunday November 9, 2025 in 8 laps over a total distance of 24.92 km. 27 riders from 12 nations took part in the race. These are the results of the top 15 riders.

Result
| Rank | Cyclist | Nation | Time | Diff. |
|---|---|---|---|---|
| | Toon Aerts | Belgium | 58:40 | |
| 2nd place, silver medalist(s) | Thibau Nys | Belgium | 58:40 | +0:00 |
| 3rd place, bronze medalist(s) | Joran Wyseure | Belgium | 58:43 | +0:03 |
| 4 | Pim Ronhaar | Netherlands | 58:44 | +0:04 |
| 5 | Cameron Mason | Great Britain | 58:44 | +0:04 |
| 6 | Emiel Verstrynge | Belgium | 58:52 | +0:12 |
| 7 | Mees Hendrikx | Netherlands | 59:05 | +0:25 |
| 8 | Jente Michels | Belgium | 59:13 | +0:33 |
| 9 | Felipe Orts Lloret | Spain | 59:17 | +0:37 |
| 10 | Michael Vanthourenhout | Belgium | 59:22 | +0:42 |
| 11 | Laurens Sweeck | Belgium | 59:27 | +0:47 |
| 12 | Lars van der Haar | Netherlands | 59:38 | +0:58 |
| 13 | Filippo Fontana | Italy | 59:58 | +1:18 |
| 14 | Michael Boros | Czech Republic | 1:00:17 | +1:37 |
| 15 | Joris Nieuwenhuis | Netherlands | 1:00:30 | +1:50 |

==== Under-23 ====
The Under-23 Men's race took place on Saturday November 8, 2025 in 7 laps over a total distance of 21.82 km. 42 riders from 15 nations took part in the race. These are the results of the top 15 riders.

Result
| Rank | Cyclist | Nation | Time | Diff. |
|---|---|---|---|---|
| | Mattia Agostinacchio | Italy | 53:15 | |
| 2nd place, silver medalist(s) | David Haverdings | Netherlands | 53:32 | +0:17 |
| 3rd place, bronze medalist(s) | Kay De Bruyckere | Belgium | 53:35 | +0:20 |
| 4 | Romain Debord | France | 53:35 | +0:20 |
| 5 | Václav Ježek | Czech Republic | 53:38 | +0:23 |
| 6 | Aubin Sparfel | France | 53:40 | +0:25 |
| 7 | Viktor Vandenberghe | Belgium | 53:42 | +0:27 |
| 8 | Guus van den Eijnden | Netherlands | 53:44 | +0:29 |
| 9 | Alexis David | France | 53:47 | +0:32 |
| 10 | Sil De Brauwere | Belgium | 53:56 | +0:41 |
| 11 | Raul Mira Bonastre | Spain | 54:06 | +0:51 |
| 12 | Stefano Viezzi | Italy | 54:19 | +1:04 |
| 13 | Kenay De Moyer | Belgium | 54:42 | +1:27 |
| 14 | Arthur van den Boer | Belgium | 54:53 | +1:38 |
| 15 | Yordi Corsus | Belgium | 54:59 | +1:44 |

==== Junior ====
The Junior Men's race took place on Sunday November 9, 2025 in 5 laps over a total distance of 15.62 km. 64 riders from 21 nations took part in the race. These are the results of the top 15 riders.

Result
| Rank | Cyclist | Nation | Time | Diff. |
|---|---|---|---|---|
| | Filippo Grigolini | Italy | 38:50 | |
| 2nd place, silver medalist(s) | Patrik Pezzo Rosola | Italy | 39:03 | +0:13 |
| 3rd place, bronze medalist(s) | Giel Lejeune | Belgium | 39:06 | +0:16 |
| 4 | Cas Timmermans | Netherlands | 39:17 | +0:27 |
| 5 | Delano Heeren | Netherlands | 39:39 | +0:49 |
| 6 | Michael Hettegger | Austria | 40:12 | +1:22 |
| 7 | Noël Goijert | Netherlands | 40:20 | +1:30 |
| 8 | Jari Van Lee | Belgium | 40:30 | +1:40 |
| 9 | Kai Van Hoof | Netherlands | 40:40 | +1:50 |
| 10 | Victor Devos | France | 40:50 | +2:00 |
| 11 | Loek Hovers | Netherlands | 40:54 | +2:04 |
| 12 | Jop van den Biggelaar | Netherlands | 41:02 | +2:12 |
| 13 | Arthur Janssens | Belgium | 41:05 | +2:15 |
| 14 | Soen Le Pann | France | 41:06 | +2:16 |
| 15 | Soren Bruyère Joumard | France | 41:07 | +2:17 |

== Medals table ==
* Host nation (Belgium)

| Rank | Nation | Gold | Silver | Bronze | Total |
|---|---|---|---|---|---|
| 1 | Netherlands (NED) | 2 | 3 | 1 | 6 |
| 2 | Italy (ITA) | 2 | 1 | 1 | 4 |
| 3 | Belgium (BEL)* | 1 | 1 | 3 | 5 |
| 4 | Czech Republic (CZE) | 1 | 0 | 0 | 1 |
| 5 | France (FRA) | 0 | 1 | 1 | 2 |
| Totals (5 entries) | | 6 | 6 | 6 | 18 |
