= 2025–26 UCI Cyclo-cross World Cup =

Bicycle racing competition

- Thirty-third edition of the UCI Cyclo-cross World Cup

Details
- Dates: 23 November 2025 – 25 January 2026
- Location: Czech Republic; France; Italy; Belgium; Spain; Netherlands
- Races: 12

Champions
- Male individual champion: Mathieu van der Poel (NED) Elite; David Haverdings (NED) U-23; Patrik Pezzo Rosola (ITA) Junior
- Female individual champion: Lucinda Brand (NED) Elite; Leonie Bentveld (NED) U-23; Lise Revol (FRA) Junior

Location of the blue elite races, red all category crosses. (Enlarge and zoom map to spot all locations.)

The 2025–26 UCI Cyclo-cross World Cup was the 33rd edition of UCI Cyclo-cross World Cup. It is a season-long cyclo-cross competition, organized by the Union Cycliste Internationale (UCI) and Flanders Classics, that took place between 23 November 2025 and 25 January 2026.

The defending champions in the Elite category were Michael Vanthourenhout in the men's competition and Lucinda Brand in the women's competition.

== Points distribution ==
Points were awarded to all eligible riders at each race. The top 25 riders receive points.

- For the top ten finishers the points were allocated according the following table:

Points awarded
| Position | 1 | 2 | 3 | 4 | 5 | 6 | 7 | 8 | 9 | 10 |
| Elite riders | 40 | 30 | 25 | 22 | 21 | 20 | 19 | 18 | 17 | 16 |

- Riders finishing in positions 11 to 25 also received points, going down from 15 points for 11th place by one point per place to 1 point for 25th place.
- Note that the points given here are entirely different from the UCI ranking points, which are distributed according to a different scale and determine starting order in races, but have no impact on World Cup standings.

== Race categories ==
There were races in 5 categories Elite Men, Elite Women, Under-23 Men, Junior Men and Junior Women. There was no separate race for Under-23 Women but the riders in this category took part in the Elite Women race. There were separate classification in all 6 above categories.

== Calendar ==
In total there were 12 World Cup events held during the season. All events included Elite Women and Elite Men races, but only 6 of the 12 events included an Under-23 or Junior race.

Compared to the previous edition the races in Dublin, Besançon and Hulst (site of 2026 UCI Cyclo-cross World Championships) were removed and replaced by the races in Tábor, Flamanville and Koksijde. Also the race in Cabras which was cancelled in 2025 due to the bad weather was replaced by a new race in Terralba in the same region.

| # | Date | Race | Location | Categories |
|---|---|---|---|---|
| 1 | 23 November 2025 | Cyklokros Tábor | (Czech Republic) Tábor | All |
| 2 | 30 November 2025 | Cyclo-cross Flamanville | (France) Flamanville | All |
| 3 | 7 December 2025 | Cyclo-cross Terralba-Sardinia | (Italy) Terralba | Elite |
| 4 | 14 December 2025 | Citadelcross Namur | (Belgium) Namur | Elite |
| 5 | 20 December 2025 | Scheldecross Antwerpen | (Belgium) Antwerp | Elite |
| 6 | 21 December 2025 | Duinencross Koksijde | (Belgium) Koksijde | All |
| 7 | 26 December 2025 | Cyclo-cross Gavere | (Belgium) Gavere | Elite |
| 8 | 28 December 2025 | Ambiancecross | (Belgium) Dendermonde | All |
| 9 | 4 January 2026 | Cyclo-cross Zonhoven | (Belgium) Zonhoven | Elite |
| 10 | 18 January 2026 | Cyclo-cross Benidorm | (Spain) Benidorm | All |
| 11 | 24 January 2026 | Cyclo-cross Maasmechelen | (Belgium) Maasmechelen | Elite |
| 12 | 25 January 2026 | Grand Prix Adrie van der Poel | (Netherlands) Hoogerheide | All |

== Results ==
=== Elite Women ===
==== Race results ====
| Date | Race | Distance | Winner | Second | Third | Competition leader |
|---|---|---|---|---|---|---|
| 23 November | (Czech Republic) Tábor | 16.66 km | Lucinda Brand (NED) | Sara Casasola (ITA) | Inge van der Heijden (NED) | Lucinda Brand (NED) |
| 30 November | (France) Flamanville | 17.45 km | Aniek van Alphen (NED) | Amandine Fouquenet (FRA) | Ceylin del Carmen Alvarado (NED) | Aniek van Alphen (NED) |
| 7 December | (Italy) Terralba | 18.97 km | Lucinda Brand (NED) | Aniek van Alphen (NED) | Shirin van Anrooij (NED) | Aniek van Alphen (NED) |
| 14 December | (Belgium) Namur | 17.30 km | Lucinda Brand (NED) | Aniek van Alphen (NED) | Amandine Fouquenet (FRA) | Aniek van Alphen (NED) |
| 20 December | (Belgium) Antwerp | 19.87 km | Lucinda Brand (NED) | Ceylin del Carmen Alvarado (NED) | Aniek van Alphen (NED) | Lucinda Brand (NED) |
| 21 December | (Belgium) Koksijde | 17.25 km | Lucinda Brand (NED) | Shirin van Anrooij (NED) | Ceylin del Carmen Alvarado (NED) | Lucinda Brand (NED) |
| 26 December | (Belgium) Gavere | 16.90 km | Lucinda Brand (NED) | Amandine Fouquenet (FRA) | Puck Pieterse (NED) | Lucinda Brand (NED) |
| 28 December | (Belgium) Dendermonde | 22.59 km | Lucinda Brand (NED) | Puck Pieterse (NED) | Amandine Fouquenet (FRA) | Lucinda Brand (NED) |
| 4 January | (Belgium) Zonhoven | 19.27 km | Ceylin del Carmen Alvarado (NED) | Lucinda Brand (NED) | Puck Pieterse (NED) | Lucinda Brand (NED) |
| 18 January | (Spain) Benidorm | 19.98 km | Lucinda Brand (NED) | Ceylin del Carmen Alvarado (NED) | Amandine Fouquenet (FRA) | Lucinda Brand (NED) |
| 24 January | (Belgium) Maasmechelen | 19.05 km | Puck Pieterse (NED) | Ceylin del Carmen Alvarado (NED) | Amandine Fouquenet (FRA) | Lucinda Brand (NED) |
| 25 January | (Netherlands) Hoogerheide | 21.83 km | Puck Pieterse (NED) | Kristyna Zemanová (CZE) | Amandine Fouquenet (FRA) | Lucinda Brand (NED) |

=== Elite Men ===
==== Race results ====
| Date | Race | Distance | Winner | Second | Third | Competition leader |
|---|---|---|---|---|---|---|
| 23 November | (Czech Republic) Tábor | 26.56 km | Thibau Nys (BEL) | Laurens Sweeck (BEL) | Joris Nieuwenhuis (NED) | Thibau Nys (BEL) |
| 30 November | (France) Flamanville | 26.15 km | Thibau Nys (BEL) | Lars van der Haar (NED) | Cameron Mason (GBR) | Thibau Nys (BEL) |
| 7 December | (Italy) Terralba | 28.41 km | Michael Vanthourenhout (BEL) | Joris Nieuwenhuis (NED) | Laurens Sweeck (BEL) | Thibau Nys (BEL) |
| 14 December | (Belgium) Namur | 22.30 km | Mathieu van der Poel (NED) | Thibau Nys (BEL) | Michael Vanthourenhout (BEL) | Thibau Nys (BEL) |
| 20 December | (Belgium) Antwerp | 26.47 km | Mathieu van der Poel (NED) | Laurens Sweeck (BEL) | Emiel Verstrynge (BEL) | Laurens Sweeck (BEL) |
| 21 December | (Belgium) Koksijde | 24.05 km | Mathieu van der Poel (NED) | Laurens Sweeck (BEL) | Niels Vandeputte (BEL) | Laurens Sweeck (BEL) |
| 26 December | (Belgium) Gavere | 25.30 km | Mathieu van der Poel (NED) | Thibau Nys (BEL) | Tibor Del Grosso (NED) | Laurens Sweeck (BEL) |
| 28 December | (Belgium) Dendermonde | 30.09 km | Thibau Nys (BEL) | Tibor Del Grosso (NED) | Laurens Sweeck (BEL) | Laurens Sweeck (BEL) |
| 4 January | (Belgium) Zonhoven | 25.68 km | Mathieu van der Poel (NED) | Tibor Del Grosso (NED) | Emiel Verstrynge (BEL) | Mathieu van der Poel (NED) |
| 18 January | (Spain) Benidorm | 26.19 km | Mathieu van der Poel (NED) | Thibau Nys (BEL) | Felipe Orts (ESP) | Mathieu van der Poel (NED) |
| 24 January | (Belgium) Maasmechelen | 28.65 km | Mathieu van der Poel (NED) | Tibor Del Grosso (NED) | Niels Vandeputte (BEL) | Mathieu van der Poel (NED) |
| 25 January | (Netherlands) Hoogerheide | 28.03 km | Mathieu van der Poel (NED) | Tibor Del Grosso (NED) | Niels Vandeputte (BEL) | Mathieu van der Poel (NED) |

==== World Cup Standings ====
The final standings were calculated based on the standings in each race.

| Pos. | Rider | (Czech Republic) TAB | (France) FLA | (Italy) TER | (Belgium) NAM | (Belgium) ANT | (Belgium) KOK | (Belgium) GAV | (Belgium) DEN | (Belgium) ZON | (Spain) BEN | (Belgium) MAA | (Netherlands) HOO | Total Points |
|---|---|---|---|---|---|---|---|---|---|---|---|---|---|---|
| 1 | (Netherlands) Mathieu van der Poel | DNS | DNS | DNS | 1 | 1 | 1 | 1 | DNS | 1 | 1 | | | 240 |
| 2 | (Belgium) Thibau Nys | 1 | 1 | DNS | 2 | 23 | DNS | 2 | 1 | 19 | 2 | | | 220 |
| 3 | (Belgium) Niels Vandeputte | 10 | 4 | 5 | 6 | 5 | 3 | 18 | 5 | 4 | 5 | | | 197 |
| 4 | (Belgium) Michael Vanthourenhout | 17 | 7 | 1 | 3 | 8 | 9 | 6 | 7 | 6 | DNS | | | 187 |
| 5 | (Belgium) Laurens Sweeck | 2 | 5 | 3 | 16 | 2 | 2 | 11 | 3 | DNS | DNS | | | 186 |
| 6 | (Belgium) Emiel Verstrynge | 5 | 9 | DNS | 5 | 3 | 13 | 5 | 4 | 3 | DNS | | | 165 |
| 7 | (Netherlands) Tibor Del Grosso | DNS | DNS | DNS | 14 | 6 | 4 | 3 | 2 | 2 | 4 | | | 161 |
| 8 | (Belgium) Toon Aerts | 8 | 12 | DNS | 12 | 11 | 5 | 4 | 10 | 5 | 9 | | | 158 |
| 9 | (Netherlands) Mees Hendrikx | 16 | 11 | 9 | 21 | 9 | 10 | 8 | 9 | 10 | 6 | | | 151 |
| 10 | (Netherlands) Joris Nieuwenhuis | 3 | 6 | 2 | 8 | 16 | DNS | DNF | DNS | 7 | 7 | | | 141 |
| 11 | (Belgium) Joran Wyseure | 22 | 26 | 11 | 17 | 10 | 7 | 7 | 12 | 15 | 10 | | | 123 |
| 12 | (Netherlands) Lars van der Haar | 7 | 2 | DNS | 4 | DNF | 11 | 9 | 17 | 16 | DNS | | | 122 |
| 13 | (Netherlands) Ryan Kamp | 6 | 13 | 4 | 35 | 13 | 16 | DNF | 14 | 11 | 18 | | | 113 |
| 14 | (Belgium) Toon Vandebosch | 14 | 14 | 7 | 10 | 15 | 6 | 14 | 22 | 23 | DNS | | | 109 |
| 15 | (Spain) Felipe Orts | 15 | DNS | DNS | 15 | 12 | 21 | 29 | 8 | 8 | 3 | | | 102 |
| 16 | (Netherlands) Pim Ronhaar | 13 | 29 | 10 | 7 | 4 | 12 | 25 | 32 | 9 | 34 | | | 102 |
| 17 | (Belgium) Jente Michels | 4 | 8 | DNS | 11 | DNS | DNS | DNF | 11 | 14 | 13 | | | 95 |
| 18 | (United Kingdom) Cameron Mason | 9 | 3 | DNS | DNF | DNS | 8 | 10 | 20 | DNS | 35 | | | 82 |
| 19 | (Switzerland) Kevin Kuhn | 11 | 15 | DNS | 18 | DNF | 14 | DNF | 13 | 17 | 14 | | | 80 |
| 20 | (Belgium) Witse Meeussen | 19 | 17 | 12 | 9 | 14 | 15 | DNS | DNS | DNF | 19 | | | 77 |
| 21 | (Belgium) Victor Van de Putte | 23 | 10 | 6 | 19 | 18 | 18 | DNF | DNS | DNS | 17 | | | 71 |
| 22 | (Czech Republic) Michael Boroš | 18 | 19 | DNS | 30 | 20 | 20 | 17 | 37 | 12 | 12 | | | 64 |
| 23 | (Italy) Filippo Fontana | DNS | DNS | DNS | DNS | 17 | 17 | 12 | DNS | 13 | DNS | | | 45 |
| 24 | (France) Rémi Lelandais | 24 | 21 | DNS | 27 | 28 | DNS | 15 | 19 | 25 | 11 | | | 41 |
| 25 | (France) Martin Groslambert | DNS | 22 | DNS | 20 | 25 | 31 | DNS | 15 | DNS | 8 | | | 40 |
| 26 | (Belgium) Wout van Aert | DNS | DNS | DNS | DNS | 7 | DNS | DNS | 6 | DNS | DNS | | | 39 |
| 27 | (Italy) Filippo Agostinacchio | DNS | DNS | 8 | 29 | 19 | 24 | DNS | 31 | DNS | 15 | | | 38 |
| 28 | (France) Nathan Bommenel | 20 | 18 | DNS | 24 | 22 | 22 | 16 | 23 | 27 | 28 | | | 37 |
| 29 | (France) David Menut | DNS | 30 | DNS | 28 | DNS | 29 | 19 | 18 | 20 | 20 | | | 27 |
| 30 | (Belgium) Wout Janssen | DNS | DNS | 13 | DNS | DNS | DNS | 13 | DNS | DNS | DNS | | | 26 |
| 31 | (United States) Andrew Strohmeyer | 12 | 16 | DNS | 39 | 46 | 38 | DNF | DNS | DNS | 36 | | | 24 |
| 32 | (Italy) Gioele Bertolini | DNS | DNS | 16 | DNS | 35 | DNS | 27 | DNF | DNS | 16 | | | 20 |
| 33 | (Belgium) Gerben Kuypers | DNS | DNS | DNS | DNS | DNS | DNS | DNS | 16 | 18 | 31 | | | 18 |
| 34 | (Italy) Federico Ceolin | 32 | DNS | 14 | DNS | 48 | 33 | DNS | DNS | DNS | 21 | | | 17 |
| 35 | (United Kingdom) Thomas Mein | DNS | 20 | DNS | 26 | 21 | DNF | 23 | 30 | DNF | DNF | | | 14 |
| 36 | (Italy) Mattia Agostinacchio | DNS | DNS | DNS | 13 | DNS | DNS | DNS | DNS | DNS | DNS | | | 13 |
| 37 | (Belgium) Mats Vanden Eynde | DNS | DNS | 15 | DNS | DNS | DNS | DNS | DNS | DNS | DNS | | | 11 |
| 38 | (France) Théo Thomas | 33 | DNS | DNS | 23 | DNS | 19 | 37 | DNF | 34 | DNS | | | 10 |
| 39 | (Netherlands) Danny van Lierop | 21 | 33 | DNS | 22 | 30 | 27 | 28 | 25 | DNS | DNS | | | 10 |
| 40 | (Belgium) Yordi Corsus | DNS | DNS | 17 | DNS | DNS | DNS | DNS | DNS | DNS | DNS | | | 9 |
| 41 | (Netherlands) David Haverdings | DNS | DNS | 18 | DNF | DNS | DNS | DNS | DNS | DNS | DNS | | | 8 |
| 42 | (Italy) Tommaso Ferri | DNS | DNS | 19 | DNS | DNS | DNS | DNS | DNS | DNS | DNS | | | 7 |
| 43 | (Italy) Samuele Scappini | DNS | DNS | 21 | DNS | DNF | DNS | 24 | DNS | DNS | DNS | | | 7 |
| 44 | (Belgium) Sil De Brauwere | DNS | DNS | DNS | DNS | DNS | DNS | 20 | DNS | DNS | DNS | | | 6 |
| 45 | (France) Florian Gaillard | DNS | DNS | 20 | DNS | DNS | DNS | DNS | DNS | DNS | DNS | | | 6 |
| 46 | (France) Aubin Sparfel | DNS | DNS | DNS | DNS | DNS | DNS | DNS | DNS | 21 | DNS | | | 5 |
| 47 | (Spain) Gonzalo Inguanzo | DNS | DNS | DNS | DNS | 55 | 30 | 38 | 21 | DNS | DNS | | | 5 |
| 48 | (Belgium) Viktor Vandenberghe | DNS | DNS | DNS | DNS | DNS | DNS | 21 | DNS | DNS | DNS | | | 5 |
| 49 | (Switzerland) Loris Rouiller | DNF | 38 | DNS | DNF | DNS | DNS | DNS | DNS | DNS | 22 | | | 4 |
| 50 | (France) Léo Bisiaux | DNS | DNS | DNS | DNS | DNS | DNS | DNS | DNS | 22 | DNS | | | 4 |
| 51 | (France) Romain Debord | DNS | DNS | DNS | DNS | DNS | DNS | 22 | DNS | DNS | DNS | | | 4 |
| 52 | (Netherlands) Floris Haverdings | DNS | DNS | 22 | DNS | DNS | DNS | DNS | DNS | 40 | DNS | | | 4 |
| 53 | (France) Tristan Verrier | DNS | 25 | DNS | DNS | DNS | 23 | DNS | DNS | DNS | DNS | | | 4 |
| 54 | (Spain) Mario Junquera San Millán | DNS | 27 | DNS | 33 | 47 | 35 | 30 | 24 | 32 | 24 | | | 4 |
| 55 | (Denmark) Bailey Groenendaal | 25 | 24 | DNS | 34 | 34 | 25 | 31 | 27 | 35 | DNS | | | 4 |
| 56 | (United States) Eric Brunner | DNS | DNS | DNS | DNS | DNS | DNS | DNS | DNS | DNS | 23 | | | 3 |
| 57 | (France) Thomas Courcier | DNS | DNS | 23 | DNS | DNS | DNS | DNS | DNS | DNS | DNS | | | 3 |
| 58 | (Spain) Kevin Suárez Fernández | 36 | 23 | DNS | DNS | 27 | 26 | DNS | DNS | DNF | 26 | | | 3 |
| 59 | (Netherlands) Guus van den Eijnden | DNS | DNS | DNS | DNS | DNS | DNS | DNS | DNS | 24 | DNS | | | 2 |
| 60 | (Czech Republic) Václav Ježek | DNS | DNS | DNS | DNS | 24 | DNS | DNS | DNS | DNS | DNS | | | 2 |
| 61 | (Italy) Antonio Folcarelli | DNS | DNS | 24 | DNS | DNS | DNS | DNS | DNS | DNS | DNS | | | 2 |
| 62 | (France) Timothé Gabriel | DNS | 37 | DNS | DNS | DNS | 32 | DNS | 26 | DNS | 25 | | | 1 |
| 63 | (Belgium) Kay De Bruyckere | DNS | DNS | DNS | 25 | DNS | DNS | DNS | DNS | DNF | DNS | | | 1 |
| 64 | (Italy) Lorenzo De Longhi | DNS | DNS | 25 | DNS | 62 | DNS | 51 | DNS | DNS | DNS | | | 1 |

Key
| 1st Place | 2nd Place | 3rd Place | Other points position | Finished outside points | Did not finish | Did not start |

=== Under-23 Women ===
There was no separate race for Under-23 Women. The riders in this age category competed in the Elite Women race, and received World Cup points based on the standing in the combined Elite/Under-23 race. So for example finishing first among the Under-23 riders but fifth in the combined Elite/Under-23 classification would give not 40 but 20 points.

The leader of the classification wore a blue/white World Cup leader jersey, distinct from the Elite Women's red/white jersey.

==== Race results ====
| Date | Race | Distance | Winner | Second | Third | Competition leader |
|---|---|---|---|---|---|---|
| 23 November | (Czech Republic) Tábor | 16.66 km | Leonie Bentveld (NED) | Fleur Moors (BEL) | Viktória Chladoňová (SVK) | Leonie Bentveld (NED) |
| 30 November | (France) Flamanville | 17.45 km | Leonie Bentveld (NED) | Fleur Moors (BEL) | Célia Gery (FRA) | Leonie Bentveld (NED) |
| 7 December | (Italy) Terralba | 18.97 km | Leonie Bentveld (NED) | Lauren Molengraaf (NED) | Giorgia Pellizotti (ITA) | Leonie Bentveld (NED) |
| 14 December | (Belgium) Namur | 17.30 km | Leonie Bentveld (NED) | Amandine Muller (FRA) | Célia Gery (FRA) | Leonie Bentveld (NED) |
| 20 December | (Belgium) Antwerp | 19.87 km | Leonie Bentveld (NED) | Fleur Moors (BEL) | Célia Gery (FRA) | Leonie Bentveld (NED) |
| 21 December | (Belgium) Koksijde | 17.25 km | Leonie Bentveld (NED) | Célia Gery (FRA) | Fleur Moors (BEL) | Leonie Bentveld (NED) |
| 26 December | (Belgium) Gavere | 16.90 km | Célia Gery (FRA) | Viktória Chladoňová (SVK) | Amandine Muller (FRA) | Leonie Bentveld (NED) |
| 28 December | (Belgium) Dendermonde | 22.59 km | Leonie Bentveld (NED) | Célia Gery (FRA) | Rafaelle Carrier (CAN) | Leonie Bentveld (NED) |
| 4 January | (Belgium) Zonhoven | 19.27 km | Leonie Bentveld (NED) | Zoe Backstedt (GBR) | Fleur Moors (BEL) | Leonie Bentveld (NED) |
| 18 January | (Spain) Benidorm | 19.98 km | Célia Gery (FRA) | Fleur Moors (BEL) | Zoe Backstedt (GBR) | Leonie Bentveld (NED) |
| 24 January | (Belgium) Maasmechelen | 19.05 km | Zoe Backstedt (GBR) | Leonie Bentveld (NED) | Lauren Molengraaf (NED) | Leonie Bentveld (NED) |
| 25 January | (Netherlands) Hoogerheide | 21.83 km | Zoe Backstedt (GBR) | Viktória Chladoňová (SVK) | Fleur Moors (BEL) | Leonie Bentveld (NED) |

=== Under-23 Men ===
==== Race results ====
| Date | Race | Distance | Winner | Second | Third | Competition leader |
|---|---|---|---|---|---|---|
| 23 November | (Czech Republic) Tábor | 19.96 km | David Haverdings (NED) | Aubin Sparfel (FRA) | Stefano Viezzi (ITA) | David Haverdings (NED) |
| 30 November | (France) Flamanville | 20.35 km | Aubin Sparfel (FRA) | Yordi Corsus (BEL) | Stefano Viezzi (ITA) | Aubin Sparfel (FRA) |
| 21 December | (Belgium) Koksijde | 20.65 km | David Haverdings (NED) | Aubin Sparfel (FRA) | Guus van den Eijnden (NED) | Aubin Sparfel (FRA) |
| 28 December | (Belgium) Dendermonde | 25.09 km | David Haverdings (NED) | Arthur van den Boer (BEL) | Yordi Corsus (BEL) | David Haverdings (NED) |
| 18 January | (Spain) Benidorm | 19.98 km | David Haverdings (NED) | Yordi Corsus (BEL) | Aaron Dockx (BEL) | David Haverdings (NED) |
| 25 January | (Netherlands) Hoogerheide | 21.83 km | Aubin Sparfel (FRA) | David Haverdings (NED) | Stefano Viezzi (ITA) | David Haverdings (NED) |

=== Junior Women ===
==== Race results ====
| Date | Race | Distance | Winner | Second | Third | Competition leader |
|---|---|---|---|---|---|---|
| 23 November | (Czech Republic) Tábor | 13.36 km | Barbora Bukovská (CZE) | Lise Revol (FRA) | Giorgia Pellizotti (ITA) | Barbora Bukovská (CZE) |
| 30 November | (France) Flamanville | 14.55 km | Lise Revol (FRA) | Giorgia Pellizotti (ITA) | Lucie Grohová (CZE) | Lise Revol (FRA) |
| 21 December | (Belgium) Koksijde | 13.85 km | Lise Revol (FRA) | Laly Pichon (FRA) | Isis Versluis (NED) | Lise Revol (FRA) |
| 28 December | (Belgium) Dendermonde | 17.59 km | Lise Revol (FRA) | Shana Huber (SUI) | Isis Versluis (NED) | Lise Revol (FRA) |
| 18 January | (Spain) Benidorm | 13.32 km | Giorgia Pellizotti (ITA) | Lise Revol (FRA) | Barbora Bukovská (CZE) | Lise Revol (FRA) |
| 25 January | (Netherlands) Hoogerheide | 15.63 km | Giorgia Pellizotti (ITA) | Barbora Bukovská (CZE) | Shana Huber (SUI) | Lise Revol (FRA) |

=== Junior Men ===
==== Race results ====
| Date | Race | Distance | Winner | Second | Third | Competition leader |
|---|---|---|---|---|---|---|
| 23 November | (Czech Republic) Tábor | 16.66 km | Soren Bruyère Joumard (FRA) | Jari Van Lee (BEL) | Filippo Grigolini (ITA) | Soren Bruyère Joumard (FRA) |
| 30 November | (France) Flamanville | 14.55 km | Filippo Grigolini (ITA) | Soren Bruyère Joumard (FRA) | Patrik Pezzo Rosola (ITA) | Soren Bruyère Joumard (FRA) |
| 21 December | (Belgium) Koksijde | 17.25 km | Giel Lejeune (BEL) | Delano Heeren (NED) | Cas Timmermans (NED) | Filippo Grigolini (ITA) |
| 28 December | (Belgium) Dendermonde | 17.59 km | Patrik Pezzo Rosola (ITA) | Filippo Grigolini (ITA) | Giel Lejeune (BEL) | Filippo Grigolini (ITA) |
| 18 January | (Spain) Benidorm | 16.68 km | Patrik Pezzo Rosola (ITA) | Giel Lejeune (BEL) | Filippo Grigolini (ITA) | Patrik Pezzo Rosola (ITA) |
| 25 January | (Netherlands) Hoogerheide | 19.98 km | Soren Bruyère Joumard (FRA) | Patrik Pezzo Rosola (ITA) | Benjamín Noval Suárez (ESP) | Patrik Pezzo Rosola (ITA) |

== See also ==
- 2025–26 Cyclo-cross Superprestige
- 2025–26 X²O Badkamers Trophy
- 2025–26 UCI Cyclo-cross season
- 2026 UCI Cyclo-cross World Championships
