= 2026 UCI Cyclo-cross World Championships =

Cyclo-cross championship

- Venue: Hulst, Netherlands
- Date: 30 January – 1 February 2026
- Coordinates: 51°17′N 4°03′E
- Events: 7

The 2026 UCI Cyclo-cross World Championships was the 77th edition of the UCI Cyclo-cross World Championships, the annual world championship for the cycling discipline of cyclo-cross. It was held from 30 January to 1 February in Hulst, Netherlands. The championships were organized by the Union Cycliste Internationale and sponsored by Rabobank.

== Venue ==
Hulst was officially confirmed as the host city in September 2021. The city had previously hosted UCI Cyclo-cross World Cup races, but never a world championship.

The course was 3.24 kilometres (2.01 mi) long, with 40 metres (130 ft) of elevation gain, including 7 bridges and a section of 22 stairs.

== Competition schedule ==
All times are local, CET (UTC+1).

Date	Time	Race Category
30 January 2026	13:35	Mixed team relay
31 January 2026	11:05	Women's junior race
31 January 2026	13:10	Men's under-23 race
31 January 2026	15:10	Women's elite race
1 February 2026	11:05	Men's junior race
1 February 2026	13:10	Women's under-23 race
1 February 2026	15:10	Men's elite race

== Pre-race favorites ==
Mathieu van der Poel, the reigning seven-time champion, was widely seen as the favorite for the men's elite race. Expected challengers included Thibau Nys, Michael Vanthourenhout, Toon Aerts, Emiel Verstrynge, and Laurens Sweeck. Favorites for the women's elite race included Lucinda Brand, Inge van der Heijden, Aniek van Alphen, Puck Pieterse, and Amandine Fouquenet.

== Medal summary ==
Event	Gold		Silver		Bronze	
Women's events
Women's elite race	Lucinda Brand (NED)	49' 16"	Ceylin Alvarado (NED)	+27"	Puck Pieterse (NED)	+51"
Women's under-23 race	Leonie Bentveld (NED)	43' 08"	Viktória Chladoňová (SVK)	+11"	Célia Gery (FRA)	+57"
Women's junior race	Barbora Bukovská (CZE)	44' 55"	Lise Revol (FRA)	+15"	Lucie Grohová (CZE)	+35"
Men's events
Men's elite race	Mathieu van der Poel (NED)	1h 00' 25"	Tibor Del Grosso (NED)	+35"	Thibau Nys (BEL)	+46"
Men's under-23 race	Aaron Dockx (BEL)	53' 11"	Aubin Sparfel (FRA)	+19"	Keije Solen (NED)	+22"
Men's junior race	Delano Heeren (NED)	40' 15"	Filippo Grigolini (ITA)	+9"	Giel Lejeune (BEL)	+10"
Mixed events
Mixed team relay	Netherlands; Guus van den Eijnden; Delano Heeren; Isis Versluis; Leonie Bentveld; Shirin van Anrooij; Tibor Del Grosso	47' 06"	Italy; Filippo Grigolini; Stefano Viezzi; Sara Casasola; Elisa Ferri; Giorgia Pellizotti; Filippo Fontana	+16"	Belgium; Fleur Moors; Kay De Bruyckere; Julie Brouwers; Jari Van Lee; Zita Peeters; Niels Vandeputte	+37"

== Results ==
=== Women ===
==== Elite ====
The Elite Women's race took place on Saturday January 31, 2026 in 6 laps over a total distance of 19.60 km. 31 riders from 16 nations took part in the race.

Result
Rank	Cyclist	Nation	Time	Diff.
	Lucinda Brand	Netherlands	49:16	
2nd place, silver medalist(s)	Ceylin del Carmen Alvarado	Netherlands	49:43	+0:27
3rd place, bronze medalist(s)	Puck Pieterse	Netherlands	50:07	+0:51
4	Blanka Kata Vas	Hungary	50:12	+0:56
5	Amandine Fouquenet	France	50:14	+0:58
6	Jolanda Neff	Switzerland	50:18	+1:02
7	Zoe Bäckstedt	Great Britain	50:21	+1:05
8	Manon Bakker	Netherlands	50:27	+1:11
9	Shirin van Anrooij	Netherlands	50:36	+1:20
10	Marie Schreiber	Luxembourg	50:53	+1:37
11	Kristýna Zemanová	Czech Republic	51:21	+2:05
12	Hélène Clauzel	France	51:28	+2:12
13	Inge van der Heijden	Netherlands	51:33	+2:17
14	Aniek van Alphen	Netherlands	51:35	+2:19
15	Annemarie Worst	Netherlands	51:37	+2:21
16	Sidney McGill	Canada	53:16	+4:00
17	Sofia Rodriguez Revert	Spain	53:30	+4:14
18	Lucia Gonzalez Blanco	Spain	53:35	+4:19
19	Larissa Hartog	Netherlands	54:02	+4:46
20	Elizabeth Gunsalus	United States	54:09	+4:53
21	Rebekka Estermann	Switzerland	54:15	+4:59
22	Perrine Clauzel	France	54:35	+5:19
23	Zuzanna Krzystała	Poland	54:48	+5:32
24	Nadja Heigl	Austria	55:50	+6:34
25	Anna Megale	United States	55:51	+6:35
26	Maghalie Rochette	Canada	57:06	+7:50
27	Ann-Dorthe Lisbygd	Denmark	LAP	
28	Kasuga Watabe	Japan	LAP	
	Sara Casasola	Italy	DNF	
	Marion Norbert-Riberolle	Belgium	DSQ	
	Julie Brouwers	Belgium	DNS	

==== Under-23 ====
The Under-23 Women's race took place on Sunday February 1, 2026 in 5 laps over a total distance of 16.35 km. 32 riders from 15 nations took part in the race.

Result
Rank	Cyclist	Nation	Time	Diff.
	Leonie Bentveld	Netherlands	43:08	
2nd place, silver medalist(s)	Viktória Chladoňová	Slovakia	43:19	+0:11
3rd place, bronze medalist(s)	Célia Gery	France	44:05	+0:57
4	Fleur Moors	Belgium	44:22	+1:14
5	Amandine Muller	France	44:28	+1:20
6	Vida Lopez de San Roman	United States	44:31	+1:23
7	Alyssa Sarkisov	United States	44:58	+1:50
8	Lidia Cusack	United States	45:09	+2:01
9	Lison Desprez	France	45:12	+2:04
10	Elisa Ferri	Italy	45:15	+2:07
11	Bloeme Kalis	Netherlands	45:25	+2:17
12	Lauren Molengraaf	Netherlands	45:40	+2:32
13	Katherine Sarkisov	United States	45:49	+2:41
14	Electa Gallezot	France	46:06	+2:58
15	Liv Wenzel	Luxembourg	46:11	+3:03
16	Rafaelle Carrier	Canada	46:25	+3:17
17	Regina Bruchner	Hungary	46:33	+3:25
18	Puck Langenbarg	Netherlands	46:37	+3:29
19	Kateřina Hladíková	Czech Republic	46:37	+3:29
20	Amálie Gottwaldová	Czech Republic	46:53	+3:45
21	Mille Nielsen	Denmark	46:56	+3:48
22	Jana Glaus	Switzerland	46:57	+3:49
23	Nico Knoll	Canada	47:07	+3:59
24	Lorena Patiño Villanueva	Spain	47:08	+4:00
25	Lyllie Sonnemann	United States	47:40	+4:32
26	Kaya Musgrave	United States	48:26	+5:18
27	Thea Persson	Sweden	49:45	+6:37
28	Dorothee Perron	Canada	51:06	+7:58
29	Nelia Kabetaj	Albania	51:55	+8:47
	Mia Aseltine	United States	DNF	
	Shanyl De Schoesitter	Belgium	DNS	
	Layla Barthels	Luxembourg	DNS	

==== Junior ====
The Junior Women's race took place on Saturday January 31, 2026 in 5 laps over a total distance of 16.35 km. 47 riders from 19 nations took part in the race.

Result
Rank	Cyclist	Nation	Time	Diff.
	Barbora Bukovská	Czech Republic	44:55	
2nd place, silver medalist(s)	Lise Revol	France	45:10	+0:15
3rd place, bronze medalist(s)	Lucie Grohová	Czech Republic	45:30	+0:35
4	Giorgia Pellizotti	Italy	45:39	+0:44
5	Shana Huber	Switzerland	45:43	+0:48
6	Nynke Jochems	Netherlands	46:04	+1:09
7	Zélie Lambert	France	46:38	+1:43
8	Zoe Roche	Great Britain	46:47	+1:52
9	Alexa Haviland	Canada	46:49	+1:54
10	Laly Pichon	France	46:55	+2:00
11	Rianne Nieuwenhuis	Netherlands	47:09	+2:14
12	Aitana Gutierrez Velarde	Spain	47:11	+2:16
13	Peggy Knox	Great Britain	47:19	+2:24
14	Nicole Azzetti	Italy	47:26	+2:31
15	Liese Geuens	Belgium	47:48	+2:53
16	Nicole Righetto	Italy	47:55	+3:00
17	Lujza Bartošíková	Slovakia	48:03	+3:08
18	Kira Mullins	United States	48:10	+3:15
19	Elisa Bianchi	Italy	48:21	+3:26
20	Barbora Šíslová	Czech Republic	48:29	+3:34
21	Lucie Elizalde	France	48:52	+3:57
22	Aida Linton	United States	48:59	+4:04
23	Nanami Ishikawa	Japan	49:05	+4:10
24	Greta Andersson	Sweden	49:06	+4:11
25	Mirari Gotxi Olartekoetxea	Spain	49:14	+4:19
26	Ada Watson	United States	49:19	+4:24
27	Maxime Takken	Netherlands	49:32	+4:37
28	Beatrix Attelmann	Germany	49:41	+4:46
29	Karolína Bortelová	Slovakia	49:58	+5:03
30	Ayaka Hiyoshi	Japan	50:02	+5:07
31	Karolína Rothbauerová	Czech Republic	50:25	+5:30
32	Tessa Beebe	United States	50:28	+5:33
33	Claire MacKinnon	Canada	50:31	+5:36
34	Carla Bañuls Puente	Spain	50:37	+5:42
35	Elsa Elf Boberg	Sweden	50:39	+5:44
36	Graden Daume	United States	50:43	+5:48
37	Alana Fletcher	Australia	51:02	+6:07
38	Aoi Kobayashi	Japan	51:30	+6:35
39	Gisele Rang	Estonia	53:27	+8:32
40	Sophie Hiswin	New Zealand	LAP	
41	Alicia Reynolds	Australia	LAP	
	Eva Drhová	Czech Republic	DNF	
	Ida Mahlert	Denmark	DNF	
	Amandine Jakob	Germany	DNS	
	June Nothum	Luxembourg	DNS	
	Isis Versluis	Netherlands	DNS	
	Zita Peeters	Belgium	DNS	

=== Men ===
==== Elite ====
The Elite Men's race took place on Sunday February 1, 2026 in 8 laps over a total distance of 26.10 km. 39 riders from 17 nations took part in the race.

Result
Rank	Cyclist	Nation	Time	Diff.
	Mathieu van der Poel	Netherlands	1:00:25	
2nd place, silver medalist(s)	Tibor del Grosso	Netherlands	1:01:00	+0:35
3rd place, bronze medalist(s)	Thibau Nys	Belgium	1:01:11	+0:46
4	Joris Nieuwenhuis	Netherlands	1:01:20	+0:55
5	Filippo Fontana	Italy	1:01:20	+0:55
6	Gerben Kuypers	Belgium	1:01:23	+0:58
7	Felipe Orts	Spain	1:01:29	+1:04
8	Toon Aerts	Belgium	1:01:29	+1:04
9	Jente Michels	Belgium	1:01:29	+1:04
10	Michael Vanthourenhout	Belgium	1:02:00	+1:35
11	Kevin Kuhn	Switzerland	1:02:09	+1:44
12	Mees Hendrikx	Netherlands	1:02:16	+1:51
13	Joran Wyseure	Belgium	1:02:34	+2:09
14	Michael Boroš	Czech Republic	1:02:40	+2:15
15	Martin Groslambert	France	1:02:51	+2:26
16	David Menut	France	1:03:07	+2:42
17	Ryan Kamp	Netherlands	1:03:16	+2:51
18	Danny van Lierop	Netherlands	1:03:22	+2:57
19	Lars van der Haar	Netherlands	1:03:31	+3:06
20	Loris Rouiller	Switzerland	1:03:44	+3:19
21	Cameron Mason	Great Britain	1:03:49	+3:24
22	Nathan Bommenel	France	1:04:05	+3:40
23	Toon Vandebosch	Belgium	1:04:36	+4:11
24	Rémi Lelandais	France	1:04:39	+4:14
25	Fabian Eder	Germany	1:04:45	+4:20
26	Marcel Meisen	Germany	1:04:53	+4:28
27	Niels Vandeputte	Belgium	1:05:00	+4:35
28	Mario Junquera	Spain	1:05:03	+4:38
29	Kevin Suarez Fernandez	Spain	1:05:14	+4:49
30	Pim Ronhaar	Netherlands	1:06:28	+6:03
31	Andrew Strohmeyer	United States	1:07:21	+6:56
32	Lars Sommer	Switzerland	LAP	
33	David Risberg	Sweden	LAP	
34	Karl-Erik Rosendahl	Denmark	2LAP	
35	Cody Scott	Canada	3LAP	
36	Jacob Turner	New Zealand	3LAP	
37	Felipe Timoteo Nystrom Spencer	Costa Rica	4LAP	
38	Dovydas Lukšas	Lithuania	5LAP	
	Loïc Bettendorff	Luxembourg	DNS	

==== Under-23 ====
The Under-23 Men's race took place on Saturday January 31, 2026 in 7 laps over a total distance of 22.85 km. 47 riders from 17 nations took part in the race.

Result
Rank	Cyclist	Nation	Time	Diff.
	Aaron Dockx	Belgium	53:11	
2nd place, silver medalist(s)	Aubin Sparfel	France	53:30	+0:19
3rd place, bronze medalist(s)	Keije Solen	Netherlands	53:33	+0:22
4	Guus van den Eijnden	Netherlands	53:34	+0:23
5	Arthur van den Boer	Belgium	53:41	+0:30
6	Barnabás Vas	Hungary	53:47	+0:36
7	Raul Mira Bonastre	Spain	53:48	+0:37
8	Léo Bisiaux	France	53:48	+0:37
9	Oscar Amey	Great Britain	54:02	+0:51
10	Jules Simon	France	54:20	+1:09
11	Viktor Vandenberghe	Belgium	54:22	+1:11
12	Mats Vanden Eynde	Belgium	54:23	+1:12
13	Henry Coote	United States	54:24	+1:13
14	David Haverdings	Netherlands	54:26	+1:15
15	Zsombor Takács	Hungary	54:46	+1:35
16	Sil De Brauwere	Belgium	54:54	+1:43
17	Romain Debord	France	55:06	+1:55
18	Kenay De Moyer	Belgium	55:06	+1:55
19	Max Heiner Oertzen	Germany	55:16	+2:05
20	Michiel Mouris	Netherlands	55:41	+2:30
21	Kryštof Bažant	Czech Republic	55:47	+2:36
22	Hannes Degenkolb	Germany	55:48	+2:37
23	Maximilian Kerl	Czech Republic	55:56	+2:45
24	Senna Remijn	Netherlands	56:00	+2:49
25	Eike Behrens	Germany	56:01	+2:50
26	Ryan Drummond	United States	56:28	+3:17
27	Rafael Sousa	Portugal	56:35	+3:24
28	Alexis David	France	56:35	+3:24
29	Floris Haverdings	Netherlands	56:47	+3:36
30	Ben Askey	Great Britain	56:48	+3:37
31	Théophile Vassal	France	56:50	+3:39
32	Silas Kuschla	Germany	56:52	+3:41
33	Calvin Conaway	United States	56:59	+3:48
34	František Hojka	Czech Republic	57:08	+3:57
35	Shingen Yunoki	Japan	57:11	+4:00
36	Daniel Nielsen	Denmark	57:26	+4:15
37	Lennox Papi	Luxembourg	58:05	+4:54
38	Zenshin Nozaki	Japan	58:45	+5:34
39	Declan Oldham	Great Britain	59:02	+5:51
40	Rhett Bates	Canada	59:07	+5:56
41	Mads Jørgensen	Denmark	59:19	+6:08
42	Artur Nichvolodov	Ukraine	LAP	
43	Mathis Duval	Canada	2LAP	
	Yordi Corsus	Belgium	DNF	
	Peter Šoltés	Slovakia	DNF	
	Jonas Posselt Gamborg	Denmark	DNF	
	Stefano Viezzi	Italy	DSQ	

==== Junior ====
The Junior Men's race took place on Sunday February 1, 2026 in 5 laps over a total distance of 16.35 km. 61 riders from 20 nations took part in the race.

Result
Rank	Cyclist	Nation	Time	Diff.
	Delano Heeren	Netherlands	40:15	
2nd place, silver medalist(s)	Filippo Grigolini	Italy	40:24	+0:09
3rd place, bronze medalist(s)	Giel Lejeune	Belgium	40:25	+0:10
4	Benjamin Noval Suarez	Spain	40:30	+0:15
5	Soen Le Pann	France	40:58	+0:43
6	Soren Bruyere Joumard	France	41:19	+1:04
7	Noël Goijert	Netherlands	41:24	+1:09
8	Patrik Pezzo Rosola	Italy	41:31	+1:16
9	Raul Lopez Sainz	Spain	41:37	+1:22
10	Francesco Dell'Olio	Italy	41:41	+1:26
11	Victor Devos	France	41:41	+1:26
12	Luke Trafford	Great Britain	41:43	+1:28
13	Milo Wills	Great Britain	41:43	+1:28
14	Lars Corsus	Belgium	41:55	+1:40
15	Michal Šichta	Slovakia	42:00	+1:45
16	Ethan Brown	United States	42:06	+1:51
17	Bas Vanden Eynde	Belgium	42:07	+1:52
18	Benedek Berencsi	Hungary	42:20	+2:05
19	Cas Timmermans	Netherlands	42:23	+2:08
20	Kacper Mizuro	Poland	42:24	+2:09
21	Loek Hovers	Netherlands	42:38	+2:23
22	Emilien Belzile	Canada	42:38	+2:23
23	Antonín John	Czech Republic	42:50	+2:35
24	Jop van den Biggelaar	Netherlands	42:54	+2:39
25	Jari Van Lee	Belgium	42:58	+2:43
26	Martin Fernandez Garcia	Spain	43:01	+2:46
27	Milan Húsenica	Slovakia	43:09	+2:54
28	Farland Lamont	Canada	43:09	+2:54
29	Jacob Steed	Great Britain	43:15	+3:00
30	Matthew Crabbe	United States	43:17	+3:02
31	Tommaso Cingolani	Italy	43:19	+3:04
32	David Svoboda	Czech Republic	43:24	+3:09
33	Johannes Brædstrup-Holm	Denmark	43:26	+3:11
34	Melvin Pålsson Gustafsson	Sweden	43:36	+3:21
35	Ben Fleming	Luxembourg	43:40	+3:25
36	Kai van Hoof	Netherlands	43:52	+3:37
37	Jan Prell	Germany	44:09	+3:54
38	Krzysztof Gdula	Poland	44:11	+3:56
39	Villads Nyegaard	Denmark	44:32	+4:17
40	Jerguš Melichercík	Slovakia	44:33	+4:18
41	Eduard John	Czech Republic	44:37	+4:22
42	Shuntaro Yamada	Japan	44:44	+4:29
43	Porter Melvin	United States	44:46	+4:31
44	João Vigário	Portugal	44:47	+4:32
45	Shogo Mikami	Japan	45:02	+4:47
46	Sagan Goertz	Canada	45:11	+4:56
47	Magnus Dollerup	Denmark	45:14	+4:59
48	Alwin Beyer	Germany	45:34	+5:19
49	Tadeáš Pazourek	Czech Republic	45:50	+5:35
50	Hayden Vimpani	Australia	45:56	+5:41
51	Ben Koenig	Luxembourg	45:57	+5:42
52	Mathias Petersen	Denmark	45:59	+5:44
53	Grayson Franks	Canada	46:03	+5:48
54	Casper Fransson	Sweden	46:29	+6:14
55	Niclas Look	Germany	46:41	+6:26
56	Oliver Grande	Australia	47:10	+6:55
57	Hugo Ramalho	Portugal	47:18	+7:03
58	Kacper Zygmuntowicz	Poland	47:44	+7:29
59	Aron Dahlberg	Sweden	47:50	+7:35
60	Jacob Hines	United States	47:59	+7:44
61	Clayson Kabetaj	Albania	2LAP	

=== Mixed Event ===
==== Team Relay ====
This will be the 5th edition of the Mixed Team Relay event at the world championships. Each relay team consisted of 6 riders which could be made up of:

- 1 Elite Men or 1 Under-23 Men rider,
- 1 Under-23 Men or 1 Junior Men rider,
- 1 Junior Men rider,
- 1 Elite Women or 1 Under-23 Women rider,
- 1 Under-23 Women or 1 Junior Women rider,
- 1 Junior Women rider,

Each rider must also be participating in an individual event at the world championships. Each rider rides on lap, with each nation choosing the starting order of their riders.

== Medals table ==
* Host nation (Netherlands)

Rank	Nation	Gold	Silver	Bronze	Total
1	Netherlands (NED)*	5	2	2	9
2	Belgium (BEL)	1	0	3	4
3	Czech Republic (CZE)	1	0	1	2
4	France (FRA)	0	2	1	3
5	Italy (ITA)	0	2	0	2
6	Slovakia (SVK)	0	1	0	1
Totals (6 entries)		7	7	7	21

== See also ==
- 2025–26 UCI Cyclo-cross World Cup
- 2025 UEC European Cyclo-cross Championships
