= UCI Cyclo-cross World Championships – Women's under-23 race =

Annual world cyclo-cross championship for women aged 23 or under

- Rainbow jersey

Race details
- Date: End of January, beginning of February
- Discipline: Cyclo-cross
- Type: One-day
- Organiser: UCI

History
- First edition: 2016
- Editions: 9 (as of 2024)
- First winner: Evie Richards (GBR)
- Most wins: Evie Richards (GBR) (2 wins)
- Most recent: Zoe Bäckstedt (GBR)

The UCI Cyclo-cross World Championships – Women's Under-23 Cyclo-cross is the annual world championship in the discipline of cyclo-cross for women aged 23 or under, organised by the world governing body, the Union Cycliste Internationale. The event was first run in 2016. The winner has the right to wear the rainbow jersey for a full year when competing in Under-23 cyclo-cross events.

== Palmarès ==
| Year | Gold | Silver | Bronze |
|---|---|---|---|
| 2016 | Evie Richards (GBR) | Nikola Nosková (CZE) | Maud Kaptheijns (NED) |
| 2017 | Annemarie Worst (NED) | Ellen Noble (USA) | Evie Richards (GBR) |
| 2018 | Evie Richards (GBR) | Ceylin del Carmen Alvarado (NED) | Nadja Heigl (AUT) |
| 2019 | Inge van der Heijden (NED) | Fleur Nagengast (NED) | Ceylin del Carmen Alvarado (NED) |
| 2020 | Marion Norbert-Riberolle (FRA) | Blanka Vas (HUN) | Anna Kay (GBR) |
| 2021 | Fem van Empel (NED) | Anniek van Alphen (NED) | Blanka Vas (HUN) |
| 2022 | Puck Pieterse (NED) | Shirin van Anrooij (NED) | Fem van Empel (NED) |
| 2023 | Shirin van Anrooij (NED) | Zoe Bäckstedt (GBR) | Kristýna Zemanová (CZE) |
| 2024 | Zoe Bäckstedt (GBR) | Kristýna Zemanová (CZE) | Leonie Bentveld (NED) |
| 2025 | Zoe Bäckstedt (GBR) | Marie Schreiber (LUX) | Leonie Bentveld (NED) |
| 2026 | Leonie Bentveld (NED) | Viktória Chladoňová (SVK) | Célia Gery (FRA) |

== Medal count by country ==
| Rank | Nation | Gold | Silver | Bronze | Total |
|---|---|---|---|---|---|
| 1 | Netherlands (NED) | 5 | 4 | 5 | 14 |
| 2 | Great Britain (GBR) | 4 | 1 | 2 | 7 |
| 3 | France (FRA) | 1 | 0 | 0 | 1 |
| 4 | Czech Republic (CZE) | 0 | 2 | 1 | 3 |
| 5 | Hungary (HUN) | 0 | 1 | 1 | 2 |
| 6 | Luxembourg (LUX) | 0 | 1 | 0 | 1 |
| 6 | United States (USA) | 0 | 1 | 0 | 1 |
| 8 | Austria (AUT) | 0 | 0 | 1 | 1 |
| Totals (8 entries) | | 10 | 10 | 10 | 30 |
