= Keije Solen =

French cyclist

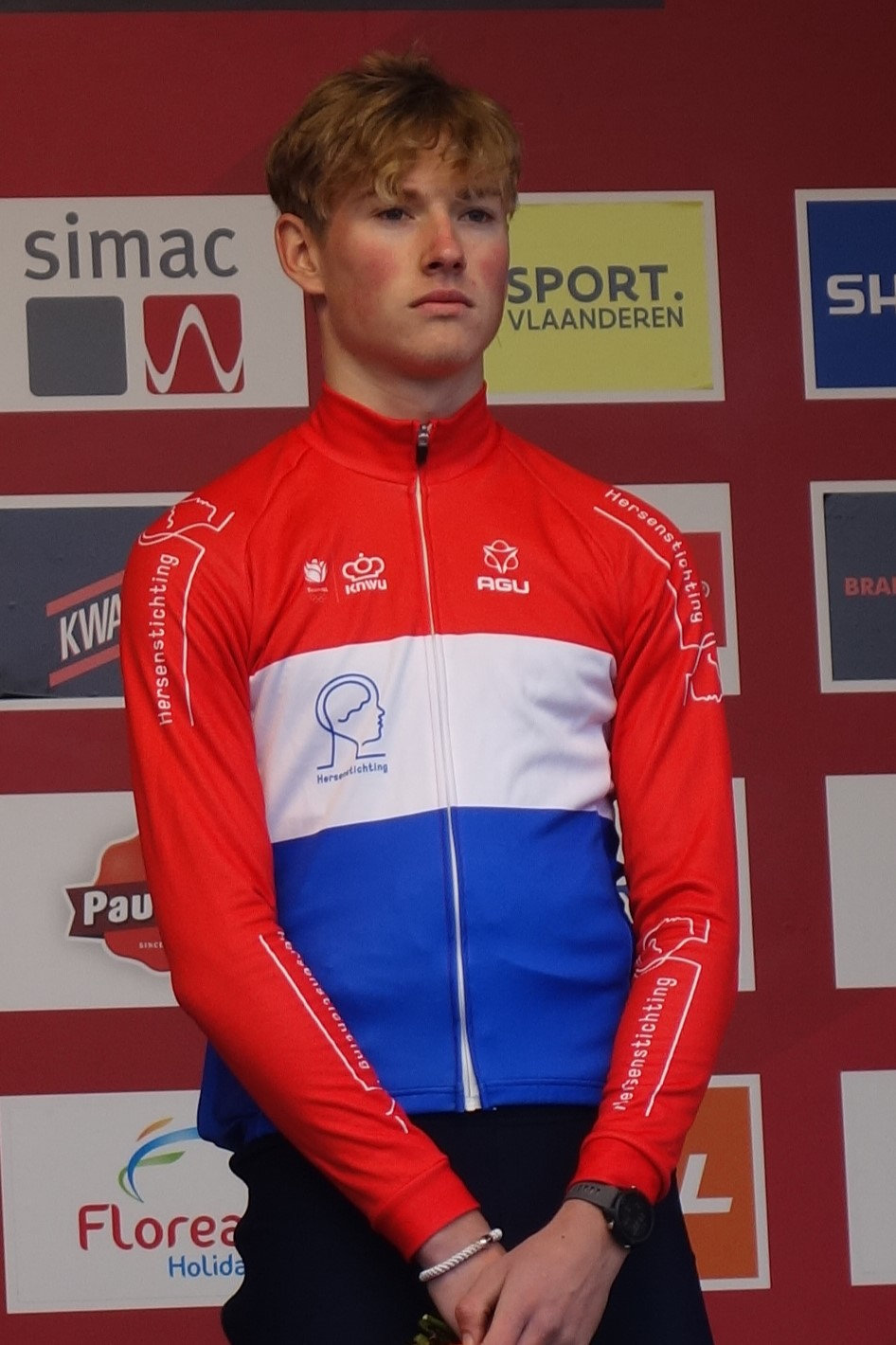
- Solen in 2023

Personal information
- Born: 27 March 2006 (age 20)
- Height: 1.84 m (6 ft 0 in)
- Weight: 67 kg (148 lb)

Cycling career
- Sport: Cycling
- Current team: Lotto–Groupe Wanty; Charles Liégeois–Deschacht
- Disciplines: Road; Cyclo-cross
- Role: Rider

Amateur teams
- 2023: Streetjump–ABLOC
- 2024: Goudenbod–Parkhotel Development Team

Professional teams
- 2024–: Charles Liégeois Roastery CX (cyclo-cross)
- 2025–: Lotto Development Team (road)
Medal record
Men's cyclo-cross
Representing Netherlands
World Championships
| Silver medal – second place | 2024 Tábor | Junior |
| Bronze medal – third place | 2026 Hulst | Under-23 |

Keije Solen (born 3 May 2006) is a Dutch cyclo-cross and road cyclist, who rides for UCI Continental team Lotto–Groupe Wanty.

== Major results ==
=== Cyclo-cross ===
2022–2023
1st National Junior Championships
2023–2024
2nd UCI World Junior Championships
2nd National Junior Championships
3rd Overall UCI Junior World Cup
2024–2025
3rd National Under-23 Championships
2025–2026
3rd UCI World Under-23 Championships
3rd National Under-23 Championships

=== Road ===
2023
9th La Route des Géants
2024
1st Stage 3 Côte d'Or Classic Juniors
4th Road race, National Junior Road Championships
5th Overall Grand Prix Rüebliland
2025
2nd Grand Prix de la ville de Pérenchies
5th Overall Tour de Kumano

1st Young rider classification

2026
1st Stage 2 Tour de l'Avenir
1st Stages 2 & 3 Tour de Namur
1st Stage 4 Ronde de l'Oise
1st Stage 4 Tour du Loir-et-Cher
2nd Omloop Het Nieuwsblad U23
4th Overall Province Cycling Tour

1st Stage 3
