= Tibor Del Grosso =

Dutch cyclist

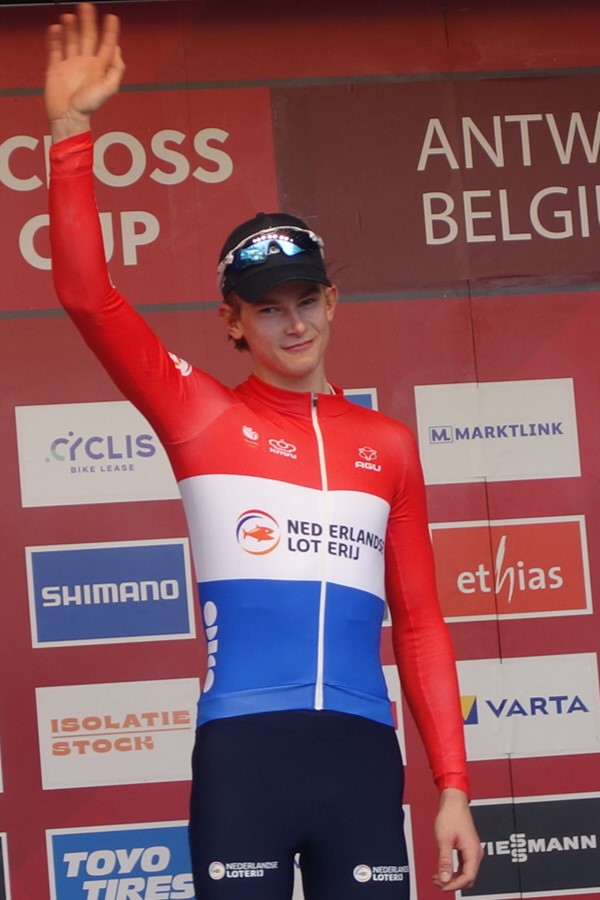
- Tibor del Grosso in 2023

Personal information
- Born: 27 July 2003 (age 23)
- Height: 1.90 m (6 ft 3 in)

Cycling career
- Sport: Cycling
- Current team: Alpecin–Premier Tech
- Disciplines: Cyclo-cross; Road; Mountain bike
- Role: Rider

Amateur team
- 2021: Streetjump–Forte

Professional teams
- 2022–2023: Metec–Solarwatt p/b Mantel
- 2023–2024: Alpecin–Deceuninck Development Team
- 2025–: Alpecin–Deceuninck

Major wins
- Cyclo-cross National Championships (2025, 2026)
Medal record
Men's cyclo-cross
Representing the Netherlands
World Championships
| Gold medal – first place | 2023 Hoogerheide | Team relay |
| Gold medal – first place | 2024 Tábor | Under-23 |
| Gold medal – first place | 2025 Liévin | Under-23 |
| Gold medal – first place | 2026 Hulst | Team relay |
| Silver medal – second place | 2023 Hoogerheide | Under-23 |
| Silver medal – second place | 2026 Hulst | Elite |

Tibor Del Grosso (born 27 July 2003) is a Dutch cyclo-cross, road and mountain bike cyclist, who currently rides for UCI WorldTeam Alpecin–Premier Tech. He won the gold medal in the men's under-23 race at the 2024 UCI Cyclo-cross World Championships and the silver medal in the same event at the 2023 UCI Cyclo-cross World Championships. He also won the gold medal in the team relay at the 2023 World Championships. He occasionally competes in cross-country mountain biking, having won the 2022 national under-23 championships.

== Biography ==
As a junior (under-19), Del Grosso achieved international results in both road cycling and cyclo-cross. In 2020, he became the Dutch national junior cyclo-cross champion. In 2021, he focused almost exclusively on road cycling and won the national titles in the road race and the individual time trial. He won the general classification of the Ronde des Vallées, as well as a stage of the SPIE Internationale Juniorendriedaagse. When he joined the under-23 category for the 2022 season, he signed with the UCI Continental team Metec–Solarwatt p/b Mantel. With this team, he achieved numerous top-10 finishes in his first season. Also active in mountain biking, he became the Dutch national under-23 cross-country champion in 2022. In cyclo-cross, he concentrated on the major races, the UCI Cyclo-cross World Cup, and the championships. He made his breakthrough in the 2022–2023 season, becoming the Dutch national under-23 cyclo-cross champion and finishing second overall in the Under-23 World Cup, after winning his first World Cup race in Besançon. At the end of the season, at the World Championships on home soil, he became vice-world champion in the under-23 race and world champion in the mixed relay.

At the end of the 2023 season, Del Grosso joined the UCI Continental team Alpecin–Deceuninck Development Team. During the 2023–2024 cyclo-cross season, he won four rounds and the general classification of the Under-23 World Cup, and became under-23 cyclo-cross world champion ahead of Belgians Emiel Verstrynge and Jente Michels.

== Major results ==
=== Cyclo-cross ===
2019–2020
1st National Junior Championships
Junior DVV Trophy

1st Loenhout

1st Junior Woerden
Junior Superprestige

2nd Middelkerke

2nd Junior Hulst
UCI Junior World Cup

4th Nommay
4th Heusden-Zolder
5th Hoogerheide

5th UCI World Junior Championships
2022–2023
1st National Under-23 Championships
2nd UCI World Under-23 Championships
2nd Overall UCI Under-23 World Cup

1st Besançon
2nd Benidorm
3rd Zonhoven

2023–2024
1st UCI World Under-23 Championships
1st Overall UCI Under-23 World Cup

1st Troyes
1st Dublin
1st Antwerpen
1st Hoogerheide
4th Benidorm

1st Nijverdal
2024–2025
1st UCI World Under-23 Championships
1st National Championships
1st Overall UCI Under-23 World Cup

1st Hulst
1st Zonhoven
1st Besançon
1st Benidorm
1st Hoogerheide

Under-23 X²O Badkamers Trophy

1st Herentals

X²O Badkamers Trophy

2nd Koksijde

UCI World Cup

5th Namur

2025–2026
1st National Championships
Superprestige

1st Heusden-Zolder
1st Diegem

2nd UCI World Championships
UCI World Cup

2nd Dendermonde
2nd Zonhoven
2nd Maasmechelen
2nd Hoogerheide
3rd Gavere
4th Koksijde
4th Benidorm

=== Road ===
2020
2nd Time trial, National Junior Championships
2021
National Junior Championships

1st Road race
1st Time trial

1st Overall Ronde des Vallées

1st Stage 1

5th Overall SPIE Internationale Juniorendriedaagse

1st Points classification
1st Stage 3

5th Overall Internationale Juniorenrundfahrt
6th Overall Course de la Paix Juniors
2022
8th Overall Kreiz Breizh Elites
2023
2nd Overall Flanders Tomorrow Tour

1st Points classification

6th Overall Kreiz Breizh Elites
2024
1st Road race, National Under-23 Championships
1st GP New York City
1st Prologue Oberösterreich Rundfahrt
2nd SD WORX BW Classic
5th Youngster Coast Challenge
7th Road race, UEC European Under-23 Championships
8th Road race, UCI World Under-23 Championships
8th Paris–Roubaix Espoirs
2025 (1 pro win)
1st Stage 2 Tour of Turkey
3rd Dwars door het Hageland
5th Overall Tour of Norway
5th Antwerp Port Epic
6th Dwars door Vlaanderen
9th Overall Renewi Tour

1st Young rider classification

10th Overall Danmark Rundt
10th Brabantse Pijl
2026 (1)
1st NXT Classic
4th Famenne Ardenne Classic
5th Road race, National Championships
9th Grand Prix de Denain

=== Mountain bike ===
2020
3rd Cross-country, National Junior Championships
2021
2nd Junior Watersley
2nd Junior Spaarnwoude
2022
1st Cross-country, National Under-23 Championships
