= 2024 UCI Cyclo-cross World Championships =

Cyclo-cross championship

- Venue: Tábor, Czech Republic
- Date: 2–4 February 2024
- Coordinates: 49°24′52″N 14°39′28″E
- Events: 7

The 2024 UCI Cyclo-cross World Championships were held between the 2nd and 4th February 2024 in Tábor, Czech Republic.

== Medal summary ==
Event	Gold		Silver		Bronze	
Men's events
Men's elite race	Mathieu van der Poel (NED)	58' 14"	Joris Nieuwenhuis (NED)	+37"	Michael Vanthourenhout (BEL)	+1' 06"
Men's under-23 race	Tibor Del Grosso (NED)	52' 02"	Emiel Verstrynge (BEL)	+27"	Jente Michels (BEL)	+27"
Men's junior race	Stefano Viezzi (ITA)	42' 01"	Keije Solen (NED)	+9"	Kryštof Bažant (CZE)	+31"
Women's events
Women's elite race	Fem van Empel (NED)	46' 19"	Lucinda Brand (NED)	+1' 20"	Puck Pieterse (NED)	+1' 54"
Women's under-23 race	Zoe Bäckstedt (GBR)	48' 28"	Kristýna Zemanová (CZE)	+44"	Leonie Bentveld (NED)	+55"
Women's junior race	Célia Gery (FRA)	37' 01"	Cat Ferguson (GBR)	+6"	Viktória Chladoňová (SVK)	+14"
Mixed events
Team relay	France; Rémi Lelandais; Martin Groslambert; Célia Gery; Lauriane Duraffourg; Hélène Clauzel; Aubin Sparfel	1h 01' 23"	Great Britain; Cat Ferguson; Zoe Bäckstedt; Anna Kay; Oscar Amey; Corran Carrick-Anderson; Cameron Mason	s.t.	Belgium; Arthur Van den Boer; Ward Huybs; Shanyl De Schoesitter; Julie Brouwers; Sanne Cant; Michael Vanthourenhout	+32"

=== Medals table ===
* Host nation (Czech Republic)

Rank	Nation	Gold	Silver	Bronze	Total
1	Netherlands (NED)	3	3	2	8
2	France (FRA)	2	0	0	2
3	Great Britain (GBR)	1	2	0	3
4	Italy (ITA)	1	0	0	1
5	Belgium (BEL)	0	1	3	4
6	Czech Republic (CZE)*	0	1	1	2
7	Slovakia (SVK)	0	0	1	1
Totals (7 entries)		7	7	7	21
