= UCI Cyclo-cross World Championships – Men's under-23 race =

- Rainbow jersey

Race details
- Date: End of January, beginning of February
- Discipline: Cyclo-cross
- Type: One-day
- Organiser: UCI

History
- First edition: 1996
- Editions: 31 (as of 2026)
- First winner: Miguel Martinez (FRA)
- Most wins: Sven Nys (BEL); Bart Wellens (BEL); Zdeněk Štybar (CZE); Lars Van der Haar (NED); Eli Iserbyt (BEL) (2 times)
- Most recent: Aaron Dockx (BEL)

The UCI Cyclo-cross World Championships – Men's Under-23 Cyclo-cross is the annual world championship for in the discipline of cyclo-cross for men aged 23 or under, organised by the world governing body, the Union Cycliste Internationale. The event was first run in 1996. The winner has the right to wear the rainbow jersey for a full year when competing in Under-23 cyclo-cross events.

== Palmares ==
Year	Gold	Silver	Bronze
1996	Miguel Martinez (FRA)	Patrick Blum (SUI)	Zdeněk Mlynář (CZE)
1997	Sven Nys (BEL)	Bart Wellens (BEL)	Christophe Morel (FRA)
1998	Sven Nys (BEL)	Bart Wellens (BEL)	Petr Dlask (CZE)
1999	Bart Wellens (BEL)	Tom Vannoppen (BEL)	Tim Johnson (USA)
2000	Bart Wellens (BEL)	Tom Vannoppen (BEL)	Davy Commeyne (BEL)
2001	Sven Vanthourenhout (BEL)	Tomáš Trunschka (CZE)	David Kasek (CZE)
2002	Thijs Verhagen (NED)	Davy Commeyne (BEL)	Tomáš Trunschka (CZE)
2003	Enrico Franzoi (ITA)	Wesley Van Der Linden (BEL)	Thijs Verhagen (NED)
2004	Kevin Pauwels (BEL)	Mariusz Gil (POL)	Martin Zlámalík (CZE)
2005	Zdeněk Štybar (CZE)	Radomír Šimůnek (CZE)	Simon Zahner (SUI)
2006	Zdeněk Štybar (CZE)	Lars Boom (NED)	Niels Albert (BEL)
2007	Lars Boom (NED)	Niels Albert (BEL)	Romain Villa (FRA)
2008	Niels Albert (BEL)	Aurélien Duval (FRA)	Cristian Cominelli (ITA)
2009	Philipp Walsleben (GER)	Christoph Pfingsten (GER)	Pawel Szczepaniak (POL)
2010	Arnaud Jouffroy (FRA)	Tom Meeusen (BEL)	Marek Konwa (POL)
2011	Lars Van der Haar (NED)	Mike Teunissen (NED)	Karel Hník (CZE)
2012	Lars Van der Haar (NED)	Wietse Bosmans (BEL)	Michiel van der Heijden (NED)
2013	Mike Teunissen (NED)	Wietse Bosmans (BEL)	Wout Van Aert (BEL)
2014	Wout Van Aert (BEL)	Michael Vanthourenhout (BEL)	Mathieu van der Poel (NED)
2015	Michael Vanthourenhout (BEL)	Laurens Sweeck (BEL)	Stan Godrie (NED)
2016	Eli Iserbyt (BEL)	Adam Ťoupalík (CZE)	Quinten Hermans (BEL)
2017	Joris Nieuwenhuis (NED)	Felipe Orts (ESP)	Sieben Wouters (NED)
2018	Eli Iserbyt (BEL)	Joris Nieuwenhuis (NED)	Yan Gras (FRA)
2019	Tom Pidcock (GBR)	Eli Iserbyt (BEL)	Antoine Benoist (FRA)
2020	Ryan Kamp (NED)	Kevin Kuhn (SUI)	Mees Hendrikx (NED)
2021	Pim Ronhaar (NED)	Ryan Kamp (NED)	Timo Kielich (BEL)
2022	Joran Wyseure (BEL)	Emiel Verstrynge (BEL)	Thibau Nys (BEL)
2023	Thibau Nys (BEL)	Tibor Del Grosso (NED)	Witse Meeussen (BEL)
2024	Tibor Del Grosso (NED)	Emiel Verstrynge (BEL)	Jente Michels (BEL)
2025	Tibor Del Grosso (NED)	Kay De Bruyckere (BEL)	Jente Michels (BEL)
2026	Aaron Dockx (BEL)	Aubin Sparfel (FRA)	Keije Solen (NED)

== Medal count by country ==
Rank	Nation	Gold	Silver	Bronze	Total
1	Belgium (BEL)	14	16	9	39
2	Netherlands (NED)	10	5	7	22
3	Czech Republic (CZE)	2	3	6	11
4	France (FRA)	2	2	4	8
5	Germany (GER)	1	1	0	2
6	Italy (ITA)	1	0	1	2
7	Great Britain (GBR)	1	0	0	1
8	Switzerland (SUI)	0	2	1	3
9	Poland (POL)	0	1	2	3
10	Spain (ESP)	0	1	0	1
11	United States (USA)	0	0	1	1
Totals (11 entries)		31	31	31	93
