= Shirin van Anrooij =

Dutch cyclist

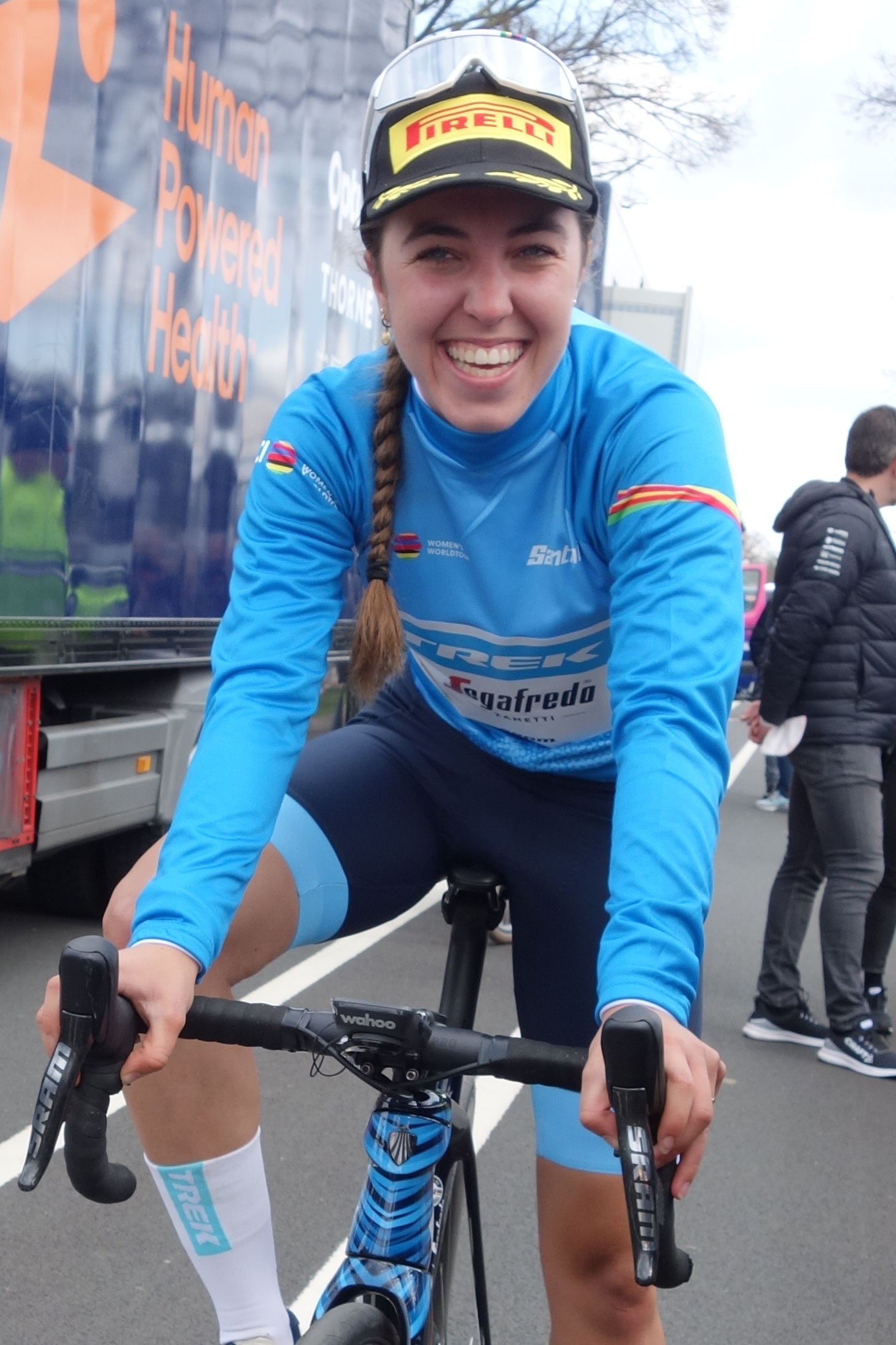
- Shirin van Anrooij in 2022

Personal information
- Born: 5 February 2002 (age 24) Goes, Netherlands

Cycling career
- Sport: Cycling
- Current team: Lidl–Trek (road); Baloise Glowi Lions (cyclo-cross)
- Disciplines: Road; Cyclo-cross
- Role: Rider

Professional team
- 2020–: Trek–Segafredo

Major wins
- Cyclo-cross World Cup 3 individual wins (2022–23) Road Major Tours Tour de France Young rider classification (2022) One-day races and Classics Trofeo Alfredo Binda (2023)
Medal record
Representing the Netherlands
Women's cyclo-cross
World Championships
Gold medal – first place	2023 Hoogerheide	Under-23
Gold medal – first place	2026 Hulst	Team Relay
Silver medal – second place	2022 Fayetteville	Under-23
Women's road bicycle racing
World Championships
Silver medal – second place	2022 Wollongong	Under-23 time trial
European Championships
Gold medal – first place	2022 Anadia	Under-23 road race
Gold medal – first place	2022 Anadia	Under-23 time trial

Shirin van Anrooij (born 5 February 2002) is a Dutch professional racing cyclist, who currently rides for UCI Women's WorldTeam Lidl–Trek. and UCI Cyclo-Cross Pro Team Baloise Trek Lions. She is the current under 23 UCI Cyclo-cross World Champion.

== History ==
Shirin van Anrooij started out riding cyclo-cross in the 2010s, winning the junior race at the 2020 UCI Cyclo-cross World Championships, as well as the National Junior Championship. In November 2022, she won her first race in the UCI Cyclo-cross World Cup, surprising the "Big Two" Fem Van Empel and Puck Pieterse to form what is now often referred to by commentators as "The Big Three". She came third overall in the 2022–2023 World Cup season. In February 2023, van Anrooij became the under 23 Cyclo-cross world champion.

On the road, van Anrooij joined the Lidl–Trek team in 2020 as a stagiaire. In 2022, she took the young rider classification at the 2022 Tour de France Femmes, and won the time trial at the Dutch National Under-23 Championships. At the 2022 UCI World Under-23 Championships in Wollongong, Australia, she took a silver medal.

In 2023, van Anrooij won her first major road race, winning the Trofeo Alfredo Binda - Comune di Cittiglio. In 2024, van Anrooij won the youth classification of the UCI Women's World Tour for the third year in a row.

== Major results ==
=== Cyclo-cross ===
2018–2019
3rd Contern
2019–2020
1st UCI World Junior Championships
1st National Junior Championships
1st Contern
1st Pétange
2nd Mol
3rd UEC European Junior Championships
DVV Trophy

3rd Lille

Rectavit Series

3rd Neerpelt

3rd Gullegem
2020–2021
5th UEC European Under-23 Championships
2021–2022
1st UEC European Under-23 Championships
1st Gullegem
1st Iowa City
Ethias Cross

2nd Beringen

2nd UCI World Under-23 Championships
2nd National Under-23 Championships
X²O Badkamers Trophy

2nd Hamme
3rd Loenhout

UCI World Cup

4th Koksijde
5th Dendermonde

2022–2023
1st UCI World Under-23 Championships
3rd Overall UCI World Cup

1st Beekse Bergen
1st Gavere
1st Zonhoven
3rd Maasmechelen
3rd Overijse
3rd Hulst
3rd Antwerpen
3rd Benidorm

X²O Badkamers Trophy

1st Koksijde
2nd Hamme
3rd Koppenberg

Exact Cross

1st Mol
1st Loenhout

2nd Ardooie
3rd UEC European Under-23 Championships
Superprestige

3rd Boom

2023–2024
1st Waterloo
Exact Cross

2nd Mol
3rd Beringen

2025–2026
UCI World Cup

2nd Koksijde
3rd Terralba
5th Zonhoven
5th Hoogerheide

X²O Badkamers Trophy

2nd Hofstade

=== Gravel ===
2025
5th UCI World Championships
2026
2nd UEC European Championships

=== Road ===
2019
1st Time trial, UEC European Junior Championships
1st Time trial, National Junior Championships
2nd Time trial, UCI World Junior Championships
2nd Overall Watersley Ladies Challenge

1st Points classification
1st Stage 2 (ITT)

2021
4th Overall Tour de Feminin

1st Young rider classification

2022
UEC European Under-23 Championships

1st Road race
1st Time trial

1st Time trial, National Under-23 Championships
1st Young rider classification, Tour de France
1st Postnord Vårgårda WestSweden (TTT)
1st Stage 1 (TTT) Challenge by La Vuelta
2nd Time trial, UCI World Under-23 Championships
5th Omloop van het Hageland
6th Vuelta a Burgos
7th Le Samyn
9th Strade Bianche
2023
1st Trofeo Alfredo Binda
2nd Road race, UCI World Under-23 Championships
3rd Amstel Gold Race
5th Brabantse Pijl
8th Tour of Flanders
9th Dwars door Vlaanderen
2024
2nd Dwars door Vlaanderen
4th Omloop Het Nieuwsblad
5th Strade Bianche
10th Setmana Ciclista Valenciana

1st Young rider classification

2026
6th Overall Vuelta a Burgos

1st Young rider classification

9th Strade Bianche
10th Trofeo Alfredo Binda
