= 2022 UCI Cyclo-cross World Championships =

Cyclo-cross championship

- Venue: (United States) Fayetteville, AR, USA
- Date: 28–30 January 2022
- Coordinates: 36°03′38″N 94°12′19″W
- Events: 7

The 2022 UCI Cyclo-cross World Championships were held between the 28th and 30th of January 2022 in Fayetteville, Arkansas, United States. It was the second time for the cyclo-cross world championships to held outside of Europe, the first instance having been in 2013 in Louisville, Kentucky, United States.

== Medal summary ==
Event	Gold		Silver		Bronze	
Men's events
Men's elite race	Tom Pidcock (GBR)	1h 00' 36"	Lars van der Haar (NED)	+30"	Eli Iserbyt (BEL)	+32"
Men's under-23 race	Joran Wyseure (BEL)	49'21"	Emiel Verstrynge (BEL)	+13"	Thibau Nys (BEL)	+33"
Men's junior race	Jan Christen (SUI)	43' 11"	Aaron Dockx (BEL)	s.t.	Nathan Smith (GBR)	s.t.
Women's events
Women's elite race	Marianne Vos (NED)	55' 00"	Lucinda Brand (NED)	+1"	Silvia Persico (ITA)	+51"
Women's under-23 race	Puck Pieterse (NED)	46'27"	Shirin van Anrooij (NED)	s.t.	Fem van Empel (NED)	+12"
Women's junior race	Zoe Bäckstedt (GBR)	41'16"	Leonie Bentveld (NED)	+32"	Lauren Molengraaf (NED)	+57"

=== Medals table ===
* Host nation (United States)

Rank	Nation	Gold	Silver	Bronze	Total
1	Netherlands (NED)	2	4	2	8
2	Great Britain (GBR)	2	0	1	3
3	Belgium (BEL)	1	2	2	5
4	Switzerland (SUI)	1	0	0	1
5	Italy (ITA)	0	0	1	1
Totals (5 entries)		6	6	6	18

=== Mixed relay (Test event) ===
Event	First	Second	Third
Team relay	Italy; Samuele Leone; Silvia Persico; Lucia Bramati; Davide Toneatti	United States (A); Eric Brunner; Katie Clouse; Clara Honsinger; Scott Funston	Belgium; Daan Soete; Kiona Crabbé; Alicia Franck; Niels Vandeputte
