= Barbora Bukovská (cyclist) =

Czezh cyclist

Personal information
- Born: 2 November 2008 (age 17)

Cycling career
- Sport: Cycling
- Disciplines: Road; Mountain; Cyclo-cross
- Role: Rider
Medal record
Representing Czech Republic
Women's mountain bike racing
World Championships
Bronze medal – third place	2025 Crans-Montana	Junior race
Women's cyclo-cross
World Championships
Gold medal – first place	2026 Hulst	Junior race
Silver medal – second place	2025 Liévin	Junior race
European Championships
Gold medal – first place	2025 Middelkerke	Junior race
Silver medal – second place	2024 Lievin	Junior race

Barbora Bukovská (born 2 November 2008) is a Czech cyclist. She won the junior women's race at the 2025 UEC European Cyclo-cross Championships having won the silver medal the year before, and at the 2025 UCI Cyclo-cross World Championships. She was a bronze medalist in the junior race at the 2025 UCI Mountain Bike World Championships.

== Career ==
She was a silver medalist at the 2024 UEC European Cyclo-cross Championships in the women's junior race in November 2024, behind Anja Grossman of Switzerland. She was then runner-up to Lise Revol at the 2025 UCI Cyclo-cross World Championships in the junior women's race in Liévin.

In May 2025, she won the Junior World Series race in Nové Město na Moravě, part of the Mountain Bike World Cup. In July, Bukovská won the silver medal in short track at the 2025 European Mountain Bike Championships in Portugal. She was a bronze medalist in the junior cross-country olympic distance at the 2025 UCI Mountain Bike World Championships in Switzerland.

She won the junior women's race at the 2025 UEC European Cyclo-cross Championships.

== Major results ==
=== Cyclo-cross ===
2025–2026
1st UCI World Junior Championships
1st UEC European Junior Championships
1st National Junior Championships
2nd Overall HSF System Cup

1st Jicin
1st Hole Vrchy
2nd Mlada Boleslav
2nd Hlinsko

3rd Overall UCI Junior World Cup

1st Tábor
2nd Hoogerheide
3rd Benidorm
