= Amandine Fouquenet =

French cyclist (born 2001)

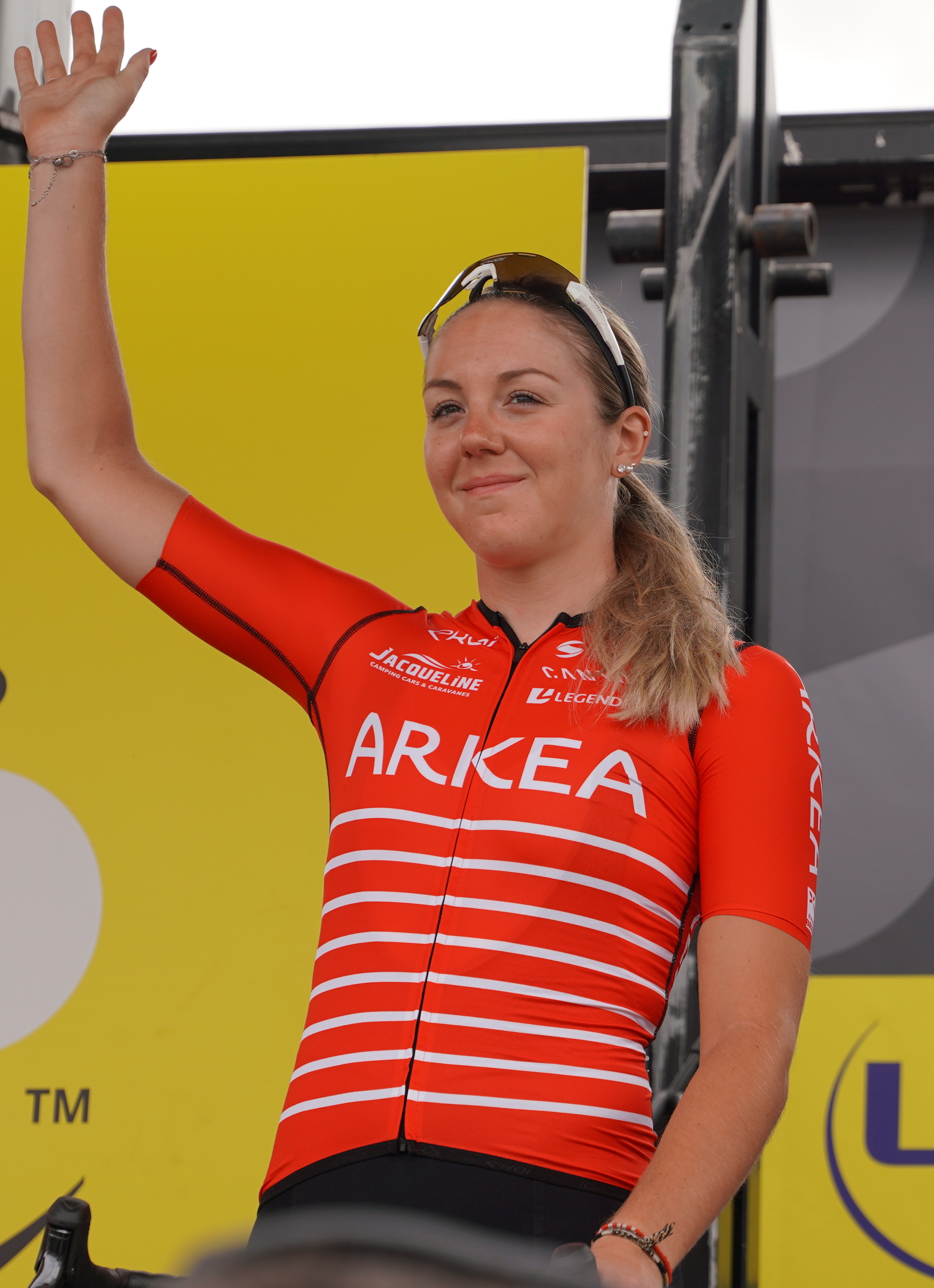
- Tour de France femmes 2022

Personal information
- Born: 19 February 2001 (age 25)

Cycling career
- Sport: Cycling
- Current team: Pauwels Sauzen–Altez Industriebouw Cycling Team
- Disciplines: Road; Cyclo-cross
- Role: Rider

Amateur teams
- 2017: UC Sud
- 2018: Team Elles Pays de la Loire
- 2019: US Vern (road)
- 2019–2020: Team Chazal–Canyon–3G Immo (cyclo-cross)

Professional teams
- 2020–2025: Arkéa Pro Cycling Team
- 2026: Pauwels Sauzen–Altez Industriebouw Cycling Team

Major wins
- Cyclo-cross National Championships (2021)

Amandine Fouquenet (born 19 February 2001) is a French professional racing cyclist, who currently rides for UCI Women's Continental Team Pauwels Sauzen–Altez Industriebouw Cycling Team. In October 2020, she rode in the women's edition of the 2020 Liège–Bastogne–Liège race in Belgium.

== Major results ==
=== Cyclo-cross ===
2018–2019
1st National Under-23 Championships
2020–2021
1st National Championships
2021–2022
3rd National Championships
5th UCI World Under-23 Championships
5th UEC European Under-23 Championships
2022–2023
4th UCI World Under-23 Championships
2023–2024
1st Overall Coupe de France

1st Quelneuc I
1st Quelneuc II
1st Albi II
1st Flamanville II
2nd Albi I
2nd Flamanville I

2nd National Championships
Swiss Cup

2nd Steinmaur

2024–2025
Coupe de France

1st Pierric I
2nd Pierric II
3rd Nommay II

5th UEC European Championships
2025–2026
2nd Overall Superprestige

1st Heusden-Zolder
1st Gullegem
1st Middelkerke
3rd Ruddervoorde

2nd National Championships
3rd Overall UCI World Cup

2nd Flamanville
3rd Namur
3rd Benidorm
3rd Maasmechelen
3rd Hoogerheide
4th Zonhoven

Exact Cross

3rd Maldegem

5th UCI World Championships
5th UEC European Championships
2026–2027
X²O Trophy

3rd Hamme–Zogge
