= 2023 UCI Cyclo-cross World Championships =

Cyclo-cross championship

- Venue: Hoogerheide, Netherlands
- Date: 3–5 February 2023
- Coordinates: 51°25′3″N 4°19′26″E
- Events: 7

The 2023 UCI Cyclo-cross World Championships were held between the 3rd and 5th of February 2023 in Hoogerheide, Netherlands.

== Medal summary ==
Event	Gold		Silver		Bronze	
Men's events
Men's elite race	Mathieu van der Poel (NED)	1h 07' 20"	Wout van Aert (BEL)	+0"	Eli Iserbyt (BEL)	+12"
Men's under-23 race	Thibau Nys (BEL)	50' 42"	Tibor Del Grosso (NED)	+4"	Witse Meeussen (BEL)	+4"
Men's junior race	Léo Bisiaux (FRA)	43' 48"	Senna Remijn (NED)	+11"	Yordi Corsus (BEL)	+17"
Women's events
Women's elite race	Fem van Empel (NED)	54' 42"	Puck Pieterse (NED)	+39"	Lucinda Brand (NED)	+1' 11"
Women's under-23 race	Shirin van Anrooij (NED)	45' 53"	Zoe Bäckstedt (GBR)	+33"	Kristýna Zemanová (CZE)	+1' 32"
Women's junior race	Isabella Holmgren (CAN)	42' 13"	Ava Holmgren (CAN)	+20"	Célia Gery (FRA)	+47"
Mixed events
Team relay	Netherlands; Lauren Molengraaf; Leonie Bentveld; Fem van Empel; Guus van den Eijnden; Tibor Del Grosso; Ryan Kamp	42' 05"	Great Britain; Cat Ferguson; Zoe Bäckstedt; Anna Kay; Alfie Amey; Joseph Blackmore; Thomas Mein	+ 31"	Belgium; Xaydee van Sinaey; Julie Brouwers; Marion Norbert-Riberolle; Antoine Jamin; Joran Wyseure; Laurens Sweeck	+ 33"

=== Medals table ===
* Host nation (Netherlands)

Rank	Nation	Gold	Silver	Bronze	Total
1	Netherlands (NED)*	4	3	1	8
2	Belgium (BEL)	1	1	4	6
3	Canada (CAN)	1	1	0	2
4	France (FRA)	1	0	1	2
5	Great Britain (GBR)	0	2	0	2
6	Czech Republic (CZE)	0	0	1	1
Totals (6 entries)		7	7	7	21
