= Delano Heeren =

Dutch cyclist (born 2009)

Personal information
- Born: 18 March 2009 (age 17) Sprundel, North Brabant, Netherlands

Cycling career
- Sport: Cycling
- Discipline: Cyclo-cross
- Role: Rider

Amateur team
- 2026: ACROG-Tormans
Medal record
Representing Netherlands
Men's cyclo-cross
UCI Cyclo-cross World Championships
Gold medal – first place	2026 Hulst	Junior race
Gold medal – first place	2026 Hulst	Team relay
European Championships
Silver medal – second place	2026 Zeddam	Junior race

Delano Heeren (born 18 March 2009) is a Dutch cyclist who competes in cyclo-cross. He won the junior race at the 2026 UCI Cyclo-cross World Championships in Hulst, where he was also part of the winning Dutch mixed team relay squad.

== Career ==
Heeren was interested in cycling from an early age, despite his family having no cycling background. He was mentored by former professional cyclist Bobbie Traksel, who lived near his family.

Heeren won the junior race at the 2026 UCI Cyclo-cross World Championships in dramatic fashion, going from third to first over the final two laps and passing Italian Filippo Grigolini after a crash to win.

Heeren views Mathieu van der Poel and Tom Pidcock as idols, and hopes to ride as a professional both on the road and in cyclo-cross.

== Major results ==
=== Cyclo-cross ===
2025–2026
UCI World Championships

1st Junior race
1st Team relay

Junior X²O Trophy

1st Loenhout
3rd Lille

Junior Exact Cross

1st Essen
2nd Meulebeke

1st Woerden
2nd National Junior Championships
UCI Junior World Cup

2nd Koksijde
4th Flamanville
4th Dendermonde
4th Hoogerheide
5th Benidorm

5th UEC European Junior Championships
2026–2027
2nd UEC European Junior Championships
Junior HG Cross

2nd Heerderstrand
