= Aubin Sparfel =

French cyclist

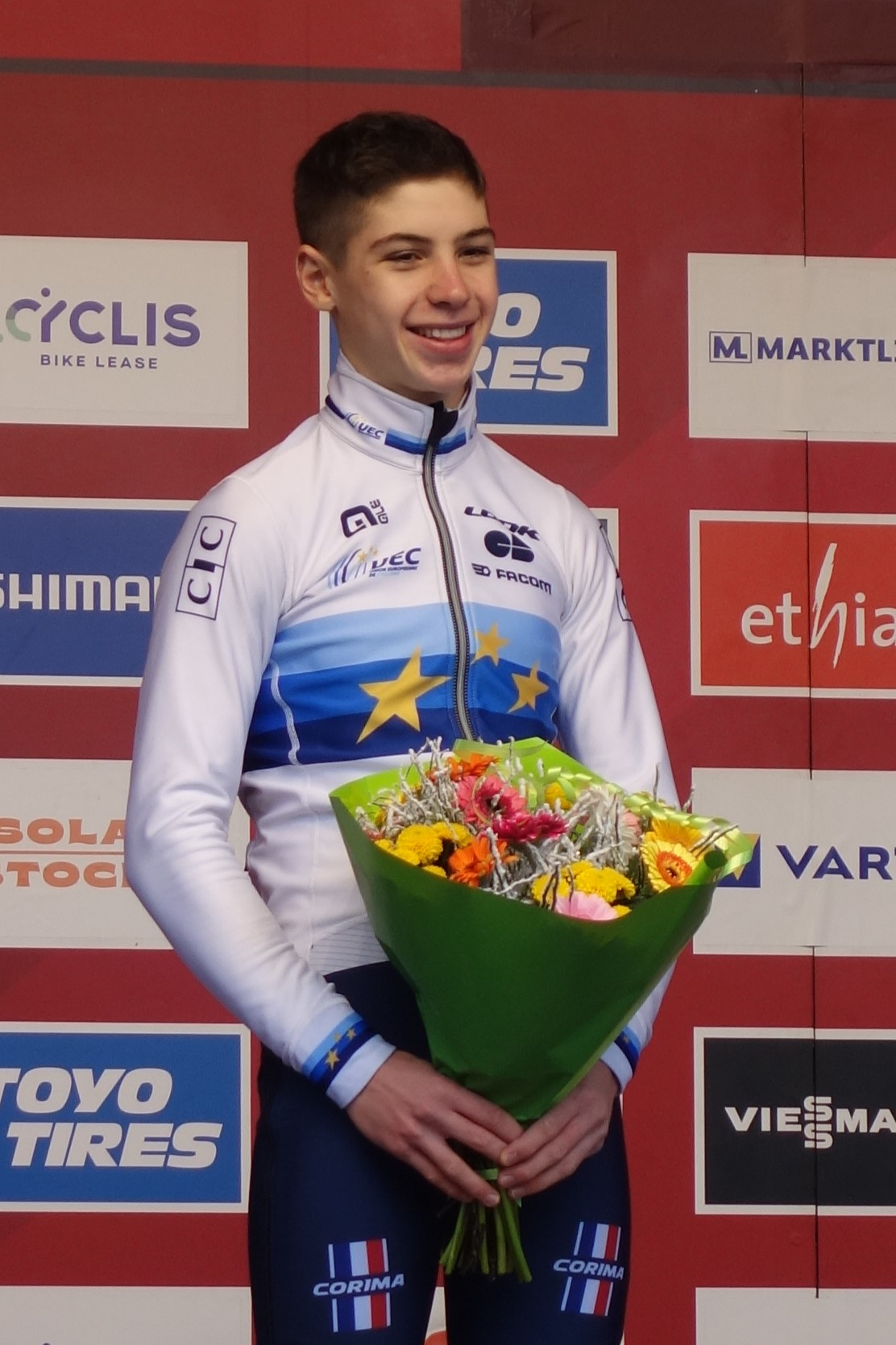
- Sparfel in 2023

Personal information
- Born: 3 May 2006 (age 20) Epinal, France
- Height: 1.76 m (5 ft 9 in)
- Weight: 59 kg (130 lb)

Cycling career
- Sport: Cycling
- Current team: Decathlon–CMA CGM Development Team
- Disciplines: Road; Cyclo-cross
- Role: Rider

Amateur team
- 2023–2024: Cycle Golbéen

Professional team
- 2025–: Decathlon–AG2R La Mondiale Development Team

Major wins
- One-day races and Classics GP de Wallonie (2026)
Medal record
Men's cyclo-cross
Representing France
World Championships
Silver medal – second place	2026 Hulst	Under-23
European Championships
Gold medal – first place	2026 Zeddam	Under-23

Aubin Sparfel (born 3 May 2006) is a French cyclo-cross and road cyclist, who rides for UCI Continental team Decathlon–CMA CGM Development Team.

== Career ==
From Vosges department, he was a member of Cycle Golbéen club. He won the junior men's race at the UEC European Cyclo-cross Championships in 2023. In February 2024, he suffered a puncture at a bad time and subsequently finished fourth in the junior race at the 2024 UCI Cyclo-cross World Championships in Hungary.

He won the French U23 Championships in 2024, and was also a bronze medal winner in the U23 race at the 2024 UEC European Cyclo-cross Championships in Spain.

In 2024, he signed with Decathlon–AG2R La Mondiale Development Team for the following season. In May 2025, he claimed his first road race win as a professional with victory at the Tour du Finistère Pays de Quimper, part of the Coupe de France de cyclisme sur route.

In January 2026, he placed second at the Under-23 race at the 2026 UCI Cyclo-cross World Championships. In September 2026, he won the 2026 Grand Prix de Wallonie ahead of Romain Grégoire and Milan Fretin. On 7 November, he won the U23 race at the 2026 UEC European Cyclo-cross Championships ahead of Giel Lejeune of Belgium.

== Major results ==
=== Cyclo-cross ===
2022–2023
1st Overall Junior Coupe de France

1st Nommay II
2nd Camors I
3rd Camors II
3rd Troyes I

1st Illnau Juniors
1st Pétange Juniors
1st Gernelle Juniors
2nd La Grandville Juniors
2023–2024
UCI World Championships

1st Team relay
4th Junior race

UEC European Championships

1st Team relay
1st Junior race

1st Overall Junior Coupe de France

1st Flamanville I
1st Flamanville II
1st Quelneuc I
1st Quelneuci II
1st Albi I
1st Albi II

1st Steinmaur Juniors
2nd Overall UCI Under-23 World Cup

1st Namur
1st Antwerpen
1st Benidorm
3rd Troyes

3rd Brumath Juniors
2024–2025
1st Overall Under-23 Coupe de France

1st Nommay I
1st Pierric I
1st Pierric II
1st Troyes I
1st Troyes II
1st La Ferté-Bernard I
1st La Ferté-Bernard II
2nd Nommay II

UEC European Championships

2nd Team relay
3rd Under-23 race

2nd National Under-23 Championships
3rd Overall UCI Under-23 World Cup

2nd Hoogerheide
3rd Besançon
3rd Benidorm

2025–2026
Under-23 X²O Badkamers Trophy

1st Koppenberg

2nd Overall UCI Under-23 World Cup

1st Flamanville
1st Hoogerheide
2nd Tábor
2nd Koksijde
4th Benidorm

2026–2027
1st UEC European Under-23 Championships
Coupe de France

1st Nommay I
1st Nommay II

Under-23 X²O Trophy

1st Koppenberg

=== Road ===
2023
1st Young rider classification, Driedaagse van Axel
2nd Trofeo Guido Dorigo
5th Overall Tour du Valromey
5th Overall Saarland Trofeo
9th Overall Eroica Juniores
2024
4th Liège–Bastogne–Liège Juniors
5th Overall Trophée Centre Morbihan
5th Classique des Alpes juniors
6th Overall Tour du Pays de Vaud

1st Stage 4

10th Paris–Roubaix Juniors
2025 (1 pro win)
1st Overall Alpes Isère Tour

1st Points classification
1st Young rider classification
1st Stage 5

1st Tour du Finistère
1st Stage 5 Tour Alsace
1st Points classification, Giro Next Gen
3rd Overall Tour de Bretagne
2026 (1)
1st Overall Tour de Bretagne

1st Points classification
1st Young rider classification
1st Stage 5

1st Grand Prix de Wallonie
1st Stage 4 Tour de l'Avenir
4th Overall Giro Next Gen

1st Stage 7

4th Road race, UCI World Under-23 Championships
6th La Roue Tourangelle
7th Giro del Belvedere
