= Aaron Dockx =

Belgian cyclist (born 2002)

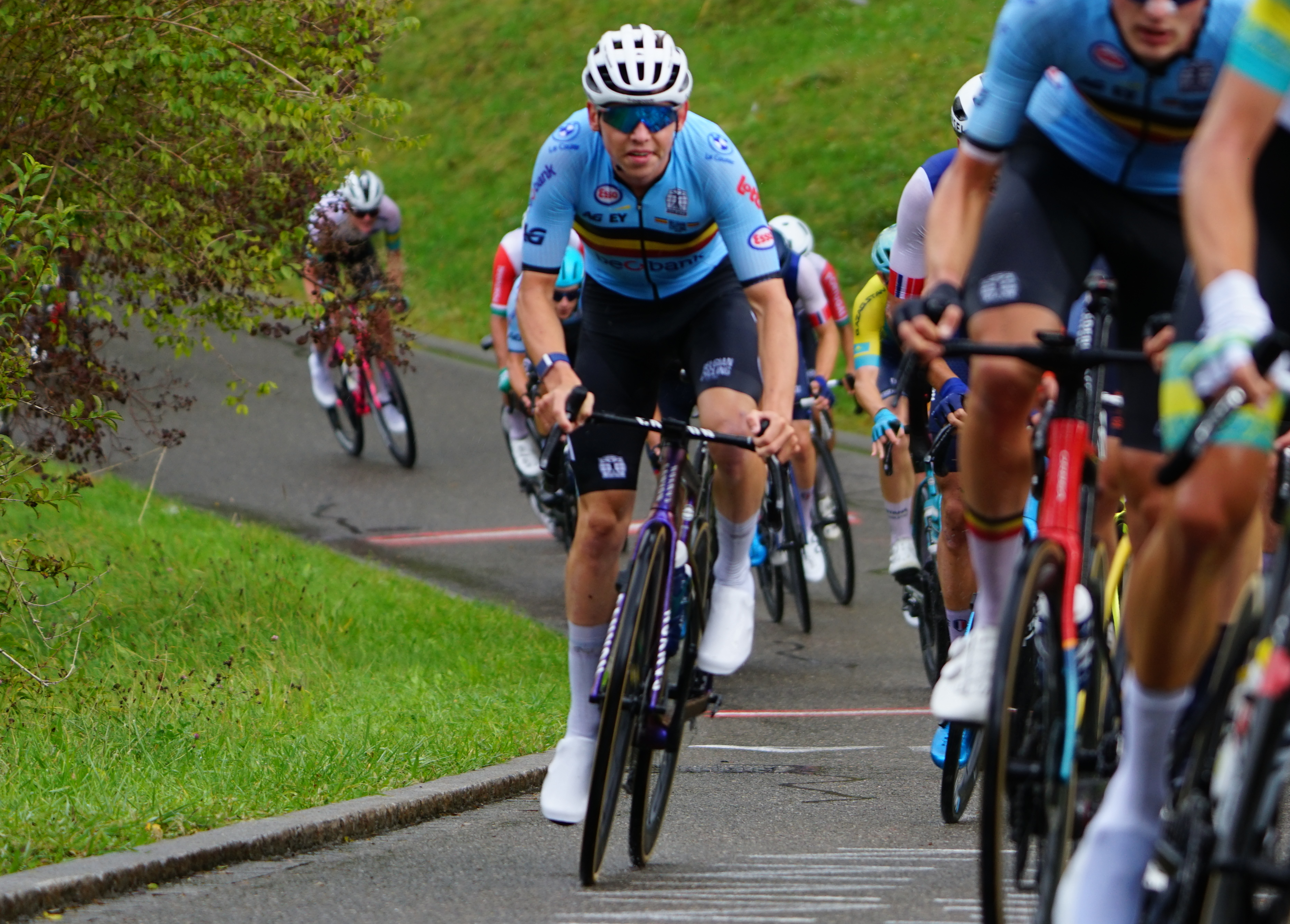
- Dockx at the 2024 UCI Road World Championships

Personal information
- Born: 28 June 2004 (age 22)
- Height: 1.73 m (5 ft 8 in)
- Weight: 56 kg (123 lb)

Cycling career
- Sport: Cycling
- Current team: Alpecin–Premier Tech
- Disciplines: Cyclo-cross; Road
- Role: Rider

Amateur team
- 2021–2022: WAC Team Hoboken

Professional teams
- 2023–2025: Alpecin–Deceuninck Development Team
- 2026–: Alpecin–Premier Tech
Medal record
Men's cyclo-cross
Representing Belgium
World Championships
Gold medal – first place	2026 Hulst	Under-23
Silver medal – second place	2024 Tábor	Under-23
European Championships
Gold medal – first place	2021 Wijster	Junior

Aaron Dockx (born 28 June 2004) is a Belgian cyclist, who currently rides UCI WorldTeam Alpecin–Premier Tech. He won the 2026 UCI Cyclo-cross Under-23 World Championships.

== Major results ==
=== Road ===
2022
7th Paris–Roubaix Juniors
2023
1st Overall Tour de Namur

1st Young rider classification
1st Points classification
1st Stages 1 & 4

9th SD WORX BW Classic
2024
2nd Overall Course de la Paix U23 – Grand Prix Jeseníky

1st Young rider classification

3rd Overall Oberösterreich Rundfahrt

1st Young rider classification
1st Stage 2

4th Overall Giro della Friuli Venezia Giulia

1st Stage 2

6th Flèche Ardennaise
9th Overall Orlen Nations Grand Prix
2025
5th Flèche Ardennaise
8th Overall Oberösterreich Rundfahrt

1st Young rider classification

8th Gent–Wevelgem U23
