= Giel Lejeune =

Belgian cyclist (born 2008)

Personal information
- Born: 23 June 2008 (age 18)

Cycling career
- Sport: Cycling
- Disciplines: Road; Cyclo-cross
- Role: Rider

Amateur teams
- 2025: GMS Cycling Team Glabbeek
- 2026: Crabbé-Dstny

Professional team
- 2026-: Alpecin–Premier Tech Development Team
Medal record
Men's cyclo-cross
Representing Belgium
World Championships
Bronze medal – third place	2026 Hulst	Junior race
European Championships
Silver medal – second place	2026 Zeddam	Under-23
Bronze medal – third place	2025 Middelkerke	Junior race

Giel Lejeune (born 23 June 2008) is a Belgian cyclist who competes in cyclo-cross. He rides for the Alpecin–Premier Tech Development Team.

== Career ==
From Rotselaar, in 2024, Lejeune won the Belgian national age-group cyclocross title in Meulebeke.

Lejeune was a bronze medallist as a junior in cyclo-cross at both the 2025 European Championships, and the junior race at the 2026 World Championships in January.

At the start of the 2026-27 season, he placed eighth at the Berencross as an 18 year-old riding for the Alpecin-Premier Tech Development Team in October 2026 in his first major cyclo-cross race among professionals. Later that month, he finished fifth at the Internationale Cyclocross Heerderstrand. On 7 November 2026, he won the silver medal in the U23 race at the 2026 UEC European Cyclo-cross Championships behind Aubin Sparfel of France.
