= Célia Gery =

French cyclist (born 2006)

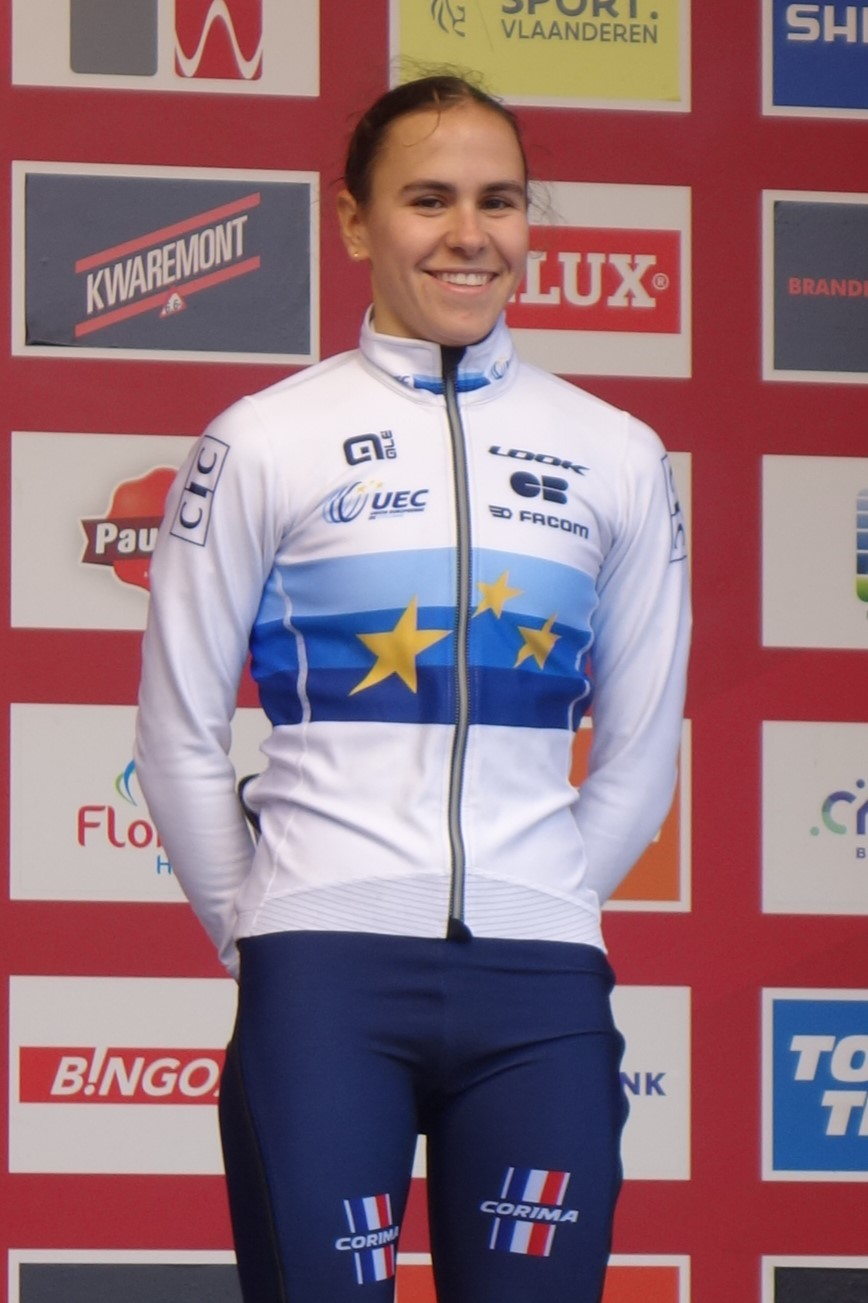
- Gery in 2023

Personal information
- Born: 6 January 2006 (age 20) Talencieux, France

Cycling career
- Sport: Cycling
- Disciplines: Cyclo-cross; Road
- Role: Rider

Professional team
- 2025–: FDJ–Suez

Major wins
- Cyclo-cross National Championships (2026) Road Major Tours Giro d'Italia 1 individual stage (2026) One-day races and Classics National Championships (2026) Brabantse Pijl (2026)
Medal record
Representing France
Women's road bicycle racing
World Championships
Gold medal – first place	2025 Kigali	Under-23 road race
European Championships
Silver medal – second place	2025 Middelkerke	Under-23
Women's cyclo-cross
World Championships
Bronze medal – third place	2026 Hulst	Under-23
European Championships
Gold medal – first place	2026 Zeddam	Under-23

Célia Gery (born 6 January 2006) is a French professional cyclo-cross and road cyclist who rides for UCI Women's WorldTeam FDJ United–Suez. She is a junior world champion, junior European, and under-23 European champion in cyclo-cross. In 2025, Géry won the first-ever standalone women's under-23 world road race title.

== Career ==
At the 2024 French Junior National Championships road race, Gery and her breakaway companion Amandine Muller were hit by a team car 31 km from the finish. Despite the crash, Gery won the race by over 3 minutes. In June 2024, Gery signed with FDJ–Suez through the 2026 season.

In 2026, Gery won her first pro race by winning Brabantse Piji in a group sprint. In June, Gery won 1st in stage 7 of the Giro d'Italia Women, outsprinting Lucinda Brand for the stage win.

At the 2026 Tour de France Femmes, Gery rode in support of team leader Demi Vollering, as well as frequently attacking in breakaways. On stage 6, she was awarded the combativity prize, finishing fifth in a small group. On Stage 8, when Vollering attacked and took the race lead from Kasia Niewiadoma-Phinney, Niewiadoma-Phinney accused Gery of intentionally blocking her during a key climb. Gery received abuse and death threats on social media following the incident.

== Major results ==
=== Cyclo-cross ===
2022–2023
1st Team relay, National Championships
3rd UCI World Junior Championships
2023–2024
UCI World Championships

1st Junior race
1st Team relay

1st Overall UCI Junior World Cup

1st Dublin
1st Namur
1st Benidorm

UEC European Championships

1st Junior race
1st Team relay

National Championships

1st Junior race
1st Team relay

1st Overall Junior Coupe de France
2024–2025
UEC European Championships

1st Under-23 race
2nd Team relay

1st National Under-23 Championships
UCI World Championships

3rd Team relay
4th Under-23 race

2025–2026
1st National Championships
Coupe de France

1st Albi I
1st Albi II

Swiss Cup

1st Schneisingen

2nd UEC European Under-23 Championships
X²O Badkamers Trophy

2nd Koppenberg

3rd UCI World Under-23 Championships
UCI World Cup

4th Benidorm

=== Road ===
2023
3rd Overall Bizkaikoloreak
3rd Tour of Flanders Juniors
7th Road race, UCI World Junior Championships
10th Overall EPZ Omloop van Borsele

1st Stage 3

10th Overall Tour du Gévaudan Occitanie
2024
National Junior Championships

1st Road race
1st Time trial
1st Team relay

1st Tour of Flanders Juniors
Watersley Ladies Challenge

1st Stages 1 & 2

2nd Overall Bizkaikoloreak
2nd Overall EPZ Omloop van Borsele
3rd Overall Tour du Gévaudan Occitanie
5th Road race, UCI World Junior Championships
2025
1st Road race, UCI World Under-23 Championships
4th Road race, National Championships
4th Pointe du Raz Ladies Classic
7th Grand Prix du Morbihan
2026 (4)
1st Road race, National Championships
1st Stage 7 Giro d'Italia
1st Brabantse Pijl
1st Grand Prix Féminin de Chambéry
7th Road race, UCI World Championships
Combativity award Stage 6 Tour de France
