= Emiel Verstrynge =

Belgian cyclist (born 2002)

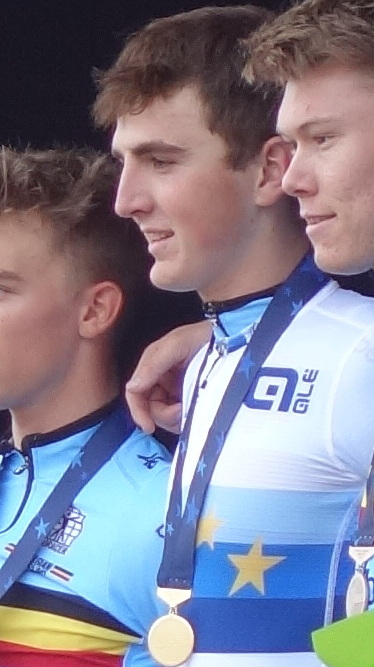
- European champion cyclo-cross in 2022

Personal information
- Born: 4 February 2002 (age 24) Adegem, East Flanders, Belgium
- Height: 1.85 m (6 ft 1 in)
- Weight: 67 kg (148 lb)

Cycling career
- Sport: Cycling
- Current team: Alpecin–Premier Tech
- Disciplines: Cyclo-cross; Road
- Role: Rider

Amateur teams
- 2019: Cycling Team Keukens Buysse
- 2021: Acrog–Tormans

Professional teams
- 2021–2022: Tormans Cyclo Cross Team
- 2022–2024: Alpecin–Fenix Development Team
- 2025–: Alpecin–Deceuninck
Medal record
Men's cyclo-cross
Representing Belgium
World Championships
Silver medal – second place	2022 Fayetteville	Under-23
Silver medal – second place	2024 Tábor	Under-23
European Championships
Gold medal – first place	2022 Namur	Under-23
Silver medal – second place	2023 Pontchâteau	Under-23

Emiel Verstrynge (born 4 February 2002) is a Belgian cyclist, who currently rides UCI WorldTeam Alpecin–Premier Tech. He won the silver medal at the 2022 UCI Cyclo-cross Under-23 World Championships.

== Major results ==
=== Cyclo-cross ===
2018–2019
Junior Brico Cross

2nd Hulst

2019–2020
1st Junior Gullegem
1st Vittel
Junior DVV Trophy

2nd Kortrijk
3rd Ronse

3rd UCI World Junior Championships
3rd National Junior Championships
UCI Junior World Cup

3rd Nommay
3rd Bern

Junior Superprestige

3rd Diegem

Junior Ethias Cross

3rd Eeklo

2020–2021
4th UCI World Under-23 Championships
2021–2022
1st National Under-23 Championships
2nd UCI World Under-23 Championships
3rd Overall UCI Under-23 World Cup

1st Flamanville
5th Dendermonde

Under-23 X²O Badkamers Trophy

3rd Loenhout

5th UEC European Under-23 Championships
2022–2023
1st UEC European Under-23 Championships
1st Bad Salzdetfurth
Under-23 X²O Badkamers Trophy

1st Kortrijk
1st Herentals
2nd Koksijde
2nd Lille

Exact Cross

2nd Essen

UCI Under-23 World Cup

3rd Tábor
3rd Benidorm
3rd Besançon

2023–2024
1st National Under-23 Championships
2nd UCI World Under-23 Championships
2nd UEC European Under-23 Championships
2nd Overall UCI Under-23 World Cup

1st Namur
1st Benidorm
2nd Dublin
3rd Antwerpen
5th Troyes

2024–2025
UCI World Cup

2nd Dendermonde
3rd Namur
5th Gavere

X²O Badkamers Trophy

3rd Baal

5th UCI World Championships
2025–2026
2nd National Championships
X²O Badkamers Trophy

2nd Baal

UCI World Cup

3rd Antwerpen
3rd Zonhoven
4th Dendermonde
5th Tábor
5th Namur
5th Gavere

Superprestige

3rd Overijse
3rd Merksplas

=== Road ===
2022
1st Overall Giro del Friuli Venezia Giulia

1st Young rider classification

2023
10th Overall Giro della Valle d'Aosta
2024
4th Liège–Bastogne–Liège Espoirs
9th Paris–Roubaix Espoirs
10th Overall Tour de Bretagne
2026
4th Liège–Bastogne–Liège
5th Amstel Gold Race
9th Coppa Agostoni

==== Grand Tour general classification results timeline ====
Grand Tour	2025
Giro d'Italia	—
Tour de France	65
Vuelta a España	—

Legend
—	Did not compete
DNF	Did not finish
