= Leonie Bentveld =

Dutch cyclist

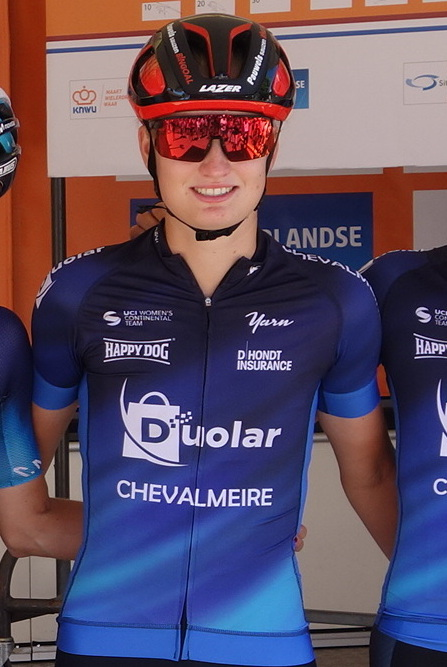
- Leonie Bentveld in 2023

Personal information
- Born: 17 April 2004 (age 22) Burgum, The Netherlands

Cycling career
- Sport: Cycling
- Current team: AG Insurance–Soudal
- Disciplines: Road; Cyclo-cross
- Role: Rider

Professional teams
- 2022–2024: Pauwels Sauzen–Altez Industriebouw Cycling Team
- 2025–: AG Insurance–Soudal
Medal record
Representing Netherlands
Women's cyclo-cross
World Championships
Gold medal – first place	2023 Hoogerheide	Team Relay
Gold medal – first place	2026 Hulst	Under-23
Gold medal – first place	2026 Hulst	Team Relay
Silver medal – second place	2022 Fayetteville	Junior
Bronze medal – third place	2024 Tábor	Under-23
Bronze medal – third place	2025 Liévin	Under-23
European Championships
Gold medal – first place	2025 Middelkerke	Under-23
Silver medal – second place	2021 Wijster	Junior
Bronze medal – third place	2024 Pontevedra	Under-23

Leonie Bentveld (born 17 April 2004) is a Dutch professional racing cyclist, who currently rides for UCI Women's WorldTeam AG Insurance–Soudal.

== Major results ==
=== Cyclo-cross ===
2021–2022
1st National Junior Championships
1st Overall UCI Junior World Cup

1st Flamanville
2nd Tábor
2nd Namur
2nd Dendermonde

Junior X²O Badkamers Trophy

1st Loenhout
1st Baal
1st Herentals

2nd UCI World Junior Championships
2nd UEC European Junior Championships
Junior Superprestige

2nd Gieten

2022–2023
1st Team relay, UCI World Championships
1st National Under-23 Championships
1st Brumath
3rd Oisterwijk
3rd Mechelen
2023–2024
1st Overall UCI Under-23 World Cup
1st National Under-23 Championships
Exact Cross

2nd Maldegem

2nd Brumath
3rd UCI World Under-23 Championships
3rd Mechelen
4th UEC European Under-23 Championships
5th Overall UCI World Cup

3rd Flamanville

2024–2025
1st Brumath
2nd Rucphen
3rd UCI World Under-23 Championships
3rd UEC European Under-23 Championships
3rd Mechelen
2025–2026
1st UCI World Under-23 Championships
1st UEC European Under-23 Championships
1st Brumath
Exact Cross

3rd Heerderstrand

UCI World Cup

4th Tábor
4th Terralba
5th Flamanville
