= Lise Revol =

French cyclist

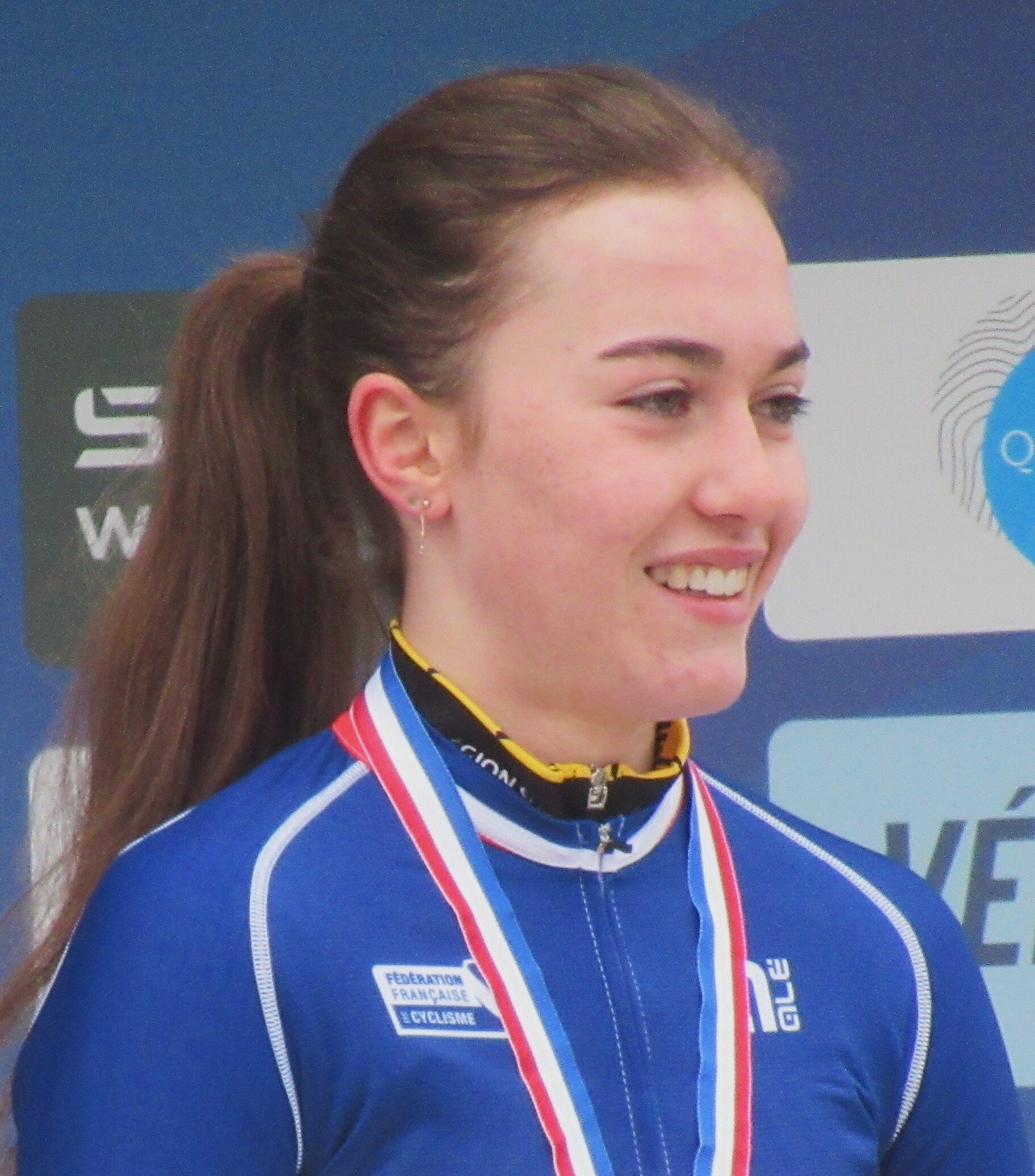
- Revol in 2024

Personal information
- Born: 3 June 2008 (age 18)

Cycling career
- Sport: Cycling
- Disciplines: Road; Mountain; Cyclo-cross
- Role: Rider

Amateur teams
- AC Beaumes-de-Venise
- Gordes Vélo Evasion club
- AS Bike Racing Rixheim
Medal record
Representing France
Women's mountain bike racing
World Championships
| Gold medal – first place | 2025 Crans-Montana | Team relay |
Women's cyclo-cross
World Championships
| Gold medal – first place | 2025 Liévin | Junior race |
| Silver medal – second place | 2026 Hulst | Junior race |

Lise Revol (born 3 June 2008) is a French cyclist. She won the women's junior race at the 2025 UCI Cyclo-cross World Championships and was a gold medalist in the mixed team relay at the 2025 UCI Mountain Bike World Championships.

== Early life ==
From Jonquerettes, in the Vaucluse department, she had already started in athletics when she was six years-old she joined her old brother in entering the Bollène cyclocross race, which she then won.

== Career ==
Previously a member of the Gordes Vélo Evasion club and AC Beaumes-de-Venise, Revol also rode for AS Bike Racing Rixheim from the summer of 2024. In May 2024, she became the French national road cycling champion in Altkirch for the under-17 age group, her seventh national age-group title across road racing, cyclo-cross and mountain biking.

In December 2024, she won her first junior Cyclo-cross World Cup race, as a 16 year-old, in Besançon. Revol won the women's junior race at the 2025 UCI Cyclo-cross World Championships in Liévin, her first year in the junior category.

In August 2025, she was runner-up in both the junior time trial and the junior road race at the French Championships. In September 2025, she won a gold medal with the French team at the 2025 UCI Mountain Bike World Championships, alongside Loana Lecomte, Joshua Dubau, Olivia Onesti, Adrien Boichis, and Lucas Teste, in Crans-Montana, Switzerland. She placed twenty second overall in the junior women’s time trial at the 2025 World Road Racing Championships in Kigali, but suffering from ill health, had to withdraw from the road race.
