= Kristýna Zemanová =

Czech cyclist (born 2003)

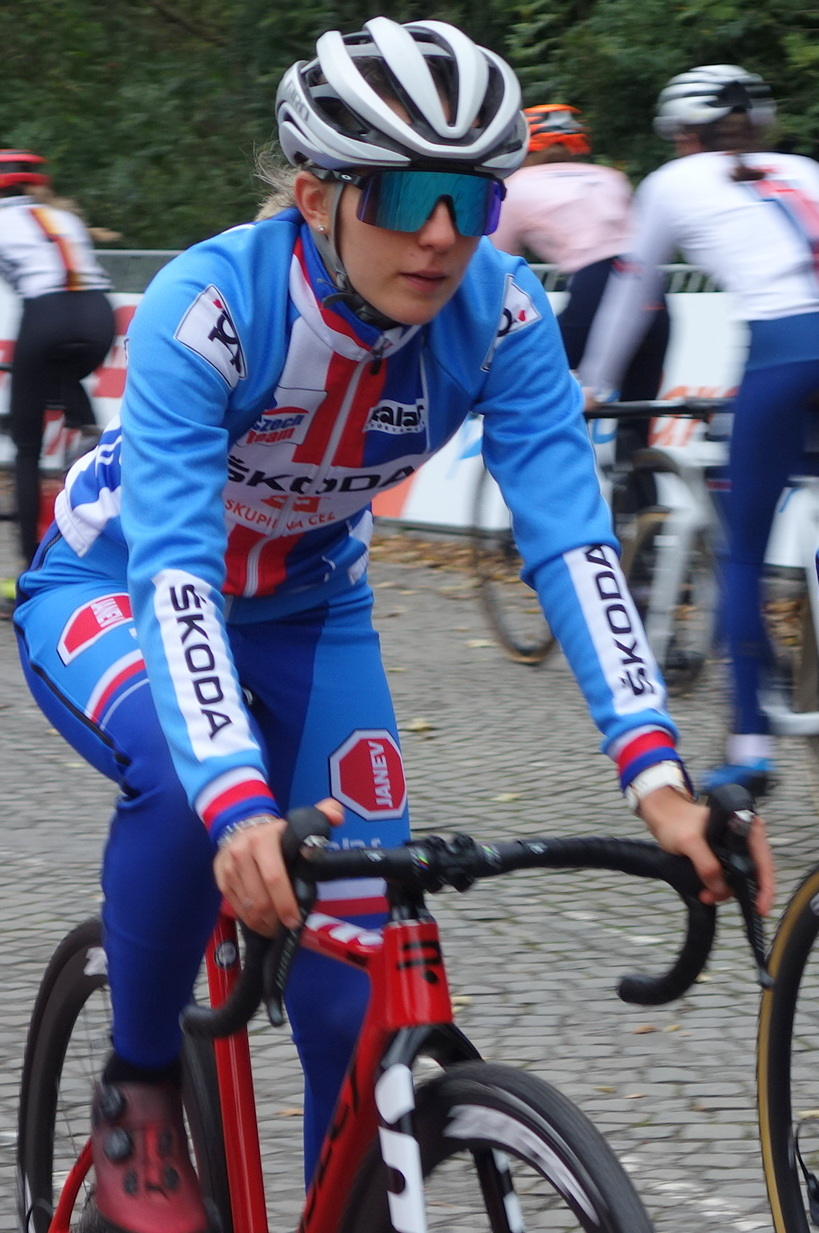
- Zemanová in 2022

Personal information
- Born: 27 October 2003 (age 22) Mladá Boleslav, Czech Republic

Cycling career
- Sport: Cycling
- Discipline: Cyclo-cross

Amateur team
- 2023–2024: Brilon Racing Team MB

Professional team
- 2025–: VIF Cycling Team
Medal record
Representing Czech Republic
Women's cyclo-cross
UCI Cyclo-cross World Championships
Silver medal – second place	2024 Tabor	Under-23 race
Bronze medal – third place	2023 Hoogerheide	Under-23 race
UEC European Cyclo-cross Championships
Bronze medal – third place	2023 Pontchâteau	Under-23 race

Kristýna Zemanová (born 27 October 2003) is a Czech cyclist who competes in cyclo-cross, where she is a five-time Czech national champion, from 2022 to 2026.

During 2025, Zemanová struggled with Long COVID, which made her consider quitting cycling. In January 2026, Zemanová recorded her best UCI World Cup result with second place in Hoogerheide, finished behind Amandine Fouquenet. Later that month, at the 2026 UCI Cyclo-cross World Championships, Zemanová was involved in a crash with Belgian rider Marion Norbert-Riberolle, who shoved Zemanová in the chest and was subsequently disqualified. Zemanová went on to finish 11th in the race.

== Major results ==
=== Cyclo-cross ===
2019–2020
7th National Championships
2021–2022
1st National Championships
2022–2023
1st National Championships
3rd UCI World Under-23 Championships
2023–2024
1st National Championships
2nd UCI World Under-23 Championships
3rd European Under-23 Championships
2024–2025
1st National Championships
4th European Under-23 Championships
2025–2026
1st National Championships
8th Overall UCI World Cup
9th European Championships

=== Road ===
2022
3rd Road race, National Championships
2023
6th Road race, National Championships
2024
5th Road race, National Championships
2025
National Championships

3rd Road race
6th Time trial

2026
2nd Road race, National Championships
4th Lotto Thüringen Ladies Tour
