= Lauren Molengraaf =

Dutch cyclist (born 2005)

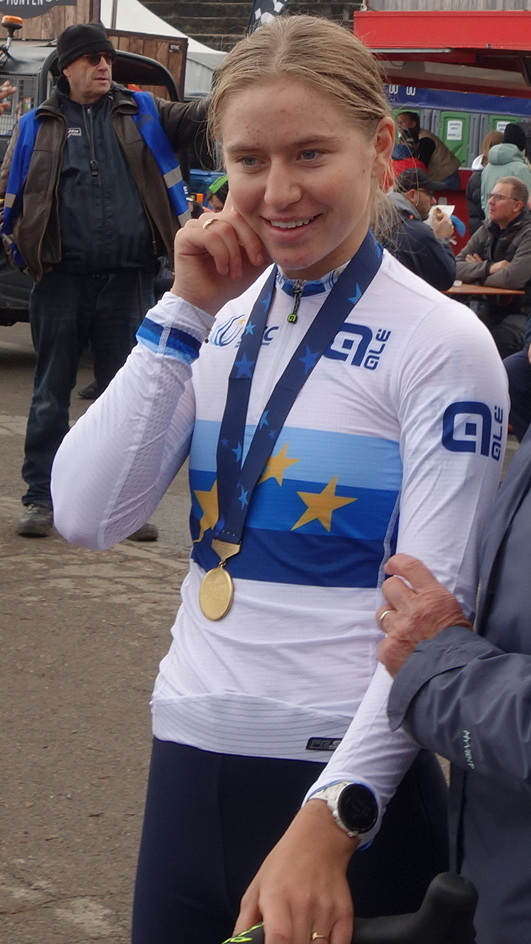
- Molengraaf in 2022

Personal information
- Born: 5 October 2005 (age 21) Capelle aan den IJssel, Netherlands
- Height: 1.65 m (5 ft 5 in)

Cycling career
- Sport: Cycling
- Current team: FDJ United–Suez
- Disciplines: Cyclo-cross; Mountain biking; Road
- Role: Rider

Professional team
- 2024–: FDJ–Suez

Lauren Molengraaf (born 5 October 2005) is a Dutch cyclist competing across road, cyclo-cross and mountain biking disciplines. She was a gold medalist at the 2023 UCI Cyclo-cross World Championships in the mixed team relay. She rides for FDJ United–Suez on the UCI Women's World Tour.

== Career ==
In September 2022, she joined thr the Intermarché Wanty Gobert Matériaux Tormans CX Team, working with Geert and Bart Wellens. She secured a victory at the junior UEC European Cyclo-cross Championships in 2022 in Namur. That year, she was a bronze medalist at the 2022 UCI Cyclo-cross World Championships. She also won the Junior World Cup title in 2023 and won the gold medal in the mixed relay with the Dutch team at the 2023 UCI Cyclo-cross World Championships. That summer, she finished sixth at the European Mountain Bike Championships tenth in the same discipline at the 2023 UCI Mountain Bike World Championships in Scotland.

In September 2023, she signed a contract with FDJ–Suez for the UCI Women's World Tour but would also allow her to continue riding in cyclocross and mountain bike racing for the teams Intermarché-Circus-Wanty and Lapierre-Mavic Unity.
