= 2026 UCI Road World Championships – Women's under-23 road race =

Cycling event

Women's under-23 road race
2026 UCI Road World Championships

Race details
- Dates: 24 September 2026
- Distance: 134 km (83 mi)
- Winning time: 3:49.10

Medalists
	Gold	(Slovakia) Viktória Chladoňová (SVK)
	Silver	(Canada) Isabella Holmgren (CAN)
	Bronze	(Belgium) Fleur Moors (BEL)

The Women's under-23 road race of the 2026 UCI Road World Championships was a cycling event that took place on 24 September 2026 in Montreal, Canada. It was the 5th edition of the championship, for which Célia Gery of France was the defending champion, having won in 2025.

== Final classification ==
Rank	Athlete	Nation	Time
1st place, gold medalist(s)	Viktória Chladoňová	Slovakia	3h 49' 10"
2nd place, silver medalist(s)	Isabella Holmgren	Canada	s.t.
3rd place, bronze medalist(s)	Fleur Moors	Belgium	+ 33"
4	Mara Winter	Switzerland	s.t.
5	Talia Appleton	Australia	s.t.
6	Lore de Schepper	Belgium	+ 39"
7	Katherine Sarkisov	United States	+ 1' 10"
8	Sidney Swierenga	Canada	+ 1' 16"
9	Justyna Czapla	Germany	s.t.
10	Mackenzie Coupland	Australia	+ 1' 46"
11	Rosita Reijnhout	Netherlands	+ 1' 47"
12	Emily Dixon	Australia	+ 1' 50"
13	Nienke Vinke	Netherlands	+ 2' 04"
14	Eleonora Ciabocco	Italy	+ 2' 05"
15	Ava Holmgren	Canada	+ 3' 40"
16	Paula Ostiz	Spain	s.t.
17	Juliana Londoño	Colombia	s.t.
18	Julie Bego	France	+ 3' 47"
19	Ema Comte	France	+ 5' 04"
20	Cat Ferguson	United Kingdom	+ 5' 40"
21	Anina Hutter	Switzerland	+ 7' 43"
22	Babette van der Wolf	Netherlands	s.t.
23	Awen Roberts	United Kingdom	s.t.
24	Emma Siegers	Belgium	s.t.
25	Amandine Muller	France	s.t.
26	Tess Moerman	Belgium	s.t.
27	Marion Bunel	France	+ 7' 45"
28	Gaia Segato	Italy	s.t.
29	Kylee Hanel	United States	+ 8' 07"
30	Oda Aune Gissinger	Norway	+ 8' 13"
31	Olympia Norrid-Mortensen	Denmark	+ 8' 15"
32	Malwina Mul	Poland	s.t.
33	Nina Andacká	Slovakia	s.t.
34	Silje Antvorskov	Estonia	+ 8' 18"
35	Sophia Sammons	Australia	+ 8' 36"
36	Barbora Nemcova	Czech Republic	+ 10' 58"
37	Giada Silo	Italy	s.t.
38	Leyre Almena	Spain	s.t.
39	Ayala Serrano	Spain	s.t.
40	Stina Kagevi	Sweden	s.t.
41	Wilma Aintila	Finland	s.t.
42	Imogen Wolff	Great Britain	s.t.
43	Felicity Wilson-Haffenden	Australia	s.t.
44	Abigail Miller	Great Britain	s.t.
45	Sofia Ungerová	Slovakia	s.t.
46	Celia Torres	Spain	s.t.
47	Liv Wenzel	Luxembourg	s.t.
48	Tabea Huys	Austria	s.t.
49	Morven Yeoman	Great Britain	s.t.
50	Titia Ryo	France	s.t.
51	Joelle Amelie Messemer	Germany	s.t.
52	Alexandra Volstad	Canada	s.t.
53	Laura Lizette Sander	Estonia	+ 13' 32"
54	Lea Huber	Switzerland	s.t.
55	Alyssa Sarkisov	United States	+ 14' 07"
56	Nadia Hartman	Poland	s.t.
57	Gwen Nothum	Luxembourg	s.t.
58	Elisabeth Ebras	Estonia	+ 14' 51"
59	Clara Jäger	Germany	s.t.
60	Florencia Monsalvez	Chile	s.t.
61	Mayte Zamudio	Mexico	s.t.
62	Adar Shriki	Israel	s.t.
63	Kiara Lylyk	Canada	+ 17' 16"
64	Elizaveta Bor	Individual Neutral Athletes	s.t.

Rank	Athlete	Nation	Time
	Xu Xiaoyan	China	DNF
	Eliška Kvasničková	Slovakia	DNF
	Marlen Rojas	Chile	DNF
	Delfina Dibella	Argentina	DNF
	Rena Tanaka	Japan	DNF
	Tsige Kiros	Ethiopia	DNF
	Angie Londoño	Colombia	DNF
	Camilla Rånes Bye	Norway	DNF
	Wang Shengning	China	DNF
	Milana Ushakova	Ukraine	DNF
	Magdalena Leis	Germany	DNF
	Lidia Cusack	United States	DNF
	Mia Aseltine	United States	DNF
	Natalia Garzón	Colombia	DNF
	Tully Schweitzer	Australia	DNF
	Maja Tracka	Poland	DNF
	Urszula Sipko	Poland	DNF
	Anastasiya Samsonova	Individual Neutral Athletes	DNF
	Dong Haixin	China	DNF
	Jazilla Mwamikazi	Rwanda	DNF
	Mariate Byukusenge	Rwanda	DNF
	Laura Choma	Poland	DNF
	Liliya Ismagilova	Individual Neutral Athletes	DNF
	Alena Bogadnova	Individual Neutral Athletes	DNF
	Gissel Borbon	Mexico	DNF
	Wang Tingting	China	DNF
	Raquel Dias	Portugal	DNF
	Valeriya Koviazina	Individual Neutral Athletes	DNF
	Viktoriya Polzunova	Uzbekistan	DNF
	Febe Jooris	Belgium	DNF
	Natalie Revelo	Ecuador	DNF
	Irati Aranguren	Spain	DNF
	Ida Ayu Manik Laksmi Dewi	Indonesia	DNF
	Nihayatuzzain Asshofi	Indonesia	DNF
	Shafa Al Zahra	Indonesia	DNF
	Sara Torrico	Bolivia	DNF
	Atzi Reyes	Mexico	DNF
	Georgette Vignonfodo	Benin	DNF
	Abril Capdevila	Argentina	DNF
	Camille Chasteau de Balyon	Mauritius	DNF
	Ayana Mizutani	Japan	DNF
	Andrea Vasquez	Guatemala	DNF
	Melsey Perez	Dominican Republic	DNF
	Jazmin Puac	Guatemala	DNF
	Zhao Qing	China	DNF
	Mieraf Aregawi	Ethiopia	DNF
	Megan Arens	Netherlands	DNF
	Mebrhit Girmay	Ethiopia	DNF
	Julia Kopecký	Czech Republic	DNS
