= 2026 UCI Road World Championships – Women's under-23 time trial =

Cycling event

Women's under-23 time trial
2026 UCI Road World Championships

Race details
- Dates: 21 September 2026
- Distance: 20.3 km (12.6 mi)
- Winning time: 27:40.72

Medalists
	Gold	(Australia) Felicity Wilson-Haffenden (AUS)
	Silver	(Netherlands) Nienke Vinke (NED)
	Bronze	(Belgium) Luca Vierstraete (BEL)

The Women's under-23 time trial of the 2026 UCI Road World Championships was a cycling event that took place on 21 September 2026 in Montreal, Canada. It was the 33nd edition of the championship, for which Zoe Backstedt of Great Britain was the defending champion, having won in 2026.

== Final classification ==
Rank	Athlete	Nation	Time	Time Gap
1st place, gold medalist(s)	Felicity Wilson-Haffenden	Australia	27:40.72	–
2nd place, silver medalist(s)	Nienke Vinke	Netherlands	28:09.19	+ 28.47
3rd place, bronze medalist(s)	Luca Vierstraete	Belgium	28:25.79	+ 45.07
4	Viktória Chladoňová	Slovakia	28:26.68	+ 45.96
5	Mackenzie Coupland	Australia	28:27.71	+ 46.99
6	Ava Holmgren	Canada	28:42.00	+ 1:01.28
7	Febe Jooris	Belgium	28:48.32	+ 1:07.60
8	Oda Aune Gissinger	Norway	28:49.83	+ 1:09.11
9	Megan Arens	Netherlands	28:51.05	+ 1:10.33
10	Justyna Czapla	Germany	28:52.19	+ 1:11.47
11	Tabea Huys	Austria	28:54.80	+ 1:14.08
12	Paula Ostiz	Spain	28:57.95	+ 1:17.23
13	Silje Weitze Antvorskov	Denmark	28:58.14	+ 1:17.42
14	Amandine Muller	France	29:08.56	+ 1:27.84
15	Wilma Aintila	Finland	29:10.76	+ 1:30.04
16	Laura Lizette Sander	Estonia	29:11.86	+ 1:31.14
17	Julia Kopecký	Czech Republic	29:15.12	+ 1:34.40
18	Mara Winter	Switzerland	29:17.13	+ 1:36.41
19	Sidney Swierenga	Canada	29:17.59	+ 1:36.87
20	Eliška Kvasnicová	Czech Republic	29:28.52	+ 1:47.80
21	Kylee Hanel	United States	29:30.11	+ 1:49.39
22	Gwen Nothum	Luxembourg	29:31.66	+ 1:50.94
23	Magdalena Leis	Germany	29:33.07	+ 1:52.35
24	Sophia Sammons	Australia	29:38.90	+ 1:58.18
25	Nadia Hartmann	Poland	29:47.17	+ 2:06.45
26	Milana Ushakova	Ukraine	29:53.51	+ 2:12.79
27	Maja Tracka	Poland	29:57.16	+ 2:16.44
28	Liv Wenzel	Luxembourg	29:58.99	+ 2:18.27
29	Olympia Norrid-Mortensen	Denmark	30:10.38	+ 2:29.66
30	Sofia Ungerová	Slovakia	30:22.56	+ 2:41.84
31	Natalia Garzón	Colombia	30:22.95	+ 2:42.23
32	Delfina Dibella	Argentina	30:25.72	+ 2:45.00
33	Lidia Cusack	United States	30:42.27	+ 3:01.55
34	Elisabeth Ebras	Estonia	30:47.41	+ 3:06.69
35	Celia Torres Arias	Spain	30:51.86	+ 3:11.14
36	Angie Londoño	Colombia	30:54.27	+ 3:13.55
37	Natalie Revelo	Ecuador	31:05.66	+ 3:24.94
38	Dong Haixin	China	31:22.99	+ 3:42.27
39	Jazilla Mwamikazi	Rwanda	31:23.33	+ 3:42.61
40	Marlen Rojas	Chile	31:23.42	+ 3:42.70
41	Florencia Monsalvez	Chile	31:28.51	+ 3:47.79
42	Tsige Kiros	Ethiopia	31:52.88	+ 4:12.16
43	Mariate Byukusenge	Rwanda	33:00.32	+ 5:19.60
44	Zhao Qing	China	33:03.19	+ 5:22.47
45	Shafa Al Zahra	Indonesia	33:05.11	+ 5:24.39
46	Rena Tanaka	Japan	33:07.19	+ 5:26.47
47	Camille Chasteau de Balyon	Mauritius	33:23.85	+ 5:43.13
48	Mieraf Aregawi	Ethiopia	33:49.02	+ 6:08.30
49	Ayana Mizutani	Japan	33:49.84	+ 6:09.12
50	Georgette Vignonfodo	Benin	33:57.30	+ 6:16.58
51	Nihayatuzzain Asshofi	Indonesia	34:17.86	+ 6:37.14
52	Jazmin Puac	Guatemala	34:52.25	+ 7:11.53
