= 2025 UCI Road World Championships – Women's junior road race =

Cycling event

Women's junior road race
2025 UCI Road World Championships

Race details
- Dates: 27 September 2025
- Distance: 74.0 km (46.0 mi)
- Winning time: 2:09:19

Medalists
	Gold	(Spain) Paula Ostiz (ESP)
	Silver	(Italy) Chantal Pegolo (ITA)
	Bronze	(Switzerland) Anja Grossmann (SUI)

The women's junior road race of the 2025 UCI Road World Championships was a cycling event that took place on 27 September 2025 in Kigali, Rwanda. It was the 38th edition of the championship. The race was won by Paula Ostiz of Spain.

The course consisted of five laps of a 15.1 km (9.4 mi) circuit in Kigali, for a total distance of 74.0 km (46.0 mi) with 1,520 m (4,990 ft) of elevation gain. Of the 72 riders entered, representing 34 nations, 57 finished the race.

== Race summary ==
The event was described as a "race of attrition" by Cyclingnews.com, as the peloton shrank to just 15 riders with 16 kilometres (9.9 mi) to go, but without significant attacks from the favorites. The peloton came to the bottom of the final climb with Great Britain pacing, eventually thinning to a group of five riders. After an attack by Canada's Sidney Swierenga with 500 meters left, Spain's Paula Ostiz started her sprint and won ahead of Italy's Chantal Pegolo by a comfortable margin.

== Final classification ==
Rank	Position in the road race
Time	Time taken to complete the road race
s.t.	Denotes a rider given the same time as the rider above
DNF	Denotes a rider who did not finish
DNS	Denotes a rider who did not start

Rank	Rider	Country	Time	Gap
1st place, gold medalist(s)	Paula Ostiz Taco	Spain	2:09:19	+0
2nd place, silver medalist(s)	Chantal Pegolo	Italy	s.t.	s.t.
3rd place, bronze medalist(s)	Anja Grossmann	Switzerland	s.t.	s.t.
4	Sidney Swierenga	Canada	s.t.	s.t.
5	Giada Silo	Italy	2:09:22	+3
6	Thais Poirier	France	s.t.	s.t.
7	Tsige Kiros	Ethiopia	s.t.	s.t.
8	Neve Parslow	Australia	s.t.	s.t.
9	Maria Okrucinska	Poland	s.t.	s.t.
10	Alyssa Sarkisov	United States	s.t.	s.t.
11	Laura Five	Belgium	2:09:25	+6
12	Alejandra Neira Dominguez	Spain	s.t.	s.t.
13	Tully Schweitzer	Australia	s.t.	s.t.
14	Rafaelle Carrier	Canada	2:09:36	+17
15	Liliana Edwards	United States	2:09:40	+21
16	Oda Aune Gissinger	Norway	2:09:49	+30
17	Lidia Cusack	United States	s.t.	s.t.
18	Polina Danshina	Individual Neutral Athletes	s.t.	s.t.
19	Elia Marthe	Switzerland	s.t.	s.t.
20	Megan Arens	Netherlands	2:09:57	+38
21	Eirini Papadimitriou Stampori	Greece	2:10:00	+41
22	Elena de Laurentiis	Italy	2:10:04	+45
23	Abigail Miller	Great Britain	2:10:07	+48
24	Marlen Rojas Lescot	Chile	2:10:08	+49
25	Karolina Špicarova	Czech Republic	2:10:34	+1:15
26	Hannah Gianatti	Australia	2:11:01	+1:42
27	Arabella Blackburn	Great Britain	2:11:16	+1:57
28	Gabriella McHugh	Great Britain	s.t.	s.t.
29	Roos Muller	Netherlands	s.t.	s.t.
30	Alexandra Safiri	Cyprus	2:11:26	+2:07
31	Marte Dolven	Norway	2:11:33	+2:14
32	Mabli Phillips	Great Britain	s.t.	s.t.
33	Milana Ushakova	Ukraine	s.t.	s.t.
34	Estefania Castillo Lopez	Colombia	2:12:52	+3:33
35	Leyre Almena Requena	Spain	2:13:07	+3:48
36	Irati Aranguren Carbayeda	Spain	s.t.	s.t.
37	Lilia Ismagilova	Individual Neutral Athletes	2:17:01	+7:42
38	Elodie Malois	Canada	2:17:26	+8:07
39	Mirthe Mons	Netherlands	2:17:28	+8:09
40	Alexis Jaramillo	United States	2:17:31	+8:12
41	Luciana Osorio Betancur	Colombia	2:17:35	+8:16
42	Anežka Kysilkova	Czech Republic	2:17:51	+8:32
43	Angelina Burenkova	Kazakhstan	2:18:11	+8:52
44	Maite Vitoria Coelho da Silva	Brazil	2:18:14	+8:55
45	Sanne Laurijssen	Belgium	2:19:25	+10:06
46	Antonie Cermanova	Czech Republic	2:21:33	+12:14
47	Auke de Buysser	Belgium	2:21:35	+12:16
48	Masengesho Yvonne	Rwanda	2:21:39	+12:20
49	Uwiringiyimana Liliane	Rwanda	s.t.	s.t.
50	Abigael Fortier	Canada	2:22:41	+13:22
51	Rahel Gimbato	Ethiopia	2:25:55	+16:36
52	Nahomi Jativa Martinez	Ecuador	s.t.	s.t.
53	Mariya Yelkina	Kazakhstan	2:28:24	+19:05
54	Raphaelle Houde	Canada	2:28:58	+19:39
55	Syahla Syafiah	Indonesia	2:29:50	+20:31
56	Harshita Jakhar	India	2:31:38	+22:19
57	Delsia Janse van Vuuren	Namibia	2:33:39	+24:20

Rank	Rider	Country	Time
	Erin Boothman	Great Britain	DNF
	Eva Terpin	Slovenia	DNF
	Lidia Castro de la Serna	Spain	DNF
	Osaretin Grace Godwin	Nigeria	DNF
	Errin Mackridge	South Africa	DNF
	Melvina Tankpinou Houeffa	Benin	DNF
	Rosemarie Thiel	Namibia	DNF
	Elvine Marie Rose Yameogo	Burkina Faso	DNF
	Anna Hanakova	Czech Republic	DNF
	Divine Ogbe	Nigeria	DNF
	Mercy Eragae	Kenya	DNF
	Pontso Makatile	Lesotho	DNF
	Maeva Plagniol	France	DNF
	Megan Botha	South Africa	DNF
	Lise Revol	France	DNS
