= 2025 UCI Road World Championships – Women's under-23 road race =

Cycling event

Women's under-23 road race
2025 UCI Road World Championships

Race details
- Dates: 25 September 2025
- Distance: 119.3 km (74.1 mi)
- Winning time: 3h 24' 26"

Medalists
	Gold	(France) Célia Gery (FRA)
	Silver	(Slovakia) Viktória Chladoňová (SVK)
	Bronze	(Spain) Paula Blasi (ESP)

The Women's under-23 road race of the 2025 UCI Road World Championships was a cycling event that took place on 25 September 2025 in Kigali, Rwanda.

It was the 4th edition of the championship, for which Puck Pieterse of Netherlands was the defending champion, having won in 2024. The race was held as a standalone event for the first time, having previously been run alongside the Elite women's road race. The race was won by French rider Célia Gery, after sprinting away from a small group in the uphill run to the line. Silver went to Slovakian rider Viktória Chladoňová, who finished 2 seconds behind Gery. Bronze went to Spanish rider Paula Blasi, who finished 10 seconds further back. 35 riders finished the event.

== Final classification ==
Pos.	Position in the time trial
Time	Time taken to complete the time trial
Diff	Deficit to the winner of the time trial
DNS	Denotes a rider who did not start
DNF	Denotes a rider who did not finish
DSQ	Denotes a rider who was disqualified from the race
OTL	Denotes a rider who finished outside the time limit

Rank	Rider	Country	Time
1st place, gold medalist(s)	Célia Gery	France	3h 24' 26"
2nd place, silver medalist(s)	Viktória Chladoňová	Slovakia	+ 2"
3rd place, bronze medalist(s)	Paula Blasi	Spain	+ 12"
4	Eleonora Ciabocco	Italy	s.t.
5	Marion Bunel	France	s.t.
6	Isabella Holmgren	Canada	+ 17"
7	Alena Ivanchenko	Individual Neutral Athletes	+ 20"
8	Lore de Schepper	Belgium	+ 25"
9	Talia Appleton	Australia	+ 31"
10	Linda Riedmann	Germany	+ 54"
11	Stina Kagevi	Sweden	+ 1' 22"
12	Imogen Wolff	Great Britain	+ 1' 33"
13	Tabea Huys	Austria	s.t.
14	Katherine Sarkisov	United States	s.t.
15	Elisabeth Ebras	Estonia	s.t.
16	Justyna Czapla	Germany	s.t.
17	Anastasiya Samsonova	Individual Neutral Athletes	s.t.
18	Selma Lantzsch	Germany	+ 1' 40"
19	Julia Kopecký	Czech Republic	+ 1' 44"
20	Anina Hutter	Switzerland	+ 2' 08"
21	Lea Huber	Switzerland	+ 2' 14"
22	Mackenzie Coupland	Australia	+ 2' 40"
23	Malwina Mul	Poland	s.t.
24	Millie Couzens	Great Britain	+ 2' 57"
25	Marie Schreiber	Luxembourg	+ 4' 13"
26	Barbora Němcová	Czech Republic	+ 5' 13"
27	Weronika Wąsaty	Poland	+ 7' 49"
28	Sofia Ungerová	Slovakia	s.t.
29	Julie Bego	France	+ 10' 00"
30	Tess Moerman	Belgium	+ 10' 31"
31	Karin Söderqvist	Sweden	+ 10' 50"
32	Juliana Londoño	Colombia	+ 12' 01"
33	Felicity Wilson-Haffenden	Australia	s.t.
34	Jenaya Francis	Canada	s.t.
35	Mia Aseltine	United States	+ 16' 38"

Rank	Rider	Country	Time
	Gwen Nothum	Luxembourg	DNF
	Alli Anderson	Australia	DNF
	Yelyzaveta Holod	Ukraine	DNF
	Monaliza Chneslaise	Eritrea	DNF
	Jazilla Mwamikazi	Rwanda	DNF
	Delfina Dibella	Argentina	DNF
	Violetta Kazakova	Kazakhstan	DNF
	Fariba Hashimi	Afghanistan	DNF
	Diana Smirnova	Individual Neutral Athletes	DNF
	Eilidh Shaw	Great Britain	DNF
	Laura Lizette Sander	Estonia	DNF
	Jazmine Lavergne	Canada	DNF
	Sonica Klopper	South Africa	DNF
	Claudette Nyirarukundo	Rwanda	DNF
	Flora Perkins	Great Britain	DNF
	Cat Ferguson	Great Britain	DNF
	Natalia Garzón	Colombia	DNF
	Ella Sabo	United States	DNF
	Mary Aleper	Uganda	DNF
	Nantume Miria	Uganda	DNF
	Martha Ntakirutimana	Rwanda	DNF
	Wendy Bunea	Romania	DNF
	Xaydee van Sinaey	Belgium	DNF
	Lucía Ruiz Pérez	Spain	DNF
	Zhao Qing	China	DNF
	Yelizaveta Sklyarova	Kazakhstan	DNF
	Laura Ruiz Pérez	Spain	DNF
	Charlotte Iragena	Rwanda	DNF
	Sara Nicole Torrico	Bolivia	DNF
	Valeriya Valgonen	Individual Neutral Athletes	DNF
	Charlotte Metoevi	Benin	DNF
	Alaliaa Darwish	Egypt	DNF
	Florence Nakagwa	Uganda	DNF
	Anabelle Thomas	Canada	DNF
	Mentalla Belal	Egypt	DNF
	Margret Mutuku	Kenya	DNF
	Vanette Houssou	Benin	DNF
	Alma Abroud	Tunisia	DNF
	Monique du Plessis	Namibia	DNF
	Mandiswa Fakudze	Eswatini	DNF
	Carla de Araujo	Angola	DNF
	Therese Diamela Obiloma	Cameroon	DNF
	Ainara Albert	Spain	DNF
	Grace Kaviro	Kenya	DNF
	Asnath Jason	Tanzania	DNF
	Dahimata Yabre	Ivory Coast	DNF
	Ava Holmgren	Canada	DNS
