= 2025 UCI Road World Championships – Women's under-23 time trial =

Cycling event

Women's under-23 time trial
2025 UCI Road World Championships

Race details
- Dates: 22 September 2025
- Distance: 31.2 km (19.4 mi)
- Winning time: 30:56.16

Medalists
	Gold	(United Kingdom) Zoe Backstedt (GBR)
	Silver	(Slovakia) Viktória Chladoňová (SVK)
	Bronze	(Italy) Federica Venturelli (ITA)

The Women's under-23 time trial of the 2025 UCI Road World Championships was a cycling event that took place on 22 September 2025 in Kigali, Rwanda. It was the 4th edition of the championship, for which Antonia Niedermaier of Germany was the defending champion, having won in 2024.

== Final classification ==
Pos.	Position in the time trial
Time	Time taken to complete the time trial
Diff	Deficit to the winner of the time trial
DNS	Denotes a rider who did not start
DNF	Denotes a rider who did not finish
DSQ	Denotes a rider who was disqualified from the race
OTL	Denotes a rider who finished outside the time limit

Rank	Rider	Country	Time	Diff.
1st place, gold medalist(s)	Zoe Backstedt	Great Britain	30:56.13	
2nd place, silver medalist(s)	Viktória Chladoňová	Slovakia	32:47.01	+ 1:50.85
3rd place, bronze medalist(s)	Federica Venturelli	Italy	33:07.74	+ 2:11.58
4	Felicity Wilson-Haffenden	Australia	33:17.91	+ 2:21.75
5	Alena Ivanchenko	Individual Neutral Athletes	33:18.60	+ 2:22.44
6	Millie Couzens	Great Britain	33:33.74	+ 2:37.58
7	Justyna Czapla	Germany	33:43.76	+ 2:47.60
8	Alli Anderson	Australia	33:49.22	+ 2:53.06
9	Tabea Huys	Austria	33:55.68	+ 2:59.52
10	Ava Holmgren	Canada	34:01.92	+ 3:05.76
11	Lore de Schepper	Belgium	34:04.56	+ 3:08.40
12	Paula Blasi Carol	Spain	34:10.57	+ 3:14.41
13	Stina Kagevi	Sweden	34:17.32	+ 3:21.16
14	Marie Schreiber	Luxembourg	34:25.48	+ 3:29.32
15	Elisabeth Ebras	Estonia	34:35.06	+ 3:38.90
16	Malwin Mul	Poland	35:05.80	+ 4:09.64
17	Gwen Nothum	Luxembourg	35:06.40	+ 4:10.24
18	Julie Bego	France	35:11.14	+ 4:14.33
19	Fleur Moors	Belgium	35:16.71	+ 4:20.55
20	Anastasiya Samsonova	Individual Neutral Athletes	35:28.39	+ 4:32.23
21	Laura Sander	Estonia	35:37.89	+ 4:41.73
22	Julia Kopecký	Czech Republic	35:41.03	+ 4:44.87
23	Fariba Hashimi	Afghanistan	35:59.61	+ 5:03.45
24	Sofia Ungerova	Slovakia	36:09.34	+ 5:13.18
25	Jazmine Lavergne	Canada	36:11.82	+ 5:15.66
26	Delfina Dibella	Argentina	36:16.62	+ 5:20.46
27	Martha Ntakirutimana	Rwanda	36:27.39	+ 5:31.23
28	Zhao Qing	China	36:37.91	+ 5:41.75
29	Linda Riedmann	Germany	36:39.23	+ 5:43.07
30	Yelizaveta Sklyarova	Kazakhstan	37:05.42	+ 6:09.26
31	Violetta Kazakova	Kazakhstan	37:08.27	+ 6:12.11
32	Claudette Nyirarukundo	Rwanda	37:14.33	+ 6:18.17
33	Mia Aseltine	United States	37:19.85	+ 6:23.69
34	Sonica Klopper	South Africa	37:14.33	+ 6:28.85
35	Yelyzaveta Holod	Ukraine	38:25.21	+ 7:29.05
36	Mary Aleper	Uganda	39:08.65	+ 8:12.49
37	Nantume Miria	Uganda	40:03.49	+ 9:07.33
38	Alaliaa Darwish	Egypt	40:56.94	+ 10:00.78
39	Charlotte Metoevi	Benin	42:10.85	+ 11:14.69
40	Vanette Houssou	Benin	43:32.78	+ 12:36.62
41	Mentalla Belal	Egypt	45:11.34	+ 14:15.18
42	Mandiswa Fakudze	Eswatini	45:42.41	+ 14:46.25
43	Alma Abroud	Tunisia	46:14.18	+ 15:18.02
44	Carla de Araujo	Angola	47:21.43	+ 16:25.27
45	Therese Diamela Obiloma	Cameroon	48:07.59	+ 17:11.43
	Natalia Garzón	Colombia	DNF	
	Asnath Jason	Tanzania	DNF	
	Monique du Plessis	Namibia	DNS	
	Dahimata Yabre	Ivory Coast	DNS	
	Abra Nomessi	Togo	DNS	
