= 2022–23 UCI Cyclo-cross World Cup =

Bicycle racing competition

Details
- Location: Belgium; Czech Republic; France; Ireland; Italy; Netherlands; Spain; United States
- Races: 14

Champions
- Male individual champion: Laurens Sweeck (BEL) (Pauwels Sauzen–Bingoal)
- Female individual champion: Fem van Empel (NED) (Team Jumbo–Visma)

The 2022–23 Telenet UCI Cyclo-cross World Cup was a season-long cyclo-cross competition, organized by the Union Cycliste Internationale (UCI). The UCI Cyclo-cross World Cup took place between 9 October 2022 and 29 January 2023. This season the number of races was expanded to 14, whereas in regular seasons most recently only about 9 were organized.

The defending champions were Eli Iserbyt in the men's competition and Lucinda Brand in the women's competition, they were succeeded respectively by Laurens Sweeck and Fem van Empel, who both clinched the overall victory following the penultimate race, held in Benidorm

== Points distribution ==
Points were awarded to all eligible riders at each race. From this season, the points awarded are according to the same scale for all categories, but only the top 25 riders receive points rather than the top 50. The top ten finishers received points according to the following table:

Points awarded
| Position | 1 | 2 | 3 | 4 | 5 | 6 | 7 | 8 | 9 | 10 |
| Elite riders | 40 | 30 | 25 | 22 | 21 | 20 | 19 | 18 | 17 | 16 |

- Riders finishing in positions 11 to 25 also received points, going down from 15 points for 11th place by one point per place to 1 point for 25th place.
- Note that the points given here are entirely different from the UCI ranking points, which are distributed according to a different scale and determine starting order in races, but have no impact on World Cup standings.

== Events ==
| Date | Race | Location | Winners | | | | |
| Date | Race | Location | Elite men | Elite women | Under-23 men | Junior men | Junior women |
|---|---|---|---|---|---|---|---|
| 9 October 2022 | World Cup Waterloo | Waterloo, United States | Eli Iserbyt (BEL) | Fem van Empel (NED) | No under-23 or junior races | | |
| 16 October 2022 | Cyclo-cross Fayetteville | Fayetteville, United States | Eli Iserbyt (BEL) | Fem van Empel (NED) | No under-23 or junior races | | |
| 23 October 2022 | Cyklokros Tábor | Tábor, Czech Republic | Eli Iserbyt (BEL) | Fem van Empel (NED) | Thibau Nys (BEL) | Léo Bisiaux (FRA) | Lauren Molengraaf (NED) |
| 30 October 2022 | Cyclo-cross Maasmechelen | Maasmechelen, Belgium | Laurens Sweeck (BEL) | Fem van Empel (NED) | Thibau Nys (BEL) | Guus van den Einden (NED) | Lauren Molengraaf (NED) |
| 13 November 2022 | Cyclo-cross Beekse Bergen | Hilvarenbeek, Netherlands | Laurens Sweeck (BEL) | Shirin van Anrooij (NED) | No under-23 or junior races | | |
| 20 November 2022 | Vlaamse Druivencross | Overijse, Belgium | Michael Vanthourenhout (BEL) | Puck Pieterse (NED) | No under-23 or junior races | | |
| 27 November 2022 | Vestingcross | Hulst, Netherlands | Mathieu van der Poel (NED) | Puck Pieterse (NED) | No under-23 or junior races | | |
| 4 December 2022 | Scheldecross | Antwerp, Belgium | Mathieu van der Poel (NED) | Fem van Empel (NED) | No under-23 or junior races | | |
| 11 December 2022 | Cyclo-cross Dublin | (Republic of Ireland) Dublin, Ireland | Wout van Aert (BEL) | Fem van Empel (NED) | No under-23 or junior races | | |
| 17 December 2022 | Cyclo-cross Val di Sole | Val di Sole, Italy | Michael Vanthourenhout (BEL) | Puck Pieterse (NED) | No under-23 or junior races | | |
| 26 December 2022 | Cyclo-cross Gavere | Gavere, Belgium | Mathieu van der Poel (NED) | Shirin van Anrooij (NED) | No under-23 or junior races | | |
| 8 January 2023 | Cyclo-cross Zonhoven | Zonhoven, Belgium | Wout van Aert (BEL) | Shirin van Anrooij (NED) | Thibau Nys (BEL) | Léo Bisiaux (FRA) | Lauren Molengraaf (NED) |
| 22 January 2023 | Cyclo-cross Benidorm | Benidorm, Spain | Mathieu van der Poel (NED) | Fem van Empel (NED) | Thibau Nys (BEL) | Yordi Corsus (BEL) | Lauren Molengraaf (NED) |
| 29 January 2023 | Cyclo-cross Besançon | Besançon, France | Mathieu van der Poel (NED) | Puck Pieterse (NED) | Tibor Del Grosso (NED) | Seppe Van Den Boer (BEL) | Ava Holmgren (CAN) |

== Points standings ==
Key
| Colour | Result |
|---|---|
| Gold | Winner |
| Silver | 2nd place |
| Bronze | 3rd place |
| Green | Other points position |
| Blue | Other classified position |
| Blue | Not classified, finished (NC) |
| Purple | Not classified, retired (Ret) |
| Red | Took part in U23 race (U23) |
| Red | Took part in Junior race (J) |
| White | Did not start (DNS) |

=== Elite men ===
| Pos. | Rider | WAT (United States) | FAY (United States) | TAB (Czech Republic) | MAA (Belgium) | BEE (Netherlands) | OVE (Belgium) | HUL (Netherlands) | ANT (Belgium) | DUB (Republic of Ireland) | VdS (Italy) | GAV (Belgium) | ZON (Belgium) | BEN (Spain) | BES (France) | Total Points |
|---|---|---|---|---|---|---|---|---|---|---|---|---|---|---|---|---|
| 1 | (Belgium) Laurens Sweeck | 2 | 2 | 4 | 1 | 1 | 4 | 2 | 4 | 2 | 4 | 6 | 3 | 4 | 2 | 385 |
| 2 | (Belgium) Michael Vanthourenhout | 4 | 3 | 3 | 4 | 3 | 1 | 6 | 3 | 5 | 1 | 4 | 4 | DNS | DNS | 309 |
| 3 | (Belgium) Eli Iserbyt | 1 | 1 | 1 | 3 | 5 | 7 | 3 | 6 | 7 | Ret | DNS | DNS | 3 | 10 | 290 |
| 4 | (Netherlands) Lars van der Haar | 3 | DNS | 2 | 2 | 2 | 3 | 4 | 5 | 4 | DNS | 5 | 6 | 7 | DNS | 265 |
| 5 | (Belgium) Niels Vandeputte | 8 | 7 | 7 | 5 | 7 | 15 | 11 | 9 | 17 | 2 | 13 | 7 | 8 | 5 | 249 |
| 6 | (Netherlands) Mathieu van der Poel | DNS | DNS | DNS | DNS | DNS | DNS | 1 | 1 | DNS | 8 | 1 | 2 | 1 | 1 | 248 |
| 7 | (Switzerland) Kevin Kuhn | DNS | DNS | 8 | 6 | 15 | 10 | 10 | 13 | 11 | 3 | 21 | 9 | 6 | 7 | 195 |
| 8 | (Belgium) Toon Vandebosch | 17 | 9 | 20 | 9 | 11 | 12 | 9 | 23 | 14 | 13 | 8 | 17 | 11 | 13 | 178 |
| 9 | (Belgium) Wout van Aert | DNS | DNS | DNS | DNS | DNS | DNS | DNS | 2 | 1 | DNS | 2 | 1 | 2 | DNS | 170 |
| 10 | (Belgium) Jens Adams | DNS | DNS | 6 | 8 | 10 | 9 | 8 | 7 | 6 | 28 | 12 | 8 | Ret | DNS | 160 |
| 11 | (Netherlands) Joris Nieuwenhuis | DNS | DNS | DNS | 11 | 4 | 5 | 5 | DNS | 12 | DNS | 17 | 12 | 14 | 3 | 153 |
| 12 | (Belgium) Vincent Baestaens | 13 | 13 | 25 | 18 | 9 | 16 | 14 | 21 | 19 | 6 | Ret | 23 | 13 | 12 | 136 |
| 13 | (United Kingdom) Tom Pidcock | DNS | DNS | DNS | DNS | DNS | 2 | Ret | 8 | 3 | DNS | 3 | DNS | 5 | DNS | 119 |
| 14 | (Switzerland) Timon Rüegg | 9 | 11 | 19 | 19 | 17 | DNS | 21 | DNS | DNS | 5 | DNS | 14 | 15 | 20 | 110 |
| 15 | (Czech Republic) Michael Boroš | 14 | 10 | 9 | 14 | 24 | 24 | 15 | 22 | DNS | DNS | 34 | 16 | 22 | 9 | 107 |
| 16 | (Spain) Felipe Orts | DNS | DNS | 16 | 12 | 6 | 18 | 7 | 24 | DNS | DNS | 24 | 13 | 9 | 29 | 105 |
| 17 | (Netherlands) Ryan Kamp | DNS | DNS | 11 | 10 | 8 | 11 | Ret | 11 | DNS | DNS | DNS | DNS | DNS | 6 | 99 |
| 18 | (Netherlands) Pim Ronhaar | 6 | 19 | U23 | U23 | 20 | 8 | Ret | DNS | 8 | 7 | 18 | Ret | DNS | Ret | 96 |
| 19 | (Netherlands) Corné van Kessel | DNS | DNS | DNS | DNS | 25 | 28 | 18 | 20 | 9 | 10 | 16 | 10 | 27 | 11 | 89 |
| 20 | (Belgium) Daan Soete | 7 | 6 | 12 | 13 | 19 | Ret | 23 | 26 | DNS | DNS | DNS | 19 | DNS | DNS | 83 |
| 21 | (Belgium) Thibau Nys | 5 | 5 | U23 | U23 | 36 | 6 | DNS | 25 | DNS | DNS | 7 | U23 | U23 | DNS | 82 |
| 22 | (Belgium) Thijs Aerts | 21 | 12 | 10 | 28 | DNS | 22 | 24 | DNS | 15 | 9 | DNS | DNS | 17 | 23 | 81 |
| 23 | (Netherlands) Mees Hendrikx | DNS | DNS | 15 | 24 | 12 | 20 | 13 | 19 | DNS | DNS | Ret | 21 | 19 | 17 | 74 |
| 24 | (Belgium) Gerben Kuypers | DNS | DNS | DNS | DNS | 13 | DNS | DNS | DNS | DNS | DNS | 10 | 18 | 10 | 8 | 71 |
| 25 | (France) David Menut | 10 | 18 | DNS | 22 | 16 | 21 | 19 | 27 | DNS | 23 | 14 | 26 | 20 | 28 | 71 |
| 26 | (Belgium) Quinten Hermans | DNS | DNS | 5 | 7 | DNS | DNS | DNS | DNS | DNS | DNS | DNS | 5 | DNS | DNS | 61 |
| 27 | (Belgium) Lander Loockx | 16 | 16 | DNS | 17 | 29 | 14 | 25 | DNS | 18 | 16 | DNS | DNS | DNS | DNS | 60 |
| 28 | (Belgium) Joran Wyseure | 19 | 8 | U23 | U23 | DNS | DNS | DNS | 10 | 13 | DNS | 29 | U23 | U23 | U23 | 54 |
| 29 | (Belgium) Emiel Verstrynge | DNS | DNS | U23 | U23 | DNS | 13 | 12 | 14 | DNS | DNS | 11 | U23 | U23 | U23 | 54 |
| 30 | (Spain) Kevin Suárez Fernández | DNS | DNS | 14 | 15 | DNS | DNS | 20 | 18 | DNS | DNS | 31 | 20 | 21 | 21 | 53 |
| 31 | (Belgium) Witse Meeussen | DNS | DNS | U23 | U23 | 14 | 17 | 17 | 16 | DNS | 18 | DNS | U23 | U23 | U23 | 48 |
| 32 | (United Kingdom) Thomas Mein | DNS | DNS | 18 | DNS | DNS | DNS | DNS | 17 | 16 | DNS | 20 | DNS | Ret | 16 | 43 |
| 33 | (United States) Eric Brunner | 11 | 4 | DNS | DNS | DNS | DNS | DNS | DNS | DNS | DNS | 39 | 32 | DNS | DNS | 37 |
| 34 | (France) Joshua Dubau | DNS | DNS | DNS | 16 | DNS | DNS | DNS | DNS | DNS | DNS | 37 | DNS | 12 | 14 | 36 |
| 35 | (Netherlands) David Haverdings | 24 | 20 | U23 | U23 | 18 | 25 | DNS | 15 | DNS | DNS | 19 | U23 | U23 | DNS | 35 |
| 36 | (France) Clément Venturini | DNS | DNS | DNS | DNS | DNS | DNS | DNS | DNS | DNS | DNS | DNS | 24 | 16 | 4 | 34 |
| 37 | (Netherlands) Stan Godrie | DNS | DNS | 20 | 21 | 23 | 32 | 22 | 29 | 25 | 12 | DNS | 27 | 25 | 32 | 34 |
| 38 | (United Kingdom) Cameron Mason | DNS | DNS | DNS | DNS | DNS | DNS | DNS | DNS | 10 | DNS | 9 | DNS | DNS | DNS | 33 |
| 39 | (Belgium) Tom Meeusen | 12 | 17 | DNS | DNS | 21 | DNS | DNS | DNS | DNS | DNS | DNS | DNS | DNS | DNS | 28 |
| 40 | (Belgium) Timo Kielich | DNS | DNS | DNS | DNS | DNS | DNS | DNS | DNS | DNS | DNS | DNS | 11 | 18 | 22 | 27 |
| 41 | (Netherlands) Tibor del Grosso | DNS | DNS | DNS | DNS | DNS | DNS | 16 | 12 | DNS | DNS | DNS | DNS | DNS | DNS | 24 |
| 42 | (United States) Curtis White | 15 | 14 | DNS | DNS | DNS | DNS | DNS | DNS | DNS | DNS | 27 | 31 | 29 | 26 | 23 |
| 43 | (France) Rémi Lelandais | 18 | 15 | DNS | U23 | 27 | DNS | 45 | DNS | DNS | 27 | DNS | U23 | DNS | DNS | 19 |
| 44 | (Italy) Filippo Fontana | DNS | DNS | DNS | DNS | DNS | DNS | DNS | DNS | DNS | 15 | DNS | DNS | DNS | 19 | 18 |
| 45 | (Belgium) Anton Ferdinande | DNS | DNS | 13 | 23 | DNS | DNS | DNS | DNS | DNS | DNS | DNS | DNS | DNS | DNS | 16 |
| 46 | (Belgium) Victor Van De Putte | DNS | DNS | DNS | DNS | DNS | DNS | DNS | DNS | DNS | 11 | DNS | U23 | U23 | U23 | 15 |
| 47 | (Poland) Marek Konwa | DNS | DNS | 24 | DNS | DNS | DNS | DNS | DNS | DNS | DNS | DNS | DNS | DNS | 15 | 13 |
| 48 | (Italy) Nicolas Samparisi | DNS | DNS | DNS | DNS | DNS | DNS | DNS | DNS | DNS | 14 | DNS | DNS | DNS | DNS | 12 |
| 49 | (Czech Republic) Zdeněk Štybar | DNS | DNS | 17 | DNS | DNS | DNS | DNS | DNS | DNS | DNS | DNS | Ret | 23 | DNS | 12 |
| 50 | (Netherlands) David van der Poel | DNS | DNS | DNS | DNS | DNS | DNS | DNS | DNS | DNS | DNS | DNS | 15 | DNS | 30 | 11 |
| 51 | (Belgium) Jente Michels | DNS | DNS | U23 | U23 | DNS | DNS | DNS | 30 | DNS | DNS | 15 | U23 | U23 | U23 | 11 |
| 52 | (Belgium) Gianni Vermeersch | DNS | DNS | DNS | DNS | DNS | DNS | DNS | DNS | DNS | 17 | DNS | DNS | DNS | DNS | 9 |
| 53 | (France) Tony Periou | DNS | DNS | DNS | 21 | 22 | DNS | DNS | DNS | DNS | DNS | DNS | DNS | DNS | 40 | 9 |
| 54 | (Switzerland) Loris Rouiller | DNS | DNS | DNS | DNS | DNS | DNS | DNS | DNS | DNS | DNS | 40 | DNS | DNS | 18 | 8 |
| 55 | (Germany) Marcel Meisen | DNS | DNS | DNS | 26 | DNS | 19 | 26 | DNS | DNS | 25 | DNS | 29 | DNS | 37 | 8 |
| 56 | (United States) Lance Haidet | 24 | 20 | DNS | DNS | DNS | DNS | DNS | DNS | DNS | DNS | DNS | DNS | DNS | DNS | 8 |
| 57 | (Canada) Michael van den Ham | 22 | 22 | DNS | DNS | DNS | DNS | DNS | DNS | DNS | DNS | DNS | DNS | 33 | 39 | 8 |
| 58 | (Italy) Gioele Bertolini | DNS | DNS | 23 | DNS | DNS | 27 | 33 | 28 | DNS | 26 | 23 | 30 | DNS | 24 | 8 |
| 59 | (Italy) Federico Ceolin | DNS | DNS | DNS | DNS | DNS | DNS | DNS | DNS | DNS | 19 | DNS | DNS | DNS | 41 | 7 |
| 60 | (France) Martin Groslambert | DNS | DNS | DNS | DNS | DNS | DNS | DNS | DNS | DNS | 20 | 38 | DNS | U23 | U23 | 6 |
| 61 | (Belgium) Aaron Dockx | DNS | DNS | DNS | U23 | DNS | DNS | DNS | DNS | 20 | DNS | DNS | U23 | U23 | DNS | 6 |
| 62 | (United States) Jack Spranger | 20 | DNS | DNS | DNS | DNS | DNS | DNS | DNS | DNS | DNS | 58 | DNS | DNS | DNS | 6 |
| 63 | (Czech Republic) Adam Ťoupalík | DNS | DNS | DNS | DNS | DNS | DNS | DNS | DNS | DNS | DNS | DNS | 22 | 24 | DNS | 6 |
| 64 | (France) Nathan Bommenel | DNS | DNS | U23 | U23 | DNS | 31 | 28 | DNS | DNS | 21 | 26 | U23 | U23 | U23 | 5 |
| 65 | (United Kingdom) Jenson Young | DNS | DNS | DNS | DNS | DNS | DNS | Ret | DNS | 21 | DNS | 60 | DNS | DNS | DNS | 5 |
| 66 | (France) Mickaël Crispin | DNS | DNS | DNS | DNS | DNS | DNS | 27 | DNS | 22 | DNS | 28 | 25 | 42 | 31 | 5 |
| 67 | (Switzerland) Gilles Mottiez | DNS | DNS | 27 | DNS | 28 | 23 | DNS | 31 | 27 | 24 | DNS | DNS | 36 | 47 | 5 |
| 68 | (Belgium) Tim Merlier | DNS | DNS | DNS | DNS | DNS | DNS | DNS | DNS | DNS | DNS | 22 | DNS | DNS | DNS | 4 |
| 69 | (Switzerland) Matteo Oppizzi | DNS | DNS | DNS | DNS | DNS | 35 | DNS | DNS | DNS | 22 | 47 | DNS | DNS | DNS | 4 |
| 70 | (Czech Republic) Jakub Ríman | DNS | DNS | 22 | DNS | DNS | DNS | 41 | DNS | DNS | DNS | 45 | 40 | DNS | 34 | 4 |
| 71 | (United Kingdom) Toby Barnes | DNS | DNS | DNS | DNS | DNS | DNS | DNS | DNS | 23 | DNS | 32 | DNS | DNS | DNS | 3 |
| 72 | (United States) Andrew Dillman | 27 | 23 | DNS | DNS | DNS | DNS | DNS | DNS | DNS | DNS | 48 | 35 | DNS | DNS | 3 |
| 73 | (Netherlands) Luke Verburg | DNS | DNS | DNS | DNS | 26 | 26 | 30 | 34 | 24 | DNS | DNS | DNS | DNS | DNS | 2 |
| 74 | (Germany) Lukas Herrmann | 31 | 24 | DNS | DNS | 41 | DNS | 39 | DNS | DNS | DNS | DNS | DNS | DNS | DNS | 2 |
| 75 | (France) Fabien Doubey | DNS | DNS | DNS | DNS | DNS | DNS | DNS | DNS | DNS | DNS | DNS | DNS | DNS | 25 | 1 |
| 76 | (France) Théo Thomas | DNS | DNS | DNS | DNS | DNS | DNS | 32 | DNS | DNS | 33 | 25 | DNS | DNS | DNS | 1 |
| 77 | (France) Steve Chainel | DNS | DNS | DNS | 25 | DNS | DNS | DNS | DNS | 28 | DNS | DNS | DNS | DNS | 36 | 1 |
| 78 | (United States) Marcis Shelton | 28 | 25 | DNS | DNS | DNS | DNS | DNS | DNS | DNS | DNS | 67 | U23 | DNS | DNS | 1 |
| 79 | (United States) Caleb Swartz | 25 | 31 | DNS | DNS | DNS | DNS | DNS | DNS | DNS | DNS | 50 | 34 | DNS | DNS | 1 |

=== Elite women ===
| Pos. | Rider | WAT (United States) | FAY (United States) | TAB (Czech Republic) | MAA (Belgium) | BEE (Netherlands) | OVE (Belgium) | HUL (Netherlands) | ANT (Belgium) | DUB (Republic of Ireland) | VdS (Italy) | GAV (Belgium) | ZON (Belgium) | BEN (Spain) | BES (France) | Total Points |
|---|---|---|---|---|---|---|---|---|---|---|---|---|---|---|---|---|
| 1 | (Netherlands) Fem van Empel | 1 | 1 | 1 | 1 | 2 | 2 | 2 | 1 | 1 | Ret | DNS | 3 | 1 | DNS | 395 |
| 2 | (Netherlands) Puck Pieterse | DNS | DNS | 2 | 2 | 3 | 1 | 1 | 2 | 2 | 1 | 3 | 2 | 2 | 1 | 390 |
| 3 | (Netherlands) Shirin van Anrooij | DNS | DNS | 7 | 3 | 1 | 3 | 3 | 3 | DNS | DNS | 1 | 1 | 3 | DNS | 264 |
| 4 | (Netherlands) Inge van der Heijden | 6 | 5 | 8 | 7 | 11 | 9 | 8 | 5 | 4 | DNS | 10 | 6 | 12 | 3 | 246 |
| 5 | (Netherlands) Ceylin del Carmen Alvarado | 2 | 6 | 6 | 9 | 4 | 5 | 4 | DNS | DNS | 2 | DNS | 5 | DNS | DNS | 203 |
| 6 | (Netherlands) Denise Betsema | 4 | 4 | 4 | 4 | 10 | 10 | 12 | 4 | 3 | DNS | DNS | DNS | DNS | 8 | 199 |
| 7 | (Netherlands) Lucinda Brand | 3 | 2 | DNS | DNS | 7 | 4 | 5 | DNS | DNS | DNS | 2 | 4 | 5 | DNS | 190 |
| 8 | (Luxembourg) Marie Schreiber | DNS | DNS | 10 | 12 | 8 | 15 | 11 | 9 | 5 | 6 | 17 | 16 | 15 | 6 | 182 |
| 9 | (Netherlands) Manon Bakker | 11 | 9 | DNS | 20 | 13 | 39 | 16 | 6 | 6 | 3 | 8 | DNS | 13 | 7 | 176 |
| 10 | (Netherlands) Annemarie Worst | 5 | 3 | 3 | 17 | DNS | DNS | DNS | DNS | DNS | DNS | 7 | 7 | 6 | 2 | 168 |
| 11 | (France) Hélène Clauzel | 8 | 7 | DNS | 15 | 25 | 8 | 7 | 22 | DNS | 7 | 18 | 14 | 10 | 9 | 162 |
| 12 | (Netherlands) Aniek van Alphen | DNS | DNS | 9 | 14 | 9 | 6 | 10 | 7 | DNS | DNS | 9 | 18 | 11 | 11 | 156 |
| 13 | (Hungary) Blanka Vas | DNS | DNS | 5 | 5 | 6 | DNS | DNS | 14 | DNS | 21 | 5 | 8 | 19 | 5 | 146 |
| 14 | (France) Line Burquier | DNS | DNS | 13 | 10 | DNS | 13 | 9 | 11 | DNS | DNS | 11 | 9 | 8 | 15 | 135 |
| 15 | (United States) Clara Honsinger | 7 | 8 | DNS | 8 | 15 | 7 | DNS | DNS | DNS | DNS | 6 | 21 | 38 | Ret | 110 |
| 16 | (Belgium) Laura Verdonschot | DNS | DNS | 18 | 18 | 20 | 20 | 18 | 8 | DNS | 18 | 16 | 10 | 25 | 18 | 97 |
| 17 | (United Kingdom) Zoe Bäckstedt | DNS | DNS | DNS | 22 | 22 | 11 | DNS | DNS | DNS | DNS | 4 | 17 | 7 | 4 | 95 |
| 18 | (France) Amandine Fouquenet | DNS | DNS | DNS | 11 | 17 | 12 | 17 | 13 | DNS | DNS | 13 | 22 | 17 | 17 | 95 |
| 19 | (Belgium) Marion Norbert-Riberolle | DNS | DNS | 12 | 24 | 16 | 14 | 6 | Ret | DNS | DNS | 14 | 32 | DNS | 10 | 86 |
| 20 | (Belgium) Sanne Cant | DNS | DNS | 16 | 19 | 14 | 17 | 14 | 10 | DNS | DNS | DNS | 11 | DNS | DNS | 81 |
| 21 | (Belgium) Alicia Franck | DNS | DNS | DNS | 31 | 18 | 18 | 22 | 15 | DNS | 14 | 32 | 13 | 16 | 14 | 78 |
| 22 | (Netherlands) Marianne Vos | DNS | DNS | DNS | 6 | 5 | DNS | DNS | DNS | DNS | DNS | DNS | 12 | 14 | DNS | 67 |
| 23 | (Canada) Sidney McGill | 19 | 13 | 46 | 39 | 29 | 25 | 21 | 30 | 8 | 9 | 25 | 37 | 41 | 33 | 62 |
| 24 | (Canada) Maghalie Rochette | DNS | DNS | DNS | DNS | DNS | DNS | DNS | DNS | DNS | 5 | Ret | 19 | 9 | 12 | 59 |
| 25 | (Czech Republic) Kristýna Zemanová | DNS | DNS | 14 | 13 | DNS | DNS | DNS | Ret | DNS | 10 | 26 | 25 | DNS | 13 | 55 |
| 26 | (France) Perrine Clauzel | DNS | DNS | DNS | 26 | 19 | DNS | 13 | DNS | DNS | 16 | 23 | 15 | 24 | 20 | 52 |
| 27 | (Italy) Sara Casasola | DNS | DNS | 11 | DNS | DNS | 19 | 39 | DNS | DNS | 8 | 22 | Ret | DNS | 19 | 51 |
| 28 | (Netherlands) Leonie Bentveld | DNS | DNS | 19 | 23 | 12 | 24 | 15 | 16 | DNS | DNS | DNS | 26 | DNS | DNS | 47 |
| 29 | (Italy) Silvia Persico | DNS | DNS | DNS | DNS | DNS | DNS | DNS | DNS | DNS | 4 | DNS | DNS | 4 | DNS | 44 |
| 30 | (Spain) Lucía González Blanco | DNS | DNS | 17 | 16 | DNS | DNS | 24 | 25 | DNS | DNS | 19 | 24 | 22 | 21 | 40 |
| 31 | (Belgium) Fleur Moors | DNS | DNS | J | J | DNS | DNS | DNS | 18 | 10 | 13 | DNS | J | J | J | 37 |
| 32 | (United States) Madigan Munro | 9 | DNS | DNS | DNS | DNS | DNS | DNS | DNS | DNS | DNS | 12 | 27 | DNS | 24 | 33 |
| 33 | (Netherlands) Maud Kaptheijns | 14 | 15 | 20 | 52 | 23 | DNS | Ret | 33 | DNS | DNS | DNS | DNS | DNS | DNS | 32 |
| 34 | (France) Caroline Mani | 10 | 11 | DNS | DNS | DNS | DNS | DNS | DNS | DNS | DNS | DNS | DNS | DNS | DNS | 31 |
| 35 | (United States) Austin Killips | 13 | 10 | DNS | DNS | DNS | DNS | DNS | DNS | DNS | DNS | 24 | Ret | DNS | 29 | 31 |
| 36 | (Italy) Francesca Baroni | DNS | DNS | DNS | 35 | 30 | 30 | Ret | 19 | DNS | 20 | 21 | 23 | DNS | 16 | 31 |
| 37 | (Italy) Eva Lechner | DNS | DNS | DNS | DNS | DNS | DNS | DNS | DNS | DNS | 12 | DNS | 20 | 21 | 22 | 29 |
| 38 | (United States) Raylyn Nuss | 12 | 16 | DNS | DNS | DNS | DNS | DNS | DNS | DNS | DNS | 30 | Ret | 23 | 26 | 27 |
| 39 | (United Kingdom) Anna Kay | DNS | DNS | 15 | DNS | DNS | DNS | 20 | 17 | DNS | DNS | DNS | DNS | DNS | DNS | 26 |
| 40 | (Canada) Ava Holmgren | 15 | 14 | J | J | DNS | DNS | DNS | DNS | DNS | DNS | 50 | J | J | J | 23 |
| 41 | (Germany) Judith Krahl | 24 | 12 | 21 | 30 | DNS | DNS | DNS | DNS | DNS | DNS | DNS | DNS | DNS | 34 | 21 |
| 42 | (Belgium) Kiona Crabbé | DNS | DNS | 33 | 34 | Ret | 31 | 41 | 20 | 12 | 34 | 33 | 45 | 40 | Ret | 20 |
| 43 | (France) Pauline Ferrand-Prévot | DNS | DNS | DNS | DNS | DNS | DNS | DNS | Ret | 7 | DNS | 27 | DNS | DNS | DNS | 19 |
| 44 | (United Kingdom) Millie Couzens | DNS | DNS | DNS | Ret | DNS | DNS | 25 | DNS | 9 | DNS | DNS | DNS | DNS | DNS | 18 |
| 45 | (Belgium) Jinse Peeters | DNS | DNS | 27 | 40 | 32 | 23 | 29 | 26 | 11 | 33 | 40 | DNS | 30 | 36 | 18 |
| 46 | (Belgium) Julie Brouwers | DNS | DNS | 35 | 41 | 27 | 28 | 40 | 21 | 13 | DNS | 37 | 30 | 28 | 28 | 18 |
| 47 | (United States) Taylor Kuyk-White | DNS | DNS | DNS | DNS | DNS | DNS | DNS | 41 | 15 | 19 | 34 | DNS | DNS | DNS | 18 |
| 48 | (Canada) Isabella Holmgren | 16 | 18 | J | J | DNS | DNS | DNS | DNS | DNS | DNS | 28 | J | J | J | 18 |
| 49 | (United States) Caitlin Bernstein | 17 | 19 | DNS | DNS | DNS | DNS | DNS | DNS | DNS | 24 | 49 | DNS | DNS | DNS | 18 |
| 50 | (Netherlands) Lauren Molengraaf | DNS | DNS | J | J | DNS | DNS | 23 | 12 | DNS | DNS | DNS | J | J | J | 17 |
| 51 | (Austria) Nadja Heigl | DNS | DNS | 40 | DNS | DNS | DNS | DNS | DNS | DNS | 11 | 47 | DNS | DNS | DNS | 15 |
| 52 | (Belgium) Marthe Truyen | DNS | DNS | 29 | 32 | 21 | 26 | 32 | DNS | 16 | DNS | 45 | 28 | DNS | DNS | 15 |
| 53 | (France) Lauriane Duraffourg | DNS | DNS | DNS | 25 | DNS | DNS | DNS | DNS | DNS | DNS | 20 | DNS | 18 | 27 | 15 |
| 54 | (Czech Republic) Kateřina Hladíková | DNS | DNS | 47 | 47 | DNS | DNS | 34 | 23 | DNS | 15 | DNS | 39 | Ret | 37 | 14 |
| 55 | (United Kingdom) Imogen Wolff | DNS | DNS | DNS | J | DNS | DNS | DNS | DNS | 14 | DNS | DNS | DNS | J | J | 12 |
| 56 | (France) Anaïs Morichon | DNS | DNS | DNS | 21 | DNS | DNS | 19 | DNS | DNS | DNS | DNS | Ret | DNS | DNS | 12 |
| 57 | (Netherlands) Yara Kastelijn | DNS | DNS | DNS | DNS | DNS | DNS | 37 | DNS | DNS | DNS | 15 | DNS | DNS | DNS | 11 |
| 58 | (United States) Cassidy Hickey | 21 | 20 | DNS | DNS | DNS | DNS | DNS | DNS | DNS | DNS | 60 | 58 | DNS | DNS | 11 |
| 58 | (France) Olivia Onesti | DNS | DNS | 34 | DNS | DNS | 16 | DNS | 34 | DNS | DNS | DNS | 42 | 27 | 49 | 10 |
| 60 | (Italy) Valentina Corvi | DNS | DNS | J | J | DNS | DNS | 27 | DNS | DNS | 17 | DNS | J | J | J | 9 |
| 61 | (United Kingdom) Xan Crees | DNS | DNS | 39 | 43 | 36 | 36 | Ret | 37 | 17 | 31 | DNS | DNS | DNS | DNS | 9 |
| 62 | (United States) Keira Bond | 31 | 17 | DNS | DNS | DNS | DNS | DNS | DNS | DNS | DNS | 52 | 52 | DNS | DNS | 9 |
| 63 | (Italy) Asia Zontone | DNS | DNS | 23 | 28 | DNS | DNS | DNS | DNS | DNS | DNS | DNS | 44 | 20 | 31 | 9 |
| 64 | (United States) Anna Megale | 20 | 23 | DNS | DNS | DNS | DNS | DNS | DNS | DNS | DNS | DNS | 41 | DNS | DNS | 9 |
| 65 | (United Kingdom) Cat Ferguson | DNS | DNS | DNS | J | DNS | DNS | DNS | DNS | 18 | DNS | DNS | DNS | J | J | 8 |
| 66 | (United States) Lauren Zoerner | 18 | Ret | DNS | DNS | DNS | DNS | DNS | DNS | DNS | DNS | DNS | DNS | DNS | DNS | 8 |
| 67 | (Spain) Sara Cueto Vega | DNS | DNS | DNS | DNS | DNS | DNS | 38 | 39 | 19 | 39 | 56 | Ret | 47 | DNS | 7 |
| 68 | (Czech Republic) Julia Kopecky | DNS | DNS | DNS | DNS | 31 | 21 | 33 | 24 | DNS | DNS | 29 | 40 | DNS | DNS | 7 |
| 69 | (Republic of Ireland) Maria Larkin | 33 | 33 | DNS | DNS | DNS | DNS | DNS | DNS | 20 | DNS | DNS | DNS | DNS | DNS | 6 |
| 70 | (United States) Sunny Gilbert | 25 | 21 | DNS | DNS | DNS | DNS | DNS | DNS | DNS | DNS | DNS | DNS | DNS | DNS | 6 |
| 71 | (Belgium) Suzanne Verhoeven | DNS | DNS | 26 | 48 | 24 | 22 | 28 | 28 | DNS | DNS | 53 | 31 | 39 | DNS | 6 |
| 72 | (Canada) Siobhan Kelly | 32 | 30 | DNS | DNS | DNS | DNS | DNS | DNS | 21 | DNS | 63 | 53 | DNS | DNS | 5 |
| 73 | (United States) Emily Werner | 23 | 24 | DNS | DNS | DNS | DNS | DNS | DNS | DNS | DNS | 31 | 51 | 36 | 46 | 5 |
| 74 | (Belgium) Xaydee van Sinaey | DNS | DNS | J | J | DNS | DNS | DNS | DNS | DNS | 22 | 41 | J | J | J | 4 |
| 75 | (Spain) Sara Bonillo Talens | DNS | DNS | 50 | DNS | DNS | DNS | DNS | DNS | 22 | DNS | DNS | DNS | 42 | DNS | 4 |
| 76 | (Italy) Carlotta Borello | DNS | DNS | 22 | 27 | DNS | DNS | DNS | DNS | DNS | 27 | DNS | 49 | 26 | 39 | 4 |
| 77 | (United States) Hannah Arensman | DNS | 22 | DNS | DNS | DNS | DNS | DNS | DNS | DNS | DNS | DNS | DNS | DNS | DNS | 4 |
| 78 | (United States) Lizzy Gunsalus | 22 | 27 | DNS | DNS | DNS | DNS | DNS | DNS | DNS | DNS | 39 | 29 | Ret | 32 | 4 |
| 79 | (Italy) Rebecca Gariboldi | DNS | DNS | DNS | DNS | DNS | DNS | DNS | DNS | DNS | 30 | DNS | DNS | DNS | 23 | 3 |
| 80 | (Italy) Lucia Bramati | DNS | DNS | 38 | DNS | DNS | Ret | 35 | DNS | DNS | 23 | DNS | DNS | DNS | DNS | 3 |
| 81 | (Republic of Ireland) Roisin Lally | DNS | DNS | DNS | DNS | DNS | 41 | DNS | DNS | 23 | DNS | DNS | DNS | DNS | DNS | 3 |
| 82 | (Republic of Ireland) Aine Doherty | DNS | DNS | DNS | DNS | DNS | DNS | DNS | DNS | 24 | DNS | DNS | DNS | DNS | DNS | 2 |
| 83 | (Belgium) Ellen van Loy | DNS | DNS | 24 | 29 | 28 | 32 | 36 | 27 | DNS | DNS | 46 | 43 | DNS | DNS | 2 |
| 84 | (United Kingdom) Ella MacLean-Howell | DNS | DNS | DNS | 45 | DNS | 27 | DNS | DNS | DNS | DNS | DNS | DNS | DNS | 25 | 1 |
| 85 | (Italy) Alessia Bulleri | DNS | DNS | DNS | DNS | DNS | DNS | 30 | DNS | DNS | 25 | DNS | DNS | DNS | DNS | 1 |
| 86 | (Republic of Ireland) Hannah McClorey | DNS | DNS | DNS | DNS | DNS | DNS | DNS | DNS | 25 | DNS | DNS | DNS | DNS | DNS | 1 |
| 87 | (Czech Republic) Barbora Jerábková | DNS | DNS | 25 | 55 | DNS | DNS | 26 | 40 | DNS | 26 | DNS | 46 | 32 | 35 | 1 |
| 88 | (United States) Erica Zaveta | 28 | 25 | DNS | DNS | DNS | DNS | DNS | DNS | DNS | DNS | DNS | DNS | DNS | DNS | 1 |

=== U23 men ===
This is the top 20 of 50 riders.

| Pos. | Rider | TAB (Czech Republic) | MAA (Belgium) | ZON (Belgium) | BEN (Spain) | BES (France) | Total Points |
|---|---|---|---|---|---|---|---|
| 1 | (Belgium) Thibau Nys | 1 | 1 | 1 | 1 | DNS | 160 |
| 2 | (Netherlands) Tibor del Grosso | 11 | 6 | 3 | 2 | 1 | 115 |
| 3 | (Belgium) Witse Meeussen | 15 | 3 | 2 | 5 | 2 | 106 |
| 4 | (Belgium) Jente Michels | 2 | 4 | 4 | 4 | 37 | 96 |
| 5 | (Belgium) Emiel Verstrynge | 3 | 7 | 9 | 3 | 3 | 94 |
| 6 | (Belgium) Joran Wyseure | 4 | 8 | 5 | 6 | 4 | 85 |
| 7 | (Italy) Davide Toneatti | 9 | 11 | 15 | 7 | 7 | 70 |
| 8 | (Netherlands) David Haverdings | 8 | 5 | 10 | 14 | DNS | 67 |
| 9 | (Belgium) Arne Baers | 12 | 9 | 14 | 9 | 13 | 61 |
| 10 | (Netherlands) Danny van Lierop | 10 | 22 | 13 | 16 | 6 | 59 |
| 11 | (United States) Andrew Strohmeyer | 6 | 38 | 31 | 8 | 9 | 55 |
| 12 | (Netherlands) Pim Ronhaar | 5 | 2 | DNS | DNS | DNS | 51 |
| 13 | (Switzerland) Dario Lillo | 7 | 16 | DNS | DNS | 5 | 50 |
| 14 | (France) Nathan Bommenel | 17 | 17 | 6 | 15 | 25 | 49 |
| 15 | (France) Rémi Lelandais | DNS | 12 | 16 | 21 | 12 | 43 |
| 16 | (Belgium) Aaron Dockcx | DNS | 15 | 12 | 11 | DNS | 40 |
| 17 | (Netherlands) Lucas Janssen | DNS | DNS | 20 | 12 | 10 | 36 |
| 18 | (Belgium) Ward Huybs | DNS | 10 | 8 | DNS | DNS | 34 |
| 19 | (Italy) Lorenzo Masciarelli | 13 | 13 | 18 | DNS | DNS | 34 |
| 20 | (Czech Republic) Matyáš Fiala | 16 | 23 | 28 | 13 | 18 | 34 |

=== Junior men ===
This is the top 20 of 48 riders.

| Pos. | Rider | TAB (Czech Republic) | MAA (Belgium) | ZON (Belgium) | BEN (Spain) | BES (France) | Total Points |
|---|---|---|---|---|---|---|---|
| 1 | (France) Léo Bisiaux | 1 | 2 | 1 | 7 | 52 | 129 |
| 2 | (Belgium) Yordi Corsus | 4 | DNS | 2 | 1 | 6 | 112 |
| 3 | (Belgium) Viktor Vandenberghe | 3 | 3 | 7 | 3 | 2 | 105 |
| 4 | (Belgium) Seppe van den Boer | 15 | 15 | 4 | 2 | 1 | 103 |
| 5 | (Netherlands) Guus van den Eijnden | 8 | 1 | 3 | 6 | DNS | 103 |
| 6 | (Czech Republic) Václav Jezek | 2 | 7 | 12 | 21 | 12 | 77 |
| 7 | (United States) Andrew August | 10 | 4 | Ret | 4 | 9 | 77 |
| 8 | (Netherlands) Senna Remijn | 45 | 6 | 16 | 5 | 3 | 76 |
| 9 | (Belgium) Wies Nuyens | 11 | 11 | 6 | 9 | 4 | 74 |
| 10 | (Netherlands) Floris Haverdings | 13 | 10 | 10 | 8 | Ret | 63 |
| 11 | (Slovakia) Matthias Schwarzbacher | 7 | 16 | 15 | 13 | 7 | 62 |
| 12 | (Canada) Ian Ackert | 5 | Ret | Ret | 20 | 5 | 48 |
| 13 | (Belgium) Robbe Marchand | 14 | 12 | 40 | 22 | 11 | 45 |
| 14 | (Netherlands) Mika Vijfvinkel | 12 | 9 | 34 | 25 | 16 | 42 |
| 15 | (Netherlands) Kelje Solen | 22 | 27 | 5 | 11 | 35 | 40 |
| 16 | (France) Aubin Sparfel | DNS | 18 | 11 | 10 | 29 | 39 |
| 17 | (Belgium) Antoine Jamin | DNS | 30 | 22 | 14 | 8 | 34 |
| 18 | (United States) Daniel English | DNS | DNS | 9 | DNS | 10 | 33 |
| 19 | (Hungary) Barnabás Vas | 19 | 8 | DNS | DNS | 21 | 30 |
| 20 | (Netherlands) Jelte Jochems | 18 | 5 | 44 | 32 | DNS | 29 |

=== Junior women ===
This is the top 20 of 57 riders.

| Pos. | Rider | TAB (Czech Republic) | MAA (Belgium) | ZON (Belgium) | BEN (Spain) | BES (France) | Total Points |
|---|---|---|---|---|---|---|---|
| 1 | (Netherlands) Lauren Molengraaf | 1 | 1 | 1 | 1 | DNS | 160 |
| 2 | (Canada) Ava Holmgren | 4 | 3 | 4 | 3 | 1 | 112 |
| 3 | (Canada) Isabella Holmgren | 8 | 11 | 3 | 2 | 3 | 98 |
| 4 | (France) Célia Gery | 5 | 5 | 2 | 4 | 4 | 95 |
| 5 | (Belgium) Fleur Moors | 3 | 2 | 7 | 7 | DNS | 93 |
| 6 | (Belgium) Xaydee van Sineay | 6 | 6 | 12 | 8 | 2 | 88 |
| 7 | (Italy) Valentina Corvi | 17 | 9 | 5 | 5 | 9 | 76 |
| 8 | (Belgium) Lore de Schepper | 11 | 19 | 6 | 10 | 8 | 69 |
| 9 | (Italy) Federica Venturelli | 7 | DNS | 20 | 6 | 5 | 66 |
| 10 | (United States) Vida Lopez de San Roman | 12 | 7 | 9 | DNS | 12 | 64 |
| 11 | (Czech Republic) Eliška Hanákova | 13 | 8 | 8 | 14 | 13 | 62 |
| 12 | (Netherlands) Puck Langenbarg | 15 | 16 | 16 | DNS | 11 | 46 |
| 13 | (Belgium) Shanyl de Schoesitter | 16 | 20 | 24 | 9 | 16 | 43 |
| 14 | (United Kingdom) Cat Ferguson | DNS | 4 | DNS | DNS | 6 | 42 |
| 15 | (Czech Republic) Vanda Dlasková | 10 | 23 | DNS | DNS | 10 | 35 |
| 16 | (France) Amandine Müller | 9 | 10 | Ret | DNS | DNS | 33 |
| 17 | (Slovakia) Viktória Chladoňová | 2 | DNS | DNS | DNS | DNS | 30 |
| 18 | (United Kingdom) Imogen Wolff | DNS | 15 | DNS | DNS | 7 | 30 |
| 19 | (Czech Republic) Katerina Douderová | 20 | 12 | 23 | DNS | 24 | 25 |
| 20 | (United States) Kaya Musgrave | 27 | 17 | 11 | DNS | 30 | 24 |
