= UCI Road World Championships – Junior women's road race =

UCI Road World Championships – Women's junior road race is the annual world championship race for road bicycle racing for women in the Junior category. It is organised by the world governing body, the Union Cycliste Internationale. It was first held in 1987. In 2020 no junior race was held due to the COVID-19 pandemic.

The winner of the event is entitled to wear the rainbow jersey in Junior competitions for one year.

== Medal winners ==
Championships	Gold	Silver	Bronze
1987 Bergame	Catherine Marsal (FRA)	Aiga Zagorska (URS)	Ellis Guazzaroni (ITA)
1988 Odense	Gitte Hjortflod (DEN)	Esther van Verseveld (NED)	Lotte Schmidt (DEN)
1989 Moscow	Deirdre Demet-Barry (USA)	Jessica Grieco (USA)	Elena Nechaeva (URS)
1990 Middelsborough	Ina-Yoko Teutenberg (RFA)	Jessica Grieco (USA)	Daniëlle Overgaag (NED)
1991 Colorado Springs	Elsbeth Vink (NED)	Sally Dawes (GBR)	Fabiana Luperini (ITA)
1992 Olympia	Hanka Kupfernagel (GER)	Elisabeth Chevanne-Brunel (FRA)	Marion Borst (NED)
1993 Perth	Elisabeth Chevanne-Brunel (FRA)	Cinzia Faccin (ITA)	Karine Boitier (FRA)
1994 Quito	Diana Žiliūtė (LTU)	Alla Epifanova (RUS)	Evi Gensheimer (GER)
1995 San Marino	Andrea Hänni (SUI)	Kerstin Scheitle (GER)	Lisbeth Simper (DEN)
1996 Novo Mesto	Alessandra D'Ettore (ITA)	Oksana Saprykina (UKR)	Martina Corazza (ITA)
1997 San Sebastián	Mirella Van Melis (NED)	Nicole Brändli (SUI)	Sofie Andersson (SWE)
1998 Valkenburg	Tina Liebig (GER)	Olga Zabelinskaya (RUS)	Nathalie Bates (AUS)
1999 Verona	Genevieve Jeanson (CAN)	Trixi Worrack (GER)	Noemi Cantele (ITA)
2000 Plouay	Nicole Cooke (GBR)	Magdalena Sadlecka (POL)	Clare Hall-Patch (CAN)
2001 Lisbon	Nicole Cooke (GBR)	Pleuni Möhlmann (NED)	Maja Włoszczowska (POL)
2002 Zolder	Suzanne de Goede (NED)	Claudia Stumpf (GER)	Monica Holler (SWE)
2003 Hamilton	Loes Markerink (NED)	Irina Tolmacheva (RUS)	Sabine Fischer (GER)
2004 Verona	Marianne Vos (NED)	Marta Bastianelli (ITA)	Ellen van Dijk (NED)
2005 Oberwart	Mie Bekker Lacota (DEN)	Marianne Vos (NED)	Rasa Leleivytė (LTU)
2006 Spa – Francorchamps	Rasa Leleivytė (LTU)	Marina Romoli (ITA)	Eleonora Patuzzo (ITA)
2007 Aguascalientes	Eleonora Patuzzo (ITA)	Cherise Taylor (RSA)	Valentina Scandolara (ITA)
2008 Cape Town	Jolien D'Hoore (BEL)	Rossella Callovi (ITA)	Hanna Amend (GER)
2009 Moscow	Rossella Callovi (ITA)	Pauline Ferrand-Prévot (FRA)	Susanna Zorzi (ITA)
2010 Offida	Pauline Ferrand-Prévot (FRA)	Rossella Ratto (ITA)	Coryn Rivera (USA)
2011 Copenhagen	Lucy Garner (GBR)	Jessy Druyts (BEL)	Christina Siggaard (DEN)
2012 Limburg	Lucy Garner (GBR)	Eline Gleditsch Brustad (NOR)	Anna Zita Maria Stricker (ITA)
2013 Florence	Amalie Dideriksen (DEN)	Anastasiia Iakovenko (RUS)	Olena Demydova (UKR)
2014 Ponferrada	Amalie Dideriksen (DEN)	Sofia Bertizzolo (ITA)	Agnieszka Skalniak (POL)
2015 Richmond	Chloé Dygert (USA)	Emma White (USA)	Agnieszka Skalniak (POL)
2016 Doha	Elisa Balsamo (ITA)	Skylar Schneider (USA)	Susanne Andersen (NOR)
2017 Bergen	Elena Pirrone (ITA)	Emma Norsgaard (DEN)	Letizia Paternoster (ITA)
2018 Innsbruck	Laura Stigger (AUT)	Marie Le Net (FRA)	Simone Boilard (CAN)
2019 Yorkshire	Megan Jastrab (USA)	Julie de Wilde (BEL)	Lieke Nooijen (NED)
2021 Flanders	Zoë Bäckstedt (GBR)	Kaia Schmid (USA)	Linda Riedmann (GER)
2022 Wollongong	Zoë Bäckstedt (GBR)	Eglantine Rayer (FRA)	Nienke Vinke (NED)
2023 Glasgow	Julie Bego (FRA)	Cat Ferguson (GBR)	Fleur Moors (BEL)
2024 Zurich	Cat Ferguson (GBR)	Paula Ostiz (ESP)	Viktória Chladoňová (SVK)
2025 Kigali	Paula Ostiz (ESP)	Chantal Pegolo (ITA)	Anja Grossmann (SUI)
2026 Montreal	Alejandra Neira (ESP)	Matilde Rossignoli (ITA)	Anja Grossmann (SUI)

=== Medallists by nation ===
Rank	Nation	Gold	Silver	Bronze	Total
1	Great Britain	7	2	0	9
2	Italy	5	8	9	22
3	Netherlands	5	3	5	13
4	France	4	4	1	9
5	Denmark	4	1	3	8
6	United States	3	5	1	9
7	Germany	3	3	4	10
8	Spain	2	1	0	3
9	Lithuania	2	0	1	3
10	Belgium	1	2	1	4
11	Switzerland	1	1	2	4
12	Canada	1	0	2	3
13	Austria	1	0	0	1
14	Russia	0	4	0	4
15	Poland	0	1	3	4
16	Norway	0	1	1	2
16	Soviet Union	0	1	1	2
16	Ukraine	0	1	1	2
19	South Africa	0	1	0	1
20	Sweden	0	0	2	2
21	Australia	0	0	1	1
21	Slovakia	0	0	1	1
Totals (22 entries)		39	39	39	117
