= Soblahov =

- Municipality
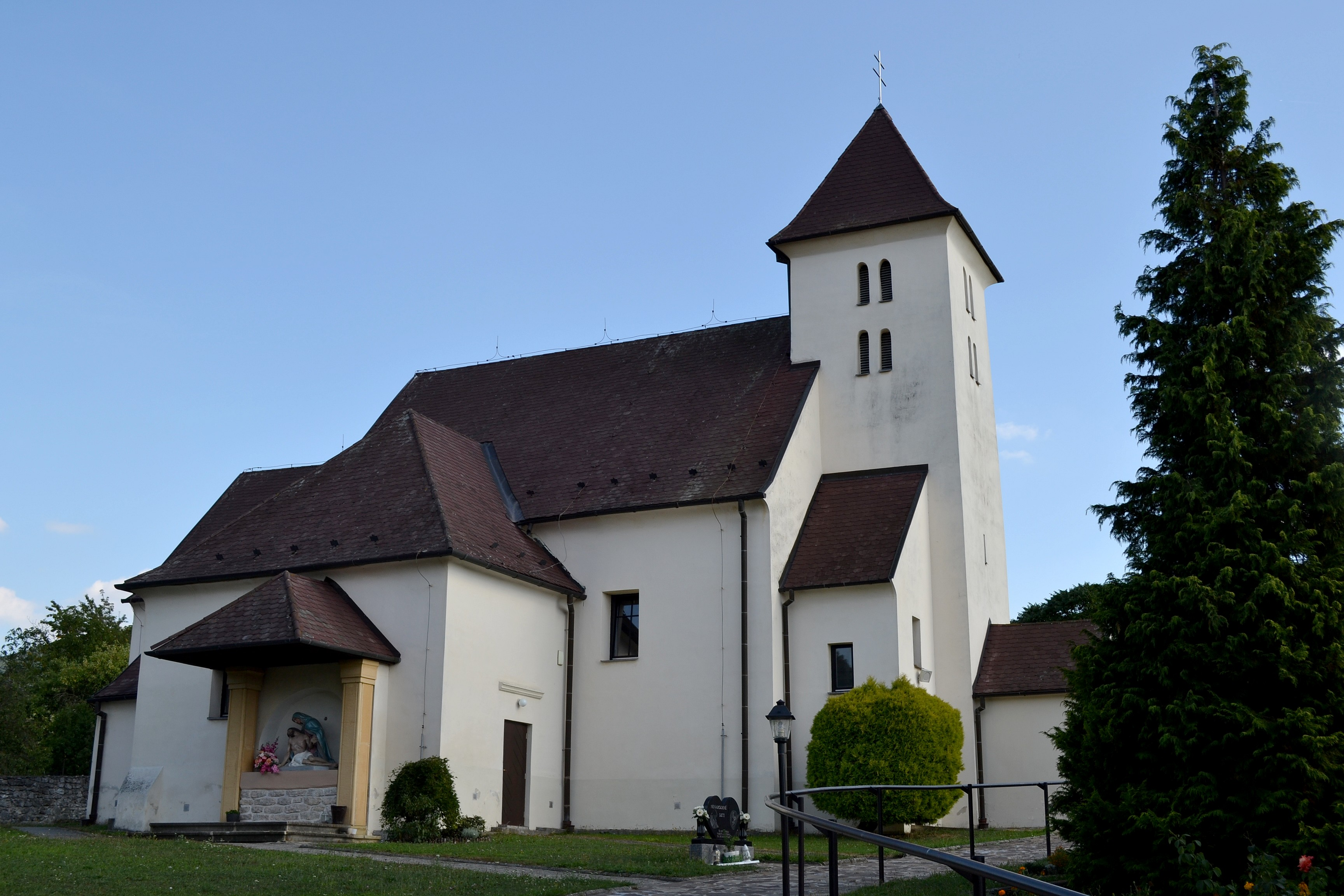

- Flag

- Location of Soblahov in the Trenčín Region Location of Soblahov in Slovakia
- Coordinates: 48.87°N 18.08°E
- Country: Slovakia
- Region: Trenčín Region
- District: Trenčín District
- First mentioned: 1332

Area
  - Total: 17.38 km^{2} (6.71 sq mi)
- Elevation: 280 m (920 ft)

Population (2025)
  - Total: 2,391
- Time zone: UTC+1 (CET)
  - Summer (DST): UTC+2 (CEST)
- Postal code: 913 38
- Area code: +421 32
- Vehicle registration plate (until 2022): TN
- Website: www.soblahov.sk

Soblahov (Hungarian: Cobolyfalu, until 1899 Szoblahó) is a village and municipality in Trenčín District in the Trenčín Region of north-western Slovakia.

== History ==
In historical records the village was first mentioned in 1393 as Sablaho.

== Geography ==
The municipality lies at an altitude of 280 metres (920 ft) and covers an area of 17.38 km^{2} (6.71 sq mi) (2025).

== Population ==
Population statistic (10 years)
Year	1995	2005	2015	2025
Count	1907	1960	2248	2391
Difference		+2.77%	+14.69%	+6.36%

Population statistic
Year	2024	2025
Count	2391	2391
Difference		+0%

It has a population of 2391 people (31 December 2025).

=== Ethnicity ===
Census 2021 (1+ %)
Ethnicity	Number	Fraction
Slovak	2355	97.79%
Not found out	29	1.2%
Total	2408	

In year 2021 was 2408 people by ethnicity 2355 as Slovak, 29 as Not found out, 18 as Czech, 9 as Other, 6 as Russian, 5 as Canadian, 3 as Hungarian, 3 as French, 2 as Romani, 2 as Austrian, 2 as German, 2 as English, 1 as Jewish, 1 as Turkish, 1 as Italian, 1 as Rusyn, 1 as Polish, 1 as Moravian and 1 as Croatian.

Note on population: The difference values of population numbers in the table "Population statistic" and in the sections "Ethnicity" & "Religion" is caused by the use of various statistical methods.

=== Religion ===
Census 2021 (1+ %)
Religion	Number	Fraction
Roman Catholic Church	1800	74.75%
None	478	19.85%
Not found out	46	1.91%
Evangelical Church	30	1.25%
Total	2408	

In year 2021 was 2408 people by religion 1800 from Roman Catholic Church, 478 from None, 46 from Not found out, 30 from Evangelical Church, 13 from Christian Congregations in Slovakia, 10 from Other, 9 from Greek Catholic Church, 7 from Jehovah's Witnesses, 7 from Ad hoc movements, 2 from Paganism and natural spirituality, 2 from Islam, 1 from Other and not ascertained christian church, 1 from Church of the Brethren, 1 from Buddhism and 1 from Baptists Church.

== Friendship commune ==
- Rudniki ( Poland )

== Notable people ==
- Viktória Chladoňová (born 2006) - race cyclist
