= UCI Road World Championships – Women's under-23 road race =

The UCI Road World Championships - Women's under-23 road race is the annual world championship for road bicycle racing for women aged 23 or under, organised by the world governing body, the Union Cycliste Internationale. The honours were first awarded in 2022. Through 2024, it has not been held as a separate race, but is based on placings of competitors below the age of 23 at the end of the preceding calendar year that participate in the women's road race. From the 2025 edition of the world championships, the under-23 women have had their own race.

== Medal winners ==
Championships	Gold	Silver	Bronze
2022 Wollongong	Niamh Fisher-Black (NZL)	Pfeiffer Georgi (GBR)	Ricarda Bauernfeind (GER)
2023 Glasgow	Blanka Vas (HUN)	Shirin van Anrooij (NED)	Anna Shackley (GBR)
2024 Zurich	Puck Pieterse (NED)	Neve Bradbury (AUS)	Antonia Niedermaier (GER)
2025 Kigali	Célia Gery (FRA)	Viktória Chladoňová (SVK)	Paula Blasi (ESP)
2026 Montreal	Viktória Chladoňová (SVK)	Isabella Holmgren (CAN)	Fleur Moors (BEL)

=== Medallists by nation ===
Rank	Nation	Gold	Silver	Bronze	Total
1	Netherlands	1	1	0	2
1	Slovakia	1	1	0	2
3	France	1	0	0	1
3	Hungary	1	0	0	1
3	New Zealand	1	0	0	1
6	Great Britain	0	1	1	2
7	Australia	0	1	0	1
7	Canada	0	1	0	1
9	Germany	0	0	2	2
10	Belgium	0	0	1	1
10	Spain	0	0	1	1
Totals (11 entries)		5	5	5	15
