= Linda Riedmann =

German cyclist

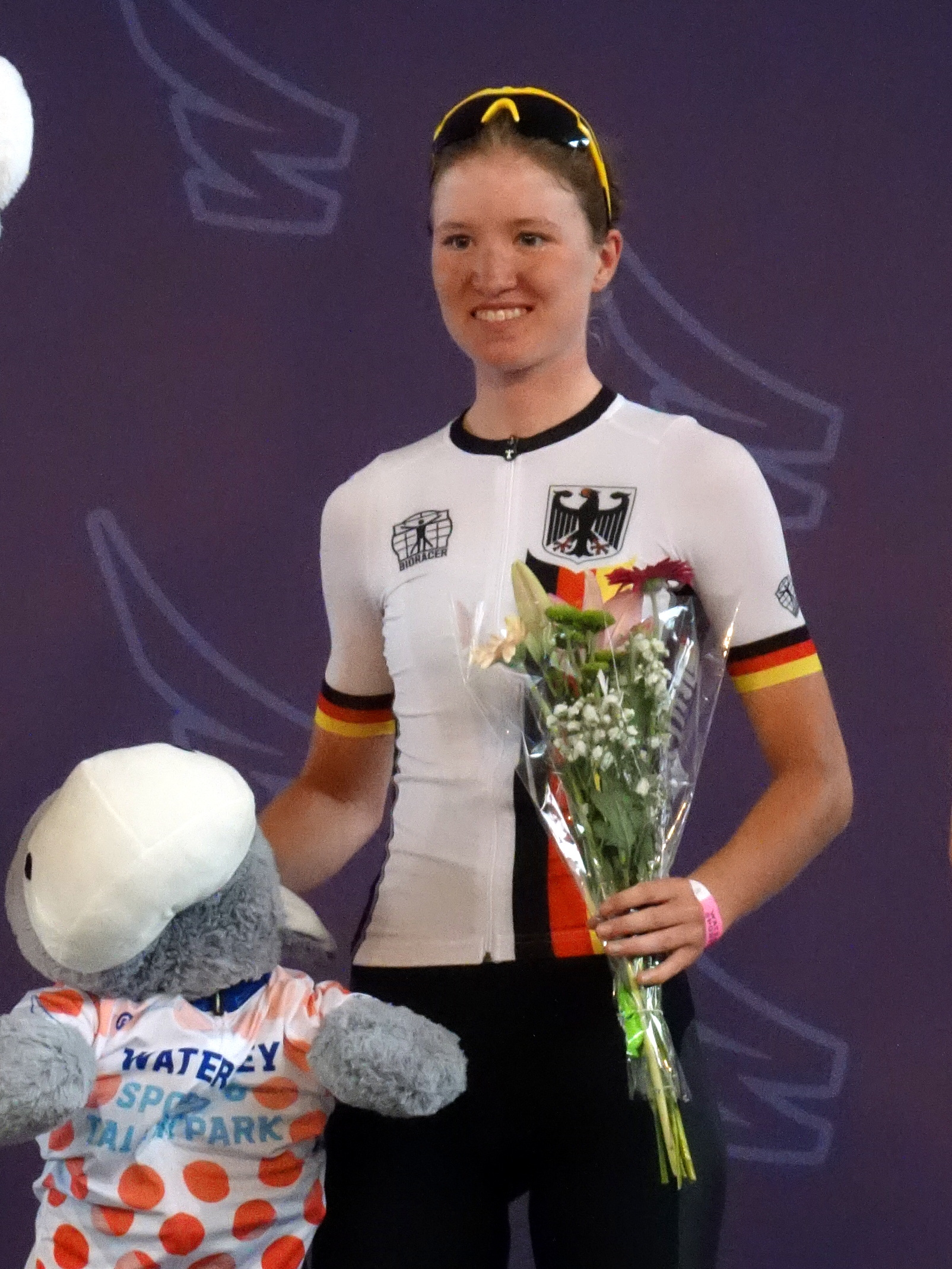
- Riedmann in 2020

Personal information
- Born: 23 March 2003 (age 23) Karbach, Bavaria, Germany

Cycling career
- Sport: Cycling
- Current team: Visma–Lease a Bike
- Discipline: Road
- Role: Rider

Professional teams
- 2022–2025: Team Jumbo–Visma
- 2026-: Lotto–Intermarché Ladies
Medal record
Representing Germany
Women's road bicycle racing
World Championships
| Bronze medal – third place | 2021 Flanders | Junior road race |
European Championships
| Gold medal – first place | 2021 Trentino | Junior road race |
| Gold medal – first place | 2022 Anadia | Under-23 team relay |

Linda Riedmann (born 23 March 2003) is a German professional racing cyclist, who currently rides for UCI Women's WorldTeam Lotto–Intermarché Ladies.

== Major results ==
2020
1st Road race, National Junior Road Championships
2021
1st Road race, UEC European Junior Road Championships
1st Road race, National Junior Road Championships
1st Overall Tour du Gévaudan Occitanie

1st Stages 1 & 2

3rd Road race, UCI Road World Junior Championships
3rd Overall Watersley Ladies Challenge

1st Stage 3

2022
UEC European Road Championships

1st Team relay
9th Under-23 time trial

National Under-23 Road Championships

2nd Time trial
3rd Road race

2023
2nd Time trial, National Under-23 Road Championships
3rd Grand Prix Stuttgart & Region
8th Road race, UCI Road World Under-23 Championships
2024
4th Road race, National Road Championships
7th Dwars door het Hageland
10th GP Oetingen
2025
1st Binche–Chimay–Binche
10th Road race, UCI Road World Under-23 Championships
