= Cycling at the 2022 European Youth Summer Olympic Festival =

- Venue: City routes of Banská Bystrica
- Date: 26–29 July 2022

Cycling at the 2022 European Youth Summer Olympic Festival was held at the City routes of Banská Bystrica in Banská Bystrica, Slovakia from 26 to 29 July 2022.

== Medal table ==
* Host nation (Slovakia)

Rank	Nation	Gold	Silver	Bronze	Total
1	Great Britain (GBR)	2	0	1	3
2	Poland (POL)	1	1	2	4
3	Belgium (BEL)	1	0	0	1
4	Spain (ESP)	0	2	0	2
5	Czech Republic (CZE)	0	1	0	1
6	Italy (ITA)	0	0	1	1
Totals (6 entries)		4	4	4	12

== Medalists ==
Event	Gold		Silver		Bronze	
Boys road race	Cedric Keppens; Belgium	1:32:33	Patryk Goszczurny; Poland	1:32:33	Michał Strzelecki; Poland	1:32:33
Boys individual time trial (8.4 km)	Patryk Goszczurny; Poland	10:47.90	Pavel Šumpík; Czech Republic	10:56.49	Seb Grindley; Great Britain	10:59.95
Girls road race	Cat Ferguson; Great Britain	1:32:08	Paula Ostiz Taco; Spain	1:32:08	Beatrice Temperoni; Italy	1:32:08
Girls individual time trial (8.4 km)	Cat Ferguson; Great Britain	12:11.58	Paula Ostiz Taco; Spain	12:15.17	Anna Gaborska; Poland	12:19.10
