= 2025 UCI Road World Championships – Women's junior time trial =

Cycling event

Women's junior time trial
2025 UCI Road World Championships

Race details
- Dates: 23 September 2025
- Distance: 18.3 km (11.37 mi)
- Winning time: 25:47.41

Medalists
	Gold	(Netherlands) Megan Arens (NED)
	Silver	(Spain) Paula Ostiz (ESP)
	Bronze	(Norway) Oda Aune Gissinger (NOR)

The Women's junior time trial of the 2025 UCI Road World Championships was a cycling event that took place on 23 September 2025 in Kigali, Rwanda.

== Final classification ==
Pos.	Position in the time trial
Time	Time taken to complete the time trial
Diff	Deficit to the winner of the time trial
DNS	Denotes a rider who did not start
DNF	Denotes a rider who did not finish
DSQ	Denotes a rider who was disqualified from the race
OTL	Denotes a rider who finished outside the time limit

Rank	Rider	Country	Time	Diff.
1st place, gold medalist(s)	Megan Arens	Netherlands	25:47.41	
2nd place, silver medalist(s)	Paula Ostiz	Spain	26:22.71	+ 35.30
3rd place, bronze medalist(s)	Oda Aune Gissinger	Norway	26:24.95	+ 37.54
4	Roos Müller	Netherlands	26:34.92	+ 47.51
5	Erin Boothman	Great Britain	26:36.10	+ 48.69
6	Sidney Swierenga	Canada	26:41.14	+ 53.73
7	Maria Okrucińska	Poland	26:54.25	+ 1:06.84
8	Abigail Miller	Great Britain	27:19.43	+ 1:32.02
9	Liliana Edwards	United States	27:20.17	+ 1:32.76
10	Laura Fivé	Belgium	27:23.54	+ 1:36.13
11	Marlén Rojas	Chile	27:28.05	+ 1:40.64
12	Milana Ushakova	Ukraine	27:28.18	+ 1:40.77
13	Lidia Cusack	United States	27:30.13	+1:42.72
14	Chantal Pegolo	Italy	27:31.97	+1:44.56
15	Polina Danshina	Individual Neutral Athletes	27:35.02	+1:47.61
16	Mariya Yelkina	Kazakhstan	27:40.20	+1:52.79
17	Alejandra Neira Domínguez	Spain	27:45.62	+1:58.21
18	Alexandra Safiri	Cyprus	27:46.58	+1:59.17
19	Hannah Gianatti	Australia	28:09.86	+2:22.45
20	Lilia Ismagilova	Individual Neutral Athletes	28:14.38	+2:26.97
21	Elena De Laurentiis	Italy	28:15.48	+2:28.07
22	Lise Revol	France	28:25.28	+2:37.87
23	Thaïs Poirier	France	28:26.65	+2:39.24
24	Kahsay Tsige Kiros	Ethiopia	28:28.09	+2:40.68
25	Karolina Špicarová	Czech Republic	28:28.31	+2:40.90
26	Marte Dolven	Norway	28:33.19	+2:45.78
27	Luciana Osorio	Colombia	28:38.83	+2:51.42
28	Tully Schweitzer	Australia	28:40.70	+2:53.29
29	Elodie Malois	Canada	28:45.67	+2:58.26
30	Estefanía Castillo	Colombia	28:46.82	+2:59.41
31	Angelina Burenkova	Kazakhstan	29:01.48	+3:14.07
32	Samira Ismailova	Uzbekistan	29:08.91	+3:21.50
33	Yvonne Masengesho	Rwanda	29:43.04	+3:55.63
34	Anna Hanáková	Czech Republic	29:45.92	+3:58.51
35	Megan Botha	South Africa	29:48.68	+4:01.27
36	Nahomi Játiva Martínez	Ecuador	30:22.75	+4:35.34
37	Rahel Gimbato	Ethiopia	30:39.17	+4:51.76
38	Syahla Syafiah	Indonesia	30:42.69	+4:55.28
39	Harshita Jakhar	India	30:47.03	+4:59.62
40	Liliane Uwiringiyimana	Rwanda	30:58.67	+5:11.26
41	Delsia Janse Van Vuuren	Namibia	32:09.44	+6:22.03
42	Errin Mackridge	South Africa	32:11.61	+6:24.20
43	Georgette Vignonfodo	Benin	32:44.82	+6:57.41
44	Osaretin Grace Godwin	Nigeria	33:33.82	+7:46.41
45	Rosemarie Thiel	Namibia	33:37.79	+7:50.38
46	Elvine Marie Rose Yameogo	Burkina Faso	35:46.42	+9:59.01
47	Divine Ogbe	Nigeria	37:17.64	+11:30.23
