= Viktória Chladoňová =

Slovak cyclist (born 2006)

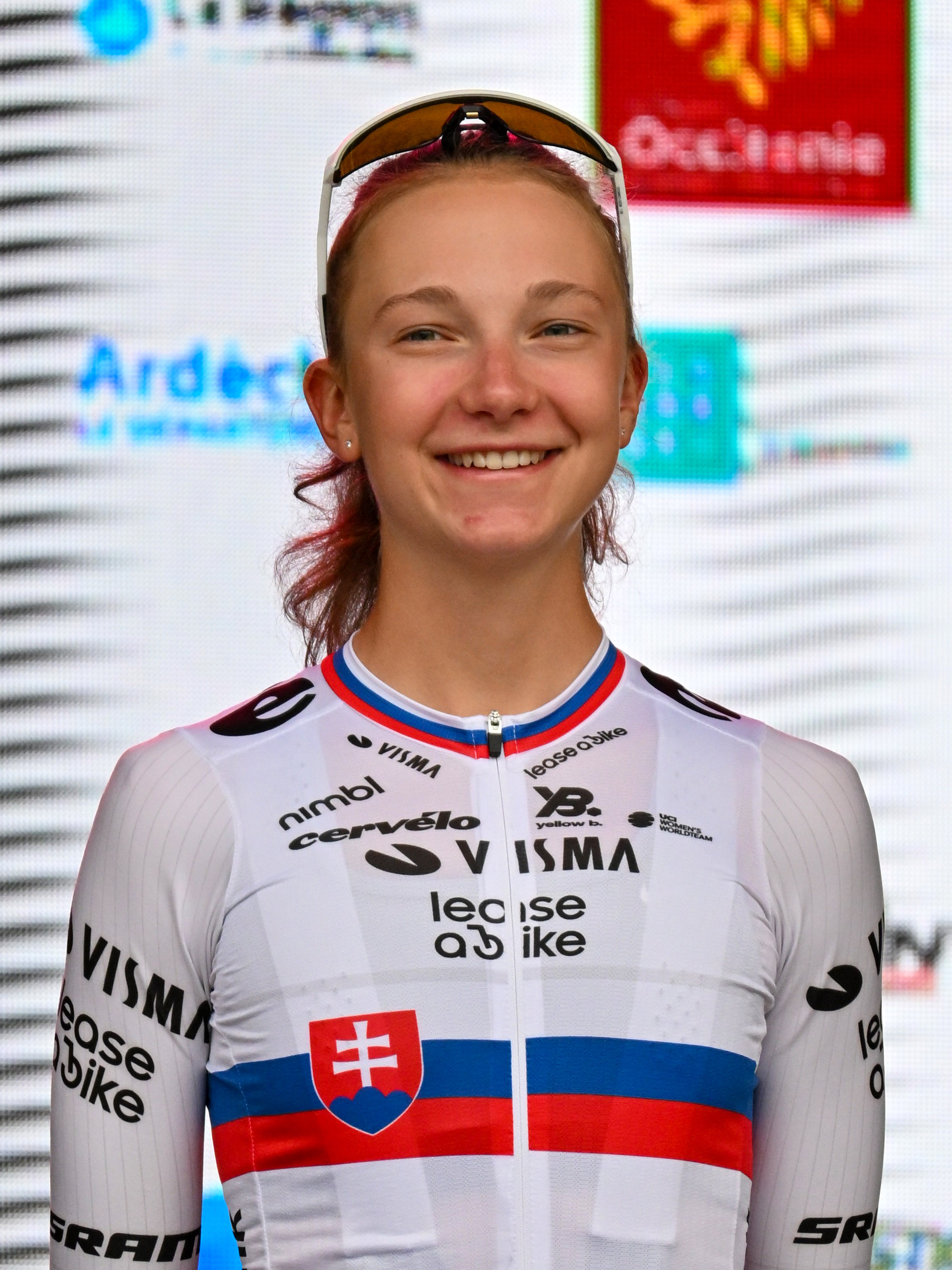
- Chladoňová in 2025

Personal information
- Born: 15 November 2006 (age 19) Soblahov, Slovakia

Cycling career
- Sport: Cycling
- Current team: Visma–Lease a Bike
- Disciplines: Cyclo-cross; Mountain biking; Road
- Role: Rider
- Rider type: Time trialist; All-rounder

Professional team
- 2025–: Visma–Lease a Bike

Major wins
- Cyclo-cross National Championships (2023, 2024, 2025) Road One-day races and Classics National Road Race Championships (2025, 2026) National Time Trial Championships (2025, 2026)
Medal record
Representing Slovakia
Women's road bicycle racing
World Championships
| Gold medal – first place | 2026 Montreal | Under-23 road race |
| Silver medal – second place | 2025 Kigali | Under-23 road race |
| Silver medal – second place | 2025 Kigali | Under-23 time trial |
| Silver medal – second place | 2024 Zürich | Junior time trial |
| Bronze medal – third place | 2024 Zürich | Junior road race |
European Championships
| Bronze medal – third place | 2026 Ljubljana | Under-23 road race |
| Bronze medal – third place | 2026 Ljubljana | Under-23 time trial |
| Bronze medal – third place | 2024 Limburg | Junior time trial |
Women's cyclo-cross
World Championships
| Silver medal – second place | 2026 Hulst | Under-23 |
| Bronze medal – third place | 2024 Tábor | Junior race |
European Championships
| Bronze medal – third place | 2023 Pontchâteau | Junior race |
Women's mountain bike racing
World Championships
| Gold medal – first place | 2024 Pal Arinsal | Junior cross-country |

Viktória Chladoňová (born 15 November 2006) is a Slovak cyclist, who currently rides for UCI Women's WorldTeam Visma–Lease a Bike. She is the current U-23 World Champion. She won the cross-country race at the UCI Junior Mountain Bike World Championships and was runner-up in the U-23 World Championships time trial and road race in 2025.

== Biography ==
Viktória Chladoňová was born on 15 November 2006 in the village of Soblahov, in the Trenčín District. She started with cycling at the age of ten. As of 2024 she studies at a high school in Trenčín.

== Career ==
In February 2023, she was a bronze medalist in the junior race at the UEC European Cyclo-cross Championships in Tábor. That year she also finished in the top ten of the junior cyclo cross race at the 2023 UCI Cyclo-cross World Championships.

She was the winner of the Nové Mesto World Cup for juniors. She was the bronze medalist in the junior race at 2024 UCI Cyclo-cross World Championships. She placed second overall in the Nations Cup event, the 2024 Tour du Gévaudan Occitanie.

In June 2024, she won the Slovak national junior time trial championship and won the junior Slovak and Czech road race cycling Championships. She won the junior cross country race at the 2024 UCI Mountain Bike World Championships in Andorra in August 2024.

In September 2024, she finished third in the junior time trial at the 2024 European Road Championships in Limburg, Belgium, and she was runner-up in the junior time trial at the 2024 UCI Road World Championships in Zurich. That month, she signed with UCI Women's WorldTeam Visma–Lease a Bike, signing a contract until 2027.

In September 2025, she won silver medals in both the U23 time trial and road race at the 2025 UCI World Road Championships in Kigali, Rwanda.

On 24 September 2026, she won the gold medal in the U23 road race at the 2026 UCI World Road Championships in Montreal, Canada, out-sprinting home rider Isabella Holmgren in a 2-up sprint. On 2 October, she placed third in the U23 road race at the 2026 European Road Championships in Ljubljana, Slovenia.

== Major results ==
=== Cyclo-cross ===
2022–2023
1st National Championships
1st Podbrezova
UCI Junior World Cup

2nd Tábor

2023–2024
1st National Championships
UEC Junior European Cup

1st Samorín

1st Podbrezova
1st Selce
1st Topoľčianky
1st Ziar Nad Hronom
Toi Toi Cup

2nd Veselí nad Lužnicí
2nd Hlinsko
2nd Holé Vrchy
3rd Mladá Boleslav
2nd Trnava

3rd UCI World Junior Championships
3rd UEC European Junior Championships
3rd Overall UCI Junior World Cup

1st Hoogerheide
2nd Namur
2nd Troyes
2nd Benidorm

2024–2025
1st National Championships
UEC Under-23 European Cup

1st Samorín

1st Trnava
1st Topoľčianky
1st Topoľčianky II
1st Podbrezova
Toi Toi Cup

2nd Rýmařov

2025–2026
2nd UCI World Under-23 Championships
UCI Under-23 World Cup

2nd Gavere
2nd Hoogerheide
3rd Tábor

=== Mountain bike ===
2023
1st Cross-country, National Junior Championships
Junior Czech MTB Cup

1st Žandov
3rd Kutna Hora

1st Junior Nová Baňa
1st Junior Turčianske Teplice
2024
1st Cross-country, UCI World Junior Championships
1st Cross-country, National Junior Championships
UCI Junior Series

1st Nové Město

Junior Czech MTB Cup

1st Žandov

=== Road ===
2023
National Junior Championships

2nd Road race
2nd Time trial

6th Road race, UEC European Junior Championships
2024 (1 pro win)
1st Groupama Ladies Race Slovakia
National Junior Championships

1st Road race
1st Time trial

UCI World Junior Championships

2nd Time trial
3rd Road race

2nd Overall Tour du Gévaudan Occitanie

1st Mountains classification

3rd Time trial, UEC European Junior Championships
2025 (2)
National Championships

1st Road race
1st Time trial

UCI World Under-23 Championships

2nd Road race
2nd Time trial

4th Road race, UEC European Under-23 Championships
7th Overall Vuelta a Extremadura
7th Overall Tour Cycliste Féminin International de l'Ardèche
8th Overall Tour of Norway

1st Young rider classification

9th Overall Volta a Catalunya
2026 (3)
UCI World Under-23 Championships

1st Road race
4th Time trial

National Championships

1st Road race
1st Time trial

3rd Road race, UEC European Under-23 Championships
3rd Time trial, UEC European Under-23 Championships
