= Anja Grossmann =

Swiss cyclist

Personal information
- Born: 19 October 2008 (age 17)

Cycling career
- Sport: Cycling
- Disciplines: Road; Mountain; Cyclo-cross
- Role: Rider
Medal record
Representing Switzerland
Women's road bicycle racing
World Championships
Bronze medal – third place	2025 Kigali	Junior road race
European Championships
Silver medal – second place	2025 Guilherand-Granges	Junior road race
Women's mountain bike racing
World Championships
Bronze medal – third place	2025 Crans-Montana	Team relay
Silver medal – second place	2025 Crans-Montana	Junior race
Women's cyclo-cross
European Championships
Gold medal – first place	2024 Pontevedra	Junior race

Anja Grossmann (born 19 October 2008) is a Swiss cyclist. The 2024 European junior cyclo-cross champion, she was a medalist in the junior races at the 2025 UCI Road World Championships, the 2025 European Road Championships and the 2025 UCI Mountain Bike World Championships.

== Career ==
From Lucerne, Grossman was a gold medalist at the 2024 UEC European Cyclo-cross Championships in the women's junior race in November 2024. She dedicated the win to the memory of her former teammate Muriel Furrer who had recently died following an accident.

Grossman was a silver medalist at the 2025 UCI Mountain Bike World Championships in the women junior cross-country olympic distance. She was also a bronze medalist in the mixed team relay at the championships.

Grossman finished third in the junior women’s road race at the 2025 UCI Road World Championships in Kigali, Rwanda. She placed second behind Paula Ostiz the following month in the junior road race at the 2025 European Road Championships in Guilherand-Granges on 3 October 2025.

In August 2026, she won the junior women's cross country title at the 2026 UCI Mountain Bike World Championships, and shortly afterwards, signed for FDJ–Suez for the 2027 road cycling season.
