= Lore De Schepper =

Belgian cyclist

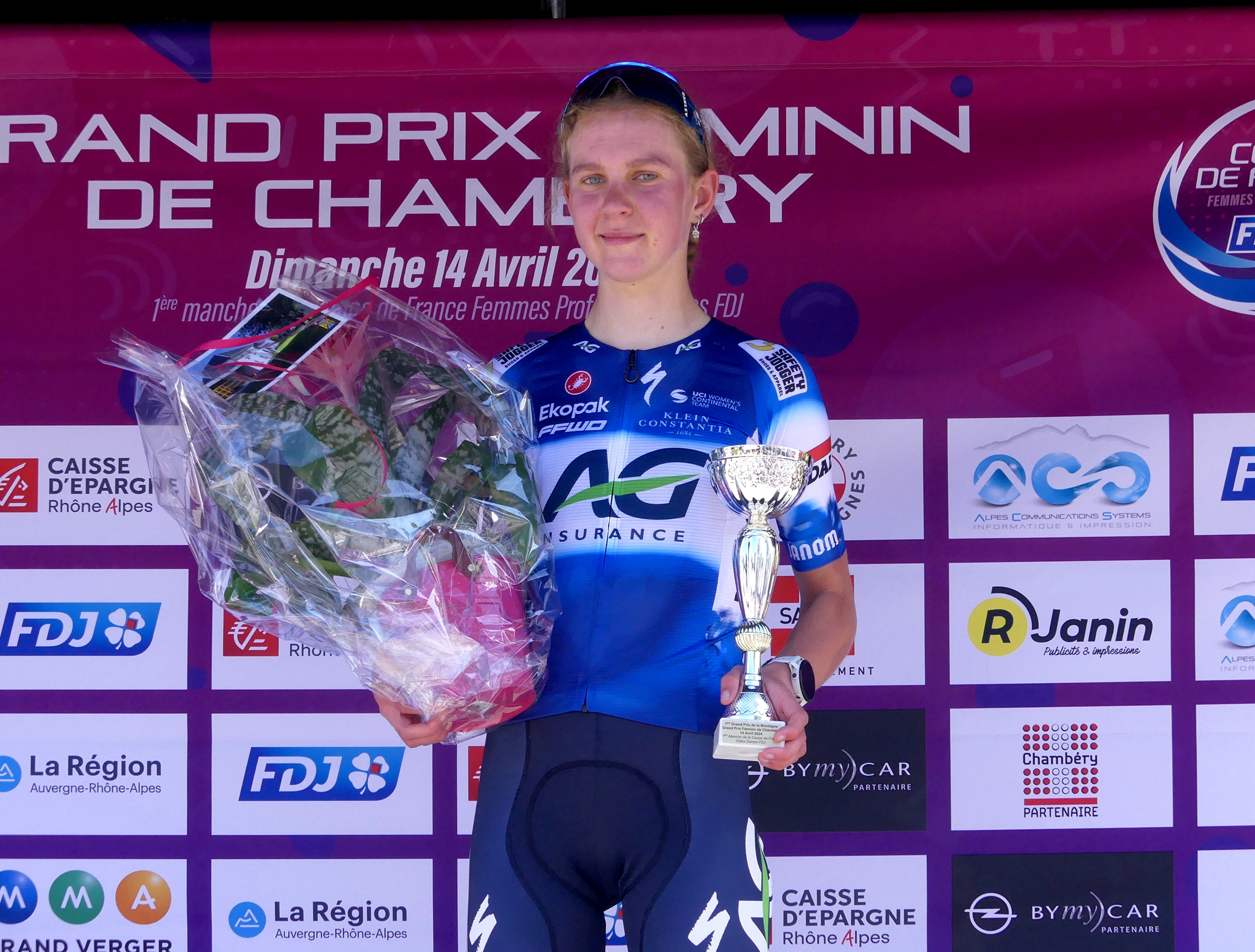
- De Schepper in 2024

Personal information
- Born: 12 November 2005 (age 20) Belgium

Cycling career
- Sport: Cycling
- Current team: AG Insurance–Soudal
- Disciplines: Cyclo-cross; Road
- Role: Rider

Amateur team
- 2023: AG Insurance-NXTG U19

Professional teams
- 2024: AG Insurance–Soudal NXTG
- 2024–: AG Insurance–Soudal

Lore De Schepper (born 12 November 2005) is a Belgian professional road cyclist and cyclo-cross racer who currently rides for UCI Women's WorldTeam AG Insurance–Soudal. Born in Lokeren, she previously lived for six years in Australia before settling in Bonheiden, Belgium. Alongside her cycling career, she studies Sport Sciences at the Vrije Universiteit Brussel (VUB), within its dedicated elite athlete programme.

== Career ==
=== Early career (2021–2023) ===
De Schepper came to prominence in the junior cyclo-cross ranks. In the 2022–23 season she won the junior women's race at Overijse and finished second at the Belgian National Junior Cyclo-cross Championships in Lokeren, behind Xaydee Van Sinaey. At the 2023 UCI Cyclo-cross World Championships she finished 17th in the junior women's race. On the road, she was 8th at the junior Tour of Flanders and 9th at the UEC European Junior Road Championships.

She was a member of the AG Insurance–Soudal junior team (AG Insurance-NXTG U19) in 2023. That year she also raced in France, finishing 11th overall at the Tour du Gévaudan Occitanie.

=== 2024: breakthrough season ===
For 2024, De Schepper moved up to the U23 development team AG Insurance Soudal Devo Team. She was quickly promoted to the elite WorldTeam squad in July 2024 after a series of strong results.

In the cyclo-cross winter of 2023–24, De Schepper won the Belgian National U23 Cyclo-cross Championships in Meulebeke, finishing ahead of Julie Brouwers and Xaydee Van Sinaey in the U23 category, while placing 4th overall in the elite race won by Sanne Cant. She also finished 5th overall in the 2024 senior Belgian National Cyclo-cross Championships, competing against elite riders.

On the road in 2024, De Schepper won her first elite race at the Grand Prix Féminin de Chambéry, a category 1.1 event. In the Czech stage race Gracia–Orlová, she placed 2nd on the opening stage and 5th overall. At the Tour de Romandie Féminin, a UCI Women's WorldTour event, she finished 9th in two separate stages and 8th in the overall classification. She was 11th overall at the Tour de Normandie Féminin and 3rd on the opening stage of the Tour de Féminin (Czech Republic).

At the Tour de l'Avenir Femmes, she won the opening prologue, a 2.1 km mountain time trial, and wore the leader's jersey before finishing third on Stage 1 the following day. She subsequently had to abandon the race due to stomach problems.

In September 2024, she was selected for the Belgian national team at the UCI Road World Championships in Zürich, where she rode in a support role for Lotte Kopecky. Also in 2024, she competed in gravel racing, finishing 3rd in the 3RIDES event of the UCI Gravel World Series.

=== 2025: first full elite season ===
De Schepper's first full season at elite UCI Women's World Tour level confirmed her status as one of the most promising young climbers in the women's peloton. She rode the spring classics, including Liège–Bastogne–Liège Femmes where she finished 20th, and the Tour de Suisse Women where she placed 34th overall.

At the Giro d'Italia Women, she delivered her strongest result at a grand tour to that point, finishing 8th on the mountainous Stage 4 and 22nd overall. She then led the Belgian challenge at the Tour de l'Avenir Femmes, finishing 4th in the general classification, narrowly missing the podium. In the autumn, she competed in the inaugural stand-alone UCI Road World Under-23 Championships where she finished 8th in the road race, and placed 7th at the UEC Road European Under-23 Championships.

At the end of the season, De Schepper was awarded the Belofte van het Jaar (Talent of the Year) prize in Belgian cycling. Reflecting on the award, she said: "It's confirmation that I'm on the right path. This season taught me so much, especially in stage racing, and this gives me a lot of motivation for 2026." She has expressed ambitions to target the Ardennes classics and major stage races, with the Giro d'Italia Women at the top of her goals list.

=== 2026 ===
De Schepper began 2026 with the Setmana Ciclista Volta Femenina de la Comunitat Valenciana and shortly after placed 3rd at the Grand Prix Féminin de Chambéry, the same race she won two years earlier. She then rode the Ardennes week, finishing 18th at La Flèche Wallonne Femmes and 18th at Liège–Bastogne–Liège Femmes. She subsequently finished 11th overall at the Vuelta España Femenina, where she also took 2nd in the young rider classification, before continuing her season at the Giro d'Italia Women.

== Major results ==
=== Cyclo-cross ===
2021–2022
1st Nossegem (Juniors)
1st Overijse (Juniors)
2022–2023
2nd National Junior Championships
2023–2024
1st U23 Belgian National Cyclo-cross Championships

=== Gravel ===
2024
UCI Gravel World Series

3rd 3RIDES

=== Road ===
2023
4th National Championships – Road Race (Juniors)
7th National Championships – ITT (Juniors)
8th Ronde van Vlaanderen (Juniors)
9th Road race, UEC European Junior Championships
2024
1st Grand Prix Féminin de Chambéry
1st Prologue Tour de l'Avenir Femmes
5th Overall Gracia–Orlová
8th Overall Tour de Romandie
2025
4th Overall Tour de l'Avenir Femmes
7th Road race, UEC Road European Under-23 Championships
8th Road race, UCI World Under-23 Championships
2026
3rd Grand Prix Féminin de Chambéry
10th Overall Giro d'Italia
