= Felicity Wilson-Haffenden =

Australian cyclist (born 2005)

- Wilson-Haffenden during the junior time trial at the 2023 UCI Road World Championships

Personal information
- Born: 16 July 2005 (age 21) Glendevie, Tasmania, Australia

Cycling career
- Sport: Cycling
- Current team: Lidl–Trek
- Discipline: road
- Role: Rider

Amateur team
- 2023: Team BridgeLane

Professional team
- 2024–: Lidl–Trek

Major wins
- One-day races and Classics National Time Trial Championships (2026)
Medal record
Representing Australia
Women's road bicycle racing
World Championships
Gold medal – first place	2026 Montreal	Under-23 time trial
Gold medal – first place	2025 Kigali	Mixed team relay
Gold medal – first place	2023 Glasgow	Junior time trial
Women's track cycling
Commonwealth Games
Gold medal – first place	2026 Glasgow	Team pursuit

Felicity Wilson-Haffenden (born 16 July 2005) is an Australian road racing cyclist, who rides for UCI Women's WorldTeam Lidl–Trek. She won the U23 time trial at the 2026 UCI Road World Championships and the junior time trial at the 2023 UCI Road World Championships.

== Career ==
Formerly a keen hockey player, she took up cycling during the COVID-19 pandemic and after showing an aptitude for the sport attended a Talent ID program at the Tasmanian Institute of Sport (TIS). In 2023, she won both the U19 road race and time trial titles at the Australian road championships. She won the junior time trial at the 2023 UCI Road World Championships in Glasgow. Later that year, she turned professional with UCI Women's WorldTeam Lidl–Trek on a three-year contract.

In January 2026, she won the senior Australian National Time Trial Championships. She was selected to ride for Australia at the 2026 Commonwealth Games in Glasgow, Scotland, winning the gold medal in the team pursuit on 30 July. She initially qualified for the bronze medal race in the individual pursuit but was disqualified following random post-race equipment checks by official which deemed a strapping tape to her shoulders to alleviate discomfort constituted a "morphological change", with teammate Sophie Edwards also disqualified for having too much padding in her helmet.

In September, she won the U23 time trial at the 2026 UCI Road World Championships in Montreal. She signed a two year contract with Fenix Premier-Tech starting in the 2027 season.

== Major results ==
=== Road ===
2023
1st Time trial, UCI World Junior Championships
Oceania Junior Championships

1st Time trial
2nd Road race

National Junior Championships

1st Road race
1st Time trial
2nd Criterium

2024
2nd Time trial, National Under-23 Championships
2025
UCI World Championships

1st Team relay
4th Under-23 time trial

2nd Time trial, National Under-23 Championships
2026 (1 pro win)
1st Time trial, UCI World Under-23 Championships
1st Time trial, National Championships
2nd Chrono Gatineau
3rd Overall Baloise Ladies Tour

=== Track ===
2026
1st Team pursuit, Commonwealth Games
1st Team pursuit, UCI World Cup, Perth
