= Ava Holmgren =

Canadian cyclist (born 2005)

Personal information
- Born: 22 May 2005 (age 21) Oro-Medonte, Canada

Cycling career
- Sport: Cycling
- Current team: Lidl–Trek
- Disciplines: Road; Cyclo-cross; Mountain biking
- Role: Rider

Amateur team
- 2022–2023: Stimulus Orbea Racing Team

Professional team
- 2024–: Lidl–Trek
Medal record
Women's mountain bike racing
Representing Canada
World Championships
Bronze medal – third place	2024 Vallnord	U–23 cross-country short track

Ava Holmgren (born 22 May 2005) is a Canadian professional racing cyclist, who currently rides for UCI Women's WorldTour Team Lidl–Trek. Her twin sister Isabella and brother Gunnar are also professional cyclists.

== Major results ==
=== Cyclo-cross ===
2021–2022
1st Pan American Junior Championships
Junior USCX Cyclocross Series

1st Mason Day 1
1st Mason Day 2

Junior New England Series

1st Northampton Day 2
2nd Northampton Day 1

1st Junior Gullegem
1st Junior Trek Cup
1st Junior Hendersonville Day 1
2022–2023
1st Pan American Junior Championships
1st National Championships
Junior USCX Cyclocross Series

1st Rochester Day 1
1st Rochester Day 2
2nd Falmouth Day 1

1st Junior Trek Cup
2nd UCI World Junior Championships
2nd Overall UCI Junior World Cup

1st Besançon
3rd Benidorm
3rd Maasmechelen
4th Zonhoven
4th Tábor

Junior X²O Badkamers Trophy

2nd Herentals

2nd Junior Baal
2nd Victoria
2nd Northampton Day 1
2023–2024
1st National Championships
2nd Pan American Under-23 Championships
2nd Victoria
X²O Badkamers Trophy

3rd Baal

=== Road ===
2021
5th Road race, National Junior Championships
2022
3rd Time trial, National Junior Championships
4th Overall Watersley Ladies Challenge

1st Young rider classification

2023
5th Time trial, National Junior Championships
9th Overall EPZ Omloop van Borsele
2025
10th Time trial, UCI World Under-23 Championships

=== Mountain bike ===
2024
1st National Under-23 Championships
