= Sidney Swierenga =

Canadian cyclist (born 2007)

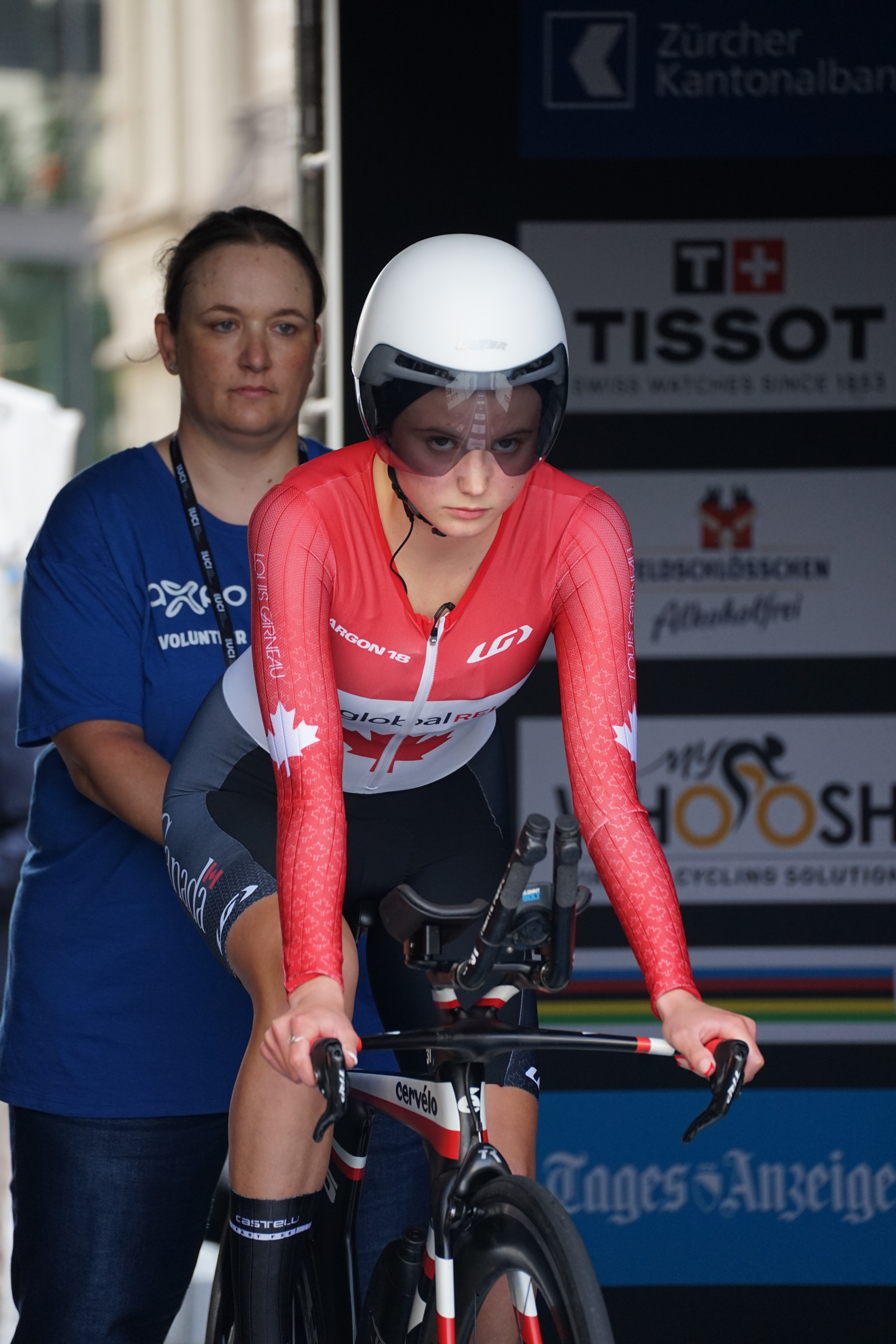
- Swierenga at the 2024 UCI Road World Championships in Zurich

Personal information
- Born: 18 June 2007 (age 19)

Cycling career
- Sport: Cycling
- Current team: Grouwels-Watersley R&D Road Team
- Discipline: Road
- Role: Rider

Amateur teams
- 2024: TaG Cycling
- 2025: Grouwels-Watersley R&D Road Team

Sidney Swierenga (born 18 June 2007) is a Canadian cyclist. Swierenga is a two-time Canadian junior time trial champion, and considered one of Canada's best road cycling prospects. She finished second overall at the 2025 Redlands Bicycle Classic, winning the youth classification.

== Major results ==
2023
National Junior Championships

4th Time trial
8th Road race

2024
National Junior Championships

1st Time trial
6th Road race

5th Overall Tour du Gévaudan Occitanie

1st Youth classification

10th World Junior Championships - Time trial
2025
National Junior Championships

1st Time trial
2nd Road race

1st Overall Tour du Gévaudan Occitanie

1st Stage 2

2nd Overall Tour of the Gila

1st Youth classification

2nd Overall Redlands Bicycle Classic

1st Youth classification

2nd Piccolo Trofeo Alfredo Binda
World Junior Championships

4th Time trial
6th Road race

2026
2nd Grand Prix du Morbihan Femmes
3rd Overall Volta Ciclista a Catalunya
5th Alpes Gresivaudan Classic
9th Clasica de Almeria
