= 2025 UCI Road World Championships =

Cycling world championships

- Location within Rwanda
- Venue: Kigali, Rwanda
- Date: 21–28 September 2025
- Coordinates: 1°56′38″S 30°3′34″E
- Events: 13

The 2025 UCI Road World Championships was the 98th edition of the UCI Road World Championships, the annual world championships for road bicycle racing. It was held from 21 to 28 September 2025 in Kigali, Rwanda. It was the first UCI Road World Championships hosted in Africa.

A total of thirteen events were held, consisting of six road races, six individual time trials, and a team time trial mixed relay. This is the first year with a standalone women's U23 race; previously, the U23 winner was simply the highest-placed rider under 23 in the women's elite race.

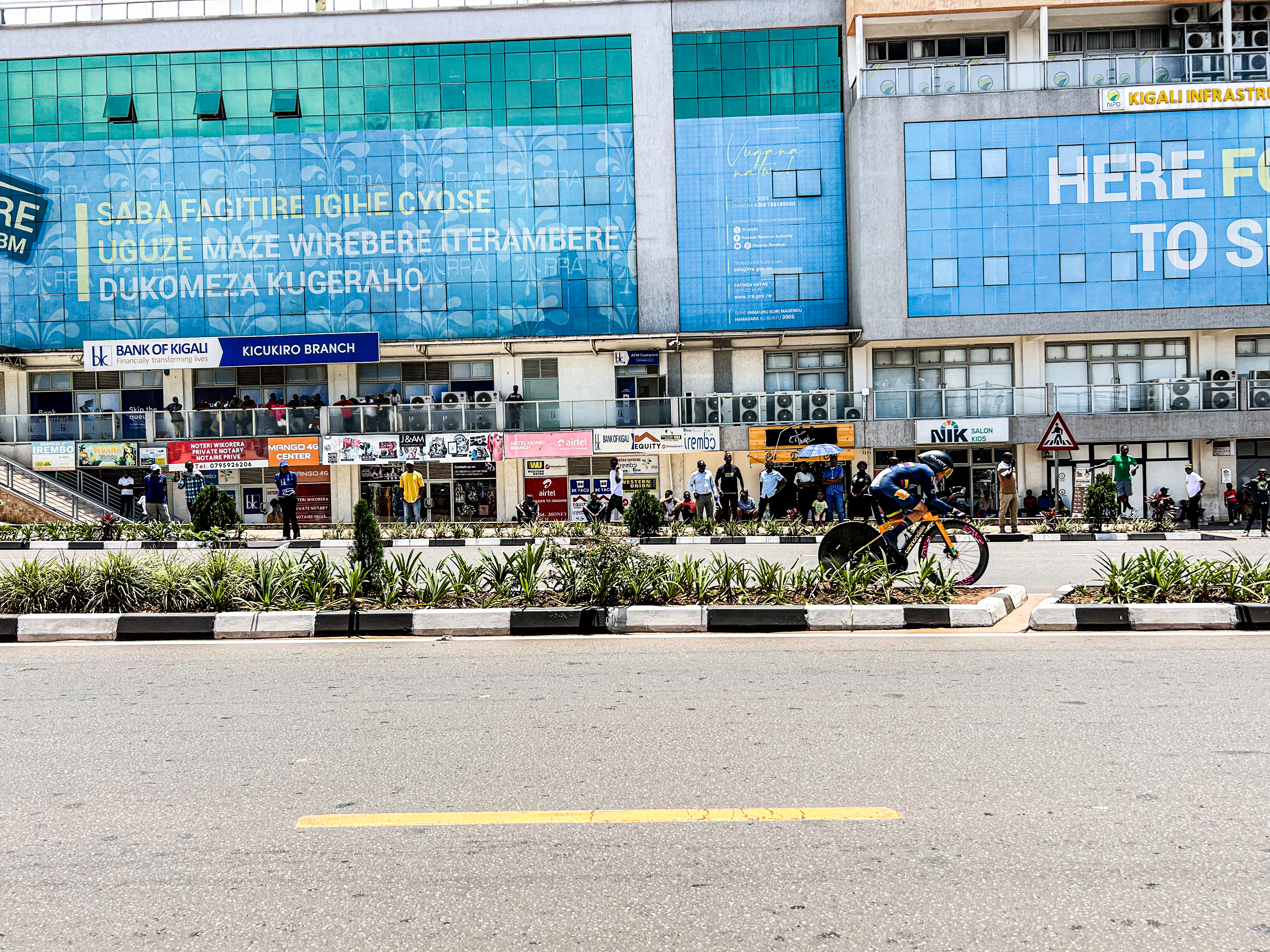
2025 UCI Road World Championships 1

== Course ==
The route was announced during the 2024 UCI Road World Championships in Zurich. The road races take place on a 15.1 kilometres (9.4 mi) circuit around Kigali, with a different number of laps for different events. The elite men's race also includes an extra 42.5 kilometres (26.4 mi) extension that climbs the Mur du Kigali. Kigali sits at an altitude of 1850 metres; the high altitude combined with the amount of climbing led multiple cycling publications to call the route one of the most difficult in the history of the world championships.

== Schedule ==
All times listed below are for the local time – Central Africa Time or UTC+02:00.

=== Road races ===
Date	Timings		Event	Distance	Laps (Note: For the road races, this denotes the number of laps of the 15.1 km (9.4 mi) circuit, beginning and ending at the Kigali convention center.)
21 September	10:10	12:55	Elite women time trial	31.2 km (19.4 mi)	
21 September	13:45	16:50	Elite men time trial	40.6 km (25.2 mi)	
22 September	10:35	12:45	Under-23 women time trial	22.6 km (14.0 mi)	
22 September	13:35	16:30	Under-23 men time trial	31.2 km (19.4 mi)	
23 September	10:45	12:45	Junior women time trial	18.3 km (11.4 mi)	
23 September	14:00	16:30	Junior men time trial	22.6 km (14.0 mi)	
24 September	12:30	17:00	Mixed team time trial relay	42.4 km (26.3 mi)	2 (Note: This denotes the number of laps of the 21.2 km (13.2 mi) circuit; the first lap is completed by three male riders, with the second lap completed by three female riders.)
25 September	13:05	16:30	Under-23 women road race	119.3 km (74.1 mi)	8
26 September	08:00	11:15	Junior men road race	119.3 km (74.1 mi)	8
26 September	12:00	16:25	Under-23 men road race	164.6 km (102.3 mi)	11
27 September	08:20	10:40	Junior women road race	74.6 km (46.4 mi)	5
27 September	12:05	16:45	Elite women road race	164.6 km (102.3 mi)	11
28 September	09:45	16:45	Elite men road race	267.5 km (166.2 mi)	15 + 1* (Note: 9 laps of the Kigali circuit, then an extension circuit that climbs the Mur du Kigal, ending with 6 more laps in Kigali.)

== Medal summary ==
=== Elite events ===
Event	Gold		Silver		Bronze	
Men's Events
Men's road race	Tadej Pogačar; Slovenia	6h 21' 20"	Remco Evenepoel; Belgium	+ 1' 28"	Ben Healy; Ireland	+ 2' 16"
Men's time trial	Remco Evenepoel; Belgium	49' 06.03"	Jay Vine; Australia	+ 1'14.80	Ilan Van Wilder; Belgium	+ 2'06.07"
Women's Events
Women's road race	Magdeleine Vallieres; Canada	4h 34' 48"	Niamh Fisher-Black; New Zealand	+ 23"	Mavi García; Spain	+ 27"
Women's time trial	Marlen Reusser; Switzerland	43' 09.34"	Anna van der Breggen; Netherlands	+ 51.89"	Demi Vollering; Netherlands	+ 1' 04.73"
Mixed Event
Mixed relay	Australia; Michael Matthews; Lucas Plapp; Jay Vine; Brodie Chapman; Amanda Spratt; Felicity Wilson-Haffenden	54' 30.47"	France; Bruno Armirail; Paul Seixas; Pavel Sivakov; Cédrine Kerbaol; Juliette Labous; Maeva Squiban	+ 5.24"	Switzerland; Jan Christen; Stefan Küng; Mauro Schmid; Jasmin Liechti; Marlen Reusser; Noemi Rüegg	+ 10.00"

=== Under-23 events ===
Event	Gold		Silver		Bronze	
Men's Under-23 Events
Men's under-23 road race	Lorenzo Finn; Italy	3h 57' 24"	Jan Huber; Switzerland	+ 31"	Marco Schrettl; Austria	+ 1' 13"
Men's under-23 time trial	Jakob Söderqvist; Sweden	38' 24.43"	Nate Pringle; New Zealand	+ 1'03.96"	Maxime Decomble; France	+ 1'04.13"
Women's Under-23 Events
Women's under-23 road race	Célia Gery; France	3h 57'24"	Viktória Chladoňová; Slovakia	+ 2"	Paula Blasi; Spain	+ 12"
Women's under-23 time trial	Zoe Bäckstedt; Great Britain	30' 56.13"	Viktória Chladoňová; Slovakia	+ 1'50.85	Federica Venturelli; Italy	+ 2'11.58

=== Junior events ===
Event	Gold		Silver		Bronze	
Men's Juniors Events
Men's junior road race	Harry Hudson; Great Britain	2h 55'19"	Johan Blanc; France	+ 16"	Jan Jackowiak; Poland	+ 16"
Men's junior time trial	Michiel Mouris; Netherlands	29' 07.61"	Ashlin Barry; United States	+ 6.84"	Seff Van Kerckhove; Belgium	+ 8.58"
Women's Juniors Events
Women's junior road race	Paula Ostiz; Spain	2h 09'19"	Chantal Pegolo; Italy	s.t.	Anja Grossmann; Switzerland	s.t.
Women's junior time trial	Megan Arens; Netherlands	25' 47.41"	Paula Ostiz; Spain	+ 35.30"	Oda Aune Gissinger; Norway	+ 37.54"

== Medal table ==
Rank	Nation	Gold	Silver	Bronze	Total
1	Netherlands	2	1	1	4
2	Great Britain	2	0	0	2
3	France	1	2	1	4
4	Belgium	1	1	2	4
4	Spain	1	1	2	4
4	Switzerland	1	1	2	4
7	Italy	1	1	1	3
8	Australia	1	1	0	2
9	Canada	1	0	0	1
9	Slovenia	1	0	0	1
9	Sweden	1	0	0	1
12	New Zealand	0	2	0	2
12	Slovakia	0	2	0	2
14	United States	0	1	0	1
15	Austria	0	0	1	1
15	Ireland	0	0	1	1
15	Norway	0	0	1	1
15	Poland	0	0	1	1
Totals (18 entries)		13	13	13	39
