= Paula Ostiz =

Spanish cyclist (born 2007)

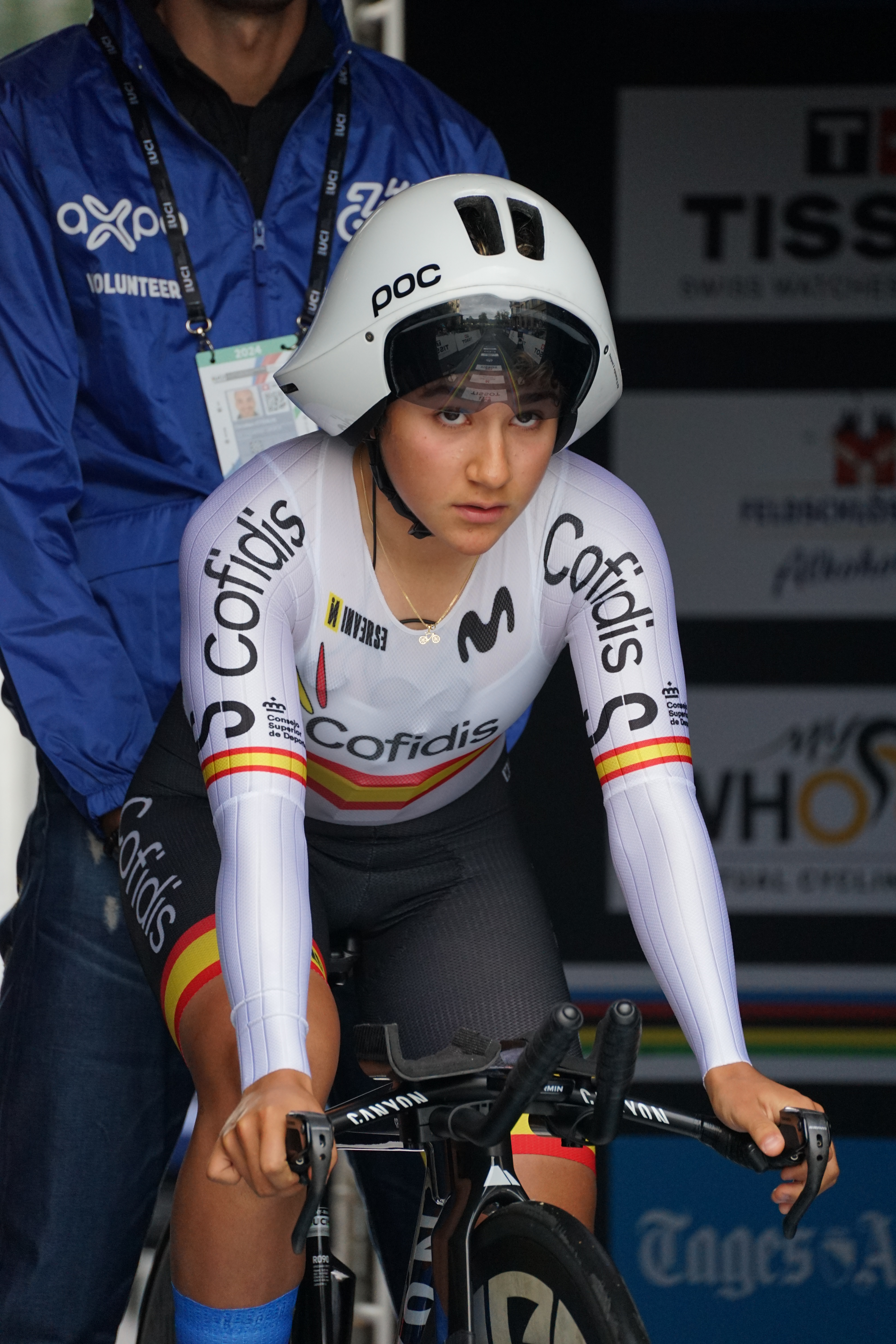
- Ostiz at the 2024 UCI Road World Championships

Personal information
- Full name: Paula Jessica Ostiz Taco
- Born: 12 January 2007 (age 19) Pamplona, Spain

Cycling career
- Sport: Cycling
- Current team: Café Baqué
- Discipline: Road
- Role: Rider
- Rider type: Time trialist; All-rounder

Amateur team
- 2024–2025: Café Baqué

Professional teams
- 2025: Movistar Team (stagiaire)
- 2026–: Movistar Team
Medal record
Representing Spain
Women's road bicycle racing
World Championships
Gold medal – first place	2025 Kigali	Junior road race
Silver medal – second place	2024 Zurich	Junior road race
Silver medal – second place	2025 Kigali	Junior time trial
European Championships
Gold medal – first place	2024 Limburg	Junior time trial
Gold medal – first place	2025 Guilherand-Granges	Junior time trial
Gold medal – first place	2025 Guilherand-Granges	Junior road race
European Youth Summer Olympic Festival
Silver medal – second place	2022 Banská Bystrica	Girls' TT
Silver medal – second place	2022 Banská Bystrica	Girls' road

Paula Jessica Ostiz Taco (born 12 January 2007) is a Spanish cyclist who specializes in road events. She was runner-up in the Junior World Championships road race in 2024. In August 2025, she will join UCI Women's WorldTeam Movistar Team as a stagiaire before joining full-time in 2026.

== Career ==
Ostiz participated in cycling during the 2022 European Youth Olympic Festival in Banská Bystrica, and won silver in the time trial and road race in the girls' class, finishing in both events behind Cat Ferguson.

In June 2024, Ostiz won the junior national title in the Spanish National Road Race and Time Trial Championships. On 11 September 2024, Ostiz won the junior time trial at the 2024 European Road Championships in Limburg, Belgium, and two days later, she signed with UCI Women's WorldTeam Movistar Team in 2025 as a stagiaire before becoming a full-time professional the following year, signing a contract until 2028. Later that month, she was runner-up in the junior road race at the 2024 UCI Road World Championships in Zurich, finishing behind Cat Ferguson.

== Major results ==
2024
UEC European Junior Road Championships

1st Time trial
6th Road race

National Junior Road Championships

1st Road race
1st Time trial

1st Overall Watersley Ladies Challenge

1st Young rider classification

1st GP Cantabria Deporte
1st Campeonato Navarro - ITT
Lea Artibai Txallengea

1st Stages 1 (ITT) & 3

UCI Road World Junior Championships

2nd Road race
7th Time trial

9th Ronde van Vlaanderen Juniors
2025
UCI Road World Junior Championships

1st Road race
2nd Time trial

UEC European Junior Road Championships

1st Road race
1st Time trial

2nd Clásica de Jaén Juniors
