= Fleur Moors =

Belgian cyclist

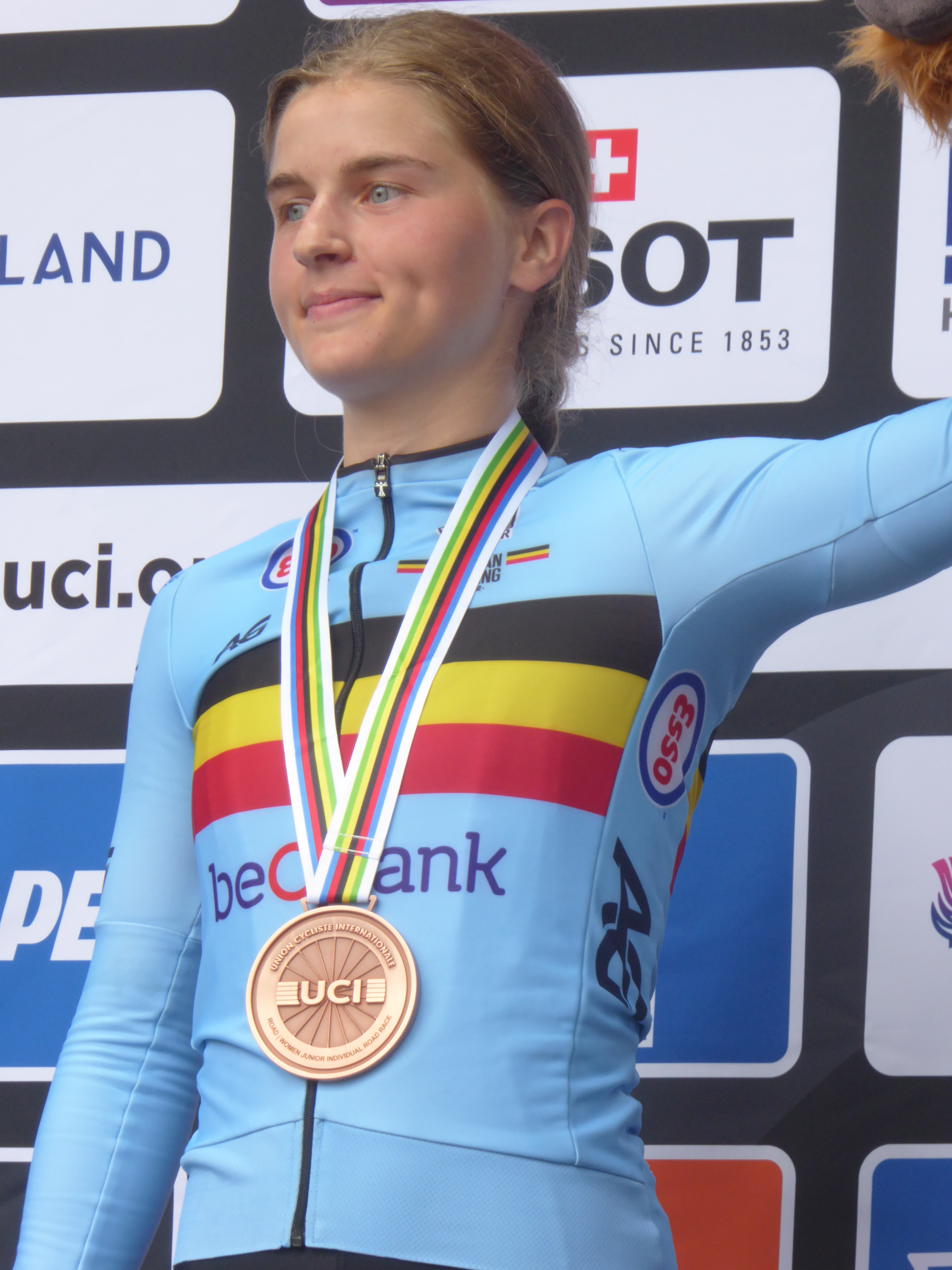
- Moors in 2023

Personal information
- Born: 11 October 2005 (age 21) Bree, Belgium

Cycling career
- Sport: Cycling
- Current team: Baloise Verzekeringen–Het Poetsbureau Lions (cyclo-cross); Lidl–Trek (road)
- Disciplines: Cyclo-cross; Road
- Role: Rider

Professional teams
- 2024–: Baloise–Trek Lions (cyclo-cross)
- 2024–: Lidl–Trek (road)
Medal record
Women's road bicycle racing
Representing Belgium
World Championships
| Bronze medal – third place | 2026 Montreal | U23 road race |
| Bronze medal – third place | 2023 Glasgow | Junior road race |
European Championships
| Gold medal – first place | 2023 Drenthe | Junior road race |
Women's cyclo-cross
World Championships
| Bronze medal – third place | 2026 Hulst | Team relay |

Fleur Moors (born 11 October 2005) is a Belgian cyclist. In 2023, she won the junior road race at the European Championships and the Belgian junior title in cyclo-cross, and finished 3rd in the junior road race at the World Championships. She won the bronze medal at the 2026 UCI Road World Championships – Women's under-23 road race.

== Biography ==
Moors played handball for a club in Bocholt until the lockdowns during the COVID-19 pandemic closed down all training facilities. She then started cycling. In 2023 she joined the Baloise–Trek Lions cyclo-cross team, led by former cyclo-cross world champion Sven Nys. On 11 October 2023, her 18th birthday, she signed a professional contract with the road team Lidl–Trek.

She studies nutrition and dietetics through an online programme for sporters.

== Major results ==
=== Cyclo-cross ===
2021–2022
2nd National Junior Championships
2022–2023
1st National Junior Championships
2023–2024
1st National Under-23 Championships
2025–2026
2nd National Championships
4th UCI World Under-23 Championships

=== Road ===
2023
1st Road race, UEC European Junior Championships
2nd Overall Watersley Ladies Challenge

1st Mountains classification
1st Stage 2

3rd Road race, UCI World Junior Championships
4th Overall Bizkaikoloreak
4th Ronde van Vlaanderen Juniors
5th Road race, National Junior Championships
2024
4th Road race, National Championships
6th Dwars door de Westhoek
8th Dwars door het Hageland
8th Flanders Diamond Tour
2025
1st Dwars door de Westhoek
2nd Dwars door het Hageland
National Championships

3rd Road race
4th Time trial

6th Antwerp Port Epic

=== Gravel ===
2024
1st Heathland Gravel
