= Coupe de France de cyclo-cross =

French cyclo-cross racing series

Coupe de France de Cyclo-cross
Race details
- Date: October–December
- Region: France
- Discipline: Cyclo-cross
- Organiser: French Cycling Federation

History (men)
- First edition: 1983
- Editions: 40 (as of 2022)
- First winner: Patrice Thévenard (FRA)
- Most wins: Francis Mourey (FRA) (12 wins)
- Most recent: Gerben Kuypers (BEL)

History (women)
- First edition: 1999
- First winner: Laurence Leboucher (FRA)
- Most wins: Laurence Leboucher (FRA) (5 wins)
- Most recent: Anaïs Morichon (FRA)

The Coupe de France de Cyclo-cross is a cyclo-cross racing series held annually in France since 1983. It is held over several races throughout France, usually starting in mid October and ending in mid December. The competition was reserved for French riders only until 2017.

== Past winners ==
=== Men ===
==== Elite ====
Year	Winner	Second	Third
1983	Patrice Thévenard		
1984	Didier Martinez		
1985	Alain Daniel		
1986	Laurent Cailleau		
1987	Bruno Lebras		
1988	Daniel Maquet		
1989	Alain Daniel		
1990	Bruno Lebras		
1991	Cyrille Bonnand		
1992	David Pagnier		
1993	David Pagnier		
1994	Emmanuel Magnien		
1995	Dominique Arnould		
1996	Cyriaque Duval		
1997	David Pagnier		
1998	Miguel Martinez		
1999	David Pagnier	Dominique Arnould	Christophe Morel
2000	David Pagnier	Sébastien Loigerot	Jérôme Chiotti
2001	Geoffrey Clochez	Dominique Arnould	John Gadret
2002	John Gadret	Arnaud Labbe	Jérôme Chevallier
2003	John Gadret	Arnaud Labbe	Jérôme Chevallier
2004	Francis Mourey	Arnaud Labbe	Jérôme Chevallier
2005	Francis Mourey	Arnaud Labbe	Ludovic Dubau
2006	Francis Mourey	Ludovic Dubau	Steve Chainel
2007	Francis Mourey	Jérôme Chevallier	Steve Chainel
2008	Francis Mourey	Steve Chainel	Nicolas Bazin
2009	Francis Mourey	Nicolas Bazin	Laurent Colombatto
2010	Francis Mourey	Steve Chainel	Nicolas Bazin
2011	Francis Mourey	Matthieu Boulo	John Gadret
2012	Francis Mourey	John Gadret	Guillaume Perrot
2013	Francis Mourey	Guillaume Perrot	John Gadret
2014	Francis Mourey	Clément Venturini	Fabien Canal
2015	Clément Venturini	Clément Bommé	Julien Roussel
2016	Clément Venturini	Francis Mourey	Melvin Rullière
2017	Fabien Canal	Steve Chainel	Francis Mourey
2018	Francis Mourey	Fabien Canal	David Menut
2019	David Menut	Steve Chainel	Matthieu Boulo
2020	Cancelled		
2021	Joshua Dubau	Timon Rüegg (SUI)	Tony Périou
2022	Gerben Kuypers (BEL)	Loris Rouiller (SUI)	Joshua Dubau

==== Under-23 ====
Year	Winner	Second	Third
1983	Didier Martinez		
1984	No race		
1985	Jean-Pierre Dutilleul		
1986	Dominique Arnould		
1987	Pascal Reverdy		
1988	Christophe Mengin		
1989	José Jauregui		
1990	Emmanuel Magnien		
1991	Jérôme Chiotti		
1992	David Brulon		
1993	Sébastien Loigerot	Anthony Benberka	Jean Charles Fabien
1994	Patrice Halgand		
1995	Christophe Morel		
1996	Christophe Morel		
1997	Miguel Martinez		
1998	John Gadret		
1999	David Derepas		
2000	John Gadret		
2001	Francis Mourey		
2002	Sébastien Minard		
2003	Pierre-Bernard Vaillant		
2004	Romain Villa		
2005	Romain Villa		
2006	Jonathan Lopez		
2007	Aurélien Duval		
2008	Arnaud Jouffroy		
2009	Matthieu Boulo	Melvin Rullière	Thomas Girard
2010	Melvin Rullière	Théo Dumanchin	Irwin Gras
2011	Bastien Duculty	Julian Alaphilippe	David Menut
2012	Clément Venturini	Julian Alaphilippe	Quentin Jaurégui
2013	Clément Venturini	Anthony Turgis	Bastien Duculty
2014	Clément Russo	Romain Seigle	Nicolas Pruvot
2015	Joshua Dubau	Lucas Dubau	Yan Gras
2016	Clément Russo	Lucas Dubau	Joshua Dubau
2017	Joshua Dubau	Antoine Benoist	Yan Gras
2018	Antoine Benoist	Eddy Finé	Mickaël Crispin
2019	Mickaël Crispin	Joris Delbove	Maxime Gagnaire
2020	Cancelled		
2021	Joris Delbove	Florian Richard Andrade	Noé Castille
2022	Rémi Lelandais	Martin Groslambert	Noé Castille

=== Women ===
Year	Winner	Second	Third
1999	Laurence Leboucher	Sandra Temporelli	Nadia Triquet
2000	Laurence Leboucher	Virginie Souchon	Marie-Hélène Coulon
2001	Laurence Leboucher	Maryline Salvetat	Corinne Sempé
2002	Laurence Leboucher	Maryline Salvetat	Corinne Sempé
2003	Maryline Salvetat	Nadia Triquet	Corinne Sempé
2004	Maryline Salvetat	Laurence Leboucher	Nadia Triquet-Claude
2005	Maryline Salvetat	Laurence Leboucher	Nadia Triquet-Claude
2006	Laurence Leboucher	Maryline Salvetat	Christel Ferrier-Bruneau
2007	Maryline Salvetat	Christel Ferrier-Bruneau	Laurence Leboucher
2008	Christel Ferrier-Bruneau	Maryline Salvetat	Nadia Triquet-Claude
2009	Christel Ferrier-Bruneau	Caroline Mani	Pauline Ferrand-Prévot
2010	Christel Ferrier-Bruneau	Caroline Mani	Pauline Ferrand-Prévot
2011	Pauline Ferrand-Prévot	Christel Ferrier-Bruneau	Marlène Morel-Petitgirard
2012	Lucie Chainel-Lefèvre	Marlène Morel-Petitgirard	Marlène Petit
2013	Lucie Chainel-Lefèvre	Marlène Morel-Petitgirard	Marlène Petit
2014	Marlène Petit	Juliette Labous	Maëlle Grossetête
2015	Maëlle Grossetête	Hélène Clauzel	Marlène Petit
2016	Marlène Petit	Perrine Clauzel	Évita Muzic
2017	Lucie Chainel	Jade Wiel	Marlène Petit
2018	Marlène Petit	Marlène Morel-Petitgirard	Anaïs Grimault
2019	Olivia Onesti	Marlène Petit	Lauriane Duraffourg
2020	Cancelled		
2021	Amandine Fouquenet	Anaïs Morichon	Anaïs Grimault
2022	Anaïs Morichon	Perrine Clauzel	Lauriane Duraffourg
