= 2024 UEC European Cyclo-cross Championships =

The 2024 UEC European Cyclo-cross Championships were held on 2 and 3 November 2024 in Pontevedra, Spain.

== Results ==
=== Women ===
==== Elite ====
The Elite Women race took place on Sunday 3 November 2024 in 7 laps over a total distance of 23.25 km.

Result
Rank	#	Cyclist	Nation	Time	Diff.
1st place, gold medalist(s)	1	Fem van Empel	Netherlands	50:41	
2nd place, silver medalist(s)	3	Ceylin del Carmen Alvarado	Netherlands	50:41	+0:00
3rd place, bronze medalist(s)	2	Lucinda Brand	Netherlands	50:48	+0:07
4	6	Sara Casasola	Italy	50:51	+0:10
5	13	Amandine Fouquenet	France	50:58	+0:17
6	11	Alicia Franck	Belgium	50:58	+0:17
7	8	Laura Verdonschot	Belgium	50:59	+0:18
8	12	Hélène Clauzel	France	51:07	+0:26
9	5	Aniek van Alphen	Netherlands	51:08	+0:27
10	14	Lucia Gonzalez Blanco	Spain	51:31	+0:50
11	4	Inge van der Heijden	Netherlands	51:42	+1:01
12	9	Marion Norbert Riberolle	Belgium	51:50	+1:09
13	7	Francesca Baroni	Italy	51:52	+1:11
14	15	Sofia Rodriguez Revert	Spain	52:00	+1:19
15	10	Sanne Cant	Belgium	52:40	+1:59
16	19	Zuzanna Krzystala	Poland	52:53	+2:12
17	16	Alicia Gonzalez Blanco	Spain	53:29	+2:48
18	17	Sara Cueto Vega	Spain	54:30	+3:49
19	18	Lucia Gomez Andreu	Spain	55:32	+4:51
20	20	Nadja Heigl	Austria	55:55	+5:14

==== Under 23 ====
The Under 23 Women race took place on Sunday 3 November 2024 in 6 laps over a total distance of 19.95 km.

Result
Rank	#	Cyclist	Nation	Time	Diff.
1st place, gold medalist(s)	8	Célia Gery	France	42:47	
2nd place, silver medalist(s)	1	Marie Schreiber	Luxembourg	42:47	+0:00
3rd place, bronze medalist(s)	4	Leonie Bentveld	Netherlands	42:51	+0:04
4	2	Kristýna Zemanová	Czech Republic	44:09	+1:22
5	11	Fleur Moors	Belgium	44:25	+1:38
6	19	Viktória Chladoňová	Slovakia	44:40	+1:53
7	13	Lucia Bramati	Italy	45:13	+2:26
8	9	Amandine Muller	France	45:13	+2:26
9	14	Alice Papo	Italy	45:50	+3:03
10	7	Iris Offerein	Netherlands	45:52	+3:05
11	20	Sofia Ungerová	Slovakia	45:56	+3:09
12	12	Nette Coppens	Belgium	45:57	+3:10
13	6	Femke Gort	Netherlands	46:26	+3:39
14	10	Electa Gallezot	France	46:30	+3:43
15	3	Katerina Douderová	Czech Republic	46:30	+3:43
16	15	Aroa Otero Taboas	Spain	46:41	+3:54
17	21	Nora Fischer	Austria	47:10	+4:23
18	17	Laura Maria Mira Juarez	Spain	47:26	+4:39
19	5	Puck Langenbarg	Netherlands	48:31	+5:44
20	16	Nahia Arana Quintanilla	Spain	48:52	+6:05
21	18	Adriana Alguacil Sanchez	Spain	49:22	+6:35
	22	Nelia Kabetaj	Albania	DNF	

==== Junior ====
The Junior Women race took place on Sunday 3 November 2024 in 5 laps over a total distance of 16.65 km.

Result
Rank	#	Cyclist	Nation	Time	Diff.
1st place, gold medalist(s)	14	Anja Grossmann	Switzerland	37:30	
2nd place, silver medalist(s)	6	Barbora Bukovská	Czech Republic	37:31	+0:01
3rd place, bronze medalist(s)	13	Giorgia Pellizotti	Italy	37:31	+0:01
4	8	Mae Cabaca	Netherlands	37:48	+0:18
5	12	Elisa Ferri	Italy	37:48	+0:18
6	5	Amálie Gottwaldová	Czech Republic	37:49	+0:19
7	2	Jeanne Duterne	France	38:00	+0:30
8	4	Zélie Lambert	France	38:00	+0:30
9	1	Lison Desprez	France	38:02	+0:32
10	15	Lorena Patiño Villanueva	Spain	38:05	+0:35
11	9	Noï Moes	Netherlands	38:09	+0:39
12	3	Lise Revol	France	38:14	+0:44
13	7	Lucie Grohová	Czech Republic	38:17	+0:47
14	21	Foldager Mille Nielsen	Denmark	38:27	+0:57
15	11	Zita Peeters	Belgium	38:55	+1:25
16	20	Aitana Gutierrez Velarde	Spain	39:31	+2:01
17	16	Ana Lopez Burgos	Spain	39:47	+2:17
18	17	Maier Olano Arozena	Spain	40:12	+2:42
19	18	Nahia Garcia Bidaburu	Spain	40:30	+3:00
20	19	Lidia Castro De La Serna	Spain	40:58	+3:28
21	23	Maria Ambrozkiewicz	Poland	41:47	+4:17
22	22	Mairit Kaarjärv	Estonia	44:02	+6:32
23	10	Sanne Laurijssen	Belgium	-2 LAP	

=== Men ===
==== Elite ====
The Elite Men race took place on Sunday 3 November 2024 in 9 laps over a total distance of 29.85 km.

Result
Rank	#	Cyclist	Nation	Time	Diff.
1st place, gold medalist(s)	6	Thibau Nys	Belgium	57:46	
2nd place, silver medalist(s)	12	Felipe Orts Lloret	Spain	57:49	+0:03
3rd place, bronze medalist(s)	2	Eli Iserbyt	Belgium	57:55	+0:09
4	3	Niels Vandeputte	Belgium	58:01	+0:15
5	9	Lars van der Haar	Netherlands	58:10	+0:24
6	17	David Menut	France	58:18	+0:32
7	7	Gerben Kuypers	Belgium	58:20	+0:34
8	19	Michael Boroš	Czech Republic	58:20	+0:34
9	4	Laurens Sweeck	Belgium	58:36	+0:50
10	1	Michael Vanthourenhout	Belgium	58:47	+1:01
11	15	Dario Lillo	Switzerland	58:53	+1:07
12	11	Mees Hendrikx	Netherlands	59:14	+1:28
13	14	Kevin Suarez Fernandez	Spain	59:24	+1:38
14	8	Toon Aerts	Belgium	59:39	+1:53
15	16	Lars Sommer	Switzerland	59:50	+2:04
16	20	Gioele Bertolini	Italy	59:58	+2:12
17	18	Rémi Lelandais	France	1:00:13	+2:27
18	21	Federico Ceolin	Italy	1:00:20	+2:34
19	5	Joran Wyseure	Belgium	1:00:27	+2:41
20	10	Pim Ronhaar	Netherlands	1:00:28	+2:42
21	13	Mario Junquera San Millan	Spain	1:01:37	+3:51
22	22	Matej Ulík	Slovakia	1:01:39	+3:53
23	23	Bruno Silva	Portugal	1:02:31	+4:45

==== Under 23 ====
The Under 23 Men race took place on Sunday 3 November 2024 in 8 laps over a total distance of 26.55 km.

Result
Rank	#	Cyclist	Nation	Time	Diff.
1st place, gold medalist(s)	1	Jente Michels	Belgium	52:11	
2nd place, silver medalist(s)	12	Filippo Agostinacchio	Italy	52:14	+0:03
3rd place, bronze medalist(s)	7	Aubin Sparfel	France	52:23	+0:12
4	2	Yordi Corsus	Belgium	52:23	+0:12
5	5	Nathan Bommenel	France	52:33	+0:22
6	19	Danny van Lierop	Netherlands	52:34	+0:23
7	23	Miguel Rodriguez Novoa	Spain	52:36	+0:25
8	20	Guus van den Eijnden	Netherlands	52:37	+0:26
9	24	Raul Mira Bonastre	Spain	52:40	+0:29
10	18	David Haverdings	Netherlands	52:54	+0:43
11	13	Samuele Scappini	Italy	52:56	+0:45
12	3	Aaron Dockx	Belgium	52:57	+0:46
13	9	Jules Simon	France	53:06	+0:55
14	17	Maximilian Kerl	Czech Republic	53:12	+1:01
15	8	Tristan Verrier	France	53:20	+1:09
16	14	Stefano Viezzi	Italy	53:26	+1:15
17	4	Kay de Bruyckere	Belgium	53:35	+1:24
18	6	Romain Debord	France	53:44	+1:33
19	22	Keije Solen	Netherlands	54:09	+1:58
20	16	Václav Ježek	Czech Republic	54:10	+1:59
21	10	Nicolas Halter	Switzerland	54:15	+2:04
22	11	Sven Sommer	Switzerland	54:20	+2:09
23	15	Weis Daniel Nielsen	Denmark	55:00	+2:49
24	21	Lucas Janssen	Netherlands	55:41	+3:30
25	27	Rafael Sousa	Portugal	55:53	+3:42
26	25	Emilio Reinoso Sanchez	Spain	56:17	+4:06
27	29	Filip Mård	Sweden	56:55	+4:44
28	28	Tomás Gaspar	Portugal	57:39	+5:28
29	30	Brajan Swider	Poland	58:29	+6:18
30	26	Tomas Pombo Alvarez	Spain	-4 LAP	

==== Junior ====
The Junior Men race took place on Sunday 3 November 2024 in 6 laps over a total distance of 19.95 km.

Result
Rank	#	Cyclist	Nation	Time	Diff.
1st place, gold medalist(s)	5	Mattia Agostinacchio	Italy	40:13	
2nd place, silver medalist(s)	20	Valentin Hofer	Austria	40:21	+0:08
3rd place, bronze medalist(s)	16	Mats Vanden Eynde	Belgium	40:23	+0:10
4	24	Benjamin Noval Suarez	Spain	40:24	+0:11
5	17	Giel Lejeune	Belgium	40:25	+0:12
6	6	Ettore Fabbro	Italy	40:30	+0:17
7	9	Cas Timmermans	Netherlands	40:32	+0:19
8	3	Soan Ruesche	France	40:39	+0:26
9	10	Rick Versloot	Netherlands	40:50	+0:37
10	19	Lars Daelmans	Belgium	40:51	+0:38
11	15	Tomáš Hájek	Czech Republic	41:09	+0:56
12	7	Filippo Grigolini	Italy	41:12	+0:59
13	13	Mads Pé Teunissen van Manen	Netherlands	41:14	+1:01
14	25	Martin Fernandez Garcia	Spain	41:14	+1:01
15	27	Sergio Gamez Ferrer	Spain	41:15	+1:02
16	8	Patrik Pezzo Rosola	Italy	41:16	+1:03
17	2	Soren Bruyere Joumard	France	41:16	+1:03
18	1	Théophile Vassal	France	41:23	+1:10
19	14	Lewin Iten	Switzerland	41:23	+1:10
20	12	Nick Wisse	Netherlands	41:37	+1:24
21	18	Arthur van den Boer	Belgium	41:40	+1:27
22	30	Vilmer Ekman	Sweden	41:48	+1:35
23	4	Johan Blanc	France	41:57	+1:44
24	21	Michael Hettegger	Austria	41:57	+1:44
25	35	Kacper Mizuro	Poland	41:57	+1:44
26	33	Jakub Benca	Slovakia	41:57	+1:44
27	29	Marti Martinez Pages	Spain	42:04	+1:51
28	22	Ayden Jordan	Austria	42:21	+2:08
29	37	Sindre Orholm-Lønseth	Norway	42:23	+2:10
30	26	Raul Puelles Loredo	Spain	42:47	+2:34
31	32	Peter Šoltés	Slovakia	43:00	+2:47
32	38	Gonçalo Costa	Portugal	43:00	+2:47
33	39	Diogo Pinguinha	Portugal	43:08	+2:55
34	11	Finn Bastiaanssen	Netherlands	43:19	+3:06
35	34	Lennox Papi	Luxembourg	43:29	+3:16
36	44	Mihai-Bogdan Brinza	Romania	43:41	+3:28
37	36	Krzysztof Gdula	Poland	43:54	+3:41
38	40	João Vigário	Portugal	44:03	+3:50
39	31	Dexter Kock	Sweden	44:07	+3:54
40	41	Hugo Ramalho	Portugal	44:32	+4:19
41	23	Lucas Kraus	Austria	44:49	+4:36
42	28	Nestor Frias Bajo	Spain	44:50	+4:37
43	42	Lucas Angélico	Portugal	45:32	+5:19
	43	Xavier Gaspar	Portugal	DNF	

=== Mixed Event ===
==== Team Relay ====
The Mixed Team Relay race took place on Saturday 2 November 2024 over a total distance of 19.90 km. Each relay team consisted of 6 riders which could be made up of:

- 1 Elite Men or 1 Under-23 Men rider,
- 1 Under-23 Men or 1 Junior Men rider,
- 1 Junior Men rider,
- 1 Elite Women or 1 Under-23 Women rider,
- 1 Under-23 Women or 1 Junior Women rider,
- 1 Junior Women rider,

The countries were free to choose the starting order of their riders.

Rank	Nation	Riders	Start order	Category	Split		Time
Rank	Nation	Riders	Start order	Category	Rank	Time	Time
1st place, gold medalist(s)	Italy	Federico Ceolin	3A	ME	1	06:25	40:50
1st place, gold medalist(s)	Italy	Mattia Agostinacchio	3B	MJ	1	06:17	40:50
1st place, gold medalist(s)	Italy	Lucia Bramati	3C	WU	2	07:12	40:50
1st place, gold medalist(s)	Italy	Giorgia Pellizotti	3D	WJ	1	07:16	40:50
1st place, gold medalist(s)	Italy	Francesca Baroni	3E	WE	2	07:05	40:50
1st place, gold medalist(s)	Italy	Filippo Agostinacchio	3F	MU	1	06:25	40:50
2nd place, silver medalist(s)	France	Théophile Vassal	1A	MJ	4	06:32	41:01
2nd place, silver medalist(s)	France	Aubin Sparfel	1B	MU	3	06:24	41:01
2nd place, silver medalist(s)	France	Célia Gery	1C	WU	1	06:56	41:01
2nd place, silver medalist(s)	France	Lise Revol	1D	WJ	2	07:18	41:01
2nd place, silver medalist(s)	France	Hélène Clauzel	1E	WE	1	07:02	41:01
2nd place, silver medalist(s)	France	Rémi Lelandais	1F	ME	2	06:39	41:01
3rd place, bronze medalist(s)	Spain	Miguel Rodriguez Novoa	4A	MU	2	06:26	41:04
3rd place, bronze medalist(s)	Spain	Benjamin Noval Suarez	4B	MJ	2	06:18	41:04
3rd place, bronze medalist(s)	Spain	Lorena Patiño Villanueva	4C	WJ	3	07:18	41:04
3rd place, bronze medalist(s)	Spain	Aroa Otero Taboas	4D	WU	3	07:25	41:04
3rd place, bronze medalist(s)	Spain	Sofia Rodriguez Revert	4E	WE	3	07:09	41:04
3rd place, bronze medalist(s)	Spain	Felipe Orts	4F	ME	3	06:18	41:04
4	Czechia	Tomáš Hájek	2A	MJ	3	06:33	41:29
4	Czechia	Barbora Bukovská	2B	WJ	4	07:10	41:29
4	Czechia	Václav Ježek	2C	MU	4	06:41	41:29
4	Czechia	Amálie Gottwaldová	2D	WJ	4	07:13	41:29
4	Czechia	Kristýna Zemanová	2E	WU	4	07:01	41:29
4	Czechia	Michael Boroš	2F	ME	4	06:42	41:29

^{ME} Elite Men
^{MJ} Junior Men
^{MU} Under-23 Men
^{WE} Elite Women
^{WJ} Junior Women
^{WU} Under-23 Women

== Medal table ==
* Host nation (Spain)

2024 UEC Cyclo-cross European Championships
Rank	Nation	Gold	Silver	Bronze	Total
1	Italy (ITA)	2	1	1	4
2	Belgium (BEL)	2	0	2	4
3	Netherlands (NED)	1	1	2	4
4	France (FRA)	1	1	1	3
5	Switzerland (SUI)	1	0	0	1
6	Spain (ESP)*	0	1	1	2
7	Austria (AUT)	0	1	0	1
7	Czech Republic (CZE)	0	1	0	1
7	Luxembourg (LUX)	0	1	0	1
Totals (9 entries)		7	7	7	21
