= European Cycling Championships =

European Cycling Championships may refer to:

- European Road Championships, European Championships of road cycling
- UEC European Track Championships, European Championships of track cycling
- UEC European Cyclo-cross Championships
