= Joshua Dubau =

French cyclist

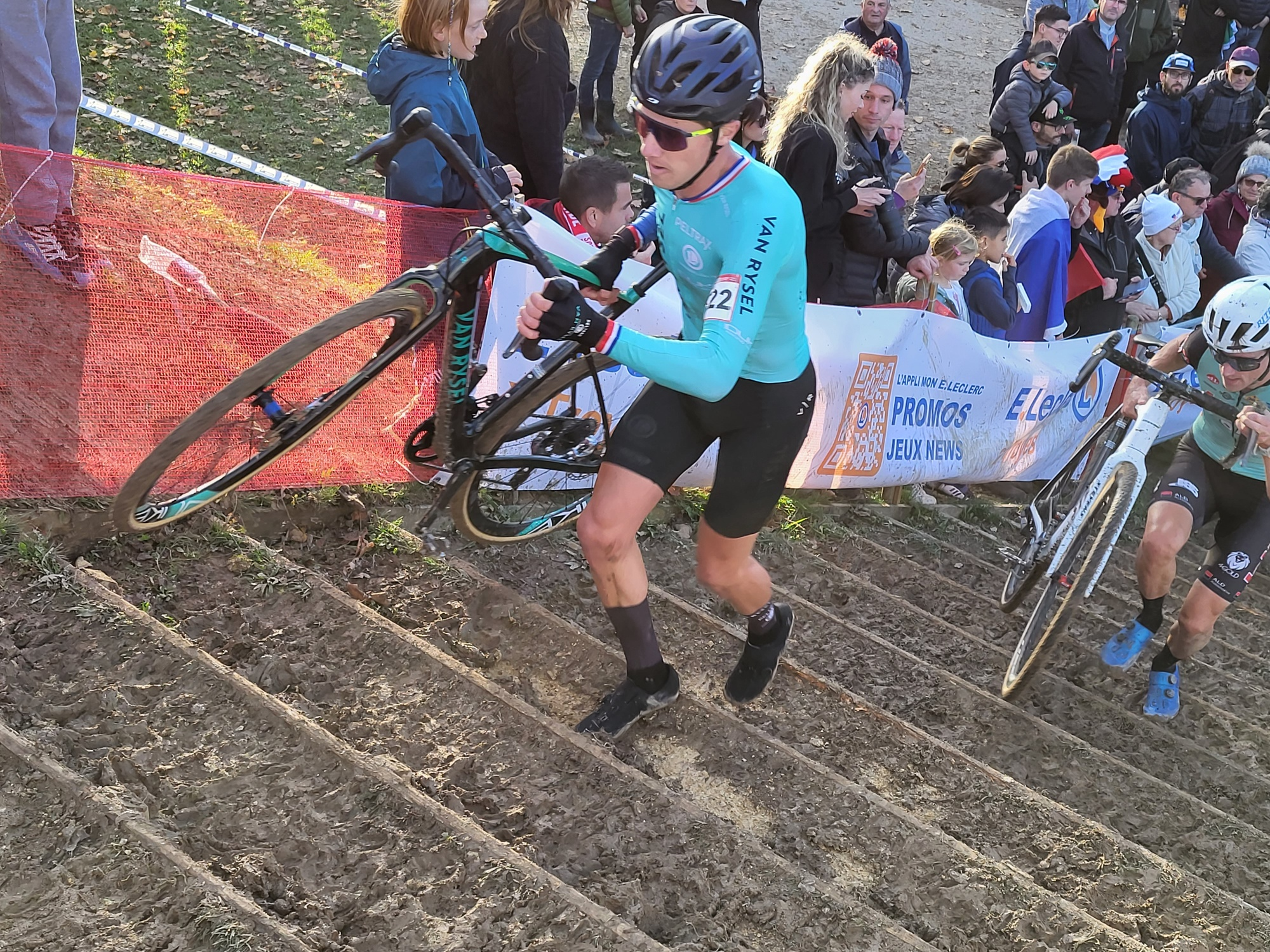
- Dubau in 2023

Personal information
- Born: 4 June 1996 (age 30) Reims, France

Cycling career
- Sport: Cycling
- Current team: Van Rysel Cross Team (cyclo-cross); Massi (MTB)
- Disciplines: Cyclo-cross; Mountain biking
- Role: Rider

Amateur teams
- 2016: AC Bazancourt-Reims
- 2017–2021: Team Peltrax–CS Dammarie-lès-Lys

Professional teams
- 2019–2020: Sunn Factory Racing (MTB)
- 2021–: Massi (MTB)
- 2023–: Van Rysel Cross Team (cyclo-cross)

Major wins
- Cyclo-cross National Championships (2022)
Medal record
Men's cyclo-cross
Representing France
World Championships
Bronze medal – third place	2025 Liévin	Team relay

Joshua Dubau (born 4 June 1996) is a French cyclist, who competes in cyclo-cross and cross-country mountain biking.

== Major results ==
=== Cyclo-cross ===
2013–2014
UCI Under-23 World Cup

2nd Valkenburg

2015–2016
1st Overall Under-23 Coupe de France

2nd Flamanville
2nd Albi

2016–2017
3rd Overall Under-23 Coupe de France

2nd Erôme Gervans

3rd National Under-23 Championships
2017–2018
1st Overall Under-23 Coupe de France

1st La Mézière
1st Besançon

2nd National Under-23 Championships
2nd Pétange
UCI Under-23 World Cup

3rd Nommay

4th UEC European Under-23 Championships
2018–2019
2nd Troyes-Rosière
Coupe de France

3rd Pierric
3rd Razès

2019–2020
1st Boulzicourt Ardennes
2nd National Championships
2nd Contern
2020–2021
2nd National Championships
2021–2022
1st National Championships
1st Overall Coupe de France

1st Quelnuec I
1st Quelnuec II
1st Pierric I
1st Bagnoles de l'Orne II
1st Troyes II
2nd Bagnoles de l'Orne I
2nd Pierric II
3rd Troyes I

1st Jablines
1st Lutterbach Pfastatt
1st Boulzicourt
2nd Pétange
3rd La Grandville
2022–2023
1st Pétange
1st Auxerre
1st La Grandville
2nd Gernelle
2nd Boulzicourt Ardennes
3rd Overall Coupe de France

2nd Camors II
2nd Nommay I

3rd National Championships
2023–2024
1st Team relay, European Championships
Coupe de France

1st Albi I
1st Flamanville I
1st Flamanville II

1st Pétange
2024–2025
Coupe de France

1st La Ferté Bernard I
3rd Pierric I
3rd Troyes I
3rd La Ferté Bernard II

2nd Pétange

=== Mountain bike ===
2018
1st Cross-country, UEC European Under-23 Championships
1st Cross-country, National Under-23 Championships
2nd Overall UCI Under-23 XCO World Cup

1st Albstadt
1st Vallnord
2nd Val di Sole

French Cup

1st Les Menuires
3rd Ussel

2019
French Cup

2nd Plœuc-l'Hermitage

3rd Short track, National Championships
2020
2nd Marathon, National Championships
2021
French Cup

1st Les Menuires
3rd Guéret

2022
French Cup

1st Guéret

3rd Short track, National Championships
2023
XCO French Cup

1st Lons-le-Saunier
2nd Guéret

UCI XCO World Cup

2nd Nové Město
4th Val di Sole
5th Les Gets

3rd Overall UCI XCC World Cup

3rd Val di Sole

2024
Swiss Bike Cup

2nd Rivera
