= Jappe Jaspers =

Belgian cyclist

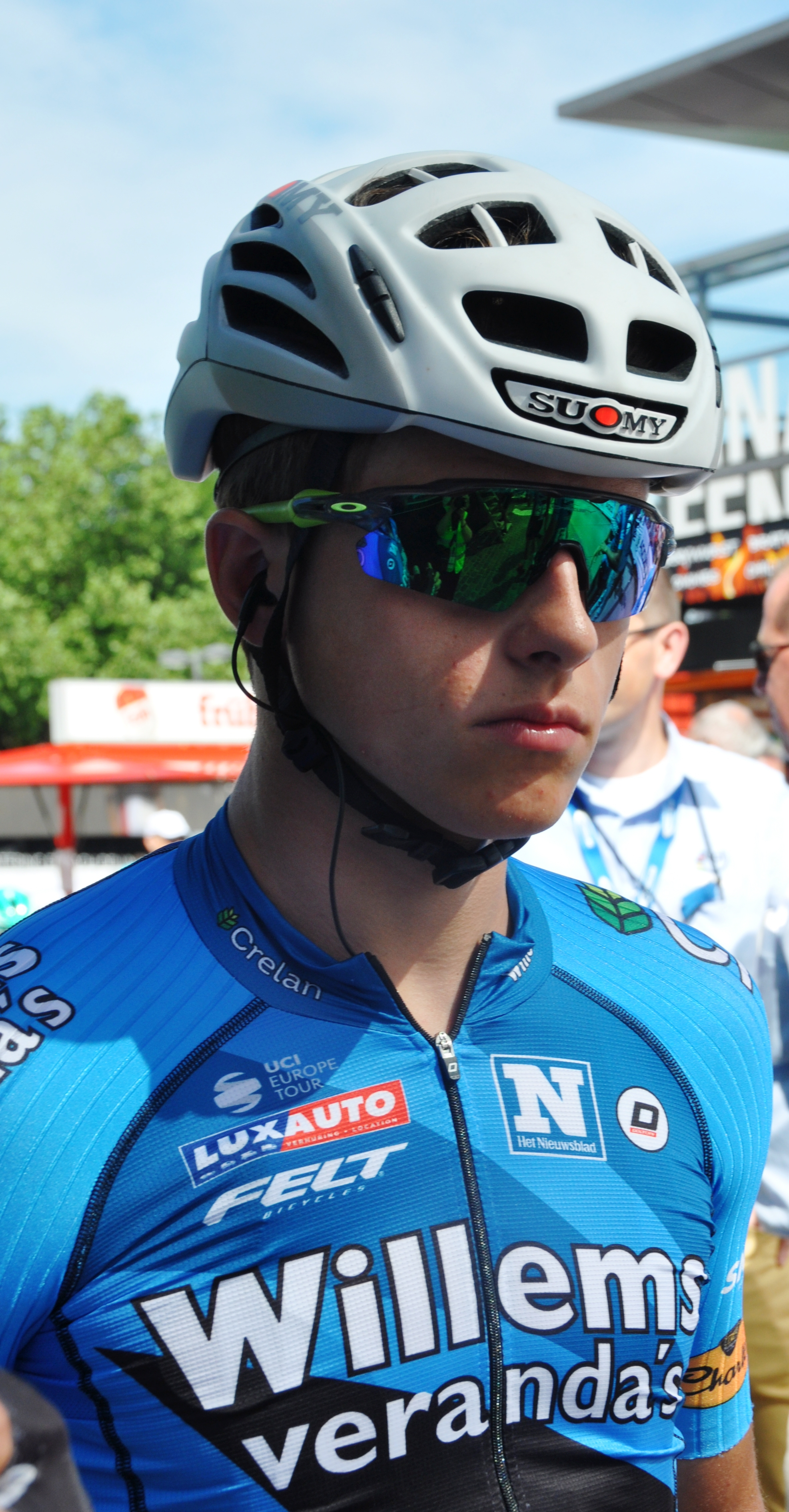
- Jappe Jaspers (2017)

Personal information
- Born: 1 September 1998 (age 28) Bonheiden, Belgium
- Height: 1.74 m (5 ft 9 in)
- Weight: 64 kg (141 lb)

Cycling career
- Sport: Cycling
- Current team: Retired
- Disciplines: Cyclo-cross, Road
- Role: Rider

Professional team
- 2017: Vérandas Willems–Crelan

Jappe Jaspers (born 1 September 1998) is a Belgian former cyclo-cross cyclist. He competed in the men's junior event at the 2016 UCI Cyclo-cross World Championships in Heusden-Zolder.

When he was 18 years old, he broke his professional contract and retired from cycling due to lack of motivation. He started an education to become a gymnastics teacher. However, after completing it, he started working out of passion as an arborist.

== Major results ==
2014–2015
1st Junior Scheldecross
Junior Bpost Bank Trofee

1st Flandriencross
3rd Ronse

2nd UEC European Junior Championships
2nd National Junior Championships
Junior Superprestige

2nd Diegem
2nd Gavere

Junior Soudal Classics

2nd Leuven

2015–2016
1st National Junior Championships
2nd Overall UCI Junior World Cup

1st Caubergcross
1st Citadelcross
2nd Duinencross
2nd Grand Prix Erik De Vlaeminck

2nd Overall Junior Superprestige

1st Diegem
1st Cyclo-cross Ruddervoorde
2nd Gavere
2nd Zonhoven
2nd Gieten

Junior Soudal Classics

1st Junior Neerpelt

1st Junior Boom
Junior Bpost Bank Trofee

2nd Flandriencross
2nd Ronse
