= Mattia Agostinacchio =

Italian cyclist

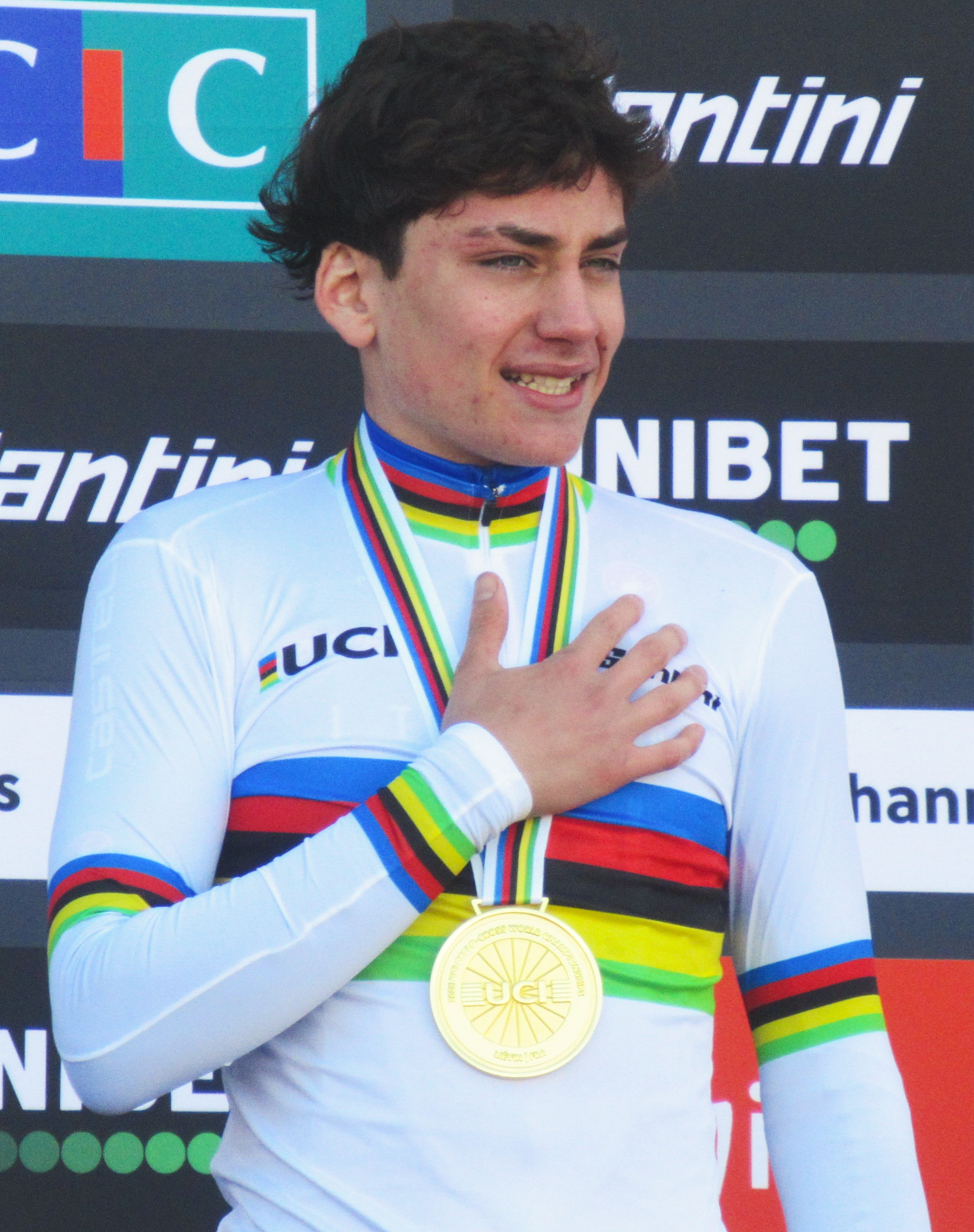
- Agostinacchio in 2025

Personal information
- Born: 13 September 2007 (age 19) Aosta, Italy

Cycling career
- Sport: Cycling
- Current team: EF Education–EasyPost
- Disciplines: Road; Cyclo-cross
- Role: Rider

Amateur team
- 2024–2025: Ciclistica Trevigliese

Professional team
- 2026–: EF Education–EasyPost

Mattia Agostinacchio (born 13 September 2007) is an Italian cyclist who currently rides for UCI WorldTeam EF Education–EasyPost. He won the junior men's race at the 2025 UCI Cyclo-cross World Championships.

== Career ==
He was a mountain biker before suffering an injury and taking up other forms of cycling. In 2023, he was selected to represent the Junior Italian national team for the first time. In November 2024, he won the junior race and finished runner-up in the U23 race at the 2024 UEC European Cyclo-cross Championships in Spain.

He won the junior men's race at the 2025 UCI Cyclo-cross World Championships in Liévin, France in February 2025.

Racing for Italian club Ciclista Trevigliese at the junior level in 2025, he won road races including the GP Liberazione Città di Massa, the Coppa Città di Cantù, and the Trofeo San Rocco. In October 2025, he signed a long term contract to ride for UCI WorldTeam EF Education–EasyPost. The following month, he won the U23 race at the 2025 UEC Cyclo-cross European Championships.

== Personal life ==
From Aosta, Italy, his older brother Filippo is also a cyclist.

== Major results ==
=== Road ===
2024
1st Gran Premio BCC Cantù
2025
1st GP Liberazione Città di Massa
1st Gran Premio BCC Cantù
1st Trofeo San Rocco
2nd Overall Trophée Centre Morbihan

1st Points classification
1st Stage 3

4th Trofeo Emilio Paganessi
5th Gran Premio del Perdono
8th Giro di Primavera
9th Time trial, UCI World Junior Championships

=== Cyclo-cross ===
2023–2024
1st Gran Premio Val Fontanabuona Juniors
2024–2025
UCI World Championships

1st Junior race
2nd Team relay

UEC European Championships

1st Junior race
1st Team relay

2nd Overall UCI Junior World Cup

1st Zonhoven
1st Benidorm
2nd Hulst

1st Junior Sint-Niklaas
1st Junior Namur
1st Junior Koksijde
1st Junior Rivellino
1st Junior Tarvisio
1st Junior Jesolo
1st Junior Salvirola
1st Junior Turin
1st Junior Dielsdorf
Junior Superprestige

2nd Gullegem
2nd Diegem

3rd Junior Brussels
2025–2026
1st UEC European Under-23 Championships
1st Due Giorni Lombarda CX di Salvirola II
2nd Due Giorni Lombarda CX di Salvirola I
2nd Zoncross Classic Sutrio
3rd Trofeo Citta' Di Firenze
