= Filippo Agostinacchio =

Italian cyclist

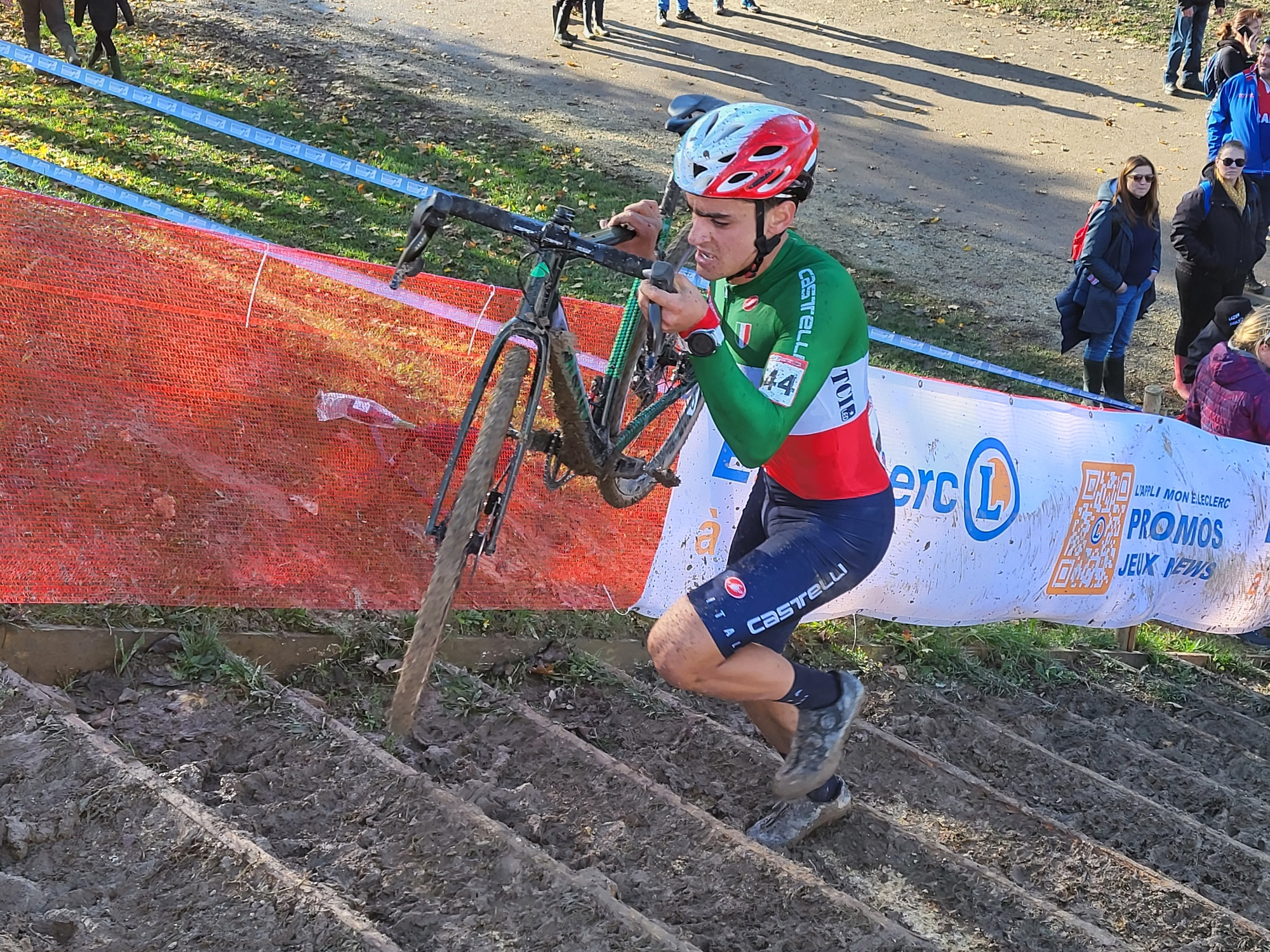
- Agostinacchio in 2023

Personal information
- Born: 26 April 2003 (age 23) Aosta, Italy
- Height: 1.75 m (5 ft 9 in)
- Weight: 66 kg (146 lb)

Cycling career
- Sport: Cycling
- Current team: Biesse–Carrera–Premac
- Disciplines: Road; Cyclo-cross; Mountain biking; Gravel
- Role: Rider

Amateur team
- 2019–2021: XCO Project

Professional teams
- 2023–2024: Beltrami TSA–Tre Colli
- 2025–: Biesse–Carrera–Premac
Medal record
Men's mountain bike racing
Representing Italy
World Championships
Silver medal – second place	2020 Leogang	Mixed relay
European Championships
Gold medal – first place	2020 Monteceneri	Mixed relay
Gold medal – first place	2021 Novi Sad	Mixed relay
Men's cyclo-cross
European Championships
Gold medal – first place	2024 Pontevedra	Mixed relay
Silver medal – second place	2024 Pontevedra	Under-23

Filippo Agostinacchio (born 26 April 2003) is an Italian cyclist, who currently rides for UCI Continental team Biesse–Carrera–Premac.

From Aosta, Italy, his younger brother Mattia is also a cyclist.

== Major results ==
=== Road ===
2024
3rd Coppa Collecchio
3rd Freccia dei Vini
2025
1st Stage 6 Giro Next Gen
1st Stage 1 Giro della Valle d'Aosta
2nd Freccia dei Vini
3rd Trofeo Città di San Vendemiano
4th Trofeo Città di Brescia
5th G.P. Palio del Recioto
6th Ruota d'Oro
7th Overall Giro della Regione Friuli Venezia Giulia
10th Giro della Provincia di Biella

=== Cyclo-cross ===
2019–2020
Junior EKZ CrossTour

1st Aigle

1st Vittorio Veneto Juniors
2nd Jesolo Juniors
2nd Faè Di Oderzo Juniors
3rd Brugherio Juniors
2022–2023
1st National Under-23 Championships
2nd Turin
2023–2024
1st National Under-23 Championships
1st San Colombano Certénoli
2nd Jesolo
3rd Faè Di Oderzo
2024–2025
UEC European Championships

1st Team relay
1st Under-23 race

1st Jesolo
2025–2026
2nd Turin International Cyclocross

=== Mountain bike ===
2020
1st Team relay, UEC European Championships
2nd Team relay, UCI World Championships

2021
1st Team relay, UEC European Championships
2022
1st Cross-country eliminator, National Championships

=== Gravel ===
2024
1st National Under-23 Championships
3rd National Championships
UCI World Series

4th Sardegna

2025
1st National Under-23 Championships
2nd National Championships
