= 2006 UEC European Cyclo-cross Championships =

The 2006 European Cyclo-cross Championships were held on 9 December 2006 in Huijbergen, Netherlands. Niels Albert managed to defend his title in the under 23 category, while Marianne Vos changed her gold medal of the 2005 edition into a bronze this year.

== Results ==
=== Seniors ===
Pos.	Names	Nation
1st place, gold medalist(s)	(Netherlands) Gerben de Knegt	(NED)
2nd place, silver medalist(s)	(Belgium) Bart Aernouts	(BEL)
3rd place, bronze medalist(s)	(Netherlands) Wilant van Gils	(NED)

=== Under 23's ===
Pos.	Names	Nation
1st place, gold medalist(s)	(Belgium) Niels Albert	(BEL)
2nd place, silver medalist(s)	(Czech Republic) Zdenek Stybar	(CZE)
3rd place, bronze medalist(s)	(Belgium) Rob Peeters	(BEL)

=== Juniors ===
Pos.	Names	Nation
1st place, gold medalist(s)	(Belgium) Vincent Baestaens	(BEL)
2nd place, silver medalist(s)	(Belgium) Joeri Adams	(BEL)
3rd place, bronze medalist(s)	(Netherlands) Ramon Sinkeldam	(NED)

=== Women ===
Pos.	Names	Nation
1st place, gold medalist(s)	(Netherlands) Daphny van den Brand	(NED)
2nd place, silver medalist(s)	(Germany) Hanka Kupfernagel	(GER)
3rd place, bronze medalist(s)	(Netherlands) Marianne Vos	(NED)

== Medal table ==
Rank	Nation	Gold	Silver	Bronze	Total
1	Belgium (BEL)	2	2	1	5
2	Netherlands (NED)	2	0	3	5
3	Czech Republic (CZE)	0	1	0	1
3	Germany (GER)	0	1	0	1
Totals (4 entries)		4	4	4	12
