= Eddy Finé =

French cyclist

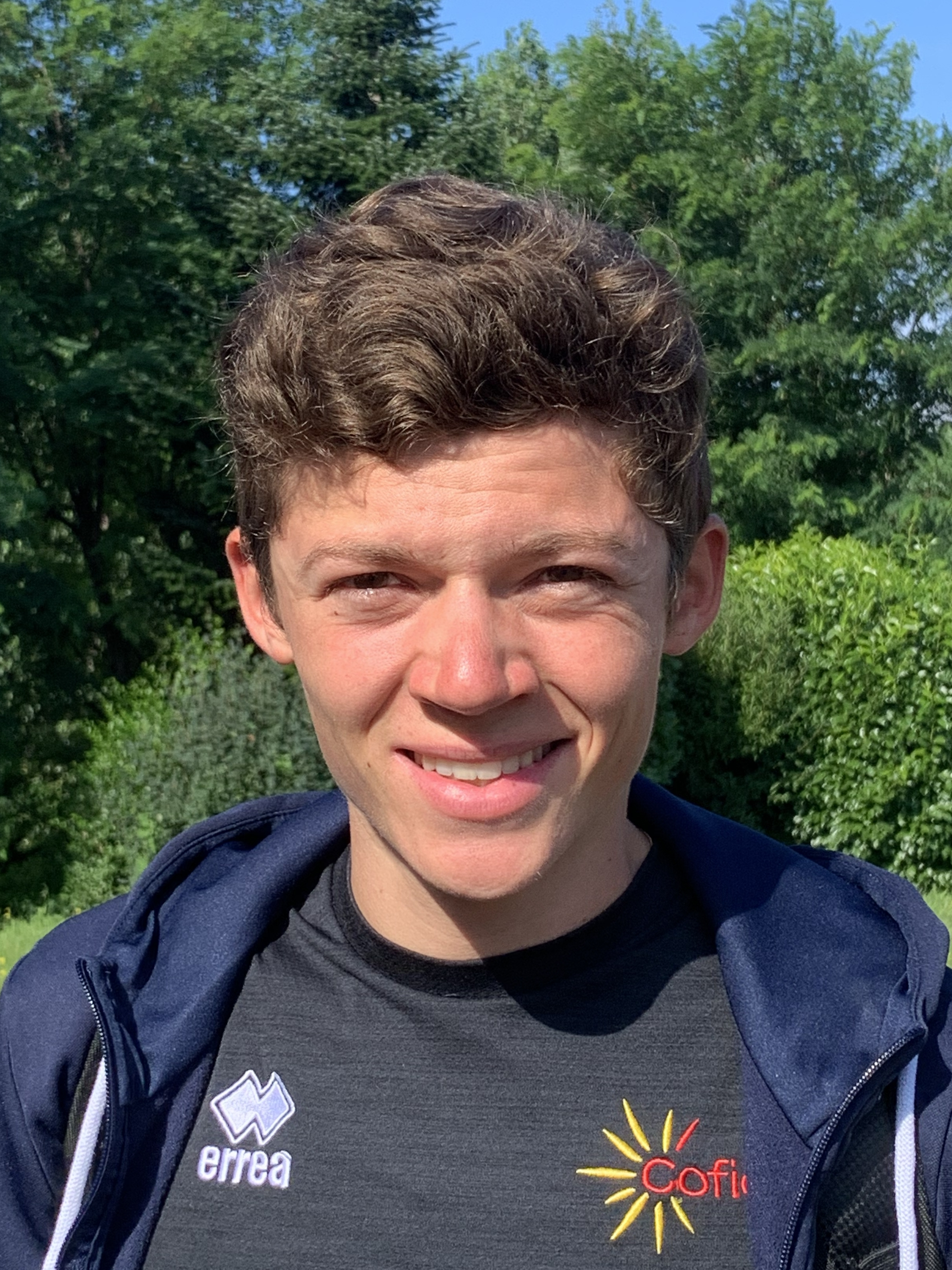
- Finé in 2021

Personal information
- Born: 20 November 1997 (age 28) Herbeys, France
- Height: 1.8 m (5 ft 11 in)
- Weight: 70 kg (154 lb)

Cycling career
- Sport: Cycling
- Current team: Retired
- Disciplines: Road; Cyclo-cross
- Role: Rider
- Rider type: Puncheur

Amateur teams
- 2016–2018: Charvieu-Chavagneux IC
- 2019: V.C.Villefranche Beaujolais
- 2019: Cofidis (stagiaire)

Professional team
- 2020–2025: Cofidis

Eddy Finé (born 20 November 1997 in Herbeys) is a French former professional cyclist, who competed for UCI WorldTeam Cofidis from 2020 to June 2025.

== Major results ==
=== Cyclo-cross ===
2014–2015
1st National Junior Championships
2nd Nommay Juniors
Junior Coupe de France

3rd Sisteron

2015–2016
Under-23 Coupe de France

3rd Flamanville

2016–2017
Under-23 Coupe de France

3rd Bagnoles-de-l'Orne

2017–2018
Under-23 Coupe de France

2nd Besançon
3rd La Meziere
3rd Jablines

2018–2019
2nd Overall Under-23 Coupe de France

1st Razès
2nd Pierric

2nd National Under-23 Championships
UCI Under-23 World Cup

2nd Bern

Under-23 DVV Trophy

2nd Koppenberg

3rd Jablines

=== Road ===
2019
1st Stage 3 Le Tour de Savoie Mont Blanc
5th Overall Tour du Jura
2022
6th Grand Prix du Morbihan
2023
4th Tro-Bro Léon
8th Grand Prix du Morbihan
8th La Roue Tourangelle

==== Grand Tour general classification results timeline ====
Grand Tour	2021
Giro d'Italia	—
Tour de France	—
Vuelta a España	92

Legend
—	Did not compete
DNF	Did not finish
