= Matthieu Boulo =

French cyclist (born 1989)

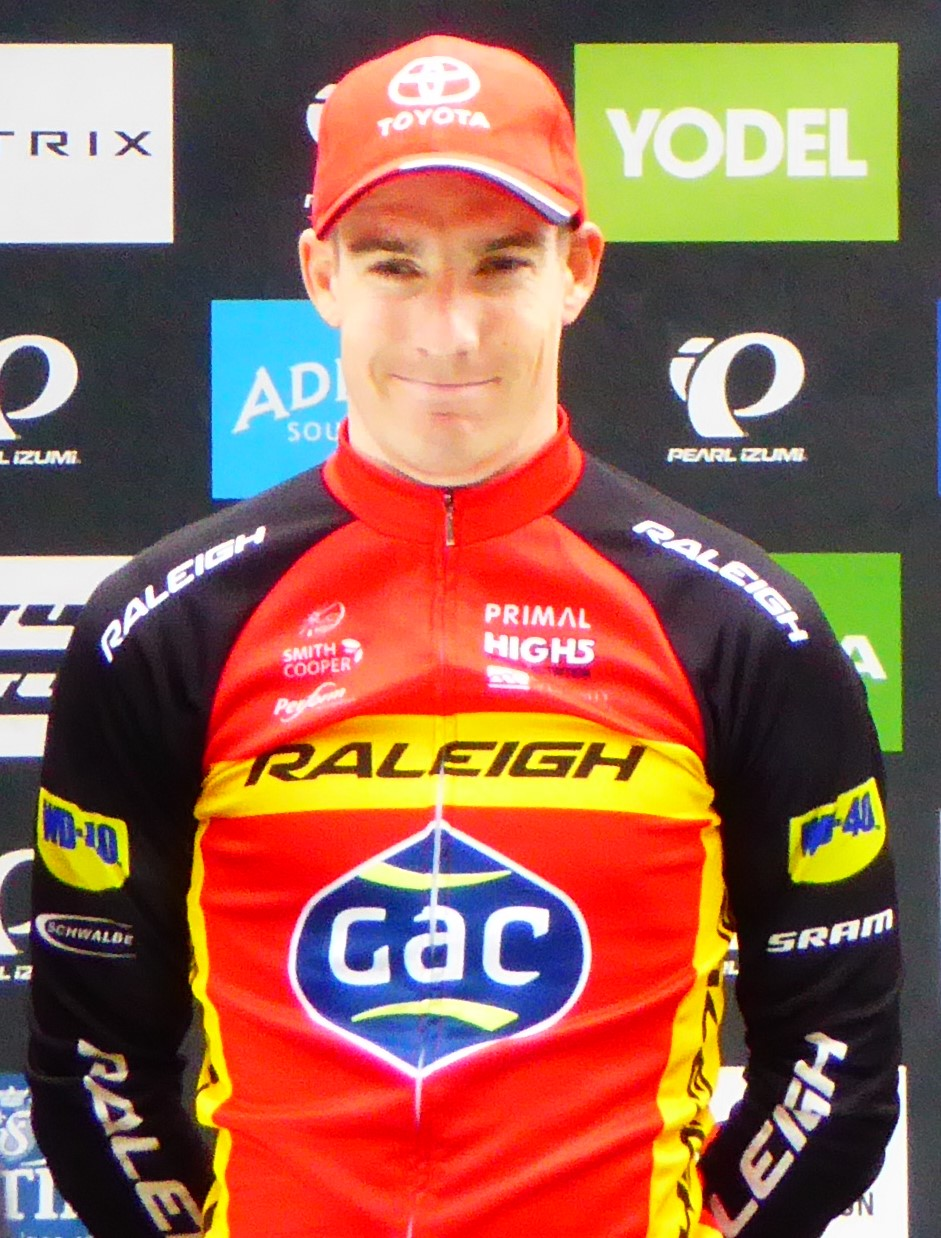
- Boulo in 2016

Personal information
- Full name: Matthieu Boulo
- Born: 11 May 1989 (age 37) Vannes, France
- Height: 1.72 m (5 ft 8 in)
- Weight: 62 kg (137 lb)

Cycling career
- Sport: Cycling
- Current team: Team Pays de Dinan
- Disciplines: Road; Cyclo-cross
- Role: Rider

Amateur teams
- 2009: AC Lanester 56
- 2016–: Team Pays de Dinan

Professional teams
- 2010–2013: Roubaix–Lille Métropole
- 2014: Team Raleigh
- 2015: Bretagne–Séché Environnement
- 2016: Team Raleigh–GAC

Matthieu Boulo (born 11 May 1989) is a French racing cyclist, who currently rides for French amateur team Team Pays de Dinan.

== Major results ==
=== Cyclo-cross ===
2006–2007
3rd National Junior Championships
2008–2009
1st Cyclocross International du Mingant Under-23
2nd National Under-23 Championships
Challenge La France Under-23

2nd Quelneuc

2009–2010
1st National Under-23 Championships
1st Overall Challenge La France Under-23

1st Besançon
1st Quelneuc
1st St-Quentin

2010–2011
1st National Under-23 Championships
2nd Overall UCI Under-23 World Cup

1st Hoogerheide
1st Pontchâteau
3rd Heusden-Zolder

2nd Caubergcross Under-23
Challenge La France

3rd Saverne

2011–2012
Challenge La France

2nd Lignières-en-Berry
2nd Rodez
3rd Besançon

2012–2013
2nd Challenge National Pontchâteau
2013–2014
3rd Mingant Lanarvily
2017–2018
3rd Trofeo Joan Soler Copa Espana
3rd Gran Premi Les Franqueses del Valles
2018–2019
1st Nittany Lion Cross 2
2nd Charm City Cross 1
2nd Nittany Lion Cross 1
2019–2020
Coupe de France

3rd Andrezieux-Boutheon

2021–2022
Coupe de France

3rd Quelneuc

=== Road ===
2010
3rd Time trial, National Under-23 Road Championships
2011
9th Overall Tour de Bretagne
10th Overall Circuit des Ardennes International
2014
4th Overall Tour de Normandie
7th Route Adélie
2016
8th Velothon Wales
