= Antoine Benoist (cyclist) =

French cyclist

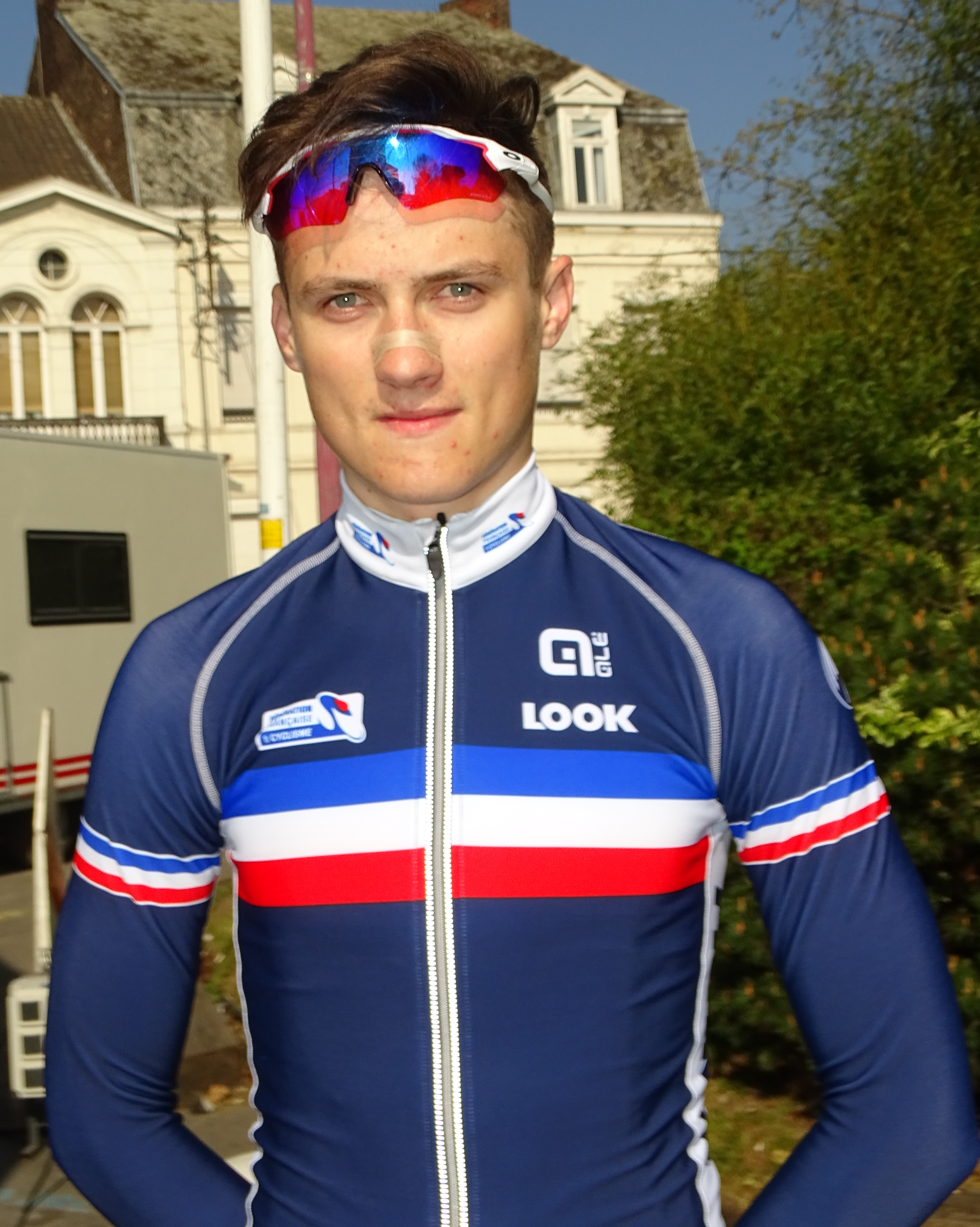
- Benoist at the 2017 Paris–Roubaix Juniors

Personal information
- Born: 6 August 1999 (age 27) Pluduno, France

Cycling career
- Sport: Cycling
- Current team: Retired
- Disciplines: Cyclo-cross; Road
- Role: Rider

Amateur team
- 2019: Corendon–Circus (stagiaire)

Professional teams
- 2018–2019: Team Chazal Canyon
- 2020: Alpecin–Fenix
- 2021: Alpecin–Fenix Development Team
- 2022: Cross Team Legendre

Antoine Benoist (born 6 August 1999) is a French former road and cyclo-cross cyclist. He retired in June 2022 due to health issues.

== Major results ==
2016–2017
1st Overall Junior Coupe de France

1st Bagnoles-de-l'Orne

2nd Overall UCI Junior World Cup

1st Rome
2nd Cauberg
2nd Namur

2nd National Junior Championships
Junior Brico Cross

2nd Kruibeke

2018–2019
1st National Under-23 Championships
1st Overall Under-23 Coupe de France

1st Pierric
1st Flamanville

3rd UCI World Under-23 Championships
3rd UEC European Under-23 Championships
3rd Overall UCI Under-23 World Cup

2nd Koksijde
2nd Pontchâteau
2nd Hoogerheide
3rd Bern
3rd Tábor

Under-23 DVV Trophy

3rd Antwerpen

2019–2020
1st National Under-23 Championships
1st Illnau
Under-23 DVV Trophy

1st Baal
2nd Brussels
2nd Lille

Under-23 Coupe de France

1st La Mézière

3rd UEC European Under-23 Championships
3rd Overall UCI Under-23 World Cup

2nd Heusden-Zolder
2nd Hoogerheide
3rd Tábor

2020–2021
Toi Toi Cup

3rd Holé Vrchy
