= Mickaël Crispin =

French cyclist

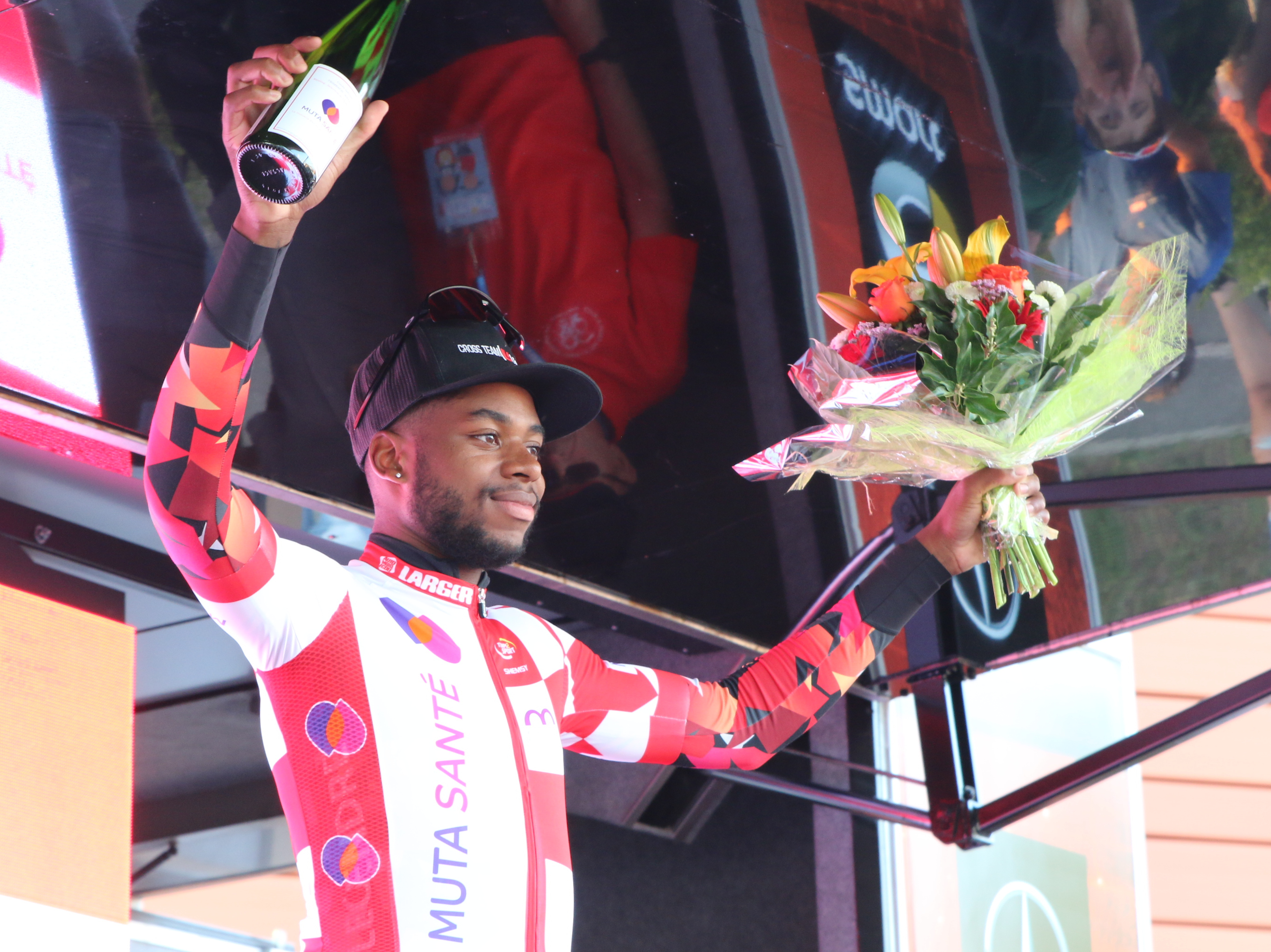

Personal information
- Born: 7 April 1998 (age 28)

Cycling career
- Sport: Cycling
- Current team: Philippe Wagner Cycling
- Discipline: Cyclo-cross
- Role: Rider

Amateur teams
- 2015–2016: Pro-Fermetures Wilier
- 2023–: Philippe Wagner Cycling

Professional team
- 2019–2023: Team Chazal–Canyon
Medal record
Representing France
Men's cyclo-cross
World Championships
Silver medal – second place	2016 Heusden-Zolder	Junior
European Championships
Gold medal – first place	2019 Silvelle	Under-23

Mickaël Crispin (born 7 April 1998) is a French cyclo-cross cyclist, who currently rides for French amateur team Philippe Wagner Cycling. In 2019 he won the U-23 European Championship, and finished second at the French U23 Championship. Throughout the same 2019-2020 season, Mickael recorded five other podium finishes in the U-23 ranks, principally competing in his native France. As a junior rider, he won the silver medal in the men's junior event at the 2016 UCI Cyclo-cross World Championships in Heusden-Zolder.

== Major results ==
=== Cyclo-cross ===
2014–2015
2nd Junior Quelneuc
2015–2016
2nd UCI World Junior Championships
1st Overall Junior Coupe de France

2nd Albi
2nd Flamanville

UCI Junior World Cup

3rd Lignières-en-Berry

2018–2019
3rd Overall Under-23 Coupe de France

3rd Flamanville

2019–2020
1st UEC European Under-23 Championships
1st Overall Under-23 Coupe de France

1st Andrezieux-Boutheon
1st Bagnoles de l'Orne
2nd La Meziere

2nd National Under-23 Championships
3rd Topolcianky
2020–2021
Toi Toi Cup

3rd Mlada Boleslav

2022–2023
2nd Auxerre
2023–2024
1st Podbrezová
1st Selce
Toi Toi Cup

2nd Kolín

3rd Ostrava

=== Road ===
2022
9th Paris–Troyes
