= 2026 UEC Cyclo-cross European Championships =

Cyclo-cross championship

- Venue: Zeddam, Netherlands
- Date: 7–8 November 2026
- Events: 6

The 2026 UEC Cyclo-cross European Championships was the 24th edition of the UEC European Cyclo-cross Championships. It was the annual edition of the European championships in the cycling discipline of cyclo-cross and was organized by the UEC on 7 and 8 November 2026 in Zeddam, in the municipality of Montferland, in the Netherlands.

Events were held for men and women, in junior, under-23 and elite classes. As in 2025, the mixed relay team event was not part of the competition.

== Schedule ==
All times are local, CET (UTC+1).

Date	Time	Race category
7 November 2026	11:00	Women's junior race
7 November 2026	13:00	Men's under-23 race
7 November 2026	15:00	Women's elite race
8 November 2026	11:00	Men's junior race
8 November 2026	13:00	Women's under-23 race
8 November 2026	15:00	Men's elite race

== Medal summary ==
Event	Gold		Silver		Bronze	
Women's events
Women's elite race	Lucinda Brand (NED)	51:37	Marie Schreiber (LUX)	+0:00	Ceylin del Carmen Alvarado (NED)	+0:17
Women's under-23 race	Célia Gery (FRA)	46:17	Lison Desprez (FRA)	+0:09	Amandine Muller (FRA)	+1:12
Women's junior race	Lentel Huys (BEL)	39:47	Shana Huber (SUI)	+0:09	Nynke Jochems (NED)	+0:17
Men's events
Men's elite race	Thibau Nys (BEL)	59:37	Joran Wyseure (BEL)	+0:07	Niels Vandeputte (BEL)	+0:19
Men's under-23 race	Aubin Sparfel (FRA)	46:58	Giel Lejeune (BEL)	+0:00	Viktor Vandenberghe (BEL)	+0:00
Men's junior race	Lars Peers (BEL)	42:22	Delano Heeren (NED)	+0:15	Bas Vanden Eynde (BEL)	+0:37

== Women's elite race ==
The elite women's race took place on Saturday 7 November 2026 over seven laps of the 2.97 km circuit. 27 riders took part. These are the results of the top 15 riders.

Marie Schreiber of Luxembourg was first across the line in a two-rider sprint against Lucinda Brand, but the race jury ruled that she had blocked Brand in the final metres and relegated her to second place, awarding the title to Brand.

Rank	Cyclist	Nation	Time	Diff.
1	Lucinda Brand	Netherlands	51:37	
2	Marie Schreiber	Luxembourg	51:37	+0:00
3	Ceylin del Carmen Alvarado	Netherlands	51:54	+0:17
4	Inge van der Heijden	Netherlands	52:34	+0:57
5	Denise Betsema	Netherlands	52:37	+1:00
6	Manon Bakker	Netherlands	52:39	+1:02
7	Kristýna Zemanová	Czech Republic	52:53	+1:16
8	Hélène Clauzel	France	52:57	+1:20
9	Aniek van Alphen	Netherlands	52:57	+1:20
10	Lucia Bramati	Italy	52:57	+1:20
11	Leonie Bentveld	Netherlands	53:05	+1:28
12	Amandine Fouquenet	France	53:31	+1:54
13	Fem van Empel	Netherlands	53:39	+2:02
14	Sara Casasola	Italy	53:41	+2:04
15	Carlotta Borello	Italy	53:48	+2:11

== Women's under-23 race ==
The under-23 women's race took place on Sunday 8 November 2026. These are the results of the top 10 riders.

Rank	Cyclist	Nation	Time	Diff.
1	Célia Gery	France	46:17	
2	Lison Desprez	France	46:26	+0:09
3	Amandine Muller	France	47:29	+1:12
4	Barbora Bukovská	Czech Republic	47:37	+1:20
5	Giorgia Pellizotti	Italy	47:56	+1:39
6	Puck Langenbarg	Netherlands	48:02	+1:45
7	Mae Cabaca	Netherlands	48:10	+1:53
8	Zélie Lambert	France	48:16	+1:59
9	Chiara Mettier	Switzerland	48:21	+2:04
10	Noï Moes	Netherlands	48:33	+2:16

== Women's junior race ==
The junior women's race took place on Saturday 7 November 2026. 48 riders took part. These are the results of the top 15 riders.

Rank	Cyclist	Nation	Time	Diff.
1	Lentel Huys	Belgium	39:47	
2	Shana Huber	Switzerland	39:56	+0:09
3	Nynke Jochems	Netherlands	40:04	+0:17
4	Karolina Rothbauerová	Czech Republic	40:22	+0:35
5	Peggy Knox	Great Britain	40:22	+0:35
6	Natália Letková	Slovakia	40:46	+0:59
7	Mathilde Leegaard	Denmark	40:47	+1:00
8	Isis Versluis	Netherlands	40:48	+1:01
9	Nicole Righetto	Italy	40:48	+1:01
10	Damy van den Bogaard	Netherlands	40:49	+1:02
11	Natalia Piróg	Poland	40:50	+1:03
12	Maxime Takken	Netherlands	41:02	+1:15
13	Lotta Huybrechts	Belgium	41:05	+1:18
14	Hana Kluckováá	Czech Republic	41:10	+1:23
15	Lonneke Heesemans	Netherlands	41:19	+1:32

== Men's elite race ==
The elite men's race took place on Sunday 8 November 2026. Thibau Nys attacked Joran Wyseure on the final lap to win his second elite European title, with Belgium taking the whole podium. These are the results of the top 15 riders.

Rank	Cyclist	Nation	Time	Diff.
1	Thibau Nys	Belgium	59:37	
2	Joran Wyseure	Belgium	59:44	+0:07
3	Niels Vandeputte	Belgium	59:56	+0:19
4	Joris Nieuwenhuis	Netherlands	59:57	+0:20
5	Kevin Kuhn	Switzerland	59:57	+0:20
6	Cameron Mason	Great Britain	59:59	+0:22
7	Felipe Orts Lloret	Spain	1:00:26	+0:49
8	Jente Michels	Belgium	1:00:32	+0:55
9	Ryan Kamp	Netherlands	1:00:34	+0:57
10	Romain Debord	France	1:00:44	+1:07
11	Thomas Mein	Great Britain	1:01:07	+1:30
12	Mees Hendrikx	Netherlands	1:01:09	+1:32
13	Michael Boroš	Czech Republic	1:01:23	+1:46
14	Witse Meeussen	Belgium	1:01:32	+1:55
15	Danny van Lierop	Netherlands	1:01:36	+1:59

== Men's under-23 race ==
The under-23 men's race took place on Saturday 7 November 2026. 40 riders took part. These are the results of the top 15 riders.

Rank	Cyclist	Nation	Time	Diff.
1	Aubin Sparfel	France	46:58	
2	Giel Lejeune	Belgium	46:58	+0:00
3	Viktor Vandenberghe	Belgium	46:58	+0:00
4	Filippo Grigolini	Italy	46:58	+0:00
5	Stefano Viezzi	Italy	47:03	+0:05
6	Mats Vanden Eynde	Belgium	47:18	+0:20
7	Kryštof Bažant	Czech Republic	47:18	+0:20
8	Yordi Corsus	Belgium	47:20	+0:22
9	Arthur van den Boer	Belgium	47:43	+0:45
10	Floris Haverdings	Netherlands	47:55	+0:57
11	Soren Bruyère Joumard	France	48:01	+1:03
12	Barnabás Vas	Hungary	48:05	+1:07
13	Alexis David	France	48:06	+1:08
14	Sil De Brauwere	Belgium	48:08	+1:10
15	Lars Daelmans	Belgium	48:16	+1:18

== Men's junior race ==
The junior men's race took place on Sunday 8 November 2026. These are the results of the top 15 riders.

Rank	Cyclist	Nation	Time	Diff.
1	Lars Peers	Belgium	42:22	
2	Delano Heeren	Netherlands	42:37	+0:15
3	Bas Vanden Eynde	Belgium	42:59	+0:37
4	Loek Hovers	Netherlands	43:18	+0:56
5	Josh Tietjen	Germany	43:24	+1:02
6	Tommaso Cingolani	Italy	43:24	+1:02
7	Ondřej Bukovský	Czech Republic	43:25	+1:03
8	Francesco Dell'Olio	Italy	43:26	+1:04
9	Antoine Clemente	France	43:29	+1:07
10	Jop van den Biggelaar	Netherlands	43:29	+1:07
11	Giovanni Bosio	Italy	43:32	+1:10
12	Aubin Favre	Switzerland	43:43	+1:21
13	Stijn van Dongen	Netherlands	43:55	+1:33
14	Enzo Conan	France	43:58	+1:36
15	Ben Fleming	Luxembourg	44:06	+1:44

== Medals table ==
* Host nation (Netherlands)

Rank	Nation	Gold	Silver	Bronze	Total
1	Belgium (BEL)	3	2	3	8
2	France (FRA)	2	1	1	4
3	Netherlands (NED)*	1	1	2	4
4	Luxembourg (LUX)	0	1	0	1
4	Switzerland (SUI)	0	1	0	1
Totals (5 entries)		6	6	6	18
