= Jérôme Chevallier =

French cyclist (1974–2025)

Personal information
- Born: 28 September 1974 Besançon, France
- Died: 18 January 2025 (aged 50) Besançon, France

Cycling career
- Sport: Cycling
- Disciplines: Road; Mountain biking; BMX; Cyclo-cross
- Role: Rider

Amateur teams
- 1999–2008: CC Étupes
- 2009–2012: AC Bisontine
- 2013–2018: VC Ornans
- 2019: ASPTT Besançon

Jérôme Chevallier (28 September 1974 – 18 January 2025) was a French cyclist. He participated in competitions in road bicycle racing, mountain biking, BMX, and cyclo-cross.

== Biography ==
Born in Besançon on 28 September 1974, Chevallier began cycling at the age of eight on BMX. He also specialized in mountain biking, particularly cross-country cycling. In 2007, he earned a bronze medal in the French National Cyclo-cross Championships. He placed behind Francis Mourey and John Gadret. By 23 November 2017, he had recorded 128 victories in a career that had started in 1999.

In road bicycle racing, Chevallier achieved great success in the 2000s. He participated in several national competitions with the team CC Étupes and won tours such as the Tour du Chablais, the Tour du Charolais, the Tour de Corrèze, and the Tour de Nouvelle-Calédonie. In 2006, he placed 897th in the 2006 UCI Europe Tour. After eight years with CC Étupes, he joined AC Bisontine after expressing a desire to join former teammate Laurent Colombatto. In 2013, he joined VC Ornans.

Chevallier died in Besançon on 18 January 2025, at the age of 50.

== Major results ==
=== Cyclo-cross ===
2003–2004
Challenge de la France

1st Sedan

2004–2005
Challenge de la France

2nd Bollène

2006–2007
Challenge de la France

2nd Blaye

3rd National Championships
2007-2008
Challenge de la France

2nd Cap d'Agde
3rd Quelneuc

=== Road ===
2001
1st Overall Tour de Nouvelle-Calédonie
2004
2nd Overall Tour Alsace
5th Grand Prix des Marbriers
2006
5th Tour du Jura
2007
1st Tour de Corrèze

=== MTB ===
2003
2nd Cross-country marathon, National Championships
2007
1st Cross-country marathon, National Championships
