= UEC European Cyclo-cross Championships =

Annual cyclo-cross championships

The jersey on the left is the old jersey given to the winner of that years European cyclo-cross championships, whilst the jersey on the right is that which has been in use since 2016. The winner of the Championships is entitled to wear the jersey in all applicable races. Riders who are also World Champion will forgo wearing the jersey in favour of the rainbow jersey.

The European Cyclo-cross Championships are organised by the Union Européenne de Cyclisme and crown the recognised European champions in the cycling discipline of cyclo-cross.

They have been held since 2003 in November, towards the start of the cyclo-cross season. Events are held for men and women, in junior, under-23 and elite classes.

A seventh medal event, a mixed relay, was held in 2023 and 2024. In 2025 the mixed relay team event was not part of the competition.

== Locations ==
Year	Country	City
2003	Czech Republic	Tábor
2004	Belgium	Vossem
2005	France	Pontchâteau
2006	Netherlands	Huijbergen
2007	Switzerland	Hittnau
2008	France	Liévin
2009	Belgium	Hoogstraten
2010	Germany	Frankfurt
2011	Italy	Lucca
2012	United Kingdom	Ipswich
2013	Czech Republic	Mladá Boleslav
2014	Germany	Lorsch
2015	Netherlands	Huijbergen
2016	France	Pontchâteau
2017	Czech Republic	Tábor
2018	Netherlands	’s-Hertogenbosch
2019	Italy	Silvelle di Trebaseleghe
2020	Netherlands	’s-Hertogenbosch
2021	Netherlands	Wijster
2022	Belgium	Namur
2023	France	Pontchâteau
2024	Spain	Pontevedra
2025	Belgium	Middelkerke
2026	Netherlands	Zeddam
2027
2028	Czech Republic	Tábor

== Palmarès ==
The full set of medalists in each race are set out below.

=== Women ===
==== Women elite ====
Held since 2003, the most successful rider in the women's elite event is the Netherlands' Daphny van den Brand with four titles, followed by Hanka Kupfernagel of Germany, Sanne Cant of Belgium and Fem van Empel from the Netherlands with three each.

Year	Gold	Silver	Bronze
2003	Hanka Kupfernagel (GER)	Marianne Vos (NED)	Maryline Salvetat (FRA)
2004	Hanka Kupfernagel (GER)	Maryline Salvetat (FRA)	Laurence Leboucher (FRA)
2005	Marianne Vos (NED)	Daphny van den Brand (NED)	Hanka Kupfernagel (GER)
2006	Daphny van den Brand (NED)	Hanka Kupfernagel (GER)	Marianne Vos (NED)
2007	Daphny van den Brand (NED)	Maryline Salvetat (FRA)	Christel Ferrier-Bruneau (FRA)
2008	Hanka Kupfernagel (GER)	Maryline Salvetat (FRA)	Kateřina Nash (CZE)
2009	Marianne Vos (NED)	Daphny van den Brand (NED)	Helen Wyman (GBR)
2010	Daphny van den Brand (NED)	Sanne van Paassen (NED)	Helen Wyman (GBR)
2011	Daphny van den Brand (NED)	Lucie Chainel-Lefèvre (FRA)	Pauline Ferrand-Prévot (FRA)
2012	Helen Wyman (GBR)	Sanne van Paassen (NED)	Nikki Harris (GBR)
2013	Helen Wyman (GBR)	Nikki Harris (GBR)	Lucie Chainel-Lefèvre (FRA)
2014	Sanne Cant (BEL)	Pavla Havlíková (CZE)	Nikki Harris (GBR)
2015	Sanne Cant (BEL)	Jolien Verschueren (BEL)	Nikki Harris (GBR)
2016	Thalita de Jong (NED)	Lucinda Brand (NED)	Caroline Mani (FRA)
2017	Sanne Cant (BEL)	Lucinda Brand (NED)	Alice Maria Arzuffi (ITA)
2018	Annemarie Worst (NED)	Marianne Vos (NED)	Denise Betsema (NED)
2019	Yara Kastelijn (NED)	Eva Lechner (ITA)	Annemarie Worst (NED)
2020	Ceylin del Carmen Alvarado (NED)	Annemarie Worst (NED)	Lucinda Brand (NED)
2021	Lucinda Brand (NED)	Blanka Vas (HUN)	Yara Kastelijn (NED)
2022	Fem van Empel (NED)	Ceylin del Carmen Alvarado (NED)	Blanka Vas (HUN)
2023	Fem van Empel (NED)	Ceylin del Carmen Alvarado (NED)	Sara Casasola (ITA)
2024	Fem van Empel (NED)	Ceylin del Carmen Alvarado (NED)	Lucinda Brand (NED)
2025	Inge van der Heijden (NED)	Lucinda Brand (NED)	Aniek van Alphen (NED)
2026	Lucinda Brand (NED)	Marie Schreiber (LUX)	Ceylin del Carmen Alvarado (NED)

Medallists by nation
Rank	Nation	Gold	Silver	Bronze	Total
1	Netherlands	16	13	8	37
2	Germany	3	1	1	5
3	Belgium	3	1	0	4
4	Great Britain	2	1	5	8
5	France	0	4	6	10
6	Italy	0	1	2	3
7	Czech Republic	0	1	1	2
7	Hungary	0	1	1	2
9	Luxembourg	0	1	0	1
Totals (9 entries)		24	24	24	72

Top multi medallists
Rank	Athlete	Gold	Silver	Bronze	Total
1	Daphny van den Brand (NED)	4	2	0	6
2	Hanka Kupfernagel (GER)	3	1	1	5
3	Fem van Empel (NED)	3	0	0	3
3	Sanne Cant (BEL)	3	0	0	3
5	Lucinda Brand (NED)	2	3	2	7
6	Marianne Vos (NED)	2	2	1	5
7	Helen Wyman (GBR)	2	0	2	4
8	Ceylin del Carmen Alvarado (NED)	1	3	1	5
9	Annemarie Worst (NED)	1	1	1	3
10	Yara Kastelijn (NED)	1	0	1	2
11	Maryline Salvetat (FRA)	0	3	1	4
12	Sanne van Paassen (NED)	0	2	0	2
13	Nikki Harris (GBR)	0	1	3	4
14	Blanka Vas (HUN)	0	1	1	2
14	Lucie Chainel-Lefèvre (FRA)	0	1	1	2

Updated after the 2026 UEC Cyclo-cross European Championships

==== Women under-23 ====
Four women have won the under-23 race twice. One of them, Ceylin del Carmen Alvarado, is the only rider to have won both the under-23 race and the elite race, while both Puck Pieterse and Célia Gery won both the under-23 and junior races. No rider has of 2026 won all three.

Year	Gold	Silver	Bronze
2013	Annefleur Kalvenhaar (NED)	Sabrina Stultiens (NED)	Alice Maria Arzuffi (ITA)
2014	Sabrina Stultiens (NED)	Martina Mikulášková (CZE)	Alice Maria Arzuffi (ITA)
2015	Maud Kaptheijns (NED)	Alice Maria Arzuffi (ITA)	Jana Czeczinkarová (CZE)
2016	Chiara Teocchi (ITA)	Hélène Clauzel (FRA)	Jana Czeczinkarová (CZE)
2017	Chiara Teocchi (ITA)	Laura Verdonschot (BEL)	Nikola Nosková (CZE)
2018	Ceylin del Carmen Alvarado (NED)	Inge van der Heijden (NED)	Fleur Nagengast (NED)
2019	Ceylin del Carmen Alvarado (NED)	Anna Kay (GBR)	Marion Norbert-Riberolle (FRA)
2020	Puck Pieterse (NED)	Kata Blanka Vas (HUN)	Manon Bakker (NED)
2021	Shirin van Anrooij (NED)	Puck Pieterse (NED)	Fem van Empel (NED)
2022	Puck Pieterse (NED)	Line Burquier (FRA)	Shirin van Anrooij (NED)
2023	Zoe Bäckstedt (GBR)	Marie Schreiber (LUX)	Kristýna Zemanová (CZE)
2024	Célia Gery (FRA)	Marie Schreiber (LUX)	Leonie Bentveld (NED)
2025	Leonie Bentveld (NED)	Célia Gery (FRA)	Amandine Muller (FRA)
2026	Célia Gery (FRA)	Lison Desprez (FRA)	Amandine Muller (FRA)

Medallists by nation
Rank	Nation	Gold	Silver	Bronze	Total
1	Netherlands	9	3	5	17
2	France	2	4	3	9
3	Italy	2	1	2	5
4	Great Britain	1	1	0	2
5	Luxembourg	0	2	0	2
6	Czech Republic	0	1	4	5
7	Belgium	0	1	0	1
7	Hungary	0	1	0	1
Totals (8 entries)		14	14	14	42

Top multi medallists
Rank	Athlete	Gold	Silver	Bronze	Total
1	Célia Gery (FRA)	2	1	0	3
1	Puck Pieterse (NED)	2	1	0	3
3	Ceylin del Carmen Alvarado (NED)	2	0	0	2
3	Chiara Teocchi (ITA)	2	0	0	2
5	Sabrina Stultiens (NED)	1	1	0	2
6	Leonie Bentveld (NED)	1	0	1	2
6	Shirin van Anrooij (NED)	1	0	1	2
8	Marie Schreiber (LUX)	0	2	0	2
9	Alice Maria Arzuffi (ITA)	0	1	2	3
10	Amandine Muller (FRA)	0	0	2	2
10	Jana Czeczinkarová (CZE)	0	0	2	2

Updated after the 2026 UEC Cyclo-cross European Championships

==== Women juniors ====
Year	Gold	Silver	Bronze
2019	Puck Pieterse (NED)	Olivia Onesti (FRA)	Shirin van Anrooij (NED)
2020	No race due to COVID-19 pandemic		
2021	Zoë Bäckstedt (GBR)	Leonie Bentveld (NED)	Nienke Vinke (NED)
2022	Lauren Molengraaf (NED)	Valentina Corvi (ITA)	Xaydee van Sinaey (BEL)
2023	Célia Gery (FRA)	Cat Ferguson (GBR)	Viktória Chladoňová (SVK)
2024	Anja Grossmann (SUI)	Barbora Bukovská (CZE)	Giorgia Pellizotti (ITA)
2025	Barbora Bukovská (CZE)	Nynke Jochems (NED)	Nicole Azzetti (ITA)
2026	Lentel Huys (BEL)	Shana Huber (SUI)	Nynke Jochems (NED)

Medallists by nation
Rank	Nation	Gold	Silver	Bronze	Total
1	Netherlands	2	2	3	7
2	Czech Republic	1	1	0	2
2	France	1	1	0	2
2	Great Britain	1	1	0	2
2	Switzerland	1	1	0	2
6	Belgium	1	0	1	2
7	Italy	0	1	2	3
8	Slovakia	0	0	1	1
Totals (8 entries)		7	7	7	21

Top multi medallists
Rank	Athlete	Gold	Silver	Bronze	Total
1	Barbora Bukovská (CZE)	1	1	0	2
2	Nynke Jochems (NED)	0	1	1	2

Updated after the 2026 UEC Cyclo-cross European Championships

=== Men ===
==== Men elite ====
Year	Gold	Silver	Bronze
2015	Lars van der Haar (NED)	Wout van Aert (BEL)	Kevin Pauwels (BEL)
2016	Toon Aerts (BEL)	Mathieu van der Poel (NED)	Wout van Aert (BEL)
2017	Mathieu van der Poel (NED)	Lars van der Haar (NED)	Toon Aerts (BEL)
2018	Mathieu van der Poel (NED)	Wout van Aert (BEL)	Laurens Sweeck (BEL)
2019	Mathieu van der Poel (NED)	Eli Iserbyt (BEL)	Laurens Sweeck (BEL)
2020	Eli Iserbyt (BEL)	Michael Vanthourenhout (BEL)	Lars van der Haar (NED)
2021	Lars van der Haar (NED)	Quinten Hermans (BEL)	Michael Vanthourenhout (BEL)
2022	Michael Vanthourenhout (BEL)	Lars van der Haar (NED)	Laurens Sweeck (BEL)
2023	Michael Vanthourenhout (BEL)	Cameron Mason (GBR)	Lars van der Haar (NED)
2024	Thibau Nys (BEL)	Felipe Orts (ESP)	Eli Iserbyt (BEL)
2025	Toon Aerts (BEL)	Thibau Nys (BEL)	Joran Wyseure (BEL)
2026	Thibau Nys (BEL)	Joran Wyseure (BEL)	Niels Vandeputte (BEL)

Medallists by nation
Rank	Nation	Gold	Silver	Bronze	Total
1	Belgium	7	7	10	24
2	Netherlands	5	3	2	10
3	Great Britain	0	1	0	1
3	Spain	0	1	0	1
Totals (4 entries)		12	12	12	36

Top multi medallists
Rank	Athlete	Gold	Silver	Bronze	Total
1	Mathieu van der Poel (NED)	3	1	0	4
2	Lars van der Haar (NED)	2	2	2	6
3	Michael Vanthourenhout (BEL)	2	1	1	4
4	Thibau Nys (BEL)	2	1	0	3
5	Toon Aerts (BEL)	2	0	1	3
6	Eli Iserbyt (BEL)	1	1	1	3
7	Wout van Aert (BEL)	0	2	1	3
8	Joran Wyseure (BEL)	0	1	1	2
9	Laurens Sweeck (BEL)	0	0	3	3

Updated after the 2026 UEC Cyclo-cross European Championships

==== Men under-23 ====
Year	Gold	Silver	Bronze
2003	Martin Zlámalík (CZE)	Martin Bína (CZE)	Steve Chainel (FRA)
2004	Lars Boom (NED)	Niels Albert (BEL)	Martin Bína (CZE)
2005	Niels Albert (BEL)	Jan Soetens (BEL)	Zdeněk Štybar (CZE)
2006	Niels Albert (BEL)	Zdeněk Štybar (CZE)	Rob Peeters (BEL)
2007	Niels Albert (BEL)	Philipp Walsleben (GER)	Lukáš Klouček (CZE)
2008	Philipp Walsleben (GER)	Aurélien Duval (FRA)	Kenneth Van Compernolle (BEL)
2009	Robert Gavenda (SVK)	Paweł Szczepaniak (POL)	Tom Meeusen (BEL)
2010	Lars van der Haar (NED)	Elia Silvestri (ITA)	Joeri Adams (BEL)
2011	Lars van der Haar (NED)	Mike Teunissen (NED)	Stan Godrie (NED)
2012	Mike Teunissen (NED)	Corné van Kessel (NED)	Julian Alaphilippe (FRA)
2013	Michael Vanthourenhout (BEL)	Mathieu van der Poel (NED)	Gianni Vermeersch (BEL)
2014	Wout van Aert (BEL)	Laurens Sweeck (BEL)	Jakub Skála (CZE)
2015	Quinten Hermans (BEL)	Daan Hoeyberghs (BEL)	Eli Iserbyt (BEL)
2016	Quinten Hermans (BEL)	Joris Nieuwenhuis (NED)	Sieben Wouters (NED)
2017	Eli Iserbyt (BEL)	Tom Pidcock (GBR)	Sieben Wouters (NED)
2018	Tom Pidcock (GBR)	Eli Iserbyt (BEL)	Antoine Benoist (FRA)
2019	Mickaël Crispin (FRA)	Timo Kielich (BEL)	Antoine Benoist (FRA)
2020	Ryan Kamp (NED)	Thomas Mein (GBR)	Cameron Mason (GBR)
2021	Ryan Kamp (NED)	Niels Vandeputte (BEL)	Thibau Nys (BEL)
2022	Emiel Verstrynge (BEL)	Thibau Nys (BEL)	Witse Meeussen (BEL)
2023	Jente Michels (BEL)	Emiel Verstrynge (BEL)	Rémi Lelandais (FRA)
2024	Jente Michels (BEL)	Filippo Agostinacchio (ITA)	Aubin Sparfel (FRA)
2025	Mattia Agostinacchio (ITA)	David Haverdings (NED)	Kay De Bruyckere (BEL)
2026	Aubin Sparfel (FRA)	Giel Lejeune (BEL)	Viktor Vandenberghe (BEL)

Medallists by nation
Rank	Nation	Gold	Silver	Bronze	Total
1	Belgium	11	10	10	31
2	Netherlands	6	5	3	14
3	France	2	1	6	9
4	Czech Republic	1	2	4	7
5	Great Britain	1	2	1	4
6	Italy	1	2	0	3
7	Germany	1	1	0	2
8	Slovakia	1	0	0	1
9	Poland	0	1	0	1
Totals (9 entries)		24	24	24	72

Top multi medallists
Rank	Athlete	Gold	Silver	Bronze	Total
1	Niels Albert (BEL)	3	1	0	4
2	Jente Michels (BEL)	2	0	0	2
2	Lars van der Haar (NED)	2	0	0	2
2	Quinten Hermans (BEL)	2	0	0	2
2	Ryan Kamp (NED)	2	0	0	2
6	Eli Iserbyt (BEL)	1	1	1	3
7	Emiel Verstrynge (BEL)	1	1	0	2
7	Mike Teunissen (NED)	1	1	0	2
7	Philipp Walsleben (GER)	1	1	0	2
7	Tom Pidcock (GBR)	1	1	0	2
11	Aubin Sparfel (FRA)	1	0	1	2
12	Martin Bína (CZE)	0	1	1	2
12	Thibau Nys (BEL)	0	1	1	2
12	Zdeněk Štybar (CZE)	0	1	1	2
15	Antoine Benoist (FRA)	0	0	2	2
15	Sieben Wouters (NED)	0	0	2	2

Updated after the 2026 UEC Cyclo-cross European Championships

==== Men juniors ====
Year	Gold	Silver	Bronze
2003	Niels Albert (BEL)	Roman Kreuziger (CZE)	Clément Lhotellerie (FRA)
2004	Julien Taramarcaz (SUI)	Ricardo van der Velde (NED)	Christoph Pfingsten (GER)
2005	Robert Gavenda (SVK)	Yannick Martinez (FRA)	Dries Govaerts (BEL)
2006	Vincent Baestaens (BEL)	Joeri Adams (BEL)	Ramon Sinkeldam (NED)
2007	Lubomír Petruš (CZE)	Arnaud Jouffroy (FRA)	Peter Sagan (SVK)
2008	Tijmen Eising (NED)	Lars van der Haar (NED)	Sean De Bie (BEL)
2009	Émilien Viennet (FRA)	Laurens Sweeck (BEL)	Michiel van der Heijden (NED)
2010	Lars Forster (SUI)	Jakub Skála (CZE)	Quentin Jaurégui (FRA)
2011	Mathieu van der Poel (NED)	Quentin Jaurégui (FRA)	Romain Seigle (FRA)
2012	Mathieu van der Poel (NED)	Clément Russo (FRA)	Yannick Peeters (BEL)
2013	Yannick Peeters (BEL)	Adam Ťoupalík (CZE)	Yan Gras (FRA)
2014	Eli Iserbyt (BEL)	Jappe Jaspers (BEL)	Johan Jacobs (SUI)
2015	Jens Dekker (NED)	Mitch Groot (NED)	Thomas Bonnet (FRA)
2016	Tom Pidcock (GBR)	Nicolas Guillemin (FRA)	Timo Kielich (BEL)
2017	Loris Rouiller (SUI)	Tomáš Kopecký (CZE)	Ben Tulett (GBR)
2018	Pim Ronhaar (NED)	Witse Meeussen (BEL)	Thibau Nys (BEL)
2019	Thibau Nys (BEL)	Jente Michels (BEL)	Dario Lillo (SUI)
2020	No race due to COVID-19 pandemic		
2021	Aaron Dockx (BEL)	David Haverdings (NED)	Luca Paletti (ITA)
2022	Léo Bisiaux (FRA)	Daniel Weis (DEN)	Guus van den Eijnden (NED)
2023	Aubin Sparfel (FRA)	Zsombor Takács (HUN)	Jules Simon (FRA)
2024	Mattia Agostinacchio (ITA)	Valentin Hofer (AUT)	Mats Vanden Eynde (BEL)
2025	Filippo Grigolini (ITA)	Patrik Pezzo Rosola (ITA)	Giel Lejeune (BEL)
2026	Lars Peers (BEL)	Delano Heeren (NED)	Bas Vanden Eynde (BEL)

Medallists by nation
Rank	Nation	Gold	Silver	Bronze	Total
1	Belgium	7	5	8	20
2	Netherlands	5	5	3	13
3	France	3	5	6	14
4	Switzerland	3	0	2	5
5	Italy	2	1	1	4
6	Czech Republic	1	4	0	5
7	Great Britain	1	0	1	2
7	Slovakia	1	0	1	2
9	Austria	0	1	0	1
9	Denmark	0	1	0	1
9	Hungary	0	1	0	1
12	Germany	0	0	1	1
Totals (12 entries)		23	23	23	69

Top multi medallists
Rank	Athlete	Gold	Silver	Bronze	Total
1	Mathieu van der Poel (NED)	2	0	0	2
2	Thibau Nys (BEL)	1	0	1	2
2	Yannick Peeters (BEL)	1	0	1	2
4	Quentin Jaurégui (FRA)	0	1	1	2

Updated after the 2026 UEC Cyclo-cross European Championships

=== Mixed ===
==== Mixed relay ====
Year	Gold	Silver	Bronze
2023	France; Aubin Sparfel; Remi Lelandais; Celia Gery; Electa Gallezot; Helene Clauzel; Joshua Dubau	Great Britain; Anna Kay; Daniel Barnes; Imogen Wolff; Oscar Amey; Cat Ferguson; Cameron Mason	Belgium; Yorben Lauryssen; Naud Declarcq; Xaydee van Sinaey; Shanyl de Schoesitter; Sanne Cant; Witse Meeussen
2024	Italy; Federico Ceolin; Mattia Agostinacchio; Lucia Bramati; Giorgia Pellizotti; Francesca Baroni; Filippo Agostinacchio	France; Théophile Vassal; Célia Gery; Lise Revol; Hélène Clauzel; Rémi Lelandais; Aubin Sparfel	Spain; Miguel Rodriguez Novoa; Benjamin Noval Suarez; Lorena Patiño Villanueva; Felipe Orts; Aroa Otero Taboas; Sofia Rodriguez Revert

Medallists by nation
Rank	Nation	Gold	Silver	Bronze	Total
1	France	1	1	0	2
2	Italy	1	0	0	1
3	Great Britain	0	1	0	1
4	Belgium	0	0	1	1
4	Spain	0	0	1	1
Totals (5 entries)		2	2	2	6

Top multi medallists
Rank	Athlete	Gold	Silver	Bronze	Total
1	Aubin Sparfel (FRA)	1	1	0	2
1	Célia Gery (FRA)	1	1	0	2
1	Hélène Clauzel (FRA)	1	1	0	2
1	Rémi Lelandais (FRA)	1	1	0	2

Updated after the 2026 UEC Cyclo-cross European Championships
