= Amandine Muller =

French cyclist (born 2006)

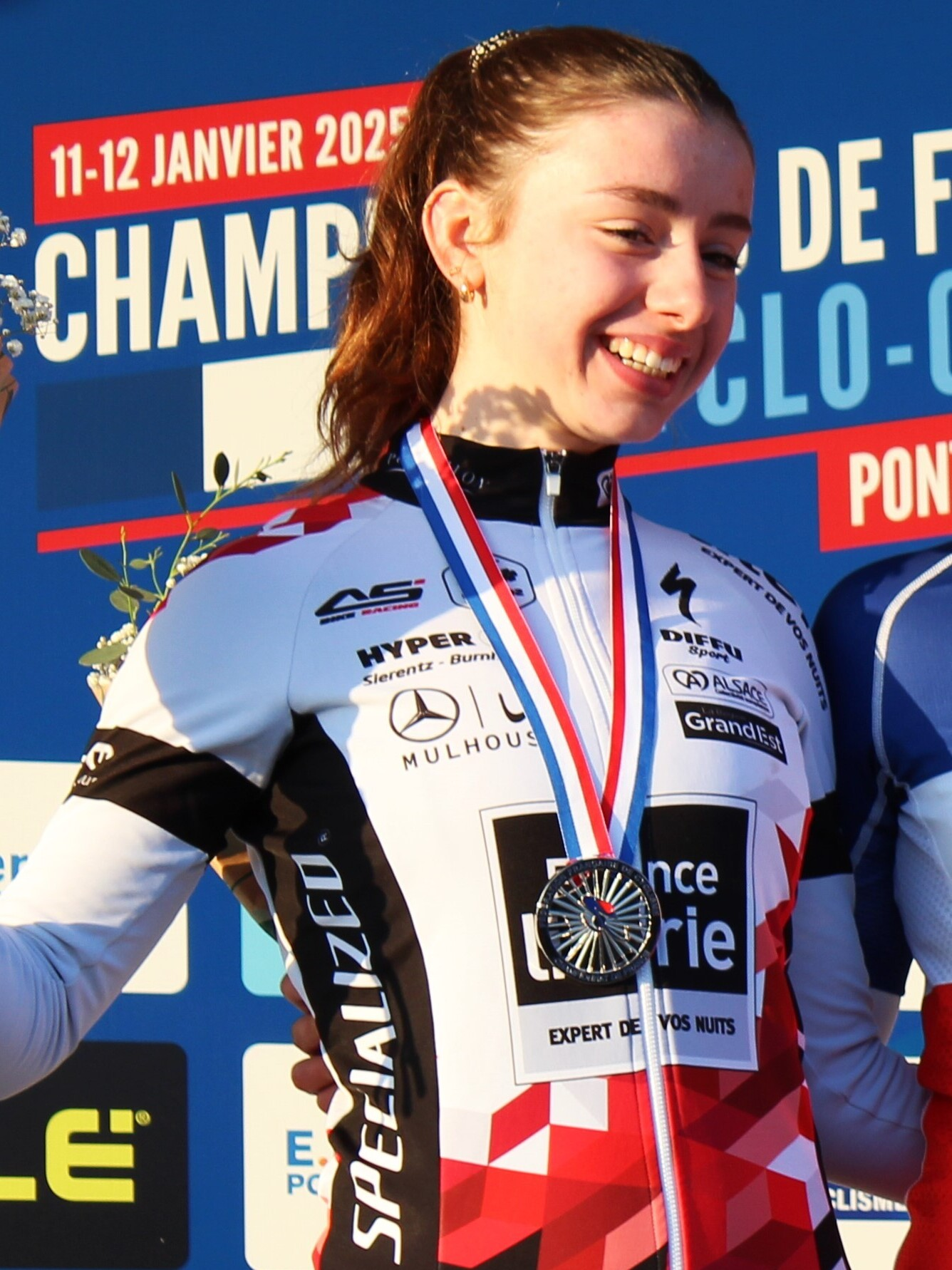
- Muller in 2025

Personal information
- Born: 16 October 2006 (age 20)

Cycling career
- Sport: Cycling
- Disciplines: Road; Cyclo-cross
- Role: Rider
Medal record
Representing France
Women's cyclo-cross
European Championships
Bronze medal – third place	2025 Middelkerke	Under-23
Bronze medal – third place	2026 Zeddam	Under-23
Women's road cycling
Mediterranean Games
Gold medal – first place	2026 Taranto	Time trial

Amandine Muller (born 16 October 2006) is a French cyclo-cross and road cyclist.

== Career ==
Muller made her UCI Cyclo-cross World Championships debut in 2025 and finished in seventh place in the under-23 race with a time of 49:41. On 14 February 2025, she underwent heart surgery that sidelined her from competition until May 2025.

In August 2025, she suffered a fractured left radius during training forcing her to delay the start of her season. In November 2025, she competed at the 2025 UEC Cyclo-cross European Championships and won a bronze medal in the under-23 race.

In January 2026, she competed at the French National Cyclo-cross Championships and won a bronze medal in the elite category. In June 2026, during the French National Road Cycling Championships, she retained her U23 time trial national title. In August 2026, she competed at the 2026 Mediterranean Games and won a gold medal in the road time trial race.

== Personal life ==
Muller comes from a cycling family, both of her parents were cyclists, along with her sister, Solène Muller.
