= Ludovic Dubau =

French cyclist

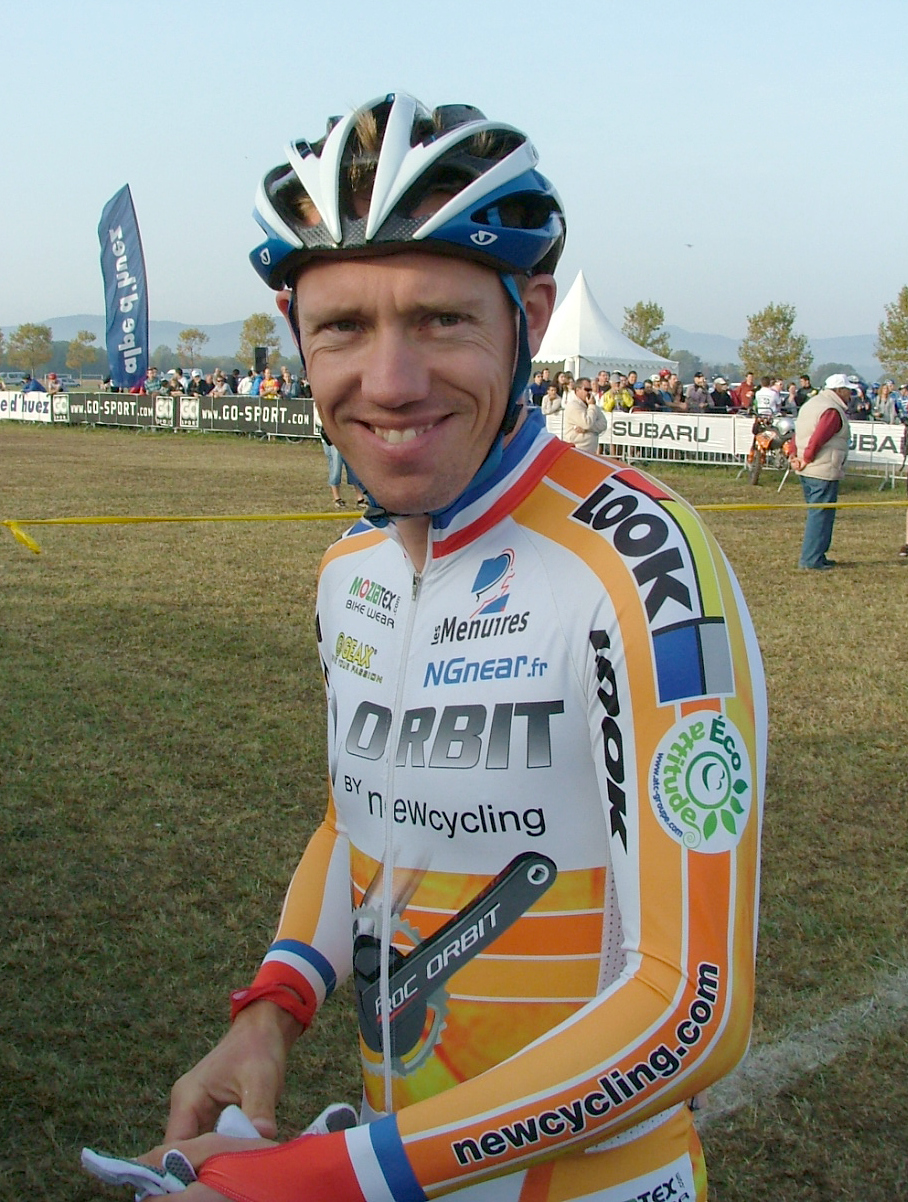
- Ludovic Dubau in 2008

Personal information
- Born: 17 November 1973 (age 52) Reims, France

Cycling career
- Sport: Cycling

Ludovic Dubau (born 17 November 1973) is a French cyclist. He competed in the men's cross-country mountain biking event at the 2000 Summer Olympics.

Dubau is the uncle of Pauline Ferrand-Prévot, the 2024 Olympic champion in cross-country mountain biking.
