= Cross Team Legendre =

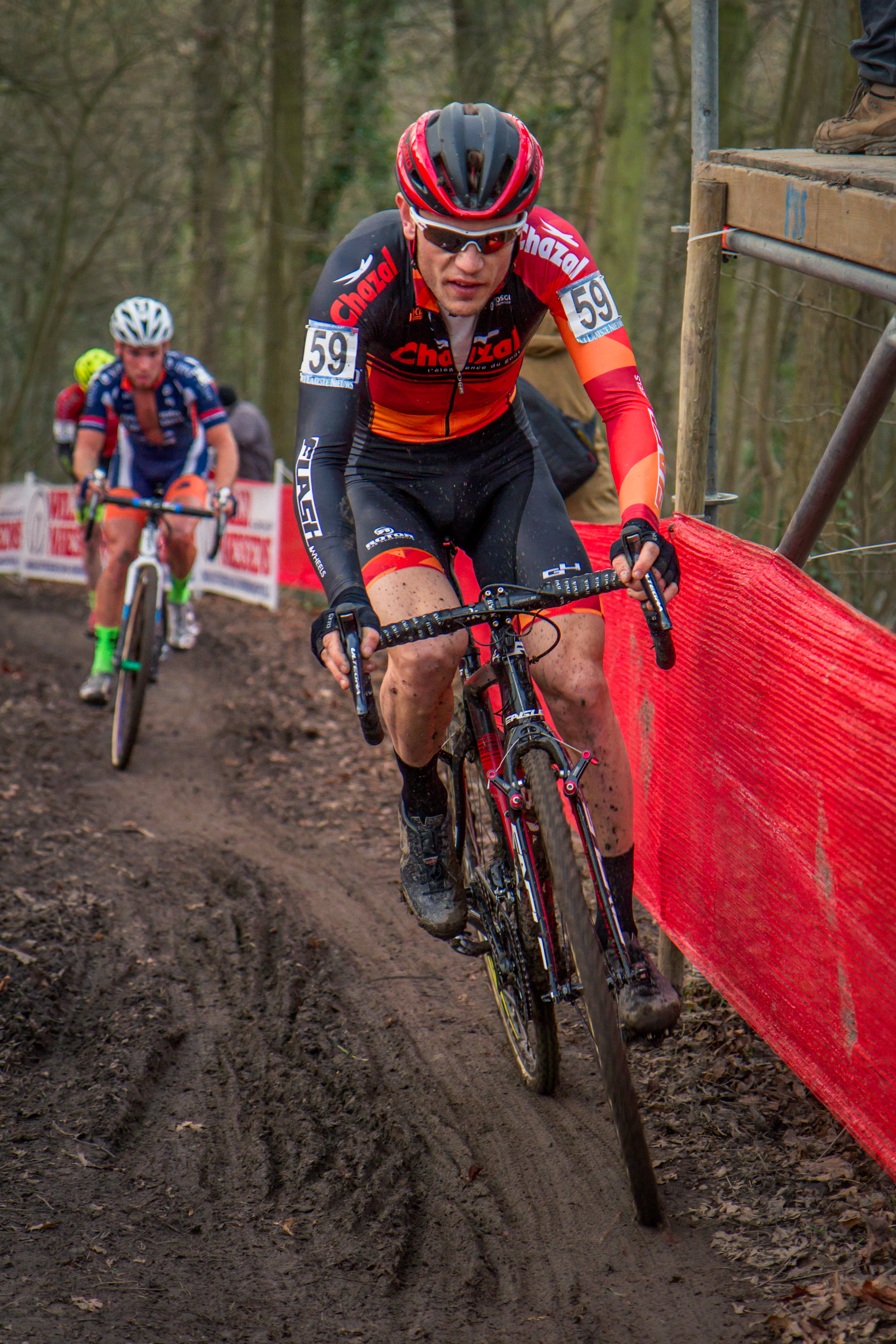
- Steve Chainel racing for the team in 2015

Team information
- UCI code: CTL
- Registered: France
- Founded: 2015
- Discipline: Cyclo-cross
- Status: UCI Cyclo-cross Pro Team
- Bicycles: Eagle (2015–2017); Canyon (2017–present)

Key personnel
- General manager: Rodolphe Beyer
- Team manager: Steve Chainel

Team name history
- 2015–2017 2017–2019 2019–2020 2021–: Cross Team by G4; Team Chazal–Canyon; Team Chazal–Canyon–3G Immo; Cross Team Legendre

Cross Team Legendre is a French professional cyclo-cross team established in 2015. The team was founded by Steve Chainel and Lucie Chainel-Lefèvre before the start of the 2015–2016 cyclo-cross season, and gained UCI Cyclo-cross Pro Team status in 2017.

== Team roster ==
As of 3 October 2021.

Rider	Date of birth
Ugo Ananie (FRA)	28 December 2002 (age 23)
Michael Boroš (CZE)	9 August 1992 (age 34)
Noé Castille (FRA)	17 November 2002 (age 23)
Steve Chainel (FRA)	6 September 1983 (age 43)
Mickael Crispin (FRA)	7 April 1998 (age 28)
Antoine Huby (FRA)	19 January 2001 (age 25)

Rider	Date of birth
Rémi Lelandais (FRA)	27 August 2002 (age 24)
David Menut (FRA)	11 March 1992 (age 34)
Gilles Mottiez (SUI)	27 March 1997 (age 29)
Timon Ruegg (SUI)	24 January 1996 (age 30)
Titouan Savignoni (FRA)	26 July 1997 (age 29)
Lilian Schneider (FRA)	9 January 2000 (age 26)
