= David Menut =

French cyclist

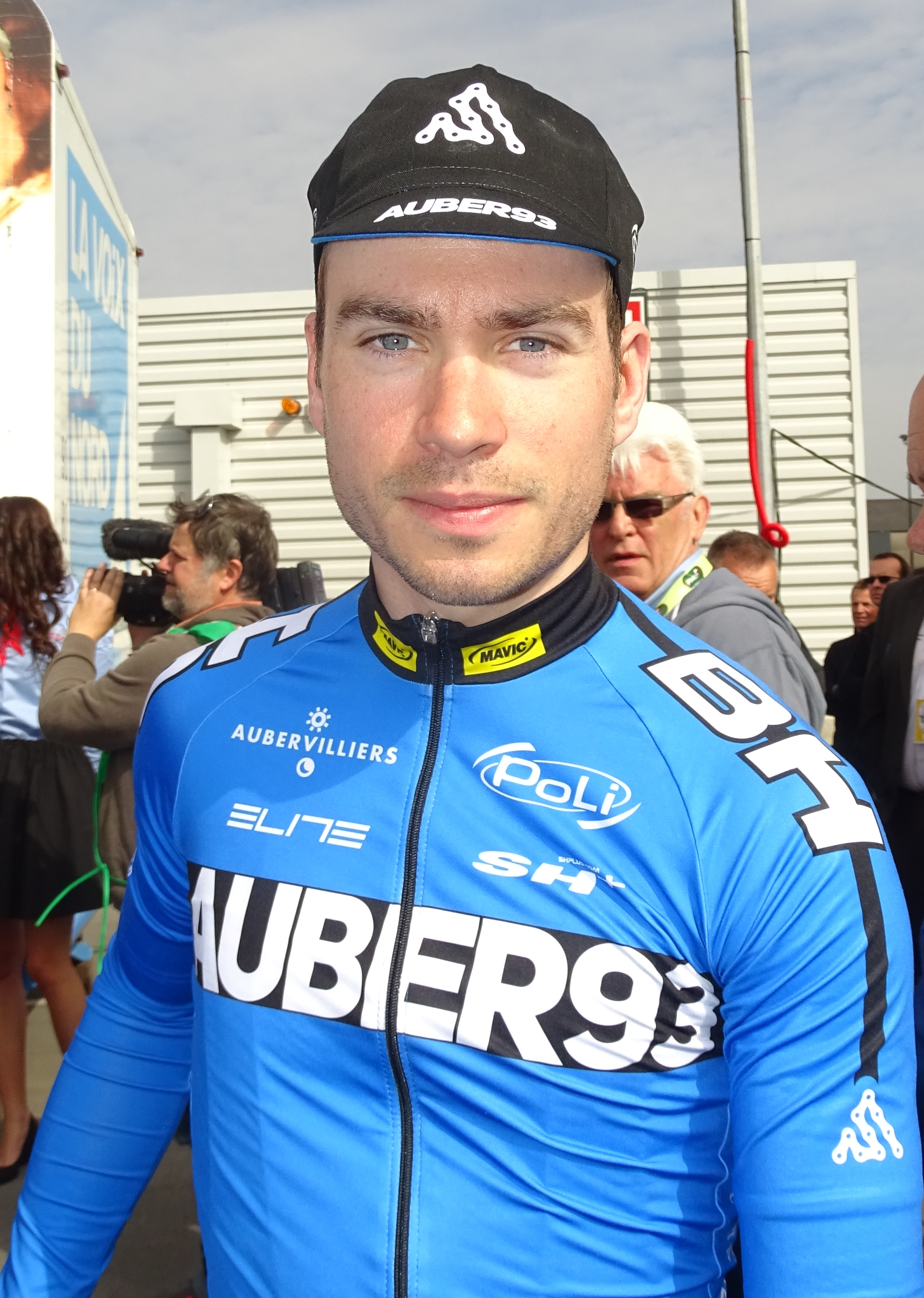
- Menut in 2015

Personal information
- Born: 11 March 1992 (age 34) Guéret, France

Cycling career
- Sport: Cycling
- Current team: AS Bike Racing (cyclo-cross); CR4C Roanne (road)
- Disciplines: Road; Cyclo-cross; Mountain biking
- Role: Rider

Amateur teams
- 2011: Creuse Oxygène
- 2012–2013: CR4C Roanne
- 2014: Armée de Terre
- 2018: Creuse Oxygène Guéret
- 2024–: CR4C Roanne

Professional teams
- 2014: BigMat–Auber 93 (stagiaire)
- 2015–2017: Auber 93
- 2019–2020: Scott Creuse Oxygène Guéret
- 2020–2022: Cross Team Legendre
- 2023–: AS Bike Racing

David Menut (born 11 March 1992) is a French cyclist, who currently rides for AS Bike Racing in cyclo-cross and club team CR4C Roanne in road cycling.

== Major results ==
=== Road ===
2014
1st Paris–Mantes-en-Yvelines
2nd Overall Tour de Gironde

1st Young rider classification

2015
1st Paris–Troyes
6th Tour de Vendée
2016
6th Cholet-Pays de Loire
8th Boucles de l'Aulne
9th Grand Prix de la Somme
10th La Roue Tourangelle
2017
4th Grand Prix de Fourmies
4th La Drôme Classic
9th Grand Prix de la ville de Pérenchies
10th Grand Prix d'Isbergues

=== Cyclo-cross ===
2009–2010
1st National Junior Championships
7th UCI World Junior Championships
2010–2011
Challenge la France

1st Saint-Jean-de-Monts

2013–2014
2nd National Under-23 Championships
7th UCI World Under-23 Championships
2014–2015
Coupe de France

3rd Sisteron

2018–2019
2nd Trofeo San Andrés
2nd Abadiñoko udala saria
3rd Overall Coupe de France

2nd Razès

3rd Troyes Cyclocross International
2019–2020
1st Overall Coupe de France

1st Bagnoles-de-l'Orne
2nd Andrezieux-Boutheon

1st Trofeo San Andres
3rd Elorrioko Basqueland Ziklokrosa
3rd Cyclo-cross des Crouchaux
2020–2021
2nd CX Täby Park
3rd National Championships
3rd Ciclo-cross Ciudad de Xàtiva
2021–2022
Coupe de France

2nd Pierric

2nd Brumath Cross Days
3rd Cyclo-cross International de la Solidarité
2022–2023
2nd Illnau
2nd Mettmenstetten
3rd Trek Cup
3rd Kleeberg
2023–2024
Coupe de France

3rd Flamanville

Swiss Cup

3rd Mettmenstetten
