= Anaïs Morichon =

French cyclist

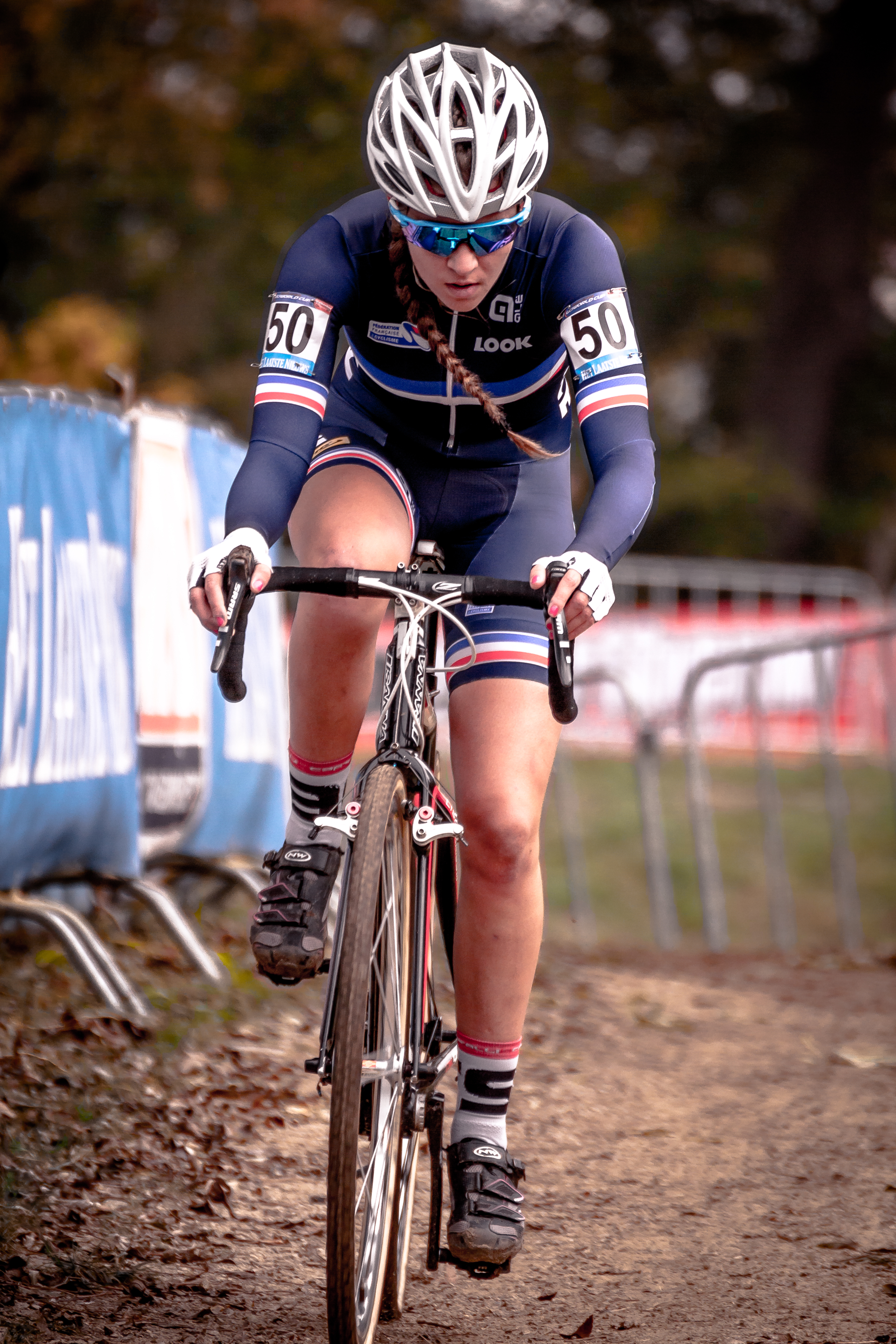
- Anaïs Morichon at the 2016 Caubergcross

Personal information
- Full name: Anaïs Morichon
- Born: 6 October 1999 (age 27)

Cycling career
- Sport: Cycling
- Current team: Team Centre-Val de Loire
- Disciplines: Road; Cyclo-cross
- Role: Rider
- Rider type: Puncheur (road)

Amateur teams
- 2016: FS Saint-Hilaire Villefranche
- 2017–2018: DN 17 Nouvelle Aquitaine
- 2021–: Team Centre-Val de Loire

Professional teams
- 2019: Charente-Maritime Women Cycling
- 2020: Arkéa Pro Cycling Team

Anaïs Morichon (born 6 October 1999) is a French racing cyclist, who currently rides for French team Arkea. Morichon was a member of the Charente-Maritime Women Cycling team from 2017 to its first UCI season in 2019.

== Cyclo-cross ==
- 2014-2015
  - 2nd French Cup cadet
- 2015-2016
  - 3rd French Cup juniors
- 2020-2021
  - GP Topoľčianky
- 2021-2022
  - Cyclo-cross international Dijon
  - Spanish cup #2, Laudio
  - 2nd French Cup
- 2022-2023
  - Cyclo-cross d'Auxerre
  - winner French Cup
    - French Cup #3, Camors
    - French Cup #4, Camors
    - French Cup #6, Troyes

== Road race ==
- 2018
  - 2nd of the 2nd stage of the La Deux-Sévrienne
- 2021
  - 2nd of the Mirabelle Classic
  - 3rd of championship Centre-Val de Loire
  - 3rd of championnat de France sur route espoirs
  - 3rd overall Tour de Charente-Maritime
    - 3rd of the 2nd stage of Tour de Charente-Maritime

=== Big race ===
==== Tour de France ====
- 2022: out of time 7 stage of Tour de France Femmes 2022
