= Zoe Roche =

British cyclist (born 2008)

Zoe Maia Roche
Personal information
- Born: 9 May 2008 (age 18) Sutton, London
- Height: 166 cm (65 in)

Cycling career
- Sport: Cycling
- Current team: Camsmajaco
- Disciplines: Cyclo-cross; Mountain biking Road
- Role: Rider

Amateur teams
- 2026: camsmajaco (Road)
- 2025–2026: Santini Cycling (CX / MTB)
- 2022–2024: Ribble-Verge Sport
- 2018–2022: WXC World Racing

Professional team
- 2026-2027: Decathlon CMA CGM Cyclocross Team

Major wins
- Cyclocross World Championship Mixed Relay 2025 – Gold British Cyclocross Junior National Champion 2025 VIA Criterium, London, 2025 – First
Medal record
Representing Great Britain
Women's cyclo-cross
World Championships
Gold medal – first place	2025 Lievin	Team relay
National Championships
Gold medal – first place	2025 Cyclopark, Kent	Junior Female
Women's Mountain Bike
UEC Youth MTB Championships
Gold medal – first place	2022 Capriasca, Switzerland	XCE U15 Female

Zoe Roche (born 9 May 2008) is a British cyclist. In 2025, she was a gold medalist at the UCI Cyclo-cross World Championships in the mixed team relay.

== Career ==
In August 2022, she won the U14 European Mountain Bike Championship XCE (Eliminator), held in Capriasca, Switzerland.

In July 2024, she finished 2nd U16 in short-track (XCC) at the British National Mountain Bike Cross-country cycling Championships.

In January 2025, she won the British Junior National Championships in Cyclo-cross at Cyclopark in Kent. That month in Lievin, France she was a member of the British team which won the gold medal in the mixed team relay at the UCI Cyclo-cross World Championships. The team, comprising Roche, Zoe Bäckstedt, Cat Ferguson, Thomas Mein, Oscar Amey, and Milo Wills became the first British team to win gold in the event. It was her debut race at the World Championships. She also competed in the Junior women's race at the same event, finishing 18th.

Roche won the Junior Female, National Trophy Series after winning three rounds in Derby, South Shields and Paignton.

On 23 February 2025, Roche represented Great Britain in cross-country mountain bike at the Shimano Super Cup where came 4th in Banyoles. Her next XC mountain bike race was in the British National Cross-country Series at Cannock, England where she came 2nd.

On 21 June 2025, Roche raced at the VIA Criterium at King's Cross, London, where she won the Elite Women's race, marking her first win in a senior road race.

In October 2025 CAMS Majaco announced that Roche would be joining the team for 2026 as a second year junior.

In January 2026, Roche placed third in the U23 race at the British National Cyclo-cross Championships having elected to race up from Juniors to Elite/U23.

Roche was the highest ranked British rider at the first Junior Nations Cup of 2026 at the Piccolo Trofeo Alfredo Binda, where she came 4th in a sprint. A week later she was 4th again at the senior women's CiCLE Classic.

In August 2026, Roche was included in the UCI cyclocross team, Decathlon CMA CGM, to compete in the 2026-27 season.

== Personal life ==
Roche is from Sutton, London. She also holds Taiwanese citizenship through her mother.

== Major results ==
Road 2026
2nd Emakume Gazteen Itzulia, 2.Ncup

1st Points Classification Winner
Stage 2 2nd
Stage 1 1st

4th Piccolo Trofeo Alfredo Binda, 1.Ncup
4th Anexo/CAMS Women's CiCLE Classic, Nat A
4th Junior National Championship, Harrogate
3rd Vuelta Cantabria (Nat Junior)

1st Mountain Classification Winner
1st Points Classification Winner
Stage 3 3rd
Stage 2 2nd
Stage 1 5th (TT)

15th III Challenge Volta Osona Femenina, Spain (1.15 2 NAT)

2nd Junior Classification
Stage 1 (TT) 16th (3rd Junior)
Stage 2 (Road) 6th ( 1st Junior & white jersey)
Stage 3 (Road) 15th (2nd Junior)

5th Kanegem GP, Belgium (1.15 A NAT)
6th City of London Nocturne, Elite Women (CRTP)
10th Ronde van Vlaanderen (1.1 Belgium)
2nd Witham Hall Junior Stage Race (National Junior Series)

Stage 1 (TT 9km) 2nd
Stage 2 (Kermesse) 1st
Stage 3 (TT uphill) 3rd
Stage 4 (Road) 1st

10th GP La Taintignoise, Belgium (NAT Junior)
15th East Cleveland Classic, Nat A
20th Liège-Bastogne-Liège Women Juniors (NAT) Belgium
21st In Flanders Fields - In Ieper (NAT) Belgium
Road 2025
12th Watersley Ladies Challenge, Junior Nations Cup

3rd Youth Classification
Stage 1 (TT) 35th
Stage 2 3rd
Stage 3 27th

1st E/1/2/3 Female, VIA Criterium, Kings Cross, London, England
7th E/1/2/3 Female, Ronde Van Wymeswold, Long Clawson, Melton Mowbray, England

1st Points Jersey Winner
Stage 1 2nd
Stage 2 10th
Stage 3 5th

4th E/1/2/3 Female, Duncan Murray Wines Road Race, Naseby, England
Mountain Bike 2025
2nd Junior Female, British National XC Series, Cannock, England
4th Junior Female, Shimano MTB Super Cup Massi, Banyoles, Spain
British National Mountain Bike Championships, Woody's, Cornwall, England

2nd Junior Female, XCC
3rd Junior Female, XCO

Cyclo-cross 2025–2026

Championships

8th Junior Female, UCI World Championship, Hulst, Netherlands
4th Mixed Team Relay, UCI World Championship, Hulst, Netherlands
3rd Women U23, British National Cyclo-cross Championship

UCI World Cup

4th Women Junior, Dendermonde, Belgium
7th Women Junior, Tabor, Czech
10th Women Junior, Flamanville, France

Telenet Superprestige

1st Women Junior, Overijes, Belgium
1st Women Junior, Gullegem, Belgium
4th Women Junior, Heusden-Zolder, Belgium

Other Races

2nd Women Junior, X2O Trophy, Leonhout, Belgium
8th Women Elite Nacht van Woerden, Netherlands

British National Cyclo-cross Trophy

1st Derby
1st Falkirk
1st Clanfield

Cyclo-cross 2024–2025
1st Team relay, UCI World Cyclo-cross Championships
18th Junior Female, UCI World Cyclo-cross Championships
1st Junior Female, British National Cyclo-cross Championships
1st Junior Female, National Cyclo-cross Trophy series

1st Derby
1st South Shields
1st Paignton

Junior Coupe de France

6th Troyes 1
6th Troyes 2
