= Cat Ferguson =

British cyclist

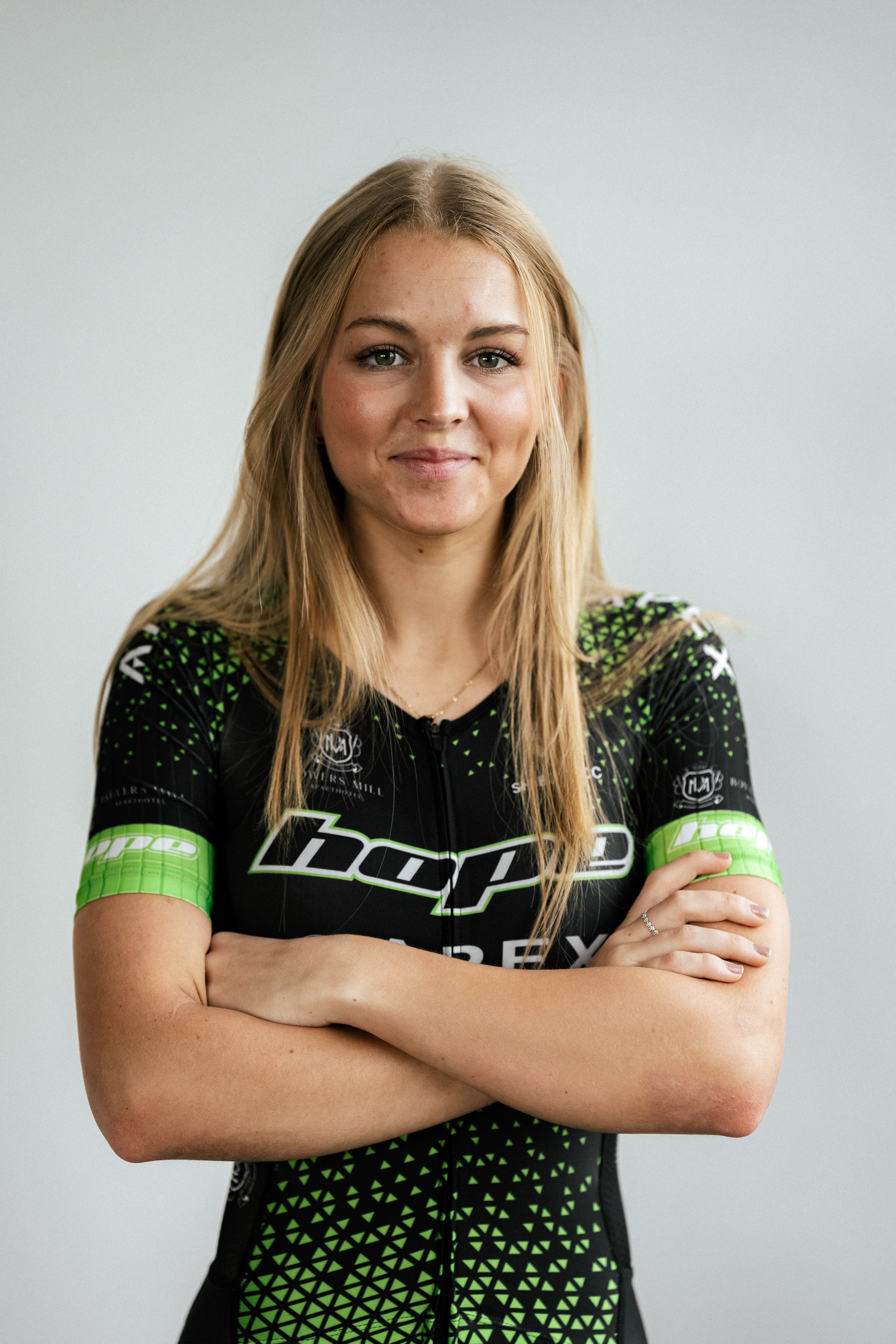
- Cat Ferguson in 2023

Personal information
- Full name: Catrin Ferguson
- Born: 27 April 2006 (age 20)
- Height: 1.66 m (5 ft 5 in)
- Weight: 55 kg (121 lb)

Cycling career
- Sport: Cycling
- Current team: Movistar Team
- Disciplines: Road; Track; Cyclo-cross
- Role: Rider

Amateur teams
- -2022: Team Storey
- 2022–2024: Shibden Hope Tech Apex

Professional teams
- 2024: Movistar Team (Stagiaire)
- 2025–: Movistar Team

Major wins
- One-day races and Classics Clásica Féminas de Navarra (2025, 2026)
Medal record
Representing Great Britain
Women's track cycling
World Junior Championships
Gold medal – first place	2024 Luoyang	Omnium
Gold medal – first place	2024 Luoyang	Team pursuit
European Junior Championships
Gold medal – first place	2024 Cottbus	Madison
Silver medal – second place	2023 Anadia	Omnium
Silver medal – second place	2024 Cottbus	Team pursuit
Bronze medal – third place	2023 Anadia	Team pursuit
Women's road bicycle racing
World Junior Championships
Gold medal – first place	2024 Zurich	Road race
Gold medal – first place	2024 Zurich	Time trial
Silver medal – second place	2023 Glasgow	Road race
European Youth Summer Olympic Festival
Gold medal – first place	2022 Banská Bystrica	Girls' TT
Gold medal – first place	2022 Banská Bystrica	Girls' road
Women's cyclo-cross
World Championships
Gold medal – first place	2025 Liévin	Team relay
Silver medal – second place	2023 Hoogerheide	Team relay
Silver medal – second place	2024 Tábor	Team relay
Silver medal – second place	2024 Tábor	Junior race
European Championships
Silver medal – second place	2023 Pontchâteau	Junior race
Silver medal – second place	2023 Pontchâteau	Team relay

Catrin "Cat" Ferguson (born 27 April 2006) is a British professional racing cyclist competing across road, cyclo-cross and track racing disciplines. She is a four-time World Junior Champion, holding four titles across two disciplines, all won in 2024. She is the 2024 Junior Track Cycling World Champion in both the team pursuit and the omnium, and the 2024 Junior Road Cycling World Champion in both the time trial and road race. She was the first cyclist to win the World Junior road double since compatriot Zoe Bäckstedt. Ferguson additionally won two silver medals at the 2024 UCI Cyclo-cross World Championships, in the women's junior race and the mixed team relay.

In 2024, she joined Movistar Team as a stagiaire before becoming a full-time member of the team in 2025.

== Early life ==
From Skipton in Yorkshire, she attended South Craven High School. She started riding mountain bikes as a child with her father on local trails in Yorkshire. From there she graduated to attending the British National School of Racing. She was also a competitive skier, specialising in slalom skiing as a youth.

== Career ==
=== 2021 ===
Ferguson won her first national title, becoming U16 National Female Road Circuit Champion, in Redbridge, London in July 2021. Later that month, Ferguson won her first national track cycling championship, clinching the U16 Madison title alongside her partner Carys Lloyd, in Glasgow.

=== 2022 ===
In January 2022, Ferguson won the British U16s Cyclocross National Championships in Crawley, Sussex.

In August 2022, she and Carys Lloyd retained their U16 National Madison title in Newport.

Ferguson was a double gold medalist at the 2022 European Youth Olympics in Banská Bystrica in July 2022, winning both the road race and time trial. That month, riding for Team Storey, she also won the British National U16 Road Racing title in Scarborough.

=== 2023 ===
In February 2023, she was a silver medalist in the junior race at the UEC European Cyclo-cross Championships in Tábor. Ferguson won a silver medal in the team relay at the 2023 UCI Cyclo-cross World Championships in Hoogerheide in a team that included Anna Kay and Zoe Backstedt.

Ferguson rode as a junior for the UK-based team Shibden Hope Tech Apex. She won on her Nations Cup road racing debut for Great Britain at the Piccolo Trofeo Alfredo Binda aged 16 years-old. She then won the junior edition 2023 Tour of Flanders for Women, and the junior British Time Trial title, in 2023. She also finished sixth at the junior Cyclo-cross World Championships.

Ferguson won a silver medal in the junior women's road race at the 2023 UCI World Road Championships in Glasgow in August 2023.

In November 2023, Ferguson won a silver medal in the Mixed Team Relay at the European Cyclo-cross Championships, alongside Cameron Mason, Anna Kay, Dan Barnes, Oscar Amey, and Imogen Wolff. She later won a second silver medal at the championships, in the junior women's race.

In late 2023 it was announced that Ferguson will join Movistar Team in 2024 as a stagiaire before becoming a full-time professional on a three-year contract. She continued to race for her British junior team Shibden Hopetech Apex during the 2023–24 winter but attended Movistar training camps while working with their performance team.

=== 2024 ===
In January 2024, Ferguson won the junior national title at the British Cyclo-cross Championships. At the 2024 UCI Cyclo-cross World Championships Ferguson won silver in both the Women's junior race and the team relay.

She won two gold medals at the 2024 UCI Junior Track Cycling World Championships in Luoyang, China. As part of the British women's team pursuit team alongside Imogen Wolff, Carys Lloyd and Erin Boothman she set a new world record time of 4:20.811 to beat France in the final. She also won the women's omnium race at the Championships in August 2024.

Following wins in the British junior road race and in Bizkaikoloreak, Ferguson made her first start as a Movistar rider in the 2024 La Choralis Fourmies Féminine, finishing second to Silvia Zanardi in a bunch sprint.

In September 2024, she won the junior time trial and road race double at the 2024 UCI Road World Championships in Zurich. Ferguson then clinched her first one day race win, taking victory in the Binche Chimay Binche pour Dames.

=== 2025 ===
She won the British under-23 women's national title and finished runner-up to Xan Crees in the elite women's race at the British Cyclocross National Championships in Gravesend in January 2025. In January 2025 in Lievin, France she was a member of the British team which won the gold medal in the mixed team relay at the UCI Cyclo-cross World Championships. The team, comprising Ferguson, Zoe Bäckstedt, Milo Wills, Thomas Mein, Oscar Amey, and Zoe Roche became the first British team to win gold in the event.

On the road, Ferguson joined the Movistar team full time, finishing 3rd at Trofeo Alfredo Binda in her first UCI Women's World Tour race. Later that year, Ferguson won Clasica Femenina Navarra in a sprint finish. In June, Ferguson took her first UCI Women's World Tour stage win at the Tour of Britain Women, finishing the race 2nd overall and taking the points and young rider classifications.

== Major results ==
=== Cyclo-cross ===
2022–2023
Junior National Trophy Series

1st Derby
1st Broughton Hall

1st Junior Andover
4th UEC European Junior Championships
2023–2024
1st National Junior Championships
UCI World Championships

2nd Team relay
2nd Junior race

2nd UEC European Junior Championships
2nd Overall UCI Junior World Cup

1st Troyes
1st Antwerpen
2nd Dublin
2nd Hoogerheide
3rd Benidorm

Junior Hope Supercross

1st Bradford
1st Houghton Le Spring

Junior National Trophy Series

1st Thornton in Craven

2024–2025
1st Team relay, UCI World Championships
2nd National Championships

=== Road ===
2023
National Junior Championships

1st Time trial
3rd Road race

UCI World Junior Championships

2nd Road race
10th Time trial

1st Piccolo Trofeo Alfredo Binda
1st Tour of Flanders Juniors
3rd Overall EPZ Omloop van Borsele Juniors

1st Points classification
1st Young rider classification

2nd Overall Bizkaikoloreak

1st Young rider classification
1st Stage 2

5th Overall Tour du Gévaudan Occitanie

1st Young rider classification
1st Stage 2

2024 (2 pro wins)
UCI World Junior Championships

1st Road race
1st Time trial

National Junior Championships

1st Road race
2nd Time trial

1st Overall Bizkaikoloreak

1st Mountains classification
1st Stages 1 & 2

1st Overall EPZ Omloop van Borsele Juniors

1st Points classification
1st Stage 1 (ITT)

1st Overall Tour du Gévaudan Occitanie

1st Stages 1 & 2

1st Binche–Chimay–Binche
1st East Cleveland Classic
1st Stage 1 Tour de la Semois
2nd Lincoln GP
2nd La Choralis Fourmies
2nd Piccolo Trofeo Alfredo Binda
2nd Tour of Flanders Juniors
3rd Otley GP
7th GP Stuttgart & Region
2025 (3)
1st Clásica Féminas de Navarra
1st Vuelta a Andalucía
2nd Overall Tour of Britain

1st Points classification
1st Young rider classification
1st Stage 3

2nd Grand Prix Stuttgart & Region
3rd Trofeo Alfredo Binda
9th Brabantse Pijl
10th Overall Simac Ladies Tour
2026 (3)
1st Clásica Féminas de Navarra
1st Trofeo Llucmajor
1st Stage 1 Setmana Ciclista Valenciana
3rd Vuelta a la Comunitat Valenciana
4th Omloop Het Nieuwsblad
6th Dwars door Vlaanderen

=== Track ===
2023
UEC European Junior Championships

2nd Omnium
3rd Team pursuit

2024
UCI World Junior Championships

1st Team pursuit
1st Omnium

1st Madison, UEC European Junior Championships (with Carys Lloyd)
3rd Scratch, National Championships
2025
3rd Points race, National Championships
