= Oscar Amey =

British cyclist (born 2007)

Personal information
- Born: 28 December 2007 (age 18)

Cycling career
- Sport: Cycling
- Current team: WWV Hagens Berman-Jayco
- Discipline: Cyclo cross
- Role: Rider

Amateur teams
- 2024: Tekkerz CC
- 2025–: WWV Hagens Berman-Jayco
Medal record
Representing Great Britain
Men's cyclo-cross
World Championships
Gold medal – first place	2025 Lievin	Team relay

Oscar Amey (born 28 December 2007) is a British cyclist. In 2025, he was a gold medalist at the UCI Cyclo-cross World Championships in the mixed team relay.

== Career ==
In 2024, he won the British National Junior cyclo cross trophy series. In 2024 and 2025, he won the British junior national cyclo cross championship.

In January 2025 in Lievin, France he was a member of the British team which won the gold medal in the mixed team relay at the UCI Cyclo-cross World Championships. The team, comprising Amey, Zoe Bäckstedt, Cat Ferguson, Thomas Mein, Milo Wills, and Zoe Roche became the first British team to win gold in the event.

In January 2026, Amey placed second behind Ben Askey in the U23 race at the British National Cyclo-cross Championships.

== Personal life ==
His brother Alfie is also a cyclist.

== Major results ==
2023–2024
1st National Junior Championships
1st Overall Junior National Trophy Series

1st Derby
2nd South Shields
2nd Gravesend
2nd Bradford
3rd Paignton

2024–2025
1st Team relay, UCI World Championships
1st National Junior Championships
1st Overall Junior National Trophy Series

1st Derby
1st South Shields
1st Paignton

UCI Junior World Cup

3rd Besançon

Junior Exact Cross

3rd Loenhout

Junior Coupe de France

3rd Troyes I

2025–2026
2nd National Under-23 Championships
