= Milo Wills =

British cyclist (born 2008)

Personal information
- Born: 12 May 2008 (age 18)

Cycling career
- Sport: Cycling
- Current team: WWV Hagens Berman–Jayco
- Discipline: Cyclo cross
- Role: Rider

Amateur team
- 2025–: WWV Hagens Berman–Jayco
Medal record
Representing Great Britain
Men's cyclo-cross
World Championships
Gold medal – first place	2025 Lievin	Team relay

Darlison Milo Wills (born 12 May 2008) is a British cyclist who rides for WWV Hagens Berman–Jayco. In 2025, he was a gold medalist at the UCI Cyclo-cross World Championships in the mixed team relay.

== Career ==
He won the British National U16 cyclo cross championship in 2024. In 2025, he was runner-up to Oscar Amey at the British junior national cyclo cross championship.

In January 2025 in Lievin, France he was a member of the British team which won the gold medal in the mixed team relay at the UCI Cyclo-cross World Championships. The team, comprising Wills, Zoe Bäckstedt, Cat Ferguson, Thomas Mein, Oscar Amey, and Zoe Roche became the first British team to win gold in the event. It was his debut race at the World Championships. He came tenth in the Men's Junior race at the same championships.

== Major results ==
=== Cyclo-cross ===
2024–2025
1st Team relay, UCI World Championships
2nd National Junior Championships

=== Road ===
2025
1st Ilkley, National Circuit Series
