= 2023 UCI Road World Championships – Women's junior road race =

Cycling event

Women's junior road race
2023 UCI Road World Championships

Race details
- Dates: 5 August 2023
- Distance: 70 km (43.50 mi)
- Winning time: 1:54:53

Medalists
	Gold	Julie Bego (FRA)
	Silver	Cat Ferguson (GBR)
	Bronze	Fleur Moors (BEL)

The women's junior road race of the 2023 UCI Road World Championships was a cycling event that took place on 5 August 2023 in Glasgow, Scotland.

== Final classification ==
Of the race's 98 entrants, 75 riders completed the full distance of 70 kilometres (43 mi).

Rank	Rider	Country	Time	Behind
1st place, gold medalist(s)	Julie Bego	France	1:54:53	+0
2nd place, silver medalist(s)	Cat Ferguson	Great Britain	1:55:02	+9
3rd place, bronze medalist(s)	Fleur Moors	Belgium	s.t.	s.t.
4	Federica Venturelli	Italy	s.t.	s.t.
5	Imogen Wolff	Great Britain	1:55:05	+12
6	Titia Ryo	France	s.t.	s.t.
7	Celia Gery	France	s.t.	s.t.
8	Isabella Holmgren	Canada	1:55:08	+15
9	Mackenzie Coupland	Australia	s.t.	s.t.
10	Xaydee Van Sinaey	Belgium	1:55:10	+17
11	Elyne Roussel	France	s.t.	s.t.
12	Viktoria Chladoňova	Slovakia	s.t.	s.t.
13	Awen Roberts	Great Britain	1:55:13	+20
14	Alberte Greve	Denmark	1:56:01	+1:08
15	Carys Lloyd	Great Britain	1:57:29	+2:36
16	Isabel Sharp	Great Britain	1:57:38	+2:45
17	Hannah Kunz	Germany	s.t.	s.t.
18	Sara Piffer	Italy	s.t.	s.t.
19	Talia Appleton	Australia	s.t.	s.t.
20	Tabea Huys	Austria	s.t.	s.t.
21	Ema Comte	France	s.t.	s.t.
22	Lauren Molengraaf	Netherlands	s.t.	s.t.
23	Kamilla Aasebo	Norway	s.t.	s.t.
24	Anina Hutter	Switzerland	s.t.	s.t.
25	Bella Eleonora La	Italy	1:57:45	+2:52
26	Jule Markl	Germany	s.t.	s.t.
27	Lore De Schepper	Belgium	s.t.	s.t.
28	Zoe Van Velzen	Netherlands	1:57:52	+2:59
29	Pia Grunewald	Germany	1:57:56	+3:03
30	Lara Liehner	Switzerland	1:59:09	+4:16
31	Stina Kagevi	Sweden	1:59:47	+4:54
32	Lucy Benezet Minns	Ireland	2:00:00	+5:07
33	Marta Pavesi	Italy	2:00:31	+5:38
34	Fee Knaven	Netherlands	2:00:56	+6:03
35	Ida Krickau Ketelsen	Denmark	s.t.	s.t.
36	Puck Langenbarg	Netherlands	s.t.	s.t.
37	Luca Vierstraete	Belgium	2:01:44	+6:51
38	Juliana Londoño	Colombia	2:01:46	+6:53
39	Martyna Szczesna	Poland	s.t.	s.t.
40	Alexandra Volstad	Canada	2:01:49	+6:56
41	Nela Kaňkovska	Czech Republic	s.t.	s.t.
42	Angie Londoño	Colombia	2:02:55	+8:02
43	Makala Jaramillo	United States	2:03:02	+8:09
44	Ella Heremans	Belgium	2:03:15	+8:22
45	Kateřina Douděrova	Czech Republic	2:03:20	+8:27
46	Violeta Hernandez Diaz	Spain	s.t.	s.t.
47	Aline Epp	Switzerland	2:03:29	+8:36
48	Bonnie Rattray	New Zealand	s.t.	s.t.
49	Maayan Tal	Israel	2:03:34	+8:41
50	Aine Doherty	Ireland	2:05:05	+10:12
51	Silje Bader	Netherlands	2:05:19	+10:26
52	Tina Rucker	Germany	2:05:28	+10:35
53	Barbara Cywinska	Poland	2:06:29	+11:36
54	Nora Linton	Canada	2:07:01	+12:08
55	Ella Sabo	United States	2:08:21	+13:28
56	Valeria Ponomarenko	Ukraine	2:08:22	+13:29
57	Natalia Alonso Alonso	Spain	2:08:31	+13:38
58	Astrid Marie Sorensen	Denmark	2:08:47	+13:54
59	Ella Brenneman	United States	s.t.	s.t.
60	Olympia Norrid-Mortensen	Denmark	s.t.	s.t.
61	Maia Barclay	New Zealand	s.t.	s.t.
62	Laia Bosch Ballus	Spain	2:09:19	+14:26
63	Anika Visser	South Africa	2:09:29	+14:36
64	Lesly Yulieth Aguirre Malagon	Colombia	2:09:33	+14:40
65	Felicity Wilson-Haffenden	Australia	2:10:34	+15:41
66	Marta Marek	Poland	s.t.	s.t.
67	Sara Pestotnik	Slovenia	s.t.	s.t.
68	Raquel Dias	Portugal	s.t.	s.t.
69	Ema Podberšič	Slovenia	s.t.	s.t.
70	Martha Stokkeland	Norway	s.t.	s.t.
71	Maria Guadalupe Nava Hinojosa	Mexico	s.t.	s.t.
72	Daniela Simao	Portugal	s.t.	s.t.
73	Ruby Spring	New Zealand	2:11:26	+16:33
74	Skaistė Mikašauskaitė	Lithuania	2:12:06	+17:13
75	Matilde Skjelde	Norway	2:12:27	+17:34

Rank	Rider	Country	Time	Behind
	Samantha Scott	United States	DNF	
	Eloise Camire	Canada	DNF	
	Ayala Serrano Manso	Spain	DNF	
	Georgia Simpson	New Zealand	DNF	
	Yuliia Pchelintseva	Ukraine	DNF	
	Maria Klamut	Poland	DNF	
	Costa E Silva Mayra Da	Brazil	DNF	
	Patience Effiong Otuodung	Nigeria	DNF	
	Terezia Ciriakova	Slovakia	DNF	
	Mariate Byukusenge	Rwanda	DNF	
	Aline Uwera	Rwanda	DNF	
	Nelia Kabetaj	Albania	DNF	
	Jessica Fuller	Zimbabwe	DNF	
	Anna Ržoncova	Slovakia	DNF	
	Neža Zupanič	Slovenia	DNF	
	Adela Pernicka	Czech Republic	DNF	
	Mia Gjertsen	Norway	DNF	
	Mayte Zamudio Garcia	Mexico	DNF	
	Malak Mechab	Algeria	DNF	
	Edith Marcela Salazar Gomez	Mexico	DNF	
	Eden Spangenberg	Namibia	DNF	
