= Stefano Viezzi =

Italian cyclist (born 2005)

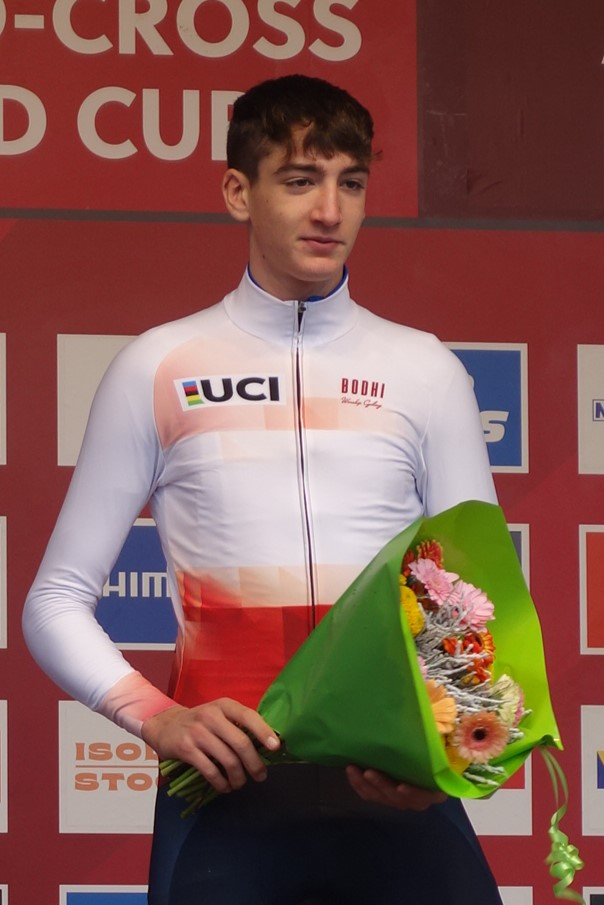

Personal information
- Born: 5 February 2006 (age 20)

Cycling career
- Sport: Cycling
- Current team: Alpecin–Premier Tech Development Team
- Disciplines: Cyclo-cross; Mountain biking; Road
- Role: Rider

Amateur teams
- 2023: Team Tiepolo Udine Cycling ASD
- 2024: Work Service Team Coratti

Professional team
- 2025–: Alpecin–Deceuninck Development Team
Medal record
Men's cyclo-cross
Representing Italy
World Championships
Gold medal – first place	2024 Tábor	Junior
Silver medal – second place	2025 Liévin	Team relay
Silver medal – second place	2026 Hulst	Team relay

Stefano Viezzi (born 5 February 2006) is an Italian cyclist, who rides for UCI Continental team Alpecin–Premier Tech Development Team. In 2024, he became the Junior Cyclo-Cross World Champion.

== Early life ==
He started bike racing at seven years-old. He studies agriculture at the Istituto d'Istruzione Superiore Il Tagliamento in Spilimbergo.

== Career ==
A keen road racer, cyclocross rider and also mountain biking rider, he has described his road racing skills as best suited to one-day classics riding. He raced for Work Service–Vitalcare–Dynatek in 2023 and finished in the top 10 at the Italian junior time trial championship. He won seven of the first eight cyclo cross races he took part in 2023, and finished fourth in the junior event at the UEC European Cyclo-cross Championships in Pontchâteau.

He won the Junior race at the 2024 UCI Cyclo-cross World Championships in Tábor. The win came despite the fact he suffered a puncture in the closing stages. He became the first Italian winner in the race since Davide Malacarne in 2005. Prior to that win, he had also become the Italian junior champion.

== Personal life ==
From Majano, his parents are called Luigi and Michela. His father runs a marble company. He has two sisters, Elisa and Alice.

== Major results ==
=== Cyclo-cross ===
2022–2023
2nd National Junior Championships
2023–2024
1st UCI World Junior Championships
1st National Junior Championships
1st UCI Junior World Cup

1st Troyes
1st Dublin
1st Hoogerheide
2nd Antwerpen
4th Namur

Superprestige

3rd Diegem

3rd Junior Oostmalle
4th UEC European Junior Championships
2024–2025
1st National Under-23 Championships
UCI Under-23 World Cup

3rd Hoogerheide
5th Benidorm

4th UCI World Under-23 Championships
2025–2026
Under-23 X²O Badkamers Trophy

2nd Koppenberg
3rd Lille

UCI Under-23 World Cup

3rd Tábor
3rd Flamanville
4th Hoogerheide
5th Benidorm
