= Julie Bego =

French cyclist (born 2005)

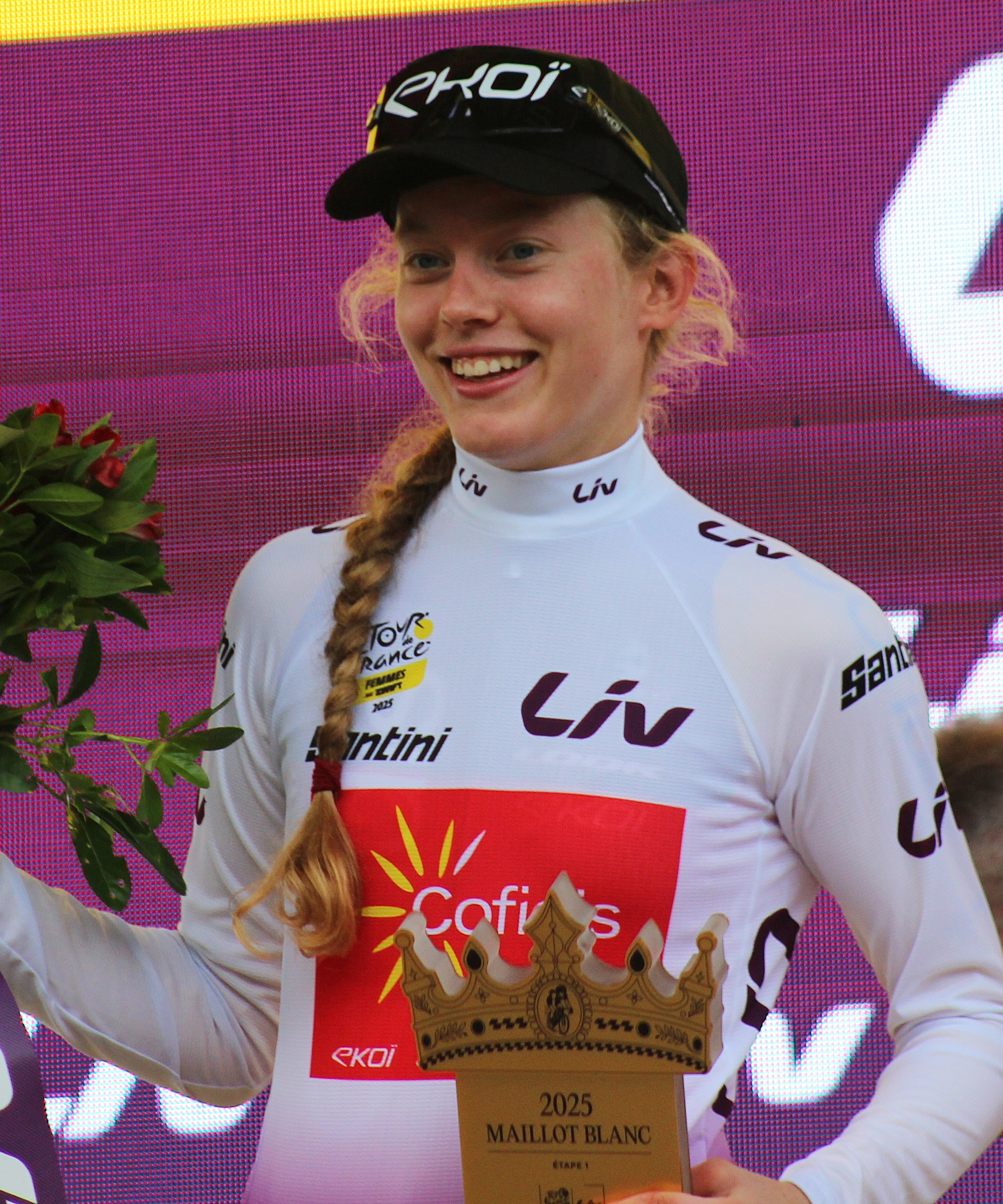
- Bego at 2025 Tour de France Femmes

Personal information
- Born: 9 January 2005 (age 21) Bourgoin-Jallieu, France

Cycling career
- Sport: Cycling
- Current team: Cofidis
- Disciplines: Road; Cyclo-cross
- Role: Rider

Amateur team
- 2021–2023: Team Féminin Chambéry

Professional teams
- 2023: Cofidis (stagiaire)
- 2024–: Cofidis
Medal record
Representing France
Women's road bicycle racing
World Championships
Gold medal – first place	2023 Glasgow	Junior road race
European Championships
Bronze medal – third place	2023 Drenthe	Junior team relay
Bronze medal – third place	2025 Guilherand-Granges	Under-23 road race

Julie Bego (born 9 January 2005) is a French professional racing cyclist, who currently rides for UCI Women's Continental Team Cofidis.

== Major results ==
=== Road ===
2022
3rd Time trial, National Junior Championships
6th Overall Bizkaikoloreak

1st Young rider classification

2023
UCI World Junior Championships

1st Road race
9th Time trial

1st Overall Bizkaikoloreak

1st Mountains classification
1st Stage 2

2nd Overall Tour du Gévaudan Occitanie
2nd Piccolo Trofeo Alfredo Binda
3rd Team relay, UEC European Junior Championships
10th Ronde van Vlaanderen Juniors
2024
3rd Alpes Grésivaudan Classic
4th Trofeo Oro in Euro
5th Overall Tour de l'Avenir
5th Clasica Femenina Navarra
7th Overall Tour Féminin International des Pyrénées

1st Young rider classification

2025
Tour de France

Held after Stages 1–6

=== Cyclo-cross ===
2021–2022
3rd National Junior Championships
2022–2023
Junior Coupe de France

1st Nommay I
3rd Nommay II
3rd Camors II

2nd National Junior Championships
2023–2024
Coupe de France

2nd Albi II
