= 2025 UCI Cyclo-cross World Championships =

Cyclo-cross championship

- Location within France
- Venue: Liévin, France
- Date: 31 January – 2 February 2025
- Coordinates: 50°25′22″N 2°46′43″E
- Events: 6

The 2025 UCI Cyclo-cross World Championships was the 76th edition of UCI Cyclo-cross World Championships. It was the annual edition of the world championships in the cycling discipline of cyclo-cross and was organized by UCI between 31 January and 2 February 2025 in Liévin, in France.

== Venue ==
Location of the 2025 UCI Cyclo-cross World Championships

On 18 October 2023 it was announced that Liévin will host the 2025 World Championships. The event was organized in the Val de Souchez park just outside Liévin. It was held at the site of Cyclo-cross Liévin, which had earlier hosted National Championships and 2008 European Cyclo-cross Championships and had been used to organize UCI Cyclo-cross World Cup four times in the past; last time being during the 2011–12 UCI Cyclo-cross World Cup. However, this was the first time the World Championships were held in Liévin.

The course had a length of 2.95 km and an elevation of 68 m.

== Competition schedule ==
All times are local, CET (UTC+1).

Date	Time	Race Category
31 January 2025	12:30	Mixed team relay
1 February 2025	11:00	Women's junior race
1 February 2025	13:00	Men's under-23 race
1 February 2025	15:00	Women's elite race
2 February 2025	11:00	Men's junior race
2 February 2025	13:00	Women's under-23 race
2 February 2025	15:00	Men's elite race

== Medal summary ==
Event	Gold		Silver		Bronze	
Women's events
Women's elite race	Fem van Empel (NED)	54' 29"	Lucinda Brand (NED)	+18"	Puck Pieterse (NED)	+1' 09"
Women's under-23 race	Zoe Bäckstedt (GBR)	45' 42"	Marie Schreiber (LUX)	+39"	Leonie Bentveld (NED)	+1' 20"
Women's junior race	Lise Revol (FRA)	45' 25"	Barbora Bukovská (CZE)	+11"	Rafaelle Carrier (CAN)	+1' 43"
Men's events
Men's elite race	Mathieu van der Poel (NED)	1h 02' 44"	Wout van Aert (BEL)	+45"	Thibau Nys (BEL)	+1' 06"
Men's under-23 race	Tibor Del Grosso (NED)	56' 26"	Kay De Bruyckere (BEL)	+56"	Jente Michels (BEL)	+1' 05"
Men's junior race	Mattia Agostinacchio (ITA)	45' 47"	Soren Bruyère Joumard (FRA)	+12"	Filippo Grigolini (ITA)	+30"
Mixed events
Mixed team relay	Great Britain; Zoe Backstedt; Darlison Milo Wills; Maia Zoe Roche; Oscar Amey; Cat Ferguson; Thomas Mein	50' 03"	Italy; Mattia Agostinacchio; Gioele Bertolini; Giorgia Pellizotti; Lucia Bramati; Sara Casasola; Stefano Viezzi	+2"	France; Jules Simon; Florian Fery; Célia Gery; Zélie Lambert; Hélène Clauzel; Joshua Dubau	+5"

== Start order ==
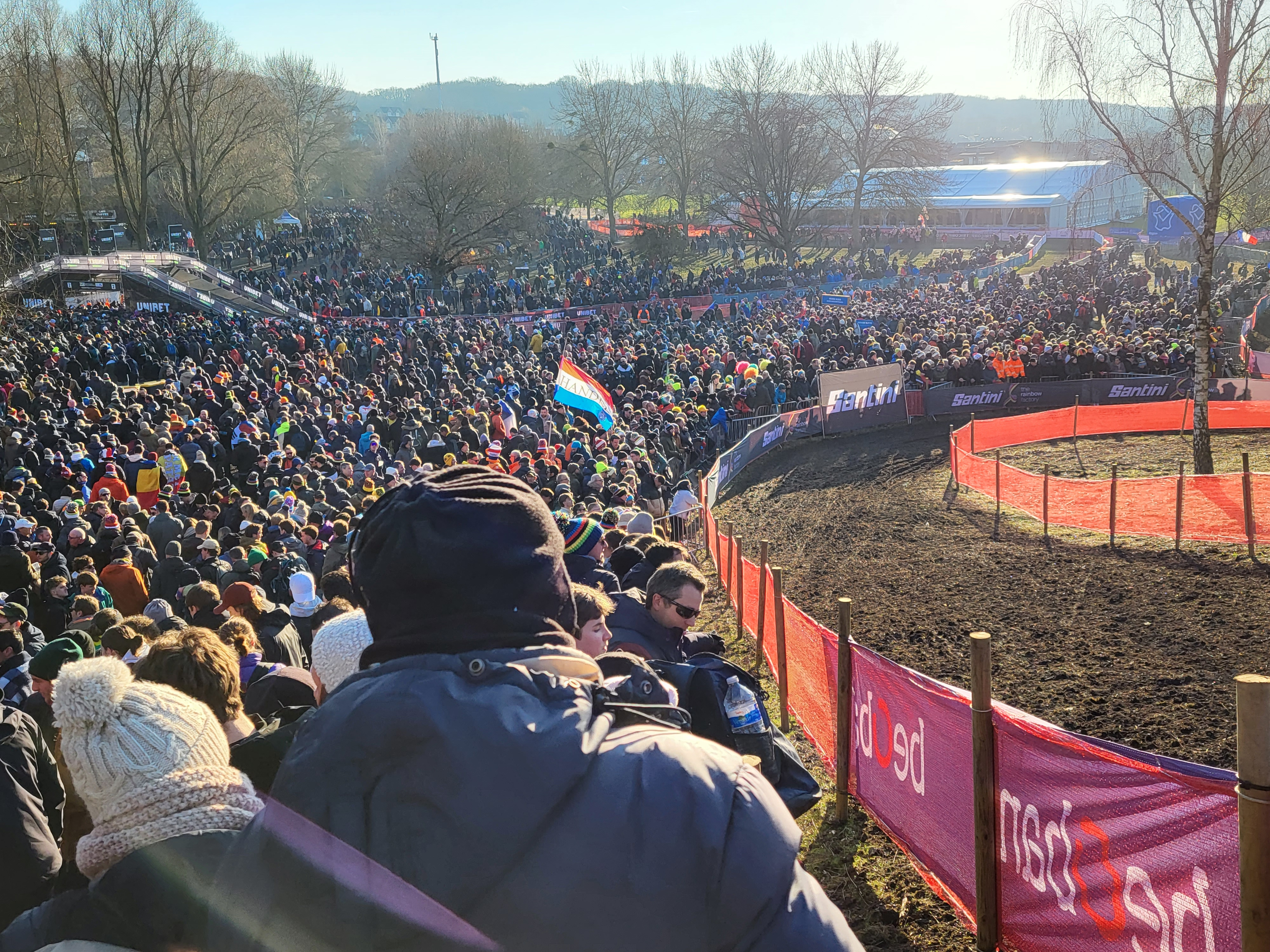
Spectators along the race route

During the start, the riders were positioned in the rows containing 8 riders each. The row in which a rider was positioned was determined from the front row to the back based on the ranking of the riders in the 2024–25 UCI Cyclo-cross World Cup and other UCI rankings. The riders that finished up to the place 16 in the final World Cup classification started on the first two rows. After those the rest of the riders were positioned based on their latest UCI Cyclo-cross ranking. For Elite riders the places from 33 to 40 (5th start row) were allocated to the riders in the top 10 of the UCI mountain bike cross country ranking or the top 20 of the UCI road ranking.

== Results ==
=== Women ===
==== Elite ====
The Elite Women's race took place on Saturday 1 February 2025 in 6 laps over a total distance of 16.95 km. 35 riders from 12 nations took part in the race.

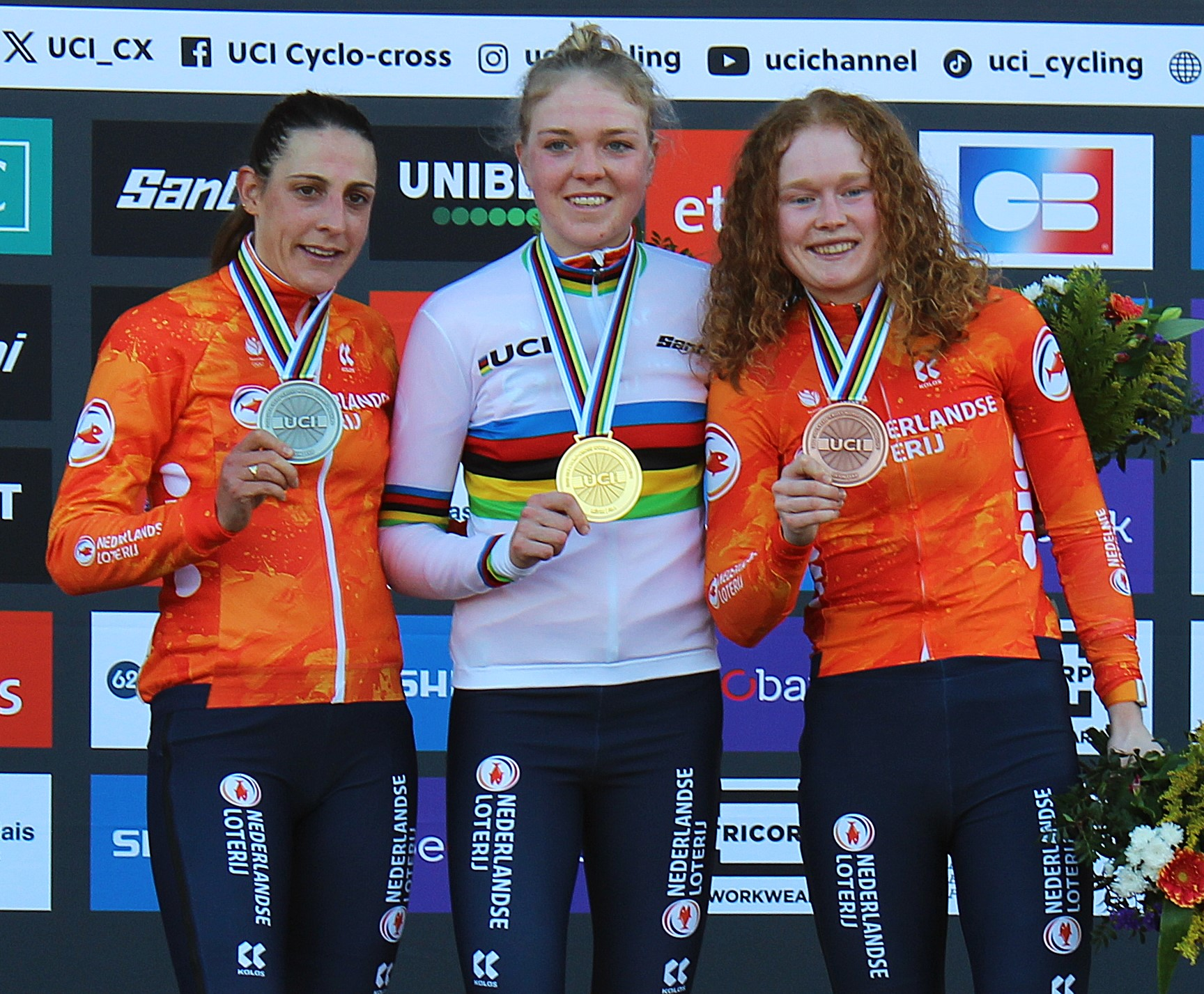
Elite Women's podium at the 2025 UCI Cyclo-cross World Championships

Result
Rank	Cyclist	Nation	Time	Diff.
	Fem van Empel	Netherlands	54:29	
2nd place, silver medalist(s)	Lucinda Brand	Netherlands	54:47	+0:18
3rd place, bronze medalist(s)	Puck Pieterse	Netherlands	55:38	+1:09
4	Inge van der Heijden	Netherlands	56:00	+1:31
5	Blanka Kata Vas	Hungary	56:25	+1:56
6	Sara Casasola	Italy	56:40	+2:11
7	Ceylin del Carmen Alvarado	Netherlands	57:05	+2:36
8	Hélène Clauzel	France	57:20	+2:51
9	Sanne Cant	Belgium	57:22	+2:53
10	Amandine Fouquenet	France	57:27	+2:58
11	Marion Norbert-Riberolle	Belgium	57:34	+3:05
12	Denise Betsema	Netherlands	57:37	+3:08
13	Katie Clouse	United States	57:46	+3:17
14	Aniek van Alphen	Netherlands	58:01	+3:32
15	Manon Bakker	Netherlands	58:21	+3:52
16	Sidney Mcgill	Canada	58:52	+4:23
17	Julie Brouwers	Belgium	59:02	+4:33
18	Elisabeth Brandau	Germany	59:23	+4:54
19	Anais Morichon	France	1:01:35	+7:06
20	Antonina Bialek	Poland	1:01:45	+7:16
21	Perrine Clauzel	France	1:02:00	+7:31
22	Amandine Vidon	France	1:02:29	+8:00
23	Eva Lechner	Italy	1:02:38	+8:09
24	Carlotta Borello	Italy	1:02:44	+8:15
25	Marlene Petitgirard	France	1:03:06	+8:37
26	Caroline Mani	France	LAP	
27	Nadja Heigl	Austria	LAP	
28	Sofia Rodriguez Revert	Spain	LAP	
29	Sara Cueto Vega	Spain	LAP	
30	Ann-Dorthe Lisbygd	Denmark	LAP	
31	Zuza Krzystała	Poland	LAP	
32	Lucia Gonzalez Blanco	Spain	LAP	
33	Christiane Bilodeau	Canada	LAP	
	Annemarie Worst	Netherlands	DNF	

==== Under-23 ====
The Under-23 Women's race took place on Sunday 2 February 2025 in 5 laps over a total distance of 14.15 km. 45 riders from 19 nations took part in the race.

Result
Rank	Cyclist	Nation	Time	Diff.
	Zoe Backstedt	Great Britain	45:42	
2nd place, silver medalist(s)	Marie Schreiber	Luxembourg	46:21	+0:39
3rd place, bronze medalist(s)	Leonie Bentveld	Netherlands	47:02	+1:20
4	Célia Gery	France	47:33	+1:51
5	Isabella Holmgren	Canada	47:59	+2:17
6	Viktória Chladoňová	Slovakia	49:20	+3:38
7	Amandine Muller	France	49:41	+3:59
8	Ella Maclean-Howell	Great Britain	50:05	+4:23
9	Imogen Wolff	Great Britain	50:23	+4:41
10	Simona Spěšná	Czech Republic	50:30	+4:48
11	Sterre Vervloet	Belgium	50:49	+5:07
12	Lucia Bramati	Italy	50:58	+5:16
13	Cat Ferguson	Great Britain	51:05	+5:23
14	Vida Lopez de San Roman	United States	51:08	+5:26
15	Electa Gallezot	France	51:11	+5:29
16	Xaydée Van Sinaey	Belgium	51:16	+5:34
17	Alexandra Valade	France	51:38	+5:56
18	Puck Langenbarg	Netherlands	51:57	+6:15
19	Beatrice Fontana	Italy	52:11	+6:29
20	Kateřina Douděrová	Czech Republic	52:28	+6:46
21	Lauren Molengraaf	Netherlands	52:37	+6:55
22	Sara Sonnemans	Netherlands	52:56	+7:14
23	Nora Fischer	Austria	53:00	+7:18
24	Jana Glaus	Switzerland	53:07	+7:25
25	Kaya Musgrave	United States	53:09	+7:27
26	Adèle Hurteloup	France	53:21	+7:39
27	Katherine Sarkisov	United States	53:28	+7:46
28	Kaija Budde	Germany	53:35	+7:53
29	Cassidy Hickey	United States	54:11	+8:29
30	Bloeme Kalis	Netherlands	54:17	+8:35
31	Regina Bruchner	Hungary	LAP	
32	Lauren Zoerner	United States	LAP	
33	Kasuga Watabe	Japan	LAP	
34	Elizabeth Gunsalus	United States	LAP	
35	Esther Wong	Ireland	LAP	
36	Lise Klaes	France	LAP	
37	Wendy Bunea	Romania	LAP	
38	Sofia Ungerová	Slovakia	LAP	
39	Marie Fay St-Onge	Canada	LAP	
40	Mia De Martin	Canada	LAP	
41	Dorothee Perron	Canada	LAP	
42	Nelia Kabetaj	Albania	LAP	
43	Marta Beti Perez	Spain	LAP	
44	Aika Hiyoshi	Japan	LAP	
45	Miruna Măda	Romania	LAP	

==== Junior ====
The Junior Women's race took place on Saturday 1 February 2025 in 5 laps over a total distance of 14.15 km. 42 riders from 15 nations took part in the race.

Result
Rank	Cyclist	Nation	Time	Diff.
	Lise Revol	France	45:25	
2nd place, silver medalist(s)	Barbora Bukovská	Czech Republic	45:36	+0:11
3rd place, bronze medalist(s)	Rafaelle Carrier	Canada	47:08	+1:43
4	Anja Grossmann	Switzerland	47:18	+1:53
5	Lidia Cusack	United States	47:18	+1:53
6	Mae Cabaca	Netherlands	47:52	+2:27
7	Alyssa Sarkisov	United States	47:52	+2:27
8	Lucie Grohová	Czech Republic	47:56	+2:31
9	Giorgia Pellizotti	Italy	48:00	+2:35
10	Lison Desprez	France	48:21	+2:56
11	Lorena Patino Villanueva	Spain	48:22	+2:57
12	Jeanne Duterne	France	48:57	+3:32
13	Nico Knoll	Canada	49:08	+3:43
14	Chiara Mettier	Switzerland	49:09	+3:44
15	Elisa Ferri	Italy	49:10	+3:45
16	Amálie Gottwaldová	Czech Republic	49:13	+3:48
17	Arabella Blackburn	Great Britain	49:48	+4:23
18	Zoe Roche	Great Britain	49:57	+4:32
19	Sanne Laurijssen	Belgium	50:28	+5:03
20	Lilou Aguirre Lavin	France	50:34	+5:09
21	Zelie Lambert	France	50:34	+5:09
22	Laly Pichon	France	50:52	+5:27
23	Ellie Mitchinson	Great Britain	51:09	+5:44
24	Maier Olano Arozena	Spain	51:15	+5:50
25	Noï Moes	Netherlands	51:22	+5:57
26	Irati Aranguren Carbayeda	Spain	51:28	+6:03
27	Sara Aaboe Kallestrup	Denmark	51:50	+6:25
28	Lyllie Sonnemann	United States	52:05	+6:40
29	Hanka Viková	Czech Republic	52:19	+6:54
30	Zita Peeters	Belgium	53:02	+7:37
31	Katrine Frederiksen	Denmark	53:21	+7:56
32	Nanami Ishikawa	Japan	53:25	+8:00
33	Bente Jochems	Netherlands	53:46	+8:21
34	Camille Basset	France	54:00	+8:35
35	Lisa Maes	Belgium	54:04	+8:39
36	Lily Rose Marois	Canada	54:16	+8:51
37	Lotte Borremans	Finland	54:23	+8:58
38	Flavia Bunea	Romania	LAP	
39	Maya Tasse	Canada	LAP	
40	Klara Dworatzek	Germany	LAP	
	Ada Watson	United States	DNF	
	Mille Foldager Nielsen	Denmark	DNF	

=== Men ===
==== Elite ====
The Elite Men's race took place on Sunday 2 February 2025 in 8 laps over a total distance of 22.55 km. 45 riders from 15 nations took part in the race.

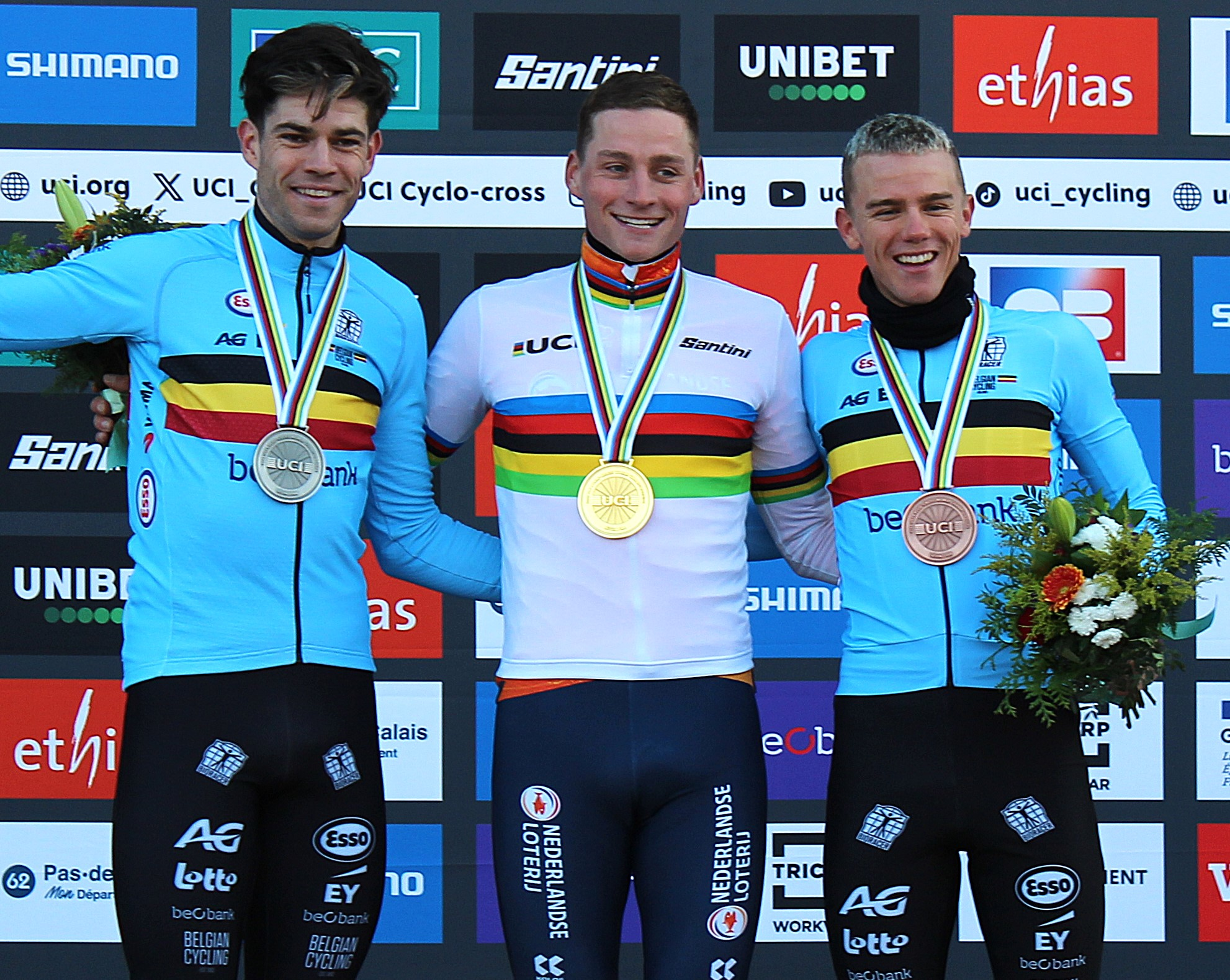
Elite Men's podium at the 2025 UCI Cyclo-cross World Championships

Result
Rank	Cyclist	Nation	Time	Diff.
	Mathieu van der Poel	Netherlands	1:02:44	
2nd place, silver medalist(s)	Wout van Aert	Belgium	1:03:29	+0:45
3rd place, bronze medalist(s)	Thibau Nys	Belgium	1:03:50	+1:06
4	Joris Nieuwenhuis	Netherlands	1:03:59	+1:15
5	Emiel Verstrynge	Belgium	1:04:37	+1:53
6	Toon Aerts	Belgium	1:04:40	+1:56
7	Michael Vanthourenhout	Belgium	1:04:44	+2:00
8	Joran Wyseure	Belgium	1:04:47	+2:03
9	Lars van der Haar	Netherlands	1:04:53	+2:09
10	Laurens Sweeck	Belgium	1:05:12	+2:28
11	Ryan Kamp	Netherlands	1:05:28	+2:44
12	Felipe Orts Lloret	Spain	1:05:29	+2:45
13	Eli Iserbyt	Belgium	1:06:16	+3:32
14	Niels Vandeputte	Belgium	1:06:24	+3:40
15	Fabien Doubey	France	1:06:31	+3:47
16	Kevin Kuhn	Switzerland	1:06:54	+4:10
17	Clément Venturini	France	1:07:06	+4:22
18	Thomas Mein	Great Britain	1:07:33	+4:49
19	Scott Funston	United States	1:07:44	+5:00
20	Mees Hendrikx	Netherlands	1:07:59	+5:15
21	Pim Ronhaar	Netherlands	1:08:15	+5:31
22	Gioele Bertolini	Italy	1:08:19	+5:35
23	David Menut	France	1:08:38	+5:54
24	Michael Boros	Czech Republic	1:08:52	+6:08
25	Joshua Dubau	France	LAP	
26	Cameron Mason	Great Britain	LAP	
27	Marcel Meisen	Germany	LAP	
28	Martin Groslambert	France	LAP	
29	Corné van Kessel	Netherlands	LAP	
30	Mario Junquera San Millan	Spain	LAP	
31	Gilles Mottiez	Switzerland	LAP	
32	Lars Sommer	Switzerland	LAP	
33	Timothé Gabriel	France	LAP	
34	Luca Harter	Germany	LAP	
35	Kevin Suarez Fernandez	Spain	LAP	
36	Loris Rouiller	Switzerland	LAP	
37	Marek Konwa	Poland	LAP	
38	Tyler Clark	Canada	LAP	
39	Karl-Erik Rosendahl	Denmark	LAP	
40	Hijiri Oda	Japan	LAP	
41	Cody Scott	Canada	LAP	
42	Eric Brunner	United States	LAP	
43	Jozsef-Attila Malnasi	Romania	LAP	
	Jonas Köpsel	Germany	DNF	
	Luke Wiedmann	Switzerland	DNF	

==== Under-23 ====
The Under-23 Men's race took place on Saturday 1 February 2025 in 7 laps over a total distance of 19.75 km. 49 riders from 17 nations took part in the race.

Result
Rank	Cyclist	Nation	Time	Diff.
	Tibor Del Grosso	Netherlands	56:26	
2nd place, silver medalist(s)	Kay De Bruyckere	Belgium	57:22	+0:56
3rd place, bronze medalist(s)	Jente Michels	Belgium	57:31	+1:05
4	Stefano Viezzi	Italy	57:58	+1:32
5	Seppe Van Den Boer	Belgium	58:36	+2:10
6	Aubin Sparfel	France	58:55	+2:29
7	Jules Simon	France	59:00	+2:34
8	Léo Bisiaux	France	59:01	+2:35
9	Viktor Vandenberghe	Belgium	59:01	+2:35
10	Nathan Bommenel	France	59:12	+2:46
11	Senna Remijn	Netherlands	59:18	+2:52
12	David Haverdings	Netherlands	59:26	+3:00
13	Zsombor Takács	Hungary	59:30	+3:04
14	Keije Solen	Netherlands	59:34	+3:08
15	Guus van den Eijnden	Netherlands	59:39	+3:13
16	Ian Ackert	Canada	1:00:01	+3:35
17	Corentin Lequet	France	1:00:14	+3:48
18	Sil De Brauwere	Belgium	1:00:20	+3:54
19	Aaron Dockx	Belgium	1:00:36	+4:10
20	Romain Debord	France	1:00:56	+4:30
21	Danny van Lierop	Netherlands	1:01:03	+4:37
22	Matéo Jot	France	1:01:14	+4:48
23	Maximilian Kerl	Czech Republic	1:01:15	+4:49
24	Dylan Zakrajsek	United States	1:01:50	+5:24
25	František Hojka	Czech Republic	1:01:53	+5:27
26	Silas Kuschla	Germany	1:02:08	+5:42
27	Maxime St-onge	Canada	1:02:15	+5:49
28	Miguel Rodriguez Novoa	Spain	1:02:46	+6:20
29	Yordi Corsus	Belgium	1:03:09	+6:43
30	Hannes Degenkolb	Germany	1:03:22	+6:56
31	Max Heiner Oertzen	Germany	LAP	
32	Eike Behrens	Germany	LAP	
33	Shingen Yunoki	Japan	LAP	
34	Raul Mira Bonastre	Spain	LAP	
35	Ksawier Garnek	Poland	LAP	
36	Jonas Posselt Gamborg	Denmark	LAP	
37	Samuele Scappini	Italy	LAP	
38	Pavel Jindřich	Czech Republic	LAP	
39	Mads Schulz Jørgensen	Denmark	LAP	
40	Tatsuumi Soejima	Japan	LAP	
41	Matteo Oppizzi	Switzerland	LAP	
42	Nicolas Halter	Switzerland	LAP	
43	Alexander Woodford	Canada	LAP	
44	Dragos Stavar	Romania	LAP	
45	Jacob Turner	New Zealand	LAP	
	Matyás Fiala	Czech Republic	DNF	
	Henry Coote	United States	DNF	
	Václav Ježek	Czech Republic	DNF	
	Paul Greijus	Sweden	DNF	

==== Junior ====
The Junior Men's race took place on Sunday 2 February 2025 in 6 laps over a total distance of 16.95 km. 68 riders from 22 nations took part in the race.

Result
Rank	Cyclist	Nation	Time	Diff.
	Mattia Agostinacchio	Italy	45:47	
2nd place, silver medalist(s)	Soren Bruyère Joumard	France	45:59	+0:12
3rd place, bronze medalist(s)	Filippo Grigolini	Italy	46:17	+0:30
4	Benjamin Noval Suarez	Spain	46:18	+0:31
5	Mats Vanden Eynde	Belgium	46:26	+0:39
6	Oscar Amey	Great Britain	46:39	+0:52
7	Soen Le Pann	France	46:55	+1:08
8	Michiel Mouris	Netherlands	46:55	+1:08
9	Florian Fery	France	46:57	+1:10
10	Milo Wills	Great Britain	47:03	+1:16
11	Emilien Belzile	Canada	47:08	+1:21
12	Noël Goijert	Netherlands	47:30	+1:43
13	Giel Lejeune	Belgium	47:36	+1:49
14	Patrik Pezzo Rosola	Italy	47:42	+1:55
15	Soan Ruesche	France	47:49	+2:02
16	Kryštof Bažant	Czech Republic	47:57	+2:10
17	Cas Timmermans	Netherlands	48:00	+2:13
18	Raúl López Sainz	Spain	48:01	+2:14
19	Conor Murphy	Ireland	48:04	+2:17
20	Lennes Jacobs	Belgium	48:13	+2:26
21	Ettore Fabbro	Italy	48:20	+2:33
22	Benjamin Bravman	United States	48:38	+2:51
23	Ryan Laenen	Belgium	48:43	+2:56
24	Theophile Vassal	France	48:49	+3:02
25	Aidan Vollmuth	United States	48:50	+3:03
26	Rick Versloot	Netherlands	48:53	+3:06
27	Baptiste Carrere	France	48:56	+3:09
28	Peter Šoltés	Slovakia	48:59	+3:12
29	Martin Fernandez Garcia	Spain	49:01	+3:14
30	Michal Sichta	Slovakia	49:07	+3:20
31	Benedikt Benz	Germany	49:15	+3:28
32	Dylan Haynes	United States	49:16	+3:29
33	David Svoboda	Czech Republic	49:27	+3:40
34	Ethan Brown	United States	49:54	+4:07
35	Antonín John	Czech Republic	50:02	+4:15
36	Gaël Guillaume	France	50:03	+4:16
37	Luan Elsässer	Germany	50:07	+4:20
38	Garrett Beshore	United States	50:28	+4:41
39	Farland Lamont	Canada	50:41	+4:54
40	Tristan Taillefer	Canada	50:48	+5:01
41	Kacper Mizuro	Poland	50:57	+5:10
42	Sagan Goertz	Canada	51:01	+5:14
43	Benedek Berencsi	Hungary	51:11	+5:24
44	Lukáš Kristl	Czech Republic	51:15	+5:28
45	Ryan Daly	Ireland	51:22	+5:35
46	Niclas Look	Germany	51:28	+5:41
47	Marius Engelbrecht Linde	Denmark	51:32	+5:45
48	Maksymilian Matyasik	Poland	51:42	+5:55
49	Anton Kochanowski	Germany	51:42	+5:55
50	Curtis Mckee	Ireland	51:59	+6:12
51	Michael Hettegger	Austria	52:08	+6:21
52	Tobias Hajkovský	Slovakia	LAP	
53	Levin Näf	Switzerland	LAP	
54	Montgomery Rigby	Canada	LAP	
55	Tobias Schreiber	Germany	LAP	
56	Oskar Koudal	Denmark	LAP	
57	Jonah Flammang-Lies	Luxembourg	LAP	
58	Shuntaro Yamada	Japan	LAP	
59	Campbell Mcconnell	Australia	LAP	
60	Luca Bodareu	Romania	LAP	
61	Mathias Houmann Petersen	Denmark	LAP	
	Oscar Dige	Denmark	DNF	
	Lennox Papi	Luxembourg	DNF	
	Vilmer Ekman	Sweden	DNF	
	Jakub Benča	Slovakia	DNF	
	Vilmar Aastrup	Sweden	DNF	
	Valentin Hofer	Austria	DNF	

=== Mixed Event ===
==== Team Relay ====
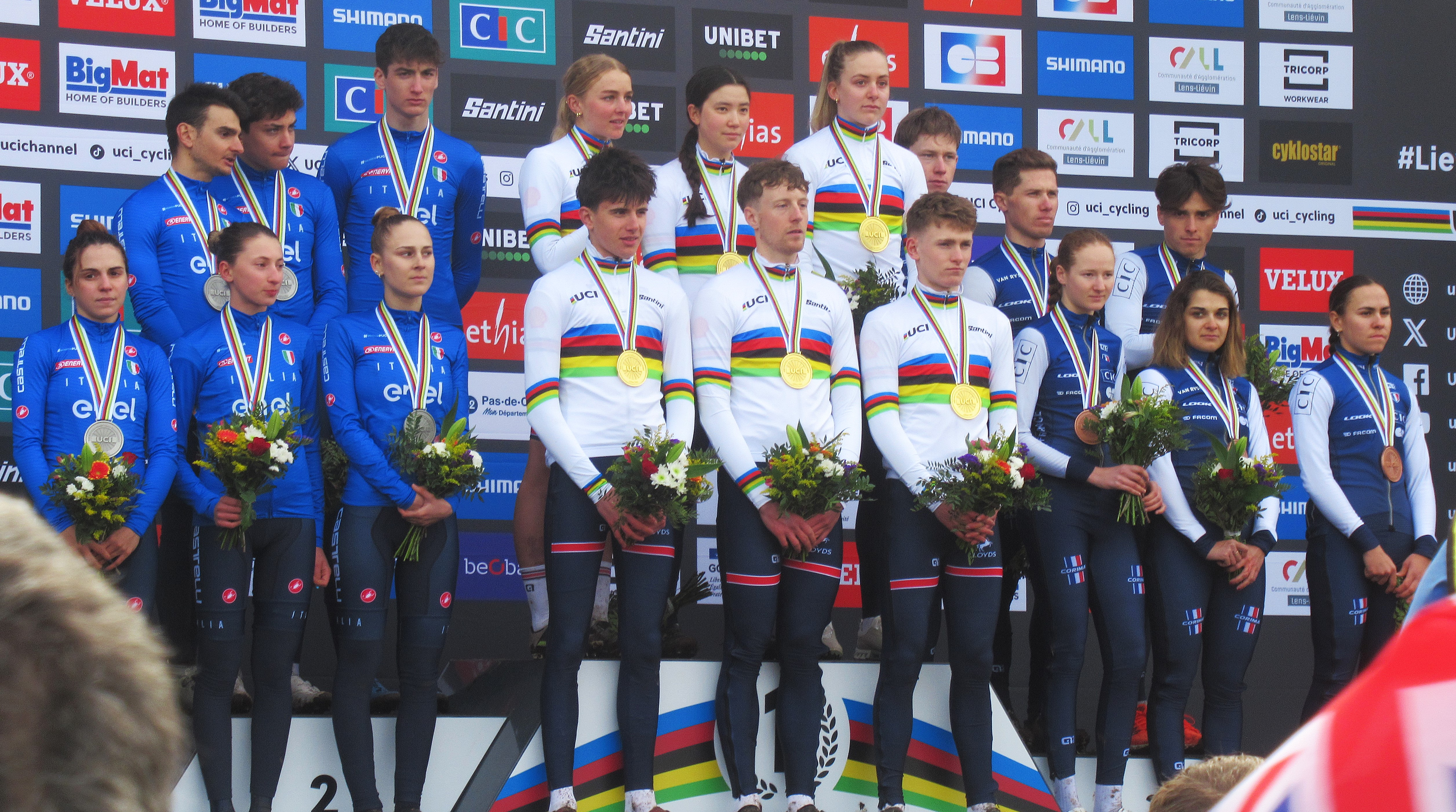
Mixed team relay's podium at the 2025 UCI Cyclo-cross World Championships

The Mixed Team Relay race took place on Friday 31 January 2025 over a total distance of 16.95 km and 10 nations took part. This was the 4th edition of the Mixed Team relay event at the world championships. Each relay team consisted of 6 riders which could be made up of:

- 1 Elite Men or 1 Under-23 Men rider,
- 1 Under-23 Men or 1 Junior Men rider,
- 1 Junior Men rider,
- 1 Elite Women or 1 Under-23 Women rider,
- 1 Under-23 Women or 1 Junior Women rider,
- 1 Junior Women rider,

Each rider rode one lap. The countries were free to choose the starting order of their riders.

Result
Rank	Nation	Riders	Start order	Category	Lap			Time	Diff.
Rank	Nation	Riders	Start order	Category	Rank	Split	Total	Time	Diff.
	Great Britain	Zoe Backstedt	2A	WU	9	08:29	08:36	50:03	
	Great Britain	Darlison Milo Wills	2B	MJ	5	07:57	16:33	50:03	
	Great Britain	Maia Zoe Roche	2C	WJ	7	09:47	26:20	50:03	
	Great Britain	Oscar Amey	2D	MJ	2	07:28	33:48	50:03	
	Great Britain	Cat Ferguson	2E	WU	3	08:55	42:43	50:03	
	Great Britain	Thomas Mein	2F	ME	1	07:20	50:03	50:03	
2nd place, silver medalist(s)	Italy	Mattia Agostinacchio	5A	MJ	1	07:37	07:44	50:05	00:02
2nd place, silver medalist(s)	Italy	Gioele Bertolini	5B	ME	1	07:34	15:18	50:05	00:02
2nd place, silver medalist(s)	Italy	Giorgia Pellizotti	5C	WJ	2	09:10	24:28	50:05	00:02
2nd place, silver medalist(s)	Italy	Lucia Bramati	5D	WU	3	09:28	33:56	50:05	00:02
2nd place, silver medalist(s)	Italy	Sara Casasola	5E	WE	2	08:45	42:41	50:05	00:02
2nd place, silver medalist(s)	Italy	Stefano Viezzi	5F	MU	2	07:24	50:05	50:05	00:02
3rd place, bronze medalist(s)	France	Jules Simon	1A	MU	4	07:41	07:47	50:08	00:05
3rd place, bronze medalist(s)	France	Florian Fery	1B	MJ	2	07:33	15:20	50:08	00:05
3rd place, bronze medalist(s)	France	Célia Gery	1C	WU	1	08:58	24:18	50:08	00:05
3rd place, bronze medalist(s)	France	Zélie Lambert	1D	WJ	4	09:45	34:03	50:08	00:05
3rd place, bronze medalist(s)	France	Hélène Clauzel	1E	WE	4	08:48	42:51	50:08	00:05
3rd place, bronze medalist(s)	France	Joshua Dubau	1F	ME	3	07:17	50:08	50:08	00:05
4	United States	Scott Funston	7A	ME	2	07:39	07:45	50:11	00:08
4	United States	Aidan Vollmuth	7B	MJ	3	07:55	15:40	50:11	00:08
4	United States	Katie Clouse	7C	WE	3	08:48	24:28	50:11	00:08
4	United States	Vida Lopez de San Roman	7D	WU	1	08:57	33:25	50:11	00:08
4	United States	Lidia Cusack	7E	WJ	1	09:07	42:32	50:11	00:08
4	United States	Henry Coote	7F	MU	4	07:39	50:11	50:11	00:08
5	Czech Republic	Matyáš Fiala	6A	MU	3	07:41	07:47	51:19	01:16
5	Czech Republic	Barbora Bukovská	6B	WJ	6	09:02	16:49	51:19	01:16
5	Czech Republic	Lucie Grohová	6C	WJ	6	09:30	26:19	51:19	01:16
5	Czech Republic	Kryštof Bažant	6D	MJ	5	07:51	34:10	51:19	01:16
5	Czech Republic	Katerina Douderová	6E	WU	5	09:23	43:33	51:19	01:16
5	Czech Republic	Maximilian Kerl	6F	MU	5	07:46	51:19	51:19	01:16
6	Belgium	Mats Vanden Eynde	3A	MJ	7	08:05	08:12	51:24	01:21
6	Belgium	Xaydee Van Sinaey	3B	WU	8	09:26	17:38	51:24	01:21
6	Belgium	Kay De Bruyckere	3C	MU	4	07:27	25:05	51:24	01:21
6	Belgium	Sanne Laurijssen	3D	WJ	7	09:51	34:56	51:24	01:21
6	Belgium	Sanne Cant	3E	WE	7	09:12	44:08	51:24	01:21
6	Belgium	Toon Aerts	3F	ME	6	07:16	51:24	51:24	01:21
7	Canada	Maxime St Onge	4A	MU	6	07:58	08:05	51:27	01:24
7	Canada	Emilien Belzile	4B	MJ	4	08:22	16:27	51:27	01:24
7	Canada	Rafaelle Carrier	4C	WJ	5	09:15	25:42	51:27	01:24
7	Canada	Sidney Mcgill	4D	WE	6	09:02	34:44	51:27	01:24
7	Canada	Isabella Holmgren	4E	WU	6	08:58	43:42	51:27	01:24
7	Canada	Ian Ackert	4F	MU	7	07:45	51:27	51:27	01:24
8	Spain	Miguel Rodriguez Novoa	8A	MU	5	07:42	07:49	52:32	02:29
8	Spain	Lorena Patiño Villanueva	8B	WJ	7	09:38	17:27	52:32	02:29
8	Spain	Irati Aranguren Carbayeda	8C	WJ	8	10:23	27:50	52:32	02:29
8	Spain	Benjamin Noval Suarez	8D	MJ	8	07:42	35:32	52:32	02:29
8	Spain	Sofia Rodriguez Revert	8E	WE	8	09:26	44:58	52:32	02:29
8	Spain	Felipe Orts Lloret	8F	ME	8	07:34	52:32	52:32	02:29
9	Japan	Shingen Yunoki	9A	MU	8	08:15	08:22	58:11	08:08
9	Japan	Kasuga Watabe	9B	WU	9	10:08	18:30	58:11	08:08
9	Japan	Aika Hiyoshi	9C	WU	9	11:03	29:33	58:11	08:08
9	Japan	Shuntaro Yamada	9D	MJ	9	09:09	38:42	58:11	08:08
9	Japan	Nanami Ishikawa	9E	WJ	9	11:16	49:58	58:11	08:08
9	Japan	Hijiri Oda	9F	ME	9	08:13	58:11	58:11	08:08
10	Romania	Jozsef-Attila Malnasi	10A	ME	10	09:04	09:12	1:02:20	12:17
10	Romania	Luca Bodareu	10B	MJ	10	09:52	19:04	1:02:20	12:17
10	Romania	Miruna Mada	10C	WU	10	12:42	31:46	1:02:20	12:17
10	Romania	Flavia Bunea	10D	WJ	10	11:24	43:10	1:02:20	12:17
10	Romania	Wendy Bunea	10E	WU	10	09:55	53:05	1:02:20	12:17
10	Romania	Dragos Stavar	10F	MU	10	09:15	1:02:20	1:02:20	12:17

^{ME} Elite Men
^{MJ} Junior Men
^{MU} Under-23 Men
^{WE} Elite Women
^{WJ} Junior Women
^{WU} Under-23 Women

=== Medals table ===
* Host nation (France)

Rank	Nation	Gold	Silver	Bronze	Total
1	Netherlands (NED)	3	1	2	6
2	Great Britain (GBR)	2	0	0	2
3	France (FRA)*	1	1	1	3
3	Italy (ITA)	1	1	1	3
5	Belgium (BEL)	0	2	2	4
6	Czech Republic (CZE)	0	1	0	1
6	Luxembourg (LUX)	0	1	0	1
8	Canada (CAN)	0	0	1	1
Totals (8 entries)		7	7	7	21

== See also ==
- 2024–25 UCI Cyclo-cross World Cup
- 2024 UEC European Cyclo-cross Championships
