= Thomas Mein =

British cyclist

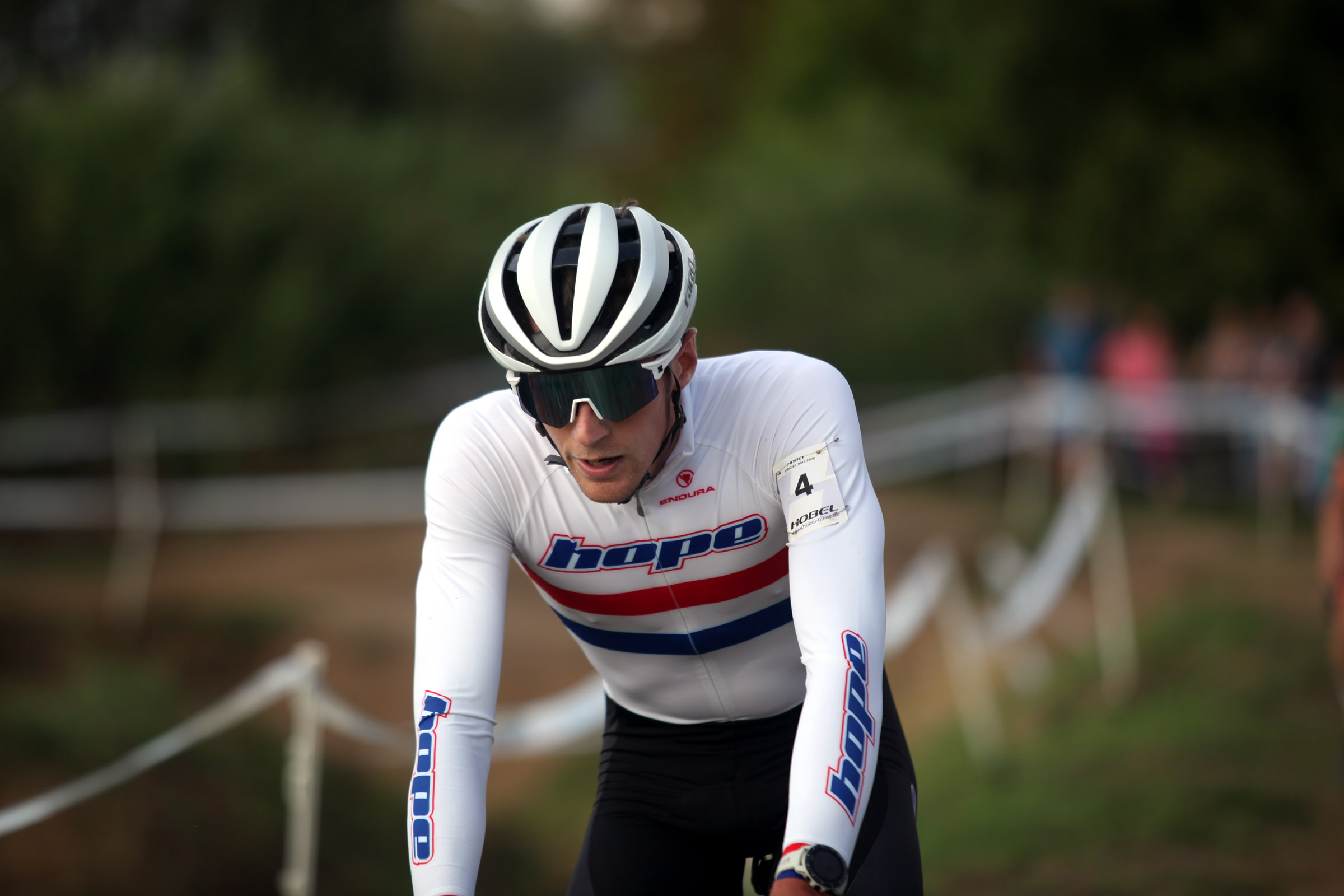
- Mein in 2022 in Bensheim, Germany

Personal information
- Full name: Thomas Mein
- Nicknames: The Dunston Rocket; The Mein Machine
- Born: 12 January 1999 (age 27) Gateshead, United Kingdom
- Height: 185 cm (6 ft 1 in)
- Weight: 71 kg (157 lb; 11 st 3 lb)

Cycling career
- Sport: Cycling
- Current team: Hope Factory Racing (cyclo-cross) (mountain biking)
- Disciplines: Cyclo-cross; Mountain Biking
- Role: Rider
- Rider type: Rouleur

Amateur teams
- 2008–2009: Hetton Hawks CC
- 2010–2014: MTS Cycle Sport
- 2014–2018: Derwentside CC
- 2018: Hope Factory Racing

Professional teams
- 2018–2019: Tarteletto–Isorex (cyclo-cross)
- 2020–2022: Tormans CX Team (cyclo-cross)
- 2020–2022: Canyon dhb p/b Soreen (road)
- 2022–: Hope Factory Racing (cyclo-cross)

Major wins
- Cyclo-cross National Championships (2022)
Medal record
Men's cyclo-cross
Representing Great Britain
World Championships
Gold medal – first place	2025 Lievin	Team relay
Silver medal – second place	2023 Hoogerheide	Team relay
European Championships
Silver medal – second place	2020 ’s-Hertogenbosch	Under-23

Thomas Mein (born 12 January 1999) is a British cyclist who currently rides for Hope Factory Racing in cyclo-cross and mountain biking. His most notable achievements are winning the under-23 men's race at the UCI Cyclo-cross World Cup in Tábor, Czech Republic in November 2019, and winning the British National Cyclo-Cross Championships in 2022.

== Career ==
=== Junior career ===
Mein started out his career with the amateur cycling teams Hetton Hawks CC and Derwentside CC. One of Mein's major races was the Koppenbergcross of November 2016, when Mein was only seventeen-years old; Mein was up against a pack of experienced Belgian and Dutch riders, and compatriot Tom Pidcock. Due to these factors, Mein was considered the underdog, and not expected to have a podium finish. However, Mein rode a smart race, and finished in first position.

=== Tarteletto–Isorex ===
In 2018, Mein joined the Belgian cyclo-cross team Tarteletto–Isorex. Mein's career turned professional and as he began to rise to the podium more and more, Mein had his eyes set on the 2019 UCI Cyclo-cross World Cup which he had missed out on first-place during November 2018.

In November 2019, Mein claimed his first win at a UCI Cyclo-cross World Cup race in Tábor, Czech Republic. Mein timed his attack perfectly with an eleven-second lead over Swiss rider Kevin Kuhn. To add on to Mein's accomplishments, throughout this season and previous seasons Mein has generally finished within the top-twenty echelon of racers.

Mein has also claimed several other podium finishes throughout previous seasons, including the National Trophy Series in Derby, the British National Cyclo-cross Championships at Cyclopark in Gravesend, and the DVV Trofee in Niel, Belgium.

=== Tormans CX Team and Canyon DHB ===
On 28 January 2020, Mein announced on social media that he would be joining Tormans XC Team in cyclo-cross. On 5 March 2020, Mein joined British UCI Continental team Canyon dhb p/b Soreen for the 2020 road season. Due to winning the UEC European Under-23 Championships in 2020, Mein therefore won the first international medal for Tormans CX Team. On 5 September 2021, Mein embarked on his first Tour of Britain with Canyon dhb SunGod. His best result was eleventh position at the finish of Stage 7.

=== Hope Factory Racing ===
As of 14 April 2022, Mein will be riding for the British cyclo-cross team Hope Factory Racing.

== Major results ==
=== Cyclo-cross ===
2016–2017
Junior DVV Trophy

1st Koppenberg

Junior National Trophy Series

2nd Derby
3rd Houghton-le-Spring

2018–2019
National Trophy Series

2nd Derby

Under-23 DVV Trophy

3rd Niel

3rd National Championships
5th UEC European Under-23 Championships
2019–2020
National Trophy Series

1st Derby

UCI Under-23 World Cup

1st Tábor
3rd Nommay

Under-23 DVV Trophy

3rd Loenhout

2020–2021
UCI Under-23 World Cup

1st Tábor

2nd UEC European Under-23 Championships
2021–2022
1st National Championships
National Trophy Series

1st Broughton Hall

2022–2023
2nd Team relay, UCI World Championships
2nd Clanfield
3rd Overall National Trophy Series

1st South Shields
1st Gravesend
2nd Derby
3rd Broughton Hall

3rd National Championships
2023–2024
1st Overall National Trophy Series

1st South Shields
1st Derby
1st Torbay
2nd Thornton in Craven
3rd Gravesend

1st Overall Hope Supercross

1st Houghton-le-Spring
1st Bradford
1st Barnoldswick

2nd National Championships
2024–2025
1st Team relay, UCI World Championships
1st Overall National Trophy Series
National Trophy Series

1st Derby
1st South Shields
1st Paignton

Hope Supercross

1st Tong I
1st Tong II
1st Wyke I

1st Ouistreham
2025–2026
National Trophy Series

1st Derby
1st Falkirk
1st Clanfield
1st West Bromwich

Hope Supercross

1st Wyke III
1st Wyke IIII

=== Gravel ===
2024
UCI World Series

1st Peize

2025
UCI World Series

3rd Roden

=== Mountain bike ===
2022
2nd Cross-country, National Championships
2nd Marathon, National Championships
2024
National XCO Series

1st Kirroughtree
1st Margam Park
3rd Cannock Chase

National Championships

2nd Cross-country
3rd Short track

2025
3rd Cross-country, National Championships

=== Road ===
2019
National Circuit Series

2nd Newcastle

2021
3rd Ilkley GP
2022
Tour Series

1st Guisborough

2024
1st Mosselkoers Houtem – Vilvoorde
1st GP Industria del Cuoio
1st Giro Nazionale del Valdarno
2025
1st Stage 3 Flèche du Sud
