= 2014–15 UCI Cyclo-cross World Cup =

Bicycle racing competition

2014–2015 UCI Cyclo-cross World Cup
Details
- Dates: 19 October 2014 – 25 January 2015
- Location: Europe
- Races: 6

Champions
- Male individual champion: Kevin Pauwels (BEL)
- Female individual champion: Sanne Cant (BEL)

The 2014–2015 UCI Cyclo-cross World Cup events and season-long competition took place between 10 October 2014 and 26 January 2014, organised by the Union Cycliste Internationale (UCI).

The men's competition took place without the Belgian Niels Albert, twice the winner, who announced his retirement from the sport in May, 2014 because of a heart condition.

Katie Compton of the United States had dominated the women's competition last year and was attempting to defend her title.

The third round held in Milton Keynes, England was notable for being the first time that a World Cup event had been held outside of mainland Europe.

== Events ==
In comparison to last season's seven races, this season only had six. Rome, Nommay and Tábor were taken out of the programme – the latter ultimately hosting the World Championships – while Milton Keynes was added and Hoogerheide is back after hosting the 2014 World Championships .

Date	Venue	Country	Elite men's winner	Elite women's winner
19 October	Valkenburg	Netherlands	Lars van der Haar (NED)	Katie Compton (USA)
22 November	Koksijde	Belgium	Wout Van Aert (BEL)	Sanne Cant (BEL)
29 November	Milton Keynes	Great Britain	Kevin Pauwels (BEL)	Sanne Cant (BEL)
21 December	Namur	Belgium	Kevin Pauwels (BEL)	Kateřina Nash (CZE)
26 December	Heusden-Zolder	Belgium	Lars van der Haar (NED)	Marianne Vos (NED)
25 January	Hoogerheide	Netherlands	Mathieu van der Poel (NED)	Eva Lechner (ITA)

== Individual standings ==
=== Men ===
Rank	Name	Points
1	Kevin Pauwels (BEL)	430
2	Lars van der Haar (NED)	345
3	Corné van Kessel (NED)	307
4	Philipp Walsleben (GER)	306
5	Tom Meeusen (BEL)	290
6	Jens Adams (BEL)	256
7	Gianni Vermeersch (BEL)	255
8	Francis Mourey (FRA)	212
9	Jeremy Powers (USA)	210
10	Julien Taramarcaz (SUI)	180

=== Women ===
Rank	Name	Points
1	Sanne Cant (BEL)	206
2	Katie Compton (USA)	177
3	Ellen Van Loy (BEL)	176
4	Sophie de Boer (NED)	149
5	Lucie Chainel-Lefevre (FRA)	146
6	Helen Wyman (GBR)	142
7	Sabrina Stultiens (NED)	132
8	Nikki Harris (GBR)	130
9	Marianne Vos (NED)	110
10	Kateřina Nash (CZE)	110
