= 2014 UCI Cyclo-cross World Championships – Women's elite race =

Women's Elite Cyclo-cross Race
2014 UCI Cyclo-cross World Championships
- Rainbow jersey

Race details
- Dates: 1 February 2014
- Stages: 1
- Distance: 13.6 km (8.5 mi)
- Winning time: 39' 26"

Medalists
	Gold	Marianne Vos (Netherlands)
	Silver	Eva Lechner (Italy)
	Bronze	Helen Wyman (United Kingdom)

This event was held on 1 February 2014 as a part of the 2014 UCI Cyclo-cross World Championships in Hoogerheide, Netherlands. Participants must be women born in 1997 or before. It was won by Marianne Vos of Netherlands, grabbing her seventh title, the sixth in a row.

== Race report ==
Katie Compton of the United States, one of the two main favourites, had a terrible first few minutes, getting her bike stuck in someone else's. This immediately pushed her down to the back of the pack. That other favourite, Marianne Vos of Netherlands, didn't wait around and finished lap one five seconds ahead of Eva Lechner of Italy and 19 seconds ahead of Helen Wyman of United Kingdom. By the end of lap two the gap had widened to 23 seconds on Lechner, 48 on Sanne Cant of Belgium and 51 on Wyman and Compton who managed to get past the rest of the pack.

Compton continued her comeback, made the jump to Cant and immediately worked on biking towards Lechner. Moments later it seemed like she may have overestimated her powers, dropping back to a fifth spot behind Cant and Wyman again. By the end of the third lap, with only one lap left, Vos had 52s on Lechner and 1m09s on Wyman and Cant. Compton followed at 1m27s, losing her chance at the podium.

Vos never was threatened and took home her seventh World Championship title. Lechner stayed ahead of Wyman and Cant and grabbed silver. Wyman managed to get a small gap on Cant halfway through that last lap, securing the bronze medal. Compton ended up on a ninth spot at almost three minutes.

== Ranking ==
Rank	Cyclist	Time
Gold medal	Marianne Vos (NED)	39' 26"
Silver medal	Eva Lechner (ITA)	+ 1' 07"
Bronze medal	Helen Wyman (GBR)	+ 1' 17"
4	Sanne Cant (BEL)	+ 1' 20"
5	Nikki Harris (GBR)	+ 2' 33"
6	Lucie Chainel-Lefèvre (FRA)	+ 2' 43"
7	Loes Sels (BEL)	+ 2' 47"
8	Thalita de Jong (NED)	+ 2' 52"
9	Katie Compton (USA)	+ 2' 58"
10	Caroline Mani (FRA)	+ 2' 58"
