= Corné van Kessel =

Dutch cyclist

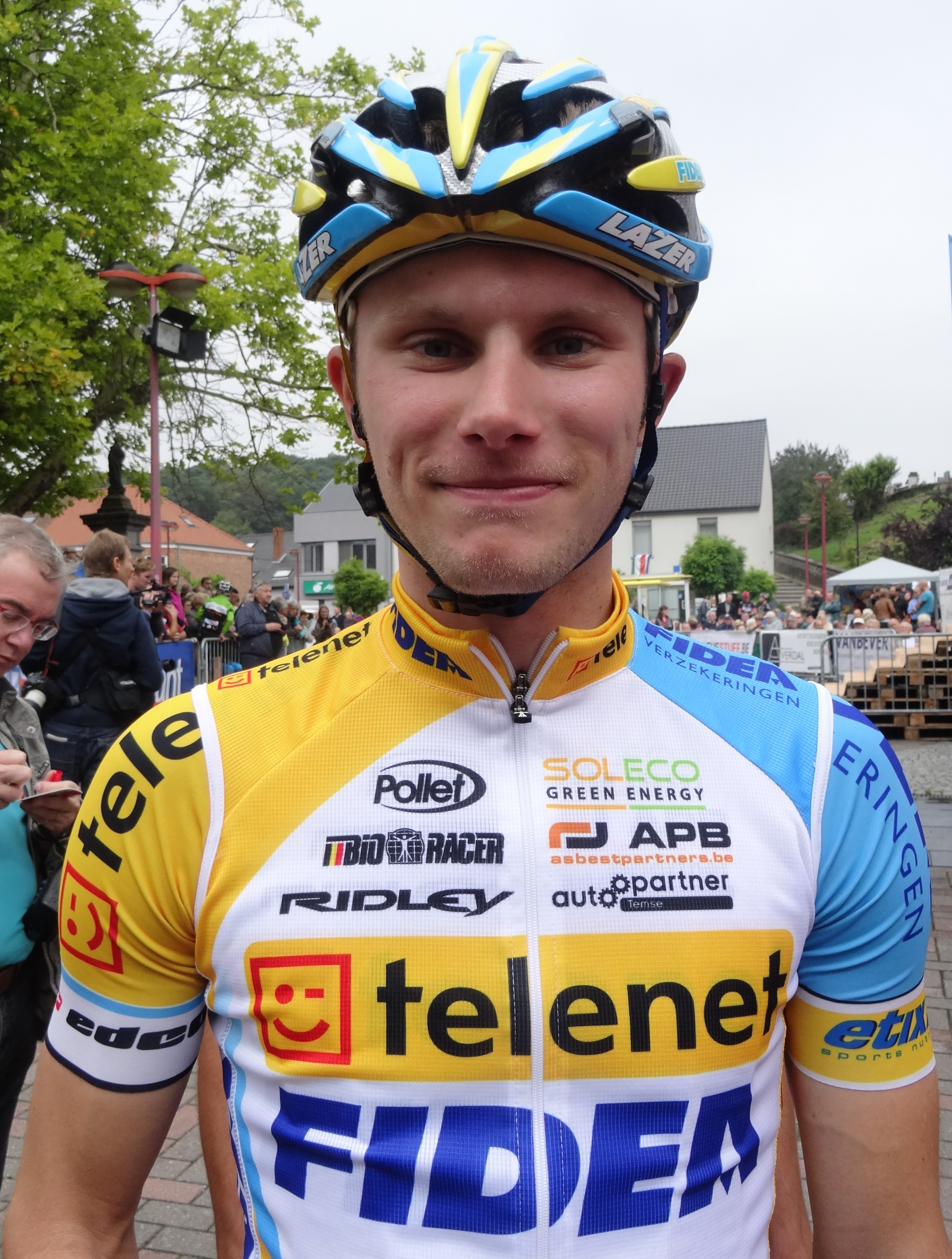
- Van Kessel in 2014

Personal information
- Full name: Corné van Kessel
- Born: 7 August 1991 (age 35) Veldhoven, Netherlands
- Height: 177 cm (5 ft 10 in)
- Weight: 65 kg (143 lb)

Cycling career
- Sport: Cycling
- Current team: Team Deschacht–Group Hens–Containers Maes
- Disciplines: Cyclo-cross; Road
- Role: Rider

Professional teams
- 2009–2019: Telenet–Fidea
- 2020–2022: Tormans CX Team (cyclo-cross)
- 2020: Circus–Wanty Gobert (road)
- 2021–2022: Intermarché–Wanty–Gobert Matériaux (road)
- 2023–: Team Deschacht–Group Hens–Containers Maes (cyclo-cross)

Corné van Kessel (born 7 August 1991) is a Dutch professional cyclo-cross and road cyclist, who currently rides for UCI Cyclo-cross team Team Deschacht–Group Hens–Containers Maes.

== Career ==
Van Kessel was born in Veldhoven. After spending his first years with the Belgian Lotto Olympia Tienen team, he switched to Telenet–Fidea from September 2009 on, first in the development team and since 2013 as an elite rider. In October 2013, he extended his contract with the Telenet–Fidea team until the end of 2016.

== Major results ==
=== Cyclo-cross ===
2008–2009
2nd UCI World Junior Championships
2009–2010
1st National Under-23 Championships
2011–2012
Under-23 Gazet van Antwerpen

3rd Baal

2012–2013
Under-23 Bpost Bank Trofee

1st Essen
1st Loenhout
3rd Baal
3rd Oostmalle

2nd UEC European Under-23 Championships
2nd National Under-23 Championships
UCI Under-23 World Cup

2nd Tábor
2nd Heusden-Zolder

Under-23 Superprestige

3rd Gavere

2013–2014
2nd National Championships
2014–2015
2nd Surhuisterveen
2nd Brabant
UCI World Cup

3rd Cauberg
3rd Heusden-Zolder
5th Namur

3rd Woerden
2015–2016
1st Surhuisterveen
2016–2017
1st Surhuisterveen
1st Pfaffnau
2nd National Championships
2nd Brabant
UCI World Cup

3rd Hoogerheide

Soudal Classics

3rd Hasselt

Brico Cross

3rd Kruibeke

EKZ CrossTour

3rd Hittnau

3rd Mol
5th UCI World Championships
2017–2018
Soudal Classics

1st Hasselt
1st Leuven
3rd Niel

UCI World Cup

2nd Waterloo
4th Zeven

2nd Overijse
2nd Mol
2nd Contern
DVV Trophy

3rd Baal

EKZ CrossTour

3rd Bern

3rd Brabant
3rd Woerden
2018–2019
1st Mol
1st Contern
2nd Woerden
3rd National Championships
Superprestige

3rd Hoogstraten

EKZ CrossTour

3rd Aigle

3rd Overijse
3rd Waterloo
UCI World Cup

4th Hoogerheide
5th Koksijde
5th Iowa City

2019–2020
UCI World Cup

3rd Namur
5th Waterloo

Superprestige

3rd Gieten

DVV Trophy

3rd Loenhout
3rd Brussels

3rd Gullegem
2020–2021
X²O Badkamers Trophy

3rd Lille

2021–2022
2nd National Championships
X²O Badkamers Trophy

3rd Kortrijk

UCI World Cup

5th Besançon

2023–2024
2nd Faè Di Oderzo
3rd Mechelen
2024–2025
2nd Brumath

=== Road ===
2017
3rd Internationale Wielertrofee Jong Maar Moedig
4th Heistse Pijl
2022
5th Schaal Sels
