= Joris Nieuwenhuis =

Dutch cyclist (born 1996)

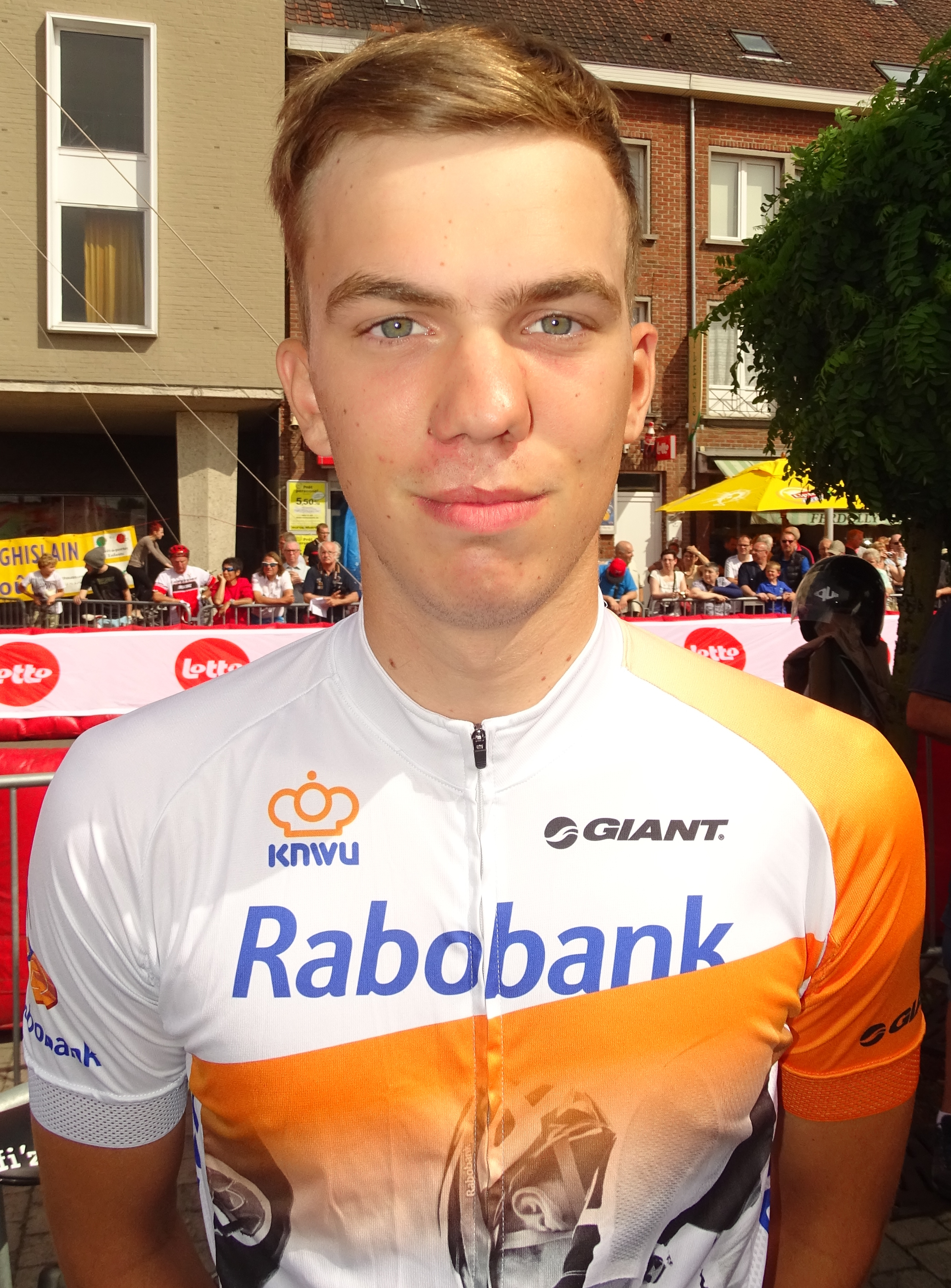
- Nieuwenhuis in 2015.

Personal information
- Full name: Joris Nieuwenhuis
- Born: 11 February 1996 (age 30) Doetinchem, Netherlands
- Height: 1.85 m (6 ft 1 in)
- Weight: 71 kg (157 lb)

Cycling career
- Sport: Cycling
- Current team: Baloise Verzekeringen–Het Poetsbureau Lions
- Disciplines: Cyclo-cross; Road
- Role: Rider

Professional teams
- 2014–2016: Rabobank Development Team
- 2017–2018: Development Team Sunweb
- 2019–2022: Team Sunweb
- 2022–2024: Baloise–Trek Lions
- 2025–: Ridley Racing Team

Major wins
- Cyclo-cross National Championships (2024) World Cup 1 individual win (2023–24) Trophy (2025–26)
Medal record
Representing Netherlands
Men's cyclo-cross
World Championships
Gold medal – first place	2017 Bieles	Men's under-23 race
Silver medal – second place	2024 Tábor	Elite

Joris Nieuwenhuis (born 11 February 1996) is a Dutch cyclist, who currently rides for Ridley Racing Cyclo-cross Team In August 2020, he was named in the startlist for the 2020 Tour de France.

== Major results ==
=== Cyclo-cross ===
2012–2013
3rd National Junior Championships
2013–2014
1st National Junior Championships
2nd Junior Brabant
UCI Junior World Cup

3rd Tábor
3rd Namur

3rd Junior Rucphen
4th UCI World Junior Championships
2014–2015
2nd National Under-23 Championships
5th UCI World Under-23 Championships
2015–2016
3rd Overall UCI Under-23 World Cup

1st Heusden-Zolder
3rd Lignières-en-Berry

Under-23 Bpost Bank Trophy

3rd Koppenberg

2016–2017
1st UCI World Under-23 Championships
1st National Under-23 Championships
1st Overall UCI Under-23 World Cup

1st Zeven
1st Namur
1st Heusden-Zolder
1st Hoogerheide
2nd Cauberg

2nd Overall Under-23 Superprestige

1st Gieten
1st Middelkerke
1st Hoogstraten
2nd Zonhoven
2nd Diegem
3rd Gavere
3rd Spa-Francorchamps
3rd Ruddervoorde

2nd UEC European Under-23 Championships
3rd Overall DVV Trophy

1st Ronse

3rd Brabant
2017–2018
1st National Under-23 Championships
2nd UCI World Under-23 Championships
UCI Under-23 World Cup

3rd Heusden-Zolder
3rd Hoogerheide

2018–2019
2nd Rucphen
UCI World Cup

3rd Heusden-Zolder
4th Namur

3rd Woerden
2019–2020
2nd Woerden
3rd National Championships
2022–2023
2nd National Championships
UCI World Cup

3rd Besançon
4th Beekse Bergen
5th Hulst
5th Overijse

4th UEC European Championships
2023–2024
1st National Championships
2nd UCI World Championships
2nd Overall UCI World Cup

1st Val di Sole
2nd Hulst
2nd Zonhoven
2nd Hoogerheide
3rd Troyes
4th Waterloo
4th Gavere
5th Antwerpen

2nd Overall Superprestige

1st Merksplas
1st Boom
2nd Niel
3rd Heusden-Zolder

1st Indianapolis I
X²O Badkamers Trophy

3rd Brussels

2024–2025
Superprestige

1st Middelkerke

1st Oostmalle
X²O Badkamers Trophy

2nd Brussels

3rd National Championships
UCI World Cup

3rd Maasmechelen

4th UCI World Championships
2025–2026
1st Overall X²O Badkamers Trophy

1st Lokeren
3rd Hamme
3rd Loenhout

Superprestige

1st Merksplas
2nd Ruddervoorde
3rd Gullegem

1st Heerderstrand
UCI World Cup

2nd Terralba
3rd Tábor

4th UCI World Championships
2026-2027
1st Woerden
Superprestige

3rd Niel

4th UEC European Championships

=== Road ===
2014
5th Overall Driedaagse van Axel
2016
1st Mountains classification, Boucles de la Mayenne
2018
9th Antwerp Port Epic
2019
6th Road race, European Games
7th Overall Tour of Norway
2020
3rd Paris–Tours

==== Grand Tour general classification results timeline ====
Grand Tour	2020	2021
Giro d'Italia	—	—
Tour de France	103	128
Vuelta a España	—	—

Legend
—	Did not compete
DNF	Did not finish
