= Citadelcross Namur =

Cyclo-cross race in Namur, Belgium

Cyclo-cross Namur

Race details
- Region: Namur, Belgium
- English name: Cross of the Citadel
- Local names: Cyclo-cross de la Citadelle (in French); Citadelcross (in Dutch)
- Discipline: Cyclo-cross
- Competition: UCI World Cup

History
- First edition: 2009
- Editions: 17 (as of 2025)
- First winner: Niels Albert (BEL)
- Most wins: Mathieu van der Poel (NED) (6)
- Most recent: Mathieu van der Poel (NED)

The Cyclo-cross Namur, also called the Citadelcross, is a cyclo-cross race in Namur, Belgium. The track is on the hills around the citadel there. First held in 2009, it was originally part of the Gazet van Antwerpen Trophy but became part of the UCI Cyclo-cross World Cup in the 2011–2012 season.

The track is considered one of the heaviest and sometimes compared to a mountain-bike track.

== Winners ==
=== Male ===
Year	Winner	Second	Third
2025	Mathieu van der Poel (NED)	Thibau Nys (BEL)	Michael Vanthourenhout (BEL)
2024	Michael Vanthourenhout (BEL)	Toon Aerts (BEL)	Emiel Verstrynge (BEL)
2023	Tom Pidcock (GBR)	Pim Ronhaar (NED)	Joris Nieuwenhuis (NED)
2022	Michael Vanthourenhout (BEL)	Lars van der Haar (NED)	Laurens Sweeck (BEL)
2021	Michael Vanthourenhout (BEL)	Tom Pidcock (GBR)	Toon Aerts (BEL)
2020	Mathieu van der Poel (NED)	Wout Van Aert (BEL)	Tom Pidcock (GBR)
2019	Mathieu van der Poel (NED)	Toon Aerts (BEL)	Corné van Kessel (NED)
2018	Mathieu van der Poel (NED)	Wout Van Aert (BEL)	Toon Aerts (BEL)
2017	Wout Van Aert (BEL)	Toon Aerts (BEL)	Mathieu van der Poel (NED)
2016	Mathieu van der Poel (NED)	Wout Van Aert (BEL)	Kevin Pauwels (BEL)
2015	Mathieu van der Poel (NED)	Wout Van Aert (BEL)	Kevin Pauwels (BEL)
2014	Kevin Pauwels (BEL)	Lars van der Haar (NED)	Philipp Walsleben (GER)
2013	Francis Mourey (FRA)	Klaas Vantornout (BEL)	Niels Albert (BEL)
2012	Kevin Pauwels (BEL)	Sven Nys (BEL)	Niels Albert (BEL)
2011	Sven Nys (BEL)	Niels Albert (BEL)	Klaas Vantornout (BEL)
2010	Zdeněk Štybar (CZE)	Klaas Vantornout (BEL)	Kevin Pauwels (BEL)
2009	Niels Albert (BEL)	Sven Nys (BEL)	Zdeněk Štybar (CZE)

=== Female ===
Year	Winner	Second	Third
2025	Lucinda Brand (NED)	Aniek van Alphen (NED)	Amandine Fouquenet (FRA)
2024	Ceylin del Carmen Alvarado (NED)	Lucinda Brand (NED)	Puck Pieterse (NED)
2023	Ceylin del Carmen Alvarado (NED)	Lucinda Brand (NED)	Puck Pieterse (NED)
2022	Fem van Empel (NED)	Ceylin del Carmen Alvarado (NED)	Blanka Vas (HUN)
2021	Lucinda Brand (NED)	Denise Betsema (NED)	Puck Pieterse (NED)
2020	Lucinda Brand (NED)	Clara Honsinger (USA)	Denise Betsema (NED)
2019	Lucinda Brand (NED)	Ceylin del Carmen Alvarado (NED)	Annemarie Worst (NED)
2018	Lucinda Brand (NED)	Marianne Vos (NED)	Annemarie Worst (NED)
2017	Evie Richards (GBR)	Nikki Brammeier (GBR)	Eva Lechner (ITA)
2016	Kateřina Nash (CZE)	Eva Lechner (ITA)	Sophie de Boer (NED)
2015	Nikki Harris (GBR)	Caroline Mani (FRA)	Eva Lechner (ITA)
2014	Kateřina Nash (CZE)	Marianne Vos (NED)	Katie Compton (USA)
2013	Katie Compton (USA)	Marianne Vos (NED)	Nikki Harris (GBR)
2012	Katie Compton (USA)	Kateřina Nash (CZE)	Marianne Vos (NED)
2011	Marianne Vos (NED)	Lucie Chainel-Lefèvre (FRA)	Katie Compton (USA)
2010	Sanne van Paassen (NED)	Daphny van den Brand (NED)	Sanne Cant (BEL)
2009	Daphny van den Brand (NED)	Pavla Havliková (CZE)	Helen Wyman (UK)
