= UCI Cyclo-cross World Cup =

Annual series of cyclo-cross races

- 2025–26 UCI Cyclo-cross World Cup

Race details
- Date: November–January
- Region: Europe
- Discipline: Cyclo-cross
- Organiser: UCI
- Web site: www.ucicyclocrossworldcup.com

History (men)
- First edition: 1993
- First winner: Paul Herygers (BEL)
- Most wins: Richard Groenendaal (NED); Sven Nys (BEL); Wout Van Aert (BEL) (3 wins)
- Most recent: Mathieu van der Poel (NED)

History (women)
- First edition: 2002
- First winner: Daphny van den Brand (NED)
- Most wins: Daphny van den Brand (NED); Sanne Cant (BEL); Lucinda Brand (NED); (3 wins)
- Most recent: Lucinda Brand (NED)

The UCI Cyclo-cross World Cup is a season-long competition in cyclo-cross, organised by the Union Cycliste Internationale (UCI) and Flanders Classics. First held in the 1993–1994 season, there are currently six awards, tailored to the different categories of riders: Elite Men, Elite Women, Under 23 Men, Under 23 Women, Junior Men and Junior Women.

The World Cup is not to be confused with the World Championship, also organised by the UCI, which is a single one day race that awards the winner with a rainbow jersey to be worn in every race till the next World Championship. Typically the World Championships are held a week or two after the end of the World Cup at the end of January or early February.

In November 2014 the first round of the World Cup ever to take place outside mainland Europe was held in Milton Keynes, England. The following September, the CrossVegas competition was incorporated into the World Cup for the first time, becoming the first World Cup round to be held in the United States.

== Race Categories ==
There are 5 race categories.

- Elite Men
- Elite Women
- Under-23 Men (aged 19 to 22)
- Junior Men (aged 17 and 18)
- Junior Women (aged 17 and 18)

Women Under-23 (aged 19 to 22) take part in the Elite Women race but a separate ranking and award ceremony is organized for Under-23 contestants.

== Points ==
During each race the World Cup classification points are awarded based on the following table.

Allocation of World Cup points
Place	1	2	3	4	5	6	7	8	9	10	11	12	13	14	15	16	17	18	19	20	21	22	23	24	25
Points	40	30	25	22	21	20	19	18	17	16	15	14	13	12	11	10	9	8	7	6	5	4	3	2	1

For Under-23 and junior classification only the best 4 or 5 results, depending on the number of races, are taken into account for the final world cup classification.

== Jersey ==
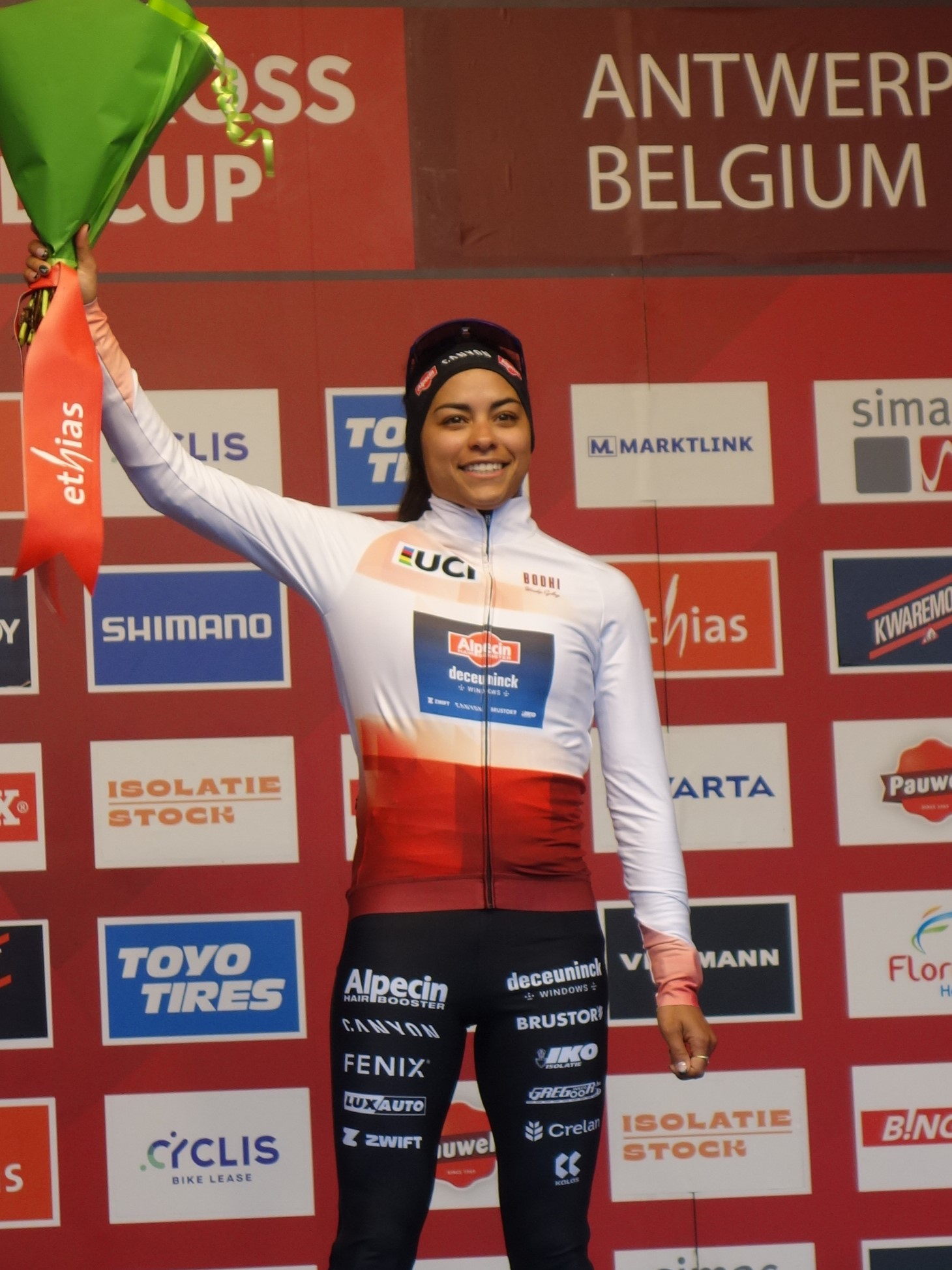
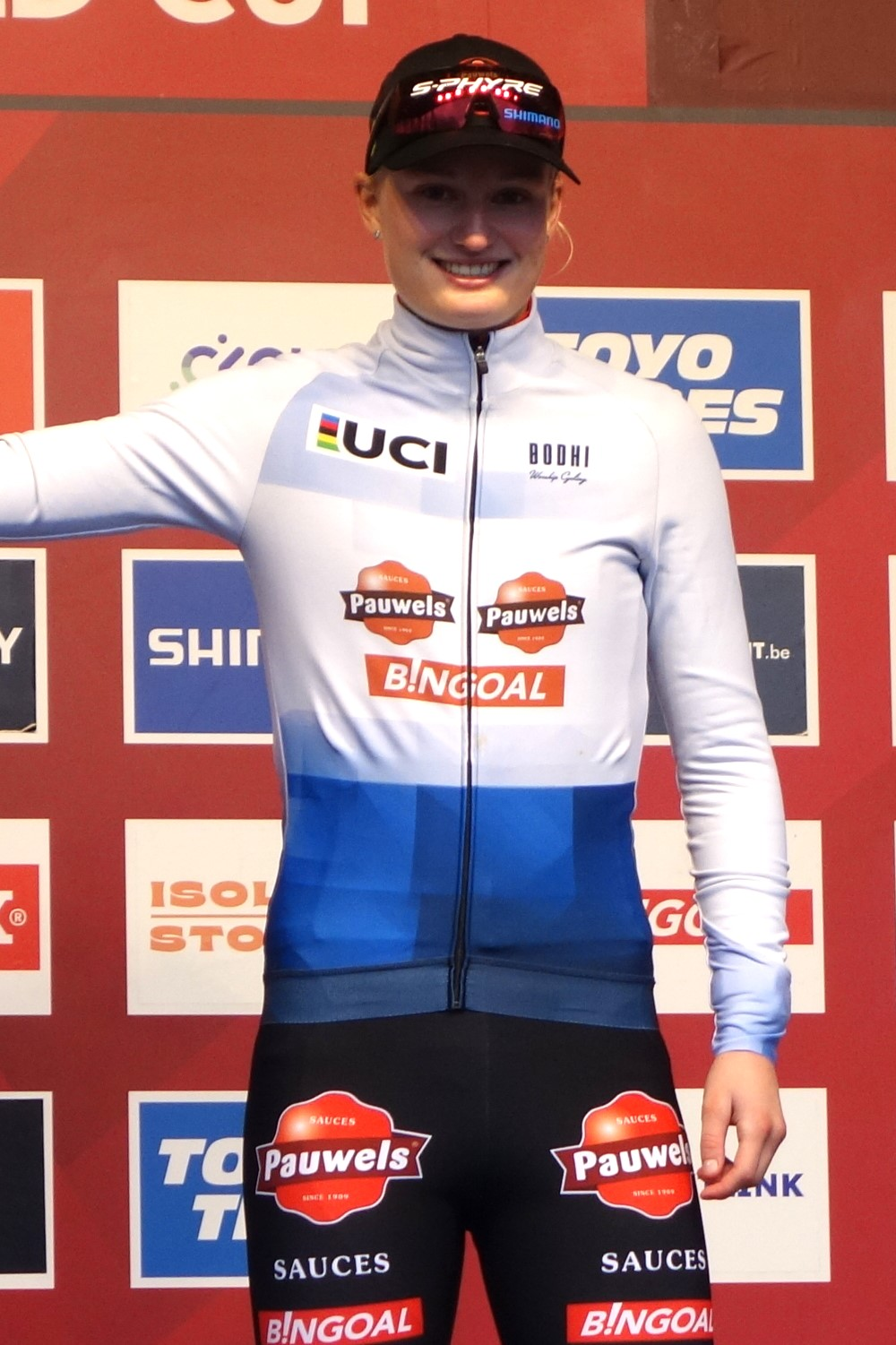
Pre-2025 jerseys: Ceylin del Carmen Alvarado in Elite Women's World Cup leader jersey (left) and Leonie Bentveld in Under-23 Women's World Cup leader jersey (right) after the Scheldecross in 2023.

At the end of each race the leader of the general classification in each category is awarded a special jersey. This jersey is to be worn only at the world cup races. For most categories the jersey is white and red, except for Under-23 Women's leader jersey which is white and blue. In 2025 the design was changed, adding black color to the jersey.

== Elite Men ==
Year	First	Second	Third
1993–94	(Belgium) Paul Herygers	(Belgium) Danny De Bie	(Belgium) Marc Janssens
1994–95	(Italy) Daniele Pontoni	(France) Dominique Arnould	(Czech Republic) Radomír Šimůnek
1995–96	(Italy) Luca Bramati	(Netherlands) Richard Groenendaal	(Switzerland) Beat Wabel
1996–97	(Netherlands) Adrie van der Poel	(Netherlands) Richard Groenendaal	(Belgium) Marc Janssens
1997–98	(Netherlands) Richard Groenendaal	(Netherlands) Adrie van der Poel	(Italy) Daniele Pontoni
1998–99	(Belgium) Mario De Clercq	(Italy) Daniele Pontoni	(Belgium) Sven Nys
1999–00	(Belgium) Sven Nys	(Netherlands) Richard Groenendaal	(Belgium) Mario De Clercq
2000–01	(Netherlands) Richard Groenendaal	(Belgium) Bart Wellens	(Belgium) Mario De Clercq
2001–02	(Belgium) Sven Nys	(Belgium) Mario De Clercq	(Belgium) Bart Wellens
2002–03	(Belgium) Bart Wellens	(Belgium) Sven Nys	(Belgium) Mario De Clercq
2003–04	(Netherlands) Richard Groenendaal	(Belgium) Sven Nys	(Belgium) Bart Wellens
2004–05	Not awarded for individuals		
2005–06	Not awarded for individuals		
2006–07	Not awarded for individuals		
2007–08	Not awarded for individuals		
2008–09	(Belgium) Sven Nys	(Belgium) Bart Wellens	(Czech Republic) Zdeněk Štybar
2009–10	(Czech Republic) Zdeněk Štybar	(Belgium) Niels Albert	(Belgium) Sven Nys
2010–11	(Belgium) Niels Albert	(Belgium) Kevin Pauwels	(Belgium) Sven Nys
2011–12	(Belgium) Kevin Pauwels	(Belgium) Sven Nys	(Czech Republic) Zdeněk Štybar
2012–13	(Belgium) Niels Albert	(Belgium) Kevin Pauwels	(Belgium) Sven Nys
2013–14	(Netherlands) Lars van der Haar	(Germany) Philipp Walsleben	(Belgium) Niels Albert
2014–15	(Belgium) Kevin Pauwels	(Netherlands) Lars van der Haar	(Netherlands) Corné van Kessel
2015–16	(Belgium) Wout van Aert	(Netherlands) Lars van der Haar	(Belgium) Kevin Pauwels
2016–17	(Belgium) Wout van Aert	(Belgium) Kevin Pauwels	(Belgium) Tom Meeusen
2017–18	(Netherlands) Mathieu van der Poel	(Belgium) Wout van Aert	(Belgium) Toon Aerts
2018–19	(Belgium) Toon Aerts	(Belgium) Wout van Aert	(Netherlands) Mathieu van der Poel
2019–20	(Belgium) Toon Aerts	(Belgium) Eli Iserbyt	(Belgium) Michael Vanthourenhout
2020–21	(Belgium) Wout van Aert	(Netherlands) Mathieu van der Poel	(Belgium) Michael Vanthourenhout
2021–22	(Belgium) Eli Iserbyt	(Belgium) Michael Vanthourenhout	(Belgium) Toon Aerts
2022–23	(Belgium) Laurens Sweeck	(Belgium) Michael Vanthourenhout	(Belgium) Eli Iserbyt
2023–24	(Belgium) Eli Iserbyt	(Netherlands) Joris Nieuwenhuis	(Netherlands) Pim Ronhaar
2024–25	(Belgium) Michael Vanthourenhout	(Belgium) Toon Aerts	(Belgium) Joran Wyseure
2025–26	(Netherlands) Mathieu van der Poel	(Belgium) Thibau Nys	(Belgium) Niels Vandeputte

- Winners: (Belgium) :19 - (Netherlands) :7 - (Italy) :2 - (Czech Republic) :1

== Elite Women ==
Year	First	Second	Third
2002–03	(Netherlands) Daphny van den Brand	(Belgium) Hilde Quintens	(Belgium) Anja Nobus
2003–04	(Germany) Hanka Kupfernagel	(Netherlands) Marianne Vos	(France) Maryline Salvetat
2004–05	Not awarded for individuals		
2005–06	Not awarded for individuals		
2006–07	Not awarded for individuals		
2007–08	Not awarded for individuals		
2008–09	(Germany) Hanka Kupfernagel	(Netherlands) Daphny van den Brand	(United States) Katie Compton
2009–10	(Netherlands) Daphny van den Brand	(Netherlands) Marianne Vos	(Netherlands) Sanne van Paassen
2010–11	(Netherlands) Sanne van Paassen	(United States) Katie Compton	(Netherlands) Marianne Vos
2011–12	(Netherlands) Daphny van den Brand	(Netherlands) Marianne Vos	(United States) Katie Compton
2012–13	(United States) Katie Compton	(Netherlands) Sanne van Paassen	(United Kingdom) Nikki Harris
2013–14	(United States) Katie Compton	(United Kingdom) Nikki Harris	(Netherlands) Marianne Vos
2014–15	(Belgium) Sanne Cant	(Belgium) Ellen Van Loy	(United States) Katie Compton
2015–16	(Belgium) Sanne Cant	(Italy) Eva Lechner	(United Kingdom) Nikki Harris
2016–17	(Netherlands) Sophie de Boer	(Belgium) Sanne Cant	(Czech Republic) Kateřina Nash
2017–18	(Belgium) Sanne Cant	(United States) Kaitlin Keough	(Italy) Eva Lechner
2018–19	(Netherlands) Marianne Vos	(Belgium) Sanne Cant	(Netherlands) Annemarie Worst
2019–20	(Netherlands) Annemarie Worst	(Netherlands) Ceylin del Carmen Alvarado	(Czech Republic) Kateřina Nash
2020–21	(Netherlands) Lucinda Brand	(Netherlands) Ceylin del Carmen Alvarado	(Netherlands) Denise Betsema
2021–22	(Netherlands) Lucinda Brand	(Netherlands) Denise Betsema	(Netherlands) Puck Pieterse
2022–23	(Netherlands) Fem van Empel	(Netherlands) Puck Pieterse	(Netherlands) Shirin van Anrooij
2023–24	(Netherlands) Ceylin del Carmen Alvarado	(Netherlands) Puck Pieterse	(Netherlands) Lucinda Brand
2024–25	(Netherlands) Lucinda Brand	(Netherlands) Fem van Empel	(Hungary) Blanka Kata Vas
2025–26	(Netherlands) Lucinda Brand	(Netherlands) Aniek van Alphen	(France) Amandine Fouquenet

- Winner : (Netherlands) :13 - (Belgium) :3 - (Germany) :2 - (United States) :2 -

== Under-23 Men ==
Year	First	Second	Third
2004–05	(Czech Republic) Martin Bína	(Switzerland) Simon Zahner	(Czech Republic) Zdeněk Štybar
2005–06	(Belgium) Kevin Pauwels	(France) Romain Villa	(Belgium) Dieter Vanthourenhout
2006–07	(Belgium) Niels Albert	(Belgium) Dieter Vanthourenhout	(Czech Republic) Lukáš Klouček
2007–08	(Belgium) Niels Albert	(France) Aurélien Duval	(France) Jonathan Lopez
2008–09	(Germany) Philipp Walsleben	(France) Aurélien Duval	(Belgium) Kenneth Van Compernolle
2009–10	(Belgium) Tom Meeusen	(Slovakia) Róbert Gavenda	(France) Arnaud Jouffroy
2010–11	(Netherlands) Lars van der Haar	(France) Matthieu Boulo	(Belgium) Vincent Baestaens
2011–12	(Netherlands) Lars van der Haar	(Netherlands) Mike Teunissen	(France) Julian Alaphilippe
2012–13	(Belgium) Wietse Bosmans	(Belgium) Wout van Aert	(Netherlands) Corné van Kessel
2013–14	(Netherlands) Mathieu van der Poel	(Belgium) Wout van Aert	(Belgium) Laurens Sweeck
2014–15	(Belgium) Michael Vanthourenhout	(Belgium) Laurens Sweeck	(Belgium) Wout van Aert
2015–16	(Belgium) Eli Iserbyt	(Belgium) Quinten Hermans	(Netherlands) Joris Nieuwenhuis
2016–17	(Netherlands) Joris Nieuwenhuis	(Belgium) Quinten Hermans	(France) Clément Russo
2017–18	(United Kingdom) Tom Pidcock	(Belgium) Eli Iserbyt	(Belgium) Thijs Aerts
2018–19	(United Kingdom) Tom Pidcock	(Belgium) Eli Iserbyt	(France) Antoine Benoist
2019–20	(Switzerland) Kevin Kuhn	(Netherlands) Ryan Kamp	(France) Antoine Benoist
2020–21	(United Kingdom) Thomas Mein	(United Kingdom) Ben Turner	(Spain) Iván Feijoo
2021–22	(Netherlands) Mees Hendrikx	(Netherlands) Pim Ronhaar	(Belgium) Emiel Verstrynge
2022–23	(Belgium) Thibau Nys	(Netherlands) Tibor del Grosso	(Belgium) Witse Meeussen
2023–24	(Netherlands) Tibor del Grosso	(Belgium) Emiel Verstrynge	(Belgium) Jente Michels
2024–25	(Netherlands) Tibor del Grosso	(Belgium) Jente Michels	(France) Aubin Sparfel
2025–26	(Netherlands) David Haverdings	(France) Aubin Sparfel	(Belgium) Yordi Corsus

- Winners : (Belgium) :8 - (Netherlands) :8 - (United Kingdom) :3 - (Czech Republic) :1 - (Germany) :1 - (Switzerland) :1

== Under-23 Women ==
Year	First	Second	Third
2018–19	(Netherlands) Ceylin del Carmen Alvarado	(Netherlands) Fleur Nagengast	(Netherlands) Inge van der Heijden
2019–20	(Netherlands) Ceylin del Carmen Alvarado	(Netherlands) Inge van der Heijden	(United Kingdom) Anna Kay
2020–21	(Hungary) Blanka Kata Vas	(Netherlands) Manon Bakker	(Netherlands) Puck Pieterse
2021–22	(Netherlands) Puck Pieterse	(Netherlands) Fem van Empel	(Netherlands) Shirin van Anrooij
2022–23	(Netherlands) Shirin van Anrooij	(Luxembourg) Marie Schreiber	(France) Line Burquier
2023–24	(Netherlands) Leonie Bentveld	(United Kingdom) Zoe Bäckstedt	(Luxembourg) Marie Schreiber
2024–25	(United Kingdom) Zoe Bäckstedt	(Luxembourg) Marie Schreiber	(Netherlands) Leonie Bentveld
2025–26	(Netherlands) Leonie Bentveld	(France) Célia Gery	(Belgium) Fleur Moors

- Winners : (Netherlands) : 6 - (Hungary) : 1 - (United Kingdom) : 1

== Junior Men ==
Year	First	Second	Third
2004–05	(Italy) Davide Malacarne	(Netherlands) Ricardo van der Velde	(Switzerland) Julien Taramarcaz
2005–06	(Slovakia) Róbert Gavenda	(Belgium) Tom Meeusen	(Netherlands) Boy van Poppel
2006–07	(Belgium) Joeri Adams	(Czech Republic) Jiří Polnický	(France) Thomas Girard
2007–08	(France) Arnaud Jouffroy	(Czech Republic) Lubomír Petruš	(Belgium) Stef Boden
2008–09	(Netherlands) Tijmen Eising	(Netherlands) Lars van der Haar	(Belgium) Wietse Bosmans
2009–10	(Netherlands) David van der Poel	(Netherlands) Gert-Jan Bosman	(Belgium) Jens Vandekinderen
2010–11	(Belgium) Laurens Sweeck	(Belgium) Daniel Peeters	(Switzerland) Lars Forster
2011–12	(Netherlands) Mathieu van der Poel	(France) Quentin Jauregui	(France) Romain Seigle
2012–13	(Netherlands) Mathieu van der Poel	(Netherlands) Martijn Budding	(United States) Logan Owen
2013–14	(Czech Republic) Adam Toupalik	(Belgium) Yannick Peeters	(Belgium) Kobe Goossens
2014–15	(Belgium) Eli Iserbyt	(Switzerland) Johan Jacobs	(Netherlands) Max Gulickx
2015–16	(Netherlands) Jens Dekker	(Belgium) Jappe Jaspers	(France) Tanguy Turgis
2016–17	(Belgium) Toon Vandebosch	(France) Antoine Benoist	(United Kingdom) Tom Pidcock
2017–18	(Czech Republic) Tomáš Kopecký	(Netherlands) Pim Ronhaar	(Netherlands) Mees Hendrikx
2018–19	(Belgium) Witse Meeussen	(Belgium) Ryan Cortjens	(Belgium) Thibau Nys
2019–20	(Belgium) Thibau Nys	(Switzerland) Dario Lillo	(Belgium) Lennert Belmans
2020–21	(Czech Republic) Matěj Stránský	(Italy) Lorenzo Masciarelli	(Czech Republic) Matyáš Fiala
2021–22	(Netherlands) David Haverdings	(France) Louka Lesueur	(United Kingdom) Nathan Smith
2022–23	(France) Léo Bisiaux	(Belgium) Yordi Corsus	(Belgium) Viktor Vandenberghe
2023–24	(Italy) Stefano Viezzi	(France) Aubin Sparfel	(Netherlands) Keije Solen
2024–25	(France) Soren Bruyère Joumard	(Italy) Mattia Agostinacchio	(Belgium) Giel Lejeune
2025–26	(Italy) Patrik Pezzo Rosola	(France) Soren Bruyère Joumard	(Italy) Filippo Grigolini

- Winners : (Belgium) : 6 - (Netherlands) : 6 - (Czech Republic) : 3 - (France) : 3 - (Italy) : 3 - (Slovakia) : 1

== Junior Women ==
Year	First	Second	Third
2020–21	(United Kingdom) Zoe Bäckstedt	(Luxembourg) Marie Schreiber	(Italy) Lucia Bramati
2021–22	(Netherlands) Leonie Bentveld	(United Kingdom) Zoe Bäckstedt	(Netherlands) Lauren Molengraaf
2022–23	(Netherlands) Lauren Molengraaf	(Canada) Ava Holmgren	(Canada) Isabella Holmgren
2023–24	(France) Célia Gery	(United Kingdom) Cat Ferguson	(Slovakia) Viktória Chladoňová
2024–25	(Canada) Rafaelle Carrier	(France) Lise Revol	(Czech Republic) Barbora Bukovská
2025–26	(France) Lise Revol	(Italy) Giorgia Pellizotti	(Czech Republic) Barbora Bukovská

- Winners : (Netherlands) : 2 - (France) : 2 - (United Kingdom) : 1 - (Canada) : 1

== Winners per country ==
Country	Total	Elite Men	Elite Women	Men's U23	Women's U23	Junior Men	Junior Women
Belgium	36	19	3	8		6	
Canada	1						1
Czech Republic	5	1		1		3	
France	5					3	2
Germany	3		2	1			
Hungary	1				1		
Italy	5	2				3	
Netherlands	42	7	13	8	6	6	2
Slovakia	1					1	
Switzerland	1			1			
United Kingdom	5			3	1		1
United States	2		2				

== Races ==
Location	Race	Seasons
Belgium
**Antwerp**	Scheldecross	22/23, 23/24, 24/25, 25/26
**Dendermonde**	Ambiancecross	20/21, 21/22, 23/24, 24/25, 25/26
**Gavere**	Cyclo-cross Gavere	22/23, 23/24, 24/25, 25/26
Heusden-Zolder	Grand Prix Eric De Vlaeminck	00/01, 08/09, 09/10, 10/11, 11/12, 12/13, 13/14, 14/15, 15/16, 16/17, 17/18, 18/19, 19/20
Hofstade	Kersttrofee Hofstade	04/05, 05/06, 06/07, 07/08
Hooglede	Cyclo-cross Hooglede	05/06
Kalmthout	Bosduincross	99/00, 02/03, 05/06, 06/07, 07/08, 08/09, 09/10, 10/11
Kluisbergen	GP Mario De Clercq	01/02, 04/05
**Koksijde**	Duinencross	96/97, 97/98, 98/99, 03/04, 04/05, 06/07, 07/08, 08/09, 09/10, 10/11, 11/12, 12/13, 13/14, 14/15, 15/16, 16/17, 17/18, 18/19, 19/20, 21/22, 25/26
Loenhout	Azencross	93/94, 94/95, 95/96
**Maasmechelen**	Cyclo-cross Maasmechelen	22/23, 23/24, 24/25, 25/26
**Namur**	Citadelcross	11/12, 12/13, 13/14, 14/15, 15/16, 16/17, 17/18, 18/19, 19/20, 20/21, 21/22, 23/24, 24/25, 25/26
Overijse	Druivencross	20/21,21/22,22/23
**Zonhoven**	Cyclo-cross Zonhoven	21/22, 22/23, 23/24, 24/25, 25/26
Czech Republic
Pilsen	Cyklokros Plzeň	09/10, 10/11, 11/12, 12/13
Prague	Cyclo-cross Prague	95/96, 96/97, 97/98
**Tábor**	Cyklokros Tábor	98/99, 99/00, 00/01, 04/05, 06/07, 07/08, 08/09, 11/12, 12/13, 13/14, 18/19, 19/20, 20/21, 21/22, 22/23, 25/26
Denmark
Bogense	Cross Denmark	17/18
France
Besançon	Cyclo-cross Besançon	21/22, 22/23, 24/25
**Flamanville**	Cyclo-cross Flamanville	21/22, 23/24, 25/26
Lanarvily	Cyclo-cross Lanarvily	04/05
Liévin	Cyclo-cross Liévin	02/03, 05/06, 07/08, 11/12
Lignières-en-Berry	Cyclo-cross Lignières-en-Berry	15/16
Nommay	Grand Prix Nommay	96/97, 98/99, 99/00, 01/02, 03/04, 04/05, 06/07, 08/09, 09/10, 13/14, 17/18, 19/20
Pontchâteau	Cyclo-cross Pontchâteau	95/96, 97/98, 00/01, 10/11, 18/19
Roubaix	GP Lille Métropole	08/09, 09/10, 12/13
Sablé-sur-Sarthe	Cyclo-cross Sablé-sur-Sarthe	94/95
Saint-Herblain	Cyclo-cross Saint-Herblain	93/94
Troyes	Cyclo-cross Troyes	23/24
Germany
Frankfurt	Frankfurter Rad-Cross	02/03
Sankt Wendel	Cyclo-cross Sankt Wendel	03/04
Zeven	Cyclo-cross Zeven	16/17, 17/18
Ireland
Dublin	Cyclo-cross Dublin	22/23, 23/24, 24/25
Italy
Azzano Decimo	Cyclo-cross Azzano Decimo	94/95
Basiliano	Cyclo-cross Basiliano	95/96
Bergamo	Cyclo-cross Bergamo	00/01
Fiuggi	Cyclo-cross Fiuggi	16/17
Milan	Trofeo Mamma & Papà Guerciotti	04/05, 05/06, 06/07, 07/08, 08/09
Monopoli	Cyclo-cross Monopoli	01/02
Prata di Pordenone	Cyclo-cross Prata di Pordenone	96/97
Rome	Memorial Romano Scotti	12/13, 13/14
Solbiate Olona	Cyclo-cross Solbiate Olona	97/98
**Terralba**	Cyclo-cross Terralba-Sardinia	25/26
Treviso	Grand Prix Lago le Bandie	06/07, 09/10
Turin	Cyclo-cross Turin	03/04
Val di Sole	Cyclo-cross Val di Sole	21/22, 22/23, 23/24
Luxembourg
Leudelange	Cyclo-cross Leudelange	98/99, 99/00, 00/01
Netherlands
Eindhoven	Cyclo-cross Eindhoven	93/94
Heerlen	Cyclo-cross Heerlen	95/96, 96/97, 97/98, 01/02
Hilvarenbeek	GP Beekse Bergen	22/23
**Hoogerheide**	Grand Prix Adrie van der Poel	02/03, 04/05, 05/06, 06/07, 07/08, 09/10, 10/11, 11/12, 12/13, 14/15, 15/16, 16/17, 17/18, 18/19, 19/20, 21/22, 23/24, 24/25, 25/26
Hulst	Vestingcross	20/21, 21/22, 22/23, 23/24, 24/25
Pijnacker	Veldrit Pijnacker	03/04, 04/05, 05/06, 06/07, 07/08, 08/09
Rucphen	Cyclo-cross Rupchen	21/22
Valkenburg	Caubergcross	13/14, 14/15, 15/16, 16/17
Zeddam	GP Montferland	98/99, 99/00, 00/01
Spain
**Benidorm**	Cyclo-cross Benidorm	22/23, 23/24, 24/25, 25/26
Igorre	Ziklokross Igorre	93/94, 94/95, 95/96, 01/02, 05/06, 06/07, 07/08, 08/09, 09/10, 10/11, 11/12
Switzerland
Aigle	Cyclophile Aigle	04/05, 06/07, 10/11
Bern	EKZ CrossTour Bern	18/19, 19/20
Eschenbach	Cyclo-cross Eschenbach	93/94, 96/97, 97/98, 98/99
Safenwil	Cyclo-cross Safenwil	99/00
Wangen	Cyclo-cross Wangen	94/95, 95/96
Wetzikon	Cyclo-cross Wetzikon	01/02, 02/03, 03/04, 04/05, 05/06
United Kingdom
Milton Keynes	Cyclo-cross Milton Keynes	14/15
United States
Fayetteville	Cyclo-cross Fayetteville	21/22, 22/23
Iowa City	Jingle Cross	16/17, 17/18, 18/19, 19/20, 21/22
Las Vegas	CrossVegas	15/16, 16/17
Waterloo	Cyclo-cross Waterloo	17/18, 18/19, 19/20, 21/22, 22/23, 23/24

- Boldface indicates the current season's races.

== See also ==
- Superprestige
- Cyclo-cross Trophy
