= Nikki Brammeier =

British cyclist

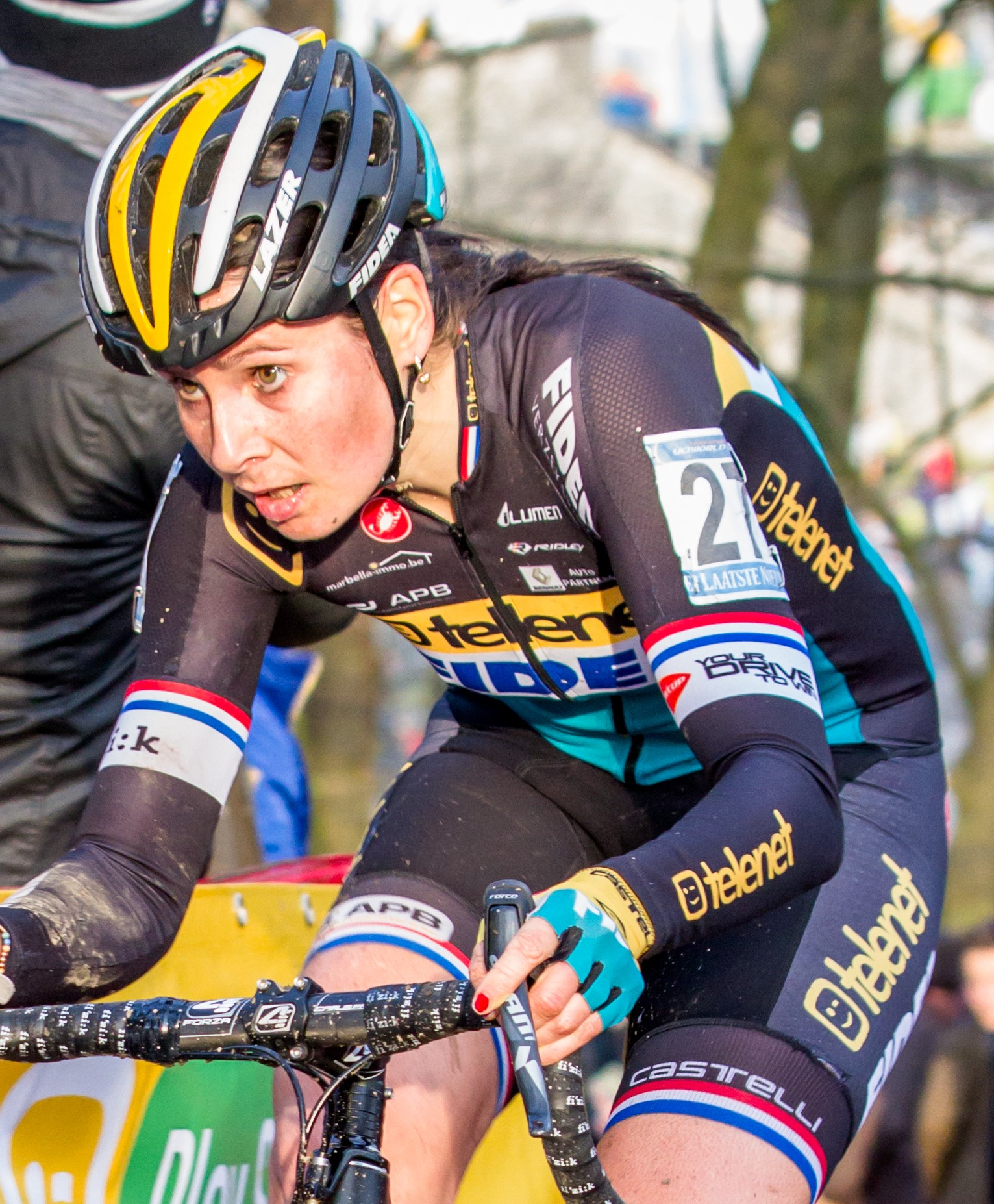
- Brammeier at Cyclo-cross Namur in 2015

Personal information
- Full name: Nikki Louise Brammeier
- Born: Nikki Louise Harris; 30 December 1986 (age 39) Derby, United Kingdom
- Height: 1.76 m (5 ft 9 in)

Cycling career
- Sport: Cycling
- Current team: Retired
- Discipline: Cyclo-cross
- Role: Rider
- Rider type: All-rounder

Professional teams
- 2006: Science in Sport
- 2007: Global Racing Team
- 2008: Wielerteam De Sprinters Malderen
- 2009: Moving Ladies
- 2009: Team Flexpoint
- 2010: AVB Cycling Team
- 2011–2015: Telenet–Fidea
- 2016–2017: Boels–Dolmans
- 2018–2019: MUDIIITA–Canyon

Major wins
- Cyclo-cross National Championships (2013, 2016, 2017, 2019)

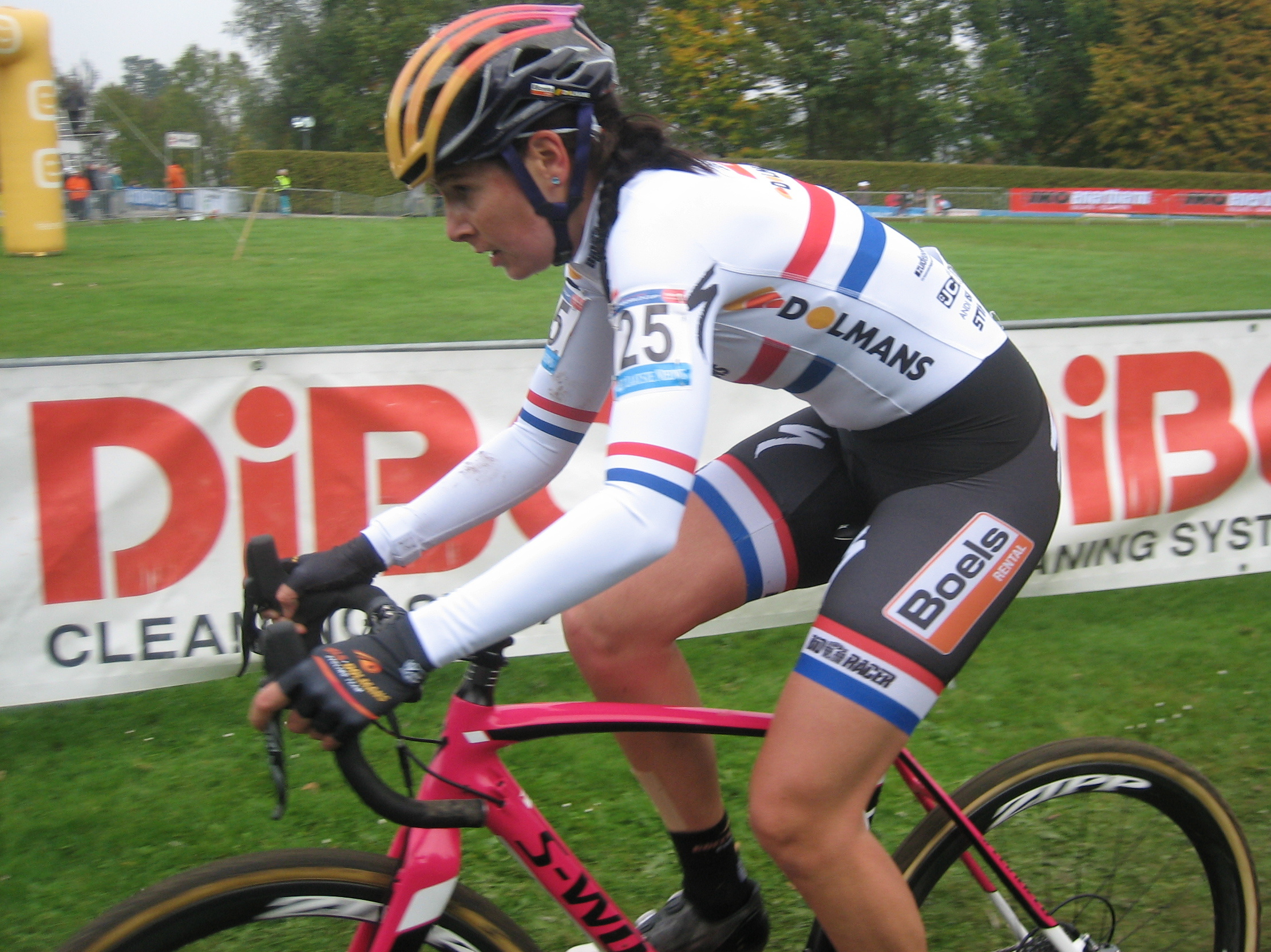
Harris, 2016 Valkenburg

Nikki Louise Brammeier (née Harris; born 30 December 1986) is an English former professional racing cyclist from Draycott, Derbyshire. She began cycling at five and has won championships in various disciplines. Brammeier has competed in international events including the UCI Track Cycling World Cup Classics and the Commonwealth Games. She won her first UCI Cyclo-cross World Cup in 2015 at Cyclo-cross Namur.

In November 2017 Brammeier announced that she would be leaving the Boels–Dolmans team at the end of the year in order to focus solely on cyclo-cross. The following month she and her husband Matt Brammeier announced the establishment of the MUDIIITA cyclo-cross project, intended to encourage participation in the sport in the UK, including a professional team known as MUDIIITA–Canyon.

In June 2019 Brammeier announced her pregnancy and her retirement from cyclo-cross. In November of that year, Brammeier gave birth to a daughter.

== Major results ==
=== Mountain bike ===
2004
1st Cross-country, National Junior Championships
2011
2nd Cross-country, National Championships
2012
1st Cross-country, National Championships
2018
3rd Cross-country, National Championships

=== Road ===
2005
1st Straiton, Women's National Series
2007
1st Road race, National Under-23 Championships
4th National Criterium Championships
2016
1st Stage 1 (TTT) Energiewacht Tour

=== Track ===
2002–2003
National Junior Championships

1st Individual pursuit
1st 500m time trial
1st Points

2005–2006
3rd Points, UCI World Cup Classics, Sydney

=== Cyclo-cross ===
2002–2003
3rd National Championships
2003–2004
National Trophy Series

2nd Matlock
3rd Ipswich

2005–2006
National Trophy Series

3rd Chorley

2009–2010
2nd National Championships
2nd Tervuren
2010–2011
2nd National Championships
2011–2012
2nd National Championships
2nd Ruddervoorde
2nd Hoogstraten
2nd Middelkerke
2nd Overijse
2nd Zonhoven
3rd Overall Gazet van Antwerpen

3rd Koppenberg
3rd Essen
3rd Baal

Fidea Classics

3rd Neerpelt

3rd Gavere
3rd Valkenburg
3rd Heerlen
3rd Rucphen
2012–2013
1st National Championships
1st Ruddervoorde
1st Gavere
Soudal Classics

1st Niel
1st Leuven
2nd Antwerpen

2nd Overijse
3rd Overall UCI World Cup

2nd Koksijde
3rd Plzeň

Bpost Bank Trophy

2nd Koppenberg
2nd Loenhout
2nd Baal
3rd Essen

2nd Kalmthout
3rd UEC European Championships
2013–2014
1st Hamme
1st Hoogstraten
2nd Overall UCI World Cup

2nd Tábor
3rd Valkenburg
3rd Koksijde
3rd Namur

3rd Overall Bpost Bank Trophy

1st Ronse
3rd Koppenberg
3rd Essen
3rd Baal

2nd UEC European Championships
2nd National Championships
Soudal Classics

2nd Niel
3rd Leuven
3rd Antwerpen

2nd Ruddervoorde
2nd Heerlen
2nd Rucphen
3rd Gavere
3rd Overijse
2014–2015
1st Spa-Francorchamps
1st Rucphen
2nd National Championships
2nd Zonhoven
2nd Gavere
2nd Oostmalle
2nd Heerlen
3rd UEC European Championships
UCI World Cup

3rd Milton Keynes

3rd Brabant
2015–2016
1st National Championships
3rd Overall UCI World Cup

1st Namur
2nd Koksijde
3rd Hoogerheide

2nd Overall Superprestige

2nd Gieten
2nd Zonhoven
2nd Spa-Francorchamps
3rd Gavere
3rd Hoogstraten
3rd Middelkerke

BPost Bank Trophy

2nd Sint-Niklaas
3rd Ronse
3rd Koppenberg
3rd Hamme

2nd Rucphen
3rd UEC European Championships
Soudal Classics

3rd Niel

3rd Overijse
2016–2017
1st National Championships
2nd Rucphen
Superprestige

3rd Zonhoven

Soudal Classics

3rd Neerpelt

2017–2018
Soudal Classics

1st Niel
2nd Neerpelt

2nd National Championships
UCI World Cup

2nd Namur

Superprestige

2nd Gieten
2nd Gavere
3rd Zonhoven

2nd Overall DVV Trophy

2nd Essen

3rd Brabant
2018–2019
1st National Championships
UCI World Cup

2nd Koksijde

Superprestige

2nd Gavere

2nd Overijse
3rd Overall DVV Trophy

3rd Baal

3rd Gullegem
3rd Illnau
2022–2023
National Trophy Series

2nd Derby
