= 2013–14 UCI Cyclo-cross World Cup =

Bicycle racing competition

2013–2014 UCI Cyclo-cross World Cup
Details
- Dates: 20 October 2013 – 26 January 2014
- Location: Europe
- Races: 7

Champions
- Male individual champion: Lars van der Haar (Netherlands)
- Female individual champion: Katie Compton (United States)

The 2013–2014 UCI Cyclo-cross World Cup events and season-long competition took place between 20 October 2013 and 26 January 2014, sponsored by the Union Cycliste Internationale (UCI).

The men's competition was won by the Dutchman Lars van der Haar, who also won three of the seven races. World Champion Sven Nys was quickly out of competition for the general classification after having several mechanical problems in the first race, resulting in him giving up, and a total off-day in the second race where he only finished 22nd. Previous World Cup winner Niels Albert, of Belgium, won two races, but still finished only third in the general after his German teammate Philipp Walsleben; Walsleben did not win any of the races, but consistently ranked highly, grabbing four podium spots.

Katie Compton of the United States dominated the women's competition, winning five of the seven races. The remaining two were won by World Champion Marianne Vos who had undergone a cyst removal operation in November making her miss the races in Koksijde and Namur.

== Events ==
In comparison to last season's eight races, this season only had seven. Plzeň, Roubaix and Hoogerheide were taken out of the programme – the latter ultimately hosting the World Championships – while Valkenburg and Nommay were added.

| Date | Venue | Country | Elite men's winner | Elite women's winner |
|---|---|---|---|---|
| 20 October | Valkenburg | Netherlands | Lars van der Haar (NLD) | Marianne Vos (NLD) |
| 26 October | Tábor | Czech Republic | Lars van der Haar (NLD) | Katie Compton (USA) |
| 23 November | Koksijde | Belgium | Niels Albert (BEL) | Katie Compton (USA) |
| 22 December | Namur | Belgium | Francis Mourey (FRA) | Katie Compton (USA) |
| 26 December | Heusden-Zolder | Belgium | Lars van der Haar (NED) | Katie Compton (USA) |
| 5 January | Rome | Italy | Niels Albert (BEL) | Katie Compton (USA) |
| 26 January | Nommay | France | Tom Meeusen (BEL) | Marianne Vos (NED) |

== Individual standings ==
=== Men ===
| Rank | Name | Points |
|---|---|---|
| 1 | Lars van der Haar (NED) | 467 |
| 2 | Philipp Walsleben (DEU) | 409 |
| 3 | Niels Albert (BEL) | 392 |
| 4 | Kevin Pauwels (BEL) | 363 |
| 5 | Francis Mourey (FRA) | 340 |
| 6 | Klaas Vantornout (BEL) | 321 |
| 7 | Tom Meeusen (BEL) | 309 |
| 8 | Bart Aernouts (BEL) | 308 |
| 9 | Rob Peeters (BEL) | 294 |
| 10 | Thijs van Amerongen (NED) | 279 |

=== Women ===
| Rank | Name | Points |
|---|---|---|
| 1 | Katie Compton (USA) | 350 |
| 2 | Nikki Harris (GBR) | 284 |
| 3 | Marianne Vos (NED) | 270 |
| 4 | Sanne Cant (BEL) | 261 |
| 5 | Helen Wyman (GBR) | 214 |
| 6 | Ellen Van Loy (BEL) | 190 |
| 7 | Eva Lechner (ITA) | 150 |
| 8 | Lucie Chainel-Lefèvre (FRA) | 145 |
| 9 | Sophie de Boer (NED) | 144 |
| 10 | Pavla Havlíková (CZE) | 139 |
