= Philipp Walsleben =

German racing cyclist

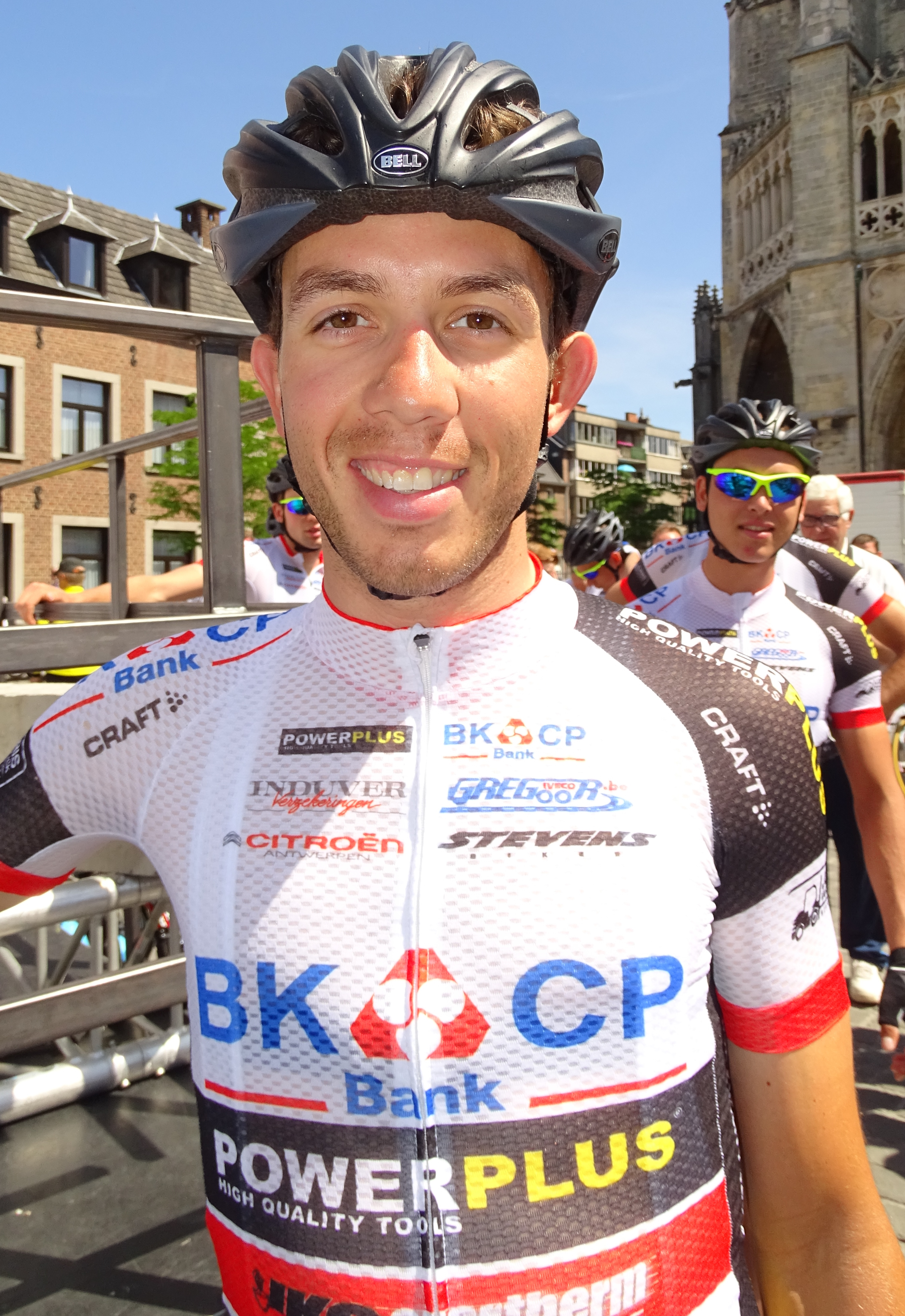
- Walsleben in 2015.

Personal information
- Full name: Philipp Walsleben
- Born: 19 November 1987 (age 38): Potsdam, East Germany; (now Germany)
- Height: 1.76 m (5 ft 9 in)
- Weight: 66 kg (146 lb)

Cycling career
- Sport: Cycling
- Current team: Retired
- Disciplines: Road; Cyclo-cross
- Role: Rider

Amateur team
- 2018: P&S Team Thüringen

Professional teams
- 2006: Team Notebooksbilliger.de
- 2007: Heinz Von Heiden–Focus
- 2008–2017: Palmans–Cras
- 2019–2021: Corendon–Circus

Philipp Walsleben (born 19 November 1987) is a German former racing cyclist, who rode professionally in cyclo-cross and road racing between 2006 and 2021 for the Team Notebooksbilliger.de, Heinz Von Heiden–Focus and Alpecin–Fenix teams. During his cyclo-cross career, Walsleben won the world under-23 title in 2009 and the German national title on six occasions.

== Major results ==
=== Cyclo-cross ===
2002–2003
2nd National Debutants Championships
2004–2005
1st National Junior Championships
2006–2007
1st National Under-23 Championships
2007–2008
1st Memorial Romano Scotti, UCI Under-23 World Cup
Under-23 Superprestige

1st Cyclo-cross Gavere
1st Superprestige Gieten

2nd UEC European Under-23 Championships
2008–2009
1st Under-23 race, UCI World Championships
1st UEC European Under-23 Championships
1st National Championships
1st Overall UCI Under-23 World Cup

1st Cyklokros Tábor
1st Veldrit Pijnacker
1st Grand Prix Eric De Vlaeminck
1st Cyclo-cross Grand Prix Lille Métropole

1st Overall Under-23 Superprestige

1st Cyclo-cross Ruddervoorde
1st Cyclo-cross Gavere
1st Bollekescross
1st Superprestige Diegem
1st Vlaamse Aardbeiencross
1st Cyclo-cross Vorselaar

1st Overall Under-23 Gazet van Antwerpen

1st Koppenbergcross
1st Grand Prix van Hasselt
1st Grand Prix Rouwmoer
1st Grand Prix Sven Nys
2nd Krawatencross

1st Frankfurter Rad-Cross
1st Stevens Cyclo-cross Cup
1st Cross im Park
2009–2010
1st National Championships
1st Internationaler Rad-Cross
2010–2011
1st National Championships
5th Elite race, UCI World Championships
8th Overall UCI World Cup
2011–2012
2nd National Championships
9th Elite race, UCI World Championships
2012–2013
1st National Championships
5th Elite race, UCI World Championships
2013–2014
1st National Championships
1st Süpercross Baden
1st Internationale Cyclo-Cross Rucphen
2nd Overall UCI World Cup

2nd Cyklokros Tábor
3rd Caubergcross
3rd Duinencross Koksijde
3rd Grand Prix Nommay

2014–2015
9th Elite race, UCI World Championships
2015–2016
1st National Championships
2016–2017
3rd National Championships
2017–2018
1st Cyklokros Slaný, Toi Toi Cup

=== Road ===
2006
1st Young rider classification Course de Solidarność et des Champions Olympiques
2008
1st Stage 3 Tour de la Province de Namur
2009
10th Overall Boucles de la Mayenne
2011
1st Stage 3 Mi-Août en Bretagne
2013
1st Overall Baltic Chain Tour

1st Stage 1

3rd Overall Tour Alsace

1st Points classification
1st Stage 3

2014
Tour Alsace

1st Combativity classification
1st Km 68 classification

2015
1st Combativity classification Tour of Belgium
2nd Circuit de Wallonie
7th Overall Tour Alsace
8th Grand Prix Pino Cerami
2016
1st Mountains classification Czech Cycling Tour
2017
1st Mountains classification Tour du Limousin
2018
1st Overall Bałtyk–Karkonosze Tour

1st Stage 3

2019
4th Paris–Chauny
2021
1st Stage 4 Arctic Race of Norway
2nd Overall Boucles de la Mayenne

1st Stage 1
