= 2012–13 UCI Cyclo-cross World Cup =

Bicycle racing competition

2012–2013 UCI Cyclo-cross World Cup
Details
- Dates: 21 October 2012 – 20 January 2013
- Location: Europe
- Races: 8

Champions
- Male individual champion: Niels Albert (Belgium)
- Female individual champion: Katie Compton (United States)

The 2012–2013 UCI Cyclo-cross World Cup events and season-long competition took place between 21 October 2012 and 20 January 2013, sponsored by the Union Cycliste Internationale (UCI). The events in Igorre and Liévin were dropped from the series, replaced by the return of Roubaix and the introduction of Rome.

== Events ==
Date	Venue	Country	Elite men's winner	Elite women's winner
21 October	Tábor	Czech Republic	Kevin Pauwels (BEL)	Sanne van Paassen (NED)
28 October	Plzeň	Czech Republic	Niels Albert (BEL)	Katie Compton (USA)
24 November	Koksijde	Belgium	Sven Nys (BEL)	Katie Compton (USA)
2 December	Roubaix	France	Sven Nys (BEL)	Katie Compton (USA)
23 December	Namur	Belgium	Kevin Pauwels (BEL)	Katie Compton (USA)
26 December	Heusden-Zolder	Belgium	Sven Nys (BEL)	Marianne Vos (NED)
6 January	Rome	Italy	Kevin Pauwels (BEL)	Marianne Vos (NED)
20 January	Hoogerheide	Netherlands	Martin Bína (CZE)	Marianne Vos (NED)

== Individual standings ==
=== Men ===
Rank	Name	Points
1	Niels Albert (BEL)	540
2	Kevin Pauwels (BEL)	515
3	Sven Nys (BEL)	506
4	Lars van der Haar (NED)	411
5	Bart Aernouts (BEL)	372
6	Radomír Šimůnek (CZE)	361
7	Klaas Vantornout (BEL)	356
8	Francis Mourey (FRA)	348
9	Thijs van Amerongen (NED)	318
10	Simon Zahner (SUI)	298

=== Women ===
Rank	Name	Points
1	Katie Compton (USA)	390
2	Sanne van Paassen (NED)	300
3	Nikki Harris (GBR)	276
4	Helen Wyman (GBR)	274
5	Sanne Cant (BEL)	247
6	Marianne Vos (NED)	225
7	Jasmin Achermann (SUI)	223
8	Christel Ferrier-Bruneau (FRA)	202
9	Lucie Chainel-Lefèvre (FRA)	196
10	Pavla Havliková (CZE)	165
