= 2010–11 UCI Cyclo-cross World Cup =

Bicycle racing competition

2010–2011 UCI Cyclo-cross World Cup
Details
- Dates: 17 October 2010 – 23 January 2011
- Location: Europe
- Races: 8

Champions
- Male individual champion: Niels Albert (Belgium)
- Female individual champion: Sanne van Paassen (Netherlands)

The 2010–2011 UCI Cyclo-cross World Cup events and season-long competition took place between 17 October 2010 and 23 January 2011, sponsored by the Union Cycliste Internationale (UCI).

== Events ==
Date	Venue	Elite men's winner	Elite women's winner	Website
17 October	(Switzerland) Aigle	Zdeněk Štybar (CZE)	Katie Compton (USA)	
24 October	(Czech Republic) Plzeň	Zdeněk Štybar (CZE)	Sanne van Paassen (NED)	
27 November	(Belgium) Koksijde	Niels Albert (BEL)	Katie Compton (USA)	
5 December	(Spain) Igorre	Niels Albert (BEL)	No women's race held	
19 December	(Belgium) Kalmthout	Tom Meeusen (BEL)	Katie Compton (USA)	
26 December	(Belgium) Heusden-Zolder	Lars Boom (NED)	Katie Compton (USA)	
16 January	(France) Pont-Château	Kevin Pauwels (BEL)	Marianne Vos (NED)	
23 January	(Netherlands) Hoogerheide	Niels Albert (BEL)	Katie Compton (USA)	
