= Helen Wyman =

British cyclist (born 1981)

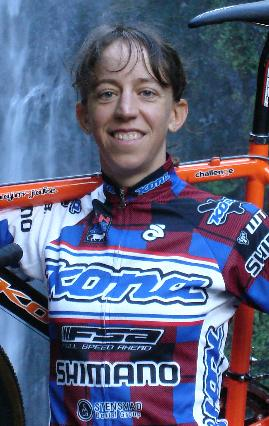

Personal information
- Born: 4 March 1981 (age 45) St Albans, Hertfordshire, England
- Height: 5 ft 9 in (175 cm)
- Weight: 123 lb (56 kg)

Cycling career
- Sport: Cycling
- Current team: Experza-Footlogix
- Disciplines: Road & Cyclo-cross
- Role: Rider
- Rider type: Cyclo-Cross

Professional teams
- 2006: Team Fat Birds
- 2007: Global Racing
- 2008: Swift Racing
- 2009: Kona/FSA Factory Team
- 2010–2017: Kona Factory Team
- 2018: Xypex – Verge Sport
- 2019–: Experza-Footlogix

Major wins
- Cyclo-cross European Championships (2012, 2013) National Championships (2006–2012, 2014, 2015, 2018)

Helen Wyman (born 4 March 1981) is a British cyclist for the Experza-Footlogix team. She participates in both road cycling and cyclo-cross, and, since she began competing at the age of 14, Wyman has represented her country at many international events including World Cups and World Championships. Except for 2013, she was the British national champion in cyclo-cross from 2006 to 2015. Having retired from professional raceling, she presently commentates numerous UCI cylocross races for TNT Sports.

== Major results ==
2003–2004
National Trophy Series

1st Leicester
2nd Cheltenham
3rd Monmouth

2004–2005
National Trophy Series

1st Leicester
2nd Ipswich
3rd Cheltenham
3rd Dudley

2nd Overijse
2nd Herford
3rd National Championships
2005–2006
1st National Championships
National Trophy Series

1st Cheltenham
1st Southampton
2nd Chorley

2006–2007
1st National Championships
National Trophy Series

1st Cheltenham

1st Verbania
2nd Overijse
UCI World Cup

3rd Kalmthout
3rd Hoogerheide

3rd Veghel-Eerde
2007–2008
1st National Championships
2nd Frankfurt
UCI World Cup

2nd Milan
3rd Hoogerheide

3rd Zeddam
2008–2009
1st National Championships
1st Schmerikon
1st Wädenswil
3rd Tervuren
2009–2010
1st National Championships
1st Döhlau
1st Fae' di Oderzo
1st Wetzikon
1st Redmond
2nd Strullendorf
3rd Overall Gazet van Antwerpen

2nd Koppenberg
3rd Namur

3rd UEC European Championships
2010–2011
1st National Championships
3rd Overall Gazet van Antwerpen

1st Koppenberg
3rd Oostmalle

Fidea Classics

1st Niel

National Trophy Series

1st Abergavenny

1st Fae' di Oderzo
1st Heerlen
2nd Gavere
2nd Zonhoven
2nd Wetzikon
3rd UEC European Championships
3rd Woerden
2011–2012
1st National Championships
1st Ruddervoorde
1st Baltimore I
1st Baltimore II
1st Gloucester I
1st Gloucester II
1st Breinigsville
1st Burlington
1st Rochester
Gazet van Antwerpen

2nd Koppenberg

2nd Surhuisterveen
2nd Woerden
3rd Gieten
2012–2013
1st UEC European Championships
2nd Overall Bpost Bank Trophy

1st Koppenberg
2nd Essen
3rd Oostmalle

1st Gieten
1st Baltimore I
1st Baltimore II
1st Gloucester I
1st Gloucester II
1st Iowa City I
1st Iowa City II
1st Iowa City III
1st Providence I
1st Providence II
1st Rochester I
1st Rochester II
1st Breinigsville
2nd National Championships
UCI World Cup

2nd Plzeň
3rd Tábor

2nd Middelkerke
2nd Surhuisterveen
2nd Heerlen
2nd Woerden
3rd Cauberg
2013–2014
1st UEC European Championships
1st National Championships
2nd Overall Bpost Bank Trophy

1st Koppenberg
2nd Hasselt
2nd Ronse
2nd Essen
3rd Loenhout
3rd Lille
3rd Oostmalle

1st Gieten
1st Middelkerke
1st Otegem
1st Ruddervoorde
1st Heerlen
1st Baltimore I
1st Baltimore II
1st Williston I
1st Williston II
UCI World Cup

2nd Nommay

2nd Gavere
2nd Gloucester II
3rd UCI World Championships
3rd Brabant
3rd Woerden
3rd Providence
2014–2015
1st National Championships
1st Baltimore I
1st Baltimore II
1st Brabant
1st Gloucester I
UCI World Cup

2nd Cauberg

Bpost Bank Trophy

2nd Ronse
3rd Hamme
3rd Lille

2nd Hoogstraten
2nd Middelkerke
2nd Otegem
2nd Ruddervoorde
2nd Spa-Francorchamps
2nd Providence II
Soudal Classics

3rd Niel

3rd Providence I
3rd Woerden
2015–2016
3rd Overall Bpost Bank Trophy

1st Hamme
2nd Antwerpen
3rd Baal

Superprestige

1st Spa-Francorchamps

1st Rucphen
2nd National Championships
2nd Surhuisterveen
2nd Overijse
2016–2017
1st Gloucester II
1st Iowa City
Superprestige

2nd Hoogstraten

2nd Baltimore I
2nd Gloucester I
3rd Baltimore II
3rd Breinigsville II
2017–2018
1st National Championships
DVV Trophy

1st Koppenberg
3rd Ronse
3rd Antwerpen

EKZ CrossTour

1st Aigle

1st Contern
1st Elorrioko
1st Manlleu
1st Woerden
UCI World Cup

2nd Bogense
2nd Zeven

Brico Cross

2nd Bredene

Superprestige

3rd Hoogstraten

Soudal Classics

3rd Neerpelt

2018–2019
1st Iowa City
1st Ametzaga Zuia
1st Abadino
2nd Leudelange
2nd Lutterbach
3rd Overall Copa de España

2nd Elorrio

EKZ CrossTour

3rd Aigle

Toi Toi Cup

3rd Mlada Boleslav

3rd National Championships
3rd Rucphen
