= Eva Lechner =

Italian cyclist (born 1985)

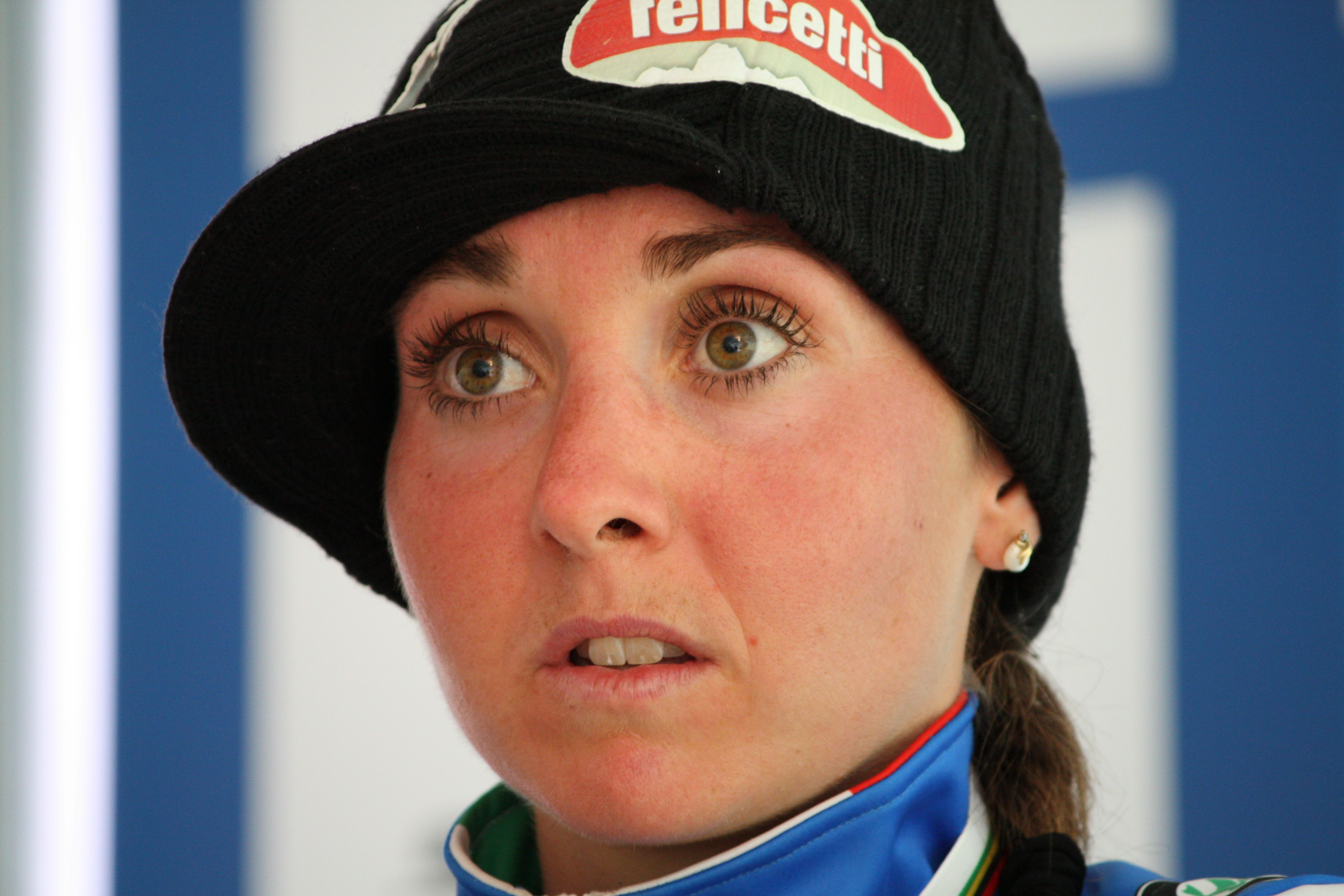
- Lechner in 2011

Personal information
- Full name: Eva Lechner
- Born: 1 July 1985 (age 41) Bolzano, Italy

Cycling career
- Sport: Cycling
- Current team: Trinx Factory Team
- Disciplines: Mountain bike Road; Cyclo-cross
- Role: Rider

Amateur teams
- 2007: Team Trentino Alto
- 2010–2012: Rapp. Südtirol Alto Adige (road)
- 2013: NWV Groningen–Bike4AIR (road)

Professional teams
- 2006: Fenixs–Colnago
- 2008–2015: Colnago–Cap–Arreghini (MTB)
- 2008–2009: Gauss RDZ Ormu (road)
- 2014: RusVelo Women's Team (road)
- 2015: BTC City Ljubljana (road)
- 2016–2018: Luna Pro Team (MTB)
- 2016: Servetto Footon (road)
- 2018–2020: Creafin–TÜV SÜD (cyclo-cross)
- 2020–: Trinx Factory Team (MTB)
- 2020–2021: Starcasino CX Team (cyclo-cross)

Major wins
- Cyclo-cross National Championships (2009, 2010, 2012–2018) World Cup 2 individual wins (2014–15, 2015–16) Mountain bike National XC Championships (2012, 2014, 2016) XC World Cup 3 individual wins (2010, 2013, 2014) Road National Road Race Championships (2007)
Medal record
Women's cyclo-cross
Representing Italy
World Championships
Silver medal – second place	2014 Hoogerheide	Elite race
European Championships
Silver medal – second place	2019 Silvelle	Elite race

Eva Lechner (born 1 July 1985) is an Italian multi-discipline cyclist, who has won at least one national title in cyclo-cross, road bicycle racing and mountain bike racing. She won the team relay at the 2012 Mountain bike World Championships together with Luca Braidot, Marco Aurelio Fontana and Beltain Schmid.

She finished in 17th place in the Women's cross-country at the 2012 Summer Olympics, and 16th in the same event at the 2008 Summer Olympics. She finished 8th in the of 2018 Cross-Country European Championships.

Lechner won the silver medal in the women's elite race at the 2014 UCI Cyclo-cross World Championships, coming second to Marianne Vos.

== Major results ==
=== Road ===
2007
1st Road race, National Road Championships
2011
9th Overall Giro del Trentino Alto Adige-Südtirol
2012
7th Overall Tour de Feminin
2015
9th Giro del Trentino Alto Adige-Südtirol

=== Cyclo-cross ===
2008–2009
1st National Championships
2nd Faè Di Oderzo
2009–2010
1st National Championships
1st Ornavasso
2010–2011
3rd National Championships
2011–2012
1st National Championships
2nd Rome
2nd Faè Di Oderzo
2012–2013
1st National Championships
1st Milano
2nd Faè Di Oderzo
2013–2014
1st National Championships
1st Faè Di Oderzo
2nd UCI World Championships
Superprestige

2nd Diegem

UCI World Cup

3rd Rome
3rd Nommay

2014–2015
1st National Championships
UCI World Cup

1st Hoogerheide

1st Overall EKZ CrossTour

1st Baden
1st Dielsdorf
3rd Eschenbach

Giro d'Italia Cross

1st Roma
1st Rossano Veneto
1st Faè Di Oderzo

2015–2016
1st National Championships
EKZ CrossTour

1st Baden
1st Meilen
2nd Eschenbach

1st Asolo
2nd Overall UCI World Cup

1st Cauberg
2nd Las Vegas
3rd Namur
3rd Lignières-en-Berry

2nd Roma
2nd Faè Di Oderzo
Superprestige

3rd Diegem

2016–2017
1st National Championships
EKZ CrossTour

1st Baden
1st Eschenbach

UCI World Cup

2nd Namur

3rd Iowa City
2017–2018
1st National Championships
EKZ CrossTour

1st Eschenbach

1st Madiswil
1st Faè Di Oderzo
1st Brugherio
1st Milano
National Trophy Series

2nd Abergavenny

3rd Overall UCI World Cup

2nd Hoogerheide
3rd Namur
3rd Heusden-Zolder

2018–2019
1st National Championships
Brico Cross

1st Geraardsbergen
3rd Bredene
3rd Essen

3rd Overijse
2019–2020
1st National Championships
2nd UEC European Championships
Superprestige

2nd Boom

2020–2021
3rd National Championships
Ethias Cross

3rd Beringen

EKZ CrossTour

3rd Hittnau

2021–2022
1st Jesolo
1st San Colombano
1st Faè Di Oderzo
2nd National Championships
2022–2023
2nd Vittorio Veneto
3rd Fae' Di Oderzo

=== Mountain bike ===
2002
2nd Cross-country, UEC European Junior Championships
2003
2nd Cross-country, UCI World Junior Championships
2005
1st Team relay, UEC European Championships
1st Cross-country, National Under-23 Championships
2nd Team relay, UCI World Championships
2006
2nd Team relay, UCI World Championships
3rd Cross-country, UEC European Under-23 Championships
2007
UEC European Championships

1st Under-23 cross-country
3rd Team relay

2008
UCI XCO World Cup

2nd Vallnord

2nd Team relay, UEC European Championships
3rd Team relay, UCI World Championships
2009
1st Team relay, UCI World Championships
National Championships

1st Cross-country
1st Marathon

Internazionali d'Italia Series

1st Nalles
2nd Montichiari

2010
National Championships

1st Cross-country
1st Marathon

Internazionali d'Italia Series

1st Nalles
2nd Montichiari

UEC European Championships

2nd Team relay
3rd Cross-country

3rd Overall UCI XCO World Cup

1st Houffalize
2nd Champéry

2011
1st Cross-country, National Championships
1st Vermiglio
UCI Eliminator World Cup

2nd Offenburg

2nd Lugagnano Val d'Arda
UCI World Championships

3rd Cross-country
3rd Team relay

UCI XCO World Cup

3rd Offenburg

3rd Team relay, UEC European Championships
3rd Zoetermeer
2012
1st Team relay, UCI World Championships
1st Team relay, UEC European Championships
1st Cross-country, National Championships
1st Nalles
1st Guiyang
1st Vermiglio
UCI Eliminator World Cup

2nd Houffalize

2013
1st Team relay, UCI World Championships
UEC European Championships

1st Team relay
2nd Cross-country
2nd Eliminator

Internazionali d'Italia Series

1st Nalles
1st Montichiari
1st Lugagnano Val d'Arda
2nd Chies d'Alpago
2nd Vermiglio

1st Jelenia Góra
2nd Overall UCI XCO World Cup

1st Albstadt
2nd Hafjell
3rd Vallnord

UCI Eliminator World Cup

2nd Hafjell

2nd Eliminator, National Championships
3rd Langkawi
2014
1st Cross-country, National Championships
UCI XCO World Cup

1st Cairns

1st Langkawi
Internazionali d'Italia Series

2nd Nalles

Swiss Bike Cup

2nd Solothurn

2015
1st Cross-country, National Championships
1st Rio de Janeiro
2nd Cross-country, UEC European Championships
Internazionali d'Italia Series

2nd Nalles

2nd Graz
3rd Team relay, UCI World Championships
Ötztaler Mountainbike Festival

3rd Haiming

2016
1st Cross-country, National Championships
US Cup

1st San Dimas

2017
Internazionali d'Italia Series

1st Courmayeur

US Cup

3rd Fontana

2018
1st Cross-country, National Championships
US Cup

3rd Fontana

2019
Internazionali d'Italia Series

1st San Marino
2nd Andora
3rd Pineto
3rd La Thuile

2nd Team relay, UEC European Championships
2nd Cross-country, National Championships
2020
1st Team relay, UEC European Championships
1st Cross-country, National Championships
1st Overall Transmaurienne Vanoise
1st Overall Andalucía Bike Race
UCI World Championships

2nd Cross-country
2nd Team relay

2021
National Championships

1st Cross-country
1st Eliminator
