= Caubergcross =

Cauberg Cyclo-cross
Race details
- Date: October
- Region: Valkenburg, Netherlands
- Discipline: Cyclo-cross
- Competition: UCI World Cup

History
- First edition: 2011
- Editions: 7 (as of 2016)
- First winner: Bart Wellens (BEL)
- Most wins: Lars van der Haar (NED) Marianne Vos (NED) (3 wins)
- Most recent: Mathieu van der Poel (NED) Thalita de Jong (NED)

The Cauberg Cyclo-cross is a cyclo-cross race held in Valkenburg, Netherlands. This race is up and around the famous Cauberg, which is the final of the Amstel Gold Race. Former World Champion Adrie van der Poel designed the parcours and its variations. Since the 2013-2014 season it became a part of the UCI Cyclo-cross World Cup. In October 2017 there was no edition held, because the Cyclo-cross World Championships is on the same parcours in February 2018 (shown in the results in red).

== Past Elite winners ==
=== Men ===
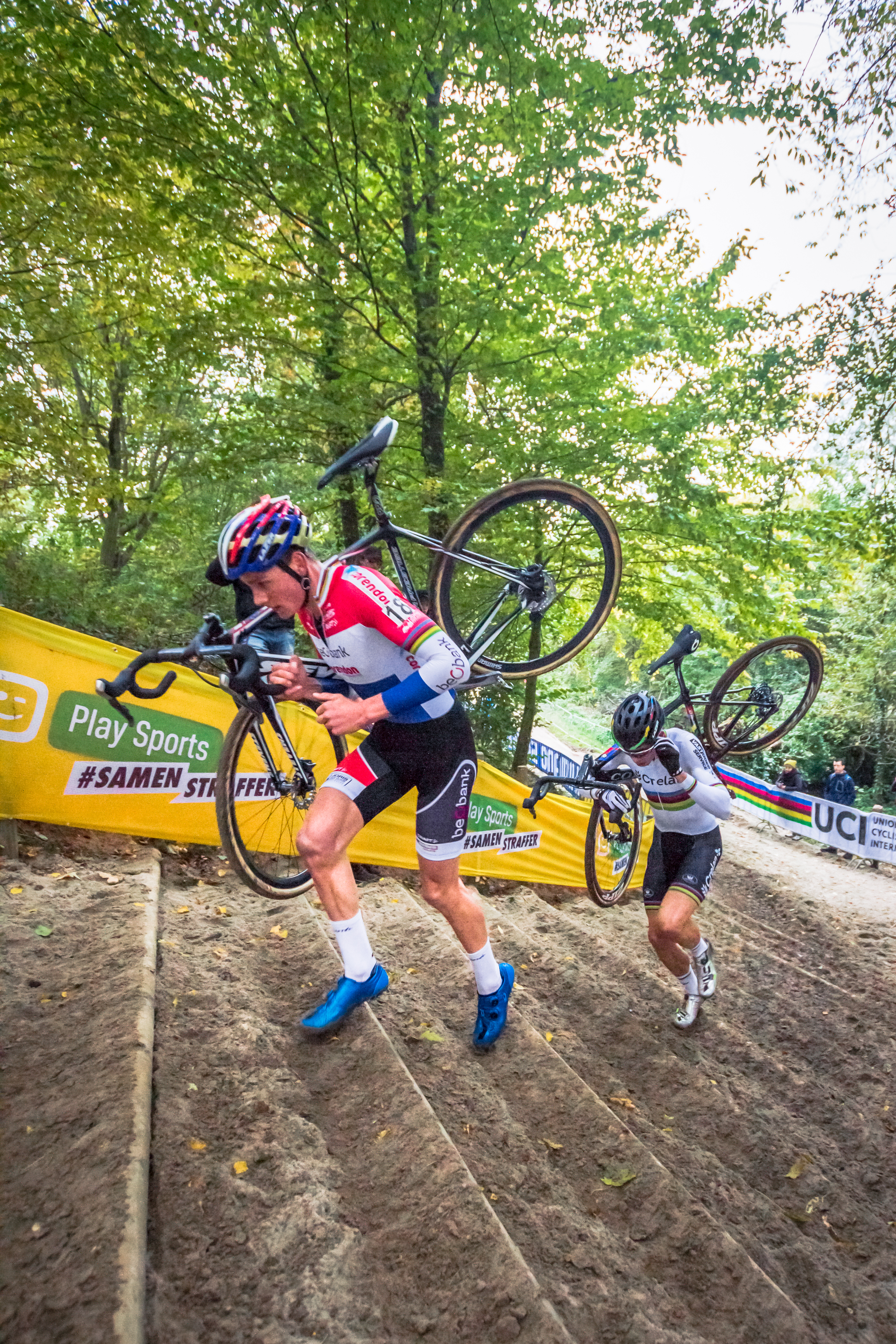
Mathieu van der Poel ahead of Wout van Aert in 2016

Date	Winner	Second	Third
2018-02-04	Wout van Aert (BEL)	Michael Vanthourenhout (BEL)	Mathieu van der Poel (NED)
2016-10-23	Mathieu van der Poel (NED)	Wout van Aert (BEL)	Michael Vanthourenhout (BEL)
2015-10-18	Lars van der Haar (NED)	Wout van Aert (BEL)	Sven Nys (BEL)
2014-10-19	Lars van der Haar (NED)	Kevin Pauwels (BEL)	Corné van Kessel (NED)
2013-10-20	Lars van der Haar (NED)	Kevin Pauwels (BEL)	Philipp Walsleben (GER)
2013-02-23	Martin Bína (CZE)	Radomír Šimůnek, Jr. (CZE)	Philipp Walsleben (GER)
2012-02-18	Sven Nys (BEL)	Klaas Vantornout (BEL)	Niels Albert (BEL)
2011-02-19	Bart Wellens (BEL)	Philipp Walsleben (GER)	Niels Albert (BEL)

=== Women ===
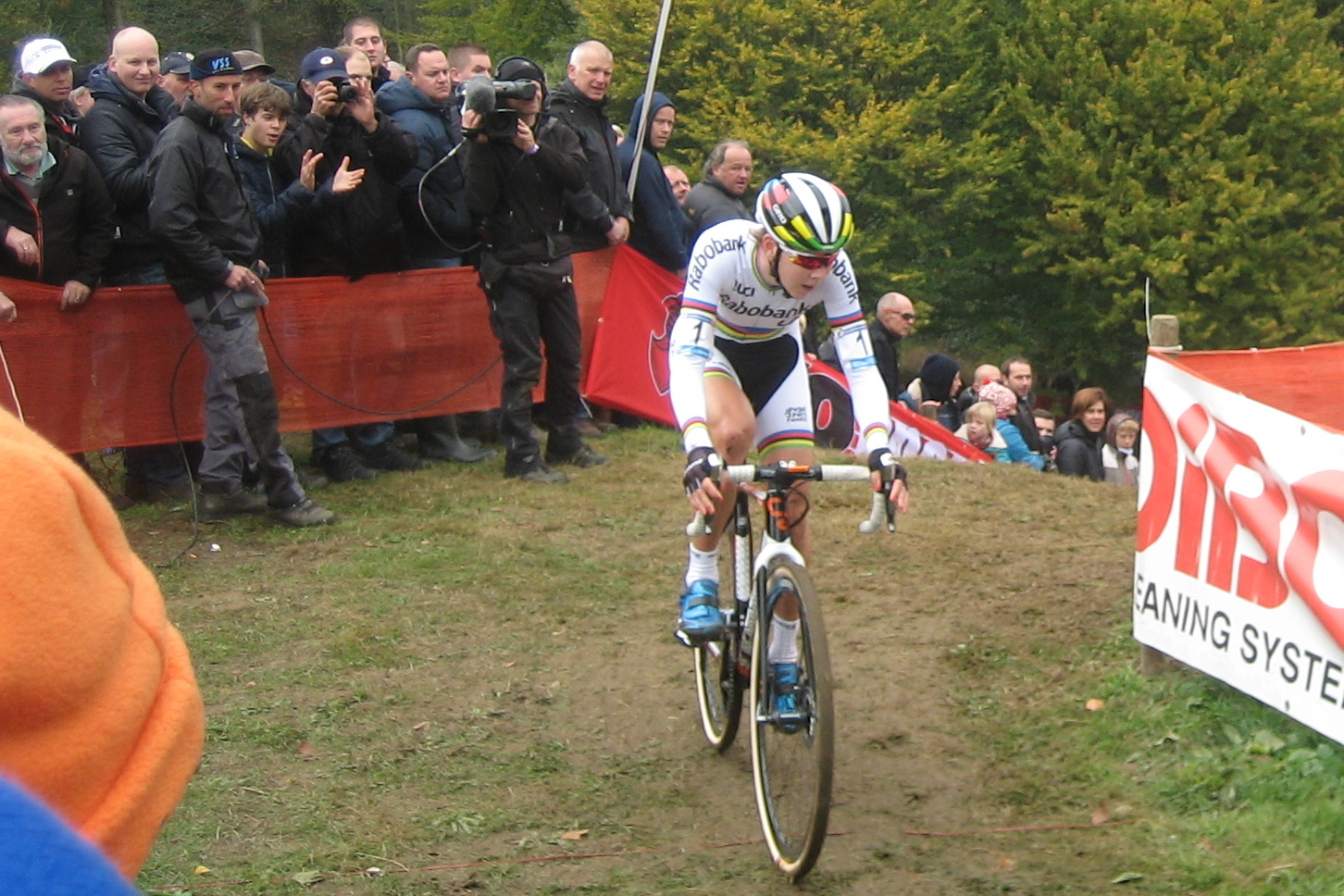
World Champion Thalita de Jong wins in 2016

Datum	Winner	Second	Third
2018-02-04	Sanne Cant (BEL)	Katherine Compton (USA)	Lucinda Brand (NED)
2016-10-23	Thalita de Jong (NED)	Sophie de Boer (NED)	Sanne Cant (BEL)
2015-10-18	Eva Lechner (ITA)	Kaitlin Antonneau (USA)	Pavla Havlíková (CZE)
2014-10-19	Katherine Compton (USA)	Helen Wyman (GBR)	Sophie de Boer (NED)
2013-10-20	Marianne Vos (NED)	Katherine Compton (USA)	Nikki Harris (GBR)
2013-02-23	Ellen Van Loy (BEL)	Sabrina Stultiens (NED)	Helen Wyman (GBR)
2012-02-18	Marianne Vos (NED)	Daphny van den Brand (NED)	Nikki Harris (GBR)
2011-02-19	Marianne Vos (NED)	Sanne van Paassen (NED)	Hanka Kupfernagel (GER)

== Past Under 23 / Junior winners ==
=== Men Under23 ===
Datum	Winner	Second	Third
2018-02-04	Eli Iserbyt (BEL)	Joris Nieuwenhuis (NED)	Yan Gras (FRA)
2016-10-23	Gioele Bertolini (ITA)	Joris Nieuwenhuis (NED)	Quinten Hermans (BEL)
2015-10-18	Gioele Bertolini (ITA)	Eli Iserbyt (BEL)	Clement Russo (FRA)
2014-10-19	Michael Vanthourenhout (BEL)	Wout van Aert (BEL)	Fabien Doubey (FRA)
2013-10-20	Michael Vanthourenhout (BEL)	Wout van Aert (BEL)	Mathieu van der Poel (NED)
2013-02-23			
2012-02-18	Lars van der Haar (NED)	Jens Adams (BEL)	Emiel Dolfsma (NED)

=== Men Junioren (U19) ===
Datum	Winner	Second	Third
2018-02-04	Ben Tulett (GBR)	Tomáš Kopecký (CZE)	Ryan Kamp (NED)
2016-10-23	Yentl Bekaert (BEL)	Antoine Benoist (FRA)	Andreas Goeman (BEL)
2015-10-18	Jappe Jaspers (BEL)	Jens Dekker (NED)	Seppe Rombouts (BEL)
2014-10-19	Eli Iserbyt (BEL)	Max Gulickx (NED)	Johan Jacobs (CHE)
2013-10-20	Lucas Dubau (FRA)	Joshua Dubau (FRA)	Yannick Peeters (BEL)
