= 2011 UCI Mountain Bike & Trials World Championships – Women's cross-country =

== Results - Elite ==
place	race nr	name	nat	birth	age	time
1	2	Catharine Pendrel	Canada	birth	age	time
2	1	Maja Włoszczowska	Poland	birth	age	time
3	?	Eva Lechner	Italy	birth	age	time

== Results - U23 ==
place	race nr	name	nat	birth	age	time
1	?	name	Switzerland	birth	age	time
2	?	name	Switzerland	birth	age	time
3	?	name	Switzerland	birth	age	time

== Results - Junior ==
place	race nr	name	nat	birth	age	time
1	?	name	Switzerland	birth	age	time
2	?	name	Switzerland	birth	age	time
3	?	name	Switzerland	birth	age	time

== See also ==
UCI Mountain Bike & Trials World Championships
