= Katie Compton =

American bicycle racer (born 1978)

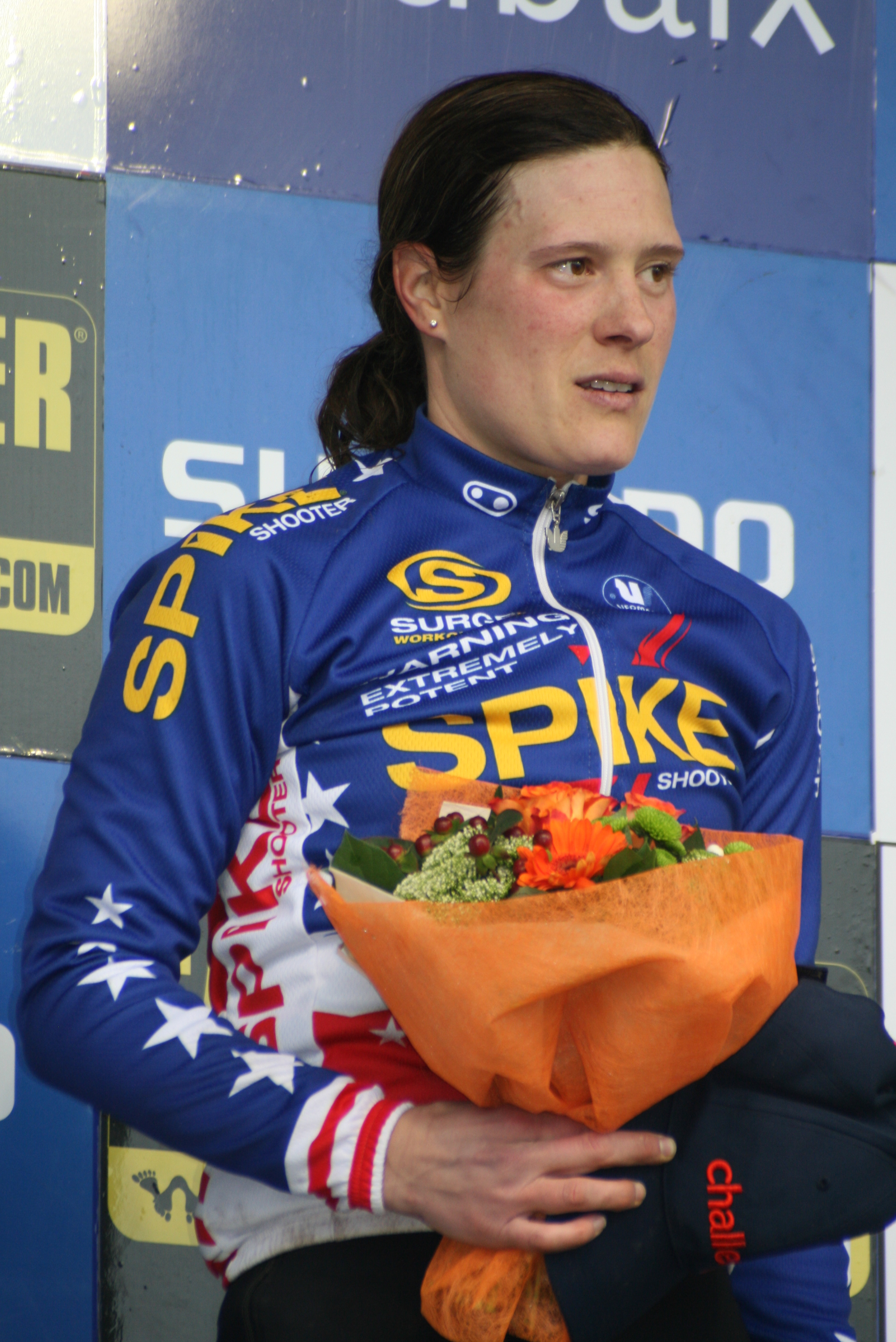
- Compton in 2011

Personal information
- Full name: Katie Compton
- Nickname: KFC
- Born: December 3, 1978 (age 47) Wilmington, United States
- Height: 5 ft 6 in (1.68 m)
- Weight: 135 lb (61 kg)

Cycling career
- Sport: Cycling
- Current team: KFC Racing presented by Trek Bikes, Knight Composites.
- Disciplines: Cyclo-cross, Track & MTB
- Role: Rider

Professional team
- 2006-2022: KFC Racing p/b Trek Bikes

Major wins
- 15x USA Cyclocross Champion
Medal record
Representing United States
Paralympic Games as pilot for Karissa Whitsell
Gold medal – first place	2004 Athens	road race/time trial
Gold medal – first place	2004 Athens	3 km individual pursuit
Silver medal – second place	2004 Athens	1 km time trial
Bronze medal – third place	2004 Athens	sprint
Women's Cyclo-cross
World Championships
Silver medal – second place	Hooglede-Gits 2007	Women elite race
Silver medal – second place	Sankt Wendel 2011	Women elite race
Silver medal – second place	Louisville 2013	Women elite race
Silver medal – second place	Valkenburg 2018	Women elite race
Bronze medal – third place	Hoogerheide 2009	Women elite race

Katie Compton (born December 3, 1978) is an American former bicycle racer. She specialized in cyclo-cross racing and is a 15-time national champion. Compton formerly piloted a tandem with a blind partner in Paralympic events.

She has won the USA Cycling Cyclocross National Championships Elite Women's title in an unbroken 15- win streak every season from 2004 to 2018. Since she took part in Paralympic events she can not enter any bicycle races which award UCI points. Since she was unable to take part in major races before the National Championship, her win was a surprise to other racers, fans and journalists, ending her Paralympic career under UCI regulations.

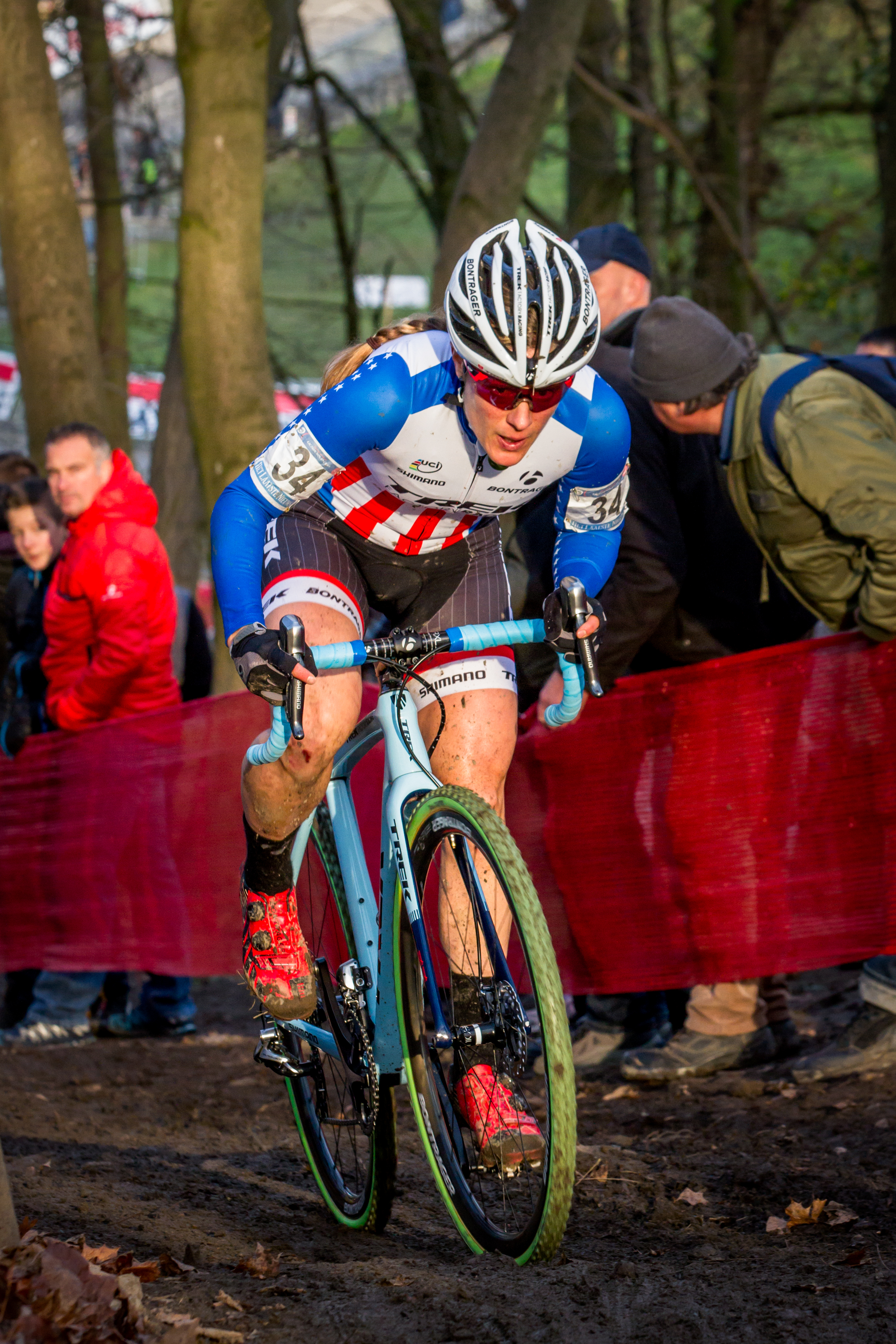
Katie Compton

In 2007, she became the first American woman to podium in the Cyclo-cross World Championships (held in the Cyclo-cross capital of the world that year—Belgium) where she won silver between a French duo composed of Maryline Salvetat (who took the gold) and Laurence Leboucher (who won the bronze). In the 2007–2008 season she began racing professionally in UCI races as she no longer had her Paralympic obligations. In the beginning of the season she routinely has won the elite women's races in the US and on November 11, in only her third ever, she won her first World Cup Race in Pijnacker, Netherlands. Compton won by a margin of 54 seconds ahead of race favorite Daphny van den Brand who had won the previous World Cup race in Kalmthout.

In Paralympic events she rides a tandem with a blind partner Karissa Whitsell. Compton, the sighted team member, pilots and pedals the tandem in the captain position while Whitsell rides in the rear, stoker, position on their tandem. They were dominant in the 2004 Games, winning medals in every event they entered and setting a world record in the 3 km pursuit event.

Compton has amassed twenty three World Cup wins and five medals at the Cyclocross World Championships, and 130+ UCI wins, making Compton the most successful US Cyclocross athlete male or female in the sport.

In 2012, Compton signed a contract with the Trek Cyclocross Collective. Compton has worked closely with Trek testing and developing geometry she designed for the successful Trek Crockett and Boone cyclocross models.

In 2014 Compton rides for the Trek Factory Racing Team.

In 2014 Compton won her 100th UCI race after winning the Valkenburg World Cup in The Netherlands.

In 2016 Trek removed Compton off Trek Factory Racing support. Compton went on to form her own team, "KFC Racing" with sponsors including Trek Bikes, Knight Composites and Panache Clothing. Compton resumed her winning ways for the 2016-17 cyclocross season winning her first race at the Trek CXC Cup in Waterloo, Wisconsin.

In 2018 Compton became the first non-European to win the DVV Trofee overall.

In 2018 Compton won the silver medal at the World Championships in Valkenburg, NL in a thrilling battle with Sanne Cant.

On August 11, 2021, it was announced that Compton had tested positive for an anabolic agent in September 2020 and had accepted a four-year ban as a consequence. The level was non-performance enhancing. Compton was notified five months after the test and was unable to trace the source of the contamination. As a bio-passport athlete, any level whether performance enhancing or not results in a positive test. Compton attempted to rescind her acceptance of the ban a week after accepting the ban due to poor legal advice but USADA refused to allow her to defend herself.

== Major results ==
2002
IPC World Championships

1st 3 km pursuit (with Karissa Whitsell)
1st 23 km time trial (with Karissa Whitsell)
2nd kilometer time trial (with Karissa Whitsell)

2003
IPC World Championships

1st kilometer time trial (with Karissa Whitsell)
1st 14 km time trial (with Karissa Whitsell)
2nd 3 km pursuit (with Karissa Whitsell)
2nd road race (with Karissa Whitsell)
3rd match sprints (with Karissa Whitsell)

IBSA World Championships

1st 3 km pursuit (with Karissa Whitsell)
1st match sprints (with Karissa Whitsell)
2nd kilometer time trial (with Karissa Whitsell)
2nd road race (with Karissa Whitsell)

US Paralympic National Championships

1st 3 km pursuit (with Karissa Whitsell)
1st kilometer time trial (with Karissa Whitsell)
1st match sprints (with Karissa Whitsell)

2004
1st National Cyclo-cross Championships
Paralympic Games, Athens, Greece (with Karissa Whitsell)

1st 3 km pursuit (with Karissa Whitsell)

(set current world record of 3:36.816)

1st combined road race and time trial (with Karissa Whitsell)
2nd kilometer time trial (with Karissa Whitsell)
3rd match sprints (with Karissa Whitsell)

2005
1st National Cyclo-cross Championships

2006
1st National Cyclo-cross Championships

2007
1st National Cyclo-cross Championships
UCI Cyclo-cross World Cup

1st Pijnacker
1st Koksijde
2nd Kalmthout

2nd UCI World Cyclo-cross Championships

2008
1st National Cyclo-cross Championships
1st National Mountain Bike Championships (Short track)
UCI Cyclo-cross World Cup

1st Koksijde
1st Nommay
3rd Pijnacker
4th Heusden-Zolder

2009
1st National Cyclo-cross Championships
UCI Cyclo-cross World Cup

1st Treviso
1st Nommay
3rd Kalmthout
3rd Heusden-Zolder
3rd Koksijde

3rd UCI World Cyclo-cross Championships

2010
1st National Cyclo-cross Championships
1st National Mountain Bike Championships (Short track)
UCI Cyclo-cross World Cup

1st Aigle
1st Koksijde
1st Kalmthout
1st Heusden-Zolder
1st Hoogerheide

2nd UCI World Cyclo-cross Championships

2011
UCI Cyclo-cross World Cup

1st Plzeň
3rd Koksijde
3rd Namur
3rd Lievin
4th Hoogerheide

5th UCI Cyclo-cross World Championships

2012
1st National Cyclo-cross Championships
1st National Track Championships (Madison)
UCI Cyclo-cross World Cup

1st Plzeň
1st Koksijde
1st Roubaix
1st Namur
2nd Tábor
2nd Heusden-Zolder

2nd UCI Cyclo-cross World Championships

2013
1st National Cyclo-cross Championships
UCI Cyclo-cross World Cup

1st Tábor
1st Koksijde
1st Namur
1st Zolder
2nd Valkenburg

2014
1st Pan American Continental Cyclo-cross Championships
1st National Cyclo-cross Championships
UCI Cyclo-cross World Cup

1st Baal
1st Rome
1st Valkenburg

2015
1st Pan American Continental Cyclo-cross Championships
1st National Cyclo-cross Championships
UCI Cyclo-cross World Cup

2nd Heusden-Zolder
4th Namur

2016
1st Pan American Continental Cyclo-cross Championships
1st National Cyclo-cross Championships
UCI Cyclo-cross World Cup

1st Jingle Cross
2nd Zeven
3rd CrossVegas

2017
1st Pan American Continental Cyclo-cross Championships
1st National Cyclo-cross Championships
1st Overall DVV Trophy

1st GP Mario De Clercq

1st Poldercross
UCI Cyclo-cross World Cup

5th Duinencross Koksijde

2018
1st National Cyclo-cross Championships
1st GP Sven Nys
UCI Cyclo-cross World Cup

1st Nommay

2nd UCI World Cyclo-cross Championships

2019
2nd : Hoogerheide
3rd : USA Cycling Cyclocross National Championships

2020
3rd : Grand Prix Nommay

Sporting positions
Preceded by Alison Dunlap	USA Cycling Cyclocross National Championships; 2004–2010, 2012–2014	Succeeded by Clara Honsinger
