= Cyclo-cross Grand Prix Lille Métropole =

Grand Prix Lille Métropole
Race details
- Region: Roubaix, France
- Discipline: Cyclo-cross
- Competition: UCI Cyclo-cross World Cup

History
- First edition: 2006
- Editions: 6 (as of 2012)
- First winner: Erwin Vervecken (BEL)
- Most wins: Erwin Vervecken (BEL) (3 wins)
- Most recent: Sven Nys (BEL)

The Cyclo-cross Grand Prix Lille Métropole is a cyclo-cross race held in Roubaix, France, as part of the UCI Cyclo-cross World Cup. It was first run in 2006 and became a World Cup event in the 2008−2009 and the 2009−2010 season.

After a hiatus Roubaix returned to the World Cup for the 2012−2013 season. It was also to have been a round of the 2014-2015 World Cup but the race had to be cancelled.

== Past winners ==
Year	Winner
2012	Sven Nys (BEL)
2010	Zdeněk Štybar (CZE)
2009	Erwin Vervecken (BEL)
2008	Erwin Vervecken (BEL)
2007	Gerben De Knegt (NED)
2006	Erwin Vervecken (BEL)
