= Duinencross Koksijde =

Cyclo-cross race in Koksijde, Belgium

- Poster to the 2024 edition

Race details
- Region: Koksijde, Belgium
- English name: Cyclo-cross of Dunes
- Discipline: Cyclo-cross
- Competition: UCI Cyclo-cross World Cup (1996–2021, 2025-); X²O Badkamers Trophy (2023–2025)
- Type: one-day

History (men)
- First edition: 1969
- Editions: 54 (as of 2025)
- First winner: Roger De Vlaeminck (BEL)
- Most wins: Sven Nys (BEL) (7 wins)
- Most recent: (Netherlands) Mathieu van der Poel

History (women)
- First edition: 2003
- Editions: 18 (as of 2025)
- First winner: Hanka Kupfernagel (GER)
- Most wins: Katie Compton (USA) (4 wins)
- Most recent: Lucinda Brand (NED)

The Duinencross Koksijde ("Cyclo-cross of Dunes") is a cyclo-cross race held in Koksijde, Belgium since 1969. In 2025 it returned to the UCI Cyclo-cross World Cup, having previously been that series from 1996-2021, forming part of the Cyclo-cross Trophy series in the gap.

== Past winners ==
Year	Men's winner	Women's winner
Dec 2025	(Netherlands) Mathieu van der Poel	(Netherlands) Lucinda Brand
Jan 2025	(Belgium) Laurens Sweeck	(Netherlands) Puck Pieterse
2024	(Netherlands) Mathieu van der Poel	(Netherlands) Fem van Empel
2023	(Belgium) Wout van Aert	(Netherlands) Shirin van Anrooij
2021	(Belgium) Eli Iserbyt	(Netherlands) Annemarie Worst
2020	Cancelled due to COVID-19 pandemic	
2019	(Netherlands) Mathieu van der Poel	(Netherlands) Ceylin del Carmen Alvarado
2018	(Netherlands) Mathieu van der Poel	(Netherlands) Denise Betsema
2017	(Netherlands) Mathieu van der Poel	(Netherlands) Maud Kaptheijns
2016	Cancelled due to strong winds	
2015	(Belgium) Sven Nys	(Belgium) Sanne Cant
2014	(Belgium) Wout van Aert	(Belgium) Sanne Cant
2013	(Belgium) Niels Albert	(United States) Katie Compton
2012	(Belgium) Sven Nys	(United States) Katie Compton
2011	(Belgium) Sven Nys	(Netherlands) Daphny van den Brand
2010	(Belgium) Niels Albert	(United States) Katie Compton
2009	(Czech Republic) Zdeněk Štybar	(Netherlands) Marianne Vos
2008	(Belgium) Erwin Vervecken	(United States) Katie Compton
2007	(Belgium) Sven Nys	(Netherlands) Daphny van den Brand
2006	(Belgium) Sven Nys	No race
2005	(Belgium) Sven Nys	No race
2004	(Belgium) Erwin Vervecken	No race
2003	(Belgium) Ben Berden	(Germany) Hanka Kupfernagel
2002	(Belgium) Ben Berden	No race until 2003
2001	(Netherlands) Richard Groenendaal	No race until 2003
2000	(Belgium) Erwin Vervecken	No race until 2003
1999	(Belgium) Sven Nys	No race until 2003
1998	(Belgium) Mario De Clercq	No race until 2003
1997	(Netherlands) Richard Groenendaal	No race until 2003
1996	(Netherlands) Adrie van der Poel	No race until 2003
1995	(Belgium) Erwin Vervecken	No race until 2003
1994	(Belgium) Paul Herygers	No race until 2003
1993	(Belgium) Erwin Vervecken	No race until 2003
1992	(Belgium) Danny De Bie	No race until 2003
1991	(Belgium) Danny De Bie	No race until 2003
1990	(Czechoslovakia) Radomir Simunek sr.	No race until 2003
1989	(Belgium) Danny De Bie	No race until 2003
1988	(Belgium) Danny De Bie	No race until 2003
1987	(Netherlands) Reinier Groenendaal	No race until 2003
1986	(Belgium) Roland Liboton	No race until 2003
1985	(Belgium) Roland Liboton	No race until 2003
1984	(Belgium) Yvan Messelis	No race until 2003
1983	(Belgium) Yvan Messelis	No race until 2003
1982	(Netherlands) Reinier Groenendaal	No race until 2003
1981	(Belgium) Johan Ghyllebert	No race until 2003
1980	(Belgium) Jan Teugels	No race until 2003
1979	(Belgium) Robert Vermeire	No race until 2003
1978	(Belgium) Robert Vermeire	No race until 2003
1977	No race	No race until 2003
1976	(Belgium) Norbert Dedeckere	No race until 2003
1975	(Belgium) Norbert Dedeckere	No race until 2003
1974	(Belgium) Eric Desruelle	No race until 2003
1973	(Belgium) Andre Geirlandt	No race until 2003
1972	(Belgium) Roger De Vlaeminck	No race until 2003
1971	(Belgium) Eric De Vlaeminck	No race until 2003
1970	(Belgium) Eric De Vlaeminck	No race until 2003
1969	(Belgium) Roger De Vlaeminck	No race until 2003
