= Grand Prix Eric De Vlaeminck =

- Poster to the 2025 edition

Race details
- Date: 26 December
- Region: Heusden-Zolder, Belgium
- Local name: Grote Prijs Eric De Vlaeminck (in Dutch)
- Discipline: Cyclo-cross
- Competition: UCI World Cup (until 2019); Superprestige

History
- First edition: 2000
- Editions: 19 (as of 2023)
- First winner: Sven Nys (BEL)
- Most wins: Mathieu van der Poel (NED) (5 wins)
- Most recent: Wout van Aert (BEL)

The Grand Prix Eric De Vlaeminck is a cyclo-cross race on and around the circuit Terlaemen in Heusden-Zolder, Belgium. The race is named after seven times world champion cyclo-cross Eric De Vlaeminck. Until 2019 it was part of the UCI Cyclo-cross World Cup but since 2020 it is part of the Superprestige. It is traditionally held on 26 December. In 2003 and 2004, it was a summercross.

== Winners ==
=== Men ===
| Year | Winner | Second | Third |
|---|---|---|---|
| 2023 | Wout van Aert (BEL) | Eli Iserbyt (BEL) | Joris Nieuwenhuis (NED) |
| 2022 | Wout van Aert (BEL) | Mathieu van der Poel (NED) | Lars van der Haar (NED) |
| 2021 | Wout van Aert (BEL) | Tom Pidcock (GBR) | Eli Iserbyt (BEL) |
| 2020 | Mathieu van der Poel (NED) | Wout van Aert (BEL) | Lars van der Haar (NED) |
| 2019 | Mathieu van der Poel (NED) | Laurens Sweeck (BEL) | Quinten Hermans (BEL) |
| 2018 | Mathieu van der Poel (NED) | Wout van Aert (BEL) | Joris Nieuwenhuis (NED) |
| 2017 | Mathieu van der Poel (NED) | Laurens Sweeck (BEL) | Wout van Aert (BEL) |
| 2016 | Wout van Aert (BEL) | Laurens Sweeck (BEL) | Kevin Pauwels (BEL) |
| 2015 | Mathieu van der Poel (NED) | Kevin Pauwels (BEL) | Lars van der Haar (NED) |
| 2014 | Lars van der Haar (NED) | Kevin Pauwels (BEL) | Corné van Kessel (NED) |
| 2013 | Lars van der Haar (NED) | Martin Bína (CZE) | Zdeněk Štybar (CZE) |
| 2012 | Sven Nys (BEL) | Niels Albert (BEL) | Zdeněk Štybar (CZE) |
| 2011 | Kevin Pauwels (BEL) | Zdeněk Štybar (CZE) | Sven Nys (BEL) |
| 2010 | Lars Boom (NED) | Niels Albert (BEL) | Bart Wellens (BEL) |
| 2009 | Kevin Pauwels (BEL) | Niels Albert (BEL) | Sven Nys (BEL) |
| 2008 | Thijs Al (NED) | Kevin Pauwels (BEL) | Sven Vanthourenhout (BEL) |
| 2004 | Sven Nys (BEL) | Ben Berden (BEL) | Wim Jacobs (BEL) |
| 2003 | Bart Wellens (BEL) | Ben Berden (BEL) | Mario De Clercq (BEL) |
| 2000 | Sven Nys (BEL) | Petr Dlask (CZE) | Bart Wellens (BEL) |

=== Women ===
This list is incomplete.

| Year | Winner | Second | Third |
|---|---|---|---|
| 2023 | Fem van Empel (NED) | Ceylin del Carmen Alvarado (NED) | Inge van der Heijden (NED) |
| 2022 | Ceylin del Carmen Alvarado (NED) | Inge van der Heijden (NED) | Lucinda Brand (NED) |
| 2021 | Lucinda Brand (NED) | Fem van Empel (NED) | Annemarie Worst (NED) |
| 2020 | Lucinda Brand (NED) | Ceylin del Carmen Alvarado (NED) | Annemarie Worst (NED) |
| 2019 | Lucinda Brand (NED) | Ceylin del Carmen Alvarado (NED) | Annemarie Worst (NED) |
| 2018 | Marianne Vos (NED) | Lucinda Brand (NED) | Sanne Cant (BEL) |
| 2017 | Sanne Cant (BEL) | Katie Compton (USA) | Eva Lechner (ITA) |
| 2016 | Marianne Vos (NED) | Sanne Cant (BEL) | Kateřina Nash (CZE) |
| 2015 | Sanne Cant (BEL) | Katie Compton (USA) | Ellen Van Loy (BEL) |
| 2014 | Marianne Vos (NED) | Kateřina Nash (CZE) | Pauline Ferrand-Prévot (FRA) |
| 2013 | Katie Compton (USA) | Marianne Vos (NED) | Sanne Cant (BEL) |
| 2012 | Marianne Vos (NED) | Katie Compton (USA) | Sanne Cant (BEL) |
| 2011 | Marianne Vos (NED) | Daphny van den Brand (NED) | Sanne van Paassen (NED) |
| 2010 | Katie Compton (USA) | Marianne Vos (NED) | Sanne van Paassen (NED) |
| 2009 | Marianne Vos (NED) | Katie Compton (USA) | Daphny van den Brand (NED) |
| 2008 | Marianne Vos (NED) | Hanka Kupfernagel (DEU) | Daphny van den Brand (NED) |
