= Cyklokros Tábor =

Cyclo-cross race in Tábor, Czech Republic

Race details
- Region: Tábor, Czech Republic
- English name: Cyclo-cross Tábor
- Discipline: Cyclo-cross
- Competition: UCI World Cup

History
- First edition: 1996
- Editions: 25 (as of 2025)
- First winner: Paul Herijgers (BEL)
- Most recent: Thibau Nys (BEL)

The Cyklokros Tábor is a cyclo-cross race held in Tábor, Czech Republic, which is part of the UCI Cyclo-cross World Cup.

== Past winners ==
=== Men ===
Year	Country	Rider	Team
1996	Belgium	Paul Herijgers	Tönissteiner–Saxon
1997	Belgium	Mario De Clercq	Palmans–Lystex
1998	Belgium	Sven Nys	Rabobank
1999	Belgium	Mario De Clercq	Palmans–Ideal
2000	Belgium	Bart Wellens	Spaarselect
2001	Belgium	Sven Nys	Rabobank
2002	Belgium	Bart Wellens	Spaarselect
2003	No race		
2004	Czech Republic	Kamil Ausbuher	Budvar-Tabor
2005	Belgium	Sven Nys	Rabobank
2006	Czech Republic	Radomir Simunek jr.	Palmans–Collstrop
2007	Belgium	Sven Nys	Rabobank
2008	Belgium	Niels Albert	Palmans–Cras
2009	No race		
2010	Czech Republic	Radomir Simunek jr.	BKCP–Powerplus
2011	Belgium	Kevin Pauwels	Sunweb-Revor
2012	Belgium	Kevin Pauwels	Sunweb-Revor
2013	Netherlands	Lars van der Haar	Rabobank Development Team
2014	No race		
2015	Netherlands	David van der Poel	BKCP–Powerplus
2016	Czech Republic	Michael Boroš	ERA Real Estate–Circus
2017	Netherlands	Mathieu van der Poel	Beobank–Corendon
2018	Netherlands	Mathieu van der Poel	Corendon–Circus
2019	Netherlands	Mathieu van der Poel	Corendon–Circus
2020	Belgium	Michael Vanthourenhout	Pauwels Sauzen–Bingoal
2021	Netherlands	Lars van der Haar	Baloise–Trek Lions
2022	Belgium	Eli Iserbyt	Pauwels Sauzen–Bingoal
2025	Belgium	Thibau Nys	Baloise Glowi Lions

=== Women ===
Year	Country	Rider	Team
2011	Czech Republic	Kateřina Nash	
2012	Netherlands	Sanne van Paassen	
2013	United States	Katie Compton	
2014	No race		
2015	Czech Republic	Pavla Havlíková	
2016	Czech Republic	Karla Štěpánová	
2017	No race		
2018	Netherlands	Lucinda Brand	
2019	Netherlands	Annemarie Worst	
2020	Netherlands	Lucinda Brand	
2021	Netherlands	Lucinda Brand	
2022	Netherlands	Fem Van Empel	
2025	Netherlands	Lucinda Brand	Baloise Glowi Lions
