= Grand Prix Adrie van der Poel =

Race details
- Date: January/February
- Region: Hoogerheide, Netherlands
- Discipline: Cyclo-cross
- Competition: UCI Cyclo-cross World Cup
- Type: one-day

History (men)
- First edition: February 20, 2000
- Editions: 22 + 3 World Championships (as of 2025)
- First winner: Richard Groenendaal (NED)
- Most wins: Mathieu van der Poel (NED); (7 wins + 1 World Championship)
- Most recent: Mathieu van der Poel (NED)

History (women)
- First edition: 2002
- Editions: 20 + 3 World Championships (as of 2025)
- First winner: Daphny van den Brand (NED)
- Most wins: Marianne Vos (NED); (5 wins + 2 World Championships)
- Most recent: Lucinda Brand (NED)

The Grand Prix Adrie van der Poel is a cyclo-cross race held in Hoogerheide, Netherlands, which is part of the UCI Cyclo-cross World Cup and normally the final World Cup race. The race is named after former cyclo-cross world champion Adrie van der Poel.

The first edition was held at the end of the cyclocross season of 1999-2000, when Adrie van der Poel retired from professional cyclocross racing. This was his last race, organised to honour him in his home village. The race was such a success, that it became a yearly venue. In 2003 the race became part of the UCI World Cup.

Van der Poel himself spotted the site in 1999 during a walk along the Scheldeweg. With a meadow, small woodland, lower fields and the steep incline of the Brabantse Wal (wall of Brabant), it was a great spot for a cyclo-cross with the capacity to host a large crowd. Adrie van der Poel designed the first parcours and still tweeks it to improve it every year.

== Past winners ==
Year	Men's winner	Women's winner
2025	(Netherlands) Mathieu van der Poel	(Netherlands) Lucinda Brand
2024	(Netherlands) Mathieu van der Poel	(Netherlands) Fem van Empel
2023	Race not held (World Championship at Hoogerheide)	
2022	(Belgium) Eli Iserbyt	(Netherlands) Marianne Vos
2021	Cancelled due to COVID-19 pandemic	
2020	(Netherlands) Mathieu van der Poel	(Netherlands) Lucinda Brand
2019	(Netherlands) Mathieu van der Poel	(Netherlands) Lucinda Brand
2018	(Netherlands) Mathieu van der Poel	(Belgium) Sanne Cant
2017	(Netherlands) Lars van der Haar	(Netherlands) Marianne Vos
2016	(Netherlands) Mathieu van der Poel	(Netherlands) Sophie De Boer
2015	(Netherlands) Mathieu van der Poel	(Italy) Eva Lechner
2014	Race not held (World Championship at Hoogerheide)	
2013	(Czech Republic) Martin Bína	(Netherlands) Marianne Vos
2012	(Belgium) Kevin Pauwels	(Netherlands) Marianne Vos
2011	(Belgium) Niels Albert	(United States) Katie Compton
2010	(Belgium) Niels Albert	(Netherlands) Marianne Vos
2009	Race not held (World Championship at Hoogerheide)	
2008	(Netherlands) Lars Boom	(Germany) Hanka Kupfernagel
2007	(Belgium) Sven Nys	(Germany) Hanka Kupfernagel
2006	(Belgium) Erwin Vervecken	(Netherlands) Daphny van den Brand
2005	(Belgium) Sven Nys	(Netherlands) Mirjam Melchers
2004	(Belgium) Mario De Clercq	(Netherlands) Reza Hormes-Ravenstijn
2003	(Belgium) Sven Nys	(Netherlands) Daphny van den Brand
2002	(Belgium) Erwin Vervecken	(Netherlands) Daphny van den Brand
2001	(Netherlands) Richard Groenendaal	not held
2000	(Netherlands) Richard Groenendaal	not held
