= Sanne van Paassen =

Dutch cyclist (born 1988)

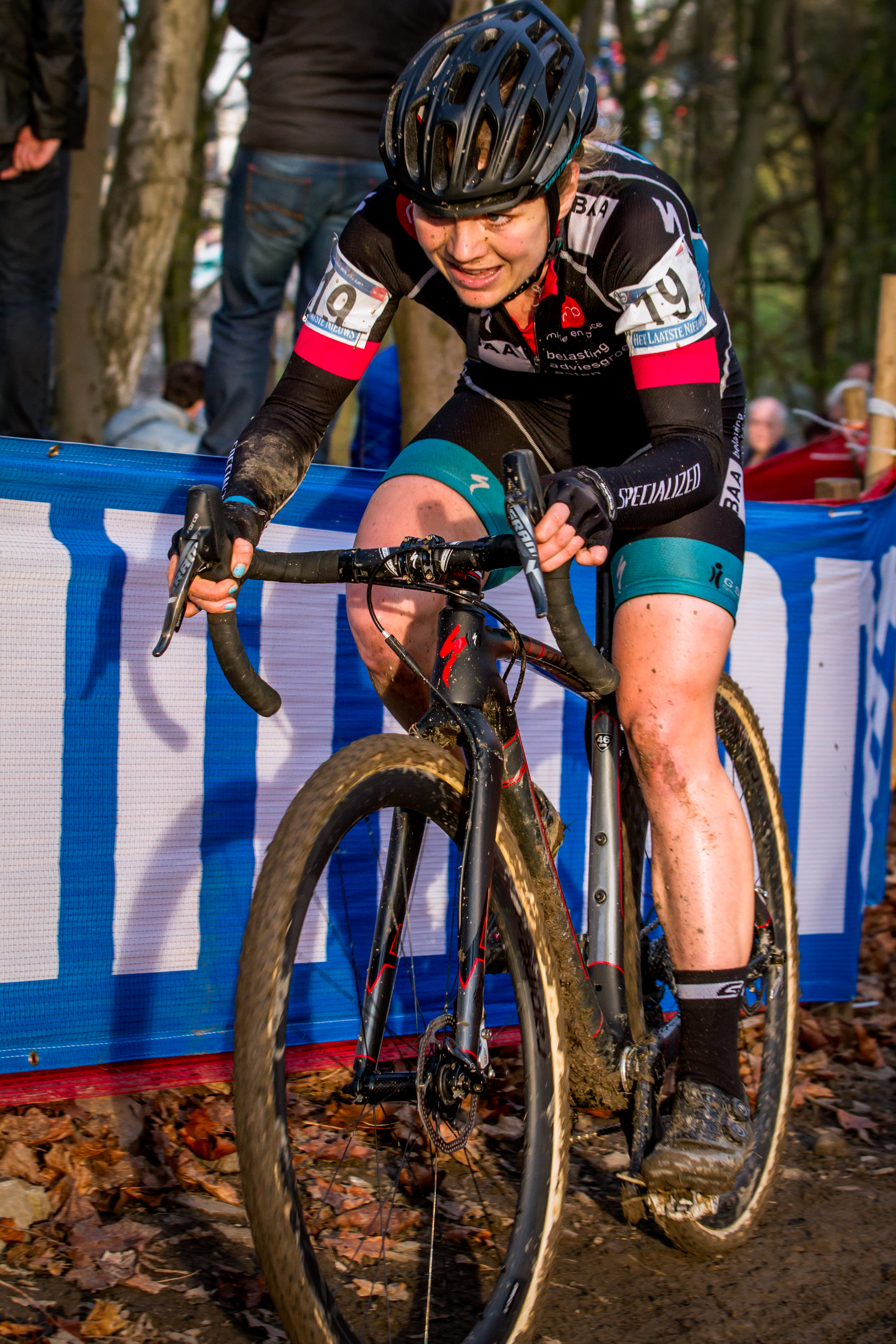
- Sanne van Paassen in 2015

Personal information
- Born: 27 October 1988 (age 37) Vlierden, Netherlands

Cycling career
- Sport: Cycling
- Discipline: Cyclo-cross
- Role: Rider

Professional teams
- 2008: DSB Bank Ladies Cycling-Team
- 2009-2011: Brainwash
- 2012-2014: Rabobank-Liv Woman Cycling Team
- 2014-2015: Boels–Dolmans
- 2015-2016: Bioteaful (her own team)

Sanne van Paassen (born 27 October 1988) is a Dutch former professional cyclo-cross racing cyclist. In 2011, she won the UCI Cyclo-cross World Cup, after winning the Cyklokros Plzeň. She won several silver and bronze medals at the national and European cyclo-cross championships. She won 19 cyclo-cross races in her career.

On the road she became second behind Kirsten Wild in the 2013 Gent–Wevelgem. She rode her last cross in Oostmalle on 21 February 2016.

== See also ==
- 2012 Rabobank Women Cycling Team season
- 2014 Rabo–Liv Women Cycling Team season
- 2014 Boels Dolmans Cycling Team season
- 2015 Boels Dolmans Cycling Team season
