= 2017–18 UCI Cyclo-cross World Cup =

Bicycle racing competition

Details
- Location: United States; Belgium; Denmark; Germany; France; Netherlands
- Races: 9

Champions
- Male individual champion: Mathieu van der Poel (NED) (Beobank–Corendon & Corendon–Circus (Note: In the 2017 races, van der Poel rode for Beobank–Corendon, and for Corendon–Circus in the 2018 races.))
- Female individual champion: Sanne Cant (BEL) (IKO–Beobank)

The 2017–18 Telenet UCI Cyclo-cross World Cup was a season long cyclo-cross competition, organised by the Union Cycliste Internationale (UCI). The UCI Cyclo-cross World Cup took place between 17 September 2017 and 28 January 2018, over a total of nine events. The defending champions were Wout van Aert in the men's competition and Sophie de Boer in the women's competition.

Both elite titles were won at the penultimate round of the season at Nommay. Despite finishing twelfth in the race, Sanne Cant won the women's title after her closest rival Kaitlin Keough finished the Nommay race in second behind compatriot Katie Compton. Cant was the only female rider to win more than once, winning five times during the season. Other races were won by Kateřina Nash, Maud Kaptheijns and Evie Richards, who became the first under-23 woman to win an elite race, when she won at Namur.

In the men's competition, Mathieu van der Poel won each of the first four races to build up a lead on van Aert and the rest. Van Aert won the next two races in Germany and at Namur, but with wins at Heusden-Zolder and Nommay, van der Poel gathered an unassailable lead going into the final round at Hoogerheide; he won that race as well, garnering podium finishes at all nine events during the campaign.

The men's under-23 title was won by Tom Pidcock, having won four World Cup races in as many starts, giving him an unassailable lead after the Grand Prix Erik De Vlaeminck at Circuit Zolder, as a rider's best four scores (from seven races) counted towards the classification. The women's under-23 title was won by Fleur Nagengast, while the junior men's title went to Tomáš Kopecký.

== Points distribution ==
Points were awarded to all eligible riders each race. The top ten finishers received points according to the following table:

Points awarded
| Position | 1 | 2 | 3 | 4 | 5 | 6 | 7 | 8 | 9 | 10 |
| Elite riders (Note: Women's under-23 riders were awarded points on the elite scale, as all women competed within the same race. Two jerseys were awarded; one for the leading elite woman and one for the leading under-23 woman.) | 80 | 70 | 65 | 60 | 55 | 50 | 48 | 46 | 44 | 42 |
| U23/Junior riders | 60 | 50 | 45 | 40 | 35 | 30 | 28 | 26 | 24 | 22 |

- Elite riders finishing in positions 11 to 50 also received points, going down from 40 points for 11th place by one point per place to 1 point for 50th place.
- For the age group riders (excluding under-23 women), those finishing in positions 11 to 30 also received points, going down from 20 points for 11th place by one point per place to 1 point for 30th place. As well as this, only the top four scores for each rider count towards the World Cup standings.

== Events ==
In comparison to last season, the races in Las Vegas, Rome (Fiuggi) and Valkenburg were replaced by Bogense, Nommay and Waterloo. The race in Bogense marked the first ever Cyclo-cross World Cup in Denmark, as a precursor to the 2019 UCI Cyclo-cross World Championships being held there.

| Date | Race | Location | Winners | | | |
| Date | Race | Location | Elite men | Elite women | Under-23 men | Junior men |
|---|---|---|---|---|---|---|
| 17 September | Jingle Cross | Iowa City, United States | Mathieu van der Poel (NED) | Kateřina Nash (CZE) | No under-23 or junior race | |
| 24 September | World Cup Waterloo | Waterloo, United States | Mathieu van der Poel (NED) | Sanne Cant (BEL) | No under-23 or junior race | |
| 2 October | Duinencross | Koksijde, Belgium | Mathieu van der Poel (NED) | Maud Kaptheijns (NED) | Tom Pidcock (GBR) | Pim Ronhaar (NED) |
| 19 November | CrossDenmark | Bogense, Denmark | Mathieu van der Poel (NED) | Sanne Cant (BEL) | Tom Pidcock (GBR) | Tomáš Kopecký (CZE) |
| 25 November | Poldercross Zeven | Zeven, Germany | Wout van Aert (BEL) | Sanne Cant (BEL) | Eli Iserbyt (BEL) | Pim Ronhaar (NED) |
| 17 December | Citadelcross | Namur, Belgium | Wout van Aert (BEL) | Evie Richards (GBR) | Tom Pidcock (GBR) | Loris Rouiller (SUI) |
| 26 December | Grand Prix Erik De Vlaeminck | Heusden-Zolder, Belgium | Mathieu van der Poel (NED) | Sanne Cant (BEL) | Tom Pidcock (GBR) | Tomáš Kopecký (CZE) |
| 21 January | Grand Prix Nommay | Nommay, France | Mathieu van der Poel (NED) | Katie Compton (USA) | Thijs Aerts (BEL) | Mees Hendrikx (NED) |
| 28 January | Grand Prix Adri van der Poel | Hoogerheide, Netherlands | Mathieu van der Poel (NED) | Sanne Cant (BEL) | Eli Iserbyt (BEL) | Niels Vandeputte (BEL) |

== Final points standings ==
=== Elite men ===
| Pos. | Rider | JIN (United States) | WAT (United States) | KOK (Belgium) | BOG (Denmark) | ZEV (Germany) | NAM (Belgium) | ZOL (Belgium) | NOM (France) | HOO (Netherlands) | Points |
|---|---|---|---|---|---|---|---|---|---|---|---|
| 1 | Mathieu van der Poel (NED) | 1 | 1 | 1 | 1 | 2 | 3 | 1 | 1 | 1 | 695 |
| 2 | Wout van Aert (BEL) | 14 | 7 | 3 | 2 | 1 | 1 | 3 | 2 | 2 | 585 |
| 3 | Toon Aerts (BEL) | 7 | 8 | 11 | 3 | 3 | 2 | 8 | 3 | 7 | 493 |
| 4 | Michael Vanthourenhout (BEL) | 6 | 4 | 8 | 9 | 5 | 5 | 9 | 5 | 3 | 474 |
| 5 | Laurens Sweeck (BEL) | 2 | 21 | 4 | 7 | 19 | 8 | 2 | 6 | 4 | 466 |
| 6 | Kevin Pauwels (BEL) | 4 | 6 | 12 | 10 | 6 | 4 | 12 | 10 | 5 | 437 |
| 7 | Corné van Kessel (NED) | 12 | 2 | 14 | 6 | 4 | 6 | 6 | 18 | 12 | 428 |
| 8 | Tim Merlier (BEL) | 17 | 5 | 22 | 5 | 13 | 12 | 7 | 4 | 6 | 408 |
| 9 | Lars van der Haar (NED) | 5 | 17 | 2 | 4 | 11 | 19 | 4 | Ret | 9 | 395 |
| 10 | Daan Soete (BEL) | 11 | 3 | 6 | 20 | 17 | 9 | 5 | 13 | 13 | 395 |
120 riders scored points

=== Elite women ===
| Pos. | Rider | JIN (United States) | WAT (United States) | KOK (Belgium) | BOG (Denmark) | ZEV (Germany) | NAM (Belgium) | ZOL (Belgium) | NOM (France) | HOO (Netherlands) | Points |
|---|---|---|---|---|---|---|---|---|---|---|---|
| 1 | Sanne Cant (BEL) | 3 | 1 | 3 | 1 | 1 | 12 | 1 | 12 | 1 | 608 |
| 2 | Kaitlin Keough (USA) | 2 | 2 | 8 | 3 | 11 | 6 | 16 | 2 | 5 | 501 |
| 3 | Eva Lechner (ITA) | 10 | 13 | 11 | 4 | 7 | 3 | 3 | 7 | 2 | 476 |
| 4 | Nikki Brammeier (GBR) | 9 | 19 | 9 | 10 | 8 | 2 | 11 | 14 | 8 | 401 |
| 5 | Katie Compton (USA) | 19 | 42 | 5 | DNS | 3 | 4 | 2 | 1 | 22 | 400 |
| 6 | Kateřina Nash (CZE) | 1 | 6 | | 6 | 4 | 7 | 14 | 11 | 20 | 396 |
| 7 | Helen Wyman (GBR) | 16 | 25 | 7 | 2 | 2 | 15 | 27 | 4 | 27 | 393 |
| 8 | Ellen Van Loy (BEL) | 12 | 7 | 12 | 5 | 23 | 11 | 8 | 9 | 15 | 375 |
| 9 | Maud Kaptheijns (NED) | 5 | 10 | 1 | | 28 | 18 | 9 | 19 | 10 | 351 |
| 10 | Sophie de Boer (NED) | 4 | 4 | 2 | 11 | 5 | 13 | 37 | | | 337 |
123 total riders (Note: This tally included 43 under-23 riders, which the UCI awarded a separate jersey for.) scored points

=== Under-23 men ===
| Pos. | Rider | KOK (Belgium) | BOG (Denmark) | ZEV (Germany) | NAM (Belgium) | ZOL (Belgium) | NOM (France) | HOO (Netherlands) | Points |
|---|---|---|---|---|---|---|---|---|---|
| 1 | Tom Pidcock (GBR) | 1 | 1 | | 1 | 1 | | (2) | 240 |
| 2 | Eli Iserbyt (BEL) | (3) | (2) | 1 | 2 | 2 | | 1 | 220 |
| 3 | Thijs Aerts (BEL) | 4 | (8) | 2 | (10) | 5 | 1 | (7) | 185 |
| 4 | Adam Ťoupalík (CZE) | 2 | 5 | 8 | (9) | 4 | | (21) | 151 |
| 5 | Yannick Peeters (BEL) | (7) | 7 | 4 | (28) | (18) | 4 | 5 | 143 |
| 6 | Sieben Wouters (NED) | 8 | 3 | (Ret) | 4 | 6 | (16) | (11) | 141 |
| 7 | Toon Vandebosch (BEL) | 6 | 4 | 6 | (19) | (11) | (14) | 4 | 140 |
| 8 | Joris Nieuwenhuis (NED) | 11 | (16) | (Ret) | (Ret) | 3 | 7 | 3 | 138 |
| 9 | Joshua Dubau (FRA) | (28) | (10) | 5 | 6 | 9 | 3 | (18) | 134 |
| 10 | Jakob Dorigoni (ITA) | | (22) | (Ret) | 5 | 7 | 12 | 8 | 108 |
72 riders scored points

=== Under-23 women ===
| Pos. | Rider | JIN (United States) | WAT (United States) | KOK (Belgium) | BOG (Denmark) | ZEV (Germany) | NAM (Belgium) | ZOL (Belgium) | NOM (France) | HOO (Netherlands) | Points |
|---|---|---|---|---|---|---|---|---|---|---|---|
| 1 | Fleur Nagengast (NED) | 24 | 18 | 18 | 16 | 20 | 28 | 23 | 16 | 28 | 268 |
| 2 | Ceylin del Carmen Alvarado (NED) | | | 20 | 14 | 14 | 27 | 15 | 17 | 9 | 243 |
| 3 | Laura Verdonschot (BEL) | | | 15 | 9 | 10 | | 7 | Ret | | 170 |
| 4 | Emma White (USA) | 11 | 8 | | | | 21 | 18 | | 31 | 169 |
| 5 | Inge van der Heijden (NED) | | | 34 | 30 | Ret | 23 | 22 | 26 | 12 | 159 |
| 6 | Evie Richards (GBR) | | | | | | 1 | | | 3 | 145 |
| 7 | Nadja Heigl (AUT) | | | 36 | 32 | 37 | 20 | 30 | 31 | 40 | 131 |
| 8 | Marion Norbert-Riberolle (FRA) | | | 33 | 24 | 34 | 36 | 41 | 20 | 46 | 123 |
| 9 | Nikola Nosková (CZE) | | | 22 | 22 | 21 | 38 | | | | 101 |
| 10 | Manon Bakker (NED) | | | | 41 | 32 | | 45 | 21 | 29 | 87 |
43 riders scored points

=== Junior men ===
| Pos. | Rider | KOK (Belgium) | BOG (Denmark) | ZEV (Germany) | NAM (Belgium) | ZOL (Belgium) | NOM (France) | HOO (Netherlands) | Points |
|---|---|---|---|---|---|---|---|---|---|
| 1 | Tomáš Kopecký (CZE) | (3) | 1 | 2 | (7) | 1 | 3 | (4) | 215 |
| 2 | Pim Ronhaar (NED) | 1 | 3 | 1 | (8) | (7) | | 5 | 200 |
| 3 | Mees Hendrikx (NED) | (6) | 2 | 3 | (6) | (8) | 1 | 3 | 200 |
| 4 | Loris Rouiller (SUI) | (7) | (6) | 4 | 1 | 5 | 4 | (12) | 175 |
| 5 | Jarno Bellens (BEL) | 4 | (5) | 5 | (12) | 2 | (9) | 2 | 175 |
| 6 | Niels Vandeputte (BEL) | (10) | 8 | (25) | (10) | 3 | 6 | 1 | 161 |
| 7 | Ryan Kamp (NED) | 2 | (7) | (14) | 2 | (9) | 7 | 7 | 156 |
| 8 | Ryan Cortjens (BEL) | | (12) | 7 | 4 | (22) | 2 | 10 | 140 |
| 9 | Ben Tulett (GBR) | 16 | | 16 | 3 | 4 | | (Ret) | 115 |
| 10 | Luke Verburg (NED) | (17) | 4 | 6 | (37) | 11 | (22) | 16 | 105 |
74 riders scored points
