= Gioele Bertolini =

Italian cyclist (born 1995)

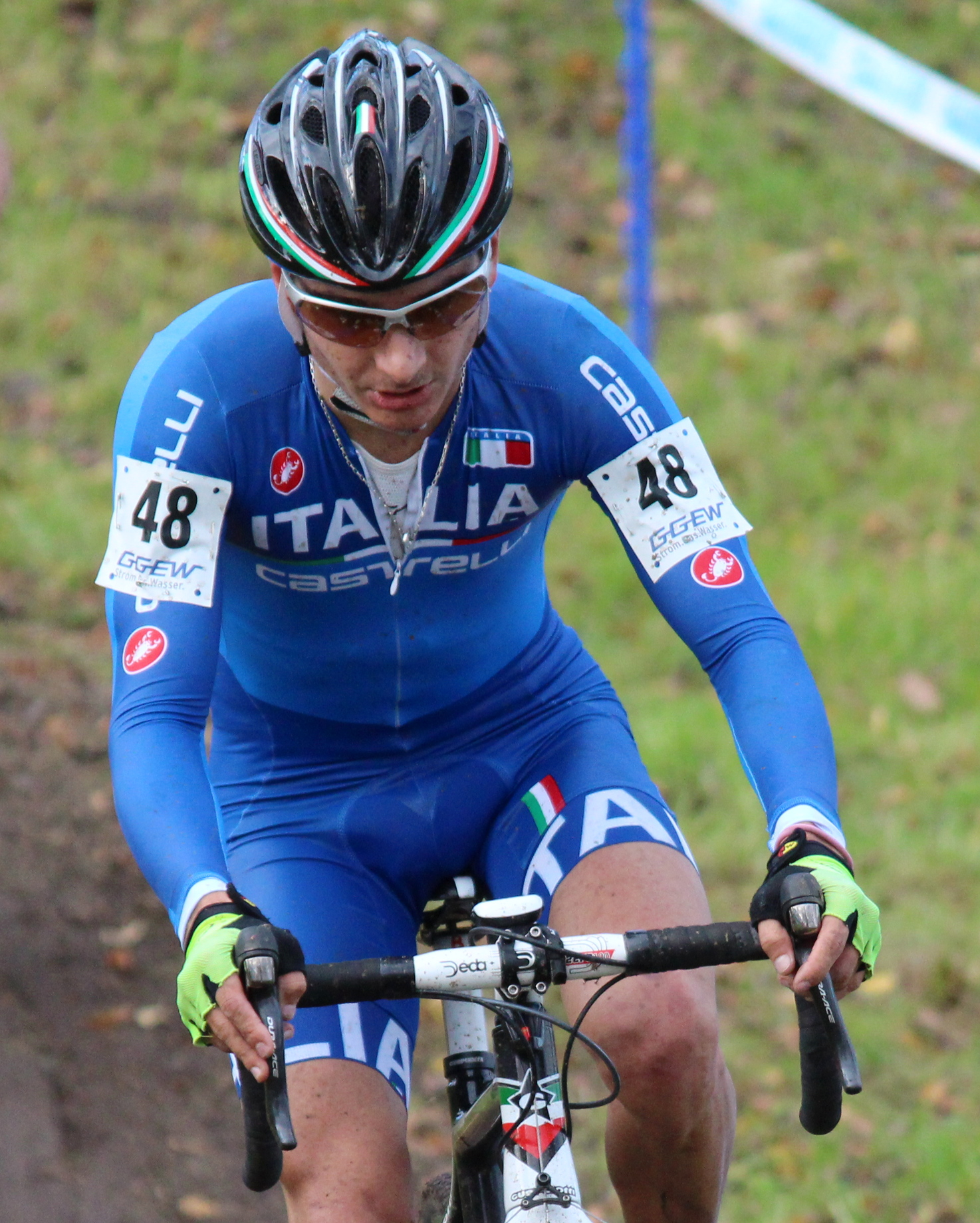

Personal information
- Born: 26 April 1995 (age 31) Morbegno, Italy

Cycling career
- Sport: Cycling
- Current team: Selle Italia–Guerciotti–Elite
- Disciplines: Cyclo-cross, Mountain
- Role: Rider

Professional team
- 2022–: Selle Italia–Guerciotti–Elite
Medal record
Representing Italy
Men's mountain bike racing
World Championships
Gold medal – first place	2013 Pietermaritzburg	Junior cross-country
Gold medal – first place	2013 Pietermaritzburg	Team relay
Bronze medal – third place	2015 Vallnord	Team relay
European Championships
Gold medal – first place	2017 Darfo Boario Terme	Under-23 cross-country
Gold medal – first place	2013 Bern	Team relay
Gold medal – first place	2012 Moscow	Team relay
Men's cyclo-cross
World Championships
Silver medal – second place	2025 Liévin	Team relay

Gioele Bertolini (born 26 April 1995) is an Italian mountain bike and cyclo-cross cyclist. He competed in the men's under-23 event at the 2016 UCI Cyclo-cross World Championships in Heusden-Zolder. He was on the start list for the 2018 European Cross-country Championship and finished 18th.

== Major results ==
=== Cyclo-cross ===
2011–2012
1st National Junior Championships
2012–2013
1st National Junior Championships
1st Junior Faè di Oderzo
1st Junior Milan
UCI Under-23 World Cup

2nd Rome
3rd Hoogerheide

2013–2014
1st National Under-23 Championships
2014–2015
Giro d'Italia Cross

1st Fiuggi
1st Portoferraio

Shinshu Cyclocross

1st Round 1
1st Round 2

1st Takashima City
2nd Faè di Oderzo
2015–2016
1st National Championships
UCI Under-23 World Cup

1st Cauberg
2nd Namur

3rd Overall Giro d'Italia Cross

1st Fiuggi
1st Asolo
1st Rome

1st Schio
EKZ CrossTour

2nd Eschenbach

2nd Faè di Oderzo
3rd Beromünster
2016–2017
1st National Championships
UCI Under-23 World Cup

1st Cauberg
2nd Fiuggi

1st Brugherio
2nd Faè di Oderzo
2nd Illnau
3rd Overall EKZ CrossTour

3rd Eschenbach

2017–2018
1st Brugherio
1st Faè di Oderzo
1st Gorizia
2nd Milan
6th UCI World Championships
2018–2019
1st National Championships
1st Gorizia
1st Pfaffnau
2nd Faè di Oderzo
2019–2020
2nd National Championships
2nd Faè di Oderzo
2nd Brugherio
3rd Vittorio Veneto
2020–2021
1st National Championships
2021–2022
2nd Gran Premio Mamma e Papa Guerciotti
2nd Hittnau
3rd Illnau
3rd Jesolo
3rd Increa Brugherio
2022–2023
1st Faè di Oderzo
2nd Hittnau
2nd Firenze
3rd Jesolo
2023–2024
1st Mugello
Swiss Cup

2nd Schneisingen
3rd Hittnau

2nd San Colombano Certénoli
2nd Osoppo
3rd National Championships
3rd Brugherio
2024–2025
1st Tarvisio
1st Osoppo
2nd Jesolo
3rd Illnau

=== Mountain Bike ===
2012
1st Team relay, UEC European Championships
2013
UCI World Championships

1st Junior cross-country
1st Team relay

1st Team relay, UEC European Championships
1st Cross-country, National Junior Championships
2015
3rd Team relay, UCI World Championships
2016
1st Cross-country, National Championships
2017
1st Cross-country, UEC European Under-23 Championships
1st Cross-country, National Championships
