= 2011 UCI Cyclo-cross World Championships – Women's elite race =

Women's Elite Cyclo-cross Race
2011 UCI Cyclo-cross World Championships
- Rainbow jersey

Race details
- Dates: January 30, 2011
- Stages: 1
- Winning time: 40' 31"

Medalists
	Gold	Marianne Vos (NED)
	Silver	Katie Compton (USA)
	Bronze	Kateřina Nash (CZE)

This event was held on Sunday 30 January 2011 as part of the 2011 UCI Cyclo-cross World Championships in Sankt Wendel, Germany.

== Ranking ==
Rank	Cyclist	Time
Gold medal	Marianne Vos (NED)	40:31
Silver medal	Katie Compton (USA)	+ 0:17
Bronze medal	Kateřina Nash (CZE)	+ 0:20
4	Hanka Kupfernagel (GER)	+ 0:42
5	Jasmin Achermann (SUI)	+ 1:10
6	Sanne Van Paassen (NED)	+ 1:20
7	Christel Ferrier-Bruneau (FRA)	+ 1:42
8	Pauline Ferrand-Prévot (FRA)	s.t.
9	Sanne Cant (BEL)	+ 2:00
10	Sabine Spitz (GER)	s.t.
11	Sophie De Boer (NED)	+ 2:11
12	Helen Wyman (GBR)	+ 3:00
13	Pavla Havliková (CZE)	+ 3:05
14	Linda Van Rijen (NED)	s.t.
15	Nikki Harris (GBR)	+ 3:08
16	Sabrina Schweizer (GER)	+ 3:09
17	Vania Rossi (ITA)	+ 3:30
18	Sabrina Stultiens (NED)	+ 3:31
19	Elisabeth Brandau (GER)	s.t.
20	Katrin Leumann (SUI)	+ 3:50
21	Christine Majerus (LUX)	+ 3:52
22	Arenda Grimberg (NED)	+ 3:55
23	Gabriella Day (GBR)	+ 3:58
24	Martina Zwick (GER)	+ 4:14
25	Caroline Mani (FRA)	+ 4:28
26	Amy Dombroski (USA)	+ 4:33
27	Meredith Miller (USA)	+ 4:36
28	Ellen Van Loy (BEL)	+ 4:42
29	Matrina Mikulaskova (CZE)	+ 5:03
30	Kaitlin Antonneau (USA)	+ 5:24
31	Natasha Elliott (CAN)	+ 5:33
32	Lucia Gonzalez Blanco (ESP)	+ 6:34
33	Reza Hormes (NED)	Lapped
34	Aida Nuno Palacio (ESP)	"
35	Isabel Castro Cal (ESP)	"
36	Elke Riedl (AUT)	"
37	Asa Maria Erlandsson (SWE)	"
38	Karin Aune (SWE)	"
39	Dorota Warczyk (POL)	"
40	Elena Valentini (ITA)	"
41	Genevieve Whitson (NZL)	"
42	Liga Šmite (LAT)	"
43	Laura Baziulyte (LTU)	"
44	Greete Steinburg (EST)	"
