= 2016–17 UCI Cyclo-cross World Cup =

Bicycle racing competition

2016–2017 UCI Cyclo-cross World Cup

Details
- Location: United States, Belgium, the Netherlands, Germany & Italy
- Races: 9 (Note: Later reduced to 8 due to the cancellation of the Koksijde event.)

Champions
- Male individual champion: Wout van Aert (BEL) (Crelan–Vastgoedservice & Vérandas Willems–Crelan (Note: In the 2016 races, van Aert rode for Crelan–Vastgoedservice, and for Vérandas Willems–Crelan in the 2017 races.))
- Female individual champion: Sophie de Boer (NED) (Kalas–NNOF & Breepark (Note: In the 2016 races, de Boer rode for Kalas–NNOF, and for Breepark in the 2017 races.))

The 2016–2017 UCI Cyclo-cross World Cup – also known as the Telenet UCI Cyclo-cross World Cup for sponsorship reasons – was a season long cyclo-cross competition, organised by the Union Cycliste Internationale (UCI). The competition took place between 21 September 2016 and 22 January 2017, over a total of nine events. The defending champions were Wout van Aert in the men's competition and Sanne Cant in the women's competition.

Van Aert was able to defend his World Cup title with a round to spare, not finishing any lower than second in the seven races – four wins and three second-place finishes – prior to his crowning. His main rival Mathieu van der Poel was the only other rider to take victories prior to the title being won, taking three straight wins during the season, but he missed several meetings, including the Memorial Romano Scotti in Rome, which allowed van Aert to take the title.

With six different winners in as many races, the women's competition proved competitive. After a win at CrossVegas, Dutch rider Sophie de Boer held the leaders' jersey and despite Katie Compton taking the jersey after the following round at the Jingle Cross, de Boer was able to regain the jersey with consistent finishing. Over the next five races – despite not winning any races – de Boer achieved finishes of second, fourth, third and sixth, and with Cant missing the round in Rome, another third-place finish gave de Boer her first Cyclo-cross World Cup title.

== Points distribution ==
Points were awarded to all eligible riders each race. The top ten finishers received points according to the following table:

Points distribution
Position	1	2	3	4	5	6	7	8	9	10
Points	80	70	65	60	55	50	48	46	44	42

Riders finishing in positions 11 to 50 also received points, going down from 40 points for 11th place by one point per place to 1 point for 50th place.

== Events ==
In comparison to last season's seven races, this season was scheduled to have nine. Lignières-en-Berry was taken out of the programme – while Rome (Fiuggi), Iowa and Zeven were added.

Date	Race	Location	Winners			
Date	Race	Location	Elite men	Elite women	Under-23 men	Junior men
21 September	CrossVegas	Las Vegas, United States	Wout van Aert (BEL)	Sophie de Boer (NED)	No under-23 or junior race	
24 September	Jingle Cross	Iowa City, United States	Wout van Aert (BEL)	Katie Compton (USA)	No under-23 or junior race	
23 October	Caubergcross	Valkenburg, Netherlands	Mathieu van der Poel (NED)	Thalita de Jong (NED)	Gioele Bertolini (ITA)	Yentl Bekaert (BEL)
20 November	Duinencross	Koksijde, Belgium	Races cancelled due to bad weather			
26 November	Poldercross Zeven	Zeven, Germany	Mathieu van der Poel (NED)	Sanne Cant (BEL)	Joris Nieuwenhuis (NED)	Jelle Camps (BEL)
18 December	Citadelcross	Namur, Belgium	Mathieu van der Poel (NED)	Kateřina Nash (CZE)	Joris Nieuwenhuis (NED)	Tom Pidcock (GBR)
26 December	Grand Prix Erik De Vlaeminck	Heusden-Zolder, Belgium	Wout van Aert (BEL)	Marianne Vos (NED)	Joris Nieuwenhuis (NED)	Thymen Arensman (NED)
15 January	Memorial Romano Scotti	Fiuggi, Italy	Wout van Aert (BEL)	Marianne Vos (NED)	Eli Iserbyt (BEL)	Antoine Benoist (FRA)
22 January	Grand Prix Adri van der Poel	Hoogerheide, Netherlands	Lars van der Haar (NED)	Marianne Vos (NED)	Joris Nieuwenhuis (NED)	Tom Pidcock (GBR)

== Final individual standings ==
=== Men ===
Rank	Name	Points
1	Wout van Aert (BEL)	530
2	Kevin Pauwels (BEL)	474
3	Tom Meeusen (BEL)	447
4	Michael Vanthourenhout (BEL)	384
5	Laurens Sweeck (BEL)	373
6	Corné van Kessel (NED)	345
7	Tim Merlier (BEL)	344
8	Mathieu van der Poel (NED)	304
9	Toon Aerts (BEL)	301
10	Marcel Meisen (GER)	297

=== Women ===
Rank	Name	Points
1	Sophie de Boer (NED)	484
2	Sanne Cant (BEL)	395
3	Kateřina Nash (CZE)	393
4	Ellen Van Loy (BEL)	353
5	Eva Lechner (ITA)	298
6	Ellen Noble (USA)	282
7	Amanda Miller (USA)	279
8	Caroline Mani (FRA)	270
9	Katie Compton (USA)	249
10	Laura Verdonschot (BEL)	246
