= 2017 UCI Cyclo-cross World Championships – Women's elite race =

Women's elite race
2017 UCI Cyclo-cross World Championships
- Rainbow jersey

Race details
- Dates: 28 January 2017
- Stages: 1
- Distance: 15.55 km (9.662 mi)
- Winning time: 43' 06"

Medalists
	Gold	Sanne Cant (Belgium)
	Silver	Marianne Vos (Netherlands)
	Bronze	Kateřina Nash (Czech Republic)

This event was held on 28 January 2017 as a part of the 2017 UCI Cyclo-cross World Championships in Bieles, Luxembourg. Participants must be women born in 2000 or before. The race was won by Sanne Cant of Belgium, winning her first title.

== Race report ==
The fastest starter was Ellen Van Loy who took the head start but did not manage to get away from the bunch. At the end of the first lap, eight riders were still within 6 seconds: Eva Lechner, Marianne Vos, Sanne Cant, Kateřina Nash, Lucinda Brand, home rider Christine Majerus, surprise Maghalie Rochette and Van Loy.

Vos, Cant and Brand opened up a gap and separated as a group; Vos tried several times to break away but Cant each time managed to close the gap with Brand trailing slightly. On the fourth of five laps, Cant slipped and lost about ten seconds, therefore Vos went into the final lap with eight seconds advantage. Meanwhile, Nash had come back from behind and was leading Brand by a few seconds for third place.

On the final lap, Vos' chain dropped, forcing her to step off the bike and manually put it back in place which allowed Cant to close the gap. The two battled it out on the slippery last half lap, overtaking each other several times. At the final real obstacle, a steep descent, Cant was able to overtake Vos and kept the lead onto the final straight, outsprinting Vos to take her first world title. Twenty seconds later, Nash outsprinted Brand for third place.

== Results ==
Rank	Cyclist	Time
Gold medal	Sanne Cant (BEL)	43' 06"
Silver medal	Marianne Vos (NED)	+ 1"
Bronze medal	Kateřina Nash (CZE)	+ 21"
4	Lucinda Brand (NED)	+ 21"
5	Maghalie Rochette (CAN)	+ 36"
6	Eva Lechner (ITA)	+ 53"
7	Christine Majerus (LUX)	+ 1' 21"
8	Ellen Van Loy (BEL)	+ 1' 25"
9	Nikki Brammeier (GBR)	+ 1' 31"
10	Kaitlin Antonneau (USA)	+ 1' 46"
11	Elle Anderson (USA)	+ 2' 29"
12	Caroline Mani (FRA)	+ 2' 40"
13	Amanda Miller (USA)	+ 2' 49"
14	Marlene Petit (FRA)	+ 2' 53"
15	Courtenay McFadden (USA)	+ 2' 53"
16	Helen Wyman (GBR)	+ 3' 06"
17	Alicia Franck (BEL)	+ 3' 12"
18	Lucie Chainel (FRA)	+ 3' 19"
19	Lucía González Blanco (ESP)	+ 3' 29"
20	Mical Dyck (CAN)	+ 4' 27"
21	Rebecca Fahringer (USA)	+ 4' 49"
22	Lise-marie Henzelin (SUI)	+ 5' 13"
23	Nathalie Lamborelle (LUX)	+ 5' 51"
24	Cindy Montambault (CAN)	+ 6' 06"
25	Magdalena Sadlecka (POL)	+ 6' 30"
26	Jolien Verschueren (BEL)	+ 6' 36"
27	Hannah Payton (GBR)	+ 6' 40"
28	Stefanie Paul (GER)	+ 8' 05"
29	Eri Yonamine (JPN)	+ 8' 15"
31	Aida Nuño Palacio (ESP)	+ 1 lap
32	Naomi Williams (AUS)	+ 1 lap
33	Rikke Lonne (DEN)	+ 1 lap
34	Kristina Thrane (DEN)	+ 1 lap
35	Waka Takeda (JPN)	+ 1 lap
36	Rebecca Locke (AUS)	+ 2 laps
37	Suzie Godart (LUX)	+ 2 laps
	Katie Compton (USA)	DNF5
	Loes Sels (BEL)	DNF5
	Sophie de Boer (NED)	DNF4
	Maud Kaptheijns (NED)	DNF2
	Pavla Havlíková (CZE)	DNF1
	Alice Maria Arzuffi (ITA)	DNF1
