= Kateřina Nash =

Czech skier and cyclist (born 1977)

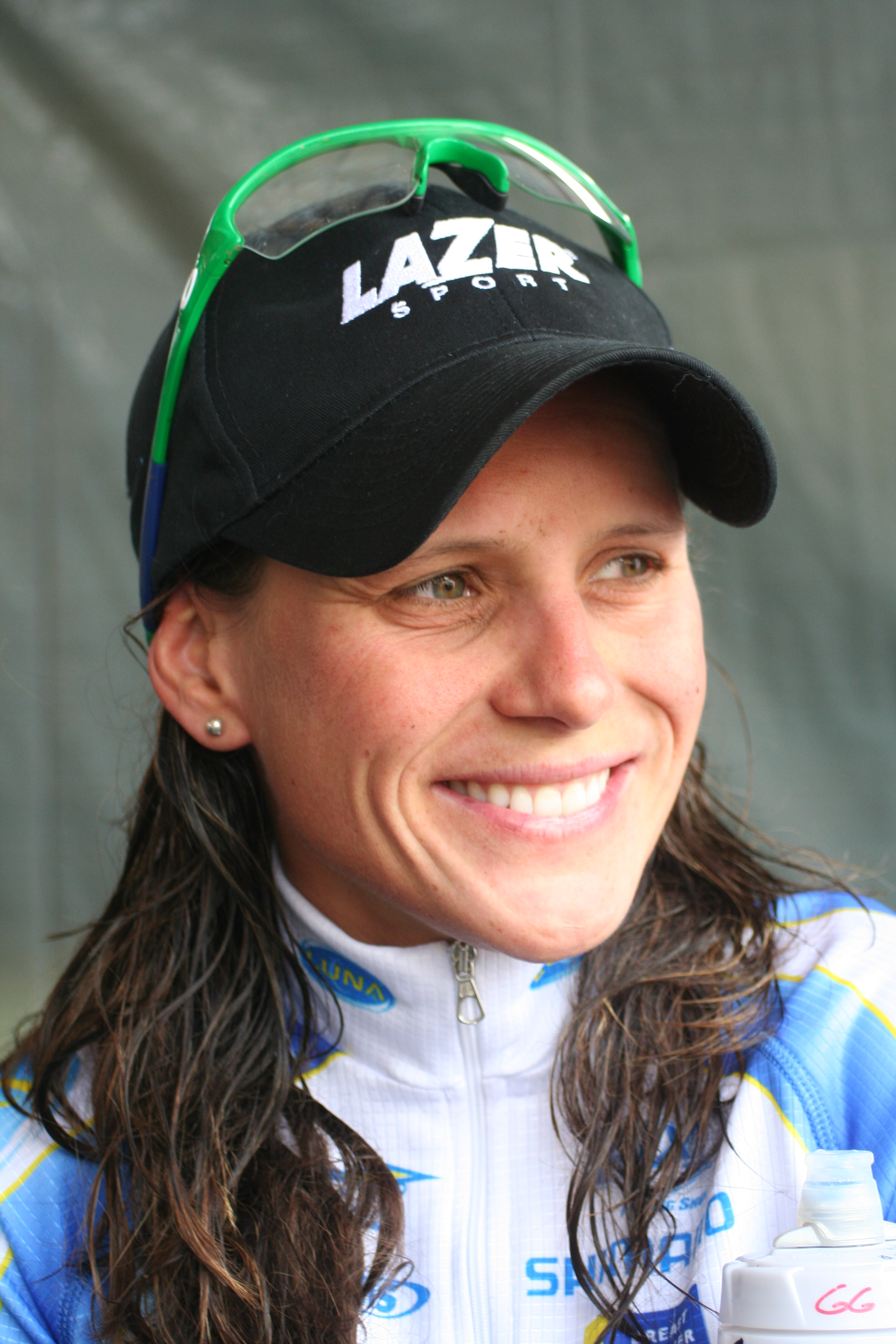

Personal information
- Full name: Kateřina Nash
- Born: Kateřina Hanušová; 9 December 1977 (age 48): Prachatice, Czechoslovakia; (now Czech Republic)

Cycling career
- Sport: Cycling
- Current team: Clif Pro Team
- Disciplines: Road; Cyclo-cross; Mountain biking
- Role: Rider

Professional teams
- 2002–: Luna Women's MTB Team
- 2017–2018: Team Illuminate (road)

Major wins
- Cyclo-cross National Championships (2010, 2011, 2015) World Cup 7 individual wins (2009–10, 2011–12, 2014–15—2017–18, 2019–20) Mountain bike National XC Championships (2010, 2017) XC World Cup 1 individual win (2013)
Medal record
Representing Czech Republic
Women's cyclo-cross
World Championships
Bronze medal – third place	2011 Sankt Wendel	Elite
Bronze medal – third place	2017 Bieles	Elite
Women's cross-country skiing
Junior World Championships
Gold medal – first place	1994 Breitenwang	4 × 5 km relay
Silver medal – second place	1995 Gällivare	4 × 5 km relay

Kateřina Nash (née Hanušová; born 9 December 1977) is a Czech cross-country skier and cyclist who competed from 1994 to 2003 in skiing and is still active in cycling for the Clif Pro Team. Competing in two Winter Olympics, she finished sixth in the 4 × 5 km relay at Nagano in 1998 and had her best individual finish of 20th in the 15 km event in Salt Lake City in 2002.

Since September 2021 Nash serves as Vice-President of the Union Cycliste Internationale (UCI).

== Career ==
Nash was born in Prachatice.

=== Cross-country skiing ===
Nash's best finish at the FIS Nordic World Ski Championships was 19th in the 5 km + 10 km combined pursuit at Ramsau in 1999. Her best World cup finish was 18th in a 5 km + 5 km combined pursuit in the United States in 2001.

Nash earned four individual career victories up to 10 km in FIS races from 1997 to 2001.

=== Bicycle racing ===
In January 2010 she won an UCI Cyclo-cross World Cup race in Roubaix and also finished 4th in 2010 UCI Cyclo-cross World Championships and 3rd in 2011 UCI Cyclo-cross World Championships.

She competed at the 2012 Summer Olympics, finishing in 14th place in the women's cross-country mountain bike event.

On 16 September 2015 she won the CrossVegas Cyclocross World Cup race in Las Vegas, Nevada, which was the first-ever UCI Cyclo-cross World Cup race to be run outside Europe. Following her World Cup victory, she won The Night Weasels Cometh in Shrewsbury, Massachusetts on 30 September 2015.

== Cross-country skiing results ==
All results are sourced from the International Ski Federation (FIS).

=== Olympic Games ===
Year	Age	5 km	10 km	15 km	Pursuit	30 km	Sprint	4 × 5 km relay
1998	20	22	—N/a	—	24	23	—N/a	6
2002	24	—N/a	—	20	62	40	—	4

=== World Championships ===
Year	Age	5 km	15 km	Pursuit	30 km	4 × 5 km relay
1997	19	—	36	—	—	—
1999	21	33	33	19	—	7

=== World Cup ===
==== Season standings ====
Season	Age			
Season	Age	Overall	Long Distance	Sprint
1996	18	NC	—N/a	—N/a
1997	19	76	49	NC
1998	20	75	48	NC
1999	21	48	58	63
2001	23	81	—N/a	NC
2002	24	NC	—N/a	—

==== Team podiums ====
- 1 victory – (1 TS)
- 1 podium – (1 TS)

No.	Season	Date	Location	Race	Level	Place	Teammate
1	1998–99	8 March 1999	Vantaa, Finland	Team Sprint F	World Cup	1st	Neumannová

== Cycling results ==
=== Cyclo-cross ===
2007–2008
3rd Las Vegas
2008–2009
2nd Las Vegas
3rd UEC European Championships
UCI World Cup

3rd Pijnacker

2009–2010
1st National Championships
UCI World Cup

1st Roubaix
4th Hoogerheide
5th Nommay

2nd Las Vegas
4th UCI World Championships
4th UEC European Championships
2010–2011
1st National Championships
1st Las Vegas
3rd UCI World Championships
UCI World Cup

3rd Aigle
3rd Plzeň
3rd Kalmthout
5th Hoogerheide

2011–2012
UCI World Cup

1st Tábor
3rd Plzeň
3rd Hoogerheide

2012–2013
Bpost Bank Trophy

1st Baal
3rd Loenhout

Superprestige

1st Diegem

UCI World Cup

2nd Namur
3rd Fiuggi
4th Heusden-Zolder

4th UCI World Championships
2013–2014
1st Las Vegas
2014–2015
1st National Championships
UCI World Cup

1st Namur
2nd Heusden-Zolder
2nd Hoogerheide

Bpost Bank Trophy

1st Loenhout
1st Baal

Superprestige

3rd Diegem

5th UCI World Championships
2015–2016
UCI World Cup

1st Las Vegas

2016–2017
3rd Overall UCI World Cup

1st Namur
2nd Las Vegas
2nd Fiuggi
3rd Heusden-Zolder
4th Iowa City

Toi Toi Cup

1st Unicov

3rd UCI World Championships
Superprestige

3rd Diegem

DVV Trophy

3rd Antwerpen

2017–2018
UCI World Cup

1st Iowa City
4th Zeven

2018–2019
2nd Zonnebeke
Toi Toi Cup

2nd Kolin

UCI World Cup

3rd Waterloo

2019–2020
3rd Overall UCI World Cup

1st Waterloo
2nd Iowa City
5th Namur

Toi Toi Cup

1st Jabkenice
1st Unicov

=== Mountain bike ===
2009
UCI XCO World Cup

3rd Mont-Sainte-Anne

3rd Pelham
3rd Colorado Springs
2010
1st Cross-country, National Championships
UCI XCO World Cup

3rd Dalby Forest
5th Champéry
5th Val di Sole

3rd Dripping Springs
2011
3rd Monterey
3rd Missoula
UCI XCO World Cup

4th Mont-Sainte-Anne

2012
UCI XCO World Cup

2nd La Bresse
2nd Windham
3rd Nové Město
4th Mont-Sainte-Anne

2013
UCI XCO World Cup

1st Mont-Sainte-Anne
2nd Val di Sole
2nd Vallnord

2nd Mount Morris
4th Cross-country, UEC European Championships
2014
US Cup

1st Dripping Springs
1st San Dimas
1st Colorado Springs
2nd Fontana

1st Missoula
2nd Williston
UCI XCO World Cup

3rd Mont-Sainte-Anne

2015
US Cup

1st Fontana
2nd Colorado Springs

2016
US Cup

1st Monterey
1st Walpole
3rd San Dimas

Czech MTB Cup

2nd Kutná Hora

UCI XCO World Cup

4th La Bresse
4th Lenzerheide
5th Mont-Sainte-Anne

5th Cross-country, Olympic Games
2017
1st Cross-country, National Championships
2019
1st Overall Breckenridge
3rd Overall Midway
2021
1st Dolní Morava Marathon
2nd Telluride 100 Marathon
2023
3rd Overall Cape Epic

1st Prologue
