= Jakob Dorigoni =

Italian cyclist

Personal information
- Born: 10 March 1998 (age 28)
- Height: 1.72 m (5 ft 8 in)
- Weight: 64 kg (141 lb)

Cycling career
- Sport: Cycling
- Current team: Selle Italia–Guerciotti–Elite
- Disciplines: Cyclo-cross; Road
- Role: Rider

Amateur team
- 2017–2018: General Store Bottoli Zardini

Professional teams
- 2019: Team Colpack
- 2020: Work Service–Dinatek–Vega
- 2021–: Selle Italia–Guerciotti–Elite

Jakob Dorigoni (born 10 March 1998) is an Italian cyclo-cross and road cyclist, who currently rides for UCI Cyclo-cross team Selle Italia–Guerciotti–Elite.

== Major results ==
=== Cyclo-cross ===
2014–2015
1st National Junior Championships
1st Junior Milan
Junior Giro d'Italia Cross

1st Rossano Veneto
3rd Fiuggi
3rd Isola d'Elba
3rd Padova
3rd Roma

7th UCI Junior World Championships
2015–2016
1st National Junior Championships
Junior Giro d'Italia Cross

1st Roma
1st Fiuggi

UCI Junior World Cup

2nd Lignières-en-Berry

6th UCI Junior World Championships
2016–2017
1st National Under-23 Championships
2017–2018
1st National Under-23 Championships
2018–2019
1st National Under-23 Championships
UCI Under-23 World Cup

2nd Tábor
2nd Namur
3rd Pontchâteau

2019–2020
1st National Championships
1st Vittorio Veneto
1st Brugherio
2nd Milan
UCI Under-23 World Cup

3rd Namur

3rd Saccolongo
2020–2021
Toi Toi Cup

1st Jičín

2nd National Championships
2021–2022
1st National Championships
1st Cremona
2nd Lutterbach
2nd Brugherio
3rd Fae' Di Oderzo
2022–2023
2nd Milan
3rd National Championships
3rd Vittorio Veneto
2023–2024
2nd National Championships

=== Road ===
2018
4th GP Capodarco
