= Daniele Braidot =

Italian cyclist (born 1991)

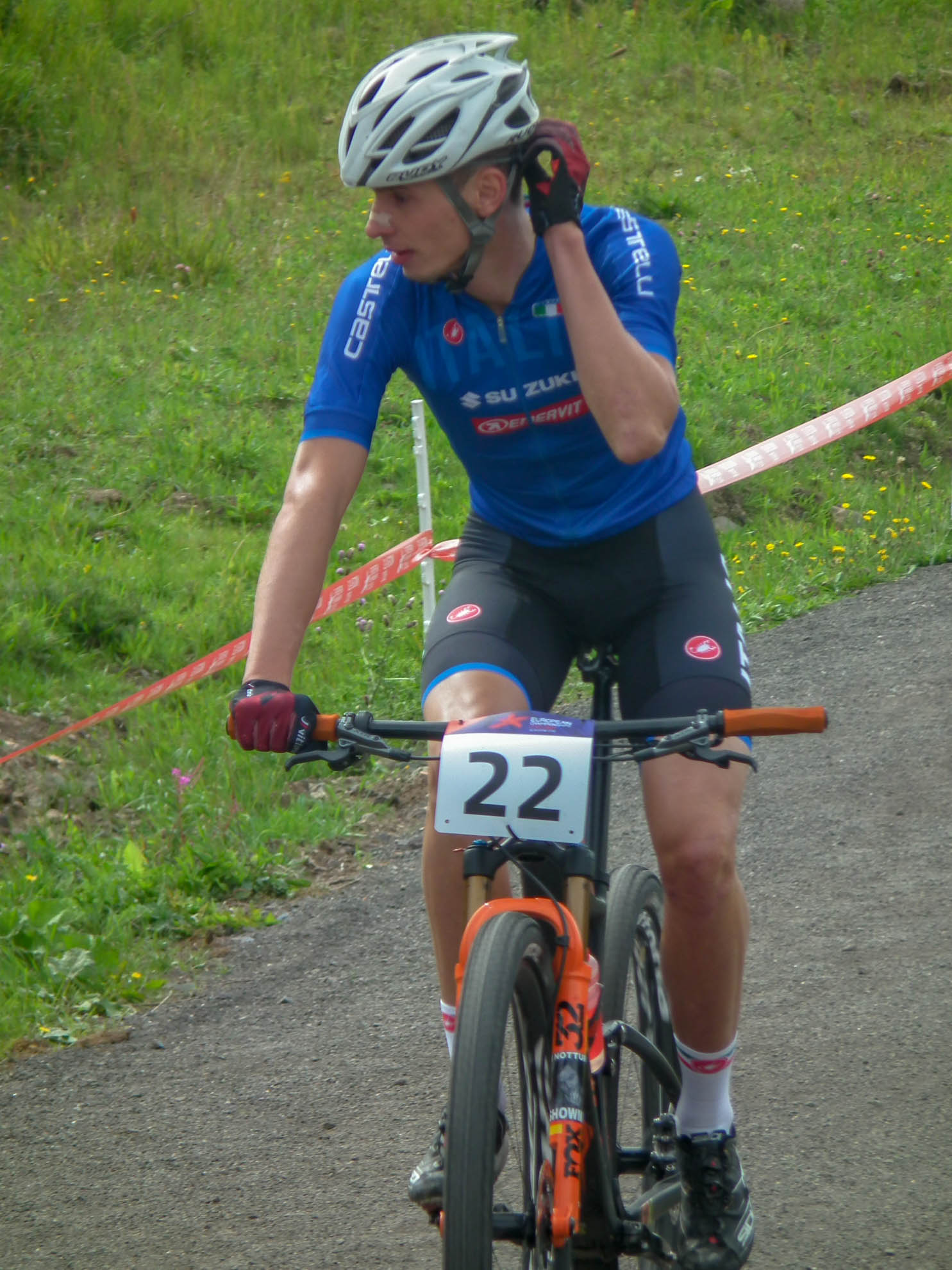
- Braidot at the 2018 European Mountain Bike Championships

Personal information
- Born: 29 May 1991 (age 35) Gorizia, Italy
- Height: 1.79 m (5 ft 10 in)
- Weight: 69 kg (152 lb)

Cycling career
- Sport: Cycling
- Current team: CS Carabinieri–Cicli Olympia–Vittoria
- Disciplines: Mountain bike; Cyclo-cross
- Role: Rider

Amateur team
- 2018: Centro Sportivo Carabinieri

Professional team
- 2019–: CS Carabinieri–Cicli–Olympia
Medal record
Representing Italy
Men's mountain bike racing
World Championships
Bronze medal – third place	2012 Saalfelden-Leogang	Under-23 Cross-country

Daniele Braidot (born 29 May 1991) is an Italian professional mountain bike and cyclo-cross cyclist.

His twin brother Luca is also a professional cyclist.

== Major results ==
=== MTB ===
2009
3rd National Junior XCO Championships
2012
3rd UCI World Under-23 XCO Championships
2013
3rd National Under-23 XCO Championships
2014
3rd National XCE Championships
2015
2nd National XCO Championships
2016
1st National Championship
2019
2nd National XCO Championships

=== Cyclo-cross ===
2008–2009
1st National Junior Championships
3rd Trofeo Città di Lucca Juniors
8th UCI Junior World Championships
2010–2011
2nd National Under-23 Championships
2011–2012
2nd National Under-23 Championships
2012–2013
2nd National Under-23 Championships
2014–2015
3rd National Championships
2016–2017
3rd Gran Premio Città di Vittorio Veneto
2017–2018
2nd National Championships
2018–2019
3rd National Championships
3rd Ciclocross del Ponte
