= Ryan Cortjens =

Belgian cyclist (born 2001)

Personal information
- Full name: Ryan Cortjens
- Born: 8 January 2001 (age 25) Genk, Belgium
- Height: 1.84 m (6 ft 0 in)
- Weight: 76 kg (168 lb)

Cycling career
- Sport: Cycling
- Current team: Retired
- Disciplines: Road; Cyclo-cross
- Role: Rider

Amateur teams
- 2017–2020: IKO Enertherm–Beobank (road)
- 2020: Alpecin–Fenix (road; stagiaire)

Professional teams
- 2019–2020: Corendon–Circus (cyclo-cross)
- 2021–2023: Alpecin–Fenix Development Team
Medal record
Representing Belgium
Men's cyclo-cross
World Championships
Bronze medal – third place	2019 Bogense	Junior race

Ryan Cortjens (born 8 January 2001) is a Belgian former cyclist, who competed as a professional from 2019 to 2023. In 2019, he won the bronze medal at the Junior World Cyclocross Championships in Bogense.

== Major results ==
2017–2018
Junior DVV Trophy

1st Loenhout

UCI Junior World Cup

2nd Nommay

2nd Junior Hasselt
Junior Superprestige

3rd Gavere

3rd Junior Contern
2018–2019
1st National Junior Championships
2nd Overall UCI Junior World Cup

1st Heusden-Zolder
1st Namur

2nd Overall Junior Superprestige

1st Gavere
1st Zonhoven
2nd Ruddervoorde
2nd Hoogstraten
3rd Diegem

Junior DVV Trophy

1st Loenhout
1st Brussels

Junior Brico Cross

1st Essen

1st Hasselt
1st Overijse
3rd UCI World Junior Championships
3rd Junior Neerpelt
