= 2019 UCI Cyclo-cross World Championships =

Cyclo-cross championship

- Venue: Bogense, Denmark
- Date: 2–3 February
- Coordinates: 55°34′N 10°06′E
- Nations participating: 24
- Cyclists participating: 289
- Events: 5

The 2019 UCI Cyclo-cross World Championships were the World Championship for cyclo-cross for the season 2018–19. These were held in Bogense in Denmark on 2 and 3 February 2019. The championships featured five events; men's races for elite, under-23 and junior riders, and women's races for elite and under-23 riders.

== Schedule ==
All times are local (UTC+1).

Date	Time	Event
2 February	11:00	Men's junior
2 February	13:00	Men's under-23
2 February	15:00	Women's elite
3 February	11:00	Women's under-23
3 February	15:00	Men's elite

== Medal summary ==
=== Medals table ===
Rank	Nation	Gold	Silver	Bronze	Total
1	Netherlands (NED)	2	2	2	6
2	Great Britain (GBR)	2	0	0	2
3	Belgium (BEL)	1	3	2	6
4	France (FRA)	0	0	1	1
Totals (4 entries)		5	5	5	15

=== Medalists ===
Event	Gold		Silver		Bronze	
Men's events
Men's elite race	Mathieu van der Poel; Netherlands	1h 09' 20"	Wout van Aert; Belgium	+ 16"	Toon Aerts; Belgium	+ 25"
Men's under-23 race	Tom Pidcock; Great Britain	47' 42"	Eli Iserbyt; Belgium	+ 15"	Antoine Benoist; France	+ 23"
Men's junior race	Ben Tulett; Great Britain	42' 29"	Witse Meeussen; Belgium	+ 20"	Ryan Cortjens; Belgium	+ 27"
Women's events
Women's elite race	Sanne Cant; Belgium	47' 53"	Lucinda Brand; Netherlands	+ 9"	Marianne Vos; Netherlands	+ 15"
Women's under-23 race	Inge van der Heijden; Netherlands	42' 09"	Fleur Nagengast; Netherlands	+ 3"	Ceylin del Carmen Alvarado; Netherlands	+ 8"
