= Witse Meeussen =

Belgian cyclist

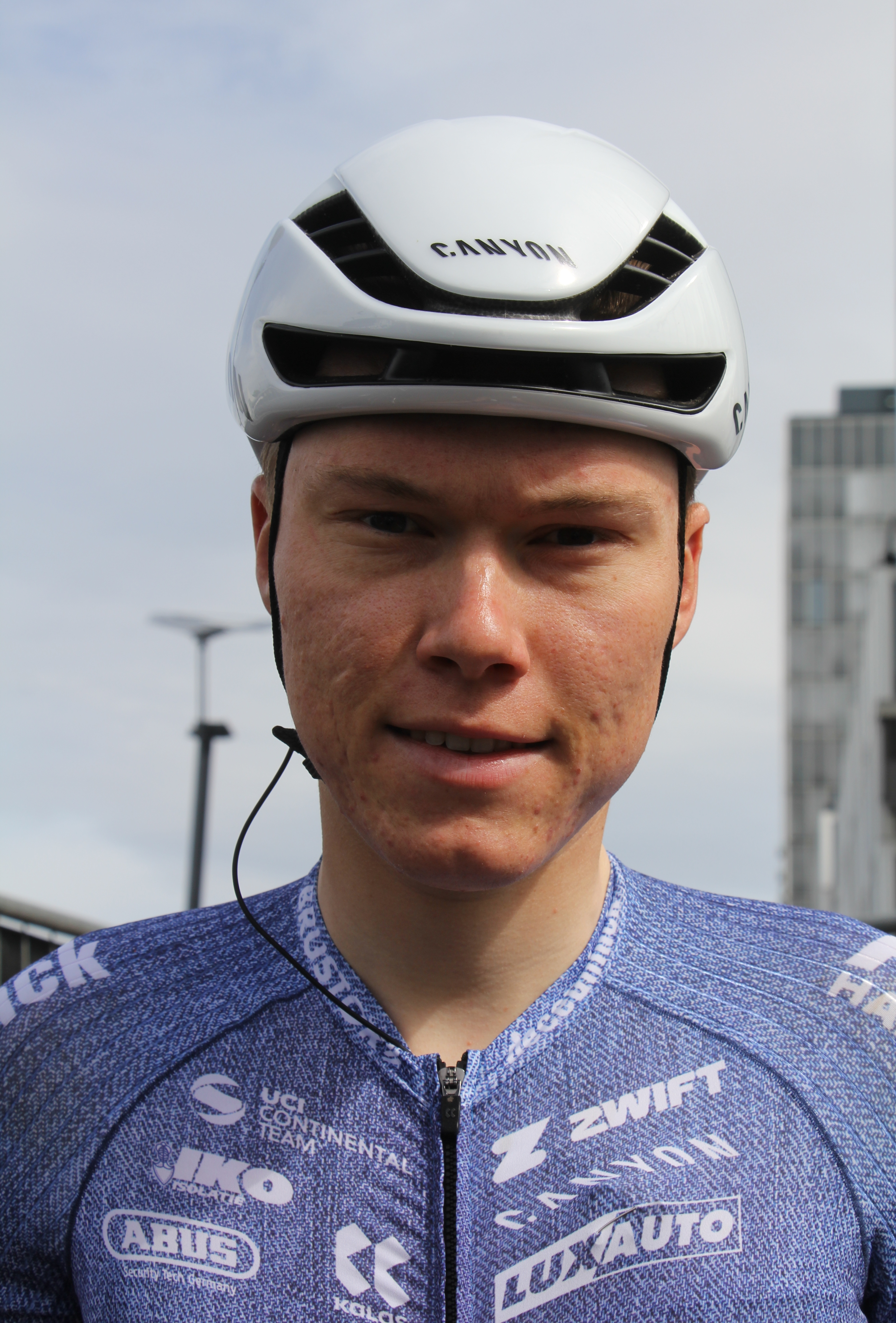
- Meeussen in 2024

Personal information
- Full name: Witse Meeussen
- Born: 8 March 2001 (age 25) Turnhout, Belgium

Cycling career
- Sport: Cycling
- Current team: Alpecin–Premier Tech Development Team (road); Crelan–Corendon (cyclo-cross)
- Disciplines: Cyclo-cross; Road
- Role: Rider

Professional teams
- 2020–2023: Pauwels Sauzen–Bingoal
- 2023–: Alpecin–Deceuninck Development Team (road)
- 2023–: Crelan–Corendon (cyclo-cross)
Medal record
Men's cyclo-cross
Representing Belgium
World Championships
Silver medal – second place	2019 Bogense	Junior race
Bronze medal – third place	2023 Hoogerheide	Under-23
European Championships
Silver medal – second place	2018 Tábor	Junior race
Bronze medal – third place	2022 Namur	Under-23 race
Bronze medal – third place	2023 Pontchâteau	Team relay

Witse Meeussen (born 8 March 2001) is a Belgian cyclo-cross and road cyclist, who currently rides for UCI Continental team Alpecin–Premier Tech Development Team in road racing and Crelan–Corendon in cyclo-cross. In 2019, he won the silver medal in the junior race at the 2019 UCI Cyclo-cross World Championships in Bogense, Denmark.

== Personal life ==
Meeussen is currently studying Sports and Movement Sciences at KU Leuven.

== Major results ==
=== Cyclo-cross ===
2017–2018
2nd National Junior Championships
Junior Soudal Classics

2nd Neerpelt

Junior DVV Trophy

3rd Lille

3rd Junior Oostmalle
2018–2019
1st Overall UCI Junior World Cup

1st Bern
1st Tábor
1st Hoogerheide
2nd Koksijde
2nd Pontchâteau
3rd Namur

1st Overall Junior Superprestige

1st Gieten
1st Ruddervoorde
1st Diegem
1st Middelkerke
2nd Gavere
3rd Hoogstraten

Junior Brico Cross

1st Ronse
2nd Geraardsbergen

1st Junior Oostmalle
1st Junior Wachtebeke
Junior DVV Trophy

2nd Brussels
2nd Lille

2nd UCI World Junior Championships
2nd UEC European Junior Championships
2nd National Junior Championships
2022–2023
1st National Under-23 Championships
National Trophy Series

1st Derby

2nd Mechelen
3rd Overall UCI Under-23 World Cup

2nd Zonhoven
2nd Besançon
3rd Maasmechelen

Under-23 X²O Badkamers Trophy

2nd Kortrijk
2nd Brussels
3rd Koksijde

3rd Oisterwijk
3rd UCI World Under-23 Championships
3rd UEC European Under-23 Championships
2023–2024
3rd Team relay, UEC European Championships
2024–2025
3rd Ardooie

=== Road ===
2019
4th Grand Prix Bob Jungels
2023
5th Overall Giro della Valle d'Aosta
