= Mees Hendrikx =

Dutch cyclist (born 2000)

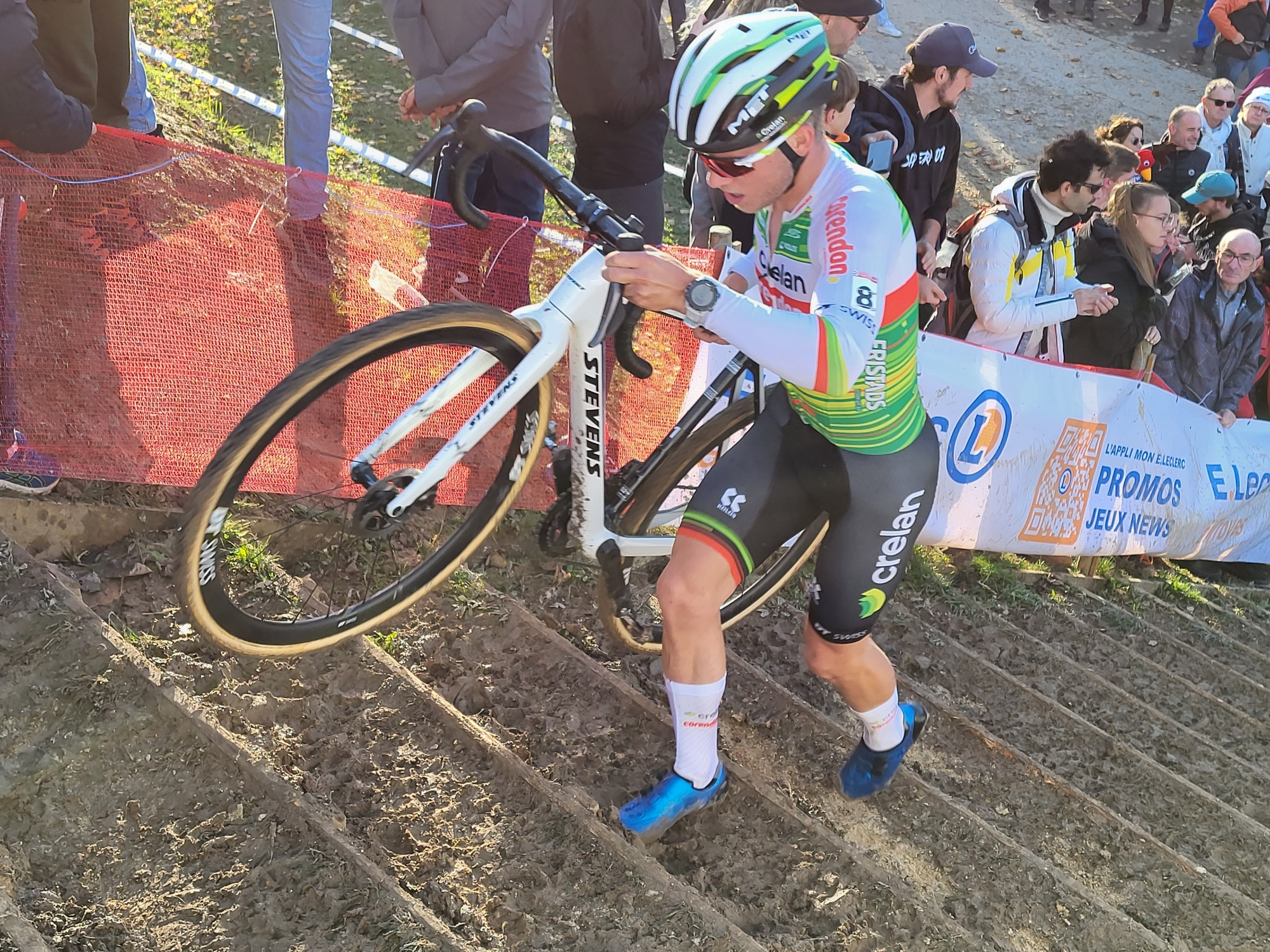
- Hendrikx in 2023

Personal information
- Born: 5 August 2000 (age 26) Valkenswaard, the Netherlands
- Height: 1.74 m (5 ft 9 in)
- Weight: 61 kg (134 lb)

Cycling career
- Sport: Cycling
- Current team: Crelan–Corendon
- Disciplines: Cyclo-cross; Road
- Role: Rider

Professional teams
- 2020: Alpecin–Fenix (stagiaire)
- 2020–2021: Credishop–Fristads (cyclo-cross)
- 2021–2023: Alpecin–Fenix Development Team (road)
- 2021–: IKO–Crelan (cyclo-cross)
Medal record
Men's cyclo-cross
Representing Netherlands
World Championships
Bronze medal – third place	2020 Dübendorf	Under-23 Race

Mees Hendrikx (born 8 August 2000) is a Dutch cyclist, who currently rides for UCI Cyclo-cross team Crelan–Corendon.

== Career ==
Hendrikx was a promising junior rider, winning the junior race at the Grand Prix Nommay, part of the 2017–18 UCI Cyclo-cross World Cup where he finished third in the overall classification with four podium finishes in 7 races. After a disappointing, injury-riddled winter season in 2018-2019 he couldn't find a team. As an independent rider, he achieved more success in the next cyclo-cross season, culminating in his selection for the Dutch team for the 2020 UCI Cyclo-cross World Championships in Switzerland, where he won the bronze medal in the U23 category.

In the 2021–2022 season, he won his first U23 World Cup race with the Cyklokros Tábor in the Czech Republic. He also won the overall U23 World Cup, having finished 3rd in the three other races. He finished 9th in the Duinencross Koksijde, an elite World Cup race, and was third in the Dutch cyclocross championships, and first of the U23 riders.

== Major results ==
=== Cyclo-cross ===
2017–2018
3rd Overall UCI Junior World Cup

1st Nommay
2nd Bogense
3rd Hoogerheide
3rd Zeven

2nd National Junior Championships
Junior Soudal Classics

2nd Sint-Niklaas

2019–2020
2nd National Under-23 Championships
3rd UCI World Under-23 Championships
2021–2022
1st Overall UCI Under-23 World Cup

1st Tábor
3rd Namur
3rd Dendermonde
3rd Flamanville

Under-23 X²O Badkamers Trophy

2nd Loenhout
2nd Lille
3rd Brussels

3rd National Championships
3rd Ardooie
2023–2024
3rd Rucphen
