= 2015–16 UCI Cyclo-cross World Cup =

Bicycle racing competition

2015–2016 UCI Cyclo-cross World Cup
Details
- Dates: 16 September 2015 – 24 January 2016
- Location: United States & Europe
- Races: 7

Champions
- Male individual champion: Wout Van Aert (BEL)
- Female individual champion: Sanne Cant (BEL)

The 2015–2016 UCI Cyclo-cross World Cup events and season-long competition will take place between 16 September 2015 and 24 January 2016, organised by the Union Cycliste Internationale (UCI). With CrossVegas, this season featured the first World Cup cross outside Europe.

Defending champions are Kevin Pauwels in the men's competition and Sanne Cant in the women's competition.

== Points distribution ==
Points are awarded to all eligible riders each race. The top ten finishers receive points according to the following table:

Points distribution
| Position | 1 | 2 | 3 | 4 | 5 | 6 | 7 | 8 | 9 | 10 |
| Points | 80 | 70 | 65 | 60 | 55 | 50 | 48 | 46 | 44 | 42 |

Riders finishing in positions 11 to 50 also receive points, going down from 40 points for place 11 by one point per place to 1 point for 50th place.

== Events ==
In comparison to last season's six races, this season had seven. Milton Keynes was taken out of the programme – while Las Vegas and Lignières-en-Berry were added .

| Date | Venue | Country | Elite men's winner | Elite women's winner |
|---|---|---|---|---|
| 16 September | Las Vegas | United States | Wout Van Aert (BEL) | Kateřina Nash (CZE) |
| 18 October | Valkenburg | Netherlands | Lars Van der Haar (NED) | Eva Lechner (ITA) |
| 22 November | Koksijde | Belgium | Sven Nys (BEL) | Sanne Cant (BEL) |
| 20 December | Namur | Belgium | Mathieu Van der Poel (NED) | Nikki Harris (GBR) |
| 26 December | Heusden-Zolder | Belgium | Mathieu Van der Poel (NED) | Sanne Cant (BEL) |
| 17 January | Lignières-en-Berry | France | Mathieu Van der Poel (NED) | Sanne Cant (BEL) |
| 24 January | Hoogerheide | Netherlands | Mathieu Van der Poel (NED) | Sophie De Boer (NED) |

== Individual standings ==
=== Men ===
| Rank | Name | Points |
|---|---|---|
| 1 | Wout Van Aert (BEL) | 476 |
| 2 | Lars van der Haar (NED) | 433 |
| 3 | Kevin Pauwels (BEL) | 421 |
| 4 | Sven Nys (BEL) | 389 |
| 5 | Mathieu van der Poel (NED) | 385 |
| 6 | Laurens Sweeck (BEL) | 331 |
| 7 | Tom Meeusen (BEL) | 321 |
| 8 | Toon Aerts (BEL) | 284 |
| 9 | Klaas Vantornout (BEL) | 265 |
| 10 | Gianni Vermeersch (BEL) | 259 |

=== Women ===
| Rank | Name | Points |
|---|---|---|
| 1 | Sanne Cant (BEL) | 317 |
| 2 | Eva Lechner (ITA) | 276 |
| 3 | Nikki Harris (GBR) | 229 |
| 4 | Ellen Van Loy (BEL) | 225 |
| 5 | Katie Compton (USA) | 192 |
| 6 | Sophie de Boer (NED) | 185 |
| 7 | Caroline Mani (FRA) | 181 |
| 8 | Pavla Havlíková (CZE) | 175 |
| 9 | Helen Wyman (GBR) | 174 |
| 10 | Kaitlin Antonneau (USA) | 154 |
