= 2011 UCI Cyclo-cross World Championships =

Cyclo-cross championship

- Venue: Sankt Wendel, Germany
- Date: 29–30 January 2011
- Coordinates: 49°28′N 7°10′E
- Events: 4

The 2011 UCI Cyclo-cross World Championships took place in Sankt Wendel, Germany on the weekend of January 29 and 30, 2011. As in the previous years, four events were scheduled.

A lap on the track is 2.8 km long with 40% uphill, 25% descents, 35% plain, including some steps and some obstacles. 85% of the track is natural underground, the rest being asphalt.

== Schedule ==
- Saturday, 29 January 2011:
  - 11h00 Men's Junior
  - 14h00 Men's Under-23
- Sunday, 30 January 2011:
  - 11h00 Women's Elite
  - 14h00 Men's Elite

== Medal table ==
Rank	Nation	Gold	Silver	Bronze	Total
1	Netherlands (NED)	2	1	0	3
2	France (FRA)	1	1	1	3
3	Czech Republic (CZE)	1	0	2	3
4	Belgium (BEL)	0	1	1	2
5	United States (USA)	0	1	0	1
Totals (5 entries)		4	4	4	12

== Medal summary ==
Event	Gold		Silver		Bronze	
Men's events
Men's elite race	Zdeněk Štybar; Czech Republic	1h 06'37"	Sven Nys; Belgium	+ 18"	Kevin Pauwels; Belgium	+ 1'15"
Men's under-23 race	Lars Van der Haar; Netherlands	52'01"	Mike Teunissen; Netherlands	+ 1"	Karel Hnik; Czech Republic	s.t.
Men's junior race	Clément Venturini; France	44'31"	Fabien Doubey; France	+ 15"	Loïc Doubey; France	s.t.
Women's events
Women's elite race	Marianne Vos; Netherlands	40'31"	Katie Compton; United States	+ 17"	Kateřina Nash; Czech Republic	+ 20"
