= Cannondale–Cyclocrossworld.com =

Professional Cyclocross team

Team information
- UCI code: CCW
- Registered: United States
- Founded: 2005
- Discipline: Cyclocross
- Status: American Cyclocross Team
- Bicycles: Cannondale

Key personnel
- Team manager: Stu Thorne

Team name history
- 2005 2007 2006-2009 2010 2015: Cyclocrossworld.com/Louis Garneau; Cannondale/Leer/Cyclocrossworld.com; Cannondale/Cyclocrossworld.com; Cannondale prepared by Cyclocrossworld.com; Cannondale p/b Cyclocrossworld.com

Cannondale–Cyclocrossworld.com is a professional Cyclocross team based and registered in the United States. The team is sponsored by American bicycle manufacturer Cannondale and cyclocross equipment retailer Cyclocrossworld.com. The team is managed and directed by Stu Thorne. With the retirement of veteran racer Tim Johnson after the 2014 season, the team returned for the 2015 season headed by returning riders, Ryan Trebon, Curtis White, and Kaitlin Antonneau. Stephen Hyde was added to the 2015 roster after completing his second season on the road with the Astellas Professional Cycling Team.

The 2016 Cannondale p/b Cyclocrossworld.com roster was announced on July 2, 2016. It features the return of Curtis White, Kaitlin Antonneau and Stephen Hyde while Emma White, Curtis' younger sister and a former member of the development team, will round out the roster. Ryan Trebon will not be returning for the 2016 season.

Cannondale/Cyclocrossworld.com has been among the most successful teams in American cyclocross over the past decade. The team collected 22 wins in 2009, adding to the litany of wins the team has collected over the years. Managing Director Stu Thorne founded and supports the squad, which first arrived on the American cyclocross scene with a strong performance from Johnson in the 2005 season. Over the course of their history, team riders have won two national titles and have collected a number of wins in the United States Gran Prix of Cyclocross and the North American Cyclocross Trophy. Former riders include Jamey Driscoll, Tim Johnson and his wife and former Canadian Cyclocross Champion, Lyne Bessette.

== 2016 Team ==
Rider	Date of birth
Emma White (USA)	August 23, 1997 (age 29)
Curtis White (USA)	September 28, 1995 (age 30)
Kaitlin Antonneau (USA)	January 1, 1992 (age 34)
Stephen Hyde (USA)	March 10, 1987 (age 39)

== 2010 Major Results ==
- (U23 Women) 1st United States Cyclo-cross National Championships - Bend, OR
- 3rd United States Cyclo-cross National Championships - Bend, OR
- 4th United States Cyclo-cross National Championships - Bend, OR
- 5th United States Cyclo-cross National Championships - Bend, OR
- 1st Overall, US Gran Prix of Cyclocross
- 2nd Overall, US Gran Prix of Cyclocross
  - 1st USGP #8 - Portland Cup #2 Portland, OR
  - 1st USGP #7 - Portland Cup #1 Portland, OR
  - 1st USGP #6 - New Belgium Cup #2 Fort Collins, CO
  - 1st USGP #4 - Derby City Cup #2 Louisville, KY
  - 1st USGP #3 - Derby City Cup #1 Louisville, KY
  - 1st USGP #2 - Planet Bike Cup #2 Sun Prairie, WI
  - 1st USGP #1 - Planet Bike Cup #1 Sun Prairie, WI
  - 2nd USGP #8 - Portland Cup #2 Portland, OR
  - 2nd USGP #6 - New Belgium Cup #2 Fort Collins, CO
  - 2nd USGP #5 - New Belgium Cup #1 Fort Collins, CO
  - 2nd USGP #2 - Planet Bike Cup #2 Sun Prairie, WI
  - 2nd USGP #1 - Planet Bike Cup #1 Sun Prairie, WI
  - 3rd USGP #7 - Portland Cup #1 Portland, OR
  - 3rd USGP #4 - Derby City Cup #2 Louisville, KY
  - 3rd USGP #3 - Derby City Cup #1 Louisville, KY
- 1st Overall, North American Cyclocross Trophy
  - 1st NACT #8 - Baystate Cyclocross #2 Sterling, MA
  - 1st NACT #7 - Baystate Cyclocross #1 Sterling, MA
  - 1st NACT #6 - Boulder Cup, Boulder, CO
  - 1st NACT #5 - Colorado Cross Classic, Boulder, CO
  - 1st NACT #4 - Gran Prix of Gloucester #2 - Gloucester, MA
  - 1st NACT #3 - Gran Prix of Gloucester #1 - Gloucester, MA
  - 2nd NACT #5 - Colorado Cross Classic, Boulder, CO
  - 2nd NACT #4 - Gran Prix of Gloucester #2 - Gloucester, MA
  - 2nd NACT #3 - Gran Prix of Gloucester #1 - Gloucester, MA
  - 3rd NACT #6 - Boulder Cup, Boulder, CO
  - 3rd NACT #4 - Gran Prix of Gloucester #2 - Gloucester, MA
- Verge New England Cyclocross Championship
  - 1st NECCS #2 - Green Mountain Cyclocross #2 Williston, VT
  - 1st NECCS #1 - Green Mountain Cyclocross #1 Williston, VT
- 1st Jingle Cross Rock #3 Iowa City, Iowa
- 1st Jingle Cross Rock #1 Iowa City, Iowa
- 1st Providence Cyclocross Festival #2 Providence, RI
- 1st Providence Cyclocross Festival #1 Providence, RI
- 1st Dark Horse Cyclo-Stampede Covington, KY
- 1st Lionhearts International Cyclocross Middletown, OH
- 1st Bio Wheels / United Dairy Farmers Harbin Park International Cincinnati, OH
- 2nd Cross Vegas Las Vegas, NV
- 2nd Providence Cyclocross Festival #1 Providence, RI
- 3rd Bio Wheels / United Dairy Farmers Harbin Park International Cincinnati, OH

== 2009 Major Results ==
- 1st United States Cyclocross National Championships - Bend, OR
- 5th United States Cyclocross National Championships - Bend, OR
- 2nd Overall, US Gran Prix of Cyclocross
- 3rd Overall, US Gran Prix of Cyclocross
  - 1st USGP #8 - Portland Cup #2 Portland, OR
  - 1st USGP #6 - Mercer Cup West #2 Windsor, NJ
  - 1st USGP #4 - Derby City Cup #2 Louisville, KY
  - 1st USGP #1 - Planet Bike Cup #1 Sun Prairie, WI
  - 2nd USGP #7 - Portland Cup #1 Portland, OR
  - 2nd USGP #5 - Mercer Cup #1 West Windsor, NJ
  - 2nd USGP #4 - Derby City Cup #2 Louisville, KY
  - 2nd USGP #3 - Derby City Cup #1 Louisville, KY
  - 3rd USGP #7 - Portland Cup #1 Portland, OR
  - 3rd USGP #5 - Mercer Cup #1 West Windsor, NJ
  - 3rd USGP #4 - Derby City Cup #2 Louisville, KY
  - 3rd USGP #3 - Derby City Cup #1 Louisville, KY
- 1st Overall, North American Cyclocross Trophy
- 2nd Overall, North American Cyclocross Trophy
- 3rd Overall, North American Cyclocross Trophy
  - 1st NACT #10 - Whitmore's Super Cross Cup #2 Southampton, NY
  - 1st NACT #9 - Whimtore's Super Cross Cup #1 Southampton, NY
  - 1st NACT #8 - Boulder Cup Boulder, CO
  - 1st NACT #7 - Blue Sky Velo Cup Longmont, CO
  - 1st NACT #6 - Toronto International Cyclocross #2 Toronto, ON
  - 1st NACT #5 - Toronto International Cyclocross #1 Toronto, ON
  - 1st NACT #4 - Gran Prix of Gloucester #2 Gloucester, MA
  - 2nd NACT #10 - Whitmore's Super Cross Cup #2 Southampton, NY
  - 2nd NACT #9 - Whimtore's Super Cross Cup #1 Southampton, NY
  - 2nd NACT #8 - Boulder Cup Boulder, CO
  - 2nd NACT #7 - Blue Sky Velo Cup Longmont, CO
  - 2nd NACT #6 - Toronto International Cyclocross #2 Toronto, ON
  - 2nd NACT #5 - Toronto International Cyclocross #1 Toronto, ON
  - 2nd NACT #3 - Gran Prix of Gloucester #1 Gloucester, MA
  - 2nd NACT #1 - Star-Crossed Redmond, WA
  - 3rd NACT #10 - Whitmore's Super Cross Cup #2 Southampton, NY
  - 3rd NACT #9 - Whimtore's Super Cross Cup #1 Southampton, NY
  - 3rd NACT #8 - Boulder Cup Boulder, CO
  - 3rd NACT #7 - Blue Sky Velo Cup Longmont, CO
  - 3rd NACT #6 - Toronto International Cyclocross #2 Toronto, ON
  - 3rd NACT #5 - Toronto International Cyclocross #1 Toronto, ON
  - 3rd NACT #3 - Gran Prix of Gloucester #2 Gloucester, MA
  - 3rd NACT #2 - Rad Racing Gran Prix Lakewood, WA
- Verge New England Cyclocross Championship
  - 1st NECCS #12 - Baystate Cyclocross #2 Sterling, MA
  - 1st NECCS #11 - Baystate Cyclocross #1 Sterling, MA
  - 1st NECCS #10 - Cycle-Smart International #2 Northampton, MA
  - 1st NECCS #9 - Cycle-Smart International #1 Northampton, MA
  - 1st NECCS #6 - Providence Cyclocross Festival #2 Providence, RI
  - 1st NECCS #5 - Providence Cyclocross Festival #1 Providence, RI
  - 2nd NECCS #9 - Cycle-Smart International #1 Northampton, MA
  - 2nd NECCS #6 - Providence Cyclocross Festival #2 Providence, RI
  - 2nd NECCS #5 - Providence Cyclocross Festival #1 Providence, RI
- 1st Cross Vegas Las Vegas, NV
- 1st Dark Horse Cyclo-Stampede Covington, KY
- 1st Lionhearts International Cyclocross Middletown, OH
- 1st Bio Wheels / United Dairy Farmers Harbin Park International Cincinnati, OH
