= Saint Nicholas Church, Bogense =

Coordinates: 55.5674°N 10.0875°E

Saint Nicholas Church
- Bogense Kirke
- Sankt Nicolaj Kirke
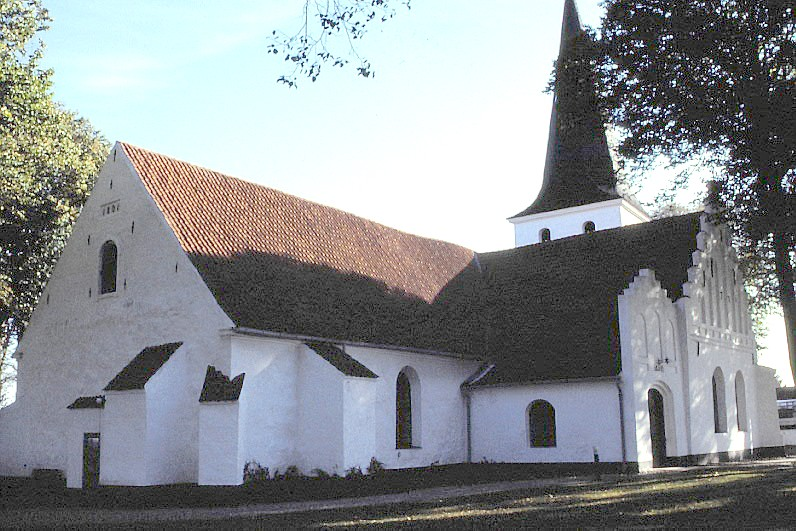
- Saint Nicholas Church
- Location: Bogense, Denmark
- Denomination: Church of Denmark
- Website: http://www.bogensekirke.dk/

Architecture
- Completed: c. 1450

Administration
- Diocese: Diocese of Funen
- Parish: Bogense Sogn

Saint Nicholas Church (Danish: Sankt Nikolaj Kirke), also Bogense Church, is located in the harbour town of Bogense on the Danish island of Funen. It was built in 1406 on the remains of a 12th-century Romanesque church. In the mid-15th century, various additions were made including the tower which unusually is at the east end of the church. The tall spire served as a landmark for shipping. Comprehensive restoration work was completed in 2010. Artefacts include a 16th-century altar (1588), a 13th-century baptismal font, and a carved pulpit from 1604.
