= List of boroughs in Denmark =

The oldest commercial centers in present day Denmark was annual gatherings that eventually grew to form cities. With the establishment of a civic administration these cities received charters (typically from the king) but many of these were lost in time, so that the oldest known privileges tend to be younger than the actual date of the chartered borough.

Boroughs known to have had a charter before the introduction of the first urban law of 1422:

- Bogense (1288)
- Ebeltoft (1301)
- Fåborg (1251)
- Haderslev (1292)
- Herrested (1258 - later recalled)
- Hjørring (1243)
- Horsens (1317)
- Kerteminde (1413)
- Kolding (1321)
- København (1254)
- Køge (1288)
- Nakskov (1266)
- Nyborg (1292)
- Nysted (1409)
- Odense (1335)
- Præstø (1403)
- Randers (1302)
- Ribe (1214)
- Roskilde (1268)
- Rudkøbing (1287)
- Sakskøbing (1306)
- Skagen (1413)
- Skive, Denmark (1326)
- Skælskør (1414)
- Slagelse (1288)
- Slangerup (1301 - later recalled)
- Stubbekøbing (1354)
- Svendborg (1253)
- Tønder (1243)
- Vejle (1326)
- Vordingborg (1415)
- Åbenrå (1335)
- Åkirkeby (1346)
- Ålborg (1342)

All of these dates are the latest possible for the charter and many of them are known to be renewals. Furthermore, the following boroughs are of Medieval origin but there exists no charter handed down from before 1422:

- Allinge-Sandvig
- Assens (1510)
- Borre (1460)
- Grenå (1440)
- Hasle
- Helsingør (1426)
- Hillerød
- Hobro
- Holbæk
- Holstebro
- Kalundborg (1443)
- Korsør (1425)
- Lemvig
- Maribo (1488)
- Middelfart (1496)
- Nexø
- Nibe (1518)
- Nykøbing Falster (1451)
- Nykøbing Mors
- Nykøbing Sjælland (1443)
- Næstved
- Ringkøbing (1443)
- Ringsted
- Rødby (1454)
- Rønne (1490)
- Skibby (later recalled)
- Stege
- Stigs Bjergby
- Store Heddinge (1441)
- Svaneke
- Sæby
- Søborg (later recalled)
- Varde (1442)
- Viborg
- Sønderborg (1461)
- Ærøskøbing
- Århus (1441]

Later additions until the introduction of constitutional Monarchy in 1849:

- Christianshavn (later recalled)
- Fredericia
- Frederikshavn
- Frederikssund
- Hørsholm (later recalled)
- Mariager
- Gammel Ry (later recalled)
- Thisted

Modern additions until the abolishment of chartered boroughs in 1970:

- Brønderslev
- Esbjerg
- Frederiksværk
- Herning
- Nørresundby
- Silkeborg
- Skjern
- Struer
