= 2018–19 UCI Cyclo-cross World Cup =

Bicycle racing competition

Details
- Location: Belgium; Czech Republic; France; Netherlands; Switzerland; United States
- Races: 9

Champions
- Male individual champion: Toon Aerts (BEL) (Telenet–Fidea Lions)
- Female individual champion: Marianne Vos (NED) (WaowDeals Pro Cycling & CCC - Liv (Note: In the 2018 races, Vos rode for WaowDeals Pro Cycling, and for CCC - Liv in the 2019 races.))

The 2018–19 Telenet UCI Cyclo-cross World Cup was a season long cyclo-cross competition, organised by the Union Cycliste Internationale (UCI). The UCI Cyclo-cross World Cup took place between 23 September 2018 and 27 January 2019, over a total of nine events. The defending champions were Mathieu van der Poel in the men's competition and Sanne Cant in the women's competition.

Three of the five titles were secured at the penultimate round in France; with her fourth race victory, seven-time world champion Marianne Vos clinched her first World Cup title, leaving the round 132 points clear of her next closest competitor, compatriot Annemarie Worst. With his fourth win in five starts, British rider Tom Pidcock took the under-23 men's title for the second consecutive season – sealing a maximum possible points tally of 240 – while a second-place finish was enough for Belgium's Witse Meeussen to claim the junior men's title.

At the final event in the Netherlands, home rider Ceylin del Carmen Alvarado sealed the women's under-23 ranking victory, finishing in seventh place overall in the elite standings. The back-and-forth battle between Belgians Toon Aerts and Wout van Aert in the elite men standings was decided in the favour of Aerts – with 615 points, to van Aert's 613; the two riders took three victories between them as van der Poel won all six races he started in the World Cup season, finishing third overall.

== Points distribution ==
Points were awarded to all eligible riders each race. The top ten finishers received points according to the following table:

Points awarded
Position	1	2	3	4	5	6	7	8	9	10
Elite riders (Note: Women's under-23 riders were awarded points on the elite scale, as all women competed within the same race. Two jerseys were awarded; one for the leading elite woman and one for the leading under-23 woman.)	80	70	65	60	55	50	48	46	44	42
U23/Junior riders	60	50	45	40	35	30	28	26	24	22

- Elite riders finishing in positions 11 to 50 also received points, going down from 40 points for 11th place by one point per place to 1 point for 50th place.
- For the age group riders (excluding under-23 women), those finishing in positions 11 to 30 also received points, going down from 20 points for 11th place by one point per place to 1 point for 30th place. As well as this, only the top four scores for each rider count towards the World Cup standings.

== Events ==
In comparison to last season, the races in Bogense, Nommay and Zeven were replaced by Bern, Pontchâteau and Tábor. The race in Bern will be the first Cyclo-cross World Cup race in Switzerland since the 2010–11 season.

Date	Race	Location	Winners			
Date	Race	Location	Elite men	Elite women	Under-23 men	Junior men
24 September	World Cup Waterloo	Waterloo, United States	Toon Aerts (BEL)	Marianne Vos (NED)	No under-23 or junior race	
29 September	Jingle Cross	Iowa City, United States	Toon Aerts (BEL)	Kaitlin Keough (USA)	No under-23 or junior race	
21 October	Cyclo-cross Bern	Bern, Switzerland	Mathieu van der Poel (NED)	Marianne Vos (NED)	Eli Iserbyt (BEL)	Witse Meeussen (BEL)
17 November	Cyklokros Tábor	Tábor, Czech Republic	Mathieu van der Poel (NED)	Lucinda Brand (NED)	Tom Pidcock (GBR)	Witse Meeussen (BEL)
25 November	Duinencross Koksijde	Koksijde, Belgium	Mathieu van der Poel (NED)	Denise Betsema (NED)	Tom Pidcock (GBR)	Pim Ronhaar (NED)
23 December	Citadelcross	Namur, Belgium	Mathieu van der Poel (NED)	Lucinda Brand (NED)	Tom Pidcock (GBR)	Ryan Cortjens (BEL)
26 December	Grand Prix Eric De Vlaeminck	Heusden-Zolder, Belgium	Mathieu van der Poel (NED)	Marianne Vos (NED)	Eli Iserbyt (BEL)	Ryan Cortjens (BEL)
20 January	Cyclo-cross Pontchâteau	Pontchâteau, France	Wout van Aert (BEL)	Marianne Vos (NED)	Tom Pidcock (GBR)	Thibau Nys (BEL)
27 January	Grand Prix Adrie van der Poel	Hoogerheide, Netherlands	Mathieu van der Poel (NED)	Lucinda Brand (NED)	Eli Iserbyt (BEL)	Witse Meeussen (BEL)

== Final points standings ==
=== Elite men ===
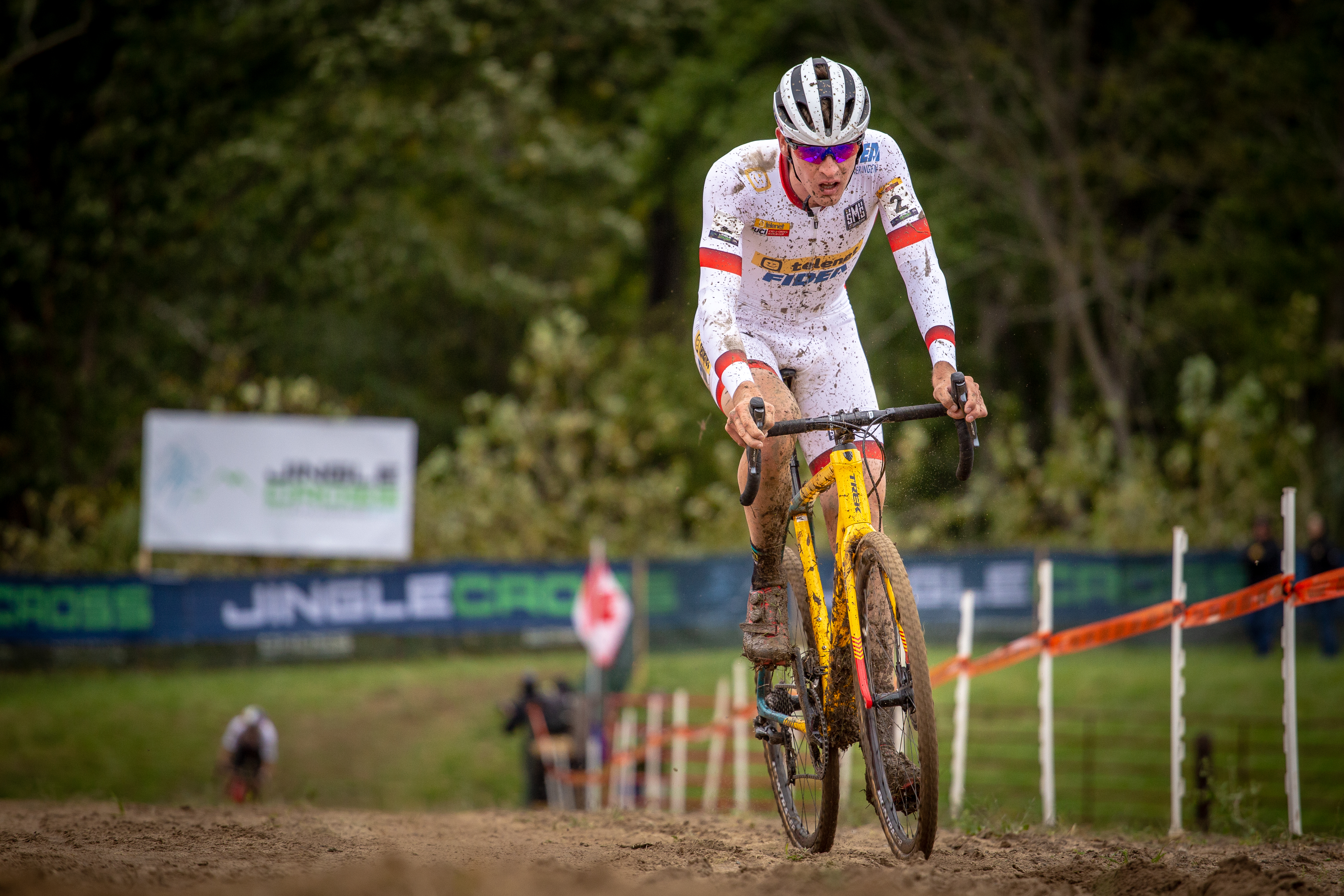
Toon Aerts (pictured at the Jingle Cross), the winner of the men's World Cup standings for the first time.

Pos.	Rider	WAT (United States)	JIN (United States)	BER (Switzerland)	TAB (Czech Republic)	KOK (Belgium)	NAM (Belgium)	ZOL (Belgium)	PON (France)	HOO (Netherlands)	Points
1	Toon Aerts (BEL)	1	1	3	4	3	3	4	2	2	615
2	Wout van Aert (BEL)	2	2	2	7	2	2	2	1	3	613
3	Mathieu van der Poel (NED)			1	1	1	1	1		1	480
4	Corné van Kessel (NED)	6	5	7	12	5	6	9	9	4	445
5	Quinten Hermans (BEL)	4	4	5	5	17	13	6	13	7	438
6	Lars van der Haar (NED)	18	11	9	3	4	10	8	4	8	436
7	Laurens Sweeck (BEL)	3	9	18	9	6	8	5	6	13	425
8	Michael Vanthourenhout (BEL)	Ret	3	4	2	8	5	13	3	DNS	399
9	Daan Soete (BEL)	5	10	6	10	7	14	10	17	25	376
10	Kevin Pauwels (BEL)	12	7	16	6	10	12	15	8	19	367
104 riders scored points

=== Elite women ===
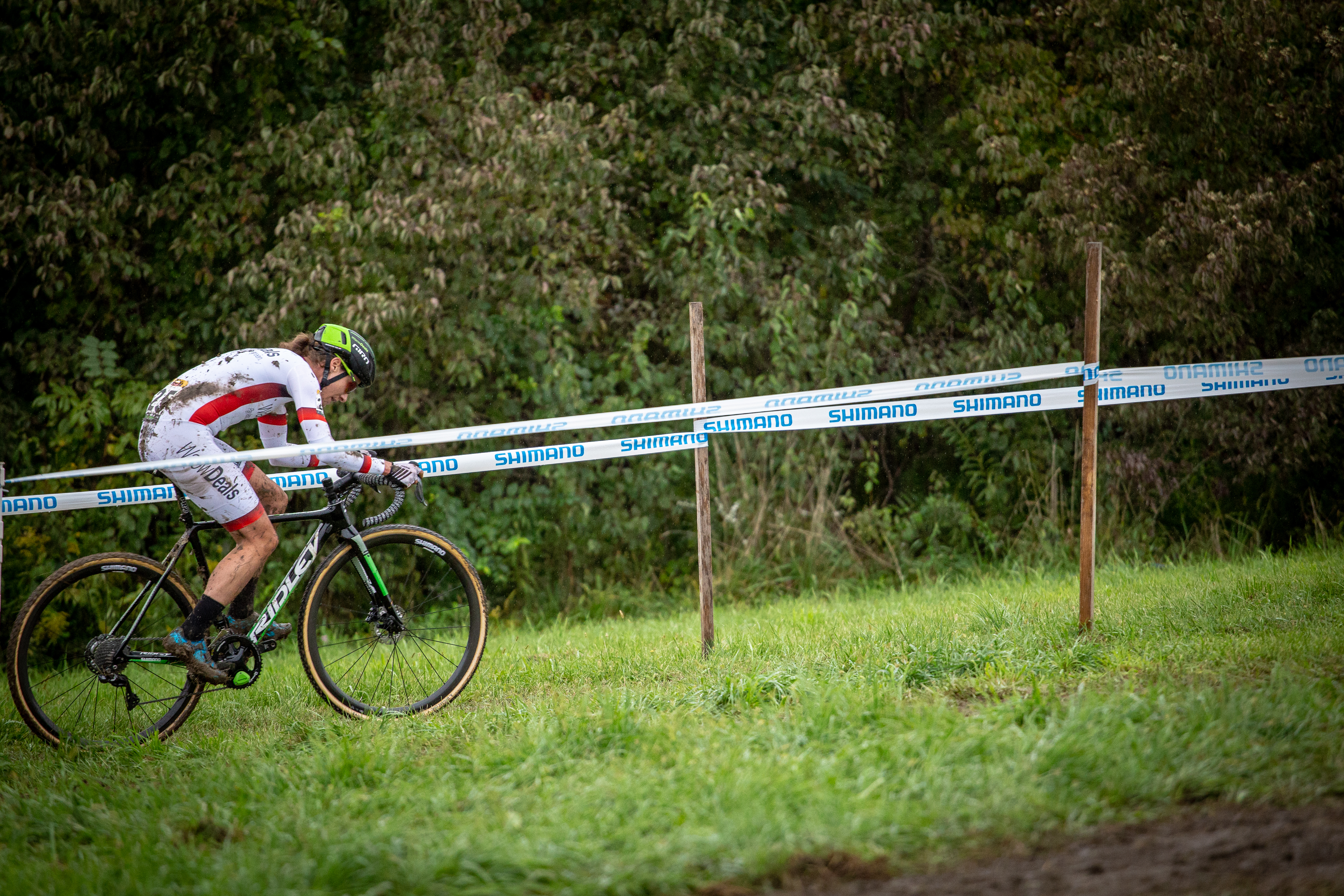
Marianne Vos (pictured at the Jingle Cross), the winner of the women's World Cup standings for the first time.

Pos.	Rider	WAT (United States)	JIN (United States)	BER (Switzerland)	TAB (Czech Republic)	KOK (Belgium)	NAM (Belgium)	ZOL (Belgium)	PON (France)	HOO (Netherlands)	Points
1	Marianne Vos (NED)	1	3	1		12	2	1	1	3	559
2	Sanne Cant (BEL)	10	5	4	6	7	13	3		4	418
3	Annemarie Worst (NED)			2	2	3	3	9	7	13	400
4	Kaitlin Keough (USA)	19	1	10	21	21	8	17	11	6	384
5	Denise Betsema (NED)			13	5	1	7	12	2	7	378
6	Loes Sels (BEL)	5	10	17	25	11	10	6	19	8	367
7	Ceylin del Carmen Alvarado (NED)			5	7	4	9	4	4	21	357
8	Katie Compton (USA)	Ret	15	3	11	13	31	13	10	2	349
9	Eva Lechner (ITA)	16	6	9	19	27	6	10	15	16	348
10	Ellen Van Loy (BEL)	6	11	7	4	8	DNS	29	5	25	347
127 total riders (Note: This tally included 59 under-23 riders, which the UCI awarded a separate jersey for.) scored points

=== Under-23 men ===
Pos.	Rider	BER (Switzerland)	TAB (Czech Republic)	KOK (Belgium)	NAM (Belgium)	ZOL (Belgium)	PON (France)	HOO (Netherlands)	Points
1	Tom Pidcock (GBR)	(4)	1	1	1		1		240
2	Eli Iserbyt (BEL)	1	(DNS)	(8)	3	1	(5)	1	225
3	Antoine Benoist (FRA)	(3)	3	2	(4)		2	2	195
4	Jakob Dorigoni (ITA)	(12)	2	(15)	2	(6)	3	4	185
5	Eddy Finé (FRA)	2	10	(12)	5	(20)	8	(17)	133
6	Niels Vandeputte (BEL)	8	4	7	(34)	(14)		5	129
7	Maik van der Heijden (NED)	5	14	(DSQ)	(24)	2	10	(22)	124
8	Ben Turner (GBR)			4	9	27		3	113
9	Lander Loockx (BEL)	7	7	(Ret)	(14)	(10)	9	8	106
10	Loris Rouiller (SUI)	(22)	11	(22)	7	8		6	104
69 riders scored points

=== Under-23 women ===
Pos.	Rider	WAT (United States)	JIN (United States)	BER (Switzerland)	TAB (Czech Republic)	KOK (Belgium)	NAM (Belgium)	ZOL (Belgium)	PON (France)	HOO (Netherlands)	Points
1	Ceylin del Carmen Alvarado (NED)			5	7	4	9	4	4	21	357
2	Fleur Nagengast (NED)	11	17	26	14	10	16	15	8	23	323
3	Inge van der Heijden (NED)	9	20	27	17	17	27	8	9	31	301
4	Manon Bakker (NED)	23	30	16	29	33	30	24	20	35	219
5	Evie Richards (GBR)	4	2		15	9	DNS	DNS			210
6	Clara Honsinger (USA)	14	19		28	32			23	19	171
7	Marion Norbert-Riberolle (FRA)			30	30	37	19	18	30	28	165
8	Jana Czeczinkarová (CZE)			34	16		28	14	DNS	50	113
9	Marthe Truyen (BEL)			32	35	30		35	22	40	112
10	Nicole Koller (SUI)			22			22	20			89
59 riders scored points

=== Junior men ===
Pos.	Rider	BER (Switzerland)	TAB (Czech Republic)	KOK (Belgium)	NAM (Belgium)	ZOL (Belgium)	PON (France)	HOO (Netherlands)	Points
1	Witse Meeussen (BEL)	1	1	(2)	(3)	(7)	2	1	230
2	Ryan Cortjens (BEL)	(25)	(26)	10	1	1	(29)	4	182
3	Thibau Nys (BEL)	(18)	2	7	(17)	4	1	(Ret)	178
4	Luke Verburg (NED)	2	(21)	(20)	7	2	5	(12)	163
5	Tom Lindner (GER)	(39)	3	3	(36)	9		5	149
6	Pim Ronhaar (NED)	10	5	1			(38)	7	145
7	Jan Zatloukal (CZE)	(23)	7		5	6		8	119
8	Wout Vervoort (BEL)	(16)	10	6	6	10			104
9	Jakub Ťoupalík (CZE)	11	4	8	(19)	16	(25)	(33)	101
10	Lennert Belmans (BEL)			17	(24)	18	7	3	100
70 riders scored points
