= Peanut Butter & Co. =

American peanut butter brand

Coordinates: 40°43′47.5″N 73°59′58.8″W

Peanut Butter & Co. is a peanut butter brand based in New York City. Founded in 1998 by Lee Zalben, from 1998 to 2016, the company operated a sandwich shop in Greenwich Village, which sold gourmet peanut butter sandwiches for $5. The company by 1999 was selling a line of peanut butter to supermarkets featuring ten "all natural" flavors and from peanuts grown by farmers in the United States. In 2005 the company published The Peanut Butter & Co. Cookbook.

== History ==
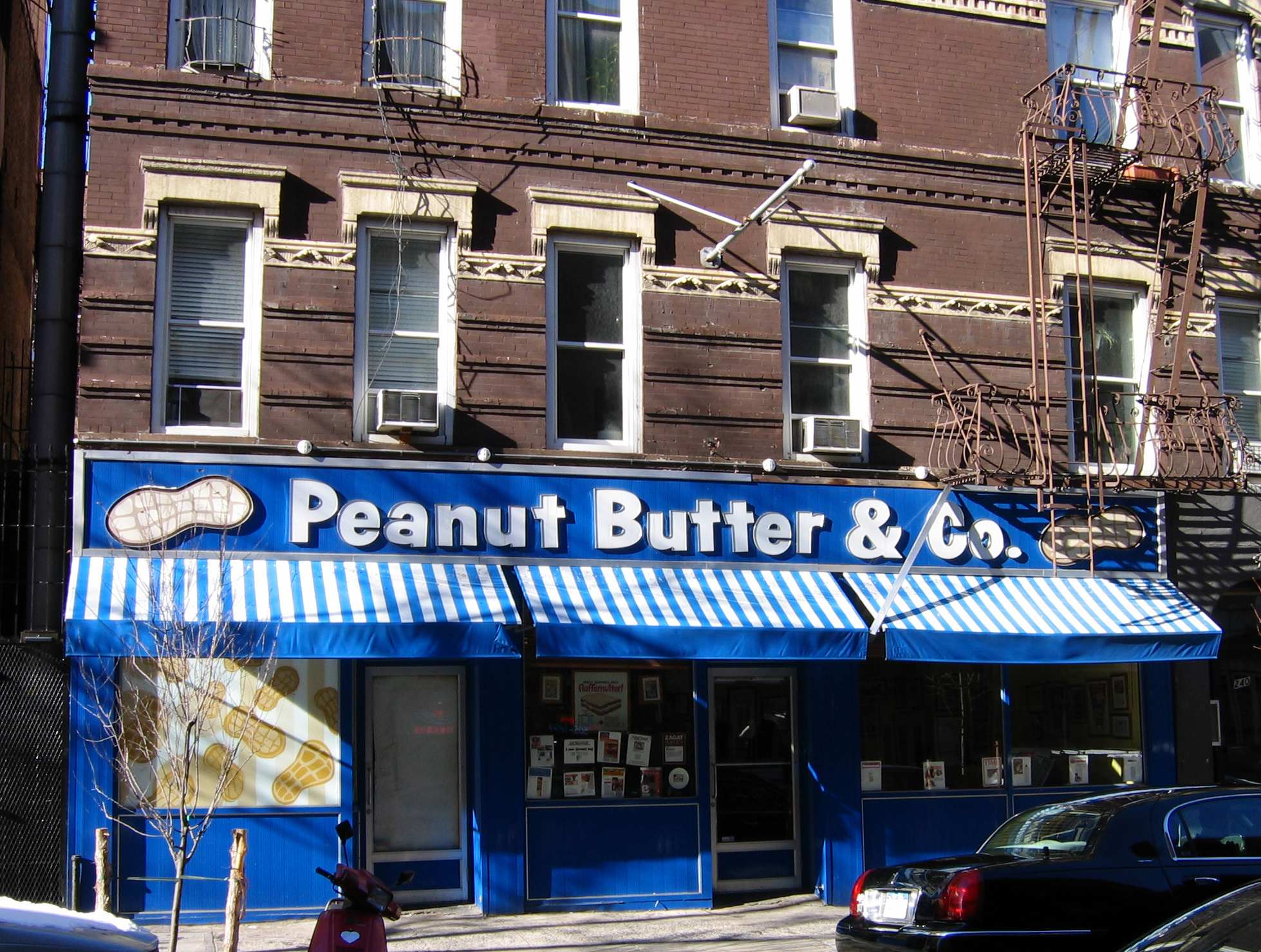
The former location of the Peanut Butter & Co. sandwich shop, near Washington Square Park.

Founder Lee Zalben graduated from Vassar College in 1995 and after a short time in the advertising and publishing industries he opened the Manhattan store on December 21, 1998. Zalben has stated that he began working with peanut butter due to a childhood love of it. From 1998 to 2016, the company operated a sandwich shop in Greenwich Village, New York City. Its menu primarily consisted of peanut butter sandwiches and other items made with peanut butter, with gourmet peanut butter sandwiches sold for $5. Each sandwich was available in a dozen varieties, with ingredients such as bacon, honey, banana, spicy peanut butter, and grilled chicken. According to Eater, it was a "single menu restaurant pioneer" for its focus on peanut butter sandwiches, and "paved the way for cutesy comfort food specialists like Rice to Riches, Insomnia Cookies, Meltshop, and Puddin' By Clio (RIP)."

In 2003, the company expanded into retail distribution, selling ten varieties in the US and Canada, at franchises including Kroger, Safeway, Target, Walmart, and Whole Foods. In 2005 the company published The Peanut Butter & Co. Cookbook, which has numerous recipes for using peanut butter. The foreword of the book was written by Jerry Seinfeld, as he'd had an item named after him: Jerry Seinfeld's Comedy Special, which was a toasted bagel with peanut butter, honey, and cinnamon. By 2010, the shop served around 100,000 people each year. Peanut Butter & Co. was the title sponsor of the Team TWENTY12 women's pro cycling team for 2011. The New York restaurant closed in 2016, although the brand remains active with a line of jarred peanut butters.

== Products ==
It sells peanut butter, spreads, powders, and snack items. By 1999 it was selling a line of peanut butter to supermarkets featuring ten "all natural" flavors and from peanuts grown by farmers in the United States. A decade later, the company also sold flavors like White Chocolate Wonderful and Cinnamon Raisin Swirl in around 15,000 supermarkets in the United States.

In 2010, the restaurant sold a lunchbox special - options for sandwiches included whole or white bread, crunchy or smooth, crusts on or off, type of preserves, etc. There were also items such as flavored milk, "ants on a log," and other "food as nostalgia" items. Each sandwich was available in a dozen varieties, with ingredients such as bacon, honey, and banana. Former sandwich items have included spicy peanut butter on The Heat is On, which also had grilled chicken and pineapple jam. Others were Et Tu Peanut Butter with romaine and anchovies, and Movie Night with M&M's and popcorn.

Several of the company's products have been praised by publications such as Men's Health.

== See also ==
- List of restaurants in New York City
