= Sophie de Boer =

Dutch cyclist (born 1990)

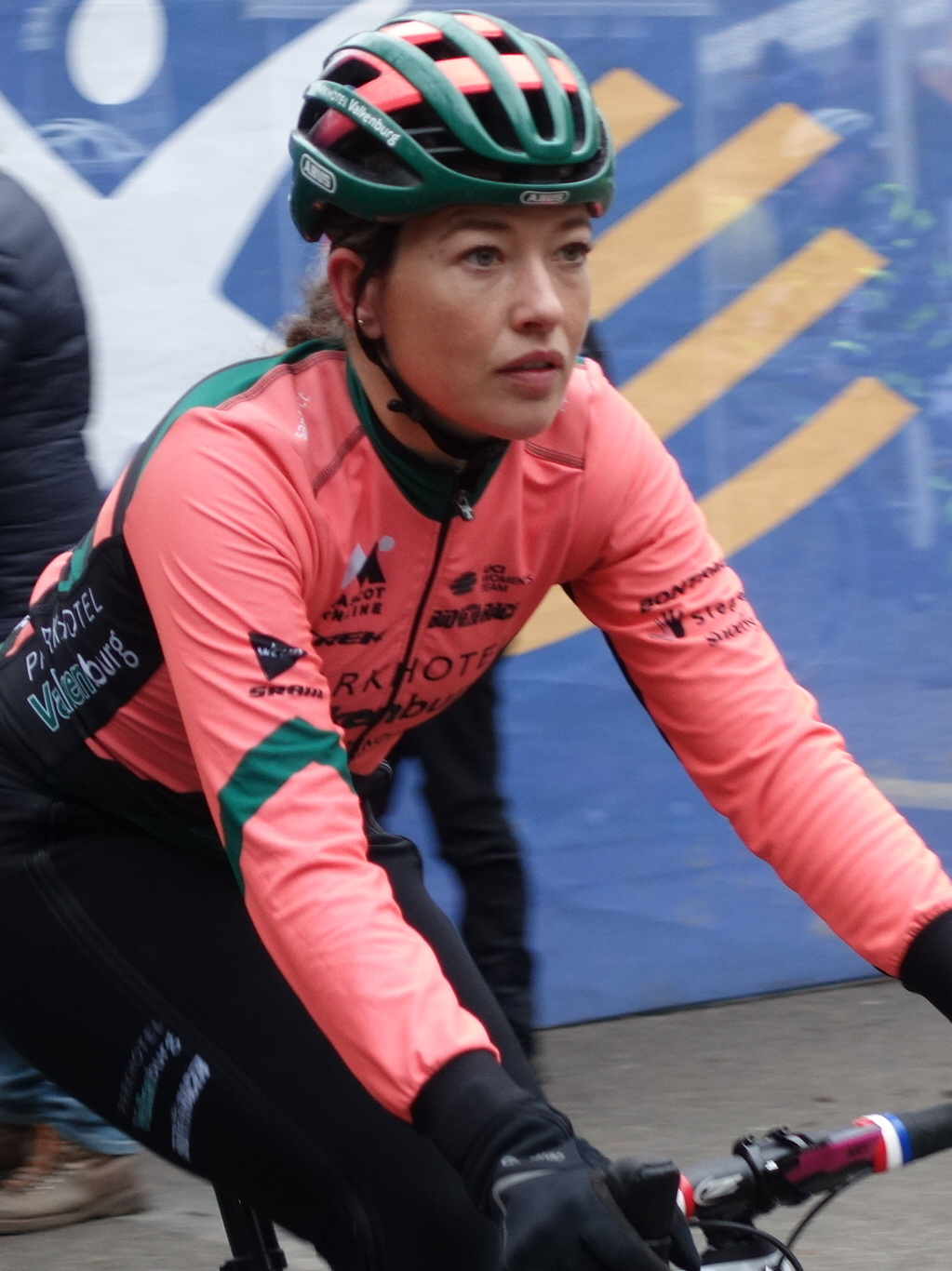
- De Boer in 2020

Personal information
- Full name: Sophie de Boer
- Born: 12 December 1990 (age 35) Drachten, Netherlands

Cycling career
- Sport: Cycling
- Disciplines: Road; Cyclo-cross
- Role: Rider

Amateur teams
- 2014–2016: Kalas–H.Essers–NNOF (cyclo-cross)
- 2017–2018: Breepark (cyclo-cross)

Professional teams
- 2010: Merida
- 2011–2013: Telenet–Fidea
- 2013–2020: Parkhotel Valkenburg Cycling Team

Major wins
- Cyclo-cross World Cup (2016–17) 2 individual wins (2015–16, 2016–17)

Sophie de Boer (born 12 December 1990) is a Dutch professional racing cyclist, who most recently rode for UCI Women's Continental Team Parkhotel Valkenburg.

== Major results ==
=== Cyclo-cross ===
2009–2010
Gazet van Antwerpen

3rd Koppenberg

2010–2011
Superprestige

3rd Gavere

Fidea Classics

3rd Niel

2011–2012
Superprestige

2nd Gavere

Gazet van Antwerpen

2nd Essen

3rd National Championships
Fidea Classics

3rd Leuven
3rd Antwerpen

2012–2013
Superprestige

2nd Ruddervoorde

2013–2014
2nd National Championships
2nd Baden
Soudal Classics

2nd Neerpelt

Superprestige

3rd Hamme

3rd Otegem
2014–2015
3rd Overall Bpost Bank Trophy

1st Ronse
1st Koppenberg
1st Essen

2nd National Championships
2nd Brabant
2nd Sint-Niklaas
2015–2016
UCI World Cup

1st Hoogerheide

Soudal Classics

1st Leuven

Superprestige

2nd Hoogstraten
2nd Middelkerke

2nd Maldegem
Bpost Bank Trophy

3rd Antwerpen

2016–2017
1st Overall UCI World Cup

1st Las Vegas
2nd Cauberg
3rd Namur
3rd Rome

Soudal Classics

1st Neerpelt
2nd Leuven

1st Overijse
1st Brabant
2nd Overall Superprestige

1st Ruddervoorde
1st Hoogstraten
2nd Middelkerke
3rd Gieten

3rd National Championships
DVV Trophy

2nd Essen
2nd Antwerpen
3rd Ronse
3rd Koppenberg

2nd Otegem
Brico Cross
3rd Maldegem
2017–2018
UCI World Cup

2nd Koksijde

Superprestige

3rd Gieten

3rd Sint-Niklaas

== See also ==
- 2014 Parkhotel Valkenburg Continental Team season
