= CrossVegas =

Cyclo-cross race in Las Vegas

CrossVegas, known in 2018 as RenoCross, was a Union Cycliste Internationale (UCI) sanctioned Cyclo-cross race that took place in Las Vegas on a Wednesday evening in September after the first full day of the Interbike trade show. In 2015 CrossVegas became the first UCI Cyclo-cross World Cup race outside Europe.

== History ==
CrossVegas started in 2007. The night-time race took place under the lights in September each year at the Desert Breeze Park, just minutes from the famous Las Vegas Strip. As the first UCI Cyclocross World Cup race of the season, the race course included many unique features not found in other cyclocross races, including a "ramp" providing a curved velodrome banking. Other course features included 4 sets of stairs, 1 set of barrier (planks), a sand pit and 2 flyovers.

In addition to the UCI elite men's and women's category races, CrossVegas had a USA Cycling race categories and a Wheelers and Dealers Race for representatives of the cycling industry.

CrossVegas saw impressive growth since its inaugural race in 2007, and each year attracted an increasingly elite field of U.S. and foreign racers as well as over 10,000 spectators. It was sponsored by Clif Bar since 2011. Despite its relatively short history, CrossVegas quickly ascended to the top of the international cyclocross racing scene and boasted the accolade of being America's biggest cyclocross race.

In 2015, the UCI designated CrossVegas the first UCI Cyclo-cross World Cup race outside Europe

== Winners ==
| Year | Men's winner | Women's winner |
|---|---|---|
| 2007 | (United States) Ryan Trebon | (United States) Lyne Bessette |
| 2008 | (United States) Ryan Trebon | (United States) Katie Compton |
| 2009 | (United States) Jamey Driscoll | (United States) Katie Compton |
| 2010 | (France) Francis Mourey | (Czech Republic) Kateřina Nash |
| 2011 | (Netherlands) Lars van der Haar | (Czech Republic) Kateřina Nash |
| 2012 | (United States) Jeremy Powers | (Netherlands) Sanne van Paassen |
| 2013 | (Belgium) Sven Nys | (Czech Republic) Kateřina Nash |
| 2014 | (Belgium) Sven Nys | (United States) Meredith Miller |
| 2015 | (Belgium) Wout Van Aert | (Czech Republic) Kateřina Nash |
| 2016 | (Belgium) Wout Van Aert | (Netherlands) Sophie De Boer |
| 2017 | (Belgium) Laurens Sweeck | (Czech Republic) Kateřina Nash |
| 2018 | (United States) Lance Haidet | (Canada) Maghalie Rochette |
