= Kaitlin Keough =

American professional racing cyclist (born 1992)

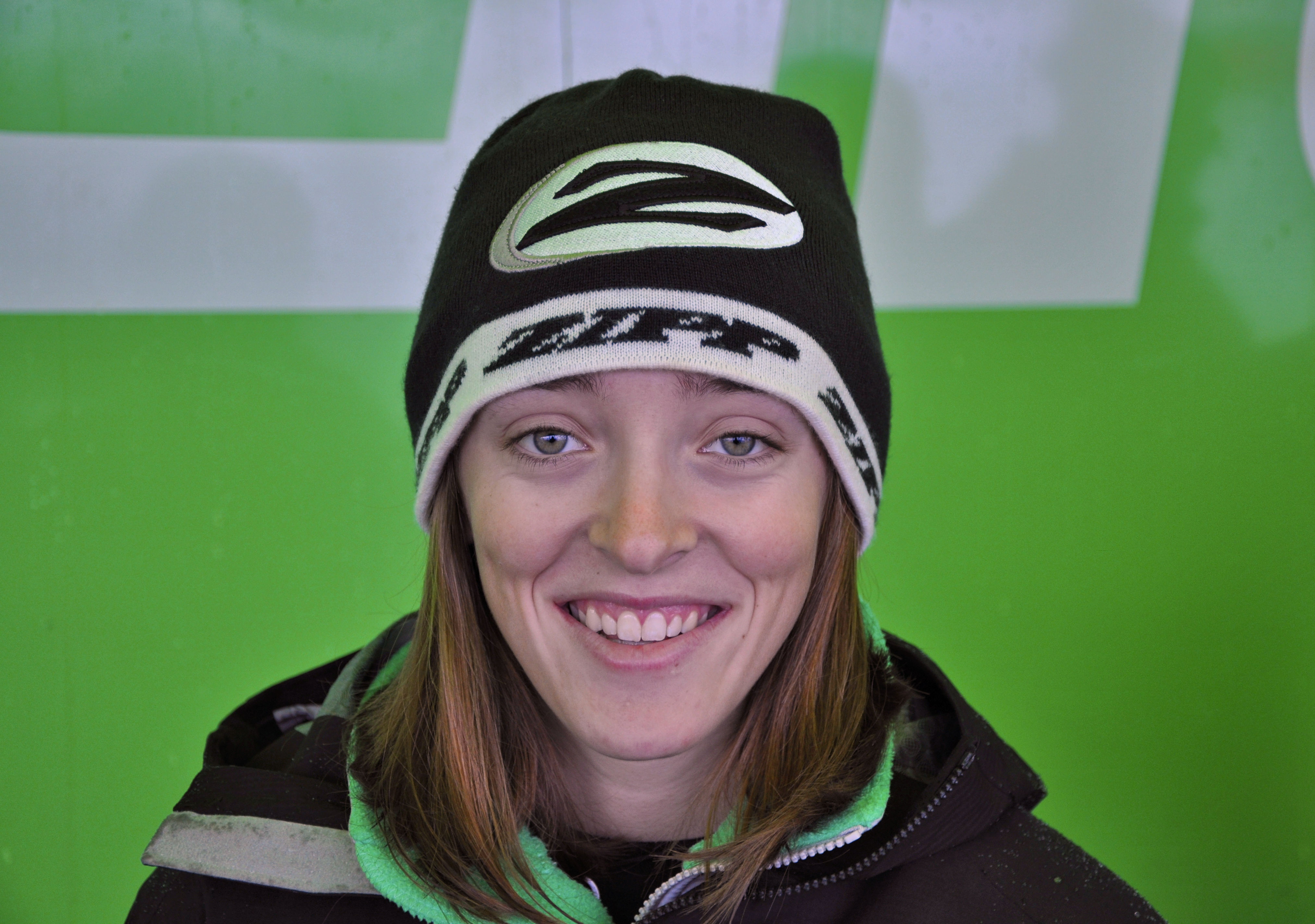

Personal information
- Full name: Kaitlin Keough (née Antonneau)
- Born: January 1, 1992 (age 34) Racine, Wisconsin, U.S.
- Height: 5 ft 2 in (1.57 m)
- Weight: 106 lb (48 kg)

Cycling career
- Sport: Cycling
- Current team: Peanut Butter & Co. Twenty12 (Road); Cannondale prepared by Cyclocrossworld.com (Cyclocross)
- Disciplines: Cyclocross, Road Bike Racing; Track
- Role: Rider

Professional teams
- 2009–2010: Team Kenda (Road)
- 2009: Planet Bike (Cyclocross)
- 2010–present: Cannondale prepared by Cyclocrossworld.com (Cyclocross)
- 2011–present: Peanut Butter & Co. Twenty12

Major wins
- Cyclo-cross World Cup 1 individual win (2018–19)

Kaitlin Keough (née Antonneau; born January 1, 1992) is an American professional racing cyclist who has found success in cyclocross and road bicycle racing despite her young age, winning multiple national championships in both cyclocross and on the track.

== Life ==
Keough was born in Racine, Wisconsin. In 2010, Keough finished 8th in the UCI Junior World Championships while racing for the U.S. National Team. Keough joined the Cannondale prepared by Cyclocrossworld.com team for the 2010–2011 cyclocross season, winning the U23 Cyclocross National Championship and getting her first call up to the Elite Women's national team for the World Championships in Saint Wendel, Germany. For 2011, Keough joined the Peanut Butter & Co. Twenty12 women's cycling team. In June 2011, she won stage 3, at the Mount Hood Stage Race.

Keough currently attends Marian University, where she recently medaled in five track national championships, including the gold medal in the points race, team pursuit and team sprint. Keough also won the 2010 U23 Women's Cyclocross National Championship and finished second in the Collegiate Women's event.

Keough also represented the United States at the UCI Cyclocross World Championships in Saint Wendel, Germany in January 2011, in her first year of eligibility.

In 2017, she married fellow professional cyclist Luke Keough.

== 2010 Major Results ==
- (U23) 1st United States Cyclocross National Championships – Bend, OR
- (Collegiate) 2nd United States Cyclocross National Championships – Bend, OR
- US Gran Prix of Cyclocross
  - 4th USGP #3 – Derby City Cup #1 Louisville, KY
  - 6th USGP #7 – Portland Cup #1 Portland, OR
  - 7th USGP #5 – New Belgium Cup #1 Fort Collins, CO
  - 8th USGP #8 – Portland Cup #2 Portland, OR
  - 9th USGP #4 – Derby City Cup #2 Louisville, KY
- North American Cyclocross Trophy
  - 6th NACT #3 – Gran Prix of Gloucester #1 Gloucester, MA
- 4th Jingle Cross Rock #3 – Iowa City, Iowa
- 4th Jingle Cross Rock #1 – Iowa City, Iowa
- 3rd Bio Wheels/United Dairy Farmers Harbin Park International, Cincinnati, OH
- 6th Java Johnny's – Lionhearts International, Middletown, OH
