= Fleur Nagengast =

Dutch cyclist (born 1998)

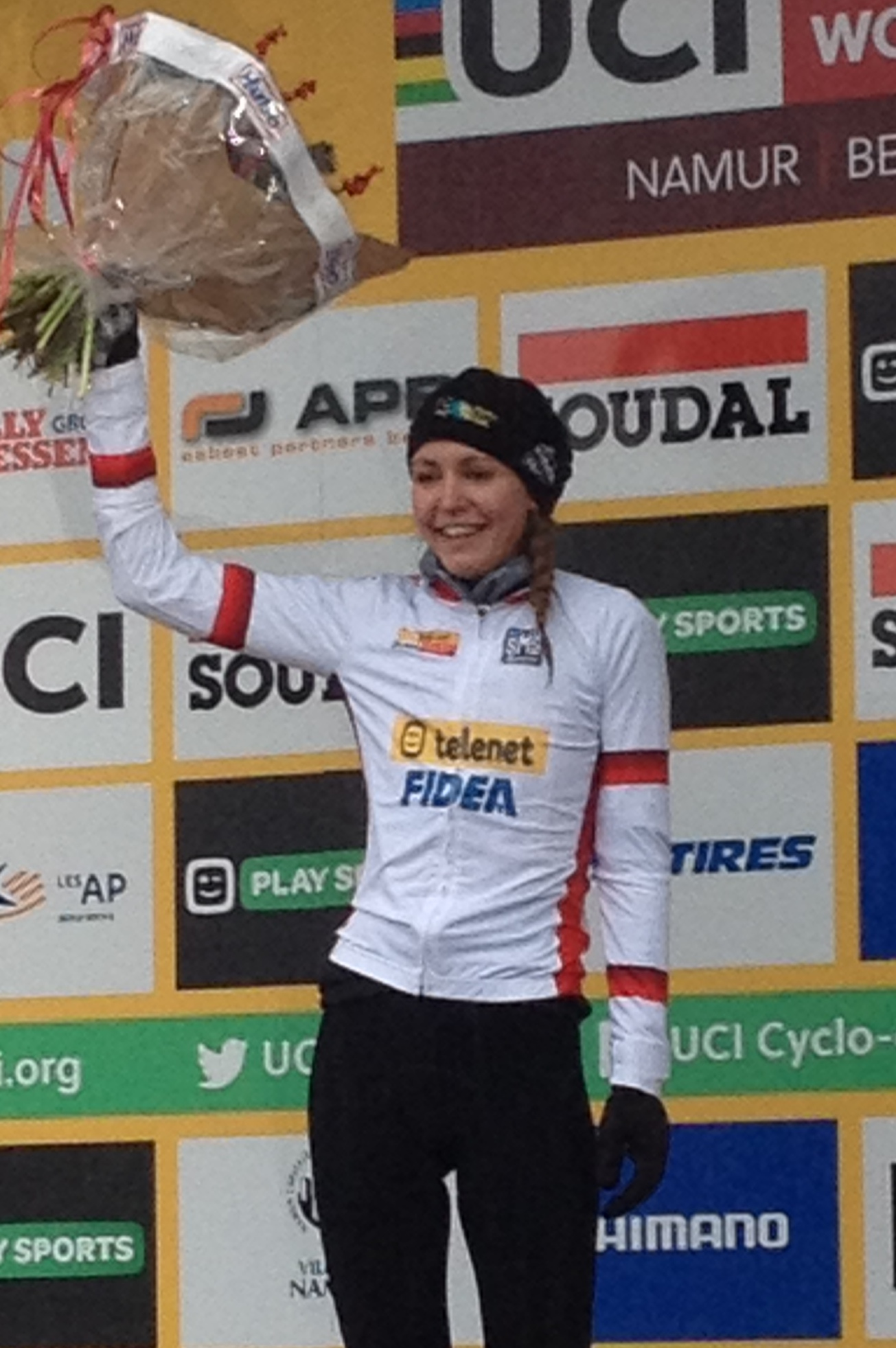
- Nagengast in 2018

Personal information
- Full name: Fleur Nagengast
- Born: 28 January 1998 (age 28)

Cycling career
- Sport: Cycling
- Current team: Retired
- Discipline: Road
- Role: Rider

Amateur team
- 2015–2018: Young Telenet–Fidea

Professional teams
- 2018–2020: Telenet–Fidea (cyclo-cross)
- 2019–2020: Parkhotel Valkenburg (road)

Fleur Nagengast (born 28 January 1998) is a Dutch former professional racing cyclist, who competed in cyclo-cross for Telenet–Fidea, and in road racing for UCI Women's Continental Team Parkhotel Valkenburg.
