= Memorial Romano Scotti =

Cyclocross race in Rome, Italy

Race details
- Date: End of December, beginning of January
- Region: Rome, Italy
- Discipline: Cyclo-cross
- Competition: World Cup
- Web site: www.ciclocrossroma.it

History
- First edition: 2011
- Editions: 4 (as of 2014)
- First winner: Marco Aurelio Fontana (ITA)
- Most wins: Marco Aurelio Fontana (ITA) (2 wins)
- Most recent: Niels Albert (BEL)

The Memorial Romano Scotti is a cyclo-cross race held in Rome, Italy. Its first edition was on 9 January 2011 as the Italian National Championship. It was held a second time in December of that year. Since the 2012–2013 season, it is part of the UCI Cyclo-cross World Cup. The event is named after Italian cyclist Romano Scotti.

== Results ==
=== Men ===
Year	Winner	Second	Third	Ref
2014	Niels Albert (BEL)	Lars van der Haar (NED)	Sven Nys (BEL)	
2013	Kevin Pauwels (BEL)	Niels Albert (BEL)	Marco Aurelio Fontana (ITA)	
2011 (Dec.)	Marco Aurelio Fontana (ITA)	Cristian Cominelli (ITA)	Luca Damiani (ITA)	
2011 (Jan.)	Marco Aurelio Fontana (ITA)	Marco Bianco (ITA)	Fabio Ursi (ITA)	

=== Women ===
Year	Winner	Second	Third	Ref
2014	Katie Compton (USA)	Marianne Vos (NED)	Eva Lechner (ITA)	
2013	Marianne Vos (NED)	Katie Compton (USA)	Kateřina Nash (CZE)	
2011 (Dec.)	Vania Rossi (ITA)	Eva Lechner (ITA)	Valentina Scandolara (ITA)	
2011 (Jan.)	Vania Rossi (ITA)	Francesca Cucciniello (ITA)	Eva Lechner (ITA)	
