= Italian National Cyclo-cross Championships =

Race details

History
- First edition: 1930

The first professional Italian National Cyclo-cross Championships were held in 1930 and have continued to 2025.
