= List of career achievements by Wout van Aert =

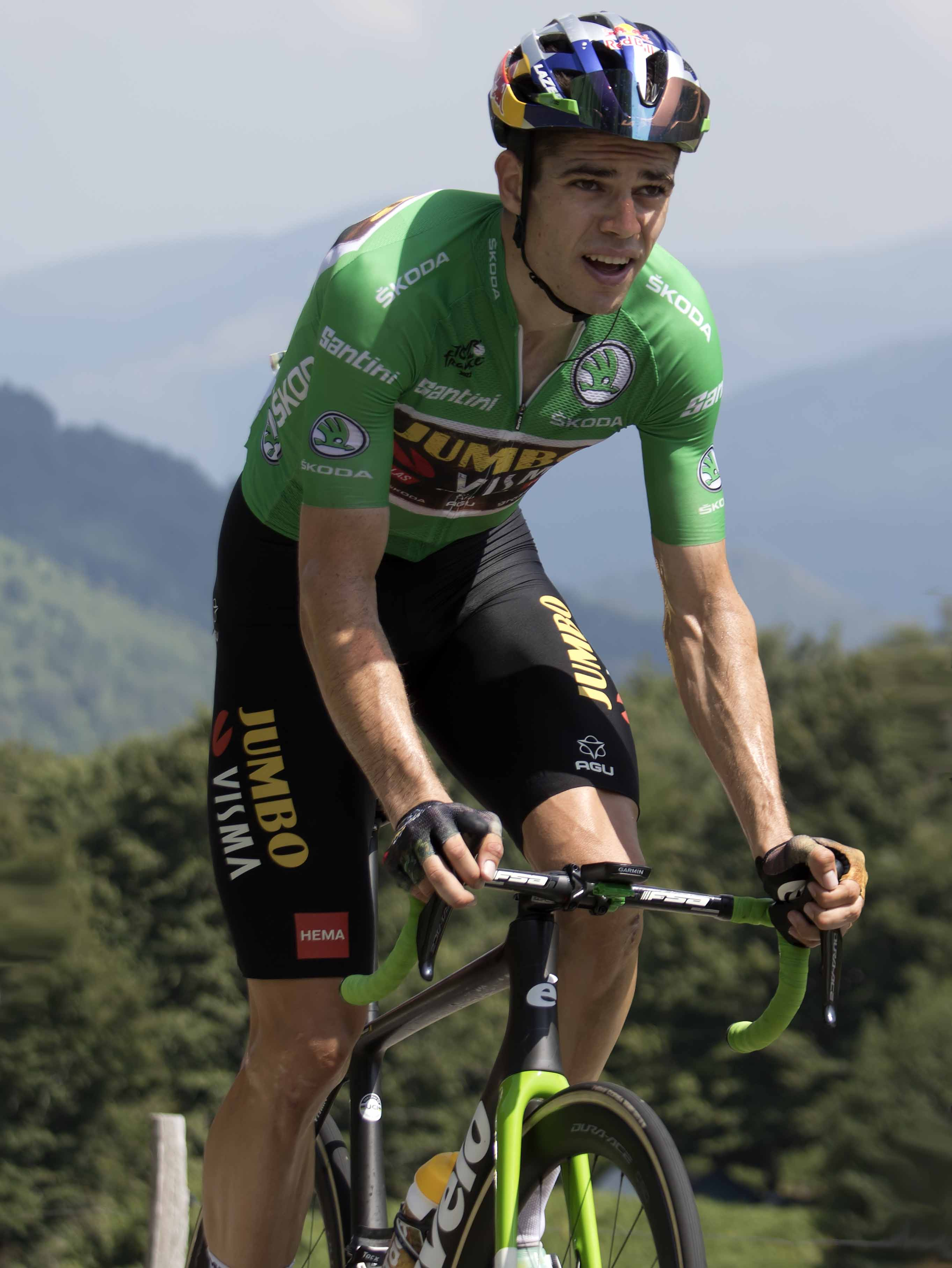
- Van Aert during the 2022 Tour de France

Cycling career
- Sport: Cycling

Major wins
- Cyclo-cross World Championships (2016, 2017, 2018) National Championships (2016, 2017, 2018, 2021, 2022) World Cup (2015–16, 2016–17, 2020–21) 17 individual wins (2014–15—2018–19, 2020–21—2024–25) Trophy (2014–15, 2015–16, 2016–17) Superprestige (2015–16) Road Grand Tours Tour de France Points classification (2022) 10 individual stages (2019—2022, 2025) 1 TTT stage (2019) Combativity award (2022) Giro d’Italia 1 individual stage (2025) Vuelta a España Points classification (2026) 5 individual stages (2024, 2026) Combativity award (2026) Stage races Tour of Britain (2021, 2023) Danmark Rundt (2018, 2026) One-day races and Classics National Time Trial Championships (2019, 2020, 2023) National Road Race Championships (2021) Milan–San Remo (2020) Paris–Roubaix (2026) E3 Saxo Bank Classic (2022, 2023) Strade Bianche (2020) Gent–Wevelgem (2021) Amstel Gold Race (2021) Omloop Het Nieuwsblad (2022) Bretagne Classic (2022) Coppa Bernocchi (2023) Kuurne–Brussels–Kuurne (2024)
Medal record
Representing Belgium
Men's cyclo-cross
World Championships
Gold medal – first place	2018 Valkenburg	Elite
Gold medal – first place	2017 Bieles	Elite
Gold medal – first place	2016 Heusden-Zolder	Elite
Gold medal – first place	2014 Hoogerheide	Under-23
Silver medal – second place	2025 Liévin	Elite
Silver medal – second place	2021 Ostend	Elite
Silver medal – second place	2019 Bogense	Elite
Silver medal – second place	2015 Tabor	Elite
Silver medal – second place	2012 Koksijde	Junior
Bronze medal – third place	2013 Louisville	Under-23
European Championships
Gold medal – first place	2014 Lorsch	Under-23
Silver medal – second place	2015 Huijbergen	Elite
Silver medal – second place	2018 Rosmalen	Elite
Bronze medal – third place	2016 Pontchâteau	Elite
Men's road cycling
Olympic Games
Silver medal – second place	2020 Tokyo	Road race
Bronze medal – third place	2024 Paris	Time trial
World Championships
Silver medal – second place	2020 Imola	Road race
Silver medal – second place	2020 Imola	Time trial
Silver medal – second place	2021 Flanders	Time trial
European Championships
Silver medal – second place	2023 Drenthe	Road race
Bronze medal – third place	2018 Glasgow	Road race
Bronze medal – third place	2023 Drenthe	Time trial

This is a list of career achievements by Wout van Aert, a Belgian professional racing cyclist for UCI WorldTeam Visma–Lease a Bike. Originally a cyclo-cross competitor as a junior, van Aert has also competed on the road as a professional since 2013.

== Career highlights ==
2016

- Wins his first UCI Cyclo-cross World Championship title.
- Wins his first National Cyclo-cross Championship title.

2017

- Wins his second UCI Cyclo-cross World Championship title
- Wins his second National Cyclo-cross Championship title.

2018

- Wins his third UCI Cyclo-cross World Championship title
- Wins his third National Cyclo-cross Championship title.

2019

- Wins his first stage at World Tour level during the Critérium du Dauphiné.
- Wins his first National Time Trial Championship title.
- Wins his first Grand Tour stage in the Tour de France.

2020

- Wins his first major classic, Strade Bianche.
- Wins his first Monument, Milan–San Remo
- Wins his second National Time Trial Championship title.

2021

- Wins his first National Road Race Championship title.
- Wins his fourth National Cyclo-cross Championship title.

2022

- Wins his first Tour de France Points classification.
- Wins his fifth National Cyclo-cross Championship title.

2023

- Wins his third National Time Trial Championship title.

2026

- Wins his second Monument, Paris–Roubaix.

== Career achievements ==
=== Major championships timeline ===
Event		2014	2015	2016	2017	2018	2019	2020	2021	2022	2023	2024	2025	2026
Olympic Games	Road race	Not held		—	Not held				2	Not held		37	Not held	
Olympic Games	Time trial	Not held		—	Not held				6	Not held		3	Not held	
World Championships	Cyclo-cross	—	2	1	1	1	2	4	2	—	2	—	2	—
World Championships	Gravel	Not held								—	8	—	—	
World Championships	Road race	—	—	—	—	—	—	2	11	4	2	—	—	
World Championships	Time trial	—	—	—	—	—	—	2	2	—	5	—	—	
European Championships	Cyclo-cross	—	2	3	—	2	—	—	—	—	—	—	—	
European Championships	Road race	—	—	—	—	3	—	—	—	—	2	—	—	
European Championships	Time trial	—	—	—	—	—	—	—	—	—	3	—	—	
National Championships	Cyclo-cross	—	3	1	1	1	2	5	1	1	—	—	—	—
National Championships	Road race	63	47	9	60	13	3	—	1	—	47	5	—	
National Championships	Time trial	—	—	—	6	—	1	1	—	—	1	—	—	

=== Cyclo-cross ===
2011–2012
2nd UCI World Junior Championships
2nd National Junior Championships
2nd Overall Junior Superprestige

1st Ruddervoorde

4th UEC European Junior Championships
2012–2013
1st Overall Under-23 Superprestige

1st Zonhoven
1st Gavere
1st Gieten

Under-23 Bpost Bank Trophy

1st Oostmalle

2nd Overall UCI Under-23 World Cup
3rd UCI World Under-23 Championships
3rd National Under-23 Championships
5th UEC European Under-23 Championships
2013–2014 (1 pro win)
1st UCI World Under-23 Championships
1st Overall Under-23 Bpost Bank Trophy

1st Hasselt
1st Essen
1st Loenhout
1st Baal
1st Lille

1st Otegem
2nd Overall UCI Under-23 World Cup

1st Namur
1st Nommay

2nd Overall Under-23 Superprestige

1st Gavere
1st Hoogstraten
1st Middelkerke

4th UEC European Under-23 Championships
2014–2015 (11)
1st UEC European Under-23 Championships
1st Overall Bpost Bank Trophy

1st Koppenberg
1st Hamme
1st Essen
1st Loenhout
1st Baal
2nd Hasselt
2nd Lille

UCI World Cup

1st Koksijde
2nd Hoogerheide

1st Bredene
1st Zonnebeke
1st Eeklo
1st Mol
1st Oostmalle
2nd UCI World Championships
Soudal Classics

2nd Niel
2nd Mechelen

3rd National Championships
3rd Overall UCI Under-23 World Cup

1st Namur
2nd Cauberg
2nd Heusden-Zolder

Superprestige

3rd Hoogstraten
3rd Middelkerke

Under-23 Superprestige

1st Gieten
1st Zonhoven
1st Gavere
1st Spa-Francorchamps

2015–2016 (18)
1st UCI World Championships
1st National Championships
1st Overall UCI World Cup

1st Las Vegas
2nd Cauberg
2nd Koksijde
2nd Namur
2nd Lignières-en-Berry
2nd Hoogerheide

1st Overall Superprestige

1st Gieten
1st Zonhoven
1st Gavere
1st Spa-Francorchamps
2nd Ruddervoorde
2nd Hoogstraten
3rd Middelkerke

1st Overall Bpost Bank Trophy

1st Ronse
1st Koppenberg
1st Hamme
1st Essen
1st Antwerpen
1st Baal
2nd Sint-Niklaas
3rd Loenhout

Soudal Classics

1st Neerpelt
2nd Mechelen

1st Eeklo
1st Erpe-Mere
1st Kruibeke
1st Mol
2nd UEC European Championships
2nd Boom
2nd Oostmalle
2016–2017 (17)
1st UCI World Championships
1st National Championships
1st Overall UCI World Cup

1st Las Vegas
1st Iowa City
1st Heusden-Zolder
1st Rome
2nd Cauberg
2nd Zeven
2nd Namur

1st Overall DVV Trophy

1st Ronse
1st Koppenberg
1st Essen
1st Loenhout
2nd Hamme
2nd Antwerpen
2nd Baal
2nd Lille

2nd Overall Superprestige

1st Spa-Francorchamps
2nd Gieten
2nd Zonhoven
2nd Ruddervoorde
2nd Gavere
2nd Diegem
2nd Hoogstraten
2nd Middelkerke

Brico Cross

1st Geraardsbergen
1st Bredene
2nd Kruibeke
3rd Hulst

1st Waterloo
1st Ardooie
1st Boom
1st Oostmalle
2nd Mol
2nd Overijse
3rd UEC European Championships
2017–2018 (9)
1st UCI World Championships
1st National Championships
2nd Overall UCI World Cup

1st Zeven
1st Namur
2nd Bogense
2nd Nommay
2nd Hoogerheide
3rd Koksijde
3rd Heusden-Zolder

2nd Overall Superprestige

1st Boom
1st Gavere
2nd Gieten
2nd Zonhoven
2nd Ruddervoorde
2nd Diegem

3rd Overall DVV Trophy

2nd Hamme
2nd Antwerpen
2nd Loenhout
2nd Baal
3rd Ronse

Brico Cross

1st Bredene
2nd Eeklo
2nd Kruibeke
3rd Meulebeke

Soudal Classics

1st Sint-Niklaas

1st Ardooie
2nd Otegem
2018–2019 (4)
2nd Overall UCI World Cup

1st Pontchâteau
2nd Waterloo
2nd Iowa City
2nd Bern
2nd Koksijde
2nd Namur
2nd Heusden-Zolder
3rd Hoogerheide

Superprestige

2nd Gieten
2nd Ruddervoorde
2nd Zonhoven
3rd Gavere

DVV Trophy

2nd Antwerpen
2nd Loenhout
3rd Koppenberg

Brico Cross

1st Bredene
2nd Geraardsbergen
2nd Meulebeke
2nd Ronse

1st La Mézière
1st Ardooie
2nd UCI World Championships
2nd UEC European Championships
2nd National Championships
3rd Wachtebeke
2019–2020 (1)
DVV Trophy

1st Lille

2nd Zonnebeke
4th UCI World Championships
2020–2021 (5)
1st National Championships
1st Overall UCI World Cup

1st Dendermonde
1st Overijse
2nd Namur
2nd Hulst
3rd Tábor

X²O Badkamers Trophy

1st Herentals
2nd Baal
2nd Hamme
3rd Kortrijk

1st Mol
Superprestige

2nd Heusden-Zolder

2nd UCI World Championships
2021–2022 (9)
1st National Championships
UCI World Cup

1st Val di Sole
1st Dendermonde

Superprestige

1st Boom
1st Heusden-Zolder

X²O Badkamers Trophy

1st Loenhout
1st Baal
1st Herentals

Ethias Cross

1st Essen

2022–2023 (9)
UCI World Cup

1st Dublin
1st Zonhoven
2nd Antwerpen
2nd Gavere
2nd Benidorm

Superprestige

1st Heusden-Zolder
1st Diegem
1st Gullegem

X²O Badkamers Trophy

1st Koksijde
1st Hamme
2nd Herentals

Exact Cross

1st Mol
1st Loenhout

2nd UCI World Championships
2023–2024 (3)
UCI World Cup

1st Benidorm
2nd Antwerpen
2nd Gavere
5th Hulst

Superprestige

1st Heusden-Zolder

Exact Cross

1st Essen
2nd Mol

X²O Badkamers Trophy

2nd Baal
3rd Koksijde

2024–2025 (2)
UCI World Cup

1st Dendermonde
2nd Maasmechelen
4th Benidorm

Superprestige

1st Gullegem

2nd UCI World Championships
2025–2026
Superprestige

2nd Heusden-Zolder

X²O Badkamers Trophy

2nd Hofstade

==== UCI World Cup results ====
Season	1	2	3	4	5	6	7	8	9	10	11	12	13	14	15	16	Rank	Points
2014–2015	VAL —	KOK; 1	MIL —	NAM —	ZOL —	HOO; 2											24	150
2015–2016	LAS; 1	VAL; 2	KOK; 2	NAM; 2	ZOL; 8	LIG; 2	HOO; 2										1	476
2016–2017	LAS; 1	IOW; 1	VAL; 2	KOK; NH	ZEV; 2	NAM; 2	ZOL; 1	FIU; 1	HOO —								1	530
2017–2018	IOW; 14	WAT; 7	KOK; 3	BOG; 2	ZEV; 1	NAM; 1	ZOL; 3	NOM; 2	HOO; 2								2	585
2018–2019	WAT; 2	IOW; 2	BER; 2	TAB; 7	KOK; 2	NAM; 2	ZOL; 2	PON; 1	HOO; 3								2	613
2019–2020	IOW —	WAT —	BER —	TAB —	KOK —	NAM —	ZOL —	NOM —	HOO; 8								53	46
2020–2021	WAT; NH	DUB; NH	ZON; NH	KOK; NH	BES; NH	TAB; 3	ANT; NH	NAM; 2	DIE; NH	DEN; 1	HUL; 2	VIL; NH	HOO; NH	OVE; 1			1	165
2021–2022	WAT —	FAY —	IOW —	ZON —	OVE —	TAB —	KOK —	ANT; NH	BES —	VAL; 1	RUC —	NAM —	DEN; 1	HUL; 4	FLA —	HOO —	17	102
2022–2023	WAT —	FAY —	TAB —	MAA —	BER —	OVE —	HUL —	ANT; 2	DUB; 1	VAL —	GAV; 2	ZON; 1	BEN; 2	BES —			9	170
2023–2024	WAT —	MAA —	DEN —	TRO —	DUB —	FLA —	VAL —	NAM —	ANT; 2	GAV; 2	HUL; 5	ZON —	BEN; 1	HOO —			15	121
2024–2025	ANT —	DUB —	CAB; NH	NAM —	HUL —	ZON —	GAV —	BES —	DEN; 1	BEN; 4	MAA; 2	HOO —					17	92
2025–2026	TAB —	FLA —	TER —	NAM —	ANT; 7	KOK —	GAV —	DEN; 6	ZON —	BEN —	MAA —	HOO —					29	39

==== Superprestige results ====
Season	1	2	3	4	5	6	7	8	Rank	Points
2014–2015	GIE —	ZON —	RUD —	GAV —	SPA —	DIE —	HOO; 3	MID; 3	12	26
2015–2016	GIE; 1	ZON; 1	RUD; 2	GAV; 1	SPA; 1	DIE; 10	HOO; 2	MID; 3	1	107
2016–2017	GIE; 2	ZON; 2	RUD; 2	GAV; 2	SPA; 1	DIE; 2	HOO; 2	MID; 2	2	113
2017–2018	GIE; 2	ZON; 2	BOO; 1	RUD; 2	GAV; 1	DIE; 2	HOO; 6	MID —	2	96
2018–2019	GIE; 2	BOO —	RUD; 2	GAV; 3	ZON; 2	DIE; 5	HOO —	MID —	4	66
2019–2020	GIE —	BOO —	GAV —	RUD —	ZON —	DIE —	MER; NH	MID —	n\a	n\a
2020–2021	GIE —	RUD —	NIE —	MER —	BOO; 4	GAV —	ZOL; 2	MID —	13	26
2021–2022	GIE —	RUD —	NIE —	MER —	BOO; 1	ZOL; 1	DIE; NH	GAV —	10	30
2022–2023	RUD —	NIE —	MER —	BOO —	ZOL; 1	DIE; 1	GUL; 1	MID —	8	45
2023–2024	OVE —	RUD —	NIE —	MER —	BOO —	ZOL; 1	DIE —	MID —	23	15
2024–2025	RUD —	OVE —	NIE —	MER —	MOL —	DIE —	GUL; 1	MID —	18	15
2025–2026	RUD —	OVE —	NIE —	MER —	ZOL; 2	DIE —	GUL —	MID —	22	14

==== Trofee results ====
Season	1	2	3	4	5	6	7	8	Rank	Time
2014–2015	RON; 7	OUD; 1	HAM; 1	HAS; 2	ESS; 1	LOU; 1	BAA; 1	LIL; 2	1	8:20:38
2015–2016	RON; 1	OUD; 1	HAM; 1	ESS; 1	ANT; 1	LOU; 3	BAA; 1	SIN; 2	1	7:50:13
2016–2017	RON; 1	OUD; 1	HAM; 2	ESS; 1	ANT; 2	LOU; 1	BAA; 2	LIL; 2	1	8:15:47
2017–2018	RON; 3	OUD; 4	HAM; 2	ESS —	ANT; 2	LOU; 2	BAA; 2	LIL; 8	3	+11:12"
2018–2019	OUD; 3	NIE —	HAM —	ANT; 2	LOU; 2	BAA —	BRU —	LIL —	14	+23:49"
2019–2020	OUD —	HAM —	KOR —	RON —	LOU; 5	BAA —	BRU —	LIL; 1	16	+27:23"
2020–2021	OUD —	KOR; 3	ANT —	HER; 1	BAA; 2	HAM; 2	LIL —	BRU —	9	+15:07"
2021–2022	OUD —	KOR —	LOU; 1	BAA; 1	HER; 1	HAM —	LIL —	BRU —	9	+21:04"
2022–2023	OUD —	KOR —	BAA —	HER; 2	KOK; 1	HAM; 1	LIL —	BRU —	6	+22:13"
2023–2024	OUD —	KOR —	HER —	BAA; 2	KOK; 3	HAM —	LIL —	BRU —	14	+23:01"
2024–2025	OUD —	LOK —	HAM —	HER —	BAA —	KOK —	LIL —	BRU —	—	—
2025–2026	OUD —	LOK —	HAM —	HOF; 2	LOE; 10	BAA —	LIL —	BRU —	23	+23:58"

=== Gravel ===
2023
UCI World Series

1st Houffalize

8th UCI World Championships
2026
UCI World Series

1st Valkenburg

=== Road ===
2012
4th Overall Sint-Martinusprijs Kontich
2014
8th Overall Ster ZLM Toer
2015
4th Omloop Het Nieuwsblad U23
4th Grote Prijs Jef Scherens
2016 (2 pro wins)
1st Schaal Sels
2nd Dwars door het Hageland
4th Grand Prix Pino Cerami
8th Overall Tour of Belgium

1st Prologue

2017 (3)
1st Ronde van Limburg
1st Bruges Cycling Classic
1st Grand Prix Pino Cerami
2nd Schaal Sels
2nd Rad am Ring
3rd Dwars door het Hageland
10th Overall Tour of Belgium
2018 (2)
1st Overall Danmark Rundt

1st Stage 2

3rd Road race, UEC European Championships
3rd Strade Bianche
8th Antwerp Port Epic
9th Tour of Flanders
10th Gent–Wevelgem
2019 (4)
National Championships

1st Time trial
3rd Road race

Tour de France

1st Stages 2 (TTT) & 10
Held after Stages 2–5

Critérium du Dauphiné

1st Points classification
1st Stages 4 (ITT) & 5

2nd E3 Binckbank Classic
3rd Strade Bianche
6th Milan–San Remo
2020 (6)
1st Time trial, National Championships
1st Milan–San Remo
1st Strade Bianche
Tour de France

1st Stages 5 & 7

Critérium du Dauphiné

1st Points classification
1st Stage 1

UCI World Championships

2nd Road race
2nd Time trial

2nd Tour of Flanders
3rd Milano–Torino
8th Gent–Wevelgem
2021 (13)
1st Road race, National Championships
1st Overall Tour of Britain

1st Stages 1, 4, 6 & 8

1st Gent–Wevelgem
1st Amstel Gold Race
Tour de France

1st Stages 11, 20 (ITT) & 21
Combativity award Stage 15

Olympic Games

2nd Road race
6th Time trial

2nd Time trial, UCI World Championships
2nd Overall Tirreno–Adriatico

1st Points classification
1st Stages 1 & 7 (ITT)

2nd Brabantse Pijl
3rd Milan–San Remo
4th Strade Bianche
6th Tour of Flanders
7th Paris–Roubaix
2022 (9)
1st Omloop Het Nieuwsblad
1st E3 Saxo Bank Classic
1st Bretagne Classic
Tour de France

1st Points classification
1st Stages 4, 8 & 20 (ITT)
Held after Stages 2–5
Combativity award Stages 6, 18 & Overall

Critérium du Dauphiné

1st Points classification
1st Stages 1 & 5

Paris–Nice

1st Points classification
1st Stage 4 (ITT)

2nd Paris–Roubaix
2nd Hamburg Cyclassics
2nd Grand Prix Cycliste de Montréal
3rd Liège–Bastogne–Liège
4th Road race, UCI World Championships
4th Grand Prix Cycliste de Québec
8th Milan–San Remo
2023 (5)
1st Time trial, National Championships
1st Overall Tour of Britain

1st Stage 5

1st E3 Saxo Classic
1st Coppa Bernocchi
1st Points classification, Tour de Suisse
UCI World Championships

2nd Road race
5th Time trial

UEC European Championships

2nd Road race
3rd Time trial

2nd Gent–Wevelgem
3rd Milan–San Remo
3rd Paris–Roubaix
4th Tour of Flanders
Tour de France

Combativity award Stages 5 & 6

2024 (5)
1st Kuurne–Brussels–Kuurne
Vuelta a España

1st Stages 3, 7 & 10
Held after Stages 2–3
Held after Stages 3–15
Held after Stages 13–15
Combativity award Stages 10 & 13

3rd Time trial, Olympic Games
3rd E3 Saxo Classic
3rd Omloop Het Nieuwsblad
5th Road race, National Championships
7th Overall Volta ao Algarve

1st Stage 3

10th Clásica de Almería
2025 (2)
1st Stage 21 Tour de France
1st Stage 9 Giro d'Italia
2nd Dwars door Vlaanderen
2nd Brabantse Pijl
4th Tour of Flanders
4th Paris–Roubaix
6th Overall Deutschland Tour
10th Hamburg Cyclassics
2026 (8)
1st Overall Danmark Rundt

1st Points classification
1st Stages 1, 2 & 3

1st Paris–Roubaix
Vuelta a España

1st Points classification
1st Stages 13 & 15
Combativity award Stages 7, 12 & Overall

Tour Auvergne-Rhône-Alpes

1st Stages 3 (TTT) & 5

2nd Dwars door Vlaanderen
3rd Milan–San Remo
4th Tour of Flanders
10th Strade Bianche

==== General classification results timeline ====
Grand Tour general classification results
Grand Tour	2019	2020	2021	2022	2023	2024	2025	2026
Giro d'Italia	—	—	—	—	—	—	72	—
Tour de France	DNF	20	19	21	DNF	52	67	—
Vuelta a España	—	—	—	—	—	DNF	—	44
Major stage race general classification results
Race	2019	2020	2021	2022	2023	2024	2025	2026
Paris–Nice	—	—	—		32	—	—	—
Tirreno–Adriatico	—	—	2	—	53	—	—	28
Volta a Catalunya	—	NH	—	—	—	—	—	—
Tour of the Basque Country	—	NH	—	—	—	—	—	—
Tour de Romandie	—	NH	—	—	—	—	—	—
Critérium du Dauphiné	47	32	—	49	—	—	—	DNF
Tour de Suisse	—	NH	—	—	31	—	—	—

==== Classics results timeline ====
Monument	2018	2019	2020	2021	2022	2023	2024	2025	2026
Milan–San Remo	—	6	1	3	8	3	—	—	3
Tour of Flanders	9	14	2	6	—	4	—	4	4
Paris–Roubaix	13	22	NH	7	2	3	—	4	1
Liège–Bastogne–Liège	—	—	—	—	3	—	—	—	—
Giro di Lombardia	—	—	—	—	—	—	—	—	—
Classic	2018	2019	2020	2021	2022	2023	2024	2025	2026
Omloop Het Nieuwsblad	32	13	11	—	1	—	3	11	—
Kuurne–Brussels–Kuurne	—	—	—	—	—	—	1	75	—
Strade Bianche	3	3	1	4	—	—	—	—	10
E3 Saxo Bank Classic	—	2	NH	11	1	1	3	15	—
Gent–Wevelgem	10	29	8	1	12	2	—	—	30
Dwars door Vlaanderen	83	—	—	—	—	—	DNF	2	2
Brabantse Pijl	—	—	—	2	—	—	—	2	—
Amstel Gold Race	—	58	NH	1	—	—	—	4	—
Hamburg Cyclassics	—	—	NH	NH	2	—	—	10	
Bretagne Classic	—	—	—	—	1	—	—	—	
Grand Prix Cycliste de Québec	—	—	Not held		4	—	—	14	
Grand Prix Cycliste de Montréal	—	—	Not held		2	—	—	DNF	

Legend
—	Did not compete
DNF	Did not finish
DSQ	Disqualified
NH	Not held
IP	In progress

==== Grand Tour record ====
	2019	2020	2021	2022	2023	2024	2025	2026
Giro d'Italia	DNE	DNE	DNE	DNE	DNE	DNE	72	DNE
Stages won	—	—	—	—	—	—	1	—
Points classification	—	—	—	—	—	—	3	—
Tour de France	DNF-13	20	19	22	DNS-18	52	67	DNE
Stages won	1	2	3	3	0	0	1	—
Points classification	—	5	5	1	—	8	8	—
Mountains classification	—	45	4	5	—	—	46	—
Vuelta a España	DNE	DNE	DNE	DNE	DNE	DNF-16	DNE	44
Stages won	—	—	—	—	—	3	—	2
Points classification	—	—	—	—	—	—	—	1

Legend
1	Winner
2–3	Top three-finish
4–10	Top ten-finish
11–	Other finish
DNE	Did not enter
DNF-x	Did not finish (retired on stage x)
DNS-x	Did not start (not started on stage x)
HD-x	Finished outside time limit (occurred on stage x)
DSQ	Disqualified
N/A	Race/classification not held
NR	Not ranked in this classification

==== Number of wins per year ====
This table includes number of wins, second-, third-, top 10-place finishes, Points classification wins and race days per year excluding UCI level 2 races.

	2012	2013	2014	2015	2016	2017	2018	2019	2020	2021	2022	2023	Total
Wins	0	0	0	0	2	3	2	4	6	13	9	1	40
2nd	0	0	0	0	2	2	2	3	3	6	11	1	30
3rd	0	0	0	0	0	3	2	3	3	4	5	2	22
Top 3	0	0	0	0	4	8	6	10	12	23	25	4	92
Top 10	1	0	1	1	8	10	11	13	15	32	30	6	128
GC	0	0	0	0	0	0	1	0	0	1	0	0	2
Points	0	0	0	0	0	0	0	1	0	1	3	0	5
Days	4	6	6	8	20	27	26	31	35	49	48	12	272

As of 5 June 2023

=== Awards and honours ===
- Flandrien Award: 2019, 2020, 2021
- Belgian Sportsman of the year: 2020, 2021
- Belgian National Sports Merit Award: 2020
- Vlaamse Reus: 2020
- Kristallen Fiets: 2020. 2021
- Vélo d'Or: 2nd place: 2022, 3rd place: 2020, 2021
- Giro d'Italia Trofeo Bonacossa: 2025
