= Thijs Aerts =

Belgian cyclist

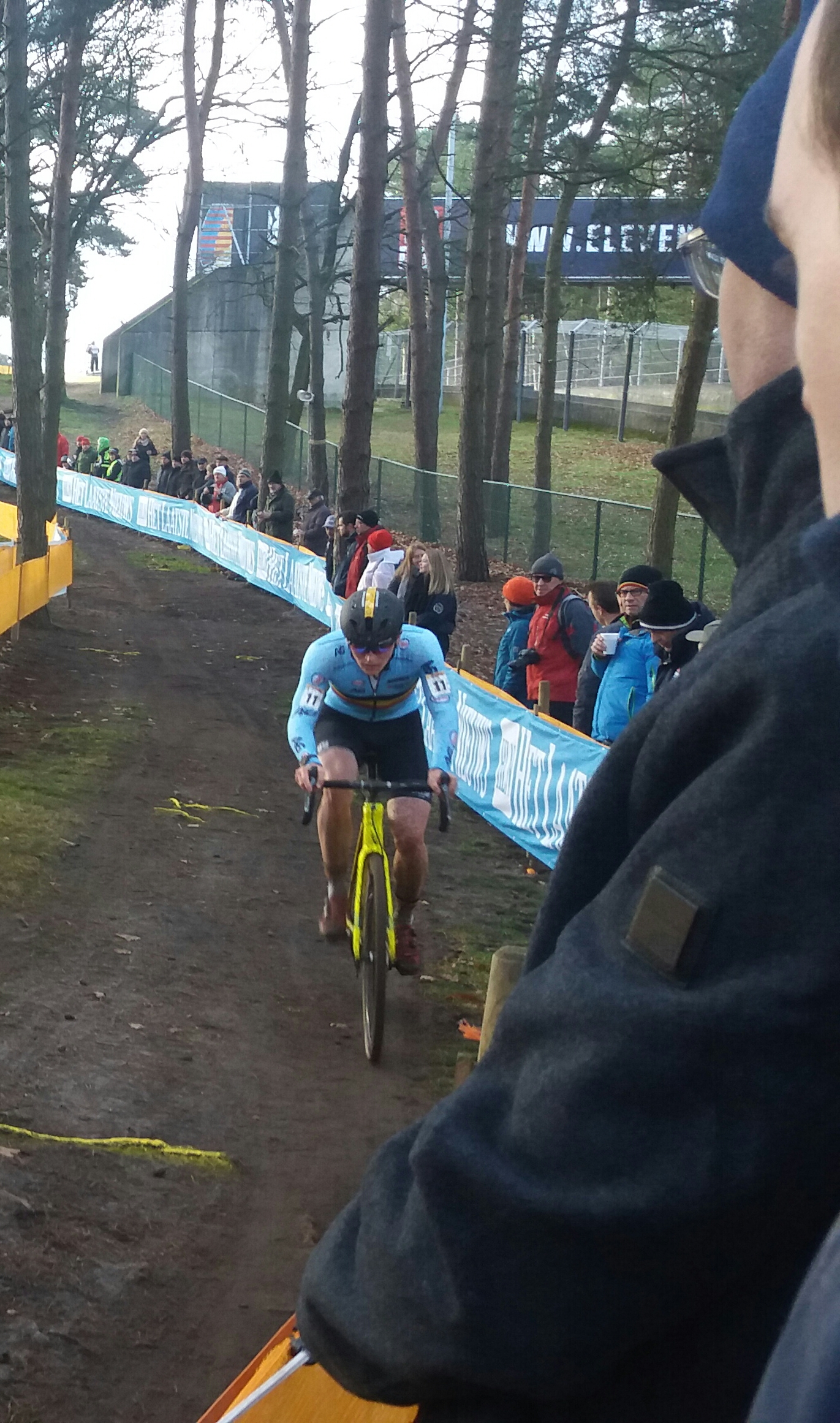
- Aerts in 2017

Personal information
- Full name: Thijs Aerts
- Born: 3 November 1996 (age 29) Namur, Belgium
- Height: 1.80 m (5 ft 11 in)
- Weight: 68 kg (150 lb)

Cycling career
- Sport: Cycling
- Current team: Wanty–Nippo–ReUz
- Disciplines: Road; Cyclo-cross
- Role: Rider

Professional teams
- 2015–2022: Telenet–Fidea
- 2023: Tormans Cyclo Cross Team
- 2023–: Circus–ReUz–Technord

Thijs Aerts (born 3 November 1996) is a Belgian cyclist, who currently rides for UCI Continental team Wanty–Nippo–ReUz. He competed in the men's under-23 event at the 2016 UCI Cyclo-cross World Championships in Heusden-Zolder. His brother Toon is also a professional cyclist.

== Major results ==
2012–2013
Junior Superprestige

3rd Hoogstraten

Junior Bpost Bank Trophy

3rd Oostmalle

2013–2014
UCI Junior World Cup

1st Nommay
1st Hoogerheide
3rd Koksijde
3rd Heusden-Zolder

Junior Superprestige

2nd Ruddervoorde
2nd Gieten
3rd Gavere
3rd Hoogstraten

Junior Bpost Bank Trophy

3rd Oostmalle

1st Junior Eeklo
2nd Junior Erpe-Mere
3rd National Junior Championships
2015–2016
1st National Under-23 Championships
Under-23 Bpost Bank Trophy

2nd GP Sven Nys

Under-23 Superprestige

3rd Middelkerke

2016–2017
Under-23 DVV Trophy

2nd Azencross
2nd GP Sven Nys
2nd Krawatencross

Under-23 Superprestige

2nd Spa-Francorchamps

UCI Under-23 World Cup

3rd Namur
3rd Hoogerheide

3rd Under-23 Oostmalle
2017–2018
1st National Under-23 Championships
3rd Overall UCI Under-23 World Cup

1st Nommay
2nd Zeven

1st Under-23 Oostmalle
Under-23 DVV Trophy

2nd Essen
2nd Krawatencross

Under-23 Superprestige

2nd Hoogstraten
3rd Gavere

2nd Under-23 Overijse
2018–2019
3rd Mol
3rd Rucphen
2019–2020
National Trophy Series

1st Crawley

1st Contern
Rectavit Series

3rd Niel

2021–2022
1st La Grandville
Ethias Cross

2nd Essen

2nd Trek Cup
2023–2024
2nd Rucphen
Exact Cross

3rd Essen

Copa de España

3rd As Pontes de García Rodríguez
