= 2014 UCI Cyclo-cross World Championships – Men's under-23 race =

Men's Under-23 Cyclo-cross Race
2014 UCI Cyclo-cross World Championships
- Rainbow jersey

Race details
- Dates: 2 February 2014
- Stages: 1
- Distance: 20.4 km (12.7 mi)
- Winning time: 49' 35"

Medalists
	Gold	Wout Van Aert (Belgium)
	Silver	Michael Vanthourenhout (Belgium)
	Bronze	Mathieu van der Poel (Netherlands)

This event was held on 2 February 2014 as part of the 2014 UCI Cyclo-cross World Championships at Hoogerheide, Netherlands. Participants must be men born in 1992 to 1995 and men in this age range must participate in this category. It was won by Wout Van Aert of Belgium.

== Race report ==
Toon Aerts of Belgium, whose brother Thijs Aerts had become World Champion in the Junior's category the day before, was the first to attack and break open the race. He never got particularly far though. Immediately after that Wout Van Aert, also of Belgium and one of the two favourites for the title, took over the attack and managed to create a gap of about ten seconds. By the end of the first lap he had an advantage of 17 seconds on a group of five riders with in it that other big favourite for the rainbow jersey: Mathieu van der Poel of Netherlands.

Lap two saw more expanding of the gap, partially due to good stopping work in the chasing group of other Belgians Aerts, Michael Vanthourenhout and Laurens Sweeck. By the end of it Vanthourenhout had broken away from that group, getting about ten seconds ahead of them. In the third lap the Belgian dominance grew as Sweeck dropped the others as well. Van Aert finished that lap 34 seconds ahead of Vanthourenhout and 56 seconds ahead of Sweeck. A group of Van der Poel, Aerts and Stan Godrie (Netherlands) followed on a minute of Van Aert.

The Dutchmen couldn't keep up with Aerts who then managed to join up with Sweeck. In the background David van der Poel passed his brother Mathieu, even more evidence of the off-day Mathieu experienced. Mathieu found his second wind and managed to catch up to the two Belgians. At the start of the last lap it was clear these three would be the contenders for the bronze medal. In a strong uphill section Van der Poel dropped the two Belgians and secured his bronze medal.

== Results ==
Rank	Cyclist	Time
Gold medal	Wout van Aert (BEL)	49' 35"
Silver medal	Michael Vanthourenhout (BEL)	+ 50"
Bronze medal	Mathieu van der Poel (NED)	+ 1' 17"
4	Laurens Sweeck (BEL)	+ 1' 20"
5	Toon Aerts (BEL)	+ 1' 26"
6	David van der Poel (NED)	+ 2' 09"
7	David Menut (FRA)	+ 2' 24"
8	Tomas Paprstka (CZE)	+ 2' 37"
9	Gert-Jan Bosman (NED)	+ 2' 38"
10	Gianni Vermeersch (BEL)	+ 2' 45"
