= 2014 UCI World Championships =

There are several 2014 UCI World Championships. The International Cycling Union (UCI) holds World Championships every year. In 2014, they include:

- 2014 UCI Road World Championships
- 2014 UCI Track Cycling World Championships
- 2014 UCI Mountain Bike & Trials World Championships
- 2014 UCI Cyclo-cross World Championships
- 2014 UCI BMX World Championships

Preceded by 2013 UCI World Championships	UCI World Championships; 2014	Succeeded by 2015 UCI World Championships
