= 2019 UCI World Championships =

There are several 2019 UCI World Championships. The International Cycling Union (UCI) holds World Championships every year. For 2019, this includes:

- 2019 UCI Road World Championships
- 2019 UCI Track Cycling World Championships
- 2019 UCI Mountain Bike World Championships
- 2019 UCI Cyclo-cross World Championships
- 2019 UCI BMX World Championships
- 2019 UCI Urban Cycling World Championships

Preceded by 2018 UCI World Championships	UCI World Championships; 2019	Succeeded by 2020 UCI World Championships
