= 2016–17 Cyclo-cross Superprestige =

Details
- Location: Belgium
- Races: 8

Champions
- Male individual champion: Mathieu van der Poel (NED) (Beobank–Corendon)
- Female individual champion: Sanne Cant (BEL) (IKO Enertherm–Beobank)

The Cyclo-cross Superprestige 2016–17 – also known as the Hansgrohe Superprestige for sponsorship reasons – was a season long cyclo-cross competition.

== Calendar ==
=== Men's competition ===
Date	Race	Winner	Team	Competition leader	Ref
2 October	Gieten	Mathieu van der Poel (NED)	Beobank–Corendon	Mathieu van der Poel (NED)	
16 October	Zonhoven	Mathieu van der Poel (NED)	Beobank–Corendon	Mathieu van der Poel (NED)	
6 November	Ruddervoorde	Mathieu van der Poel (NED)	Beobank–Corendon	Mathieu van der Poel (NED)	
13 November	Gavere	Mathieu van der Poel (NED)	Beobank–Corendon	Mathieu van der Poel (NED)	
12 December	Spa-Francorchamps	Wout van Aert (BEL)	Crelan–Vastgoedservice	Mathieu van der Poel (NED)	
23 December	Diegem	Mathieu van der Poel (NED)	Beobank–Corendon	Mathieu van der Poel (NED)	
5 February	Hoogstraten	Mathieu van der Poel (NED)	Beobank–Corendon	Mathieu van der Poel (NED)	
11 February	Middelkerke	Mathieu van der Poel (NED)	Beobank–Corendon	Mathieu van der Poel (NED)	

=== Women's competition ===
Date	Race	Winner	Team	Competition leader	Ref
2 October	Gieten	Sanne Cant (BEL)	IKO Enertherm–Beobank	Sanne Cant (BEL)	
16 October	Zonhoven	Sanne Cant (BEL)	IKO Enertherm–Beobank	Sanne Cant (BEL)	
6 November	Ruddervoorde	Sophie de Boer (NED)	Kalas–NNOF	Sanne Cant (BEL)	
13 November	Gavere	Sanne Cant (BEL)	IKO Enertherm–Beobank	Sanne Cant (BEL)	
12 December	Spa-Francorchamps	Thalita de Jong (NED)	Rabobank-Liv Woman Cycling Team	Sanne Cant (BEL)	
23 December	Diegem	Marianne Vos (NED)	Rabobank-Liv Woman Cycling Team	Sanne Cant (BEL)	
5 February	Hoogstraten	Sophie de Boer (NED)	Breepark	Sanne Cant (BEL)	
11 February	Middelkerke	Sanne Cant (BEL)	IKO Enertherm–Beobank	Sanne Cant (BEL)	

== Rankings ==
=== Men's Ranking (top-5) ===
	Rider	Team(s)	Points
1	Mathieu van der Poel (NED)	Beobank–Corendon	119
2	Wout van Aert (BEL)	Crelan–Vastgoedservice; Vérandas Willems–Crelan	113
3	Laurens Sweeck (BEL)	ERA Real Estate–Circus; ERA–Circus	92
4	Kevin Pauwels (BEL)	Marlux–Napoleon Games	72
5	Jens Adams (BEL)	Crelan–Vastgoedservice; Vérandas Willems–Crelan	66

=== Women's Ranking (top-5) ===
	Rider	Team	Points
1	Sanne Cant (BEL)	IKO Enertherm–Beobank	113
2	Sophie de Boer (NED)	Kalas–NNOF; Breepark	100
3	Ellen Van Loy (BEL)	Telenet–Fidea Lions	100
4	Elle Anderson (USA)	Elle Anderson Racing	69
5	Laura Verdonschot (BEL)	Marlux–Napoleon Games	67
