= 2016 UCI World Championships =

There are several 2016 UCI World Championships. The International Cycling Union (UCI) holds World Championships every year. For 2016, this includes:

- 2016 UCI Road World Championships
- 2016 UCI Track Cycling World Championships
- 2016 UCI Mountain Bike & Trials World Championships
- 2016 UCI Cyclo-cross World Championships
- 2016 UCI BMX World Championships

Preceded by 2015 UCI World Championships	UCI World Championships; 2016	Succeeded by 2017 UCI World Championships
