= 2015 UCI World Championships =

There are several 2015 UCI World Championships. The International Cycling Union (UCI) holds World Championships every year. For 2015, these include:

- 2015 UCI Road World Championships in Richmond, Virginia in September 2015.
- 2015 UCI Track Cycling World Championships in February 2015
- 2015 UCI Para-cycling Road World Championships
- 2015 UCI Para-cycling Track World Championships
- 2015 UCI Mountain Bike & Trials World Championships
- 2015 UCI Mountain Bike Marathon World Championships
- 2015 UCI Cyclo-cross World Championships
- 2015 UCI BMX World Championships
- 2015 UCI Indoor Cycling World Championships

Preceded by 2014 UCI World Championships	UCI World Championships; 2015	Succeeded by 2016 UCI World Championships
