= 2018 UCI World Championships =

There are several 2018 UCI World Championships. The International Cycling Union (UCI) holds World Championships every year. For 2018, this includes:

- 2018 UCI Road World Championships
- 2018 UCI Track Cycling World Championships
- 2018 UCI Mountain Bike World Championships
- 2018 UCI Cyclo-cross World Championships
- 2018 UCI BMX World Championships
- 2018 UCI Urban Cycling World Championships

Preceded by 2017 UCI World Championships	UCI World Championships; 2018	Succeeded by 2019 UCI World Championships
