= 2015–16 Cyclo-cross Superprestige =

Bicycle racing competition

Details
- Dates: 4 October 2015–13 February 2016
- Location: Belgium and Netherlands
- Races: 8

Champions
- Male individual champion: Wout van Aert (BEL) (Crelan–Vastgoedservice)
- Female individual champion: Sanne Cant (BEL) (Enertherm–BKCP)

The 2015–16 Cyclo-cross Superprestige events and season-long competition started on 4 October 2015 and concluded on 13 February 2016. Due to injury, defending champion Mathieu van der Poel missed the start of the season.

== Results ==
Date	Venue	Winner	Second	Third	Classification Leader
4 October	(Netherlands) Gieten	Wout van Aert (BEL)	Lars van der Haar (NED)	Tim Merlier (BEL)	Wout van Aert (BEL)
25 October	(Belgium) Zonhoven	Wout van Aert (BEL)	Rob Peeters (BEL)	Kevin Pauwels (BEL)	Wout van Aert (BEL)
8 November	(Belgium) Ruddervoorde	Kevin Pauwels (BEL)	Wout van Aert (BEL)	Sven Nys (BEL)	Wout van Aert (BEL)
15 November	(Belgium) Gavere	Wout van Aert (BEL)	Sven Nys (BEL)	Kevin Pauwels (BEL)	Wout van Aert (BEL)
13 December	(Belgium) Spa-Francorchamps	Wout van Aert (BEL)	Sven Nys (BEL)	Kevin Pauwels (BEL)	Wout van Aert (BEL)
27 December	(Belgium) Diegem	Mathieu van der Poel (NED)	Kevin Pauwels (BEL)	Lars Van der Haar (NED)	Wout van Aert (BEL)
7 February	(Belgium) Hoogstraten	Mathieu van der Poel (NED)	Wout van Aert (BEL)	Tom Meeusen (BEL)	Wout van Aert (BEL)
13 February	(Belgium) Middelkerke	Mathieu van der Poel (NED)	Tom Meeusen (BEL)	Wout van Aert (BEL)	Wout van Aert (BEL)

== Season standings ==
In each race, the top 15 riders gain points, going from 15 points for the winner decreasing by one point per position to 1 point for the rider finishing in 15th position. In case of ties in the total score of two or more riders, the following tie breakers exist: most races started, most races won, best result in the last race.

Pos.	Rider	Team	GIE	ZON	RUD	GAV	SPA	DIE	HOO	MID	Points
1	(Belgium) Wout van Aert	Vastgoedservice–Golden Palace	1	1	2	1	1	10	2	3	107
2	(Belgium) Sven Nys	Crelan-AA Drink	4	4	3	2	2	6	4	4	99
3	(Netherlands) Lars van der Haar	Team Giant–Alpecin	2	5	6	4	8	3	7	6	87
4	(Belgium) Kevin Pauwels	Sunweb–Napoleon Games	7	3	1	3	3	2	11	14	84
5	(Belgium) Klaas Vantornout	Sunweb–Napoleon Games	5	Ret	4	6	4	7	9	7	70
6	(Belgium) Tom Meeusen	Telenet–Fidea	16	10	5	23	9	4	3	2	63
7	(Belgium) Laurens Sweeck	ERA Real Estate–Murprotec; ERA–Murprotec	11	6	9	5	11	5	5	Ret	60
8	(Netherlands) Mathieu van der Poel	BKCP–Powerplus	DNS	DNS	DNS	DNS	12	1	1	1	49
9	(Netherlands) Corné van Kessel	Telenet–Fidea	15	Ret	7	11	5	8	19	8	42
10	(Belgium) Tim Merlier	Sunweb–Napoleon Games	3	19	10	8	10	12	13	Ret	40
11	(Belgium) Toon Aerts	Telenet–Fidea	19	14	17	13	6	18	6	5	36
12	(Belgium) Rob Peeters	Vastgoedservice–Golden Palace	9	2	Ret	9	16	25	17	Ret	28
13	(Belgium) Gianni Vermeersch	Sunweb–Napoleon Games	6	17	Ret	12	14	15	15	11	23
14	(Netherlands) David van der Poel	BKCP–Powerplus	22	7	25	24	13	26	8	22	20
15	(Belgium) Diether Sweeck	ERA Real Estate–Murprotec; ERA–Murprotec	18	11	8	16	Ret	16	DNS	10	19
16	(Switzerland) Julien Taramarcaz	ERA Real Estate–Murprotec; ERA–Murprotec	10	8	Ret	17	DNS	11	24	Ret	19
13	(Netherlands) Thijs van Amerongen	Telenet–Fidea	DSQ	13	18	14	7	22	18	20	18
14	(Belgium) Jim Aernouts	Sunweb–Napoleon Games	DNS	15	Ret	19	DNS	DNS	10	9	14
15	(Belgium) Joeri Adams	Vastgoedservice–Golden Palace	23	12	13	20	Ret	19	14	12	13
16	(Belgium) Vincent Baestaens	BKCP–Powerplus	8	16	DNS	Ret	18	30	16	13	11
17	(Germany) Philipp Walsleben	BKCP–Powerplus	12	Ret	20	Ret	DNS	9	DNS	17	11
18	(Czech Republic) Michael Boros	BKCP–Powerplus	21	18	22	10	DNS	13	22	25	9
19	(Belgium) Michael Vanthourenhout	Sunweb–Napoleon Games	DNS	DNS	Ret	7	DNS	DNS			9
20	(Belgium) Jens Adams	Vastgoedservice–Golden Palace	25	9	16	18	DNS	DNS			7
21	(France) Clément Venturini	Cofidis	DNS	DNS	11	DNS	DNS	14			7
22	(Czech Republic) Radomír Šimůnek	ERA Real Estate–Murprotec; ERA–Murprotec	28	23	Ret	22	Ret	17	12		4
23	(Germany) Marcel Meisen	Team Kuota-Lotto	26	Ret	14	15	15	24			4
24	(Belgium) Jens Vandekinderen	Kalas-Noff	DNS	21	12	21	DNS	50	20	24	4
25	(Netherlands) Niels Wubben	Telenet–Fidea	13	22	21	25	19	20	DNS	23	3
26	(Belgium) Sven Vanthourenhout	Crelan-AA Drink	14	Ret	19	DNS	20	29	23	21	2
27	(Netherlands) Stan Godrie	Rabobank Development Team	20	20	15	27	17	21	21	28	1
28	(United States) Stephen Hyde		DNS	DNS	DNS	DNS	DNS	DNS	26	15	1
Pos.	Rider	Team	GIE	ZON	RUD	GAV	SPA	DIE	HOO	MID	Points

1. Thijs van Amerongen finished in 12th place in the Superprestige Gieten but was later disqualified as UCI regulations did not allow the small camera with was mounted onto his bike during the race. The organisation of the superprestige agreed to hand him 4 points as if he had finished 12th position.
