= 2021 Amstel Gold Race =

Cycling race

2021 UCI World Tour, race 14 of 29
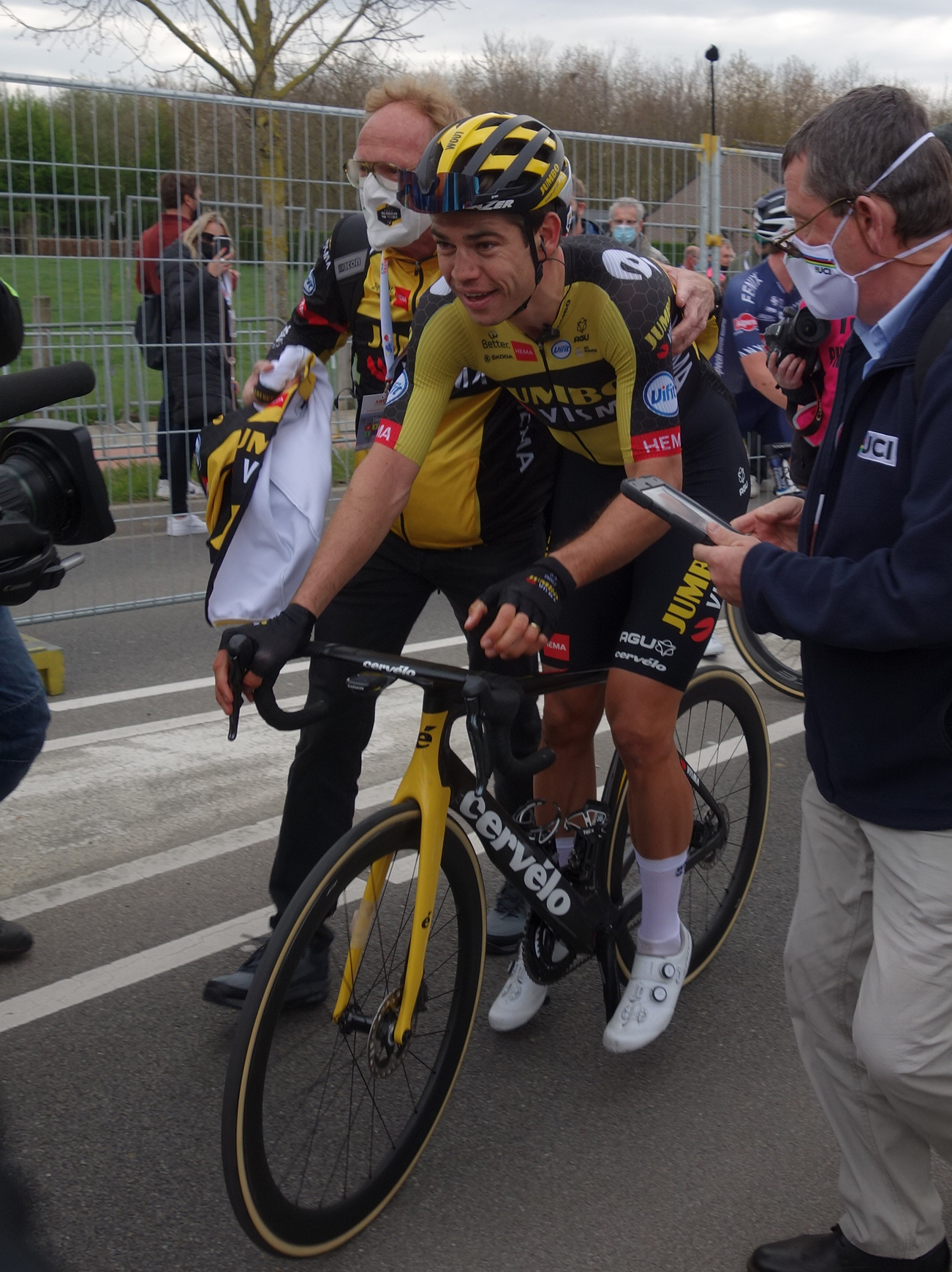
- Wout Van Aert after winning the race

Race details
- Dates: 18 April 2021
- Stages: 1
- Distance: 221 km (137.3 mi)
- Winning time: 5h 03' 27"

Results
	Winner	Wout van Aert (BEL)	(Team Jumbo–Visma)
	Second	Tom Pidcock (GBR)	(Ineos Grenadiers)
	Third	Maximilian Schachmann (GER)	(Bora–Hansgrohe)

The 2021 Amstel Gold Race was a road cycling one-day race that took place on 18 April 2021 in the Netherlands. It was the 55th edition of the Amstel Gold Race and the 14th event of the 2021 UCI World Tour. Although Wout van Aert was declared to have defeated Tom Pidcock in a photofinish sprint with Maximilian Schachmann completing the podium, it was speculated that the photofinish camera had been focused on a point approximately 26.86 cm forward of the true finish line, making the true victor unclear.

== Teams ==
Twenty-five teams were invited to the race, including all nineteen UCI WorldTeams and six UCI ProTeams.

UCI WorldTeams

- AG2R Citroën Team
- Astana–Premier Tech
- Bora–Hansgrohe
- Cofidis
- Deceuninck–Quick-Step
- EF Education–Nippo
- Groupama–FDJ
- Ineos Grenadiers
- Intermarché–Wanty–Gobert Matériaux
- Israel Start-Up Nation
- Lotto–Soudal
- Movistar Team
- Team Bahrain Victorious
- Team BikeExchange
- Team DSM
- Team Jumbo–Visma
- Team Qhubeka Assos
- Trek–Segafredo
- UAE Team Emirates

UCI ProTeams

- Alpecin–Fenix
- Arkéa–Samsic
- Bingoal Pauwels Sauces WB
- Gazprom–RusVelo
- Sport Vlaanderen–Baloise
- Uno-X Pro Cycling Team

== Result ==
Result
Rank	Rider	Team	Time
1	Wout van Aert (BEL)	Team Jumbo–Visma	5h 03' 27"
2	Tom Pidcock (GBR)	Ineos Grenadiers	+ 0"
3	Maximilian Schachmann (GER)	Bora–Hansgrohe	+ 0"
4	Michael Matthews (AUS)	Team BikeExchange	+ 3"
5	Alejandro Valverde (ESP)	Movistar Team	+ 3"
6	Julian Alaphilippe (FRA)	Deceuninck–Quick-Step	+ 3"
7	Kristian Sbaragli (ITA)	Alpecin–Fenix	+ 3"
8	Matej Mohorič (SLO)	Team Bahrain Victorious	+ 3"
9	Michał Kwiatkowski (POL)	Ineos Grenadiers	+ 3"
10	Tosh Van Der Sande (BEL)	Lotto–Soudal	+ 3"
