= 2023 Coppa Bernocchi =

- 2023 UCI ProSeries

Race details
- Dates: 2 October 2023
- Stages: 1
- Distance: 186.6 km (115.9 mi)

Results
	Winner	Wout van Aert (BEL)	(Team Jumbo–Visma)
	Second	Vincenzo Albanese (ITA)	(Eolo–Kometa)
	Third	Andrea Bagioli (ITA)	(Soudal–Quick-Step)

The 2023 Coppa Bernocchi (also known as the Coppa Bernocchi – GP Banco BPM for sponsorship reasons) was the 104th edition of the Coppa Bernocchi road cycling one day race, which was held in and around Legnano, Italy, on 2 October 2023.

== Teams ==
Thirteen UCI WorldTeams, eight UCI ProTeams, and two UCI Continental teams make up the 21 teams that participate in the race.

UCI WorldTeams

- AG2R Citroën Team
- Alpecin–Deceuninck
- Astana Qazaqstan Team
- Bora–Hansgrohe
- Cofidis
- Groupama–FDJ
- Intermarché–Circus–Wanty
- Lidl–Trek
- Movistar Team
- Soudal–Quick-Step
- Team Jayco–AlUla
- Team Jumbo–Visma
- UAE Team Emirates

UCI ProTeams

- Bingoal WB
- Eolo–Kometa
- Green Project–Bardiani–CSF–Faizanè
- Israel–Premier Tech
- Lotto–Dstny
- Q36.5 Pro Cycling Team
- Team Corratec–Selle Italia
- Team TotalEnergies

UCI Continental Teams

- Beltrami TSA–Tre Colli
- GW Shimano–Sidermec

== Result ==
Result
Rank	Rider	Team	Time
1	Wout van Aert (BEL)	Team Jumbo–Visma	4h 09' 52"
2	Vincenzo Albanese (ITA)	Eolo–Kometa	+ 0"
3	Andrea Bagioli (ITA)	Soudal–Quick-Step	+ 0"
4	Marc Hirschi (SUI)	UAE Team Emirates	+ 0"
5	Fausto Masnada (ITA)	Soudal–Quick-Step	+ 0"
6	Tiesj Benoot (BEL)	Team Jumbo–Visma	+ 2"
7	Cristian Scaroni (ITA)	Astana Qazaqstan Team	+ 5"
8	Julian Alaphilippe (FRA)	Soudal–Quick-Step	+ 11"
9	Jan Tratnik (SLO)	Team Jumbo–Visma	+ 14"
10	Ion Izagirre (ESP)	Cofidis	+ 1' 30"
