= 2022 Bretagne Classic Ouest-France =

One-day cycling race in France

2022 Bretagne Classic Ouest–France
2022 UCI World Tour, race 28 of 31

Race details
- Dates: 28 August 2022
- Stages: 1
- Distance: 254.8 km (158.3 mi)
- Winning time: 6h 04' 22"

Results
	Winner	Wout van Aert (BEL)	(Team Jumbo–Visma)
	Second	Axel Laurance (FRA)	(B&B Hotels–KTM)
	Third	Alexander Kamp (DEN)	(Trek–Segafredo)

The 2022 Bretagne Classic Ouest–France was a road cycling one-day race that took place on 28 August 2022 in the region of Brittany in northwestern France. It was the 86th edition of the Bretagne Classic Ouest–France and the 28th event of the 2022 UCI World Tour. It was won by Wout van Aert in a group sprint.

== Teams ==
All eighteen UCI WorldTeams and six UCI ProTeams made up the twenty-four teams that participated in the race.

UCI WorldTeams

- AG2R Citroën Team
- Astana Qazaqstan Team
- Bora–Hansgrohe
- Cofidis
- EF Education–EasyPost
- Groupama–FDJ
- Ineos Grenadiers
- Intermarché–Wanty–Gobert Matériaux
- Israel–Premier Tech
- Lotto–Soudal
- Movistar Team
- Quick-Step Alpha Vinyl Team
- Team Bahrain Victorious
- Team BikeExchange–Jayco
- Team DSM
- Team Jumbo–Visma
- Trek–Segafredo
- UAE Team Emirates

UCI ProTeams

- Arkéa–Samsic
- B&B Hotels–KTM
- Bardiani–CSF–Faizanè
- Bingoal Pauwels Sauces WB
- Team TotalEnergies
- Uno-X Pro Cycling Team

== Result ==
Result
Rank	Rider	Team	Time
1	Wout van Aert (BEL)	Team Jumbo–Visma	6h 04' 22"
2	Axel Laurance (FRA)	B&B Hotels–KTM	+ 0"
3	Alexander Kamp (DEN)	Trek–Segafredo	+ 0"
4	Arnaud De Lie (BEL)	Lotto–Soudal	+ 0"
5	Filippo Fiorelli (ITA)	Bardiani–CSF–Faizanè	+ 0"
6	Biniam Girmay (ERI)	Intermarché–Wanty–Gobert Matériaux	+ 0"
7	Oliver Naesen (BEL)	AG2R Citroën Team	+ 0"
8	Benjamin Thomas (FRA)	Cofidis	+ 0"
9	Toms Skujiņš (LAT)	Trek–Segafredo	+ 0"
10	Andrea Piccolo (ITA)	EF Education–EasyPost	+ 0"
