= 2023 European Road Championships – Men's road race =

Men's elite road race
2023 European Road Championships

Race details
- Dates: 24 September 2023
- Stages: 1
- Distance: 199.8 km (124.1 mi)
- Winning time: 4:15:50

Medalists
	Gold	Christophe Laporte (FRA)
	Silver	Wout van Aert (BEL)
	Bronze	Olav Kooij (NED)

The men's elite road race at the 2023 European Road Championships took place on 24 September 2023, in Drenthe, Netherlands. The race was won by French cyclist Christophe Laporte.

== Results ==
Rank	#	Cyclist	Nation	Time	Diff.
1st place, gold medalist(s)	35	Christophe Laporte	France	4:15:50	
2nd place, silver medalist(s)	2	Wout van Aert	Belgium	s.t.	
3rd place, bronze medalist(s)	52	Olav Kooij	Netherlands	s.t.	
4	4	Arnaud De Lie	Belgium	s.t.	
5	56	Mike Teunissen	Netherlands	4:15:59	00:09
6	83	Rasmus Tiller	Norway	s.t.	
7	15	Mads Pedersen	Denmark	4:16:03	00:13
8	84	John Degenkolb	Germany	4:16:05	00:15
9	13	Andreas Kron	Denmark	4:16:29	00:39
10	38	Florian Sénéchal	France	4:16:31	00:41
11	47	Iván García Cortina	Spain	s.t.	
12	6	Jasper Stuyven	Belgium	s.t.	
13	98	Toms Skujiņš	Latvia	s.t.	
14	63	Matteo Trentin	Italy	s.t.	
15	31	Ethan Vernon	Great Britain	s.t.	
16	87	Jonas Koch	Germany	s.t.	
17	1	Yves Lampaert	Belgium	4:16:36	00:46
18	73	Nelson Oliveira	Portugal	4:16:39	00:49
19	82	Erik Resell	Norway	4:16:43	00:53
20	85	Felix Engelhardt	Germany	s.t.	
21	121	Omer Goldstein	Israel	4:16:45	00:55
22	34	Sandy Dujardin	France	4:16:59	01:09
23	50	Daan Hoole	Netherlands	4:17:01	01:11
24	30	Ben Turner	Great Britain	4:17:36	01:46
25	32	Samuel Watson	Great Britain	4:17:45	01:55
26	94	Tobias Bayer	Austria	4:17:50	02:00
27	80	Martin Urianstad	Norway	4:17:52	02:02
28	115	Karl Patrick Lauk	Estonia	s.t.	
29	39	Anthony Turgis	France	4:17:59	02:09
30	49	Sjoerd Bax	Netherlands	4:18:05	02:15
31	26	Lewis Askey	Great Britain	4:18:59	03:09
32	27	Sean Flynn	Great Britain	s.t.	
33	90	Max Walscheid	Germany	s.t.	
34	72	Ivo Oliveira	Portugal	4:19:15	03:25
35	60	Matteo Sobrero	Italy	4:19:21	03:31
36	62	Andrea Pasqualon	Italy	s.t.	
37	59	Filippo Ganna	Italy	s.t.	
38	117	Markus Pajur	Estonia	4:20:03	04:13
39	111	Lukáš Kubiš	Slovakia	s.t.	
40	45	Imanol Erviti	Spain	4:20:07	04:17
41	138	Mauro Schmid	Switzerland	s.t.	
42	61	Luca Mozzato	Italy	4:20:14	04:24
43	109	Erik Fetter	Hungary	4:20:34	04:44
44	64	Elia Viviani	Italy	4:20:49	04:59
45	16	Casper Pedersen	Denmark	4:21:18	05:28
46	54	Elmar Reinders	Netherlands	s.t.	
47	120	Itamar Einhorn	Israel	4:21:19	05:29
48	68	Fabian Lienhard	Switzerland	4:21:25	05:35
49	108	Matěj Zahálka	Czech Republic	4:22:06	06:16
50	22	Jaka Primožič	Slovenia	s.t.	
51	43	Jon Barrenetxea	Spain	s.t.	
52	95	Sebastian Schönberger	Austria	s.t.	
53	101	Filip Maciejuk	Poland	s.t.	
54	48	David González	Spain	4:22:09	06:19
55	42	Fernando Barceló	Spain	s.t.	
56	125	Kyrylo Tsarenko	Ukraine	s.t.	
57	75	André Carvalho	Portugal	4:22:14	06:24
58	46	Jesús Ezquerra	Spain	s.t.	
59	129	Ignatas Konovalovas	Lithuania	s.t.	
60	97	Mārtiņš Pluto	Latvia	s.t.	
61	106	Mathias Vacek	Czech Republic	4:22:16	06:26
62	103	Cesare Benedetti	Poland	s.t.	
63	93	Rainer Kepplinger	Austria	s.t.	
64	128	Dušan Rajović	Serbia	s.t.	
65	51	Nils Eekhoff	Netherlands	4:22:19	06:29
66	78	Andreas Leknessund	Norway	s.t.	
67	99	Piotr Brożyna	Poland	4:22:22	06:32
68	11	Christopher Juul-Jensen	Denmark	4:22:28	06:38
69	29	Mark Stewart	Great Britain	s.t.	
70	14	Michael Mørkøv	Denmark	s.t.	
71	66	Johan Jacobs	Switzerland	4:22:52	07:02
72	70	Michael Schär	Switzerland	4:22:56	07:06
73	33	Arnaud Démare	France	4:23:02	07:12
74	65	Stefan Bissegger	Switzerland	4:23:12	07:22
75	28	Luke Rowe	Great Britain	s.t.	
76	58	Mattia Cattaneo	Italy	s.t.	
77	8	Florian Vermeersch	Belgium	s.t.	
78	81	Jonas Iversby Hvideberg	Norway	4:24:21	08:31
79	89	Miguel Heidemann	Germany	s.t.	
80	67	Reto Hollenstein	Switzerland	s.t.	
81	17	Tilen Finkšt	Slovenia	s.t.	
82	23	Anže Skok	Slovenia	s.t.	
83	44	Víctor de la Parte	Spain	s.t.	
84	69	Lukas Rüegg	Switzerland	s.t.	
85	77	João Matias	Portugal	s.t.	
86	71	Félix Stehli	Switzerland	s.t.	
87	10	Tobias Lund Andresen	Denmark	4:24:47	08:57
DNF	5	Tim Declercq	Belgium		
DNF	7	Edward Theuns	Belgium		
DNF	9	Mikkel Bjerg	Denmark		
DNF	12	Mathias Norsgaard	Denmark		
DNF	19	Aljaž Jarc	Slovenia		
DNF	20	Kristijan Koren	Slovenia		
DNF	24	Mihael Štajnar	Slovenia		
DNF	25	Josh Tarling	Great Britain		
DNF	36	Matis Louvel	France		
DNF	37	Clément Russo	France		
DNF	40	Axel Zingle	France		
DNF	41	Xabier Azparren	Spain		
DNF	53	Bauke Mollema	Netherlands		
DNF	55	Cees Bol	Netherlands		
DNF	57	Edoardo Affini	Italy		
DNF	76	Iúri Leitão	Portugal		
DNF	86	Kim Heiduk	Germany		
DNF	88	Michael Schwarzmann	Germany		
DNF	91	Dillon Corkery	Ireland		
DNF	92	Rory Townsend	Ireland		
DNF	100	Michał Kwiatkowski	Poland		
DNF	102	Stanisław Aniołkowski	Poland		
DNF	104	Marceli Bogusławski	Poland		
DNF	105	Maciej Paterski	Poland		
DNF	110	Dávid Kaško	Slovakia		
DNF	112	Andrej Líška	Slovakia		
DNF	113	Marek Čanecký	Slovakia		
DNF	116	Oskar Nisu	Estonia		
DNF	118	Norman Vahtra	Estonia		
DNF	119	Rait Ärm	Estonia		
DNF	122	Guy Sagiv	Israel		
DNF	123	Ahmet Örken	Turkey		
DNF	124	Serdar Anıl Depe	Turkey		
DNF	126	Yan Pastushenko	Ukraine		
DNF	127	Yaroslav Parashchak	Ukraine		
DNF	130	Viktor Potočki	Croatia		
DNF	131	Samir Hasani	Kosovo		
DNF	132	Blerton Nuha	Kosovo		
DNF	133	Mikel Demiri	Albania		
DNF	134	Olsian Velia	Albania		
DNF	135	Stefan Petrovski	North Macedonia		
DNF	136	Goran Cerović	Montenegro		
DNF	137	Ingvar Ómarsson	Iceland		
DNS	3	Jasper De Buyst	Belgium		
DNS	18	Matevž Govekar	Slovenia		
DNS	21	Luka Mezgec	Slovenia		
DNS	79	Søren Wærenskjold	Norway		
DNS	96	Emīls Liepiņš	Latvia		
DNS	107	Petr Kelemen	Czech Republic		
DNS	114	Matúš Štoček	Slovakia		
