= 2013 UCI Cyclo-cross World Championships – Men's under-23 race =

Men's Under-23 Cyclo-cross Race
2013 UCI Cyclo-cross World Championships
- Rainbow jersey

Race details
- Dates: February 2, 2013
- Stages: 1
- Distance: 19.58 km (12.17 mi)
- Winning time: 48' 40"

Medalists
	Gold	Mike Teunissen (Netherlands)
	Silver	Wietse Bosmans (Belgium)
	Bronze	Wout van Aert (Belgium)

This event was held on February 2, 2013, as part of the 2013 UCI Cyclo-cross World Championships. Mike Teunissen won the race after a strong last lap, leaving Wietse Bosmans, the pre-race favourite, stuck on a second spot. First year U23, Wout Van Aert, managed to impress by grabbing the third spot on the podium.

== Results ==
Rank	Cyclist	Time
Gold medal	Mike Teunissen (NED)	48' 40"
Silver medal	Wietse Bosmans (BEL)	+ 14"
Bronze medal	Wout van Aert (BEL)	+ 22"
4	Tijmen Eising (NED)	+ 35"
5	Jens Adams (BEL)	+ 38"
6	Laurens Sweeck (BEL)	+ 54"
7	Michiel van der Heijden (NED)	+ 1' 05"
8	Michael Vanthourenhout (BEL)	+ 1' 15"
9	Corné van Kessel (NED)	+ 1' 29"
10	Gianni Vermeersch (BEL)	+ 1' 34"
11	Zach McDonald (USA)	+ 1' 42"
12	Kenneth Hansen (DEN)	+ 1' 50"
13	Michael Schweizer (GER)	+ 1' 54"
14	David Menut (FRA)	+ 1' 57"
15	Jonathan Lastra (ESP)	+ 1' 58"
16	Yannick Eckmann (GER)	+ 1' 58"
17	Vojtěch Nipl (CZE)	+ 2' 16"
18	Jakub Skála (CZE)	+ 2' 37"
19	Lars Forster (SUI)	+ 2' 48"
20	David van der Poel (NED)	+ 3' 00"
21	Clément Venturini (FRA)	+ 3' 04"
22	Julian Alaphilippe (FRA)	+ 3' 20"
23	Lukas Müller (SUI)	+ 3' 29"
24	Michael Boroš (CZE)	+ 3' 33"
25	Andrew Dillman (USA)	+ 3' 40"
26	Fabian Lienhard (SUI)	+ 3' 56"
27	Severin Sägesser (SUI)	+ 4' 03"
28	Tomáš Paprstka (CZE)	+ 4' 07"
29	Josh Johnson (USA)	+ 4' 19"
30	Steven James (GBR)	+ 5' 06"
31	Michael van den Ham (CAN)	+ 5' 17"
32	Hugo Robinson (GBR)	+ 5' 19"
33	Adam Martin (GBR)	+ 5' 47"
34	Michimasa Nakai (JPN)	+ 6' 02"
35	Andrew L'Esperance (CAN)	+ 6' 16"
36	Kohei Maeda (JPN)	1 LAP
37	Skyler Trujillo (USA)	1 LAP
38	Conor O'Brien (CAN)	2 LAPS
39	Tobin Ortenblad (USA)	3 LAPS
	Evan McNeely (CAN)	DNF
	Emiel Dolfsma (NED)	DNF
	Daniele Braidot (ITA)	DNF
