= 2022 E3 Saxo Bank Classic =

Cycling race

2022 UCI World Tour, race 9 of 32

Race details
- Dates: 25 March 2022
- Stages: 1
- Distance: 203.9 km (126.7 mi)
- Winning time: 4h 38' 04"

Results
	Winner	Wout van Aert (BEL)	(Team Jumbo–Visma)
	Second	Christophe Laporte (FRA)	(Team Jumbo–Visma)
	Third	Stefan Küng (SUI)	(Groupama–FDJ)

The 2022 E3 Saxo Bank Classic was a road cycling one-day race that took place on 25 March 2022 in Belgium. It was the 64th edition of the E3 Saxo Bank Classic, and the 9th event of the 2022 UCI World Tour.

== Teams ==
Twenty-five teams were invited to the race, including all eighteen UCI WorldTeams and seven UCI ProTeams.

UCI WorldTeams

- AG2R Citroën Team
- Astana Qazaqstan Team
- Bora–Hansgrohe
- Cofidis
- Quick-Step Alpha Vinyl Team
- EF Education–EasyPost
- Groupama–FDJ
- INEOS Grenadiers
- Intermarché–Wanty–Gobert Matériaux
- Israel–Premier Tech
- Lotto–Soudal
- Movistar Team
- Team Bahrain Victorious
- Team BikeExchange–Jayco
- Team DSM
- Team Jumbo–Visma
- Trek–Segafredo
- UAE Team Emirates

UCI ProTeams

- Alpecin–Fenix
- Bardiani–CSF–Faizanè
- B&B Hotels–KTM
- Bingoal Pauwels Sauces WB
- Sport Vlaanderen–Baloise
- Team TotalEnergies
- Uno-X Pro Cycling Team

== Result ==
Result
Rank	Rider	Team	Time
1	Wout van Aert (BEL)	Team Jumbo–Visma	4h 38' 04"
2	Christophe Laporte (FRA)	Team Jumbo–Visma	+ 0"
3	Stefan Küng (SUI)	Groupama–FDJ	+ 1' 35"
4	Matej Mohorič (SLO)	Team Bahrain Victorious	+ 1' 36"
5	Biniam Girmay (ERI)	Intermarché–Wanty–Gobert Matériaux	+ 1' 36"
6	Valentin Madouas (FRA)	Groupama–FDJ	+ 1' 36"
7	Jhonatan Narváez (ECU)	INEOS Grenadiers	+ 1' 36"
8	Tiesj Benoot (BEL)	Team Jumbo–Visma	+ 1' 36"
9	Dylan van Baarle (NED)	INEOS Grenadiers	+ 1' 36"
10	Kasper Asgreen (DEN)	Quick-Step Alpha Vinyl Team	+ 1' 36"
