= Wout van Aert =

Belgian cyclist (born 1994)

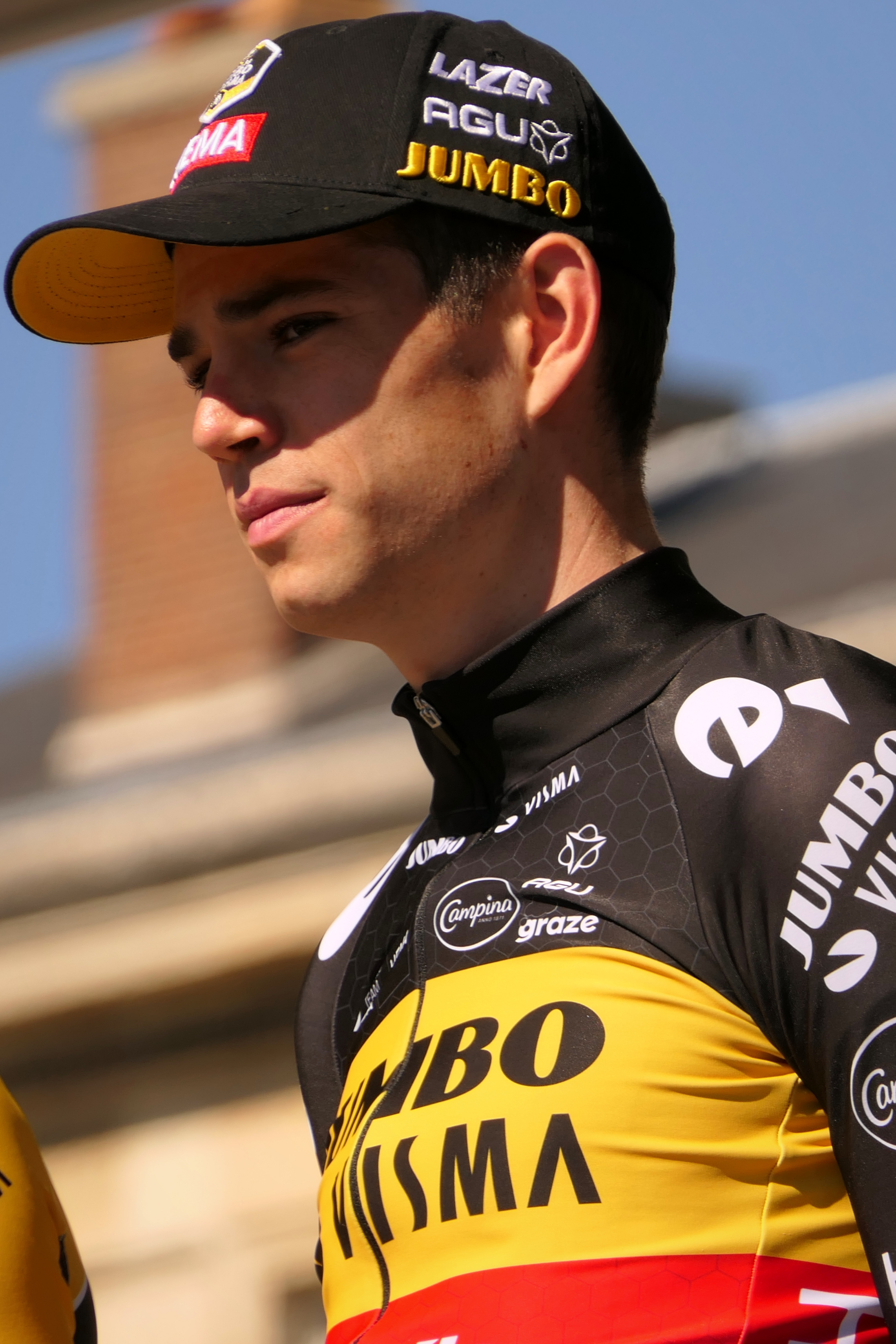
- Van Aert at the 2022 Paris–Roubaix

Personal information
- Full name: Wout van Aert
- Born: 15 September 1994 (age 32) Herentals, Belgium
- Height: 1.90 m (6 ft 3 in)
- Weight: 78 kg (172 lb)

Cycling career
- Sport: Cycling
- Current team: Visma–Lease a Bike
- Disciplines: Cyclo-cross; Road
- Role: Rider
- Rider type: Sprinter; All-rounder (road); Rouleur; Time trialist Classics specialist

Amateur team
- 2018–2019: Cibel–Cebon Offroad Team

Professional teams
- 2013: Telenet–Fidea
- 2014–2016: Vastgoedservice–Golden Palace
- 2017–2018: Vérandas Willems–Crelan
- 2019–: Team Jumbo–Visma

Major wins
- Cyclo-cross World Championships (2016, 2017, 2018) National Championships (2016, 2017, 2018, 2021, 2022) World Cup (2015–16, 2016–17, 2020–21) 17 individual wins (2014–15—2018–19, 2020–21—2024–25) Trophy (2014–15, 2015–16, 2016–17) Superprestige (2015–16) Road Grand Tours Tour de France Points classification (2022) 10 individual stages (2019—2022, 2025) 1 TTT stage (2019) Combativity award (2022) Giro d’Italia 1 individual stage (2025) Vuelta a España Points classification (2026) 5 individual stages (2024, 2026) Combativity award (2026) Stage races Tour of Britain (2021, 2023) Danmark Rundt (2018, 2026) One-day races and Classics National Time Trial Championships (2019, 2020, 2023) National Road Race Championships (2021) Milan–San Remo (2020) Paris–Roubaix (2026) E3 Saxo Bank Classic (2022, 2023) Strade Bianche (2020) Gent–Wevelgem (2021) Amstel Gold Race (2021) Omloop Het Nieuwsblad (2022) Bretagne Classic (2022) Coppa Bernocchi (2023) Kuurne–Brussels–Kuurne (2024)
Medal record
Representing Belgium
Men's cyclo-cross
World Championships
Gold medal – first place	2014 Hoogerheide	Under-23
Gold medal – first place	2016 Heusden-Zolder	Elite
Gold medal – first place	2017 Bieles	Elite
Gold medal – first place	2018 Valkenburg	Elite
Silver medal – second place	2012 Koksijde	Junior
Silver medal – second place	2015 Tabor	Elite
Silver medal – second place	2019 Bogense	Elite
Silver medal – second place	2021 Ostend	Elite
Silver medal – second place	2023 Hoogerheide	Elite
Silver medal – second place	2025 Liévin	Elite
Bronze medal – third place	2013 Louisville	Under-23
European Championships
Gold medal – first place	2014 Lorsch	Under-23
Silver medal – second place	2015 Huijbergen	Elite
Silver medal – second place	2018 Rosmalen	Elite
Bronze medal – third place	2016 Pontchâteau	Elite
Men's road bicycle racing
Olympic Games
Silver medal – second place	2020 Tokyo	Road race
Bronze medal – third place	2024 Paris	Time trial
World Championships
Silver medal – second place	2020 Imola	Road race
Silver medal – second place	2020 Imola	Time trial
Silver medal – second place	2021 Flanders	Time trial
Silver medal – second place	2023 Glasgow	Road race
European Championships
Silver medal – second place	2023 Drenthe	Road race
Bronze medal – third place	2018 Glasgow	Road race
Bronze medal – third place	2023 Drenthe	Time trial

Wout van Aert (born 15 September 1994) is a Belgian professional road and cyclo-cross racer who rides for UCI WorldTeam Visma–Lease a Bike. Van Aert won three consecutive men's races at the UCI Cyclo-cross World Championships in 2016, 2017, and 2018.

Having initially prioritised competing in cyclo-cross, Van Aert terminated his contract with Vérandas Willems–Crelan in 2018 and joined Team Jumbo–Visma in March 2019, on a three-year deal. Van Aert has since taken more than fifty professional road wins, including ten stage victories at the Tour de France between 2019 and 2025 (also winning the points classification in 2022), and two Monuments: Milan–San Remo (2020) and Paris-Roubaix (2026). Despite his many victories, van Aert's career has been noted for several close second place or podium finishes, with missed victories attributed to bad luck. As of April 2026, van Aert has seven second or third-place finishes in Monuments, and eleven silver or bronze medals across the Road and Cyclo-cross World Championships, and Olympics.

Following the 2022 Tour de France, where Van Aert won three stages, several media outlets labeled him as "one of the most complete cyclists of his generation". His rivalry with Mathieu van der Poel in cyclo-cross is considered among the greatest and longest lasting rivalries in the sport.

== Career ==
=== Early career ===
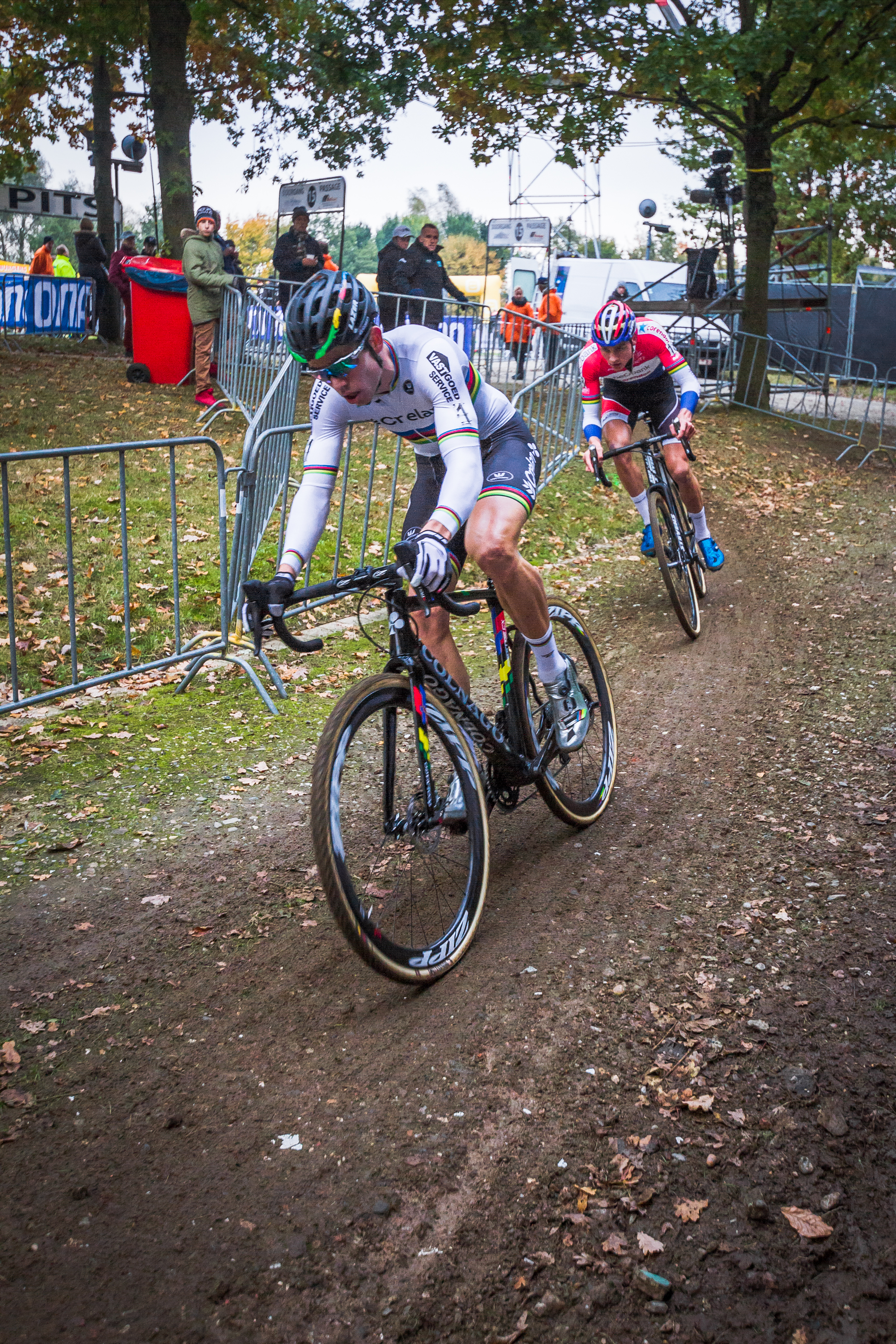
van Aert (left) and Mathieu van der Poel (right) at the 2016 UCI Cyclocross World Cup. Valkenburg, Netherlands, 2016.

Van Aert was born in Herentals, Flanders, into a family not involved in bike racing. One of his father's cousins is Dutch former professional cyclist Jos van Aert. He started his career in cyclo-cross where he became World champion (2016, 2017, 2018) and Belgian champion (2016, 2017, 2018, 2021, 2022).

He rode the 2018 Strade Bianche, held partly on gravel roads in torrential rain. He broke away with Romain Bardet (AG2R La Mondiale) and the pair led the race for much of the final 40 kilometres (25 miles) before Tiesj Benoot (Lotto–Soudal) attacked from a chasing group to catch and then drop them in the final sector of dirt roads. Benoot soloed to victory by 39 seconds ahead of Bardet, who dropped Van Aert in the final kilometre; Van Aert ultimately finished third, 19 seconds behind, despite falling on the final climb in Siena.

Over a two-year period with Vérandas Willems–Crelan in 2017 and 2018, he took five victories, and also won a bronze medal at the 2018 European Road Cycling Championships in Glasgow, losing out to Matteo Trentin and Mathieu van der Poel in a sprint finish from a small group.

==== Transfer 2018–19 ====
Van Aert rode with the Vérandas Willems–Crelan team during road races in 2018. Over the year, he expressed dissatisfaction with the news that the team was set to merge with Roompot–Nederlandse Loterij for 2019. Having already signed a contract to ride with LottoNL–Jumbo from 2020 onwards, he terminated his contract with Vérandas Willems–Crelan in September 2018. Were he to join another team for 2019, Sniper Cycling – the owners of the Vérandas Willems–Crelan team – were said to be demanding €500,000 in compensation. LottoNL–Jumbo were reported to be interested in signing Van Aert a year earlier than originally agreed, and confirmation of the transfer was announced in December 2018, with Van Aert joining the team from 1 March 2019.

=== Jumbo–Visma (2019–present) ===
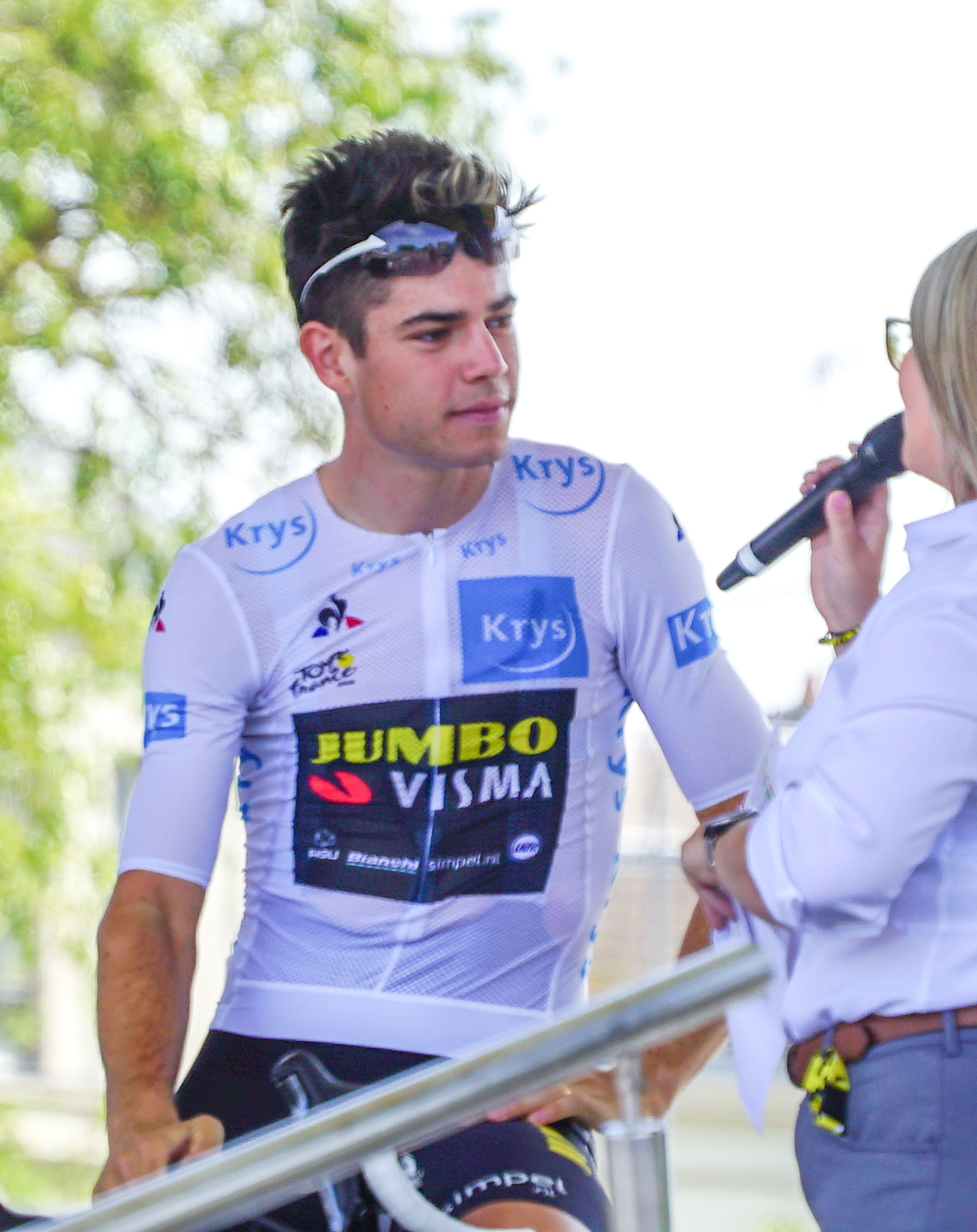
Van Aert wearing the white jersey at the 2019 Tour de France

==== 2019 – career-threatening crash ====
In June, Van Aert won two stages and the green jersey in the Critérium du Dauphiné, became national time trial champion, and won the bronze medal in the road race at the national championship. In July, he was named in the startlist for the Tour de France. On 15 July, Van Aert won Stage 10 from Saint-Flour to Albi, in a sprint finish ahead of Elia Viviani and Caleb Ewan. Four days later, he had a crash during the individual time trial stage in Pau, and was forced to abandon the race due to his injuries.

Van Aert later told newspaper Het Laatste Nieuws that the crash was so severe that it could have ended his career, worsened by a mistake during his surgery, when doctors did not properly work on one of his tendons.

It was not known at the time whether he would recover for the cyclo-cross season or even the classics at the start of the 2020 road cycling season.

In November, Van Aert won the Flandrien of the Year award.

He made his return to racing at the Azencross cyclo-cross event just after Christmas, finishing fifth.

==== 2020 – Milan San-Remo victory ====
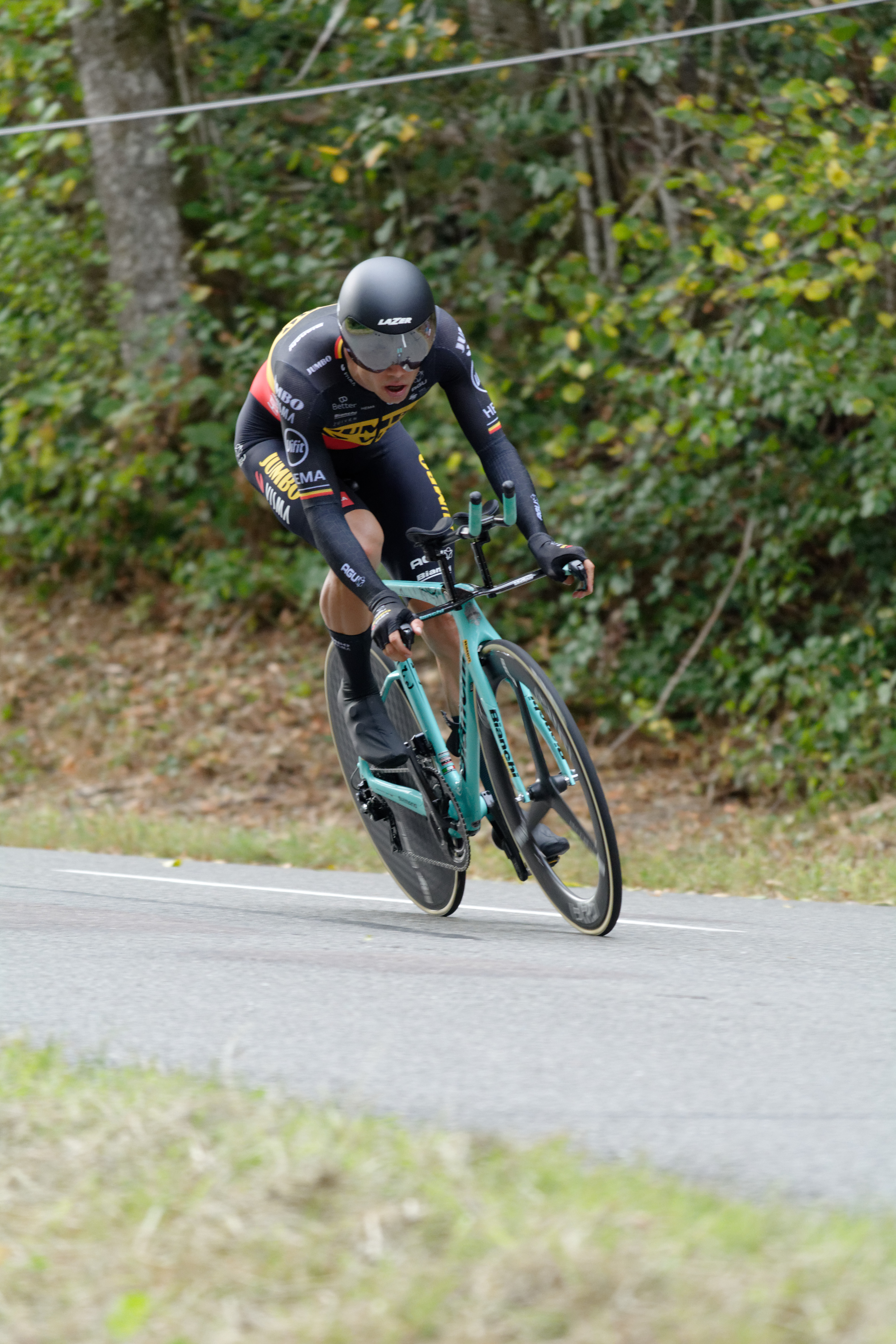
van Aert wearing the national time trial champion's jersey on Stage 20 of the 2020 Tour de France

Van Aert made his return to road racing at Omloop Het Nieuwsblad – having not been expected to ride in the race – just missing the top-ten placings in eleventh. However, this would be his only race day prior to the enforced suspension of racing due to the COVID-19 pandemic.

On 1 August, Van Aert won the first rescheduled UCI World Tour race to be held following the COVID-19 pandemic, Strade Bianche after attacking solo with around 13 kilometres (8.1 miles) remaining. The following week, Van Aert won the rescheduled Milan–San Remo after outsprinting French rider Julian Alaphilippe, the defending champion, of Deceuninck–Quick-Step, in a two-up sprint, after the duo had broken away from the peloton on the descent of the Poggio di San Remo.

On 2 September, he won the fifth stage of the Tour de France from Gap to Privas, in an uphill sprint. He also won the sprint in the seventh stage from Millau to Lavaur. At the UCI Road World Championships in Imola, Van Aert won the silver medal in both the individual time trial and in the road race.

==== 2021 – Tour de France stage win hat-trick ====
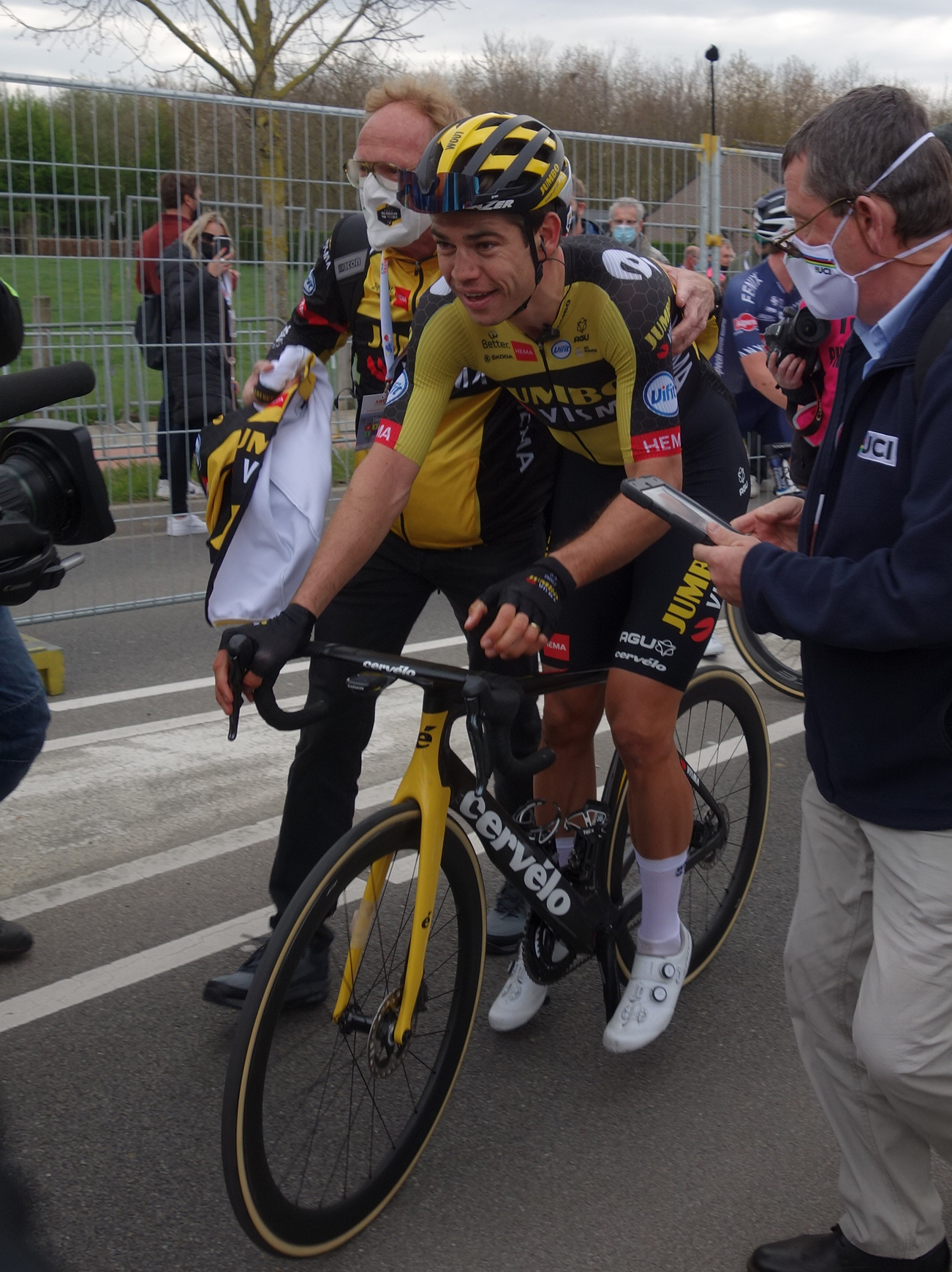
Van Aert won the 2021 Amstel Gold Race, beating Tom Pidcock in a two-up sprint, ultimately decided in a photo finish.

Van Aert started the 2021 road season on 6 March at Strade Bianche and came in fourth place.

He then rode Tirreno–Adriatico with overall aspirations, winning the opening stage in a bunch sprint ahead of elite sprinters like Caleb Ewan and Elia Viviani. After consistent and strong performances in the rest of the race, including a victory in the last stage, a 10.1-kilometre (6.3-mile) individual time trial, he managed to win the points classification and finish second in the general classification behind 2020 Tour de France winner Tadej Pogačar.

After Tirreno–Adriatico, Van Aert came third in Milan–San Remo behind Jasper Stuyven and Ewan.

On 28 March Van Aert sprinted to victory in Gent-Wevelgem after making the winning selection during the early stages of the race.

On 18 April Van Aert won the Amstel Gold Race after a two-up sprint with Tom Pidcock, which was ultimately decided by a photo finish.

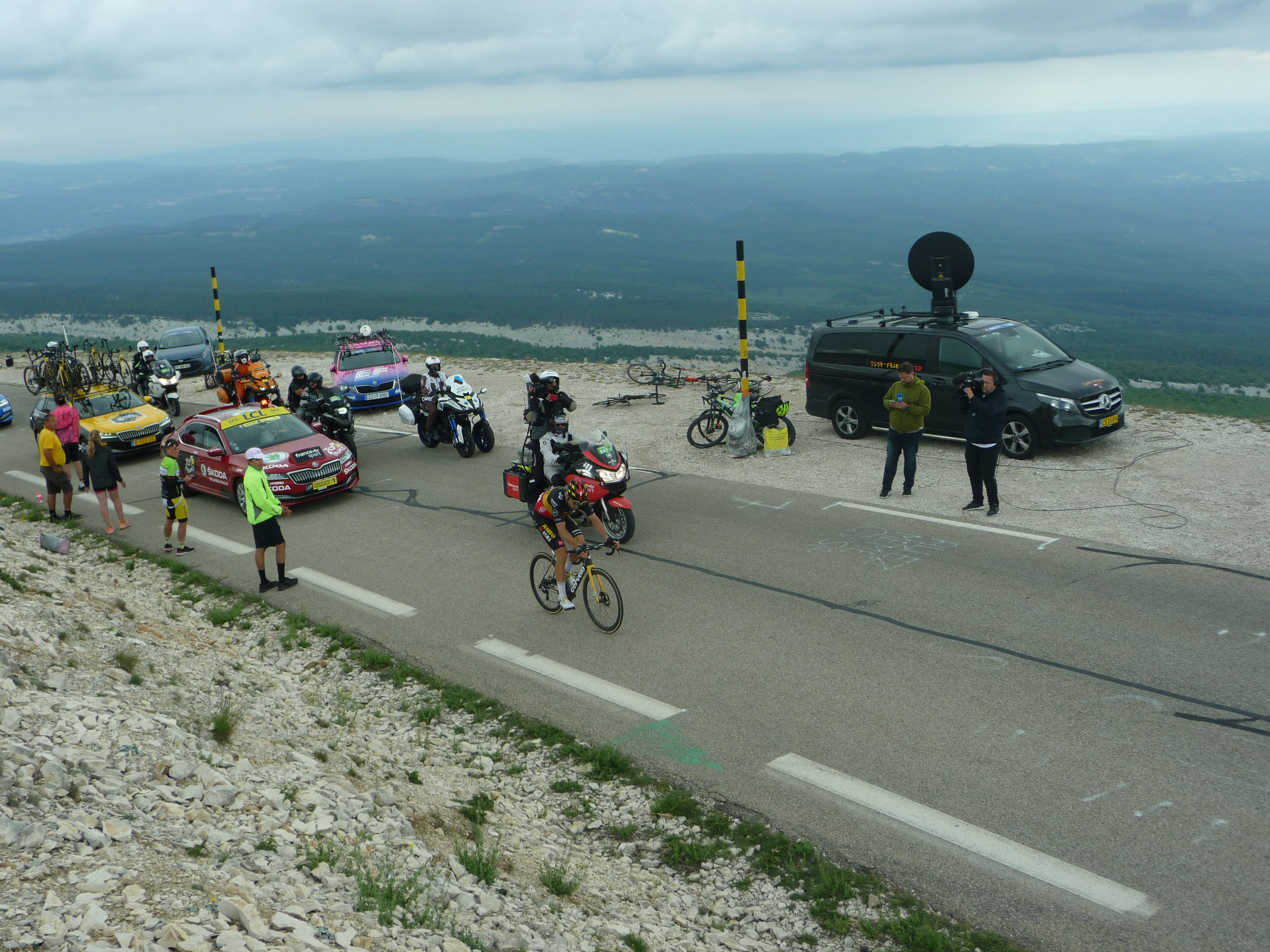
Van Aert riding to victory on Mont Ventoux on Stage 11 of the 2021 Tour de France

On 7 July Van Aert won Stage 11 of the Tour de France by attacking on the last climb of Mont Ventoux, over 32 kilometres (20 miles) from the finish. Afterwards Van Aert said this victory on such an iconic mountain stage "may be the best victory of my career". On 17 July, Van Aert won Stage 20, which was a 30.8-kilometre (19.1-mile) individual time trial, in the time of 35 minutes, 53 seconds. The following day, Van Aert won the 108.4-kilometre (67.4-mile) final stage of the race to take his third stage win at the race, crossing the finish line on the Champs-Élysées, ahead of Jasper Philipsen and Mark Cavendish. After the race, Van Aert said that his results were "priceless", as he became the first rider to win a mountain stage, an individual time trial and a bunch sprint in the same Tour since Bernard Hinault in 1979.

In the Olympic road race he finished 1 minute, 7 seconds behind winner Richard Carapaz but won the sprint in the chasing group, earning the silver medal.

In September, Van Aert won the Tour of Britain including 4 stages.

Later the same month, at the UCI Road World Championships, he earned the silver medal in the individual time trial.

==== 2022 – Tour points classification victory ====
Van Aert started the 2022 road season with a win in Omloop Het Nieuwsblad after a 13-kilometre (8.1-mile) solo attack. He then won the time trial in Paris–Nice, as well as the points classification. In the first monument of the year, Milan–San Remo, Van Aert came 8th. He then won the E3 Saxo Bank Classic in an uncontested sprint with teammate Christophe Laporte, after the duo attacked together on the Paterberg with 40 kilometres (25 miles) remaining to the finish in Harelbeke; they finished the race over 90 seconds ahead of the next group. In the lead-up to the Tour of Flanders, Van Aert tested positive for COVID-19, and missed the race along with the subsequent Amstel Gold Race. After two weeks without racing, Van Aert returned with a second place in Paris–Roubaix. A week later, he came third on his debut in the Ardennes monument Liège–Bastogne–Liège.

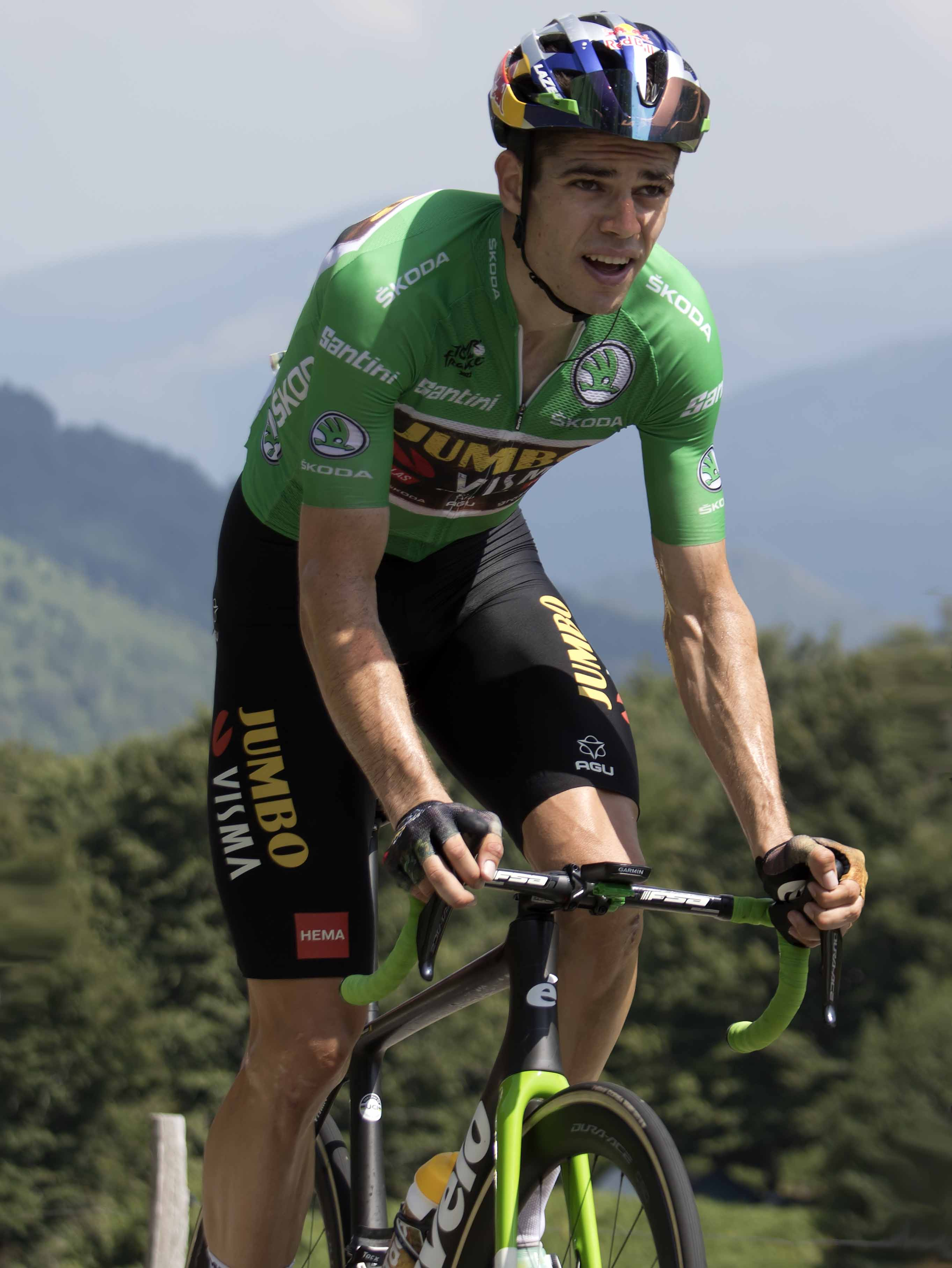
Van Aert wearing the green jersey of points classification leader at the 2022 Tour de France. He won three stages during the race, and won the points classification.

Van Aert started off the Tour de France with three second-place finishes on the three stages to be held in Denmark, and thus held the yellow and green jerseys as the race returned to French soil. Stage 4 was expected to be another bunch sprint finish, but with 10 kilometres to go Team Jumbo–Visma orchestrated an attack up the final climb of the day, the 900-metre (3,000-foot) ascent up Cote du Cap Blanc-Nez. At the top of the climb, Van Aert broke free and rode solo to the finish, with enough time in hand for a bird-like celebration as he crossed the finish line. Eurosport analyst and former professional cyclist Adam Blythe commented that he had "never seen a rider do that in the yellow jersey", and NBC Sports commentator Phil Liggett said that the attack reminded him of Eddy Merckx. He lost the yellow jersey on stage six, after forcing the breakaway with Quinn Simmons and Jakob Fuglsang (later dropping both), he was eventually caught and dropped; he was designated as the most aggressive rider on the stage.

Stage 8 looked to be a day for a breakaway to win, but Team Jumbo–Visma kept it in check and the stage ended in an uphill bunch sprint in Lausanne, with Michael Matthews and yellow jersey holder Tadej Pogačar leading it out. Van Aert at first appeared blocked in, but when a gap appeared, he surged to his second win in the race and his eighth stage win overall. Two further top-ten finishes in the second week extended his points classification lead, and early in the final week, had an unassailable lead with more than double the points of Pogačar, who was second. On stage 18, which ended with a mountaintop finish on Hautacam, Van Aert attacked at kilometre zero. He was brought back, but then attacked again in the following breakaways and essentially stayed away all day. On the final climb he broke the final two breakaway riders in Thibaut Pinot and Daniel Martínez, and assisted in the pacing for his teammate and race leader Jonas Vingegaard against Pogačar. He won the individual time trial on stage 20, and was named the race's most aggressive rider, winning the combativity award. On the final day in Paris he crossed the finish line about a minute after the sprinters, together with his surviving teammates; with Van Aert winning the green jersey and Vingegaard winning the yellow jersey, Team Jumbo–Visma became the first team to win both jerseys since German riders Jan Ullrich and Erik Zabel in 1997, with Team Telekom.

Following the Tour de France, Van Aert was outsprinted by Marco Haller in his next start, at the Hamburg Cyclassics, before he won the Bretagne Classic Ouest-France in a sprint from approximately twenty riders. He was amongst the leading riders in both the Laurentian classics held in Canada, finishing fourth in the Grand Prix Cycliste de Québec, and lost out to Pogačar in the closing metres at the Grand Prix Cycliste de Montréal. Having won the silver medal in the previous two editions of the time trial at the UCI Road World Championships, Van Aert did not contest the 2022 edition, with his sole focus in Wollongong being the road race. He ultimately finished the race just off the podium in fourth place, setting the pace prior to the successful solo move by his compatriot, Remco Evenepoel.

During the 2022 Tour de France, Netflix filmed a documentary titled Tour de France: Unchained following the riders and teams through the tour including Van Aert and Team Jumbo–Visma. Van Aert has commented that he disagrees with how he is portrayed in the series, stating that the series "focused on commotion".

==== 2023 – Silver at World and European championships ====
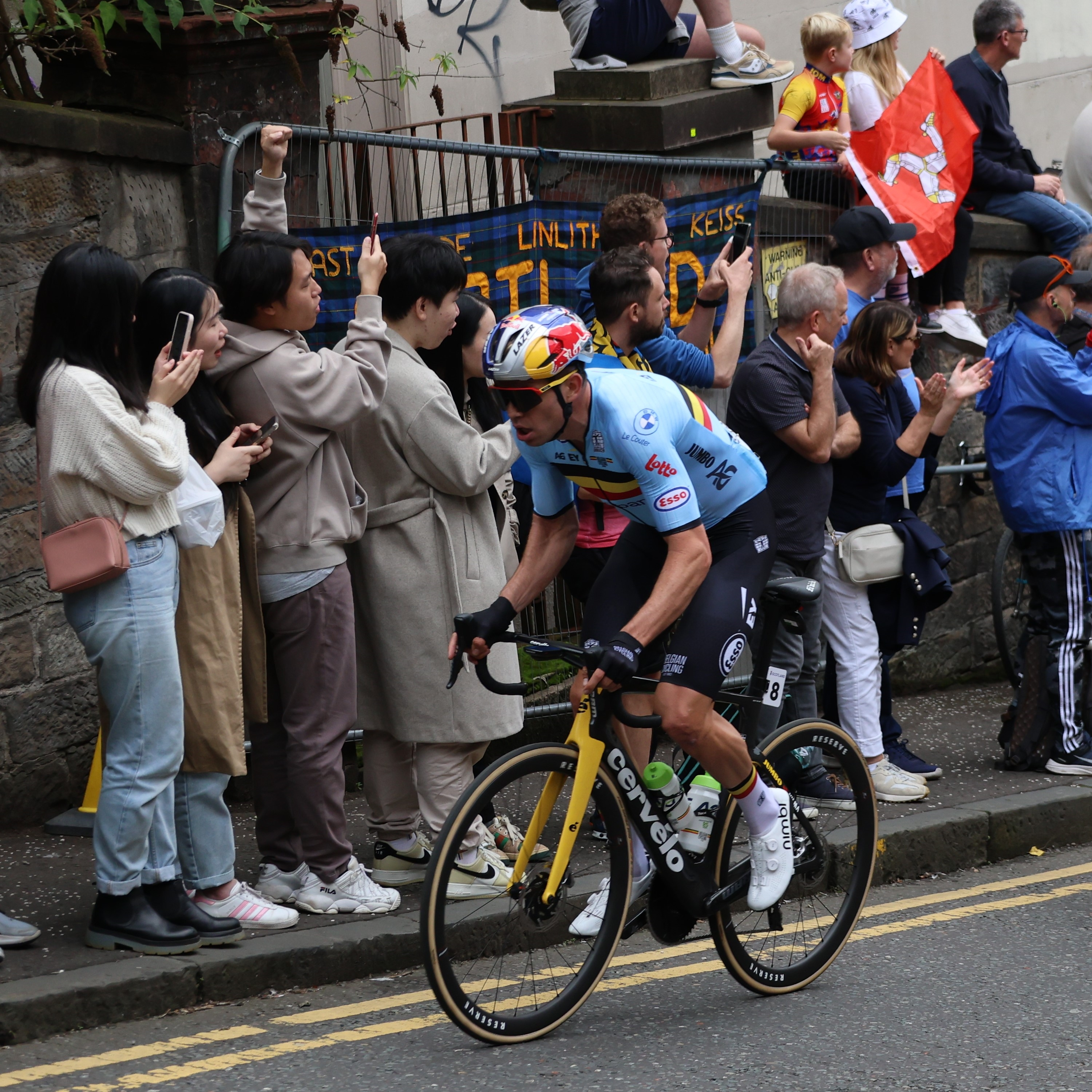
van Aert at the 2023 UCI Road World Championships – Men's road race

Van Aert won the silver medal at the UCI Cyclo-cross World Championships at Hoogerheide, after losing out in a battle with Mathieu van der Poel.

After commencing his 2023 road season at Tirreno–Adriatico, Van Aert took five consecutive podium finishes in one-day UCI World Tour races. At Milan–San Remo, Van der Poel attacked on the Poggio di San Remo, leaving his main rivals behind; Van Aert was also beaten to the line by Filippo Ganna, as he finished in third place. He then won in Harelbeke for the second year in succession with victory in the E3 Saxo Classic, beating Van der Poel and Tadej Pogačar, despite his rivals' best attempts to distance him. At Gent–Wevelgem, Van Aert and Christophe Laporte repeated their performance from the 2022 E3 Saxo Bank Classic by finishing 1–2 after a 50-kilometre (31-mile) move, with Laporte taking victory on this occasion. He then finished fourth at the Tour of Flanders, and third at Paris–Roubaix the following weekend, after a late puncture on the Carrefour de l'Arbre cobbled sector.

He claimed a silver medal at the 2023 UCI Road race World Championships in Glasgow, losing out to Mathieu van der Poel, but finishing ahead of the rest of the second group consisting of Tadej Pogačar and Mads Pedersen. A few days later he finished fifth in the time trial.

==== 2024 – Injury troubles ====
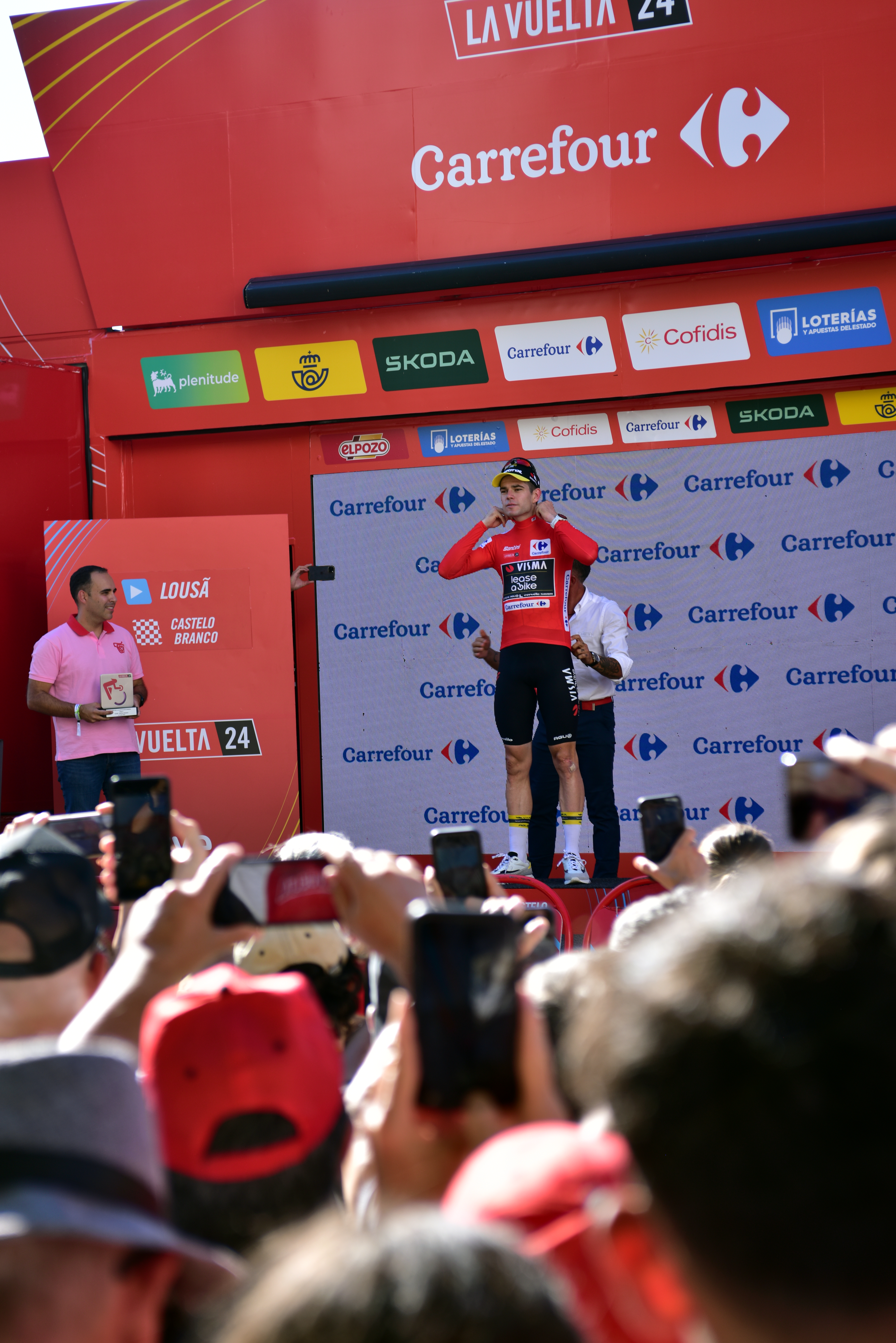
van Aert wearing the Red Jersey at the 2024 Vuelta a España

Van Aert suffered a high-speed crash around 70 km from the finish line of Dwars Door Vlaanderen, fracturing his collarbone and several ribs. This prevented him from finishing the race, and from starting several other classics. He failed to win any stages at the Tour de France, and he placed only 8th in the points classification.

He broke his drought of stage wins at his first Vuelta a España, winning stage three in the red jersey and taking the green jersey from Kaden Groves in doing so. He went on to win stage 7 after losing stage 5 to Pavel Bittner in a photo finish, throwing his bike before the finish line - a tactical error that cost him the stage. He attacked from the breakaway with Quentin Pacher before the final climb of stage ten, outsprinting Pacher at the finish to take his third stage win and sixth podium finish of the 2024 Vuelta. Van Aert also took the polka-dot jersey from Adam Yates after stage 13, taking maximum points in the King of the Mountains classification from the breakaway. However, KoM second place Marc Soler wore the jersey during stage 14 as van Aert remained in green. He abandoned the race during stage 16 after crashing on a wet descent less than 50 km from the finish. Visma-Lease a Bike, later confirmed that Van Aert hadn't suffered any fractures as a result of the crash and that he withdrew due to severe knee pain as a result of the crash. This left Visma–Lease a Bike with only five riders in the race, as van Aert's teammates Dylan van Baarle and Cian Uijtdebroeks had previously withdrawn.

On 18 September 2024, it was announced that van Aert had re-signed with Visma–Lease a Bike until the end of his career.

==== 2025 – Grand Tour Trilogy and Champ-Élysées Victory ====
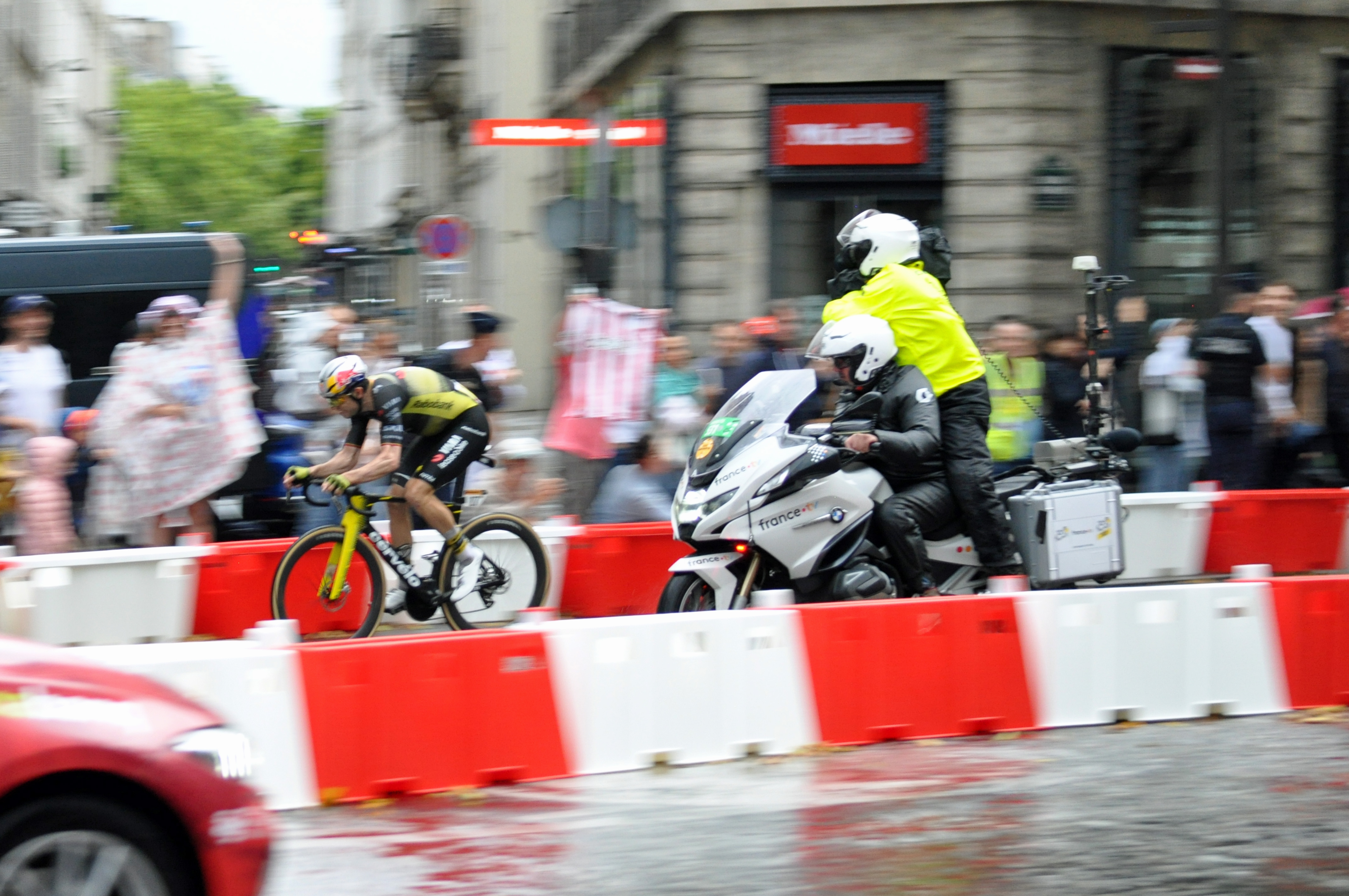
van Aert on his way to victory on Stage 21 of the 2025 Tour de France

Van Aert began 2025 with an abbreviated cyclo-cross campaign. He secured victories at the UCI Cyclo-cross World Cup in Dendermonde and the Superprestige in Gullegem. At the 2025 UCI Cyclo-cross World Championships in Liévin, he took the silver medal after a closely fought battle with long-time rival Mathieu van der Poel.

His begun his road season with a 39th at the Clásica Jaén Paraíso Interior and second in the final time trial at the Volta ao Algarve. In the Spring Classics, Van Aert faced criticism for a perceived lack of form after finishing outside the top 10 at both Omloop Het Nieuwsblad and Kuurne–Brussels–Kuurne. However, his form improved heading into the 'Holy Week'; he finished fourth at the Tour of Flanders, and followed this with a fourth-place finish at Paris–Roubaix and second at Brabantse Pijl.

In May, Van Aert made his debut at the 2025 Giro d'Italia. He achieved a major career milestone by winning stage nine into Siena, a hilly stage featuring the white gravel sectors of Tuscany. This victory completed his "trilogy" of stage wins in all three Grand Tours. For the remainder of the race, he acted as a domestique for teammate Simon Yates, notably providing a lead-out on the Colle delle Finestre during the penultimate stage to help Yates secure the overall victory.

Van Aert returned to the 2025 Tour de France in a support role for Jonas Vingegaard. Van Aert won the final stage on the Champs-Élysées in Paris, attacking solo on the final climb of Montmartre to win in the rain.

His late-season results included a third-place overall finish at the Deutschland Tour and a tenth-place at the Cyclassics Hamburg. However, his cyclocross campaign ended prematurely in early January when he suffered a fractured ankle during a crash in Mol, necessitating surgery and delaying the start of his 2026 preparations.

==== 2026 – Milan-San Remo, Tour of Flanders and glory at Paris-Roubaix ====
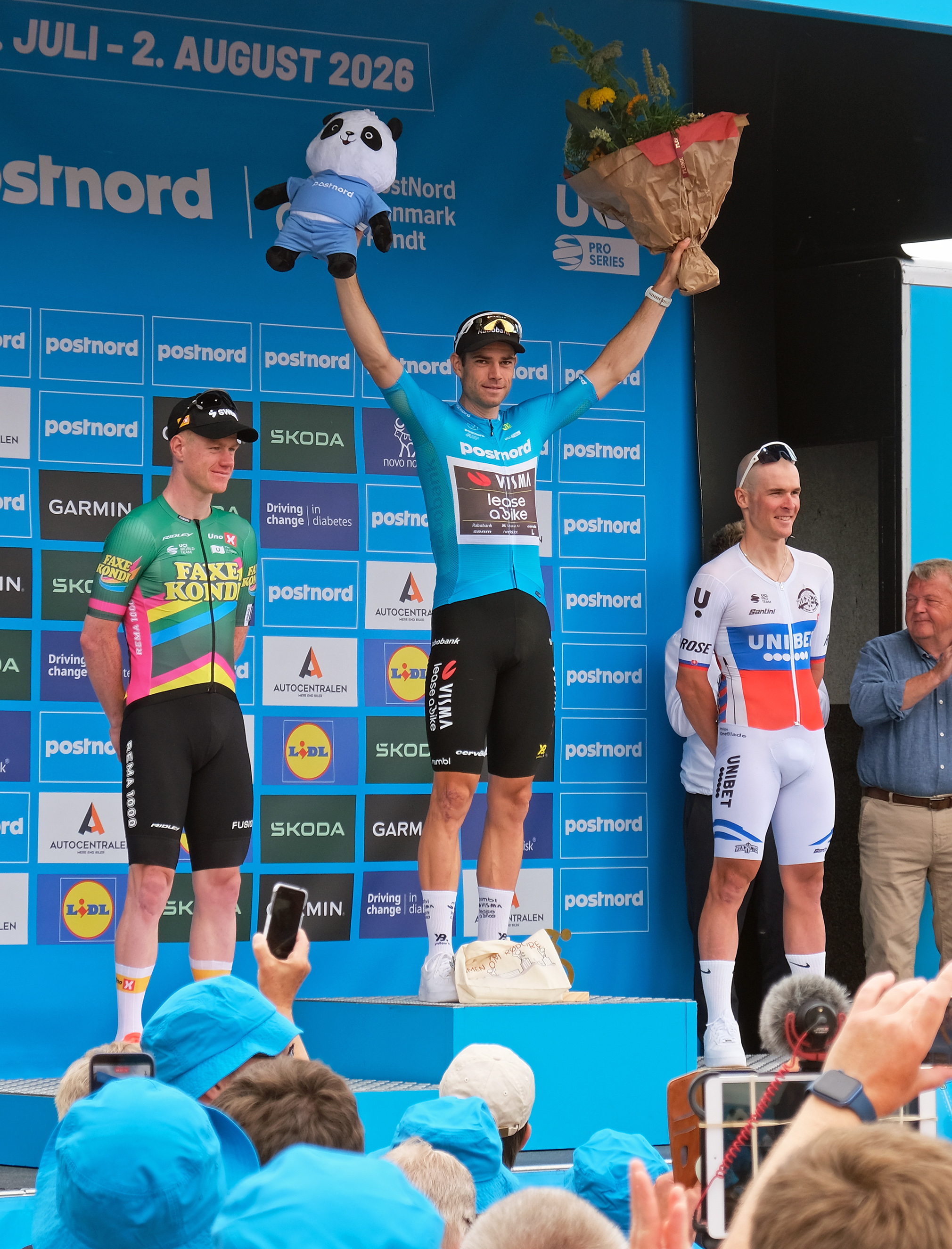
Van Aert returned to racing after an elbow injury by winning the 2026 Danmark Rundt

Van Aert finished within the top ten in the Strade Bianche and a 28th general classification finish in Tirreno–Adriatico. He finished third in Milan–San Remo behind Tadej Pogačar and Tom Pidcock. He finished 30th in Gent–Wevelgem, but did not race E3 Saxo Classic. In April, Van Aert came second to Filippo Ganna in Dwars door Vlaanderen, being beaten to the line with only 150 metres to the finish. In the Tour of Flanders, Van Aert finished in fourth place behind Pogačar, Mathieu van der Poel and Remco Evenepoel.

Van Aert started Paris–Roubaix. He attacked the breakaway group which included Pogačar, Mads Pedersen and teammate Christophe Laporte with 54.2 km to go. Only Pogačar and Pedersen managed to keep up with him, with Pedersen being dropped shortly after and caught by the chasing group. Van Aert and Pogačar kept a consistent gap between them and the chasing group which included defending champion Mathieu van der Poel. Pogačar led the duo into the Roubaix Velodrome, and with 200 meters from the finish, Van Aert launched his sprint and won the race. He pointed to the sky in memory of his former-teammate Michael Goolaerts, who had a cardiac arrest during the 2018 edition and later died in hospital. Van Aert secured his second monument, alongside his 2020 Milan–San Remo win.

Van Aert suffered an elbow injury while training for the 2026 Tour Auvergne-Rhône-Alpes, which later became infected. The injury led to Visma announcing his withdrawal from the 2026 Tour de France.

Van Aert returned to racing at the Danmark Rundt. He won the first three stages, and won the general classification.

Van Aert was selected for the Vuelta a España. He finished eighth on the opening stage, a time trial in Monaco. He won stage thirteen from the breakaway, beating Valentin Paret-Peintre in a sprint. On stage fifteen, which was shortened due to severe heat and the extreme weather protocol being enacted, van Aert beat four other riders to take the stage into Córdoba. Van Aert also won the points classification and the super-combativity award.

== Personal life ==
Van Aert married Sarah de Bie in 2018, and the couple have two sons, born in 2021 and 2023. Van Aert withdrew from the 2023 Tour de France before stage 18 to return home for the birth of their second child. Their second child was born shortly after Van Aert left the race.
