= 2014 UCI Cyclo-cross World Championships =

Cyclo-cross championship

- Venue: Hoogerheide, Netherlands
- Date: 1–2 February 2014
- Coordinates: 51°25′3″N 4°19′26″E
- Events: 4

The 2014 UCI Cyclo-cross World Championships is the World Championship for cyclo-cross for the season 2013–14. It took place in Hoogerheide, Netherlands on Saturday 1 and Sunday 2 February 2014. Hoogerheide is also the place where the Grand Prix Adri van der Poel is held, up to the 2012–13 season a race in the UCI Cyclo-cross World Cup.

== Riders ==
This world championship saw 229 cyclists taking part, as much as the record that was set in Tábor four years before. Macedonia and Serbia participated for the first time ever, both sending a rider to the Junior Men category. That category saw 59 participants, the Women's Elite had 45 starters. On Sunday 59 Men competed for the Under 23 title and the Elite Men jersey was contended between 66 riders.

== Track ==
The track is, bar some minor changes, identical to the one used for the 2012–13 World Cup. It is 3.443 km (2.139 mi) long consisting for 13% out of road, 14% out of forest and the remaining 73% is meadow. The Junior Men completed five laps, the Elite Women four, the Under-23 six and the Elite Men eight laps.

== Schedule ==
- Saturday 1 February 2014
  - 11:00 Men's Junior
  - 15:00 Women's Elite
- Sunday 2 February 2014
  - 11:00 Men's Under 23
  - 15:00 Men's Elite

All times in local time (UTC+1).

== Medal summary ==
=== Medalists ===
| Event | Gold | | Silver | | Bronze | |
|---|---|---|---|---|---|---|
Men's events
| Men's elite race | Zdeněk Štybar; Czech Republic | 1h 05' 29" | Sven Nys; Belgium | + 12" | Kevin Pauwels; Belgium | + 40" |
| Men's under-23 race | Wout Van Aert; Belgium | 49' 35" | Michael Vanthourenhout; Belgium | + 50" | Mathieu van der Poel; Netherlands | + 1' 17" |
| Men's junior race | Thijs Aerts; Belgium | 45' 55" | Yannick Peeters; Belgium | + 10" | Jelle Schuermans; Belgium | + 12" |
Women's events
| Women's elite race | Marianne Vos; Netherlands | 39' 25" | Eva Lechner; Italy | + 1' 07" | Helen Wyman; Great Britain | + 1' 17" |

=== Medal table ===
* Host nation (Netherlands)

| Rank | Nation | Gold | Silver | Bronze | Total |
|---|---|---|---|---|---|
| 1 | Belgium (BEL) | 2 | 3 | 2 | 7 |
| 2 | Netherlands (NED) | 1 | 0 | 1 | 2 |
| 3 | Czech Republic (CZE) | 1 | 0 | 0 | 1 |
| 4 | Italy (ITA) | 0 | 1 | 0 | 1 |
| 5 | Great Britain (GBR) | 0 | 0 | 1 | 1 |
| Totals (5 entries) | | 4 | 4 | 4 | 12 |
