= Grand Prix de la Région Wallonne =

The Grand Prix de la Région Wallonne (French for Grand Prix of the Walloon region) was a cyclo-cross race held annually since its creation in 1998.

For many years it was held at Dottignies, Belgium. Its November 2014 edition was the first to be held at the Circuit de Spa-Francorchamps, better known for motor racing. This edition also saw it become part of the Superprestige competition series, marking the first time that the Superprestige has been held in Wallonia. The race was organized the last time in November 2016 and was then discontinued. Its licence was later used to organize the Brussels Universities Cyclocross.

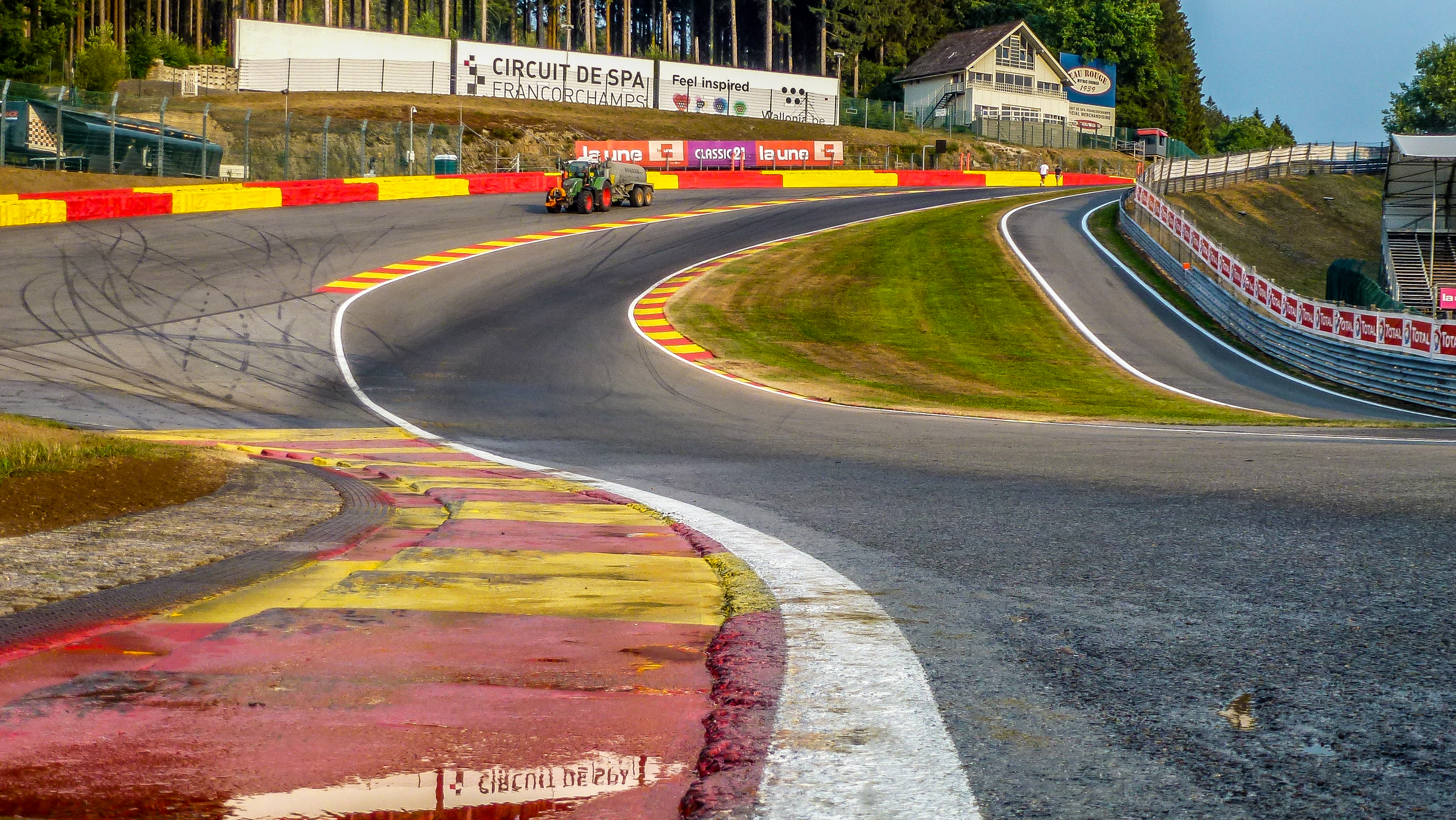
This 2018 view of the iconic corner combination at the Circuit de Spa-Francorchamps shows the former track layout before its 2022 safety redesign. From 2014 to 2016, this section of the racecourse served as the paved segment of the Grand Prix de la Région Wallonne cyclo-cross event, requiring navigation of the Eau Rouge left-hander before transitioning into the steep, blind 17% uphill climb of Raidillon flanked by wide asphalt runoff zones.
