= List of career achievements by Marianne Vos =

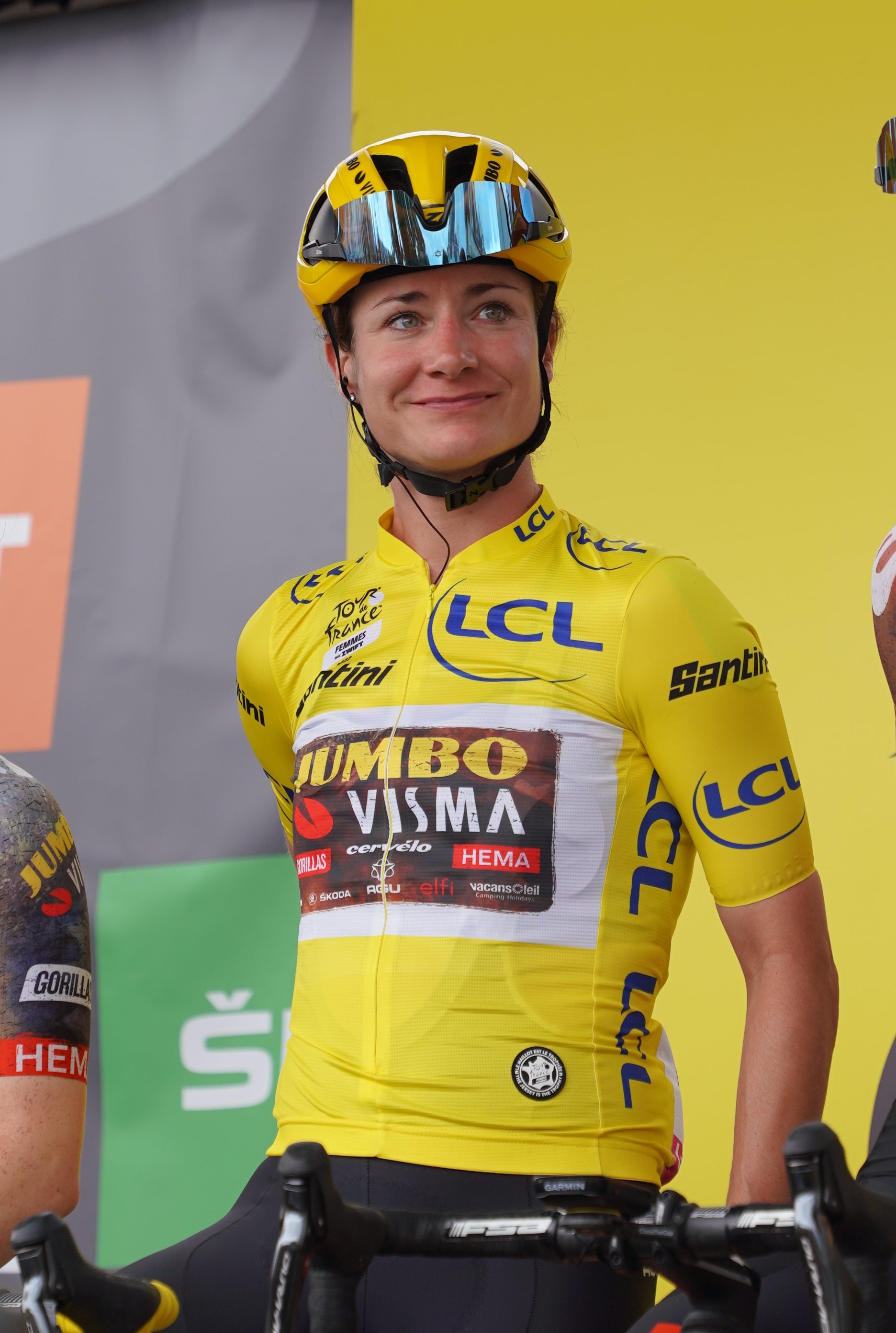
Vos wearing the 2022 Tour de France Femmes yellow jersey

This is a list of career achievements by Marianne Vos, a Dutch professional racing cyclist for UCI Women's World Tour Team Visma–Lease a Bike. Vos has competed on the track, on the road, in cyclo-cross and in mountain bike events since 2001.

Due to the dominant nature of her performances, Vos has drawn comparison to Eddy Merckx as being "the finest cyclist of [her] generation". After winning a junior European and World Championship in road racing, she continued her success in senior cycling by becoming World Champion in cyclo-cross and road racing at the age of 19. Vos added track racing World Championships when she won the points race in 2008 and the scratch race in 2011. At the 2008 Summer Olympics, she won the gold medal in the points race; at the 2012 Summer Olympics, gold in the women's road race. She is a 3 times World Road Race Champion – in 2006, 2012 and 2013 – and 8 times World Cyclo-cross Champion – in 2006, 2009, 2010, 2011, 2012, 2013, 2014 and 2022.

== Overview ==
| Race | Gold medal | Silver medal | Bronze medal |
|---|---|---|---|
| Dutch road championships | 4 | 5 | 3 |
| Dutch time trial championship | 2 | 0 | 1 |
| Dutch cyclo-cross championships | 7 | 6 | 1 |
| Dutch track championships | 3 | 1 | 0 |
| Dutch gravel championships | 1 | 0 | 0 |
| European road championships | 1 | 1 | 0 |
| European cyclo-cross championships | 2 | 2 | 1 |
| World road championships | 3 | 6 | 0 |
| World cyclo-cross championships | 8 | 2 | 2 |
| World track championships | 2 | 0 | 0 |
| World gravel championships | 1 | 1 | 0 |
| Olympic road race | 1 | 1 | 0 |
| Olympic track events | 1 | 0 | 0 |
| Giro Rosa | 3 | 0 | 0 |
| Grande Boucle Féminine | 0 | 0 | 1 |
| Road races | 311 | (...) | (...) |
| Cyclo-cross races | 118 | (...) | (...) |
| Mountain bike races | 13 | (...) | (...) |
| Track races | 12 | (...) | (...) |
| Gravel races | 3 | 0 | 0 |

* Current on 26 November 2022

== Cyclo-cross ==
2002–2003
3rd National Championships
2003–2004
1st Pijnacker
2nd UEC European Championships
3rd Koksijde
3rd Torino
2004–2005
2nd National Championships
3rd Milan
2005–2006
1st UCI World Championships
1st UEC European Championships
2nd Overall UCI World Cup

2nd Kalmthout
2nd Pijnacker
2nd Milan
2nd Liévin
4th Hoogerheide

2nd National Championships
2006–2007
2nd Overall UCI World Cup

1st Treviso
2nd Kalmthout
2nd Hoogerheide
4th Nommay
5th Hofstade

2nd National Championships
3rd UEC European Championships
2007–2008
2nd UCI World Championships
2008–2009
1st UCI World Championships
UCI World Cup

1st Heusden-Zolder
4th Roubaix

2nd Overall Gazet van Antwerpen

1st Sluitingsprijs
2nd Lille
3rd Loenhout

2nd Frankfurt
2nd Antwerpen
2nd Pétange
2009–2010
1st UCI World Championships
1st UEC European Championships
2nd Overall UCI World Cup

1st Koksijde
1st Heusden-Zolder
1st Hoogerheide
2nd Nommay
2nd Kalmthout
3rd Roubaix

6th Overall Gazet van Antwerpen

1st Lille
1st Oostmalle
2nd Loenhout

1st Frankfurt
1st Pétange
1st Sint-Michielsgestel
1st Surhuisterveen
2nd National Championships
Superprestige

2nd Gavere

2010–2011
1st UCI World Championships
1st National Championships
3rd Overall UCI World Cup

1st Pontchâteau
2nd Kalmthout
2nd Heusden-Zolder
3rd Hoogerheide

Gazet van Antwerpen

1st Loenhout

1st Pétange
1st Cauberg
2nd Antwerpen
3rd Tervuren
2011–2012
1st UCI World Championships
1st National Championships
2nd Overall UCI World Cup

1st Namur
1st Heusden-Zolder
1st Liévin
1st Hoogerheide
2nd Koksijde

Superprestige

1st Gieten
1st Diegem

Gazet van Antwerpen

1st Essen
1st Loenhout
1st Lille
2nd Oostmalle

2012–2013
1st UCI World Championships
1st National Championships
UCI World Cup

1st Heusden-Zolder
1st Rome
1st Hoogerheide
3rd Namur

BPost Bank Trophy

1st Lille

1st Pétange
1st Surhuisterveen
1st Otegem
1st Rucphen
Superprestige

2nd Gieten

2013–2014
1st UCI World Championships
1st National Championships
3rd Overall UCI World Cup

1st Cauberg
1st Nommay
2nd Namur
2nd Heusden-Zolder
2nd Rome

BPost Bank Trophy

1st Loenhout
2nd Baal

1st Brabant
1st Woerden
1st Surhuisterveen
1st Rucphen
1st Leuven
2nd Lille
2014–2015
1st National Championships
UCI World Cup

1st Heusden-Zolder
2nd Namur

Superprestige

1st Diegem

BPost Bank Trophy

2nd Loenhout

1st Surhuisterveen
3rd UCI World Championships
2016–2017
1st National Championships
UCI World Cup

1st Heusden-Zolder
1st Rome
1st Hoogerheide

Superprestige

1st Diegem

DVV Trophy

1st Baal
2nd Loenhout

Brico Cross

1st Maldegem

1st Surhuisterveen
2nd UCI World Championships
2017–2018
Brico Cross

1st Maldegem

UCI World Cup

4th Hoogerheide
5th Heusden-Zolder

2018–2019
1st Overall UCI World Cup

1st Waterloo
1st Bern
1st Heusden-Zolder
1st Pontchâteau
2nd Namur
3rd Hoogerheide

Superprestige

1st Ruddervoorde
2nd Gieten

Brico Cross

1st Ronse

1st Woerden
2nd UEC European Championships
2nd National Championships
3rd UCI World Championships
2019–2020
Ethias Cross

1st Essen

1st Xativa
UCI World Cup

4th Heusden-Zolder

2020–2021
Ethias Cross

1st Essen

3rd Mol
2021–2022
1st UCI World Championships
1st National Championships
UCI World Cup

1st Waterloo
1st Iowa City
1st Rucphen
1st Hoogerheide
2nd Val di Sole
4th Fayetteville
4th Dendermonde

2022–2023
X²O Badkamers Trophy

1st Kortrijk

2nd Woerden
UCI World Cup

5th Beekse Bergen

2024–2025
UCI World Cup

4th Benidorm
5th Besançon

== Gravel ==
2022
1st National Championships
2023
UCI World Series

1st Halmstad

2024
1st UCI World Championships
2025
UCI World Series

1st Aachen

2nd UCI World Championships
2026
1st UCI World Championships
UCI World Series

3rd Girona

== Mountain bike ==
2002
1st Cross-country, National Junior Championships
2003
1st Cross-country, National Junior Championships
2004
1st Cross-country, National Junior Championships
2005
1st Cross-country, National Junior Championships
UCI Junior World Cup

1st Houffalize

1st MTB Cup Heeswijk
2013
1st Overall Afxentia Stage Race

1st Stages 2 & 3

MTB Topcompetitie

1st Nieuwkuijk
1st Norg
1st Steenwijk

1st Egmond-pier-Egmond
1st Sea Otter Classic
1st MTB Cup Heeswijk
2014
1st Egmond-pier-Egmond
1st Sea Otter Classic
2015
MTB Topcompetitie

1st Nieuwkuijk

== Road ==
2002
1st Road race, National Cadet Championships
2004
UCI World Junior Championships

1st Road race
5th Time trial

3rd Time trial, National Junior Championships
2005
National Junior Championships

1st Road race
5th Time trial

1st Omloop van Borsele
2nd Road race, UCI World Junior Championships
5th Ronde van Gelderland
2006 (9 pro wins)
1st Road race, UCI World Championships
1st Road race, UEC European Under-23 Championships
1st Road race, National Championships
1st Overall Tour Féminin en Limousin

1st Points classification
1st Young rider classification
1st Stages 1 (ITT) & 3

1st Omloop van Borsele
1st Omloop van Valkenburg
1st Criterium Steenwijk
1st Draai van de Kaai
1st Criterium Oostvoorne
1st Criterium Pijnacker
2nd Overall Giro della Toscana

1st Points classification
1st Young rider classification
1st Stage 1 (TTT)

2nd Holland Hills Classic
4th Overall Ster Zeeuwsche Eilanden
4th Overall Trophée d'Or Féminin

1st Stage 4

5th Overall Emakumeen Bira

1st Points classification
1st Young rider classification
1st Stage 1

6th Overall Gracia–Orlová

1st Stage 5

6th Ronde van Gelderland
7th Tour de Berne
2007 (21)
1st Overall UCI World Cup
1st Road race, UEC European Under-23 Championships
1st Overall Giro di San Marino

1st Stages 1 (ITT), 2, 3 & 4

1st Overall Ster Zeeuwsche Eilanden

1st Stages 1 (ITT) & 2

1st La Flèche Wallonne
1st Rund um die Nürnberger Altstadt
1st Ronde van Gelderland
1st Omloop van Borsele
1st Holland Hills Classic
1st Stage 2 Giro Rosa
2nd Road race, UCI World Championships
2nd Road race, National Championships
2nd Overall Emakumeen Bira

1st Points classification
1st Stages 2 & 3

2nd Novilon Internationale Damesronde van Drenthe
2nd Tour de Berne
3rd Tour of Flanders
3rd Ronde van Drenthe
4th Coupe du Monde Cycliste Féminine de Montréal
6th Overall Tour de l'Aude

1st Stages 1, 3, 4 & 7

7th Overall Holland Ladies Tour

1st Points classification
1st Young rider classification
1st Stages 1 & 4

7th GP de Plouay
10th Open de Suède Vårgårda
2008 (23)
1st Road race, National Championships
1st Overall Gracia–Orlová

1st Points classification
1st Mountains classification
1st Stages 1, 2 & 3 (ITT)

1st Overall Vuelta a Occidente

1st Points classification
1st Young rider classification
1st Prologue, Stages 1 & 2 (ITT)

1st Overall Emakumeen Bira

1st Points classification
1st Stages 1, 2, 3 (ITT) & 4

1st Grand Prix de Dottignies
1st La Flèche Wallonne
1st GP de Santa Ana
2nd Road race, UCI World Championships
2nd Overall Vuelta a El Salvador

1st Young rider classification
1st Stages 1, 2 & 3 (ITT)

2nd Ronde van Drenthe
3rd Overall Giro della Toscana

1st Stage 2

3rd Omloop van Borsele
4th Iurreta-Emakumeen Bira
4th Overall Krasna Lipa Tour

1st Stages 2 & 3 (ITT)

4th Overall Holland Ladies Tour

1st Young rider classification

4th Rund um die Nürnberger Altstadt
5th Tour of Flanders
6th Road race, Summer Olympics
9th Overall Giro del Trentino Alto Adige-Südtirol
2009 (18)
1st Overall UCI World Cup
National Championships

1st Road race
4th Time trial

1st Overall Holland Ladies Tour

1st Young rider classification

1st Trofeo Alfredo Binda
1st Novilon Eurocup Ronde van Drenthe
1st La Flèche Wallonne
1st 7-Dorpenomloop Aalburg
1st Holland Hills Classic
1st Open de Suède Vårgårda
2nd Road race, UCI World Championships
2nd Overall Tour de Bretagne

1st Stages 3, 4 (ITT) & 5

2nd Overall Thüringen Rundfahrt

1st Points classification
1st Young rider classification
1st Stage 1

2nd Omloop van Borsele
2nd Tour de Berne
2nd GP de Plouay
UEC European Under-23 Championships

3rd Road race
3rd Time trial

3rd Gran Premio della Costa Etruschi
3rd Overall Grande Boucle

1st Stage 4

3rd Overall Tour de l'Aude

1st Stages 4, 7 & 8

3rd Overall Gracia–Orlová

1st Stage 1

4th Overall Giro della Toscana

1st Stages 4 (ITT) & 6

4th Ronde van Gelderland
5th Open de Suède Vårgårda TTT
6th Tour of Flanders
6th Rund um die Nürnberger Altstadt
8th Ronde van Drenthe
8th Trofeo Costa Etrusca
2010 (18)
1st Overall UCI World Cup
National Championships

1st Time trial
2nd Road race

1st Overall Gracia–Orlová

1st Stages 1, 4 & 5

1st Overall Holland Ladies Tour

1st Points classification
1st Stages 3 & 7

1st Trofeo Alfredo Binda
1st 7-Dorpenomloop Aalburg
1st Emakumeen Saria
2nd Road race, UCI World Championships
2nd Tour of Flanders
2nd GP de Plouay
3rd Open de Suède Vårgårda TTT
4th Overall Emakumeen Bira

1st Points classification
1st Stages 1 & 3b

4th Novilon Eurocup Ronde van Drenthe
4th Omloop van Borsele
4th GP Ciudad de Valladolid
6th Overall Ster Zeeuwsche Eilanden
6th Overall Giro della Toscana

1st Stage 5

6th La Flèche Wallonne
7th Overall Giro d'Italia Femminile

1st Points classification
1st Young rider classification
1st Stages 5 & 6

7th Overall La Route de France

1st Stages 2 & 5

8th Overall Tour de l'Aude

1st Points classification
1st Young rider classification
1st Stage 8

2011 (31)
National Championships

1st Road race
1st Time trial

1st Overall Giro d'Italia Femminile

1st Points classification
1st Mountains classification
1st Stages 1, 3, 6, 7 & 9

1st Overall Emakumeen Bira

1st Points classification
1st Stages 1, 2 & 4

1st Overall Ster Zeeuwsche Eilanden

1st Stages 1 (ITT) & 3

1st Overall Holland Ladies Tour

1st Points classification
1st Stages 1, 5, & 6

1st Ronde van Drenthe
1st Drentse 8
1st 7-Dorpenomloop Aalburg
1st Gooik–Geraardsbergen–Gooik
1st La Flèche Wallonne
1st Grand Prix Elsy Jacobs
1st Grand Prix Nicolas Frantz
1st GP Ciudad de Valladolid
1st Durango-Durango Emakumeen Saria
2nd Road race
3rd Overall Energiewacht Tour

1st Stages 1 & 4

3rd Tour of Flanders
3rd Omloop van Borsele
3rd GP de Plouay
5th Open de Suède Vårgårda TTT
8th Overall Trophée d'Or Féminin

1st Stage 4

10th UCI Road World Championships – Women's time trial
2012 (20)
1st Road race, Summer Olympics
1st Road race, UCI World Championships
1st Overall UCI World Cup
1st Overall Giro Rosa

1st Points classification
1st Stages 1, 2 (ITT), 4, 7 & 8

1st Overall Tour Féminin en Limousin

1st Points classification
1st Stages 1 & 4

1st Overall Grand Prix Elsy Jacobs

1st Points classification
1st Stage 1

1st Overall Holland Ladies Tour

1st Sprints classification
1st Stages 4 & 6

1st Ronde van Drenthe
1st Novilon Euregio Cup
1st Trofeo Alfredo Binda
1st GP de Plouay
1st Amstel Curaçao Race
2nd Road race, National Championships
2nd La Flèche Wallonne
2nd GP Comune di Cornaredo
2nd Holland Hills Classic
3rd Ronde van Drenthe
3rd Overall Energiewacht Tour
Open de Suède Vårgårda

3rd Team time trial
3rd Road race

5th GP Stad Roeselare
2013 (22)
UCI World Championships

1st Road race
2nd Team time trial

1st Overall UCI World Cup
1st Overall Grand Prix Elsy Jacobs

1st Points classification
1st Stage 2

1st Overall Trophée d'Or Féminin

1st Stages 1, 2 & 4

1st Tour of Flanders
1st La Flèche Wallonne
1st Drentse 8 van Dwingeloo
1st Ronde van Drenthe
1st Durango-Durango Emakumeen Saria
1st Open de Suède Vårgårda

1st Road race
2nd Team time trial

1st GP de Plouay
1st Profronde van Tiel
1st Ridderronde Maastricht
Giro della Toscana

1st Prologue, Stages 2 & 3

2nd Road race, National Championships
5th Overall Emakumeen Euskal Bira

1st Points classification
1st Stage 1

5th Gooik–Geraardsbergen–Gooik
6th Overall Giro d'Italia Femminile

1st Points classification
1st Stages 3, 4 & 7

6th Trofeo Alfredo Binda
2014 (21)
1st Overall Giro d'Italia Femminile

1st Points classification
1st Stages 1, 4, 5 & 7

1st Overall The Women's Tour

1st Points classification
1st Stages 3, 4 & 5

1st La Course by Le Tour de France
1st 7-Dorpenomloop Aalburg
1st Gooik–Geraardsbergen–Gooik
1st Durango-Durango Emakumeen Saria
1st Sparkassen Giro
1st Stage 3 Holland Ladies Tour
1st Stage 2 (TTT) Belgium Tour
2nd Overall Festival Luxembourgeois du Elsy Jacobs

1st Points classification
1st Prologue & Stage 2

2nd Overall Emakumeen Euskal Bira

1st Points classification
1st Stages 2 & 4

2nd Overall Tour of Norway

1st Prologue & Stage 2

Open de Suède Vårgårda

2nd Team time trial
4th Road race

2nd GP de Plouay
National Championships

3rd Road race
3rd Time trial

6th La Flèche Wallonne
10th Road race, UCI World Championships
2015
2nd Marianne Vos Classic
6th Ronde van Gelderland
2016 (9)
1st Pajot Hills Classic
1st 7-Dorpenomloop Aalburg
1st Keukens Van Lommel Classic
2nd Overall Belgium Tour

1st Points classification
1st Sprints classification
1st Stage 2

2nd Gran Premio Bruno Beghelli
3rd Road race, National Championships
3rd La Course by Le Tour de France
3rd Crescent Vårgårda TTT
4th Overall Tour of California

1st Stage 3

4th Overall The Women's Tour

1st Points classification
1st Stage 4

4th Ronde van Gelderland
4th Holland Hills Classic
5th Overall Thüringen Rundfahrt

1st Stages 1, 3 & 5

7th Road race, UEC European Championships
9th Road race, Summer Olympics
9th La Flèche Wallonne
9th Dwars door de Westhoek
10th Overall Festival Luxembourgeois du Elsy Jacobs
10th Acht van Westerveld
2017 (9)
1st Road race, UEC European Championships
1st Overall BeNe Ladies Tour

1st Points classification
1st Sprints classification
1st Stages 2b (ITT) & 3

1st Overall Tour of Norway

1st Points classification

1st Trofee Maarten Wynants
1st Gooik–Geraardsbergen–Gooik
1st 7-Dorpenomloop Aalburg
2nd Crescent Vårgårda Road Race
3rd Overall Belgium Tour

1st Points classification
1st Stage 1

3rd Omloop van Borsele
4th RideLondon Classique
7th Ronde van Drenthe
2018 (8)
1st Overall Tour of Norway

1st Points classification
1st Stages 1, 2 & 3

1st Overall BeNe Ladies Tour

1st Sprints classification
1st Points classification
1st Stage 1

1st Postnord Vårgårda WestSweden Road race
1st Stage 8 Giro Rosa
2nd Road race, UEC European Championships
2nd Overall The Women's Tour

1st Points classification

2nd RideLondon Classique
2nd GP de Plouay
3rd Road race, National Championships
3rd Trofeo Alfredo Binda
3rd Brabantse Pijl
5th Ronde van Drenthe
10th Amstel Gold Race
2019 (19)
1st Overall UCI World Tour
1st Overall Tour de Yorkshire

1st Stage 2

1st Overall Tour of Norway

1st Stages 2, 3 & 4

1st Overall Tour Cycliste Féminin International de l'Ardèche

1st Points classification
1st Stages 1, 2, 3, 6 & 7

1st Trofeo Alfredo Binda
1st La Course by Le Tour de France
Giro Rosa

1st Stages 2, 3, 7 & 10

1st Stage 2 The Women's Tour
2nd Road race, European Games
2nd Road race, National Championships
2nd Postnord Vårgårda West Sweden
3rd Amstel Gold Race
3rd Tour of Guangxi
4th La Flèche Wallonne
6th Road race, UCI World Championships
6th RideLondon Classique
7th Strade Bianche
10th Three Days of Bruges–De Panne
2020 (3)
Giro Rosa

1st Points classification
1st Stages 3, 5 & 6

2nd La Course by Le Tour de France
4th Road race, UCI World Championships
4th Road race, National Championships
4th Liège–Bastogne–Liège
6th Strade Bianche
8th Road race, UEC European Championships
9th La Flèche Wallonne
2021 (7)
1st Gent–Wevelgem
1st Amstel Gold Race
Giro Rosa

1st Stages 3 & 7

2nd Road race, UCI World Championships
2nd Paris–Roubaix
2nd Trofeo Alfredo Binda
3rd La Course by Le Tour de France
4th Overall Holland Ladies Tour

1st Points classification
1st Prologue, Stages 4 & 5

5th Road race, Summer Olympics
6th Liège–Bastogne–Liège
7th Strade Bianche
2022 (8)
Tour de France

1st Points classification
1st Stages 2 & 6
Held after Stages 2–6
Combativity award Overall

Tour of Scandinavia

1st Stages 1, 2, 3 & 6

Giro Donne

1st Stage 2 & 5

2nd Gent–Wevelgem
4th Road race, National Championships
5th Veenendaal–Veenendaal Classic
7th Strade Bianche
2023 (2)
La Vuelta Femenina

1st Points classification
1st Stages 1 (TTT), 3 & 4
Held after Stages 2–4

3rd Road race, National Championships
3rd Dwars door Vlaanderen
10th Paris–Roubaix
2024 (7)
1st Overall Volta a Catalunya

1st Stage 2

1st Amstel Gold Race
1st Omloop Het Nieuwsblad
1st Dwars door Vlaanderen
1st Points classification, Tour de France
La Vuelta Femenina

1st Stages 3 & 7

2nd Road race, Olympic Games
4th Paris–Roubaix
6th Overall Setmana Ciclista Valenciana
7th Liège–Bastogne–Liège
9th Strade Bianche
2025 (3)
La Vuelta Femenina

1st Points classification
1st Stages 2 & 6

Tour de France

1st Stage 1
Held after Stages 1 & 3–4
Held after Stages 1–2

2nd Milan–San Remo
2nd Brabantse Pijl
2nd Classic Lorient Agglomération
4th Trofeo Alfredo Binda
4th Paris–Roubaix
2026 (1)
1st Stage 3 Volta a Catalunya
2nd Paris–Roubaix
6th Trofeo Alfredo Binda-Comune di Cittiglio
7th Strade Bianche

=== General classification results ===
| Major Tours | 2006 | 2007 | 2008 | 2009 | 2010 | 2011 | 2012 | 2013 | 2014 | 2015 | 2016 | 2017 | 2018 | 2019 | 2020 | 2021 | 2022 | 2023 | 2024 | 2025 |
|---|---|---|---|---|---|---|---|---|---|---|---|---|---|---|---|---|---|---|---|---|
| La Vuelta Femenina | Race did not exist | | | | | | | | | | | | | | | | | 26 | 24 | 40 |
| Giro Rosa | — | 12 | — | — | 7 | 1 | 1 | 6 | 1 | — | — | — | DNF | 20 | 11 | DNF | DNF | 48 | — | DNF |
| Tour de France Femmes | Race did not exist | | | | | | | | | | | | | | | | 26 | DNF | 31 | 37 |
| Stage race | 2006 | 2007 | 2008 | 2009 | 2010 | 2011 | 2012 | 2013 | 2014 | 2015 | 2016 | 2017 | 2018 | 2019 | 2020 | 2021 | 2022 | 2023 | 2024 | 2025 |
| Tour de l'Aude Cycliste Féminin | — | 6 | — | 3 | 8 | Race not held | | | | | | | | | | | | | | |
| / Emakumeen Euskal Bira | 5 | 2 | 1 | — | 4 | 1 | — | 5 | 2 | — | — | — | — | — | Not held | | | | | |
| / / The Women's Tour | Race did not exist | | | | | | | | 1 | — | 4 | DNF | 2 | DNF | NH | — | — | — | — | — |
| Tour of California | Race did not exist | | | | | | | | | — | 4 | — | — | — | Not held | | | | | |
| Thüringen Rundfahrt | — | — | DNF | 2 | — | — | — | — | — | — | 5 | — | — | — | NH | — | — | — | — | NH |
| / Tour of Norway | Race did not exist | | | | | | | | 2 | — | — | 1 | 1 | 1 | NH | — | 14 | — | Not Held | |
| / Holland Ladies Tour | 28 | 7 | 4 | 1 | 1 | 1 | 1 | — | DNF | — | — | — | — | — | NH | 4 | — | — | — | — |
| Grande Boucle Féminine Internationale | — | — | — | 3 | Race not held | | | | | | | | | | | | | | | |

=== Classics results timeline ===
| Monuments | 2006 | 2007 | 2008 | 2009 | 2010 | 2011 | 2012 | 2013 | 2014 | 2015 | 2016 | 2017 | 2018 | 2019 | 2020 | 2021 | 2022 | 2023 | 2024 | 2025 | 2026 |
|---|---|---|---|---|---|---|---|---|---|---|---|---|---|---|---|---|---|---|---|---|---|
| Milan–San Remo | Not held | | | | | | | | | | | | | | | | | | | 2 | — |
| Tour of Flanders | — | 3 | 5 | 6 | 2 | 3 | — | 1 | — | — | — | — | 35 | 22 | — | 12 | 20 | 15 | 4 | 40 | — |
| Paris–Roubaix | Race did not exist | | | | | | | | | | | | | | NH | 2 | — | 10 | 4 | 4 | 2 |
| Liège–Bastogne–Liège | Race did not exist | | | | | | | | | | | — | 56 | 21 | 4 | 6 | — | — | 7 | — | |
| Classic | 2006 | 2007 | 2008 | 2009 | 2010 | 2011 | 2012 | 2013 | 2014 | 2015 | 2016 | 2017 | 2018 | 2019 | 2020 | 2021 | 2022 | 2023 | 2024 | 2025 | 2026 |
| Omloop Het Nieuwsblad | — | — | — | — | — | — | — | — | — | — | — | — | — | — | — | — | — | — | 1 | — | — |
| Trofeo Alfredo Binda | — | — | — | 1 | 1 | — | 1 | 6 | — | — | — | 29 | 3 | 1 | NH | 2 | — | 20 | — | 4 | 6 |
| Strade Bianche | Race did not exist | | | | | | | | | — | — | 17 | — | 7 | 6 | 7 | 7 | — | 9 | — | 7 |
| Ronde van Drenthe | — | 3 | 2 | 8 | 15 | 1 | 1 | 1 | — | — | — | 7 | 5 | 11 | NH | — | — | — | — | NH | |
| Gent–Wevelgem | Race did not exist | | | | | | — | — | — | — | — | — | 12 | 13 | — | 1 | 2 | — | — | — | — |
| Dwars door Vlaanderen | Race did not exist | | | | | | | | | | | — | — | — | NH | — | — | 3 | 1 | DNS | — |
| Amstel Gold Race | Race did not exist | | | | | | | | | | | 53 | 10 | 3 | NH | 1 | — | 17 | 1 | 22 | |
| La Flèche Wallonne | 29 | 1 | 1 | 1 | 6 | 1 | 2 | 1 | 6 | — | 9 | — | — | 4 | 9 | 11 | — | — | — | — | |
| GP de Plouay | — | 7 | — | 2 | 2 | 3 | 1 | 1 | 2 | — | 12 | — | 2 | — | — | — | — | — | — | 2 | |
| Open de Suède Vårgårda | — | 10 | — | 1 | 11 | 17 | 3 | 1 | 4 | — | DNS | 2 | 1 | 2 | Not held | | DSQ | Not held | | | |

=== Major championships results ===
| Event | | 2006 | 2007 | 2008 | 2009 | 2010 | 2011 | 2012 | 2013 | 2014 | 2015 | 2016 | 2017 | 2018 | 2019 | 2020 | 2021 | 2022 | 2023 | 2024 | 2025 |
|---|---|---|---|---|---|---|---|---|---|---|---|---|---|---|---|---|---|---|---|---|---|
| Olympic Games | Time trial | Not held | | 14 | Not held | | | 16 | Not held | | | — | Not held | | | | — | Not held | | — | NH |
| Olympic Games | Road race | Not held | | 6 | Not held | | | 1 | Not held | | | 9 | Not held | | | | 5 | Not held | | 2 | NH |
| World Championships | Time trial | — | — | — | — | — | 10 | — | — | — | — | — | — | — | — | — | — | — | — | — | — |
| World Championships | Road race | 1 | 2 | 2 | 2 | 2 | 2 | 1 | 1 | 10 | — | 22 | 48 | — | 6 | 4 | 2 | 14 | 47 | 8 | — |
| World Championships | Team time trial | Race did not exist | | | | | | 4 | 2 | — | — | — | — | — | Not held | | | | | | |
| European Championships | Road race | Elite race did not exist | | | | | | | | | | 7 | 1 | 2 | 13 | 8 | DNF | — | — | — | — |
| National Championships | Time trial | 5 | — | — | 4 | 1 | 1 | — | — | 3 | — | — | — | — | — | NH | — | — | — | — | — |
| National Championships | Road race | 1 | 2 | 1 | 1 | 2 | 1 | 2 | 2 | 3 | — | 3 | — | 3 | 2 | 4 | 8 | 4 | 3 | 47 | 73 |

Legend
| — | Did not compete |
| DNF | Did not finish |
| DNS | Did not start |
| IP | In progress |
| NH | Not held |

=== Grand Tour record ===
| | 2007 | 2008 | 2009 | 2010 | 2011 | 2012 | 2013 | 2014 | 2015 | 2016 | 2017 | 2018 | 2019 | 2020 | 2021 | 2022 | 2023 | 2024 | 2025 |
| La Vuelta Femenina | Race did not exist | | | | | | | | | | | | | | | | 26 | 24 | 40 |
| Stages won | Race did not exist | | | | | | | | | | | | | | | | 2 (Note: Vos also won the stage one team time trial of the 2023 Vuelta along with two individual stage wins.) | 2 | 2 |
| Points classification | Race did not exist | | | | | | | | | | | | | | | | 1 | 1 | 1 |
| Giro Rosa | 12 | DNE | DNE | 7 | 1 | 1 | 6 | 1 | DNE | DNE | DNE | DNS-19 | 20 | 11 | DNS-9 | DNS-6 | 48 | DNE | DNS-7 |
| Stages won | 1 | — | — | 2 | 5 | 5 | 3 | 4 | — | — | — | 1 | 4 | 3 | 2 | 2 | 0 | — | 0 |
| Points classification | 1 | — | — | 1 | 1 | 1 | 1 | 1 | — | — | — | — | 2 | 1 | — | — | 3 | — | — |
| Mountains classification | NR | — | — | 7 | 1 | 3 | 4 | 7 | — | — | — | — | 9 | 4 | — | — | NR | — | — |
| Young rider classification | — | — | — | 1 | — | — | — | — | — | — | — | — | — | — | — | — | — | — | — |
| Tour de France Femmes | Race did not exist | | | | | | | | | | | | | | | 26 | DNF-7 | 31 | 37 |
| Stages won | Race did not exist | | | | | | | | | | | | | | | 2 | 0 | 0 | 1 |
| Points classification | Race did not exist | | | | | | | | | | | | | | | 1 | — | 1 | 2 |
| Mountains classification | Race did not exist | | | | | | | | | | | | | | | NR | — | 18 | NR |

Legend
| 1 | Winner |
| 2–3 | Top three-finish |
| 4–10 | Top ten-finish |
| 11– | Other finish |
| DNE | Did not enter |
| DNF-x | Did not finish (retired on stage x) |
| DNS-x | Did not start (not started on stage x) |
| HD-x | Finished outside time limit (occurred on stage x) |
| DSQ | Disqualified |
| N/A | Race/classification not held |
| NR | Not ranked in this classification |

== Track ==
2007
National Championships

1st Points race
1st Scratch
2nd Individual pursuit

UCI World Cup Classics

1st Points race, Beijing
1st Scratch, Beijing

2008
1st Points race, Olympic Games
1st Points race, UCI World Championships
1st Scratch, UCI World Cup Classics, Copenhagen
1st Four Days of Rotterdam (with Adrie Visser)
2010
1st Elimination, UCI World Cup Classics, Melbourne
2011
1st Scratch, UCI World Championships
2012
1st Madison, National Championships (with Roxane Knetemann)
1st Elimination, Revolution Series Manchester
