= 2012 Rabobank Women Cycling Team season =

2012 Rabobank Women Team
- UCI Team ranking: 1st

Season victories
- One-day races
- Stage race overall
- Best ranked rider: Marianne Vos (1st)

The 2012 season was the eighth for the Rabobank Women Team cycling team, which began as the DSB Bank team in 2005.

== Roster ==
Ages as of 1 January 2012.

| Rider | Date of birth |
|---|---|
| Tatiana Antoshina (RUS) | July 27, 1982 (aged 30) |
| Liesbet De Vocht (BEL) | January 5, 1979 (aged 33) |
| Sarah Düster (GER) | July 10, 1982 (aged 30) |
| Pauline Ferrand-Prévot (FRA) | February 10, 1992 (aged 20) |
| Thalita de Jong (NED) | November 6, 1993 (aged 19) |
| Lauren Kitchen (NOR) | November 21, 1990 (aged 22) |
| Roxane Knetemann (NED) | April 1, 1987 (aged 25) |

| Rider | Date of birth |
|---|---|
| Iris Slappendel (NED) | February 18, 1985 (aged 27) |
| Sabrina Stultiens (NED) | July 8, 1993 (aged 19) |
| Rebecca Talen (NED) | October 27, 1993 (aged 19) |
| Monique van der Vorst (NED) | November 20, 1984 (aged 28) |
| Sanne van Paassen (NED) | October 27, 1988 (aged 24) |
| Annemiek van Vleuten (NED) | October 8, 1982 (aged 30) |
| Marianne Vos (NED) | May 13, 1987 (aged 25) |

== Results ==
=== Season victories ===
Single day and stage races 2012
| Date | Nation | Race | Cat. | Winner |
|---|---|---|---|---|
| | | Ronde van Drenthe | | Marianne Vos |
| | | Novilon Eurocup Ronde van Drenthe | | Marianne Vos |
| | | Trofeo Alfredo Binda | | Marianne Vos |
| | | GP Stad Roeselare | | Annemiek van Vleuten |
| | | Overall Festival Luxembourgeois du cyclisme féminin Elsy Jacobs | | Marianne Vos |
| | | Prologue Overall Festival Luxembourgeois du cyclisme féminin Elsy Jacobs | | Annemiek van Vleuten |
| | | Stage 2 Festival Luxembourgeois du cyclisme féminin Elsy Jacobs | | Annemiek van Vleuten |
| | | Stage 1 Festival Luxembourgeois du cyclisme féminin Elsy Jacobs | | Marianne Vos |
| | | Bredene | | Liesbet De Vocht |
| | | Gooik | | Liesbet De Vocht |
| | | GP Comune di Cornaredo | | Iris Slappendel |
| | | Holland Hills Classic | | Annemiek van Vleuten |
| | | 7-Dorpenomloop Aalburg | | Annemiek van Vleuten |
| | | Stage 4 Iurreta-Emakumeen Bira | | Annemiek van Vleuten |
| | | Stage 1 Rabobank Ster Zeeuwsche Eilanden | | Iris Slappendel |
| | | Overall Giro d'Italia Femminile | | Marianne Vos |
| | | Stage 8 Giro d'Italia Femminile | | Marianne Vos |
| | | Stage 7 Giro d'Italia Femminile | | Marianne Vos |
| | | Stage 4 Giro d'Italia Femminile | | Marianne Vos |
| | | Stage 2 Giro d'Italia Femminile | | Marianne Vos |
| | | Stage 1 Giro d'Italia Femminile | | Marianne Vos |
| | | Overall Tour Féminin en Limousin | | Marianne Vos |
| | | Stage 1 Tour Féminin en Limousin | | Marianne Vos |
| | | Stage 4 Tour Féminin en Limousin | | Marianne Vos |
| | | Olympic Road Championship | | Marianne Vos |
| | | Open de Suède Vårgårda | | Iris Slappendel |
| | | GP de Plouay | | Marianne Vos |
| | | Prologue Giro della Toscana Femminile | | Annemiek van Vleuten |
| | | Overall BrainWash Ladies Tour | | Marianne Vos |
| | | Stage 4 BrainWash Ladies Tour | | Marianne Vos |
| | | Stage 6 BrainWash Ladies Tour | | Marianne Vos |

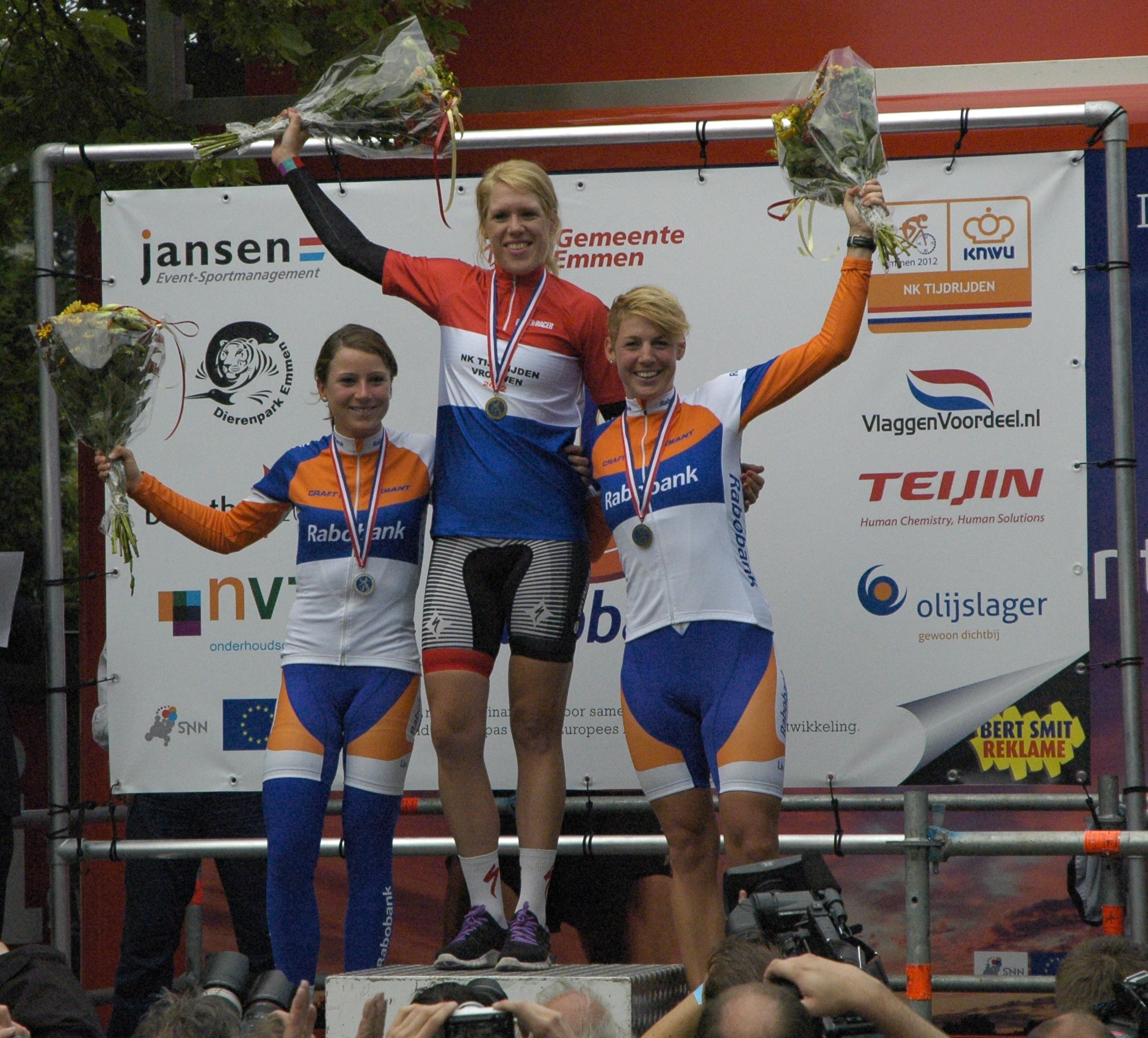
At the Dutch Time Trial Championships, Van Vleuten and Slappendel finished second and third behind Ellen van Dijk (Specialized–lululemon)

National, Continental and World champions 2012
| Date | Discipline | Jersey | Winner |
|---|---|---|---|
| 21 June | French National Road Race Championships | | Pauline Ferrand-Prévot |
| 23 June | Dutch National Road Race Championships | | Annemiek van Vleuten |
| 29 July | Olympic Road Race Champion | | Marianne Vos |
| 15 August | Belgian National Time Trial Champion | | Liesbet De Vocht |
| 22 September | Road Race World Champion | | Marianne Vos |

== Results in major races ==
=== Single day races ===
Results at the 2012 UCI Women's Road World Cup races
| Date | # | Race | Best rider | Place |
|---|---|---|---|---|
| 10 March | 1 | Ronde van Drenthe | (Netherlands) Marianne Vos | 1st |
| 25 March | 2 | Trofeo Alfredo Binda-Comune di Cittiglio | (Netherlands) Marianne Vos | 1st |
| 1 April | 3 | Tour of Flanders | (France) Pauline Ferrand-Prévot | 11th |
| 18 April | 4 | La Flèche Wallonne Féminine | (Netherlands) Marianne Vos | 2nd |
| 13 May | 5 | Tour of Chongming Island | (Belgium) Liesbet De Vocht | 7th |
| 17 August | 6 | Open de Suède Vårgårda TTT | Rabobank Women Team | 3rd |
| 19 August | 7 | Open de Suède Vårgårda | (Netherlands) Iris Slappendel | 5th |
| 25 August | 8 | GP de Plouay | (Netherlands) Marianne Vos | 1st |
| Final individual classification | | | (Netherlands) Marianne Vos | 1st |
| Final team classification | | | Rabobank Women Team | 1st |

UCI Road World Championships
| Date | Race | Place |
|---|---|---|
| 16 September | UCI Road World Championships – Women's team time trial | 4th |

=== Grand Tours ===
Results of the team in the grand tours
| Grand tour | Giro d'Italia Femminile |
|---|---|
| Rider (classification) | Marianne Vos (1st) |
| Victories | 5 stage wins |

== UCI World Ranking ==
The team finished first in the UCI ranking for teams.

Individual UCI World Ranking
| Rank | Rider | Points |
|---|---|---|
| 1 | (Netherlands) Marianne Vos | 1666 |
| 7 | (Netherlands) Annemiek van Vleuten | 558 |
| 20 | (Belgium) Liesbet De Vocht | 317 |
| 33 | (Netherlands) Iris Slappendel | 208 |
| 37 | (France) Pauline Ferrand-Prévot | 191.5 |
| 97 | (Germany) Sarah Düster | 58 |
| 98 | (Russia) Tatiana Antoshina | 57 |
| 188 | (Netherlands) Thalita de Jong | 15 |
| 223 | (Netherlands) Roxane Knetemann | 12 |
| 249 | (Netherlands) Sanne van Paassen | 10 |
| 328 | (Australia) Lauren Kitchen | 6 |
| 442 | (Netherlands) Sabrina Stultiens | 2 |
