= 2022 UCI Mountain Bike Marathon World Championships – Women's race =

Women's race at the 2022 UCI Mountain Bike Marathon World Championships
- Venue: Haderslev
- Date: 17 September 2022

Medalists
gold medal	Pauline Ferrand-Prévot	France
silver medal	Annie Last	Great Britain
bronze medal	Jolanda Neff	Switzerland

The women's race at the 2022 UCI Mountain Bike Marathon World Championships took place in Haderslev on 17 September 2022.

== Result ==
50 competitors from 21 nations started. 46 competitors reached the finish line.

Rank	Athlete	Nation	Result	Behind
1st place, gold medalist(s)	Pauline Ferrand-Prévot	France	3:36.58	
2nd place, silver medalist(s)	Annie Last	Great Britain	3:36.58	+0:00
3rd place, bronze medalist(s)	Jolanda Neff	Switzerland	3:37.00	+0:02
4	Sofie Heby Pedersen	Denmark	3:37.12	+0:14
5	Caroline Bohé	Denmark	3:39:42	+2:44
6	Giada Specia	Italy	3:40:41	+3:43
7	Malene Degn	Switzerland	3:40:42	+3:44
8	Mona Mitterwallner	Austria	3:40.45	+3:46
9	Vera Looser	Namibia	3:40.52	+3:54
10	Kataržina Sosna	Lithuania	3:41.47	+4:48
11	Irina Lützelschwab	Switzerland	3:41.52	+4:54
12	Ann-Dorthe Lisbygd	Denmark	3:42.14	+5:16
13	Janina Wüst	Switzerland	3:42.39	+5:41
14	Lea Davison	United States	3:42.49	+5:51
15	Claudia Peretti	Italy	3:43.50	+6:52
16	Amy Wakefield	United States	3:43.50	+6:52
17	Klara Skovgård Hansen	Denmark	3:43.52	+6:54
18	Janni Spangsberg	Denmark	3:44.10	+7:11
19	Estelle Morel	France	3:45.10	+7:12
20	Rosa van Doorn	Netherlands	3:45.40	+8:42
21	Terese Andersson	Sweden	3:45.56	+8:58
22	Viktoria Smidth Knudsen	Denmark	3:48.56	+11:58
23	Janka Keseg Števková	Slovakia	3:50.04	+13:06
24	Janelle Uibokand	Estonia	3:50.05	+13:07
25	Liisa Ehrberg	Estonia	3:50.07	+13:09
26	Milena Kalašová	Czech Republic	3:50.07	+13:09
27	Costanza Fasolis	Italy	3:50.08	+13:10
28	Nellie Larsson	Sweden	3:50.10	+13:12
29	Lauren Stephens	United States	3:50.15	+13:17
30	Lejla Njemevi	Bosnia and Herzegovina	3:51.11	+14:13
31	Stefanie Dohrn	Germany	3:54.22	+17:24
32	Martina Krahulcová	Czech Republic	3:56.39	+19:41
33	Chiara Burato	Italy	3:57.58	+21:00
34	Jennie Stenerhag	Sweden	3:58.44	+21:46
35	Jessica Benz	United States	3:59.24	+22:26
36	Kelly Catale	United States	4:00.23	+23:25
37	Alesia Nay	Switzerland	4:00.54	+23:56
38	Amy Henchoz	Great Britain	4:03.23	+26:24
39	Christina Wiejak	Great Britain	4:06.33	+29:35
40	Tanja Priller	Germany	4:09.35	+32:37
41	Barbara Borowiecka	Poland	4:13.58	+36:59
42	Daniela Höfler	Germany	4:18.12	+41:14
43	Tanja Frühmesser	Germany	4:19.43	+42:45
44	Evelyn Sulzer	Austria	4:23.46	+46:48
45	Charlotte Welter	France	4:28.00	+51:02
46	Rachel Connerney	Great Britain	4:31.11	+54:13
	Jana Jolovi	Serbia	DNF	
	Hildegunn Hovdenak	Norway	DNF	
	Karla Štpánová	Czech Republic	DNF	
	Aikaterini Eleftheriadou	Greece	DQF	
