= Pauline Ferrand-Prévot =

French bicycle racer (born 1992)

Pauline Ferrand-Prévot CLH OLY
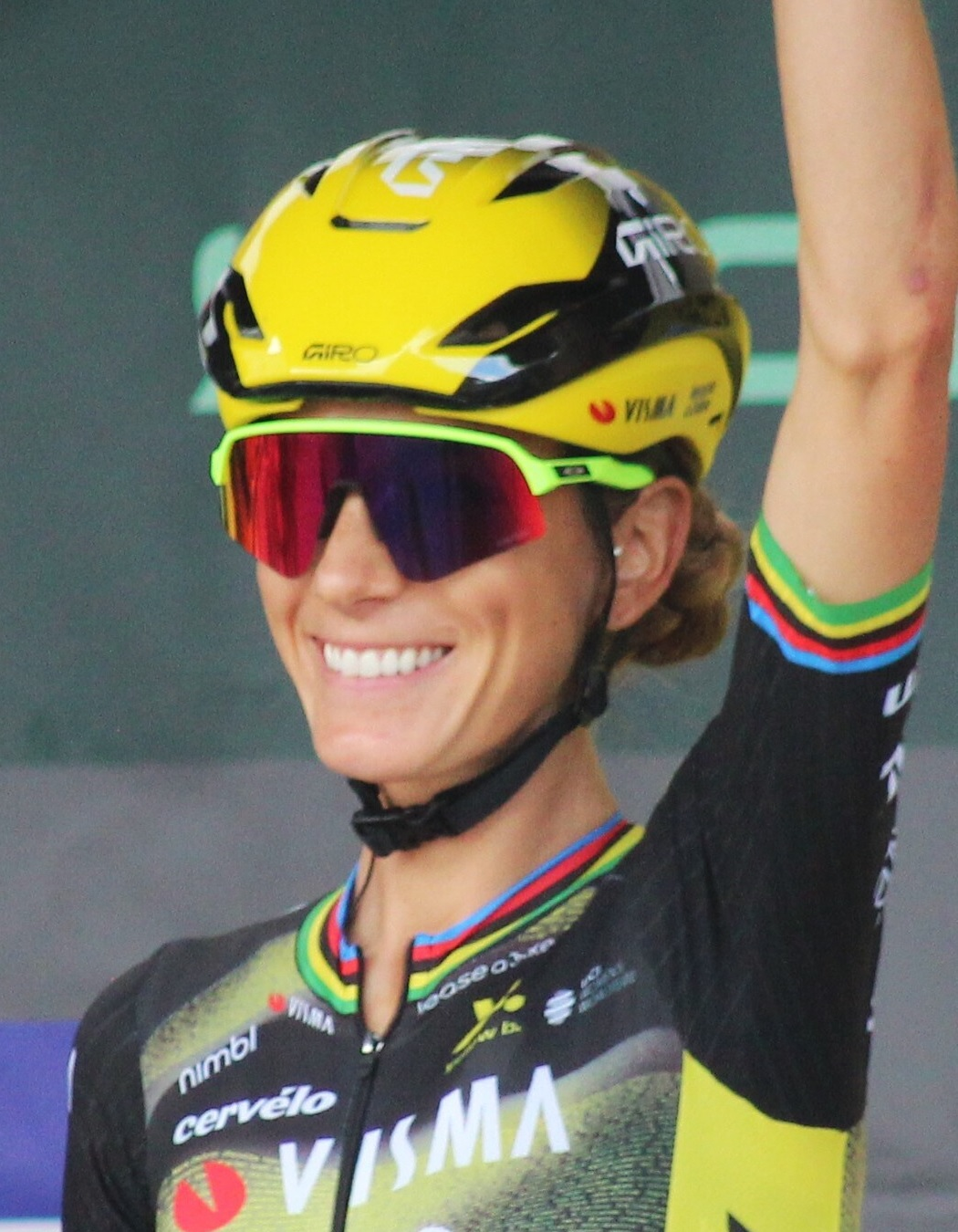
- Ferrand-Prévot at the 2025 Tour de France Femmes

Personal information
- Full name: Pauline Ferrand-Prévot
- Nicknames: PFP; Papillon
- Born: 10 February 1992 (age 34) Reims, France
- Height: 165 cm (5 ft 5 in)

Cycling career
- Sport: Cycling
- Current team: Visma–Lease a Bike
- Disciplines: Road; Cyclo-cross
- Role: Rider
- Rider type: All-rounder (road); Cross-country (mountain biking)

Amateur teams
- 2009: Team Scott–Valloire Galibier
- 2010: AC Bazancourt–Reims
- 2011: Lapierre International

Professional teams
- 2012–2016: Rabobank-Liv Woman Cycling Team
- 2012: →Rabobank–Giant Offroad Team
- 2013: →Giant Pro XC Team
- 2017–2020: Canyon//SRAM
- 2021–2022: Absolute–Absalon–BMC
- 2023–2024: INEOS Grenadiers
- 2025–: Visma–Lease a Bike

Major wins
- Cyclo-cross World Championships (2015) National Championships (2014, 2015, 2018) Gravel World Championships (2022) Mountain bike Olympic Games XC (2024) World XC Championships (2015, 2019, 2020, 2022, 2023) World Marathon Championships (2019, 2022) European XC Championships (2020, 2021) National XC Championships (2014, 2015, 2016, 2019) XC World Cup 9 individual wins (2014, 2015, 2019, 2020, 2022, 2024) Road Major Tours Tour de France General classification (2025) 2 individual stages (2025) Giro d'Italia Young rider classification (2014) 1 individual stage (2015) One-day races and Classics World Road Race Championships (2014) National Road Race Championships (2014–2015) National Time Trial Championships (2012–2014) Paris–Roubaix (2025) La Flèche Wallonne (2014) Other Vélo d'Or (2025)
Medal record
Representing (France) France
Women's road bicycle racing
World Championships
Gold medal – first place	2014 Ponferrada	Road race
European Championships
Gold medal – first place	2009 Ostende	Junior time trial
Silver medal – second place	2010 Ankara	Junior road race
Silver medal – second place	2010 Ankara	Junior time trial
Bronze medal – third place	2009 Ostende	Junior road race
Women's mountain bike racing
Olympic Games
Gold medal – first place	2024 Paris	Cross-country
World Championships
Gold medal – first place	2014 Hafjell	Team relay
Gold medal – first place	2015 Vallnord	Cross-country
Gold medal – first place	2015 Vallnord	Team relay
Gold medal – first place	2016 Nové Město	Team relay
Gold medal – first place	2019 Mont-Sainte-Anne	Cross-country
Gold medal – first place	2019 Grächen – St. Niklaus	Marathon
Gold medal – first place	2020 Leogang	Cross-country
Gold medal – first place	2022 Les Gets	Cross-country
Gold medal – first place	2022 Les Gets	Short track
Gold medal – first place	2022 Haderslev	Marathon
Gold medal – first place	2023 Glentress Forest	Cross-country
Gold medal – first place	2023 Glentress Forest	Short track
Silver medal – second place	2013 Pietermaritzburg	Under-23 cross-country
Silver medal – second place	2024 Vallnord	Short track
Bronze medal – third place	2011 Champéry	Under-23 cross-country
Bronze medal – third place	2017 Cairns	Short track
Bronze medal – third place	2017 Cairns	Team relay
Bronze medal – third place	2019 Mont-Sainte-Anne	Team relay
Bronze medal – third place	2021 Val di Sole	Short track
European Championship
Gold medal – first place	2009 Zoetermeer	Junior cross-country
Gold medal – first place	2014 St. Wendel	Under-23 cross-country
Gold medal – first place	2020 Monteceneri	Cross-country
Gold medal – first place	2021 Novi Sad	Cross-country
Gold medal – first place	2024 Cheile Grădiștei	Short track
Silver medal – second place	2016 Huskvarna	Team relay
Silver medal – second place	2018 Glasgow	Cross-country
Silver medal – second place	2022 Munich	Cross-country
Women's Cyclo-cross
World Championships
Gold medal – first place	Tábor 2015	Elite
European Championship
Bronze medal – third place	2011 Lucca	Elite
Women's gravel bicycle racing
World Championships
Gold medal – first place	2022 Veneto	Elite

Pauline Ferrand-Prévot (French pronunciation: [polin fɛʁɑ̃pʁevo]; born 10 February 1992) is a French cyclist who rides for UCI Women's World Tour team Visma–Lease a Bike. In addition to road racing, Ferrand-Prévot has also competed in mountain biking, cyclo-cross and gravel cycling during her career, winning the world title in each discipline.

In mountain biking, Ferrand-Prévot won multiple times at the UCI Mountain Bike World Championships, taking cross-country (2015, 2019, 2020, 2022, 2023), marathon (2019, 2022) and short track (2022, 2023) titles. She won the cross-country at the French National Mountain Bike Championships in 2014, 2015, 2016 and 2019. At the 2024 Summer Olympics, she won the gold medal in the cross-country mountain biking event.

In road cycling, she was the youngest competitor in the women's road race at the 2012 Summer Olympics, in which she finished eighth. In 2014, she won the road race at the UCI Road World Championships. She won the French National Road Race Championships in 2014 and 2015, and the French National Time Trial Championships three times between 2012 and 2014. After concentrating on other cycling disciplines, she returned to the road in 2025 – winning both Paris–Roubaix Femmes and Tour de France Femmes.

In cyclo-cross, she won the 2015 UCI Cyclo-cross World Championships, and the French National Cyclo-cross Championships in 2014, 2015 and 2018. In gravel cycling, she became the inaugural winner of the UCI Gravel World Championships in 2022.

During the 2015 season, aged just 23, she became the first person in the history of cycling to simultaneously hold the world road title, world cyclo-cross title and world cross-country mountain bike titles.

== Career ==
=== 2009–2010: Triple Junior World Champion ===
In July 2009, Ferrand-Prévot took part in the European Road Championships as a first year junior, where she narrowly won the Junior European time trial title ahead of Ukrainian Hanna Solovey. Four days later she placed third in the road race. Later in the same month, she won the junior European cross country championships, taking her second European title in less than 10 days in two different disciplines. She then participated in the World Junior Championships, winning silver in the time trial behind Hanna Solovey. In late August Ferrand-Prévot won both National Road titles in the junior category. In September, she won her first world title at the World cross country championship, whilst in October, she won the junior Chrono des Nations.

Ferrand-Prévot began her 2010 season competing in cyclo-cross. For women, there is no junior category which meant that she had to compete with the elite athletes. She came eighth in the World Cyclo-cross championships, more than two minutes behind future teammate Marianne Vos. After the cyclo-cross season, she was victorious at the City of Pujols road race, one of the constituent rounds of the Coupe de France, and would go on to top the final ranking in the Coupe de France for juniors. Further, she won a stage of the Circuit de Borsele junior, finishing fourth overall. She competed in the junior mountain bike World Cup, winning the Offenburg round and finished second in the Houffalize round. In mid-July, at the European Championships, Ferrand-Prévot had to settle for silver in both the time trial and road race. Ferrand-Prévot then competed in the junior World road race Championships in Offida, Italy, finishing second in the time trial. She retained her junior national road titles. In September she defended successfully the junior Mountain bike world championships in MTB at Mont-Sainte-Anne in Canada, becoming the second rider after Nicole Cooke to hold both the road and mountain-bike world title in the same year.

=== 2011–2013: The first professional years ===
Ferrand-Prévot began the 2011 season with a second place in the national cyclo-cross championships. In late January, she took eighth in the World Championship cyclo-cross. She was then selected to participate in the Trofeo Alfredo Binda-Comune di Cittiglio for the French national road team, the first round of the 2011 UCI Women's Road World Cup achieving ninth place. After a fourth place in Halle-Buizingen, she finished seventh in the women's La Flèche Wallonne atop the Mur de Huy. In May, she went on to participate in two rounds of the UCI Under-23 MTB World Cup taking victory in both rounds. Ferrand-Prévot stated in mid-May that she would continue to ride in both disciplines for at least two more seasons. After a victory in the Coupe de France she participated in the two North American rounds of the Under-23 MTB World Cup winning both rounds again.

In July, one year ahead of the London Olympics, she finished fifth in the pre-Olympic race. She then abandoned the MTB European championship. In August, after taking second place in the Val di Sole round of the Under-23 MTB World cup, she was crowned the overall winner. In November Ferrand-Prévot won the bronze medal at the European Cyclo-cross championships. In late November, Rabobank Women Team announced they had signed her for the 2012 and 2013 seasons.

In April 2012, Ferrand-Prévot achieved her first podium in the MTB World Cup, during the second round in Houffalize. She was then selected for the Olympic Mountain bike test event. In June, at Saint-Amand-les-Eaux, she won her first elite national time trial championship, completing the 26.8-kilometre (16.7-mile) loop in 36 minutes and 55 seconds, beating Audrey Cordon-Ragot by 17 seconds. She also won the Under-23 title. In July, she finished fourth in the elite national Mountain Bike championships but won the Under-23 title.

=== 2014: The career year ===
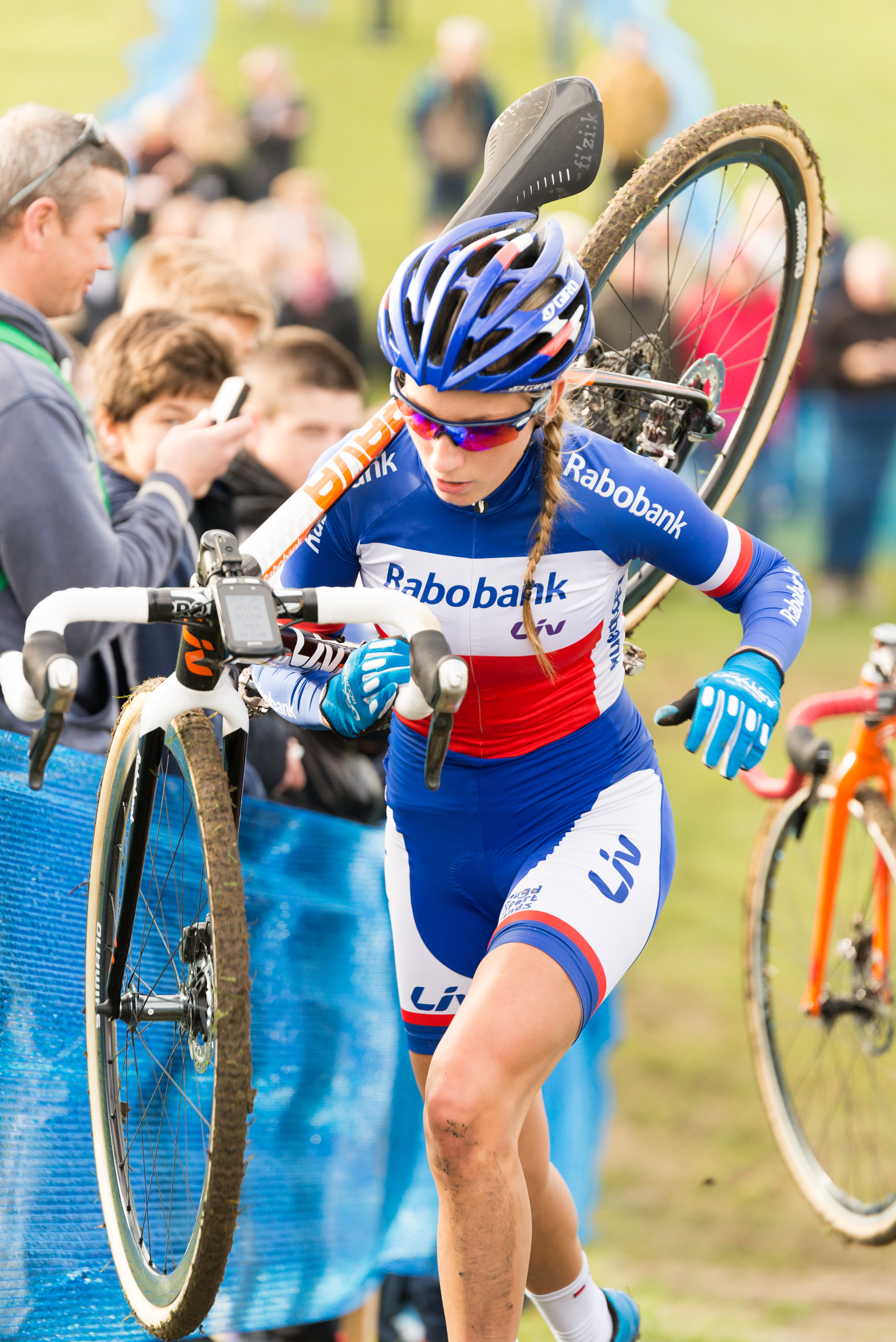
Ferrand-Prévot at the 2014 Cyclo-Cross international de Dijon wearing the French national champion's kit

Early in the season, Ferrand-Prévot won her first elite national cyclo-cross title. In late March, she finished fifth at the Trofeo Alfredo Binda-Comune di Cittiglio. In April she won the La Flèche Wallonne Féminine ahead of Lizzie Armitstead and Elisa Longo Borghini. In July, Ferrand-Prévot came second in the Giro Rosa just 15 seconds behind teammate Marianne Vos becoming the second French woman to reach the podium of the Giro Rosa after the Catherine Marsal victory in 1990. She later took the overall victory at the Emakumeen Euskal Bira, her first stage race win, while collecting two stage wins.

In July, Ferrand-Prévot became the first French cyclist to accumulate four national titles in a single season (road race, time trial, cyclo-cross and mountain bike). She also recorded two wins in the elite Mountain Bike World Cup and finally finished tenth overall in the Mountain Bike World Cup. After taking victory at the Under-23 European Cross-Country Championships, she won her first world title in the mixed relay.

Late in the road season, Ferrand-Prévot took part in the Grand Prix de Plouay, last round of the Road World Cup, taking 3rd place. She later finished sixth overall in the competition. In September, 19 years after Jeannie Longo won the fabled rainbow jersey, she became World Road Race champion in Ponferrada, Spain. Later in the season, she finished second in the Vélo d'or Français behind Jean-Christophe Péraud and ahead of track World Champion François Pervis. Ferrand-Prévot was also selected "international cyclist of the year" by the American publication VeloNews.

=== 2015: World champion in cyclo-cross and cross-country ===
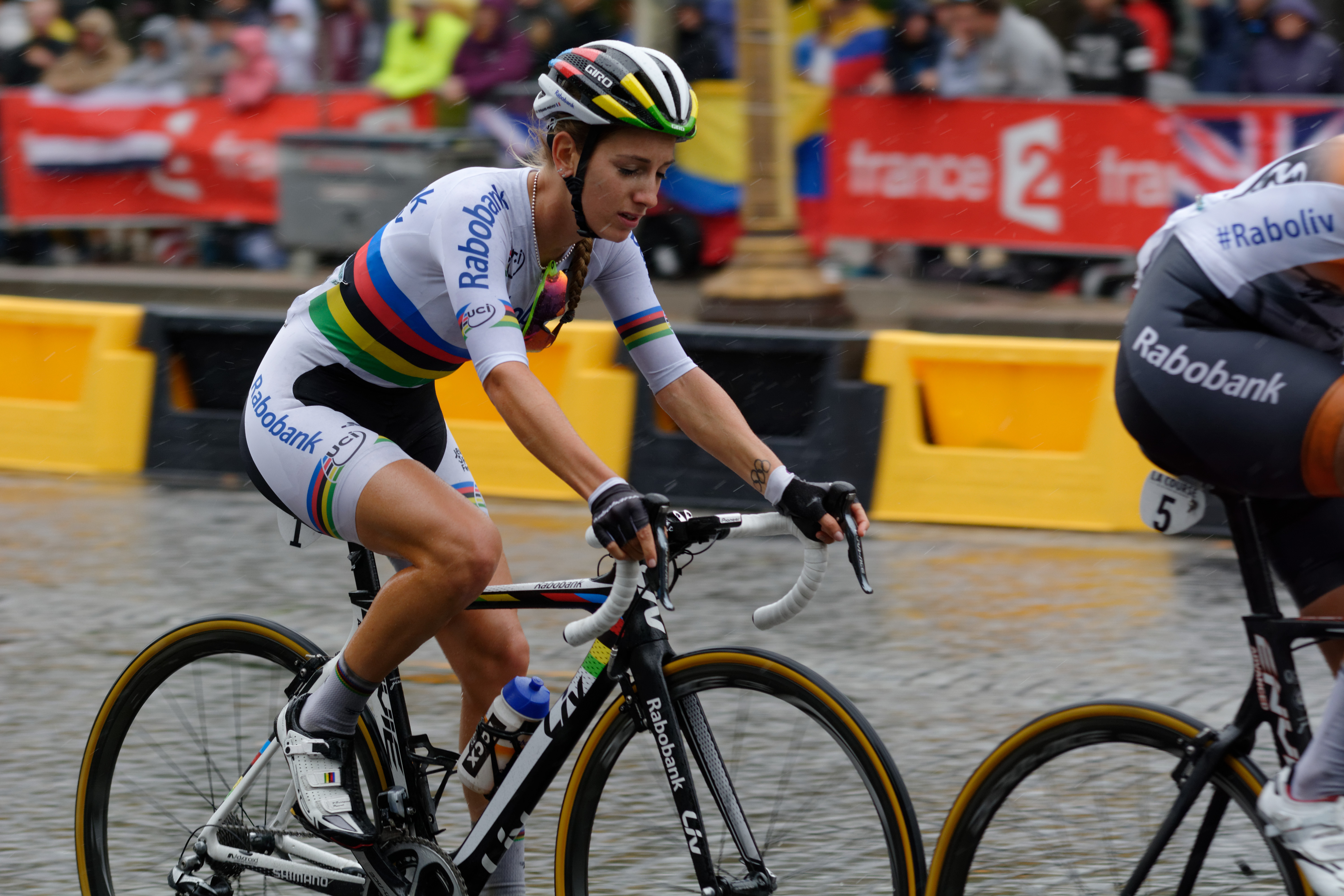
Ferrand-Prévot at the 2015 La Course by Le Tour de France

Ferrand-Prévot started the season off with retaining her national cyclo-cross championship. A week of ahead of the cyclo-cross world championships, she finished on the podium in the final race of the cyclo-cross World Cup in Hoogerheide. In January, she won the Cyclo-cross world title, ahead of Sanne Cant and seven-time champion Marianne Vos. She finished runner-up at the Trofeo Alfredo Binda-Comune di Cittiglio behind Lizzie Armitstead. In June, Ferrand-Prévot announced she had been suffering from sciatica which had ruined the start of her season. She returned to competition in the French national road race championships retaining her road title but only finishing third in the time trial. At the Giro Rosa, she finished ninth in the prologue but lost nearly two minutes on the leaders after the second stage. Winner of Stage 5 at Aprica, she finished 6th overall.

In August, Ferrand-Prévot started her mountain bike season with the goal of achieving a third world title in three different disciplines. She finished third in the Mont-Sainte-Anne round of World Cup and won the Windham round by more than a minute. On the road, she suffered a fall in the last kilometer of La Course by Le Tour de France as she did in 2014, but then went on to come third again at the Grand Prix de Plouay.

In the World mountain biking championship, she retained her mixed relay title (with Jordan Sarrou, Anthony Phillip and Victor Koretzky) and then added the World cross-country title.

In late November 2015 Ferrand-Prévot acquired a tibial plateau fracture during training, forcing her to refrain from racing for at least six weeks and miss most of the 2015–2016 cyclocross season.

=== 2016 ===
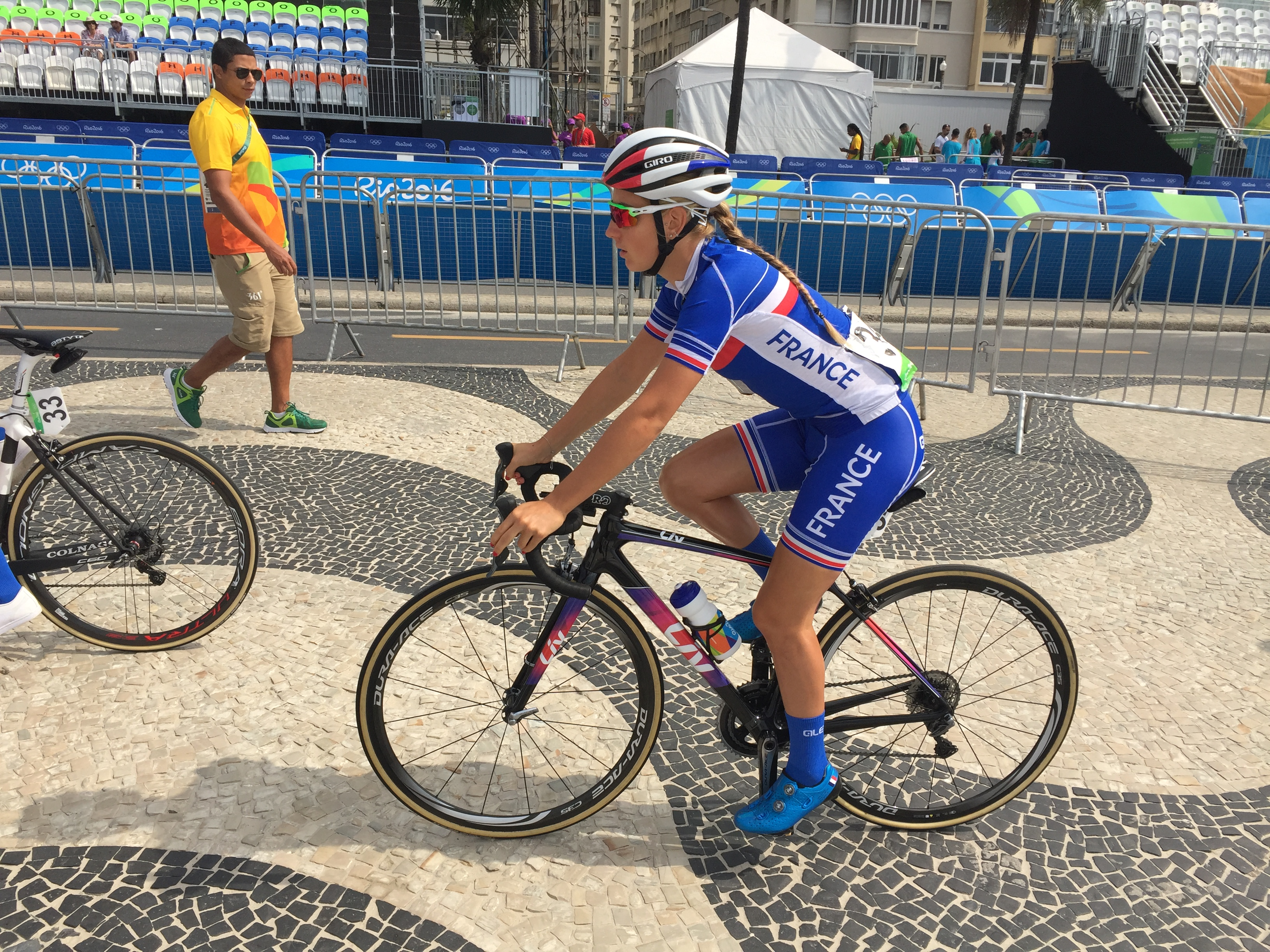
Ferrand-Prévot at the 2016 Summer Olympics

Ferrand-Prévot endured a difficult 2016 season. She competed in the 2016 Summer Olympics in Rio de Janeiro, however she only finished 26th in the road race and abandoned the cross-country mountain bike race due to struggling with the effects of the tibial fracture she had sustained during the winter. She subsequently ended her season after the Games. In September 2016, after five years with the Rabobank team it was announced that Ferrand-Prévot would join Canyon//SRAM for the 2017 season.

=== 2018 ===
She competed in the Cross Country European Championships in Glasgow, finishing 2nd behind Jolanda Neff.

=== 2022 ===
Ferrand-Prévot became the inaugural winner of the UCI Gravel World Championships in the women's race. She also became the first person to ever win the World Championships for all three disciplines on the mountain bike: Cross Country Olympic (XCO), Cross Country Marathon (XCM) and Cross Country Short Track (XCC).

=== 2024: Olympic mountain bike Gold ===
At the 2024 Summer Olympics, she won the gold medal in the cross-country mountain biking event in front of a home crowd.

=== 2025: Returning to the road ===
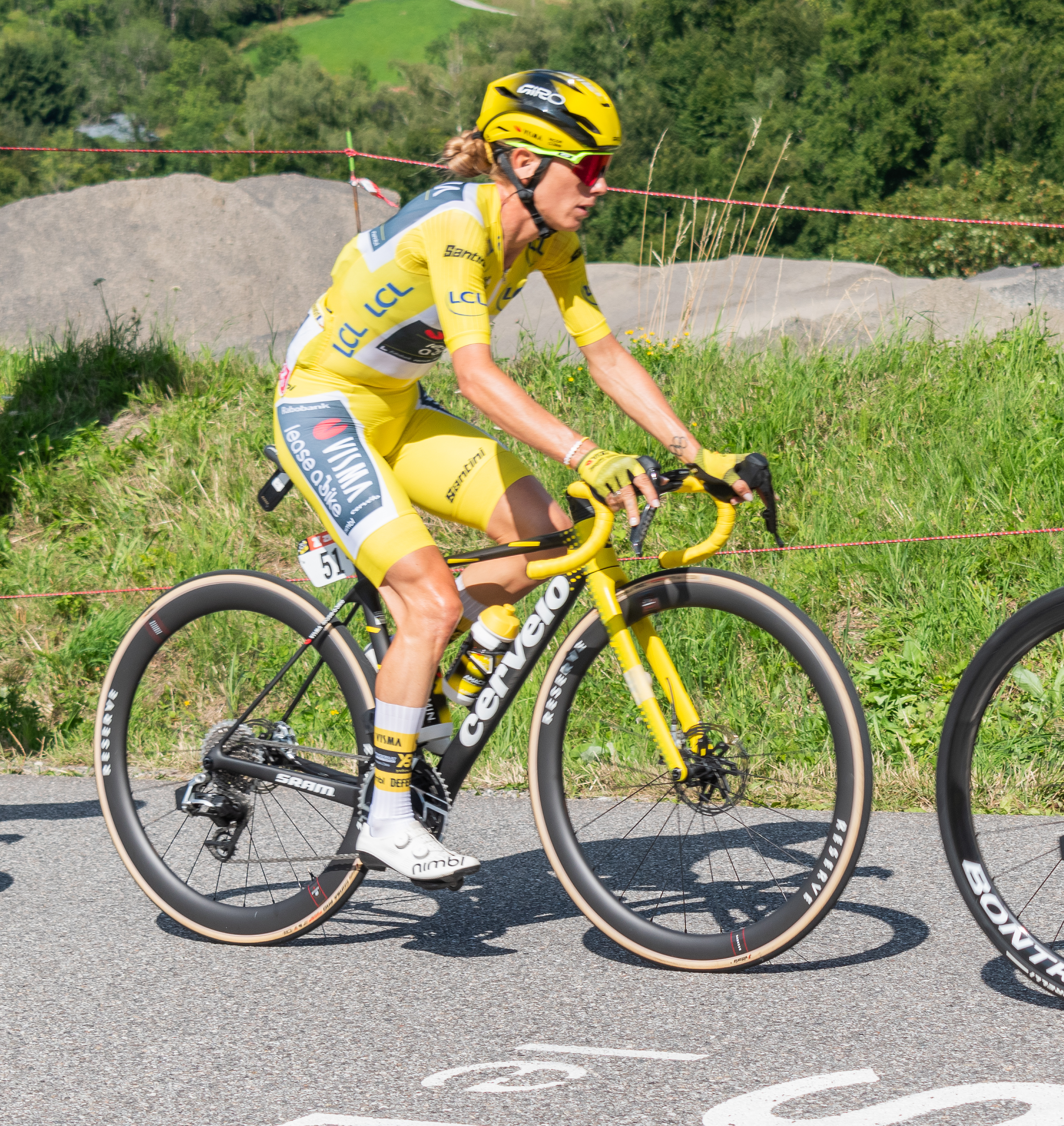
Ferrand-Prévot wearing the yellow jersey during the final stage of the 2025 Tour de France Femmes

In 2025, Ferrand-Prévot returned to road cycling for the first time since 2018, signing a three year deal with Visma–Lease a Bike. She finished third at Strade Bianche, second at Tour of Flanders, before winning Paris–Roubaix Femmes – her first win on the road since 2015. Following her win at Paris–Roubaix Femmes, Ferrand-Prévot expressed that her main goal was to win the Tour de France Femmes. On 2 August, in the penultimate stage of the women's Tour de France, she broke away from Sarah Gigante in the final climb up the Col de la Madeleine, taking the yellow jersey with a 2:37 lead on Gigante in the general standings and 3:18 ahead of Demi Vollering, and she went on to win the overall race.

== Personal life ==
Ferrand-Prévot comes from a cycling family: her uncle Ludovic Dubau was 1994 French champion in cross-country mountain biking and competed in the 2000 Summer Olympics.

Her nickname PFP comes from her initials. Ferrand-Prévot is married to Dutch cyclist Dylan van Baarle, with whom she lives in Monaco.

== Career achievements ==
=== Major championships timeline ===
Event		2008	2009	2010	2011	2012	2013	2014	2015	2016	2017	2018	2019	2020	2021	2022	2023	2024
Olympic Games	MTB XC	—	Not held			25	Not held			DNF	Not held				10	Not held		1
Olympic Games	Road race	—	Not held			8	Not held			26	Not held				—	Not held		—
World Championships	Cyclo-cross	—	20	8	8	—	—	17	1	—	—	24	—	—	—	—	—	—
World Championships	Gravel	Event did not exist														1	—	—
World Championships	MTB XC	—	—	—	—	—	—	—	1	16	3	DNF	1	1	DNF	1	1	14
World Championships	Marathon	—	—	—	—	—	—	—	—	—	—	—	1	—	—	1	—	—
World Championships	Road race	—	—	—	—	47	13	1	6	—	11	—	—	—	—	—	—	—
European Championships	Cyclo-cross	12	19	10	3	—	—	—	—	—	—	—	—	—	—	7	—	—
European Championships	Gravel	Event did not exist															—	—
European Championships	MTB XC	—	—	—	—	—	—	—	—	DNF	12	2	—	1	1	2	—	DNF
European Championships	Marathon	—	—	—	—	—	—	—	—	—	—	—	—	—	—	—	—	—
European Championships	Road race	Elite race did not exist								—	—	—	—	—	—	—	—	—
National Championships	Cyclo-cross	—	5	3	2	2	2	1	1	—	—	1	—	—	—	—	—	—
National Championships	MTB XC	—	—	—	—	4	2	1	1	1	—	—	1	3	2	2	—	—
National Championships	Marathon	—	—	—	—	—	—	—	—	—	—	—	—	3	—	2	—	—
National Championships	Road race	—	—	—	14	—	6	1	1	4	—	18	20	—	12	—	—	—
National Championships	Time trial	—	—	—	4	1	1	1	3	—	—	—	—	—	5	—	—	—

=== Cyclo-cross ===
2009–2010
Coupe de France

2nd Saint-Quentin
3rd Besançon

3rd National Championships
2010–2011
2nd National Championships
Coupe de France

2nd Saint-Jean-de-Monts
3rd Saverne
3rd Miramas

UCI World Cup

5th Pontchâteau

2011–2012
1st Overall Coupe la France

1st Rodez
2nd Lignières-en-Berry
3rd Besançon

2nd National Championships
Superprestige

2nd Hamme

3rd UEC European Championships
UCI World Cup

5th Heusden-Zolder

2012–2013
1st Overall Coupe de France

1st Pontchâteau
2nd Besançon

2nd National Championships
2013–2014
1st National Championships
Coupe de France

1st Flamanville

2nd Kalmthout
UCI World Cup

4th Rome
5th Namur

2014–2015
1st UCI World Championships
1st National Championships
Superprestige

2nd Diegem

2nd Overijse
2nd Hasselt
UCI World Cup

3rd Heusden-Zolder
3rd Hoogerheide
5th Namur

2017–2018
1st National Championships
1st Overijse
Superprestige

2nd Diegem

UCI World Cup

3rd Nommay
4th Heusden-Zolder
5th Namur

==== UCI World Cup results ====
Season	1	2	3	4	5	6	7	8	9	10	11	12	13	14	Rank	Points
2008–2009	KAL —	TAB —	PIJ —	KOK —	IGO —	NOM; 25	HOF —	ROU —	MIL —						53	6
2009–2010	TRE —	PLZ —	NOM —	KOK —	IGO —	KAL —	ZOL —	ROU; 11	HOO; 17						28	34
2010–2011	AIG —	PLZ —	KOK; 16	KAL; 6	ZOL; 7	PON; 5	HOO; 7								13	136
2011–2012	PLZ —	TAB —	KOK —	IGO —	NAM; 9	ZOL; 5	LIE —	HOO —							23	59
2012–2013	TAB —	PLZ —	KOK; 17	ROU; 16	NAM —	ZOL; 8	ROM —	HOO —							25	55
2013–2014	VAL —	TAB —	KOK —	NAM; 5	ZOL —	ROM; 4	NOM; 30								20	76
2014–2015	VAL —	KOK —	MIL —	NAM; 5	ZOL; 3	HOO; 3									11	125
2017–2018	IOW —	WAT —	KOK —	BOG —	ZEV —	NAM; 5	ZOL; 4	NOM; 3	HOO; DNF						23	180
2022–2023	WAT —	FAY —	TAB —	MAA —	BER —	OVE —	HUL —	ANT; DNF	DUB; 7	VAL —	GAV; 27	ZON —	BEN —	BES —	43	19

=== Gravel ===
2022
1st UCI World Championships

=== Mountain bike ===
2009
1st Cross-country, UCI World Junior Championships
1st Cross-country, UEC European Junior Championships
3rd Cross-country, National Junior Championships
2010
1st Cross-country, UCI World Junior Championships
UCI Junior XCO World Cup

1st Offenburg
2nd Houffalize

2011
1st Overall UCI Under-23 XCO World Cup

1st Dalby Forest
1st Offenburg
1st Mont-Sainte-Anne
1st Windham
2nd Val di Sole
3rd Nové Město

3rd Cross-country, UCI World Under-23 Championships
2012
1st Cross-country, National Under-23 Championships
4th Cross-country, UEC European Under-23 Championships
UCI XCO World Cup

4th Houffalize

2013
1st Cross-country, National Under-23 Championships
1st Saint-Pompon
2nd Cross-country, UCI World Under-23 Championships
2nd Cross-country, National Championships
2014
1st Team relay, UCI World Championships
1st Cross-country, UEC European Under-23 Championships
1st Cross-country, National Championships
1st Cross-country, National Under-23 Championships
UCI XCO World Cup

1st Nové Město
1st Albstadt
3rd Méribel

1st Lons-le-Saunier
2015
UCI World Championships

1st Cross-country
1st Team relay

1st Cross-country, National Championships
UCI XCO World Cup

1st Windham
3rd Nové Město
3rd Mont-Sainte-Anne

1st Saint-Pompon
2016
1st Team relay, UCI World Championships
1st Cross-country, National Championships
2017
1st Roc d'Azur
UCI XCO World Cup

2nd Mont-Sainte-Anne

UCI World Championships

3rd Cross-country
3rd Team relay

2018
2nd Cross-country, UEC European Championships
UCI XCO World Cup

2nd Stellenbosch
3rd Nové Město
4th Val di Sole
4th La Bresse

UCI XCC World Cup

2nd Nové Město

2019
UCI World Championships

1st Cross-country
1st Marathon

1st Cross-country, National Championships
UCI XCO World Cup

1st Val di Sole
1st Snowshoe
3rd Lenzerheide
5th Les Gets

UCI XCC World Cup

1st Lenzerheide
2nd Les Gets
2nd Snowshoe
3rd Val di Sole

Internazionali d'Italia Series

2nd La Thuile

French Cup

3rd Jeumont

Swiss Bike Cup

3rd Leukerbad

2020
1st Cross-country, UCI World Championships
1st Cross-country, UEC European Championships
UCI XCO World Cup

1st Nové Město II
3rd Nové Město I

UCI XCC World Cup

2nd Nové Město I
2nd Nové Město II

3rd Marathon, National Championships
2021
1st Cross-country, UEC European Championships
UCI XCC World Cup

1st Albstadt
1st Les Gets

2nd Cross-country, National Championships
UCI XCO World Cup

2nd Albstadt
4th Nové Město
4th Les Gets
5th Leogang

French Cup

2nd Lons-le-Saunier

Internazionali d'Italia Series

2nd Nalles

3rd Short track, UCI World Championships
Swiss Bike Cup

3rd Leukerbad

2022
UCI World Championships

1st Cross-country
1st Short track
1st Marathon

National Championships

1st Short track
2nd Cross-country
2nd Marathon

UCI XCO World Cup

1st Val di Sole
4th Lenzerheide

UCI XCC World Cup

1st Petropolis
1st Val di Sole
2nd Albstadt

Ökk Bike Revolution

1st Huttwil

1st Roc d'Azur
2nd Cross-country, UEC European Championships
French Cup

2nd Le Dévoluy

3rd Overall Cape Epic (with Robyn de Groot)
2023
UCI World Championships

1st Cross-country
1st Short track

UCI XCC World Cup

1st Leogang
3rd Lenzerheide
3rd Val di Sole

XCO French Cup

1st Guéret

UCI XCO World Cup

2nd Nové Město
3rd Vallnord
3rd Les Gets
4th Lenzerheide

Ökk Bike Revolution

2nd Chur

2024
1st Cross-country, Olympic Games
1st Short track, UEC European Championships
UCI XCO World Cup

1st Nové Město
1st Val di Sole

Shimano Super Cup

1st La Nucia
1st Banyoles

XCO French Cup

1st Marseille

Ökk Bike Revolution

1st Chur

Swiss Bike Cup

1st Rivera

1st Nals
UCI XCC World Cup

2nd Nové Město
2nd Val di Sole

XCC French Cup

2nd Marseille

==== UCI World Cup results ====
Season	1	2	3	4	5	6	7	8	9	Rank	Points
2012	PIE; 13	HOU; 4	NOV; 20	LAB; 13	MON —	WIN —	ISE —			19	376
2013	ALB; 16	NOV; 11	VAL —	AND —	MON —	HAF —				35	164
2014	PIE —	CAI —	NOV; 1	ALB; 1	MON —	WIN —	MER; 3			10	660
2015	NOV; 3	ALB; DNF	LEN —	MON; 3	WIN; 1	VAL —				10	320
2016	CAI —	ALB; DNF	LAB; 37	LEN; DNF	MON —	AND —				71	32
2017	NOV; 51	ALB; 15	AND; 15	LEN; 19	MON; 2	VAL —				17	437
2018	STE; 2	ALB; 9	NOV; 3	VAL; 4	AND; 11	MON —	LAB; 4			6	882
2019	ALB; 42	NOV; 9	AND; 12	LES; 5	VAL; 1	LEN; 3	SNO; 1			4	1076
2020	LEN; NH	VAL; NH	LES; NH	NOV; 3	NOV; 1					1	475
2021	ALB; 2	NOV; 4	LEO; 5	LES; 4	LEN; DNF	SNO —				6	720
2022	PET; DNF	ALB; 7	NOV; 20	LEO —	LEN; 4	AND; 9	SNO —	MON —	VAL; 1	11	941
2023	NOV; 2	LEN; 4	LEO; 7	VAL; 8	AND; 3	LES; 3	SNO —	MON —		8	1157
2024	MAI —	ARA —	NOV; 1	VAL; 1	CRA —	LES —	PLA —	MON —		25	630

=== Road ===
2009
UEC European Junior Championships

1st Time trial
3rd Road race

National Junior Championships

1st Road race
1st Time trial

UCI World Junior Championships

2nd Road race
2nd Time trial

2010
UCI World Junior Championships

1st Road race
2nd Time trial

National Junior Championships

1st Road race
1st Time trial

UEC European Junior Championships

2nd Road race
2nd Time trial

2011
4th Time trial, National Championships
4th Halle-Buizingen
5th Grand Prix Elsy Jacobs
5th Grand Prix Nicolas Frantz
7th La Flèche Wallonne
9th Trofeo Alfredo Binda
2012 (1 pro win)
1st Time trial, National Championships
1st Time trial, National Under-23 Championships
1st Sprints classification, Holland Ladies Tour
2nd Omloop van het Hageland
5th Omloop Het Nieuwsblad
7th Trofeo Alfredo Binda
7th 7-Dorpenomloop Aalburg
8th Overall Festival Luxembourgeois Elsy Jacobs
8th Road race, Olympic Games
10th Ronde van Drenthe
10th Holland Hills Classic
2013 (1)
1st Time trial, National Championships
1st Time trial, National Under-23 Championships
2nd Team time trial, UCI World Championships
3rd Dwars door de Westhoek
4th Grand Prix Leende
8th Overall La Route de France

1st Young rider classification

2014 (7)
1st Road race, UCI World Championships
National Championships

1st Road race
1st Time trial

National Under-23 Championships

1st Road race
1st Time trial

1st Overall Emakumeen Euskal Bira

1st Stages 1 & 3

1st La Flèche Wallonne
2nd Overall Giro Rosa

1st Young rider classification

3rd GP de Plouay
5th Overall Festival Luxembourgeois Elsy Jacobs

1st Mountains classification
1st Young rider classification

5th Trofeo Alfredo Binda
6th EPZ Omloop van Borsele
2015 (2)
National Championships

1st Road race
3rd Time trial

2nd Trofeo Alfredo Binda
3rd GP de Plouay
5th Overall Festival Luxembourgeois Elsy Jacobs
6th Road race, UCI World Championships
6th Overall Giro Rosa

1st Stage 5

7th Tour of Flanders
8th La Flèche Wallonne
2016
4th Pajot Hills Classic
8th Tour of Flanders
2017
2nd GP de Plouay
8th Amstel Gold Race
2018
6th Trofeo Alfredo Binda
7th Liège–Bastogne–Liège
9th Overall Setmana Ciclista Valenciana
9th Overall The Women's Tour
2021
5th Time trial, National Championships
2025 (4)
1st Overall Tour de France

1st Stages 8 & 9

1st Paris–Roubaix
2nd Tour of Flanders
3rd Strade Bianche
2026
2nd Tour of Flanders
3rd Paris–Roubaix
7th La Flèche Wallonne

=== Awards and honours ===
- Velo magazine – International Cyclist of the year: 2014
- French Sportswoman of the Year: 2014, 2015, 2020

Orders

- Knight of the Legion of Honour: 2024

Sporting positions
Awards and achievements
Preceded by Marion Bartoli	French Sportswoman of the Year; 2014–2015	Succeeded by Émilie Andéol
Preceded by Clarisse Agbegnenou	French Sportswoman of the Year; 2020	Succeeded by Clarisse Agbegnenou
