= 2025 Paris–Roubaix Femmes =

Cycling race

2025 Paris–Roubaix Femmes avec Zwift
2025 UCI Women's World Tour, race 11 of 27
- Official event poster

Race details
- Dates: 12 April 2025
- Stages: 1
- Distance: 148.5 km (92.3 mi)
- Winning time: 3h 40' 07"

Results
	Winner	Pauline Ferrand-Prévot (FRA)	(Visma–Lease a Bike)
	Second	Letizia Borghesi (ITA)	(EF Education–Oatly)
	Third	Lorena Wiebes (NED)	(Team SD Worx–Protime)

The 2025 Paris–Roubaix Femmes (officially Paris–Roubaix Femmes avec Zwift) was a French road cycling one-day race that took place on 12 April. It was the 5th edition of Paris–Roubaix Femmes and the 11th event of the 2025 UCI Women's World Tour.

The race was won by French rider Pauline Ferrand-Prévot of Visma–Lease a Bike, in her first win on the road since 2015, and the first French win at Paris–Roubaix since 1997.

== Route ==
The race used an identical route to the 2024 edition of the race – starting in Denain and finishing on the velodrome in Roubaix after covering 148.5 kilometres (92.3 mi), with 29.2 kilometres (18.1 mi) of cobblestones (or pavé), spread out over 17 sectors – including the famed Carrefour de l'Arbre and the Mons-en-Pévèle – both ranked at "five stars" in difficulty. The women covered the same final 17 sectors as the men's race.

Organisers maintained that they consider it "too dangerous" to include the five-star cobbled sector Trouée d'Arenberg due to its proximity to the start in Denain, having previously noted that they "do not rule out that we will pass through ... in the future".

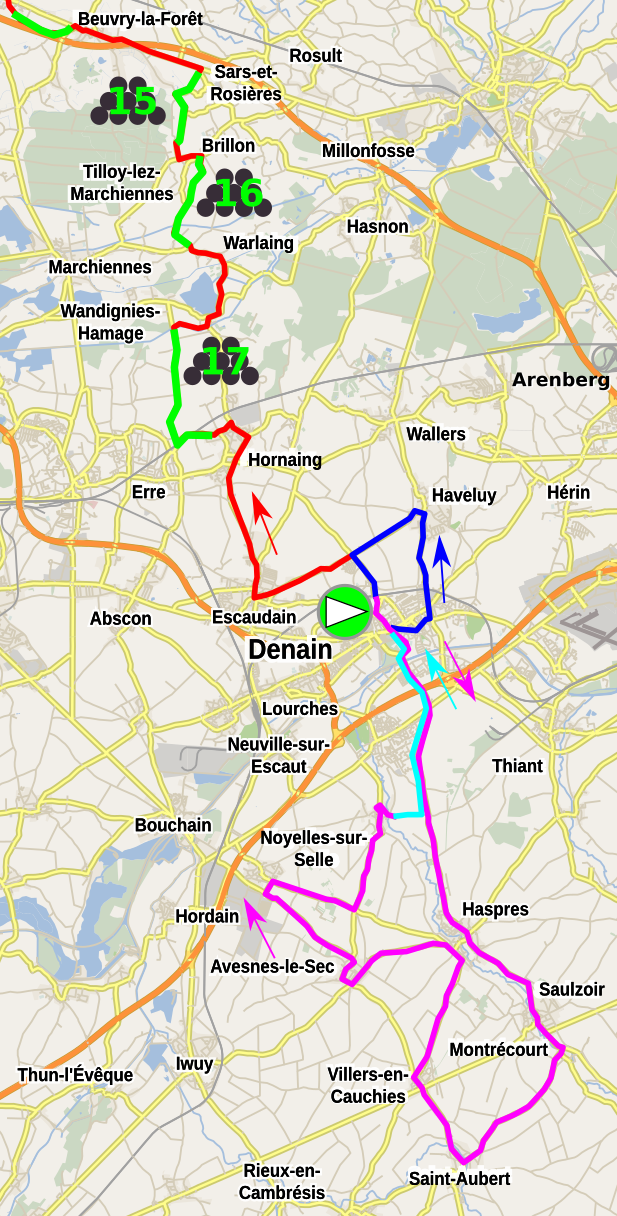
A loop south of the start in Denain before heading north

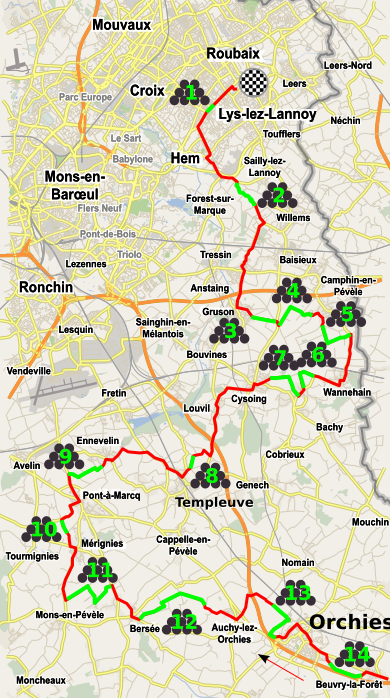
Route from Orchies to finish in Roubaix, similar to previous editions

== Teams ==
23 teams took part in the race. 14 Women's WorldTeams were joined by six UCI Women's ProTeams and three Women's continental teams. The two best 2024 UCI Women's Continental Teams (EF Education–Oatly and VolkerWessels Women Cyclingteam) received an automatic invitation, and the other seven teams were selected by Amaury Sport Organisation (ASO), the organisers of the race.

UCI Women's WorldTeams

- AG Insurance–Soudal
- Canyon//SRAM Zondacrypto
- Ceratizit Pro Cycling
- FDJ–Suez
- Fenix–Deceuninck
- Human Powered Health
- Lidl–Trek
- Liv AlUla Jayco
- Movistar Team
- Team Picnic–PostNL
- Team SD Worx–Protime
- UAE Team ADQ
- Uno-X Mobility
- Visma–Lease a Bike

UCI Women's ProTeams

- Arkéa–B&B Hotels Women
- Cofidis
- EF Education–Oatly
- St. Michel–Preference Home–Auber93
- VolkerWessels Cycling Team
- Winspace Orange Seal

UCI Women's Continental Teams

- Team Coop–Repsol
- Lotto Ladies
- DD Group Pro Cycling Team

== Race summary ==
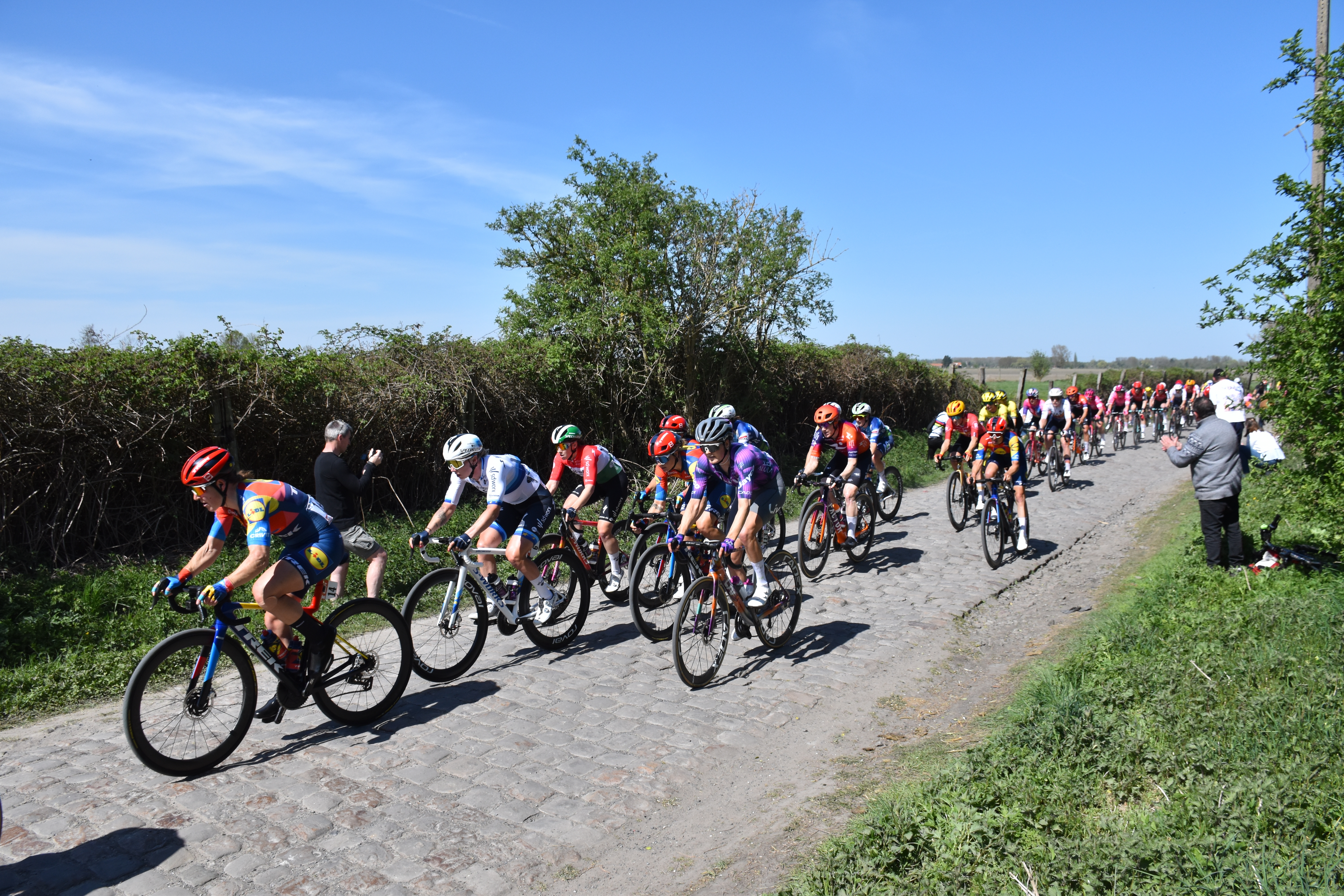
Peloton on the Hornaing sector of pavé

Prior to the race, Lotte Kopecky (Team SD Worx–Protime) was considered favourite for victory, following her win at the 2024 edition of the race and her recent victory at the Tour of Flanders. Other contenders included Kopecky's teammate Lorena Wiebes, Visma–Lease a Bike riders Marianne Vos and Pauline Ferrand-Prévot, Lidl–Trek riders Ellen van Dijk and Elisa Balsamo, and mountain bike world champion Puck Pieterse (Fenix–Deceuninck). In the week prior to the race, Ferrand-Prévot was suffering from an infection in her ankle following a crash at Strade Bianche Donne earlier in the year, and she considered not participating.

In the race, Lidl–Trek pushed the pace as the peloton passed through the first few sectors of pavé, with crashes and punctures occurring behind. With around 72 kilometres remaining, van Dijk attacked and caught the breakaway – before taking a lead of around 20 seconds. With around 55 kilometres remaining, Ferrand-Prévot crashed on a sharp corner in the Auchy-lez-Orchies à Bersée sector of pavé, with four other riders also crashing. Amid the confusion, Kopecky and Wiebes attacked to bridge to van Dijk, with Vos following them to make a strong group of four contenders.

As a few more riders joined the group of contenders, others fell behind – with van Dijk dropped on the five-star Mons-en-Pévèle sector of pavé. Ferrand-Prévot had not been injured, and was chasing back around 30 seconds behind. Kopecky and Vos successfully attacked twice from the group of contenders, however they were brought back. Some riders were unwilling to work with favourites Kopecky and Wiebes, and the group containing Ferrand-Prévot then rejoined – making a larger group of around 20 riders. With around 32 kilometres remaining, Emma Norsgaard (Lidl–Trek) attacked off the front, quickly building a lead of 35 seconds. The group behind gave chase, led by Kopecky – however Ferrand-Prévot then attacked with 25 kilometres remaining. After bridging to Norsgaard, Ferrand-Prévot then attacked on the Camphin-en-Pévèle sector of pavé to go solo with around 15 kilometres remaining.

Ferrand-Prévot rapidly pulled out a gap of 45 seconds, with her teammate Vos discouraging a chase from the group behind. Ferrand-Prévot had time to celebrate her victory in the Roubaix Velodrome, taking her first win on the road since 2015, and becoming the first Frenchwoman to win Paris–Roubaix Femmes. Behind her, Noorsgaard was caught by the chasing group with one sector of pavé remaining. An attack in the final kilometre then allowed Letizia Borghesi (EF Education–Oatly) to take second place, with Wiebes outsprinting Vos to take third place. Noosgaard eventually finished 14th.

Following the race, Ferrand-Prévot expressed that her main goal was to win the 2025 Tour de France Femmes, and that she had been riding for Vos owing to her illness. Both Lidl–Trek and Team SD Worx–Protime expressed disappointment following the race, with Noorsgaard stating that the race is "so, so hard" and "I just want to cry". French media praised Ferrand-Prévot, with L'Équipe calling the victory "among the most beautiful in French women's cycling in the 21st century", and Le Monde noting the last French win at Paris–Roubaix had been Frédéric Guesdon in 1997.

== Result ==
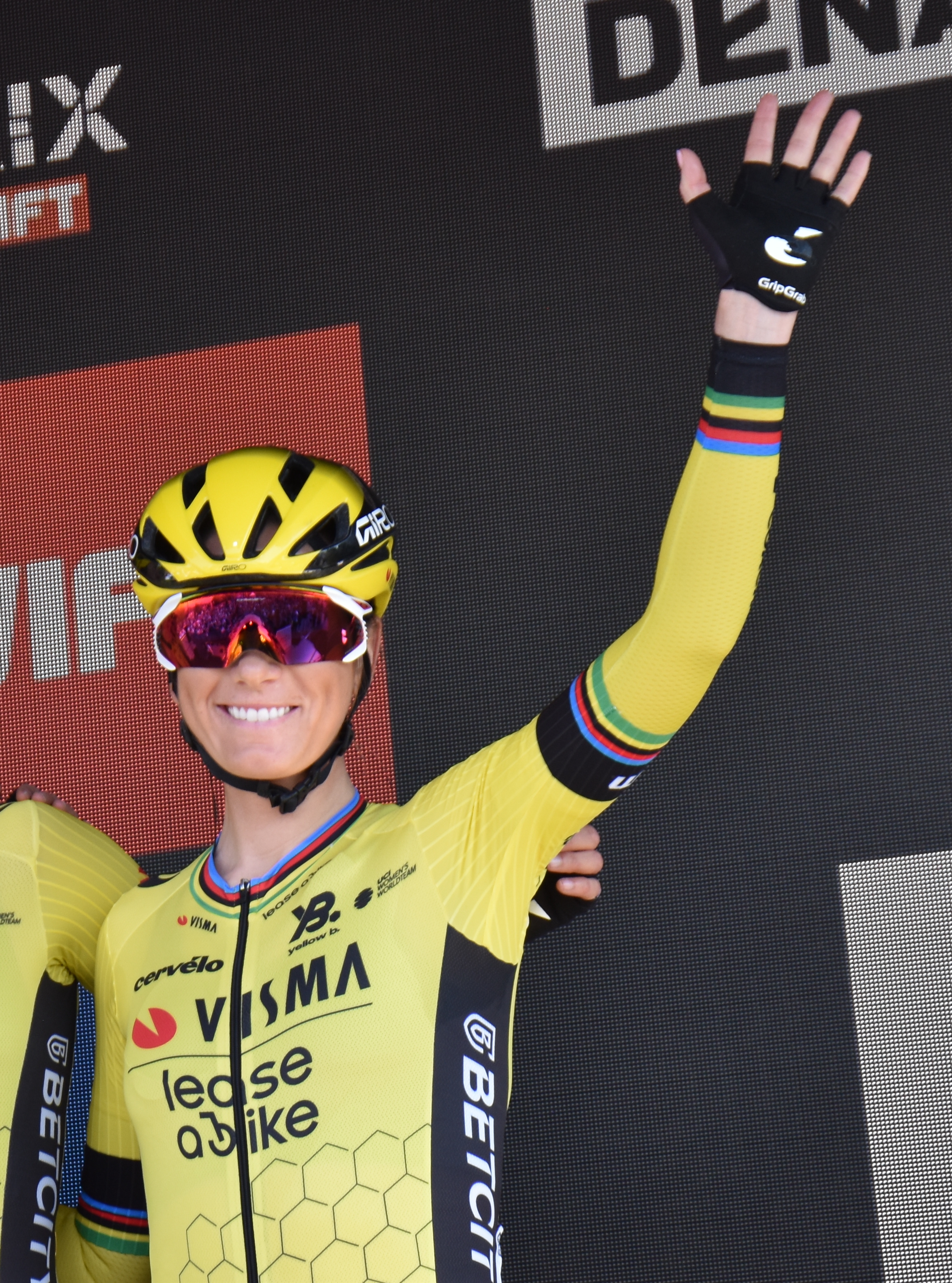
Winner Pauline Ferrand-Prévot of Visma–Lease a Bike, pictured before the start of the race

Result
Rank	Rider	Team	Time
1	Pauline Ferrand-Prévot (FRA)	Visma–Lease a Bike	3h 40' 07"
2	Letizia Borghesi (ITA)	EF Education–Oatly	+ 58"
3	Lorena Wiebes (NED)	Team SD Worx–Protime	+ 1' 01"
4	Marianne Vos (NED)	Visma–Lease a Bike	+ 1' 01"
5	Alison Jackson (CAN)	EF Education–Oatly	+ 1' 01"
6	Maria Giulia Confalonieri (ITA)	Uno-X Mobility	+ 1' 01"
7	Elise Chabbey (SUI)	FDJ–Suez	+ 1' 04"
8	Chloe Dygert (USA)	Canyon//SRAM Zondacrypto	+ 1' 06"
9	Elisa Balsamo (ITA)	Lidl–Trek	+ 1' 21"
10	Chiara Consonni (ITA)	Canyon//SRAM Zondacrypto	+ 1' 21"
