= 2014 Festival Luxembourgeois du cyclisme féminin Elsy Jacobs =

- Logo of the event

Race details
- Dates: 2–4 May
- Stages: 3
- Distance: 204.29 km (126.94 mi)
- Winning time: 5h 16' 48"

Results
| Jersey awarded to the overall winner | Winner | Anna van der Breggen (NED) | (Rabobank-Liv Woman Cycling Team) |
| | Second | Marianne Vos (NED) | (Rabobank-Liv Woman Cycling Team) |
| | Third | Shelley Olds (USA) | (Alé Cipollini) |
| Jersey awarded to the points classification winner | Points | Marianne Vos (NED) | (Rabobank-Liv Woman Cycling Team) |
| Jersey awarded to the mountains classification winner | Mountains | Pauline Ferrand-Prévot (FRA) | (Rabobank-Liv Woman Cycling Team) |
| Jersey awarded to the young rider classification winner | Young rider | Pauline Ferrand-Prévot (FRA) | (Rabobank-Liv Woman Cycling Team) |

The 2014 Festival Luxembourgeois du cyclisme féminin Elsy Jacobs was the seventh edition of a women's road racing event in Luxembourg. It was a stage race with a UCI rating of 2.1. It was the eighth stage race of the 2014 Women's Elite cycling calendar, and was the only race in Luxembourg, apart from the National Championships, on this calendar.

Rabobank-Liv Woman Cycling Team achieved a clean sweep of all three stage wins and all four jerseys.

== Teams ==
Twenty teams competed in the 2014 Festival Luxembourgeois du cyclisme féminin Elsy Jacobs. These included seventeen UCI Women's Teams, two national teams and one non-UCI team.

UCI teams

- (Italy) Alé Cipollini
- (Italy) Astana BePink
- (Netherlands) Boels–Dolmans
- (Russia) RusVelo
- (Belgium) Lotto–Belisol Ladies
- (Netherlands) Rabobank-Liv Woman Cycling Team
- (Netherlands) Team Giant–Shimano
- (Netherlands) Futurumshop.nl–Zannata
- (United Kingdom) Wiggle–Honda
- (Denmark) Top Girls Fassa Bortolo
- (Italy) Vaiano Fondriest
- (Denmark) Hitec Products
- (Switzerland) Bigla Cycling Team
- (Australia) Orica–AIS
- (Spain) Lointek
- (Sweden) Firefighters Upsala CK
- (France) Poitou–Charentes.Futuroscope.86

National teams

- (Spain)
- Canada

Non-UCI teams

- (Belgium) Wielerclub De Sprinters Malderen

== Stages ==
=== Prologue ===
2 May 2014 – Cessange, 2.59 km (1.6 mi), individual time trial (ITT)

Prologue Result and General Classification after Prologue

| | Rider | Team | Time |
|---|---|---|---|
| 1 | Marianne Vos (NED) | Rabobank-Liv Woman Cycling Team | 3' 12" |
| 2 | Ellen van Dijk (NED) | Boels–Dolmans | + 2" |
| 3 | Shelley Olds (USA) | Alé Cipollini | + 3" |
| 4 | Lizzie Armitstead (GBR) | Boels–Dolmans | + 3" |
| 5 | Anna van der Breggen (NED) | Rabobank-Liv Woman Cycling Team | + 4" |
| 6 | Pauline Ferrand-Prévot (FRA) | Rabobank-Liv Woman Cycling Team | + 4" |
| 7 | Thalita de Jong (NED) | Rabobank-Liv Woman Cycling Team | + 4" |
| 8 | Melissa Hoskins (AUS) | Orica–AIS | + 5" |
| 9 | Amy Pieters (NED) | Team Giant–Shimano | + 6" |
| 10 | Megan Guarnier (USA) | Boels–Dolmans | + 6" |

=== Stage 1 ===
3 May 2014 – Garnich to Garnich, 102.6 km (63.8 mi)

Stage 1 result

| | Rider | Team | Time |
|---|---|---|---|
| 1 | Anna van der Breggen (NED) | Rabobank-Liv Woman Cycling Team | 2h 41' 42" |
| 2 | Shelley Olds (USA) | Alé Cipollini | + 1' 11" |
| 3 | Giorgia Bronzini (ITA) | Wiggle–Honda | + 1' 11" |
| 4 | Marianne Vos (NED) | Rabobank-Liv Woman Cycling Team | + 1' 11" |
| 5 | Thalita de Jong (NED) | Rabobank-Liv Woman Cycling Team | + 1' 11" |
| 6 | Amy Pieters (NED) | Team Giant–Shimano | + 1' 11" |
| 7 | Pauline Ferrand-Prévot (FRA) | Rabobank-Liv Woman Cycling Team | + 1' 11" |
| 8 | Emma Johansson (SWE) | Orica–AIS | + 1' 11" |
| 9 | Inga Čilvinaitė (LTU) | RusVelo | + 1' 11" |
| 10 | Ashleigh Moolman (RSA) | Hitec Products | + 1' 11" |

General Classification after Stage 1

| | Rider | Team | Time |
|---|---|---|---|
| 1 | Anna van der Breggen (NED) | Rabobank-Liv Woman Cycling Team | 2h 44' 48" |
| 2 | Shelley Olds (USA) | Alé Cipollini | + 1' 14" |
| 3 | Marianne Vos (NED) | Rabobank-Liv Woman Cycling Team | + 1' 17" |
| 4 | Ellen van Dijk (NED) | Boels–Dolmans | + 1' 19" |
| 5 | Pauline Ferrand-Prévot (FRA) | Rabobank-Liv Woman Cycling Team | + 1' 21" |
| 6 | Thalita de Jong (NED) | Rabobank-Liv Woman Cycling Team | + 1' 21" |
| 7 | Amy Pieters (NED) | Team Giant–Shimano | + 1' 23" |
| 8 | Megan Guarnier (USA) | Boels–Dolmans | + 1' 23" |
| 9 | Elke Gebhardt (GER) | Bigla Cycling Team | + 1' 24" |
| 10 | Lucinda Brand (NED) | Rabobank-Liv Woman Cycling Team | + 1' 26" |

=== Stage 2 ===
4 May 2014 – Mamer to Mamer, 99.1 km (61.6 mi)

Stage 2 result

| | Rider | Team | Time |
|---|---|---|---|
| 1 | Marianne Vos (NED) | Rabobank-Liv Woman Cycling Team | 2h 31' 58" |
| 2 | Emma Johansson (SWE) | Orica–AIS | + 2" |
| 3 | Julie Leth (DEN) | Hitec Products | + 2" |
| 4 | Giorgia Bronzini (ITA) | Wiggle–Honda | + 2" |
| 5 | Shelley Olds (USA) | Alé Cipollini | + 2" |
| 6 | Aude Biannic (FRA) | Lointek | + 2" |
| 7 | Ellen van Dijk (NED) | Boels–Dolmans | + 2" |
| 8 | Barbara Guarischi (ITA) | Alé Cipollini | + 2" |
| 9 | Elisa Longo Borghini (ITA) | Hitec Products | + 2" |
| 10 | Christine Majerus (LUX) | Boels–Dolmans | + 2" |

Final General Classification

| | Rider | Team | Time |
|---|---|---|---|
| 1 | Anna van der Breggen (NED) | Rabobank-Liv Woman Cycling Team | 5h 16' 48" |
| 2 | Marianne Vos (NED) | Rabobank-Liv Woman Cycling Team | + 1' 05" |
| 3 | Shelley Olds (USA) | Alé Cipollini | + 1' 14" |
| 4 | Ellen van Dijk (NED) | Boels–Dolmans | + 1' 19" |
| 5 | Pauline Ferrand-Prévot (FRA) | Rabobank-Liv Woman Cycling Team | + 1' 21" |
| 6 | Thalita de Jong (NED) | Rabobank-Liv Woman Cycling Team | + 1' 21" |
| 7 | Emma Johansson (SWE) | Orica–AIS | + 1' 22" |
| 8 | Amy Pieters (NED) | Team Giant–Shimano | + 1' 23" |
| 9 | Megan Guarnier (USA) | Boels–Dolmans | + 1' 23" |
| 10 | Elke Gebhardt (GER) | Bigla Cycling Team | + 1' 24" |

== Classification leadership ==
| Stage | Winner | General classification | Points classification | Mountains classification | Young rider classification |
|---|---|---|---|---|---|
| P | Marianne Vos | Marianne Vos | Marianne Vos | not awarded | Pauline Ferrand-Prévot |
| 1 | Anna van der Breggen | Anna van der Breggen | Marianne Vos | Pauline Ferrand-Prévot | Pauline Ferrand-Prévot |
| 2 | Marianne Vos | Anna van der Breggen | Marianne Vos | Pauline Ferrand-Prévot | Pauline Ferrand-Prévot |
| Final Classification | | Anna van der Breggen | Marianne Vos | Pauline Ferrand-Prévot | Pauline Ferrand-Prévot |
