= 2026 Paris–Roubaix Femmes =

Cycling race

2026 Paris–Roubaix Femmes Hauts de France
2026 UCI Women's World Tour, race 12 of 26
- Event poster, featuring 2025 winners Mathieu van der Poel and Pauline Ferrand-Prévot

Race details
- Dates: 12 April 2026
- Stages: 1
- Distance: 143.1 km (88.9 mi)
- Winning time: 3h 30' 16"

Results
	Winner	Franziska Koch (GER)	(FDJ United–Suez)
	Second	Marianne Vos (NED)	(Visma–Lease a Bike)
	Third	Pauline Ferrand-Prévot (FRA)	(Visma–Lease a Bike)

The 2026 Paris–Roubaix Femmes (officially Paris–Roubaix Femmes Hauts de France) was a French road cycling one-day race that took place on 12 April. It was the 6th edition of Paris–Roubaix Femmes and the 12th event of the 2026 UCI Women's World Tour.

In December 2025, the organisers of the race Amaury Sport Organisation (ASO) announced that the race would be held on the same day as the men's race from 2026, owing to the cost of security and to increase visibility of the women's race. This resulted in the race having a reduced television broadcast compared to previous editions, which was criticised in the media and by the riders union Cyclists' Alliance. In early 2026, ASO announced that both the men's and women's races would be sponsored by the Hauts-de-France region, taking the name as a subtitle.

The race was won by German rider Franziska Koch of FDJ United–Suez, beating Marianne Vos of Visma–Lease a Bike in a sprint finish, after Koch, Vos and 2025 winner Pauline Ferrand-Prévot escaped the peloton with around 40 kilometres (25 mi) to go. Ferrand-Prévot finished third, six seconds behind. It was Koch's first victory in the UCI Women's World Tour.

== Route ==
The race started in Denain and finished on the velodrome in Roubaix after covering 143.1 kilometres (88.9 mi), with 33.7 kilometres (20.9 mi) of cobblestones (or pavé), spread out over 20 sectors – including the famed Carrefour de l'Arbre and the Mons-en-Pévèle – both ranked at "five stars" in difficulty. Although the route was 5 kilometres (3.1 mi) shorter than the 2024 and 2025 editions, the loops around Denain were replaced by a route that initially heads south before the inclusion of three additional cobblestone sectors, adding 4.5 kilometres (2.8 mi) of cobblestones to the route – including the Haveluy à Wallers sector ranked as "four star" difficulty.

== Teams ==
21 teams took part in the race. 14 Women's WorldTeams were joined by seven UCI Women's ProTeams.

UCI Women's WorldTeams

- AG Insurance–Soudal
- Canyon//SRAM Zondacrypto
- EF Education–Oatly
- FDJ United–Suez
- Fenix–Premier Tech
- Human Powered Health
- Lidl–Trek
- Liv AlUla Jayco
- Movistar Team
- Team Picnic–PostNL
- Team SD Worx–Protime
- UAE Team ADQ
- Uno-X Mobility
- Visma–Lease a Bike

UCI Women's ProTeams

- Cofidis
- Laboral Kutxa–Fundación Euskadi
- Lotto–Intermarché Ladies
- Ma Petite Entreprise
- Mayenne Monbana My Pie
- St. Michel–Preference Home–Auber93
- VolkerWessels Cycling Team

== Result ==
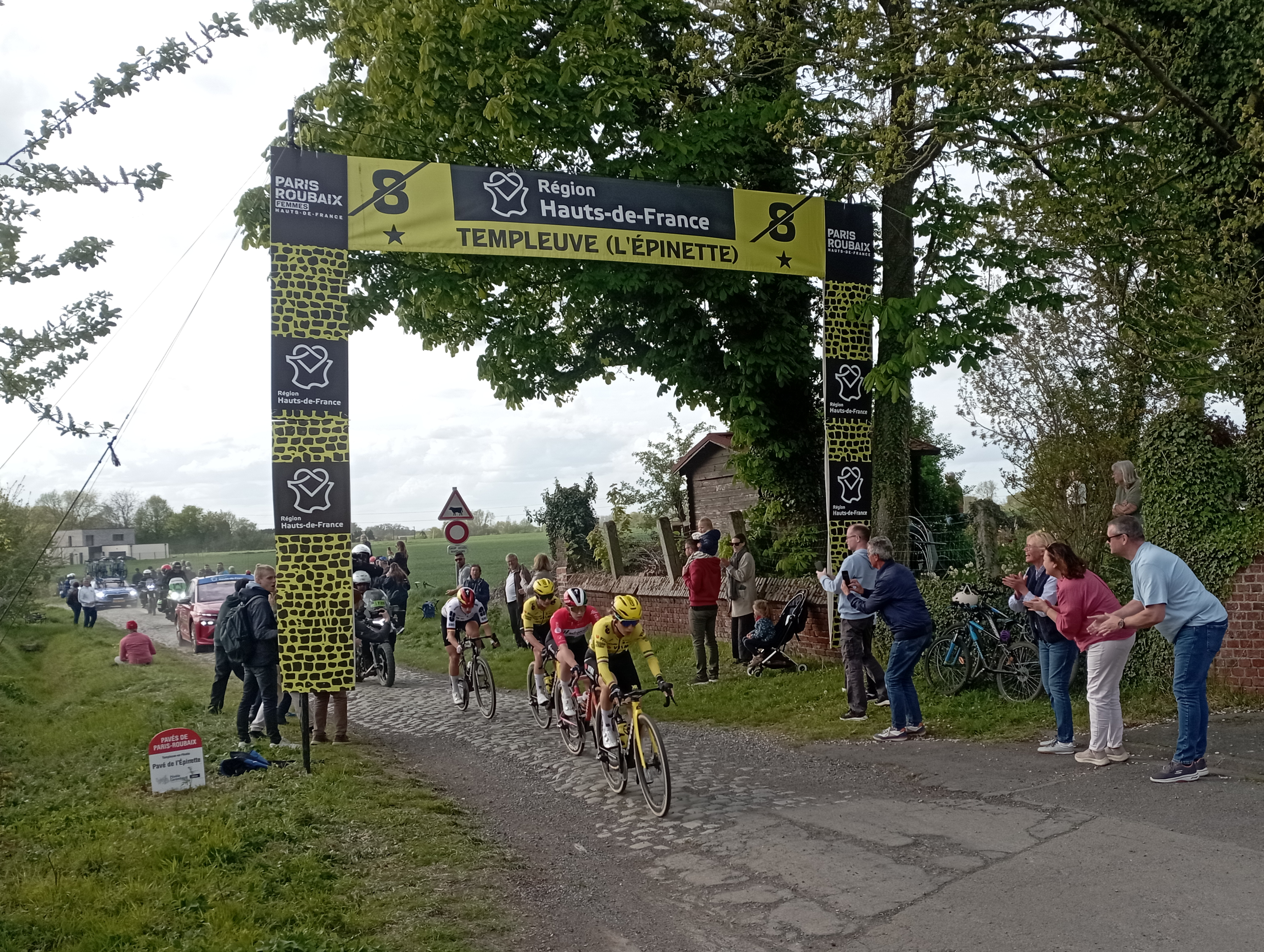
Front of the race at the end of sector 8, Visma–Lease a Bike teammates Marianne Vos and Pauline Ferrand-Prévot, Blanka Vas (Team SD Worx–Protime), and eventual winner Franziska Koch (FDJ United–Suez)

Result
Rank	Rider	Team	Time
1	Franziska Koch (GER)	FDJ United–Suez	3h 30' 16"
2	Marianne Vos (NED)	Visma–Lease a Bike	+ 0"
3	Pauline Ferrand-Prévot (FRA)	Visma–Lease a Bike	+ 6"
4	Lotte Kopecky (BEL)	Team SD Worx–Protime	+ 1' 30"
5	Megan Jastrab (USA)	UAE Team ADQ	+ 1' 30"
6	Lorena Wiebes (NED)	Team SD Worx–Protime	+ 2' 20"
7	Charlotte Kool (NED)	Fenix–Premier Tech	+ 2' 20"
8	Lara Gillespie (IRE)	UAE Team ADQ	+ 2' 20"
9	Arlenis Sierra (CUB)	Movistar Team	+ 2' 20"
10	Lucinda Brand (NED)	Lidl–Trek	+ 2' 20"
