= 2016 Pajot Hills Classic =

Race details
- Dates: 30 March 2016
- Stages: 1
- Distance: 122.4 km (76.1 mi)
- Winning time: 3h 08' 14"

Results
	Winner	Marianne Vos (NED)	(Rabobank-Liv Woman Cycling Team)
	Second	Megan Guarnier (USA)	(Boels–Dolmans)
	Third	Lotta Lepistö (FIN)	(Cervélo–Bigla Pro Cycling)

The 2016 Pajot Hills Classic was the first edition of the Pajot Hills Classic, a women's bicycle race in Belgium. It was held on 30 March 2016 over a distance of 122.4 kilometres (76.1 miles) starting and finishing in Gooik. It was rated by the UCI as a 1.2 category race.

== Race ==
In the first part of the race the American Alison Tetrick (Cylance) went solo in the breakaway. She was caught and between the Muur van Geraardsbergen and the Bosberg the peloton split in several parts with a front group of about forty riders. With less than 20 km to go the Polish Katarzyna Niewiadoma (Rabo Liv) escaped and a bit later Ellen van Dijk (Boels–Dolmans), Anna van der Breggen (Rabo Liv), Megan Guarnier (Boels–Dolmans) and Elisa Longo Borghini (Wiggle High5) joined her. They got a gap but on the last cobble stones section, with about 5 km to go the group was caught. In a sprint uphill Vos was the fastest ahead of Guarnier and the Finnish champion Lotta Lepisto (Cervelo Bigla).

== Result ==
Result
Rank	Rider	Team	Time
1	Marianne Vos (NED)	Rabobank-Liv Woman Cycling Team	3:08:14
2	Megan Guarnier (USA)	Boels–Dolmans	+ 0"
3	Lotta Lepistö (FIN)	Cervélo–Bigla Pro Cycling	+ 0"
4	Pauline Ferrand-Prévot (FRA)	Rabobank-Liv Woman Cycling Team	+ 0"
5	Jolien D'Hoore (BEL)	Wiggle High5	+ 0"
6	Lauren Kitchen (AUS)	Team Hitec Products	+ 0"
7	Maria Giulia Confalonieri (ITA)	Lensworld–Zannata	+ 0"
8	Ashleigh Moolman-Pasio (RSA)	Cervélo–Bigla Pro Cycling	+ 0"
9	Sofie De Vuyst (BEL)	Lotto–Soudal Ladies	+ 0"
10	Camilla Møllebro (DEN)	Team BMS BIRN	+ 0"

== See also ==
- 2016 in women's road cycling
