= 2012 Holland Ladies Tour =

2012 BrainWash Ladies Tour
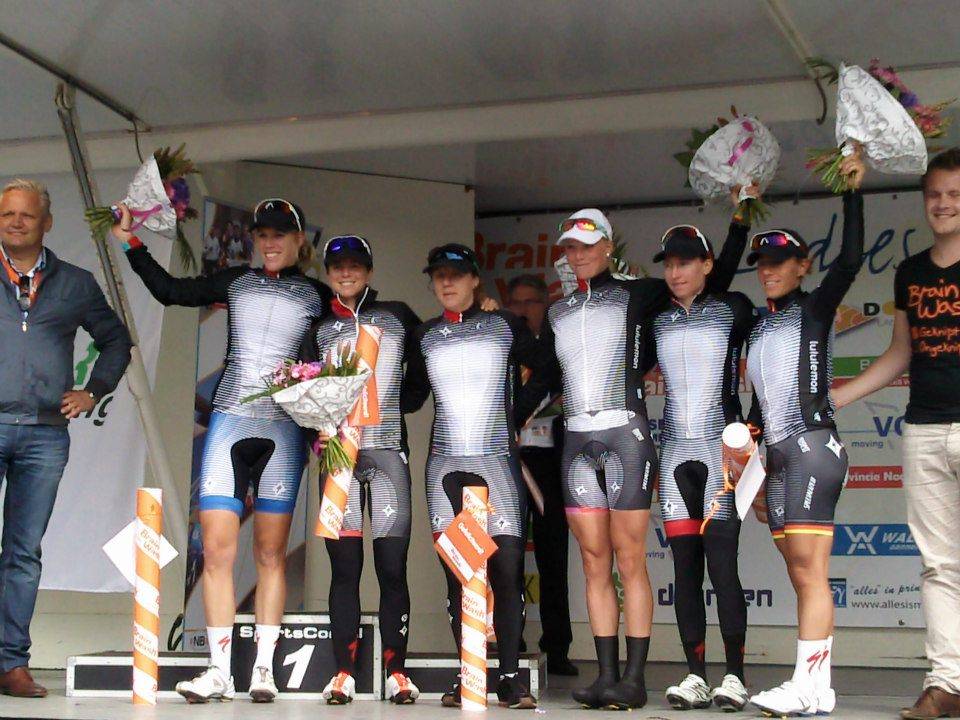
- Team Specialized–lululemon after winning the 2nd stage

Race details
- Dates: September 4 – September 9
- Stages: 6
- Distance: 601.2 km (373.6 mi)
- Winning time: 14:53.09

Results
Jersey awarded to the overall winner	Winner	Marianne Vos (NED)	(Rabo Women Cycling Team)
	Second	Evelyn Stevens (USA)	(Specialized – Lululemon)
	Third	Judith Arndt (GER)	(Orica Greenedge)
	Youth	Elisa Longo Borghini (ITA)	(Hitec Products – Mistral)
	Combination	Marianne Vos (NED)	(Rabo Women Cycling Team)

The 15th edition of the annual Holland Ladies Tour was held from September 4 to September 9, 2012. The women's stage race with an UCI rating of 2.2 started in Neerijnen, and ended in Berg en Terblijt.

The Holland Ladies Tour 2012 had financial problems due to sponsoring problems. Their sponsor quit and it was unsure if the Tour would be organized in 2012. The organization initially decided to organize the tour without a new sponsor, before signing a sponsorship contract with Dutch hairdressing salon chain BrainWash and renaming the 15th edition of the race the BrainWash Ladies Tour.

== Stages ==
=== 2012-09-04 Neerijnen — Neerijnen (108.2 km) ===
Place	Stage 1		General Classification	
Place	Name	Time	Name	Time
1.	Ina Yoko Teutenberg (GER)	2:49.19	Marianne Vos (NED)	2:49:07
2.	Marianne Vos (NED)	s.t.	Ina Yoko Teutenberg (GER)	2:49.09
3.	Georgia Bronzini (ITA)	s.t.	Georgia Bronzini (ITA)	2:49.15

=== 2012-09-05 Dronten — Dronten (Team Time Trial) (33.8 km) ===
Place	Stage 2		General Classification	
Place	Name	Time	Name	Time
1.	Team Specialized–lululemon; Ellen van Dijk (NED); Trixi Worrack (GER); Ina Yoko Teutenberg (GER); Evelyn Stevens (USA); Amber Neben (USA); Charlotte Becker (GER)	41:04.77	Trixi Worrack (GER)	3:30:23
2.	Orica–AIS; Judith Arndt (GER); Shara Gillow (AUS); Loes Gunnewijk (NED); Melissa Hoskins (AUS); Alexis Rhodes (AUS); Linda Villumsen (NZL)	+19.01	Ellen van Dijk (NED)	s.t.
3.	Rabobank Women Cycling Team; Iris Slappendel (NED); Liesbet De Vocht (BEL); Pauline Ferrand-Prévot (FRA); Tatiana Antoshina (RUS); Annemiek van Vleuten (NED); Marianne Vos (NED)	+57.80	Charlotte Becker (GER)	s.t.

=== 2012-09-06 Leerdam — Leerdam (122.2 km) ===
Place	Stage 3		General Classification	
Place	Name	Time	Name	Time
1.	Kirsten Wild (NED)	2:49.41	Charlotte Becker (GER)	6:20.03
2.	Marianne Vos (NED)	s.t.	Trixi Worrack (GER)	6:20.04
3.	Emma Johansson (SWE)	s.t.	Ellen van Dijk (NED)	s.t.

=== 2012-09-07 Zaltbommel — Zaltbommel (122.4 km) ===
Place	Stage 4		General Classification	
Place	Name	Time	Name	Time
1.	Marianne Vos (NED)	2:57.43	Charlotte Becker (GER)	9:17.40
2.	Charlotte Becker (GER)	s.t.	Marianne Vos (NED)	9:18.06
3.	Emma Johansson (SWE)	s.t.	Ellen van Dijk (NED)	9:19.15

=== 2012-09-08 Bergeijk — Bergeijk (126.7 km) ===
Place	Stage 5		General Classification	
Place	Name	Time	Name	Time
1.	Ina Yoko Teutenberg (GER)	3:03.03	Charlotte Becker (GER)	12:21.22
2.	Shelley Olds (USA)	s.t.	Marianne Vos (NED)	12:21.46
3.	Sara Mustonen (SWE)	s.t.	Ellen van Dijk (NED)	12:22.57

=== 2012-09-09 Bunde — Berg en Terblijt (87.9 km) ===
Place	Stage 6		General Classification	
Place	Name	Time	Name	Time
1.	Marianne Vos (NED)	2:31.39	Marianne Vos (NED)	14:53.09
2.	Evelyn Stevens (USA)	s.t.	Evelyn Stevens (USA)	14:54.30
3.	Elisa Longo Borghini (ITA)	2:31.48	Judith Arndt (GER)	14:55.59

== Final standings ==
=== General Classification ===
RANK	NAME	TEAM	TIME
1.	Marianne Vos (NED)	Rabobank Women Cycling Team	14:53.09
2.	Evelyn Stevens (USA)	Specialized – Lululemon	+1.21
3.	Judith Arndt (GER)	Orica–AIS	+2.50
4.	Trixi Worrack (GER)	Specialized – Lululemon	+3.26
5.	Emma Johansson (SWE)	Hitec Products – Mistral	+4.51
6.	Elisa Longo Borghini (ITA)	Hitec Products – Mistral	+5.21
7.	Anna van der Breggen (NED)	Sengers Ladies Cycling Team	+5.57
8.	Linda Villumsen (NZL)	Rabobank Women Cycling Team	+6.45
9.	Jessie Daams (BEL)	AA-Drink – Leontien.nl	+7.31
10.	Giorgia Bronzini (ITA)	Italian National Team	+8.20

=== Best Young Rider Classification ===
RANK	NAME	TEAM	TIME
1.	Elisa Longo Borghini (ITA)	Hitec Products – Mistral	14:58.30
2.	Anna van der Breggen (NED)	Sengers Ladies CT	14:59.06
3.	Jessie Daams (BEL)	AA-Drink – Leontien.nl	15:00.40

=== Combination Classification ===
RANK	NAME	TEAM	POINTS
1.	Marianne Vos (NED)	Rabobank Women Cycling Team	30
2.	Judith Arndt (GER)	Orica–AIS	17
3.	Evelyn Stevens (USA)	Specialized – Lululemon	16
