= 2025 Tour of Flanders (women's race) =

Cycling race

2025 Ronde van Vlaanderen Elite Vrouwen
2025 UCI Women's World Tour, race 10 of 27
- Event poster with previous winners Mathieu van der Poel and Elisa Longo Borghini

Race details
- Dates: 6 April 2025
- Stages: 1
- Distance: 168.9 km (104.9 mi)
- Winning time: 4h 24' 34"

Results
	Winner	Lotte Kopecky (BEL)	(Team SD Worx–Protime)
	Second	Pauline Ferrand-Prévot (FRA)	(Visma–Lease a Bike)
	Third	Liane Lippert (GER)	(Movistar Team)

The 2025 Ronde van Vlaanderen was a Belgian road cycling one-day race that took place on 6 April. It was the 22nd edition of the Tour of Flanders for Women and the 10th event of the 2025 UCI Women's World Tour. The race was won by Belgian rider Lotte Kopecky of Team SD Worx–Protime. It was Kopecky's third victory at the race, setting a record for the most wins by a female rider.

== Teams ==
Fourteen UCI Women's WorldTeams, four UCI Women's ProTeams, and six UCI Women's Continental Teams took part in the race.

UCI Women's WorldTeams

- AG Insurance–Soudal
- Canyon//SRAM Zondacrypto
- Ceratizit Pro Cycling
- FDJ–Suez
- Fenix–Deceuninck
- Human Powered Health
- Lidl–Trek
- Liv AlUla Jayco
- Movistar Team
- Team Picnic–PostNL
- Team SD Worx–Protime
- UAE Team ADQ
- Uno-X Mobility
- Visma–Lease a Bike

UCI Women's ProTeams

- Cofidis
- EF Education–Oatly
- St. Michel–Preference Home–Auber93
- VolkerWessels Cycling Team

UCI Women's Continental Teams

- BePink–Imatra–Bongioanni
- DD Group Pro Cycling Team
- DAS–Hutchinson
- Lotto Ladies
- Team Coop–Repsol

== Result ==
Result
Rank	Rider	Team	Time
1	Lotte Kopecky (BEL)	Team SD Worx–Protime	4h 24' 34"
2	Pauline Ferrand-Prévot (FRA)	Visma–Lease a Bike	+ 0"
3	Liane Lippert (GER)	Movistar Team	+ 0"
4	Katarzyna Niewiadoma (POL)	Canyon//SRAM Zondacrypto	+ 1"
5	Kimberley Le Court (MRI)	AG Insurance–Soudal	+ 1' 13"
6	Letizia Borghesi (ITA)	EF Education–EasyPost	+ 1' 13"
7	Elise Chabbey (SUI)	FDJ–Suez	+ 1' 13"
8	Ellen van Dijk (NED)	Lidl–Trek	+ 1' 13"
9	Puck Pieterse (NED)	Fenix–Deceuninck	+ 1' 13"
10	Marlen Reusser (SUI)	Movistar Team	+ 1' 13"
