= Jim Aernouts =

Belgian cyclist

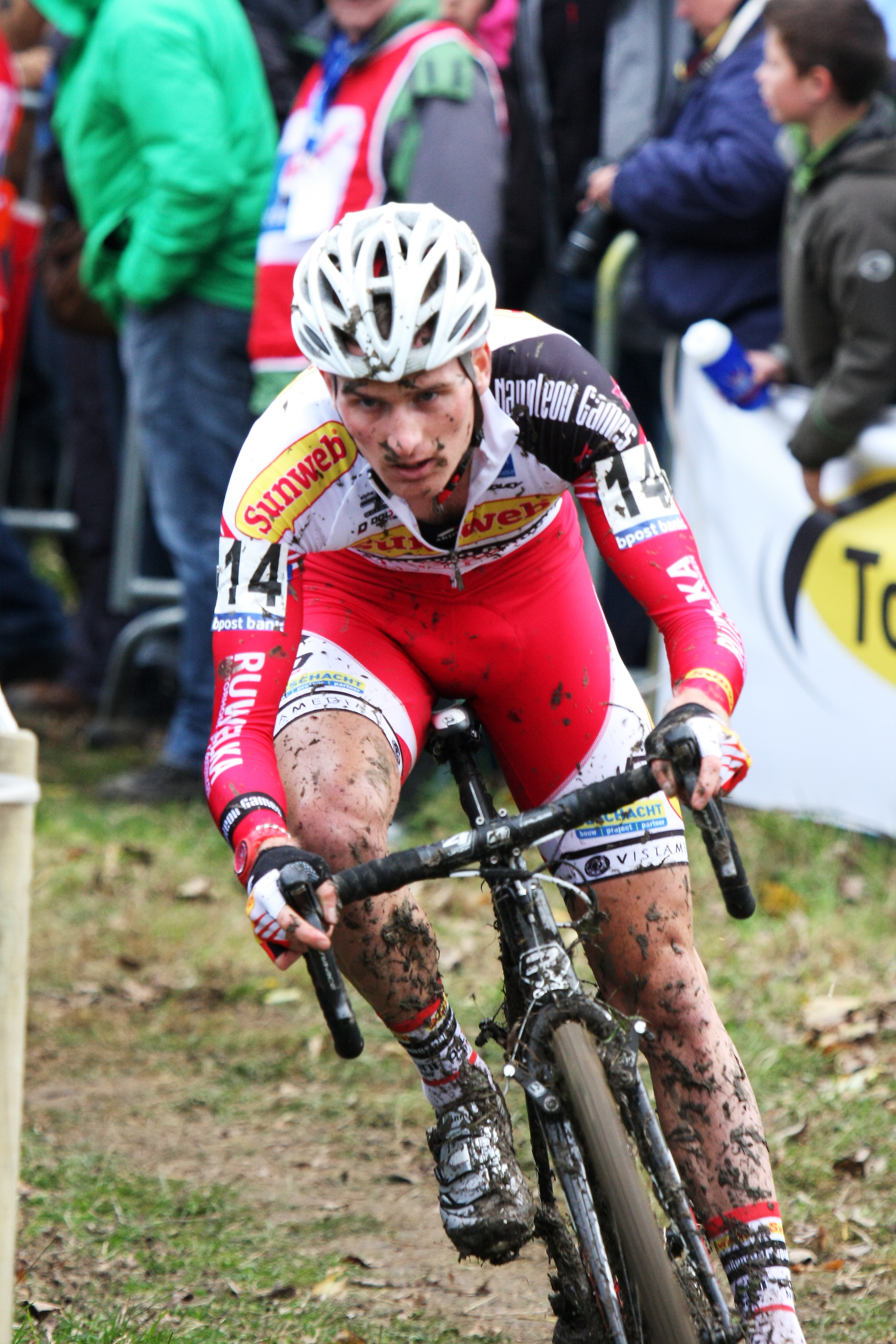
- Aernouts in 2013

Personal information
- Full name: Jim Aernouts
- Born: 23 March 1989 (age 37) Antwerp, Belgium
- Height: 1.77 m (5 ft 10 in)
- Weight: 63 kg (139 lb)

Cycling career
- Sport: Cycling
- Current team: Retired
- Disciplines: Cyclo-cross; Road
- Role: Rider

Professional teams
- 2008: Palmans–Cras
- 2009–2010: BKCP–Powerplus
- 2011–2015: Sunweb–Revor
- 2015–2021: Telenet–Fidea

Jim Aernouts (born 23 March 1989 in Antwerp) is a Belgian former professional cyclist, who rode professionally between 2008 and 2021 for the Palmans–Cras, BKCP–Powerplus, Sunweb–Napoleon Games and Baloise–Trek Lions teams. Following his retirement, Aernouts now works as a maître d'hôtel at a restaurant that he owns with his wife in Essen.

== Major results ==
=== Cyclo-cross ===
2005–2006
Junior Superprestige

2nd Sint-Michielsgestel
3rd Ruddervoorde

UCI Under-23 World Cup

3rd Kalmthout

2006–2007
1st National Junior Championships
Junior Superprestige

1st Gavere
1st Sint-Michielsgestel
1st Ruddervoorde

2008–2009
Under-23 Gazet van Antwerpen

2nd Oostmalle
2nd Essen

UCI Under-23 World Cup

3rd Pijnacker

3rd Niel
2009–2010
1st National Under-23 Championships
UCI Under-23 World Cup

1st Koksijde

Under-23 Gazet van Antwerpen

1st Oostmalle
3rd Hasselt
2nd Essen

2nd Overall Under-23 Superprestige

3rd Vorselaar
3rd Gavere
3rd Ruddervoorde

2010–2011
1st Overall Under-23 Superprestige

1st Ruddervoorde
1st Hamme
1st Middelkerke
2nd Zonhoven
2nd Hoogstraten
3rd Gavere

Under-23 Gazet van Antwerpen

1st Hasselt
1st Lille
2nd Oostmalle
3rd Namur

2011–2012
3rd Harderwijk
2012–2013
1st Contern
BPost Bank Trophy

3rd Oostmalle

2013–2014
1st Nagusia
2nd Rucphen
2014–2015
3rd Brabant
2015–2016
2nd Rucphen
Toi Toi Cup

2nd Slaný

2016–2017
2nd Rucphen
Trek Cup

2nd Waterloo Day 1
2nd Waterloo Day 2

2017–2018
2nd Rucphen
National Trophy Series

3rd Abergavenny

2018–2019
Toi Toi Cup

1st Slaný

2nd Mol
2nd Munich
2019–2020
1st Podbrezová
1st Topoľčianky
3rd Iowa City Race 3

=== Road ===
2015
9th Overall Course de la Solidarité Olympique
