= Jens Adams =

Belgian cyclist (born 1992)

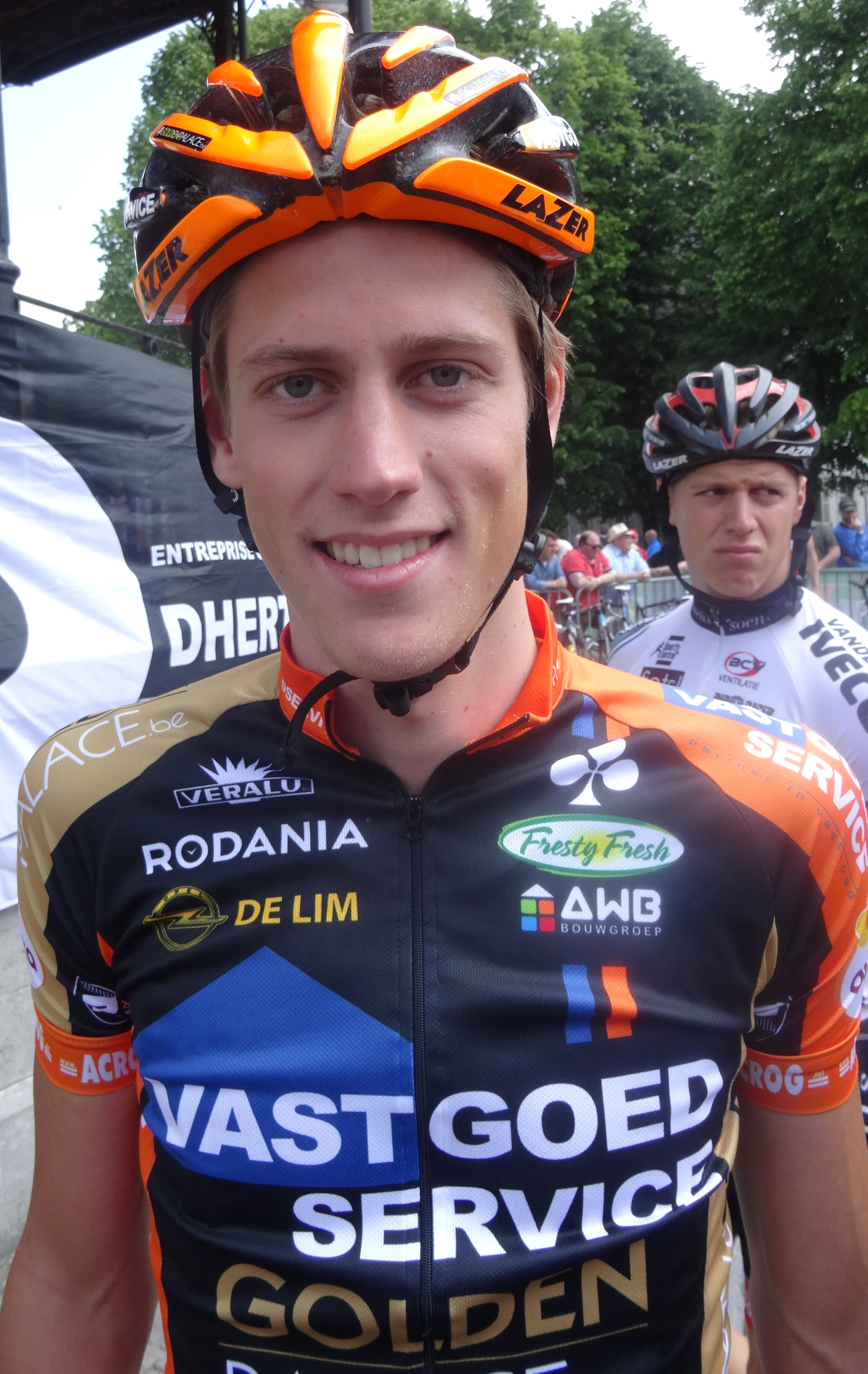

Personal information
- Born: 5 June 1992 (age 34) Turnhout, Belgium
- Height: 1.82 m (6 ft 0 in)
- Weight: 66 kg (146 lb)

Cycling career
- Sport: Cycling
- Current team: Athletes for Hope
- Disciplines: Cyclo-cross, Road
- Role: Rider

Amateur teams
- 2021–2022: Hollebeekhoeve CT
- 2023–: Athletes for Hope

Professional teams
- 2011–2013: BKCP–Powerplus
- 2014–2019: Vastgoedservice–Golden Palace

Jens Adams (born 5 June 1992) is a Belgian cyclo-cross and road cyclist.

== Major results ==
=== Cyclo-cross ===
2009–2010
1st Junior Namur
2012–2013
Under-23 Superprestige

2nd Ruddervoorde
2nd Zonhoven
2nd Gavere
2nd Gieten

Under-23 Bpost Bank Trophy

3rd Koppenberg

2013–2014
1st National Under-23 Championships
Under-23 Superprestige

2nd Gavere

2016–2017
1st Illnau
DVV Trophy

2nd Ronse

Soudal Classics

2nd Neerpelt

Toi Toi Cup

3rd Tábor

2017–2018
Soudal Classics

3rd Neerpelt

2018–2019
Soudal Classics

2nd Hasselt

2nd Bensheim
Brico Cross

3rd Bredene

2019–2020
3rd Zonnebeke
2020–2021
3rd Gullegem
2021–2022
2nd Oostmalle
X²O Badkamers Trophy

3rd Brussels

2022–2023
Exact Cross

2nd Essen

2nd Oisterwijk
2023–2024
Exact Cross

2nd Essen

UCI World Cup

5th Dublin

2024–2025
1st Mechelen
2nd Bensheim
Exact Cross

3rd Essen

=== Road ===
2009
2nd Overall Oberösterreich Juniorenrundfahrt
2010
3rd Remouchamps–Ferrières–Remouchamps
4th Overall Tour du Valromey
4th Overall Niedersachsen-Rundfahrt
2015
1st Overall Tour de Namur

1st Stages 3 & 4

2018
4th Heistse Pijl
8th Grote Prijs Marcel Kint

=== Mountain Bike ===
2021
1st Overall Transmaurienne Vanoise
3 Nations Cup

3rd Spaarnwoude

2022
3 Nations Cup

1st Genk

2nd Sittard
3rd Cross-country, National Championships
