= 2012 UCI Cyclo-cross World Championships – Men's elite race =

Men's Elite Cyclo-cross Race
2012 UCI Cyclo-cross World Championships
- Rainbow jersey

Race details
- Dates: January 29, 2012
- Stages: 1
- Distance: 29.44 km (18.29 mi)
- Winning time: 1h 06' 07" (26.72 km/h or 16.60 mph)

Medalists
	Gold	Niels Albert (Belgium)
	Silver	Rob Peeters (Belgium)
	Bronze	Kevin Pauwels (Belgium)

This event was held on Sunday 29 January 2012 as part of the 2012 UCI Cyclo-cross World Championships at Koksijde, Belgium. Ten laps had to be completed, totalling up to 29.44 kilometre.

== Summary ==
In the weeks before the race, four favourites emerged: Sven Nys, who has been considered a favourite on about every race since he became a professional, Kevin Pauwels, who had won the World Cup the week before, Zdeněk Štybar, the World Champion of the two previous years and Niels Albert, who had a lousy season, but is known to be great in the sand.

Albert started very quickly with Štybar right behind him. However halfway round the first lap Albert was already alone while Štybar got caught up by the pack. A lap later Pauwels had left the others and was gaining on Albert, but never actually got there. Meanwhile, in the background, the five other Belgian riders were together with Štybar hanging at the end of that group.

By lap four, Nys had joined Pauwels in the chase on Albert who had kept on widening the gap. Their combined efforts were not enough as the gap kept on growing while from behind the four other Belgians, with an impressive Rob Peeters, were slowly gaining ground. The riders from other countries were nowhere to be seen.

Albert kept on going solo till the end and took home his second World Championship title. The chasing group consisted completely of the six other Belgians. Tom Meeusen and Rob Peeters were looking the best, but Meeusen fell in the sand in the last lap. Peeters did keep his stability and got a silver medal, Pauwels completed the podium. Nys ended as the last Belgian, the chase on Albert had destroyed him.

== Ranking ==
Rank	Cyclist	Time
Gold medal	Niels Albert (BEL)	1h 06' 07"
Silver medal	Rob Peeters (BEL)	+ 24"
Bronze medal	Kevin Pauwels (BEL)	+ 30"
4	Tom Meeusen (BEL)	+ 34"
5	Bart Aernouts (BEL)	+ 35"
6	Klaas Vantornout (BEL)	+ 1'09"
7	Sven Nys (BEL)	+ 1'11"
8	Radomír Šimůnek (CZE)	+ 2'15"
9	Philipp Walsleben (GER)	+ 2'24"
10	Simon Zahner (SUI)	+ 2'31"
11	Steve Chainel (FRA)	+ 2'37"
12	Francis Mourey (FRA)	+ 2'48"
13	Zdeněk Štybar (CZE)	+ 3'17"
14	Aurélien Duval (FRA)	+ 3'41"
15	Niels Wubben (NED)	s.t.
16	Julien Taramarcaz (SUI)	+ 3'42"
17	Gerben De Knegt (NED)	s.t.
18	Ryan Trebon (USA)	+ 4'02"
19	Marcel Meisen (GER)	+ 4'06"
20	José Antonio Hermida (ESP)	s.t.
21	Twan Van Den Brand (NED)	+ 4'07"
22	Mariusz Gil (POL)	+ 4'22"
23	Thijs Van Amerongen (NED)	+ 4'40"
24	Christoph Pfingsten (GER)	+ 5'10"
25	Christian Heule (SUI)	1 LAP
26	Jeremy Powers (USA)	2 LAPS
27	Marcel Wildhaber (GER)	2 LAPS
28	Enrico Franzoi (ITA)	2 LAPS
29	John Gadret (FRA)	2 LAPS
30	Jiri Polnicky (CZE)	2 LAPS
31	Martin Zlámalík (CZE)	2 LAPS
32	Mitchell Huenders (NED)	3 LAPS
33	Vladimir Kyzivat (CZE)	3 LAPS
34	Timothy Johnson (USA)	3 LAPS
35	Isaac Suarez Fernandez (ESP)	3 LAPS
36	Ian Field (GBR)	3 LAPS
37	Petr Dlask (CZE)	3 LAPS
38	Clément Bourgoin (FRA)	3 LAPS
39	Sascha Weber (GER)	3 LAPS
40	Marco Ponta (ITA)	3 LAPS
41	Javier Ruiz De Larrinaga (ESP)	3 LAPS
42	James Driscoll (USA)	3 LAPS
43	Christopher Jones (USA)	5 LAPS
44	Mirko Tabacchi (ITA)	5 LAPS
45	Yu Takenouchi (JPN)	5 LAPS
46	Magnus Darvell (SWE)	5 LAPS
47	Martin Haring (SVK)	5 LAPS
48	Gusty Bausch (LUX)	5 LAPS
49	Christian Helmig (LUX)	5 LAPS
50	Cristian Cominelli (ITA)	5 LAPS
51	Craig Richey (CAN)	6 LAPS
52	Aitor Hernández (ESP)	6 LAPS
53	Vaclav Metlicka (SVK)	6 LAPS
54	Daniel Geismayr (AUT)	6 LAPS
55	Keiichi Tsujiura (JPN)	6 LAPS
56	Karl Heinz Gollinger (AUT)	7 LAPS
57	Lewis Rattray (AUS)	7 LAPS
58	Robert Gehbauer (AUT)	7 LAPS
59	David Quist (NOR)	8 LAPS
