= 2017 UCI Cyclo-cross World Championships – Men's elite race =

Men's elite race
2017 UCI Cyclo-cross World Championships
- Rainbow jersey

Race details
- Dates: 29 January 2017
- Stages: 1
- Distance: 24.67 km (15.33 mi)
- Winning time: 1h 02' 08"

Medalists
	Gold	Wout Van Aert (Belgium)
	Silver	Mathieu van der Poel (Netherlands)
	Bronze	Kevin Pauwels (Belgium)

This event was held on 29 January 2017 as part of the 2017 UCI Cyclo-cross World Championships in Belvaux, Luxembourg. Participants must be men born in 1994 or before. It was won by Wout van Aert of Belgium.

== Race report ==
Wout van Aert and Mathieu van der Poel were the big favourites before the race, having dominated the whole season and dividing the majority of races between them.

In contrast to the previous races, snow and ice were much less and the track had become much more muddy and therefore slower. As a result, several rocks surfaced which were barely visible and often covered in small pools of water. The race would turn out to become tough on the material, with especially flat tyres playing a deciding role.

Just after the start, Belgian Tom Meeusen broke his bicycle at the first obstacle and was forced to retire immediately. Meanwhile, van der Poel immediately raced away from the pack with only Kevin Pauwels able to follow. A chase group involved van Aert, Tim Merlier, Michael Vanthourenhout, Corné van Kessel, Stan Godrie, Clément Venturini and Lars van der Haar already 15 seconds back after the first lap. A puncture by Pauwels caused him to drop back, leaving van der Poel going solo from lap two. In the chasing group several riders also suffered multiple punctures and dropped back, with only van Aert able to remain about ten seconds behind.

Van der Poel suffered successive punctures on laps 2, 3 and 4 but each time closely before the pit lane, not losing much time but allowing van Aert to close the gap each lap, finally getting back together on lap 4. Behind the two leaders the gap kept widening, however the first chaser changed often as punctures caused many riders to drop back from a good position. Several riders suffered several punctures and some riders even dropped out of the race as they ran out of spare tyres, including 2008 World Champion Lars Boom.

The two leaders remained together until lap 6 when disaster struck for van der Poel as he suffered a puncture a long distance from the pits, causing him to lose 30 seconds on van Aert. Van Aert now only needed to avoid punctures in the last three laps to win his second consecutive world title, in which he succeeded. As the other riders were already over a minute back, van der Poel had no problem securing second but was visibly disappointed with his second place and eventually finished in tears 44 seconds behind van Aert.

In the fight for third, over two minutes behind van Aert, Pauwels was able to overtake van der Haar on the final lap to take his fifth bronze medal at the UCI Cyclo-cross World Championships following earlier third places in 2011, 2012, 2014 and 2016.

== Results ==
Rank	Cyclist	Time
Gold medal	Wout van Aert (BEL)	1h 02' 08"
Silver medal	Mathieu van der Poel (NED)	+ 44"
Bronze medal	Kevin Pauwels (BEL)	+ 2' 09"
4	Lars van der Haar (NED)	+ 2' 52"
5	Corné van Kessel (NED)	+ 3' 09"
6	Laurens Sweeck (BEL)	+ 3' 29"
7	Michael Boros (CZE)	+ 3' 47"
8	Gianni Vermeersch (BEL)	+ 4' 02"
9	Simon Zahner (SUI)	+ 4' 08"
10	Sascha Weber (GER)	+ 4' 29"
11	Jan Nesvadba (CZE)	+ 4' 50"
12	Tim Merlier (BEL)	+ 5' 07"
13	Philipp Walsleben (GER)	+ 5' 07"
14	Severin Sagesser (SUI)	+ 5' 18"
15	Nicola Rohrbach (SUI)	+ 5' 28"
16	Javier Ruiz de Larrinaga (ESP)	+ 5' 35"
17	Michael Vanthourenhout (BEL)	+ 5' 40"
18	Stephen Hyde (USA)	+ 5' 41"
19	Julien Taramarcaz (SUI)	+ 5' 57"
20	Luca Braidot (ITA)	+ 6' 05"
21	Matthieu Boulo (FRA)	+ 6' 15"
22	Emil Hekele (CZE)	+ 6' 26"
23	Alois Falenta (FRA)	+ 6' 26"
24	Marcel Wildhaber (SUI)	+ 6' 29"
25	Marek Konwa (POL)	+ 6' 41"
26	Tomas Paprstka (CZE)	+ 6' 49"
27	Ismael Esteban Agüero (ESP)	+ 7' 03"
28	Martin Haring (SVK)	+ 7' 18"
29	Clément Venturini (FRA)	+ 7' 38"
30	David van der Poel (NED)	+ 2 laps
31	Francis Mourey (FRA)	+ 2 laps
32	Jeremy Powers (USA)	+ 2 laps
33	Kerry Werner (USA)	+ 2 laps
34	Stan Godrie (NED)	+ 2 laps
35	Cristian Cominelli (ITA)	+ 2 laps
36	Kenneth Hansen (DEN)	+ 2 laps
37	Ian Field (GBR)	+ 2 laps
38	Michael Van Den Ham (CAN)	+ 2 laps
39	Michal Malik (CZE)	+ 2 laps
40	Daniele Braidot (ITA)	+ 2 laps
41	Steve Chainel (FRA)	+ 2 laps
42	Lex Reichling (LUX)	+ 3 laps
43	Kevin Suarez Fernandez (ESP)	+ 3 laps
44	Lars Boom (NED)	+ 3 laps
45	Joachim Parbo (DEN)	+ 3 laps
46	Gusty Bausch (LUX)	+ 3 laps
47	Jeremy Martin (CAN)	+ 3 laps
48	Aitor Hernandez Gutierrez (ESP)	+ 3 laps
49	Travis Livermon (USA)	+ 3 laps
50	Zsolt Bur (HUN)	+ 3 laps
51	Hikaru Kosaka (JPN)	+ 3 laps
52	Scott Thiltges (LUX)	+ 3 laps
53	Kohei Maeda (JPN)	+ 4 laps
54	Tommy Nielsen (DEN)	+ 4 laps
55	Mark McConnell (CAN)	+ 4 laps
56	Ingvar Ómarsson (ISL)	+ 4 laps
57	Tobin Ortenblad (USA)	+ 4 laps
58	Pit Schlechter (LUX)	+ 4 laps
59	Jeremy Durrin (USA)	+ 4 laps
60	Christian Helmig (LUX)	+ 4 laps
	Marcel Meisen (GER)	DNF7
	Jack Kisseberth (USA)	DNF5
	Toki Sawada (JPN)	DNF2
	Tom Meeusen (BEL)	DNF1

== Fastest laps ==
Overall

Pos.	Cyclist	Time	Lap
1	Wout van Aert (BEL)	7:30.2	Lap 6
2	Mathieu van der Poel (NED)	7:38.1	Lap 1
3	Kevin Pauwels (BEL)	7:44.3	Lap 1
4	Laurens Sweeck (BEL)	7:46.6	Lap 4
5	Corné van Kessel (NED)	7:49.8	Lap 2
6	Michael Vanthourenhout (BEL)	7:50.3	Lap 4
7	Tim Merlier (BEL)	7:50.7	Lap 1
7	Philipp Walsleben (GER)	7:50.7	Lap 2
9	Gianni Vermeersch (BEL)	7:51.0	Lap 4
10	Stan Godrie (NED)	7:51.4	Lap 1

By lap

Lap	Cyclist	Time
Start	Mathieu van der Poel (NED)	32"
1	Mathieu van der Poel (NED)	7' 38"
2	Wout van Aert (BEL)	7' 39"
3	Wout van Aert (BEL)	7' 41"
4	Wout van Aert (BEL)	7' 45"
5	Wout van Aert (BEL)	7' 45"
6	Wout van Aert (BEL)	7' 30"
7	Wout van Aert (BEL)	7' 33"
8	Kevin Pauwels (BEL)	7' 48"
