= Tom Meeusen =

Belgian racing cyclist (born 1988)

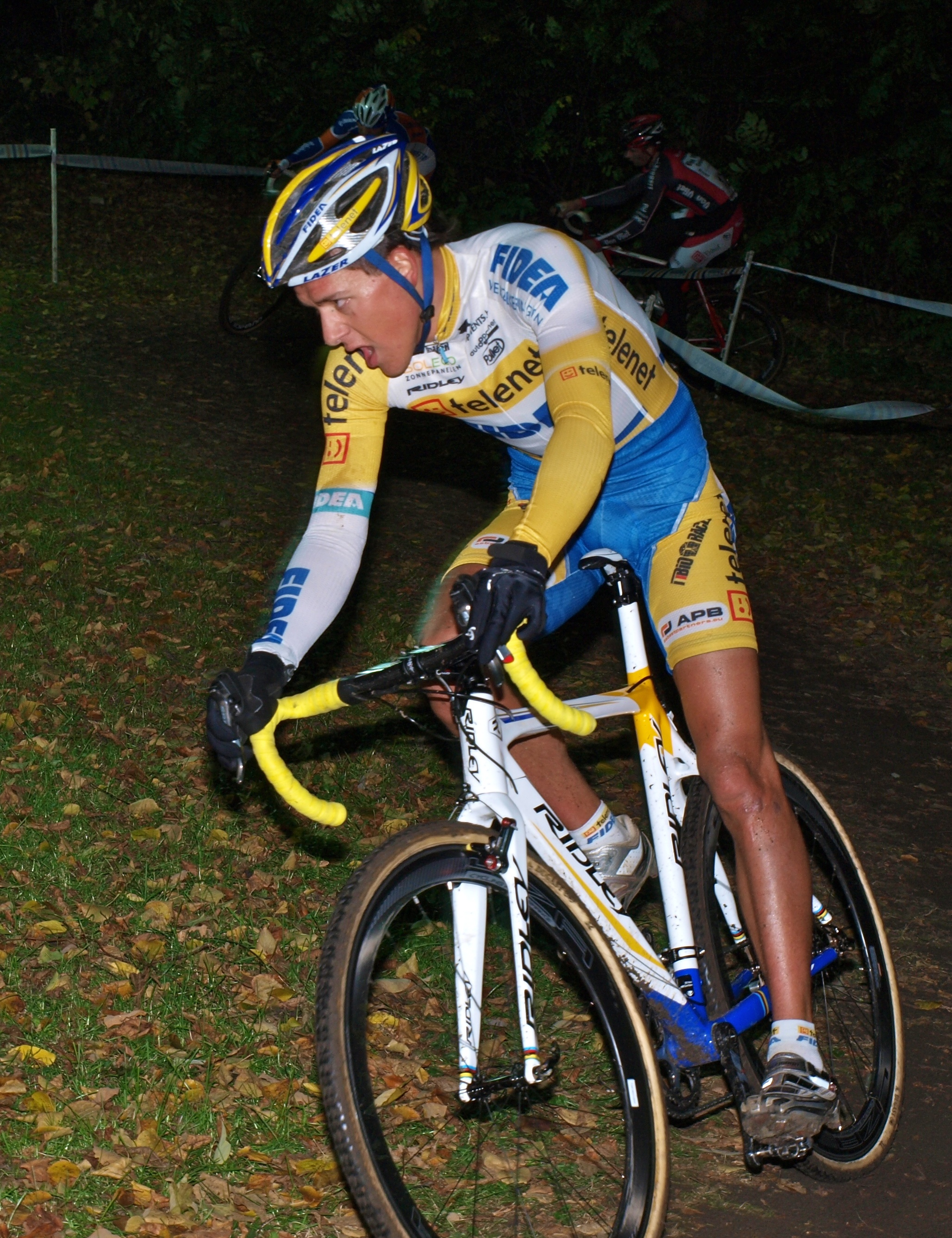
- Meeusen at the 2010 Nacht van Woerden.

Personal information
- Full name: Tom Meeusen
- Born: November 7, 1988 (age 37) Brasschaat, Belgium
- Height: 1.76 m (5 ft 9 in)
- Weight: 62 kg (137 lb)

Cycling career
- Sport: Cycling
- Current team: Group Hens–Maes Containers
- Disciplines: Cyclo-cross, mountain bike and road
- Role: Rider

Professional teams
- 2006–2017: Fidea
- 2017–2019: Beobank–Corendon
- 2020–: Group Hens–Maes Containers

Tom Meeusen (born 7 November 1988) is a Belgian cyclo-cross and road racing cyclist, who currently rides for UCI Cyclo-cross team Group Hens–Maes Containers.

== Major results ==
2005–2006
1st Overall Junior Superprestige

1st Ruddervoorde
1st Sint-Michielsgestel
1st Gavere
1st Diegem
1st Vorselaar

2nd Overall UCI Junior World Cup

1st Kalmthout

3rd UCI World Junior Championships
2007–2008
1st National Under-23 Championships
1st Overall Under-23 Gazet van Antwerpen

1st Koppenberg

Under-23 Superprestige

1st Ruddervoorde
1st Vorselaar

2008–2009
Under-23 Gazet van Antwerpen

1st Oostmalle

1st Under-23 Neerpelt
1st Under-23 Oostmalle
1st Under-23 Zonhoven
2009–2010
1st Overall UCI Under-23 World Cup

1st Heusden-Zolder
1st Roubaix

1st Overall Under-23 Superprestige

1st Gavere
1st Hamme
1st Gieten
1st Diegem
1st Vorselaar

1st Overall Under-23 Gazet van Antwerpen

1st Hasselt
1st Essen
1st Loenhout
1st Baal

1st Under-23 Neerpelt
2nd UCI World Under-23 Championships
3rd UEC European Under-23 Championships
2010–2011
UCI World Cup

1st Kalmthout

Superprestige

1st Gieten

1st Woerden
2011–2012
Superprestige

1st Hoogstraten

Gazet van Antwerpen

1st Lille

2012–2013
1st Zonnebeke
2013–2014
UCI World Cup

1st Nommay

Bpost Bank Trophy

1st Koppenberg

Superprestige

1st Middelkerke

1st Eeklo
1st Rosmalen
1st Laarne
2014–2015
Superprestige

1st Ruddervoorde

1st Overijse
2nd National Championships
2015–2016
BPost Bank Trophy

1st Loenhout

1st Ardooie
1st Kleicross
1st Rucphen
2016–2017
Soudal Classics

1st Sint-Niklaas

DVV Trophy

2nd Loenhout
3rd Essen
3rd Lille

3rd Overall UCI World Cup

2nd Hoogerheide
3rd Fiuggi

3rd Oostmalle
3rd Mol
2017–2018
Brico Cross

3rd Hulst

3rd Overijse
3rd Mol
2018–2019
DVV Trophy

2nd Hamme

Soudal Classics

2nd Leuven

3rd Sint-Niklaas
3rd Oostmalle
2019–2020
2nd Mol
2021–2022
1st Oisterwijk
Ethias Cross

2nd Leuven
