= 2013–14 Cyclo-cross bpost bank trophy =

2013–2014 Cyclo-cross BPost Bank Trophy
Details
- Dates: 13 October 2013 – 23 February 2014
- Location: Belgium
- Races: 8

The BPost Bank Trophy 2013–2014 is a season long cyclo-cross competition which began on 13 October with the GP Mario De Clercq and will end on 23 February in Oostmalle.

This edition follows the ranking system introduced the year before, using time instead of points.

== Calendar ==
Date	Race	Location	Winner	Second	Third	Classification leader
13 October	GP Mario De Clercq	Ronse	Sven Nys (BEL)	Martin Bína (CZE)	Niels Albert (BEL)	Sven Nys (BEL)
1 November	Koppenbergcross	Oudenaarde	Tom Meeusen (BEL)	Kevin Pauwels (BEL)	Klaas Vantornout (BEL)	Sven Nys (BEL)
16 November	Grand Prix van Hasselt	Hasselt	Sven Nys (BEL)	Niels Albert (BEL)	Klaas Vantornout (BEL)	Sven Nys (BEL)
21 December	Grand Prix Rouwmoer	Essen	Kevin Pauwels (BEL)	Sven Nys (BEL)	Niels Albert (BEL)	Sven Nys (BEL)
27 December	Azencross	Wuustwezel	Sven Nys (BEL)	Rob Peeters (BEL)	Niels Albert (BEL)	Sven Nys (BEL)
1 January	Grand Prix Sven Nys	Baal	Sven Nys (BEL)	Zdeněk Štybar (CZE)	Niels Albert (BEL)	Sven Nys (BEL)
8 February	Krawatencross	Lille	Sven Nys (BEL)	Lars van der Haar (NED)	Tom Meeusen (BEL)	Sven Nys (BEL)
23 February	Sluitingsprijs Oostmalle	Oostmalle	Niels Albert (BEL)	Tom Meeusen (BEL)	Kevin Pauwels (BEL)	Sven Nys (BEL)

== Ranking (top 10) ==
	Rider	Team	Time
1	Sven Nys (BEL)	Crelan-AA Drink	8h 10' 51"
2	Niels Albert (BEL)	BKCP–Powerplus	+ 2' 25"
3	Tom Meeusen (BEL)	Telenet-Fidea	+ 7' 10"
4	Rob Peeters (BEL)	Vastgoedservice-Golden Palace	+ 9' 26"
5	Thijs van Amerongen (NED)	AA Drink	+ 10' 05"
6	Bart Aernouts (BEL)	AA Drink	+ 10' 43"
7	Philipp Walsleben (DEU)	BKCP–Powerplus	+ 11' 12"
8	Kevin Pauwels (BEL)	Sunweb-Napoleon Games	+ 13' 37"
9	Klaas Vantornout (BEL)	Sunweb-Napoleon Games	+ 15' 35"
10	Jim Aernouts (BEL)	Sunweb-Napoleon Games	+ 18' 54"

== Results ==
=== Ronse ===
	Rider	Team	Time	Bonus
1	Sven Nys (BEL)	Crelan-KDL	57' 06"	15"
2	Martin Bína (CZE)	Kwadro-Stannah	+ 17"	20"
3	Niels Albert (BEL)	BKCP–Powerplus	+ 20"	5"
4	Klaas Vantornout (BEL)	Sunweb-Napoleon Games	+ 1' 08"	
5	Marcel Meisen (DEU)	Kwadro-Stannah	+ 1' 08"	
6	Thijs van Amerongen (NED)	AA Drink	+ 1' 08"	5"
7	Lars van der Haar (NED)	Rabobank-Giant	+ 1' 30"	15"
8	Philipp Walsleben (DEU)	BKCP–Powerplus	+ 1' 36"	
9	Bart Aernouts (BEL)	AA Drink	+ 1' 58"	
10	Twan van den Brand (NED)	Orange Babies	+ 2' 11"	

=== Oudenaarde ===
	Rider	Team	Time	Bonus
1	Tom Meeusen (BEL)	Telenet-Fidea	59' 06"	15"
2	Kevin Pauwels (BEL)	Sunweb-Napoleon Games	+ 2"	10"
3	Klaas Vantornout (BEL)	Sunweb-Napoleon Games	+ 5"	5"
4	Philipp Walsleben (DEU)	BKCP–Powerplus	+ 9"	
5	Sven Nys (BEL)	Crelan-KDL	+ 10"	
6	Rob Peeters (BEL)	Telenet-Fidea	+ 24"	10"
7	Corné van Kessel (NED)	Telenet-Fidea	+ 25"	
8	Niels Albert (BEL)	BKCP–Powerplus	+ 25"	
9	Thijs van Amerongen (NED)	AA Drink	+ 40"	
10	Julien Taramarcaz (SUI)	BMC Mountainbike Racing	+ 46"	

=== Hasselt ===
	Rider	Team	Time	Bonus
1	Sven Nys (BEL)	Crelan-KDL	59' 53"	15"
2	Niels Albert (BEL)	BKCP–Powerplus	s.t.	10"
3	Klaas Vantornout (BEL)	Sunweb-Napoleon Games	s.t.	20"
4	Tom Meeusen (BEL)	Telenet-Fidea	+ 11"	
5	Corné van Kessel (NED)	Telenet-Fidea	+ 21"	
6	Bart Aernouts (BEL)	AA Drink	+ 25"	
7	Bart Wellens (BEL)	Telenet-Fidea	+ 29"	
8	Wietse Bosmans (BEL)	BKCP–Powerplus	+ 31"	
9	Thijs van Amerongen (NED)	AA Drink	+ 31"	
10	Jim Aernouts (BEL)	Sunweb-Napoleon Games	+ 43"	

=== Essen ===
	Rider	Team	Time	Bonus
1	Kevin Pauwels (BEL)	Sunweb-Napoleon Games	1h 01' 48"	15"
2	Sven Nys (BEL)	Crelan-KDL	+ 28"	15"
3	Niels Albert (BEL)	BKCP–Powerplus	+ 34"	5"
4	Jim Aernouts (BEL)	Sunweb-Napoleon Games	+ 36"	
5	Thijs van Amerongen (NED)	AA Drink	+ 38"	15"
6	Rob Peeters (BEL)	Telenet-Fidea	+ 41"	
7	Bart Aernouts (BEL)	AA Drink	+ 47"	
8	Zdeněk Štybar (CZE)	Omega Pharma–Quick-Step	+ 54"	
9	Klaas Vantornout (BEL)	Sunweb-Napoleon Games	+ 1' 04"	
10	Philipp Walsleben (DEU)	BKCP–Powerplus	+ 1' 10"	

=== Wuustwezel ===
	Rider	Team	Time	Bonus
1	Sven Nys (BEL)	Crelan-KDL	1h 01' 52"	20"
2	Rob Peeters (BEL)	Telenet-Fidea	+ 21"	10"
3	Niels Albert (BEL)	BKCP–Powerplus	+ 24"	15"
4	Klaas Vantornout (BEL)	Sunweb-Napoleon Games	+ 43"	
5	Zdeněk Štybar (CZE)	Omega Pharma–Quick-Step	+ 48"	
6	Philipp Walsleben (DEU)	BKCP–Powerplus	+ 54"	
7	Wietse Bosmans (BEL)	BKCP–Powerplus	+ 54"	
8	Jim Aernouts (BEL)	Sunweb-Napoleon Games	+ 58"	
9	Julien Taramarcaz (SUI)	BMC Mountainbike Racing	+ 1' 03"	
10	Bart Wellens (BEL)	Telenet-Fidea	+ 1' 10"	

=== Baal ===
	Rider	Team	Time	Bonus
1	Sven Nys (BEL)	Crelan-AA Drink	1h 03' 39"	30"
2	Zdeněk Štybar (CZE)	Omega Pharma–Quick-Step	+ 51"	10"
3	Niels Albert (BEL)	BKCP–Powerplus	+ 57"	5"
4	Rob Peeters (BEL)	Vastgoedservice-Golden Palace	+ 1' 10"	10"
5	Tom Meeusen (BEL)	Telenet-Fidea	+ 1' 39"	
6	Thijs van Amerongen (NED)	AA Drink	+ 1' 55"	
7	Philipp Walsleben (DEU)	BKCP–Powerplus	+ 2' 22"	5"
8	Bart Aernouts (BEL)	AA Drink	+ 2' 22"	
9	Corné van Kessel (NED)	Telenet-Fidea	+ 2' 27"	
10	Marcel Meisen (DEU)	KwadrO-Stannah	+ 3' 10"	

=== Lille ===
	Rider	Team	Time	Bonus
1	Sven Nys (BEL)	Crelan-AA Drink	1h 03' 06"	15"
2	Lars van der Haar (NED)	Rabobank-Giant	s.t.	15"
3	Tom Meeusen (BEL)	Telenet-Fidea	+ 4"	15"
4	Kevin Pauwels (BEL)	Sunweb-Napoleon Games	+ 38"	
5	Niels Albert (BEL)	BKCP–Powerplus	+ 1' 08"	15"
6	Corné van Kessel (NED)	Telenet-Fidea	+ 1' 08"	
7	Radomír Šimůnek (CZE)	KwadrO-Stannah	+ 1' 16"	
8	Dieter Vanthourenhout (BEL)	Sunweb-Napoleon Games	+ 1' 23"	
9	Bart Aernouts (BEL)	AA Drink	+ 1' 23"	
10	Jim Aernouts (BEL)	Sunweb-Napoleon Games	+ 1' 44"	

=== Oostmalle ===
	Rider	Team	Time	Bonus
1	Niels Albert (BEL)	BKCP–Powerplus	1h 04' 18"	25"
2	Tom Meeusen (BEL)	Telenet-Fidea	+ 7"	15"
3	Kevin Pauwels (BEL)	Sunweb-Napoleon Games	+ 39"	5"
4	Lars van der Haar (NED)	Rabobank-Giant	+ 55"	
5	Eddy van IJzendoorn (NED)	Team NatuBalans-Apex	+ 59"	
6	Dieter Vanthourenhout (BEL)	Sunweb-Napoleon Games	+ 59"	
7	Philipp Walsleben (DEU)	BKCP–Powerplus	+ 1' 01"	
8	Bart Aernouts (BEL)	AA Drink	+ 1' 09"	
9	Rob Peeters (BEL)	Vastgoedservice-Golden Palace	+ 1' 15"	
10	Sven Nys (BEL)	Crelan-AA Drink	+ 1' 30"	15"
