= Baloise–Trek Lions =

Belgian cycling team

Baloise–Glowi Lions
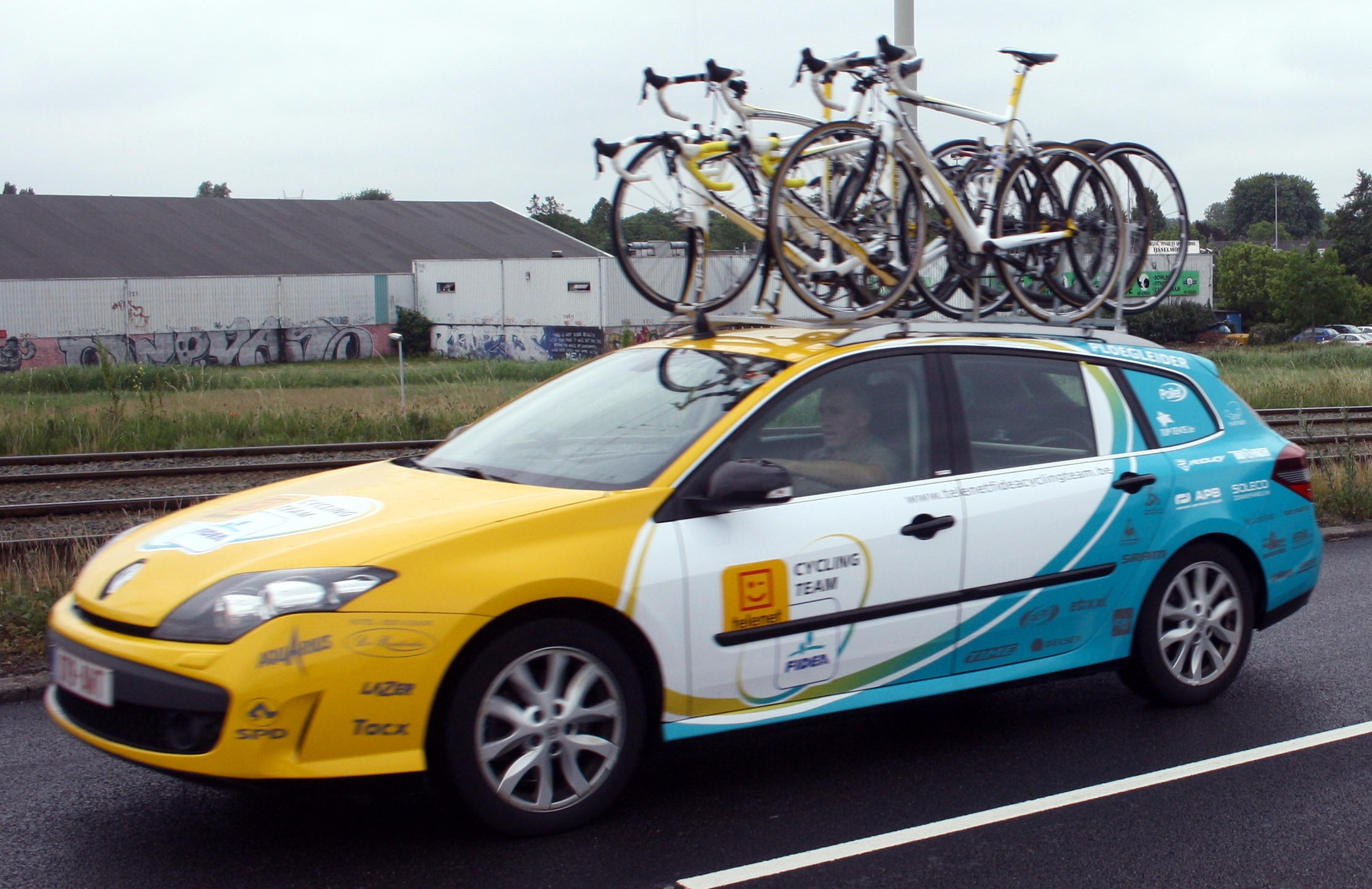

Team information
- UCI code: FID (2006–2012); TFC (2013–2016); TFL (2017–2019); TBL (2020–2021); BTL (2022–)
- Registered: Belgium
- Founded: 2000
- Disciplines: Cyclo-cross; Road
- Status: UCI Continental (2005–2020); UCI Cyclo-cross Team (2021–)

Key personnel
- General manager: Hans Van Kasteren (until 2016); Sven Nys (since 2016)

Team name history
- 2000–2004 2004–2009 2009–2016 2017–2019 2020 2021-: Spaarselect; Fidea Cycling Team; Telenet–Fidea; Telenet–Fidea Lions; Telenet–Baloise Lions; Baloise–Trek Lions
Baloise–Trek Lions jersey
Jersey

Baloise–Trek Lions (UCI Code: BTL) is a Belgian professional cycling team based in Belgium which focuses predominantly on the cyclo-cross season. The team is named after its main sponsors, Bâloise and Trek. The team had various different names in the past amongst which Spaar-Select and Telenet-Fidea.

Previous leaders of the team are the former Cyclo-Cross World Champions – Erwin Vervecken and Bart Wellens as well as the double Under 23 Cyclo-Cross World Champion, Zdeněk Štybar. Kevin Pauwels also rode for the team. The team manager is Sven Nys and the directeur sportifs include two former Cyclo-Cross World Champions – Danny De Bie and Roland Liboton.

== Team roster ==
As of 24 July 2023.

Rider	Date of birth
Yentl Bekaert (Note: Bekaert retired on 26 February.) (BEL)	18 July 1999 (age 27)
Olivier Godfroid (BEL)	17 August 1994 (age 32)
David Haverdings (NED)	1 April 2004 (age 22)
Ward Huybs (BEL)	21 November 2001 (age 24)
Dietmar Ledegen (BEL)	5 November 1992 (age 33)

Rider	Date of birth
Daan Mariën (BEL)	29 January 1999 (age 27)
Joris Nieuwenhuis (NED)	11 February 1996 (age 30)
Pim Ronhaar (NED)	20 July 2001 (age 25)
Seppe Van Den Boer (Note: Van Den Boer is set to join the team on 1 September.) (BEL)	28 November 2005 (age 20)
Lars van der Haar (NED)	23 July 1991 (age 35)

== Major victories ==
=== Men ===
==== Cyclo-cross ====
2000
Cyklokros Tábor, Bart Wellens
2001
Cyclo-cross Wetzikon, Bart Wellens
Cyclo-cross Harnes, Bart Wellens
2002
2003
UCI Cyclo-cross World Championships, Bart Wellens
Cyclo-cross Wetzikon, Bart Wellens
Cyclo-cross Koppenberg, Bart Wellens
Cyclo-cross Vossem, Bart Wellens
Cyclo-cross Kalmthout, Bart Wellens
Azencross, Bart Wellens
2004
UCI Cyclo-cross World Championships, Bart Wellens
Belgium Cyclo-cross Championships, Bart Wellens
Grand Prix Nommay, Bart Wellens
Vlaamse Aardbeiencross, Erwin Vervecken
Duinencross Koksijde, Erwin Vervecken
Superprestige Diegem, Erwin Vervecken
2005
Vlaamse Aardbeiencross, Erwin Vervecken
Cyclo-cross Ruddervoorde, Bart Wellens
Cyclo-cross Sint-Michielsgestel, Bart Wellens
Ziklokross Igorre, Bart Wellens
2006
UCI Cyclo-cross World Championships, Erwin Vervecken
Luxembourg Cyclo-cross Championships, Jempy Drucker
Niel Jaarmarkt Cyclo-cross, Bart Wellens
Trofeo Mamma & Papà Guerciotti, Bart Wellens
Kersttrofee Hofstade, Erwin Vervecken
2007
UCI Cyclo-cross World Championships, Erwin Vervecken
Belgium Cyclo-cross Championships, Bart Wellens
Czech Republic Cyclo-cross Championships, Petr Dlask
Cyclo-cross Kalmthout, Zdeněk Štybar
Niel Jaarmarkt Cyclo-cross, Bart Wellens
2008
Czech Republic Cyclo-cross Championships, Zdeněk Štybar
Luxembourg Cyclo-cross Championships, Jempy Drucker
Grand Prix van Hasselt, Bart Wellens
Duinencross Koksijde, Erwin Vervecken
Superprestige Diegem, Zdeněk Štybar
Azencross, Zdeněk Štybar
2009
Czech Republic Cyclo-cross Championships, Zdeněk Štybar
Grand Prix van Hasselt, Zdeněk Štybar
Bollekescross, Zdeněk Štybar
Duinencross Koksijde, Zdeněk Štybar
Ziklokross Igorre, Zdeněk Štybar
Cyclo-cross Zolder, Kevin Pauwels
2010
UCI Cyclo-cross World Championships, Zdeněk Štybar
Czech Republic Cyclo-cross Championships, Zdeněk Štybar
Slovakia Cyclo-cross Championships, Robert Gavenda
Overall UCI Cyclo-cross World Cup, Zdeněk Štybar
Overall Cyclo-cross Superprestige, Zdeněk Štybar
Cyclo-cross Roubaix, Zdeněk Štybar
Cyclo-cross Vorselaar, Zdeněk Štybar
Sluitingsprijs Oostmalle, Bart Wellens
Cyclo-cross Namur, Zdeněk Štybar
Cyclo-cross Ruddervoorde, Zdeněk Štybar
Cyclo-cross Aigle, Zdeněk Štybar
Cyklokros Plzeň, Zdeněk Štybar
Grand Prix van Hasselt, Kevin Pauwels
Cyclo-cross Gieten, Tom Meeusen
Cyclo-cross Kalmthout, Tom Meeusen
2011
UCI Cyclo-cross World Championships, Zdeněk Štybar
Czech Republic Cyclo-cross Championships, Zdeněk Štybar
Switzerland Cyclo-cross Championships, Arnaud Grand
Cyclo-cross Essen, Bart Wellens
Cyclo-cross Pont-Château, Kevin Pauwels
Krawatencross, Kevin Pauwels
2012
Krawatencross, Tom Meeusen
Vlaamse Aardbeiencross, Tom Meeusen
2013
Cyclo-cross Koppenberg, Tom Meeusen
2014
Gran Prix Nommay, Tom Meeusen
Noordzeecross, Tom Meeusen
2021
Cyclo-cross Superprestige Gieten, Toon Aerts
UCI Cyclo-cross World Cup Zonhoven, Toon Aerts
X²O Badkamers Trophy U23 Koppenbergcross, Pim Ronhaar
UCI Cyclo-cross World Cup Tábor, Lars Van der Haar
Cyclo-cross de La Grandville, Thijs Aerts
X²O Badkamers Trophy Urban Cross, Toon Aerts
X²O Badkamers Trophy U23 Urban Cross, Pim Ronhaar

==== Road cycling ====
2006
Stage 3 Tour des Pyrénées, Zdeněk Štybar
Stage 6 Volta a Lleida, Zdeněk Štybar
2007
Stage 1 Volta a Lleida, Kevin Pauwels
2008
Stage 1 Volta a Lleida, Bart Wellens
Stage 2 Volta a Lleida, Kevin Pauwels
2009
2010
Stage 1 Flèche du Sud, Kevin Pauwels
Stage 4 Tour de Serbie, Kevin Pauwels
Prologue Tour de Slovaquie, Zdeněk Štybar
2011
Stage 6 Tour de Serbie, Tom Meeusen
2017
Internationale Wielertrofee Jong Maar Moedig, Toon Aerts
2018
Stage 4 Oberösterreichrundfahrt, Quinten Hermans
Stage 4 Tour de Wallonie, Quinten Hermans
2019
Overall Flèche du Sud, Quinten Hermans

Prologue, Stages 1 & 2, Quinten Hermans

=== Women ===
==== Cyclo-cross ====
2021
Cyclo-cross Superprestige Gieten, Lucinda Brand
USCX Cyclocross Jingle Cross, Shirin van Anrooij
Cyclo-cross Superprestige Jaarmarktcross, Lucinda Brand
UCI Cyclo-cross World Cup Tabor, Lucinda Brand
Cyclo-cross Superprestige Merksplas, Lucinda Brand
X²O Badkamers Trophy Urban Cross, Lucinda Brand
UCI Cyclo-cross World Cup Besançon, Lucinda Brand
Cyclo-cross Superprestige De Schorre Boom, Lucinda Brand
UCI Cyclo-cross World Cup Namur, Lucinda Brand
