= 2011–12 Cyclo-cross Gazet van Antwerpen =

The Gazet van Antwerpen Trophy Cyclo cross 2011-2012 started November 1 with de Koppenbergcross and ended February 19. Kevin Pauwels won and received a prize of 26,000 euro.

Date	Location	Winner	Second	Third
November 1	Oudenaarde - Grand Prix Willy Naessens	(Belgium) Kevin Pauwels	(Belgium) Sven Nys	(Czech Republic) Zdeněk Štybar
November 6	Ronse - Super Trophy Cross Ronse	(Belgium) Kevin Pauwels	(Czech Republic) Zdeněk Štybar	(Belgium) Niels Albert
November 19	Hasselt - Grand Prix van Hasselt	(Belgium) Kevin Pauwels	(Czech Republic) Zdeněk Štybar	(Belgium) Sven Nys
December 17	Essen - Grand Prix Rouwmoer	(Belgium) Bart Wellens	(Belgium) Niels Albert	(Belgium) Rob Peeters
December 28	Loenhout - Azencross	(Belgium) Niels Albert	(Czech Republic) Zdeněk Štybar	(Belgium) Sven Nys
January 1	Baal - GP Sven Nys	(Belgium) Sven Nys	(Belgium) Kevin Pauwels	(Belgium) Bart Wellens
February 4	Lille - Krawatencross	(Belgium) Tom Meeusen	(Czech Republic) Zdeněk Štybar	(Belgium) Kevin Pauwels
February 19	Oostmalle - Sluitingsprijs Oostmalle	(Belgium) Niels Albert	(Czech Republic) Zdeněk Štybar	(Belgium) Kevin Pauwels

== Ranking (top 10) ==
Nr.	Name	Points
1	(Belgium) Kevin Pauwels	176
2	(Czech Republic) Zdeněk Štybar	166
3	(Belgium) Sven Nys	141
4	(Belgium) Niels Albert	139
5	(Belgium) Tom Meeusen	114
6	(Belgium) Bart Aernouts	87
7	(Belgium) Bart Wellens	85
8	(Belgium) Sven Vanthourenhout	83
9	(Belgium) Rob Peeters	80
10	(Belgium) Klaas Vantornout	80

== Results ==
GvA nr. 1 Koppenberg

Nr.	Name	Time
1	(Belgium) Kevin Pauwels	1:00.38
2	(Belgium) Sven Nys	+ 0.31
3	(Czech Republic) Zdeněk Štybar	+ 1.11
4	(Belgium) Bart Aernouts	+ 1.13
5	(Belgium) Tom Meeusen	+ 1.24
6	(Belgium) Klaas Vantornout	+ 1.25
7	(Belgium) Niels Albert	+ 2.06
8	(Czech Republic) Radomír Šimůnek, Jr.	+ 2.41
9	(Belgium) Vincent Baestaens	zt
10	(Belgium) Joeri Adams	+ 2.54

GvA nr. 2 Ronse

Nr.	Name	Time
1	(Belgium) Kevin Pauwels	1:01.12
2	(Belgium) Zdeněk Štybar	+ 0.01
3	(Belgium) Niels Albert	+ 0.20
4	(Belgium) Tom Meeusen	+ 0.53
5	(Belgium) Klaas Vantornout	+ 1.01
6	(Belgium) Bart Aernouts	+ 1.11
7	(Belgium) Sven Nys	+ 1.39
8	(Germany) Marcel Meisen	+ 1.44
9	(Belgium) Joeri Adams	+ 1.51
10	(Poland) Mariusz Gil	+ 2.08

GvA nr. 3 Hasselt

Nr.	Name	Time
1	(Belgium) Kevin Pauwels	0:59.39
2	(Czech Republic) Zdeněk Štybar	zt
3	(Belgium) Sven Nys	+ 0.01
4	(Belgium) Tom Meeusen	+ 0.10
5	(Belgium) Dieter Vanthourenhout	+ 0.28
6	(Belgium) Klaas Vantornout	+ 0.34
7	(Belgium) Bart Aernouts	zt
8	(Poland) Mariusz Gil	+ 0.43
9	(Belgium) Bart Wellens	+ 0.55
10	(Belgium) Vincent Baestaens	+ 1.00

GvA nr. 4 Essen

Nr.	Name	Time
1	(Belgium) Bart Wellens	59'04"
2	(Belgium) Niels Albert	+ 25"
3	(Belgium) Rob Peeters	+ 39"
4	(Belgium) Kevin Pauwels	+ 1'05"
5	(Belgium) Tom Meeusen	+ 1'12"
6	(Belgium) Jan Denuwelaere	+ 1'18"
7	(Czech Republic) Martin Zlámalík	+ 1'34"
8	(Belgium) Bart Aernouts	+ 1'40"
9	(Netherlands) Gerben de Knegt	+ 1'46"
10	(Belgium) Sven Vanthourenhout	+ 2'33"

GvA nr. 5 Loenhout

Nr.	Name	Time
1	(Belgium) Niels Albert	58'11"
2	(Czech Republic) Zdeněk Štybar	+ 16"
3	(Belgium) Sven Nys	+ 20"
4	(Belgium) Rob Peeters	+ 27"
5	(Belgium) Bart Wellens	+ 40"
6	(Belgium) Kevin Pauwels	+ 1'13"
7	(Belgium) Sven Vanthourenhout	+ 1'21"
8	(Belgium) Dieter Vanthourenhout	+ 1'33"
9	(Netherlands) Lars Boom	+ 1'39"
10	(France) Aurélien Duval	+ 1'46"

GvA nr. 6 Baal

Nr.	Name	Time
1	(Belgium) Sven Nys	1:00'13"
2	(Belgium) Kevin Pauwels	+ 46"
3	(Belgium) Bart Wellens	+ 1'10"
4	(Czech Republic) Zdeněk Štybar	+ 1'30"
5	(Belgium) Rob Peeters	+ 1'40"
6	(Belgium) Niels Albert	+ 1'46"
7	(Belgium) Sven Vanthourenhout	+ 1'50"
8	(Belgium) Bart Aernouts	+ 2'16"
9	(Belgium) Klaas Vantornout	+ 2'39"
10	(United States) Jonathan Page	+ 2'44"

GvA nr. 7 Lille

Nr.	Name	Time
1	(Belgium) Tom Meeusen	1:02'07"
2	(Czech Republic) Zdeněk Štybar	zt
3	(Belgium) Kevin Pauwels	zt
4	(Belgium) Sven Nys	zt
5	(Belgium) Niels Albert	zt
6	(Czech Republic) Radomír Šimůnek, Jr.	+ 02"
7	(Germany) Marcel Meisen	+ 02"
8	(Belgium) Sven Vanthourenhout	+ 03"
9	(Belgium) Vincent Baestaens	+ 09"
10	(France) Francis Mourey	+ 10

GvA nr. 8 Oostmalle

Nr.	Name	Time
1	(Belgium) Niels Albert	58'38"
2	(Czech Republic) Zdeněk Štybar	+ 15"
3	(Belgium) Kevin Pauwels	+ 24"
4	(Belgium) Sven Nys	+ 46"
5	(Belgium) Tom Meeusen	+ 50"
6	(Belgium) Bart Aernouts	+ 50"
7	(Czech Republic) Radomír Šimůnek, Jr.	+ 50"
8	(Belgium) Rob Peeters	+ 50"
9	(Belgium) Dieter Vanthourenhout	+ 59"
10	(Belgium) Sven Vanthourenhout	+ 1'14"
