= 2012–13 Cyclo-cross bpost bank trophy =

2012–2013 Cyclo-cross BPost Bank Trophy
Details
- Dates: 14 October 2012 – 24 February 2013
- Location: Belgium
- Races: 8

Champions
- Male individual champion: Niels Albert (BEL)
- Female individual champion: Sanne Cant (BEL)

The BPost Bank Trophy 2012-2013 began on October 14 with the GP Mario De Clercq and finished on February 24 in Oostmalle. The men's elite competition was won by the Belgian Niels Albert while the women's elite was won by Sanne Cant, also of Belgium. The bank of the Belgian Post Group took over the sponsorship of this event, formerly known as Gazet van Antwerpen trofee.

Since this season, the ranking is no longer decided by points classification, but by time difference. This is a method well known from road racing. All riders that do not start in a race, do not finish the race or finish more than 5 minutes behind the winner receive 5 minutes delay on the winner in the ranking and are still in the race for the overall title. Time bonuses can be earned: during each race there is a sprint in which the first three riders gain 15, 10 and 5 seconds respectively. The same time bonuses are given at the finish.

== Calendar ==
Date	Race	Location	Winner	Second	Third	Classification leader
14 October	Super Trophy Cross Ronse	Ronse	Niels Albert (BEL)	Kevin Pauwels (BEL)	Sven Nys (BEL)	Kevin Pauwels (BEL)
1 November	GP Willy Naessens	Koppenberg	Sven Nys (BEL)	Niels Albert (BEL)	Klaas Vantornout (BEL)	Niels Albert (BEL)
17 November	Grand Prix van Hasselt	Hasselt	Sven Nys (BEL)	Niels Albert (BEL)	Kevin Pauwels (BEL)	Niels Albert (BEL)
22 December	Grand Prix Rouwmoer	Essen	Jan Denuwelaere (BEL)	Rob Peeters (BEL)	Niels Albert (BEL)	Niels Albert (BEL)
28 December	Azencross	Loenhout	Niels Albert (BEL)	Zdeněk Štybar (CZE)	Kevin Pauwels (BEL)	Niels Albert (BEL)
1 January	Grand Prix Sven Nys	Baal	Kevin Pauwels (BEL)	Zdeněk Štybar (CZE)	Niels Albert (BEL)	Niels Albert (BEL)
9 February	Krawatencross	Lille	Niels Albert (BEL)	Klaas Vantornout (BEL)	Sven Nys (BEL)	Niels Albert (BEL)
24 February	Sluitingsprijs Oostmalle	Oostmalle	Niels Albert (BEL)	Klaas Vantornout (BEL)	Jim Aernouts (BEL)	Niels Albert (BEL)

== Ranking (top 10) ==
	Rider	Team	Time
1	Niels Albert (BEL)	BKCP-Powerplus	7h 49' 53"
2	Klaas Vantornout (BEL)	Sunweb-Revor	+ 7' 53"
3	Kevin Pauwels (BEL)	Sunweb-Revor	+ 10' 42"
4	Rob Peeters (BEL)	Telenet-Fidea	+ 10' 54"
5	Bart Wellens (BEL)	Telenet-Fidea	+ 12' 48"
6	Sven Nys (BEL)	Landbouwkrediet–Euphony	+ 12' 56"
7	Thijs van Amerongen (NED)	AA Drink	+ 14' 37"
8	Bart Aernouts (BEL)	AA Drink	+ 16' 43"
9	Jan Denuwelaere (BEL)	Style & Concept	+ 20' 42"
10	Philipp Walsleben (GER)	BKCP-Powerplus	+ 20' 50"

== Results ==
=== Ronse ===
	Rider	Team	Time	Bonus
1	Niels Albert (BEL)	BKCP-Powerplus	57' 31"	20"
2	Kevin Pauwels (BEL)	Sunweb-Revor	+ 4"	25"
3	Sven Nys (BEL)	Landbouwkrediet–Euphony	+ 1' 09"	5"
4	Bart Aernouts (BEL)	AA Drink	+ 1' 22"	
5	Klaas Vantornout (BEL)	Sunweb-Revor	+ 1' 52"	
6	Thijs van Amerongen (NED)	AA Drink	+ 1' 58"	10"
7	Bart Wellens (BEL)	Telenet-Fidea	+ 2' 07"	
8	Lars van der Haar (BEL)	Rabobank-Giant	+ 2' 38"	
9	Philipp Walsleben (DEU)	BKCP-Powerplus	+ 2' 52"	
10	Rob Peeters (BEL)	Telenet-Fidea	+ 2' 57"	

=== Oudenaarde ===
	Rider	Team	Time	Bonus
1	Sven Nys (BEL)	Landbouwkrediet–Euphony	1h 00' 31"	30"
2	Niels Albert (BEL)	BKCP-Powerplus	+ 14"	15"
3	Klaas Vantornout (BEL)	Sunweb-Revor	+ 1' 04"	5"
4	Aurélien Duval (FRA)	UV Aube	+ 1' 15"	
5	Bart Wellens (BEL)	Telenet-Fidea	+ 1' 22"	
6	Rob Peeters (BEL)	Telenet-Fidea	+ 1' 25"	
7	Thijs van Amerongen (NED)	AA Drink	+ 1' 29"	
8	Julien Taramarcaz (SUI)	BMC Mountainbike Racing	+ 1' 31"	
9	Bart Aernouts (BEL)	AA Drink	+ 1' 49"	
10	Twan van den Brand (NED)	Orange Babies	+ 2' 10"	

=== Hasselt ===
	Rider	Team	Time	Bonus
1	Sven Nys (BEL)	Landbouwkrediet–Euphony	54' 40"	30"
2	Niels Albert (BEL)	BKCP-Powerplus	+ 14"	10"
3	Kevin Pauwels (BEL)	Sunweb-Revor	+ 30"	5"
4	Klaas Vantornout (BEL)	Sunweb-Revor	+ 36"	5"
5	Dieter Vanthourenhout (BEL)	BKCP-Powerplus	+ 38"	
6	Bart Wellens (BEL)	Telenet-Fidea	+ 40"	
7	Bart Aernouts (BEL)	AA Drink	+ 49"	
8	Rob Peeters (BEL)	Telenet-Fidea	+ 52"	10"
9	Radomír Šimůnek (CZE)	BKCP-Powerplus	+ 1' 14"	
10	Jim Aernouts (BEL)	Sunweb-Revor	+ 1' 21"	

=== Essen ===
	Rider	Team	Time	Bonus
1	Jan Denuwelaere (BEL)	Style & Concept	1h 00' 05"	15"
2	Rob Peeters (BEL)	Telenet-Fidea	s.t.	10"
3	Niels Albert (BEL)	BKCP-Powerplus	+ 1"	15"
4	Zdeněk Štybar (Note: Zdeněk Štybar passed the line first, after pushing Denuwelaere into the barriers during the sprint. Denuwelaere slid over the finish line as second. Štybar was relegated to the fourth position for his action.) (CZE)	Omega Pharma–Quick-Step	+ 1"	5"
5	Sven Nys (BEL)	Landbouwkrediet–Euphony	+ 32"	15"
6	Klaas Vantornout (BEL)	Sunweb-Revor	+ 55"	
7	Thijs van Amerongen (NED)	AA Drink	+ 1' 04"	
8	Kevin Pauwels (BEL)	Sunweb-Revor	+ 1' 04"	
9	Bart Wellens (BEL)	Telenet-Fidea	+ 1' 42"	
10	Tom Meeusen (BEL)	Telenet-Fidea	+ 1' 46"	

=== Loenhout ===
	Rider	Team	Time	Bonus
1	Niels Albert (BEL)	BKCP-Powerplus	57' 36"	30"
2	Zdeněk Štybar (CZE)	Omega Pharma–Quick-Step	+ 16"	15"
3	Kevin Pauwels (BEL)	Sunweb-Revor	+ 56"	5"
4	Klaas Vantornout (BEL)	Sunweb-Revor	+ 1' 01"	10"
5	Rob Peeters (BEL)	Telenet-Fidea	+ 1' 32"	
6	Thijs van Amerongen (NED)	AA Drink	+ 1' 47"	
7	Jan Denuwelaere (BEL)	Style & Concept	+ 1' 58"	
8	Philipp Walsleben (DEU)	BKCP-Powerplus	+ 2' 00"	
9	Bart Wellens (BEL)	Telenet-Fidea	+ 2' 04"	
10	Radomír Šimůnek (CZE)	BKCP-Powerplus	+ 2' 21"	

=== Baal ===
	Rider	Team	Time	Bonus
1	Kevin Pauwels (BEL)	Sunweb-Revor	1h 01' 00"	15"
2	Zdeněk Štybar (CZE)	Omega Pharma–Quick-Step	+ 1' 09"	20"
3	Niels Albert (BEL)	BKCP-Powerplus	+ 1' 20"	5"
4	Rob Peeters (BEL)	Telenet-Fidea	+ 1' 29"	
5	Klaas Vantornout (BEL)	Sunweb-Revor	+ 1' 35"	15"
6	Thijs van Amerongen (NED)	AA Drink	+ 1' 44"	
7	Bart Wellens (BEL)	Telenet-Fidea	+ 2' 24"	
8	Bart Aernouts (BEL)	AA Drink	+ 2' 28"	
9	Jonathan Page (USA)	Planet Bike	+ 2' 35"	
10	Radomír Šimůnek (CZE)	BKCP-Powerplus	+ 2' 42"	

=== Lille ===
	Rider	Team	Time	Bonus
1	Niels Albert (BEL)	BKCP-Powerplus	58' 46"	30"
2	Klaas Vantornout (BEL)	Sunweb-Revor	+ 49"	10"
3	Sven Nys (BEL)	Crelan–Euphony	s.t.	5"
4	Kevin Pauwels (BEL)	Sunweb-Revor	s.t.	
5	Rob Peeters (BEL)	Telenet-Fidea	+ 53"	
6	Bart Wellens (BEL)	Telenet-Fidea	+ 1' 05"	
7	Philipp Walsleben (DEU)	BKCP-Powerplus	+ 1' 24"	5"
8	Dieter Vanthourenhout (BEL)	BKCP-Powerplus	+ 1' 28"	
9	Bart Aernouts (BEL)	AA Drink	+ 1' 42"	
10	Marcel Meisen (DEU)		+ 2' 10"	
