= Grote Prijs Stad Eeklo =

Cyclo-cross race in Belgium

Race details
- Region: Eeklo, Belgium
- English name: Grand Prix City Eeklo
- Nickname: GP Eecloonaar
- Discipline: Cyclo-cross
- Organiser: Wielerclub Sportvrienden Eeklo
- Web site: www.sportvriendeneeklo.be

History
- First edition: 1996
- First winner: Mario Lammens (BEL)
- Most wins: Sven Nys (BEL) (6 wins)
- Most recent: Quinten Hermans (BEL)

The Grote Prijs Stad Eeklo is a cyclo-cross race in Eeklo, Belgium organised since 1996 by Wielerclub Sportvrienden Eeklo.

== Results ==
Year	Winner	Second	Third
2021	(Belgium) Quinten Hermans	(Belgium) Toon Aerts	(Belgium) Eli Iserbyt
2019	(Belgium) Laurens Sweeck	(Belgium) Eli Iserbyt	(Belgium) Quinten Hermans
2017	(Netherlands) Mathieu van der Poel	(Belgium) Wout van Aert	(Belgium) Michael Vanthourenhout
2016	(Belgium) Wout Van Aert	(Belgium) Toon Aerts	(Belgium) Michael Vanthourenhout
2015	(Belgium) Wout Van Aert	(Belgium) Kevin Pauwels	(Belgium) Michael Vanthourenhout
2014	(Belgium) Tom Meeusen	(Belgium) Michael Vanthourenhout	(Belgium) Wout Van Aert
2013	(Belgium) Sven Nys	(Germany) Marcel Meisen	(Czech Republic) Martin Bína
2012	(Belgium) Sven Nys	(Belgium) Tom Meeusen	(Germany) Marcel Meisen
2011	(Belgium) Klaas Vantornout	(Czech Republic) Zdeněk Štybar	(Belgium) Dieter Vanthourenhout
2010	(Belgium) Bart Wellens	(Belgium) Dieter Vanthourenhout	(Belgium) Sven Nys
2009	(Belgium) Niels Albert	(Belgium) Klaas Vantornout	(Belgium) Sven Nys
2008	(Belgium) Klaas Vantornout	(Belgium) Bart Wellens	(Belgium) Niels Albert
2007	(Belgium) Sven Nys	(Belgium) Niels Albert	(Netherlands) Lars Boom
2006	(Belgium) Sven Nys	(Belgium) Niels Albert	(Belgium) Bart Wellens
2005	(Belgium) Sven Vanthourenhout	(Belgium) Sven Nys	(Netherlands) Richard Groenendaal
2004	(Belgium) Sven Nys	(Belgium) Sven Vanthourenhout	(Belgium) Mario De Clercq
2003	(Belgium) Bart Wellens	(Belgium) Sven Nys	(Belgium) Ben Berden
2002	(Belgium) Mario De Clercq	(Belgium) Bart Wellens	(Belgium) Sven Vanthourenhout
2001	(Belgium) Bart Wellens	(Belgium) Mario De Clercq	(Belgium) Peter Van Santvliet
2000	(Belgium) Mario De Clercq	(Belgium) Sven Nys	(Belgium) Ben Berden
1999	(Belgium) Sven Nys	(Belgium) Bart Wellens	(Belgium) Ben Berden
1998	(Belgium) Bart Wellens	(Belgium) Sven Nys	(Belgium) Mario De Clercq
1997	(Belgium) Arne Daelmans	(Belgium) Paul Herygers	(Belgium) Bart Wellens
1996	(Belgium) Mario Lammens	(Belgium) Paul Herygers	(Belgium) Peter Van Den Abeele
