= Kevin Pauwels =

Belgian cyclist (born 1984)

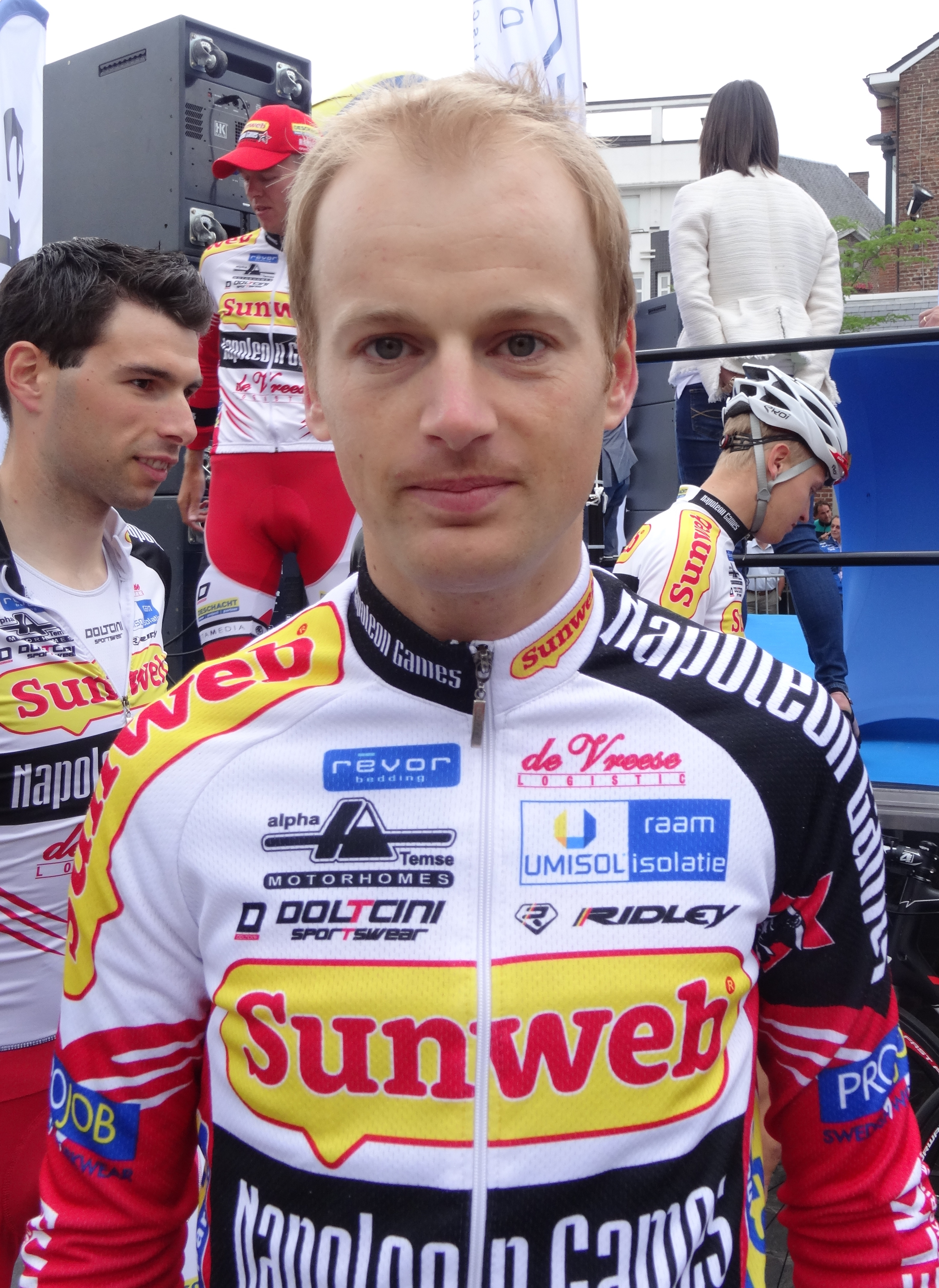
- Pauwels in 2014.

Personal information
- Full name: Kevin Pauwels
- Born: 12 April 1984 (age 42) Ekeren, Belgium
- Height: 1.75 m (5 ft 9 in)
- Weight: 60 kg (132 lb)

Cycling career
- Sport: Cycling
- Disciplines: Cyclo-cross; Mountain biking; Road
- Role: Rider

Professional teams
- 2004–2011: Spaarselect
- 2011–2019: Sunweb–Revor

Major wins
- Cyclo-cross World Cup (2011–12, 2014–15) 11 individual wins (2009–10—2012–13, 2014–15) Trophy (2011–12) Mountain bike National Championships (2011, 2012)
Medal record
Representing Belgium
Men's cyclo-cross
World Championships
Bronze medal – third place	2011 Sankt Wendel	Elite
Bronze medal – third place	2012 Koksijde	Elite
Bronze medal – third place	2014 Hoogerheide	Elite
Bronze medal – third place	2016 Heusden-Zolder	Elite
Bronze medal – third place	2017 Bieles	Elite
Gold medal – first place	2004 Pont-Château	Under-23
Gold medal – first place	2002 Zolder	Junior

Kevin Pauwels (born 12 April 1984 in Ekeren) is a Belgian former professional racing cyclist, who rode professionally between 2004 and 2019 for the Fidea and Pauwels Sauzen–Bingoal teams. Pauwels retired on 24 February 2019 after winning the Sluitingsprijs Oostmalle.

Pauwels' elder brother, Tim Pauwels was also a professional cyclo-cross racer but died during a race in Erpe-Mere in 2004.

== Major results ==
=== Road ===
2002
3rd Road race, National Junior Championships
2006
1st Stage 4 Spar Arden Challenge
1st Stage 5 Tour de Liège
2007
1st Stage 1 Volta a Lleida
3rd Derny, Brasschaat
2008
1st Stage 2 Volta a Lleida
2010
1st Stage 2 Flèche du Sud
1st Stage 4 Tour de Serbie
2011
1st Stage 3 Kreiz Breizh Elites
2015
7th Overall Flèche du Sud
2018
5th Dwars door de Vlaamse Ardennen

=== Mountain bike ===
2011
1st Cross-country, National Championships
2012
1st Cross-country, National Championships
2013
1st Landgraaf
2nd Sankt Vith
2017
1st Kluisbergen
3rd Cross-country, National Championships

=== Cyclo-cross ===
2000–2001
3rd National Junior Championships
2001–2002
1st UCI World Junior Championships
1st National Junior Championships
1st Overall Junior Superprestige

1st Ruddervoorde
1st Sint-Michielsgestel
1st Gieten
1st Vorselaar

2003–2004
1st UCI World Under-23 Championships
Under-23 Superprestige

2nd Hoogstraten
3rd Vorselaar

3rd Overall Under-23 Gazet van Antwerpen

3rd Koppenberg

2004–2005
1st Overall Under-23 Gazet van Antwerpen

1st Loenhout
3rd Koppenberg

2nd Kalmthout
Under-23 Superprestige

2nd Gavere
2nd Hoogstraten

3rd National Under-23 Championships
3rd Under-23 Milan
Under-23 UCI World Cup

3rd Wetzikon
3rd Nommay

2005–2006
1st Overall Under-23 UCI World Cup

1st Wetzikon
1st Liévin
2nd Kalmthout

1st Under-23 Hofstade
1st Under-23 Hasselt
2nd Overall Under-23 Gazet van Antwerpen

2nd Lille

Under-23 Superprestige

2nd Gavere
2nd Gieten
2nd Ruddervoorde
3rd Sint-Michielsgestel
3rd Vorselaar

2nd National Under-23 Championships
2nd Under-23 Pijnacker
2006–2007
Superprestige

2nd Sint-Michielsgestel
3rd Diegem

2007–2008
2nd Huijbergen
Gazet van Antwerpen

3rd Baal

2008–2009
1st Overijse
UCI World Cup

2nd Heusden-Zolder
3rd Kalmthout

Gazet van Antwerpen

2nd Hasselt

2nd Harderwijk
3rd National Championships
2009–2010
UCI World Cup

1st Heusden-Zolder
3rd Hoogerheide

2nd Overijse
2nd Maldegem
2nd Erpe-Mere
Gazet van Antwerpen

2nd Hasselt
3rd Lille
3rd Oostmalle

Superprestige

2nd Gieten
3rd Diegem
3rd Zonhoven

3rd Tervuren
2010–2011
1st Heerlen
2nd Overall UCI World Cup

1st Pont-Château
2nd Plzeň
2nd Hoogerheide
3rd Aigle
3rd Kalmthout

2nd Overijse
2nd Asteasu
2nd Overall Superprestige

2nd Zonhoven
2nd Gavere
2nd Middelkerke
3rd Hoogstraten

3rd UCI World Championships
3rd National Championships
3rd Erpe-Mere
3rd Overall Gazet van Antwerpen

1st Hasselt
1st Lille
3rd Namur
3rd Koppenberg
3rd Essen

2011–2012
1st Overall UCI World Cup

1st Tábor
1st Igorre
1st Heusden-Zolder
1st Hoogerheide
2nd Koksijde
2nd Liévin
2nd Plzeň

1st Overall Gazet van Antwerpen

1st Koppenberg
1st Ronse
1st Hasselt
2nd Baal
3rd Lille
3rd Oostmalle

1st Otegem
1st Erpe-Mere
1st Heerlen
2nd Overall Superprestige

1st Gavere
2nd Hamme
2nd Gieten
2nd Diegem
2nd Hoogstraten
3rd Zonhoven

2nd Maldegem
2nd Neerpelt
3rd UCI World Championships
3rd Niel
2012–2013
1st Scheldecross
2nd Overall UCI World Cup

1st Tábor
1st Namur
1st Rome
2nd Roubaix
3rd Plzeň

Soudal Classics

2nd Leuven

3rd Overall Bpost Bank Trophy

1st Baal
2nd Ronse
3rd Hasselt
3rd Loenhout

Superprestige

2nd Diegem
3rd Ruddervoorde
3rd Gieten
3rd Hoogstraten

3rd National Championships
2013–2014
1st Kalmthout
Bpost Bank Trophy

1st Essen
2nd Koppenberg
3rd Oostmalle

UCI World Cup

2nd Cauberg
3rd Tábor

Superprestige

2nd Middelkerke

Soudal Classics

2nd Leuven

3rd UCI World Championships
3rd Overijse
2014–2015
1st Overall UCI World Cup

1st Milton Keynes
1st Namur
2nd Cauberg
2nd Koksijde
2nd Heusden-Zolder

1st Otegem
1st Maldegem
2nd Oostmalle
2nd Eeklo
2nd Sint-Niklaas
2nd Overall Superprestige

1st Zonhoven
1st Spa-Francorchamps
1st Middelkerke
2nd Gavere
2nd Hoogstraten
3rd Diegem

2nd Overall Bpost Bank Trophy

1st Hasselt
3rd Koppenberg
3rd Baal

Soudal Classics

3rd Niel
3rd Leuven
3rd Mechelen

2015–2016
Superprestige

1st Ruddervoorde
2nd Diegem
3rd Zonhoven
3rd Gavere
3rd Spa-Francorchamps

Soudal Classics

1st Niel
2nd Neerpelt
3rd Hasselt

1st Oostmalle
2nd Overall BPost Bank Trophy

2nd Koppenberg
2nd Ronse
3rd Hamme

2nd Overijse
2nd Maldegem
3rd UCI World Championships
3rd UEC European Championships
3rd Otegem
3rd Overall UCI World Cup

2nd Heusden-Zolder
3rd Namur
3rd Hoogerheide

2016–2017
2nd National Championships
2nd Overall UCI World Cup

2nd Iowa City
3rd Namur
3rd Zeven
3rd Heusden-Zolder

2nd Overall DVV Trophy

2nd Koppenberg
2nd Essen
3rd Antwerpen
3rd Loenhout

Soudal Classics

2nd Niel
2nd Leuven

3rd UCI World Championships
3rd Overijse
Superprestige

3rd Diegem
3rd Hoogstraten

2018–2019
1st Hasselt
1st Zonnebeke
1st Oostmalle
