= Jan Denuwelaere =

Belgian cyclist (born 1988)

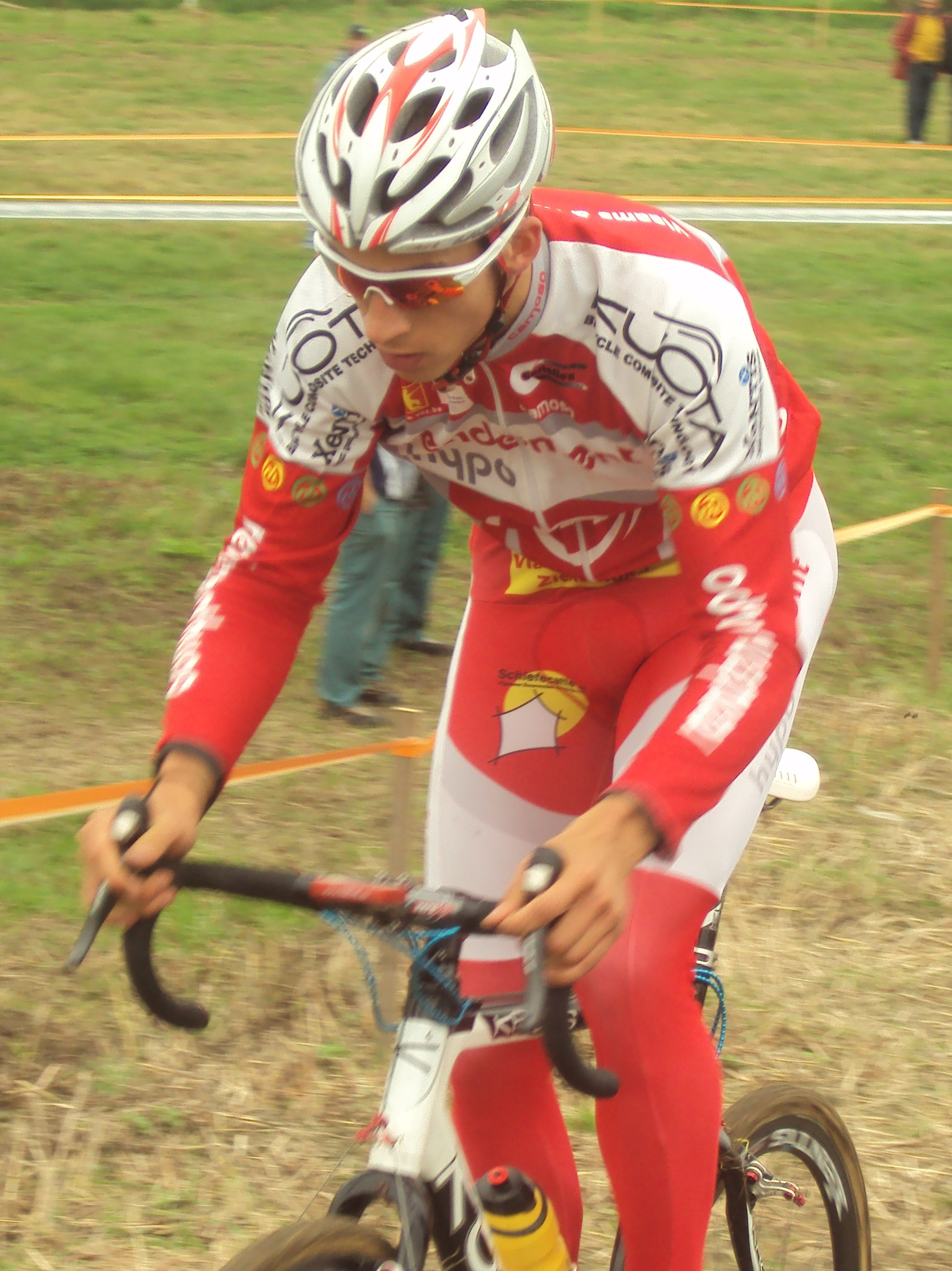
- Denuwelaere at the Ardooie cyclo-cross in 2009

Personal information
- Born: 9 April 1988 (age 38) Poperinge, Belgium

Cycling career
- Sport: Cycling
- Current team: Retired
- Discipline: Cyclo-cross
- Role: Rider

Amateur teams
- 2009: Rendement Hypo
- 2010–2013: Style & Concept
- 2016–2017: Mahieu Construct–Kona–360-sports.be

Professional team
- 2014–2016: Vastgoedservice–Golden Palace

Jan Denuwelaere (born 9 April 1988) is a Belgian former professional cyclo-cross cyclist.

== Major results ==
2008–2009
1st Kasteelcross Zonnebeke
GvA Trophy Under-23

1st Krawatencross

Under-23 Superprestige

2nd Hoogstraten

2009–2010
Under-23 Superprestige

1st Zonhoven
3rd Diegem

2nd National Under-23 Championships
GvA Trophy Under-23

2nd Koppenbergcross
3rd Grand Prix Sven Nys
3rd Krawatencross

2010–2011
1st Silvestercyclocross
2nd Grand-Prix de la Commune de Contern
3rd Cyclo-cross Nommay
2011–2012
1st Versluys
Toi Toi Cup

2nd Stříbro

3rd Grand-Prix de la Commune de Contern
2012–2013
BPost Bank Trophy

1st Essen

2nd Grand-Prix de la Commune de Contern
