= Cyclocross Leuven =

Belgian cyclocross race

- 2021 logo

Race details
- Date: December, January
- Region: Leuven, Belgium
- Discipline: Cyclo-cross

History
- First edition: 2011
- Editions: 11 (as of 2021)
- First winner: Sven Nys (BEL)
- Most wins: Toon Aerts (BEL) 3 wins
- Most recent: Laurens Sweeck (BEL)

History (women)
- First winner: Marianne Vos (NED)
- Most wins: Marianne Vos (NED) 2 wins
- Most recent: Anna Kay (GBR)

The Cyclocross Leuven is a cyclo-cross race held in Leuven, Belgium. It was first held on 30 December 2011 as a part of the Fidea Classics, replacing the Cyclocross Tervuren. Since the 2012–2013 season, it is part of the SOUDAL Classics. The track is located on the military domain next to the Hertogstraat in Heverlee, a deelgemeente of Leuven.

== Podiums ==
=== Men ===
Year	Winner	2nd	3rd
2021	Laurens Sweeck (BEL)	Tom Meeusen (BEL)	Felipe Orts (ESP)
Nov. 2020	Laurens Sweeck (BEL)	Toon Aerts (BEL)	Michael Vanthourenhout (BEL)
Feb. 2020	Toon Aerts (BEL)	Michael Vanthourenhout (BEL)	Lars van der Haar (NED)
2019	Toon Aerts (BEL)	Tom Meeusen (BEL)	Lars van der Haar (NED)
2018	Corné van Kessel (NED)	Clément Venturini (FRA)	Michael Vanthourenhout (BEL)
2017	Mathieu van der Poel (NED)	Kevin Pauwels (BEL)	Laurens Sweeck (BEL)
2016	Toon Aerts (BEL)	Tom Meeusen (BEL)	Vincent Baestaens (BEL)
2015	Mathieu van der Poel (NED)	Tom Meeusen (BEL)	Kevin Pauwels (BEL)
2014	Sven Nys (BEL)	Kevin Pauwels (BEL)	Tom Meeusen (BEL)
2012	Niels Albert (BEL)	Kevin Pauwels (BEL)	Sven Nys (BEL)
2011	Sven Nys (BEL)	Rob Peeters (BEL)	Francis Mourey (FRA)

=== Women ===
Year	Winner	2nd	3rd
2021	Anna Kay (GBR)	Ellen Van Loy (BEL)	Laura Verdonschot (BEL)
Nov. 2020	Ceylin del Carmen Alvarado (NED)	Denise Betsema (NED)	Lucinda Brand (NED)
Feb. 2020	Denise Betsema (NED)	Annemarie Worst (NED)	Sanne Cant (BEL)
2019	~~Denise Betsema (NED)~~	Loes Sels (BEL)	Annemarie Worst (NED)
2018	Loes Sels (BEL)	Thalita de Jong (NED)	Ceylin del Carmen Alvarado (NED)
2017	Katie Compton (USA)	Sophie de Boer (NED)	Ellen Van Loy (BEL)
2016	Sophie de Boer (NED)	Sanne Cant (BEL)	Ellen Van Loy (BEL)
2015	Sabrina Stultiens (NED)	Ellen Van Loy (BEL)	Jolien Verschueren (BEL)
2014	Marianne Vos (NED)	Sanne Cant (BEL)	Nikki Harris (GBR)
2012	Sanne Cant (BEL)	Amy Dombroski (USA)	Ellen Van Loy (BEL)
2011	Marianne Vos (NED)	Daphny van den Brand (NED)	Sophie de Boer (NED)
