= Grand Prix Neerpelt =

Grote Prijs Neerpelt
Race details
- Date: September
- Region: Neerpelt, Belgium
- English name: Grand Prix Neerpelt
- Discipline: Cyclo-cross
- Web site: www.sport.be/cyclocrossclassics/1415/neerpelt/nl/

History
- First edition: 2005
- Editions: 15 (as of 2019)
- First winner: Bart Wellens (BEL)
- Most wins: Sven Nys (BEL) (6 wins)
- Most recent: Laurens Sweeck (BEL)

The Grote Prijs Neerpelt is a cyclo-cross race held in Neerpelt, Belgium. In the 2010–2011 and 2011–2012 seasons, it was part of the Fidea Cyclocross Classics, a season long competition (without points) which ceased to exist after the 2011–2012 season. The GP Neerpelt is since the 2012–2013 season part of the SOUDAL Classics.

== Winners ==
=== Men ===
Year	Winner	2nd	3rd
2019	Laurens Sweeck (BEL)	Quinten Hermans (BEL)	Lars van der Haar (NED)
2018	Laurens Sweeck (BEL)	Marcel Meisen (GER)	David van der Poel (NED)
2017	Laurens Sweeck (BEL)	Quinten Hermans (BEL)	Jens Adams (BEL)
2016	Laurens Sweeck (BEL)	Jens Adams (BEL)	Michael Vanthourenhout (BEL)
2015	Wout Van Aert (BEL)	Kevin Pauwels (BEL)	Laurens Sweeck (BEL)
2014	Sven Nys (BEL)	Klaas Vantornout (BEL)	Lars van der Haar (NED)
2013	Niels Albert (BEL)	Sven Nys (BEL)	Philipp Walsleben (GER)
2012	Sven Nys (BEL)	Niels Albert (BEL)	Klaas Vantornout (BEL)
2011	Sven Nys (BEL)	Kevin Pauwels (BEL)	Niels Albert (BEL)
2010	Sven Nys (BEL)	Klaas Vantornout (BEL)	Bart Aernouts (BEL)
2009	Niels Albert (BEL)	Zdenek Stybar (CZE)	Klaas Vantornout (BEL)
2008	Sven Nys (BEL)	Bart Wellens (BEL)	Zdenek Stybar (CZE)
2007	Sven Nys (BEL)	Niels Albert (BEL)	Bart Wellens (BEL)
2006	Niels Albert (BEL)	Bart Wellens (BEL)	Sven Nys (BEL)
2005	Bart Wellens (BEL)	Richard Groenendaal (NLD)	Wim Jacobs (BEL)

=== Women ===
Year	Winner	2nd	3rd
2019	Ceylin Del Carmen Alvarado (NED)	Yara Kastelijn (NED)	Shirin van Anrooij (NED)
2018	Denise Betsema (NED)	Ceylin Del Carmen Alvarado (NED)	Laura Verdonschot (BEL)
2017	Ellen Van Loy (BEL)	Nikki Brammeier (GBR)	Helen Wyman (GBR)
2016	Sophie de Boer (NED)	Laura Verdonschot (BEL)	Nikki Brammeier (GBR)
2015	Sanne van Paassen (NED)	Ellen Van Loy (BEL)	Jolien Verschueren (BEL)
2014	Sanne Cant (BEL)	Loes Sels (BEL)	Ellen Van Loy (BEL)
2013	Sanne Cant (BEL)	Sophie de Boer (NED)	Pavla Havlíková (CZE)
2012	Nikki Harris (GBR)	Pavla Havlíková (CZE)	Sanne Cant (BEL)
2011	Sanne van Paassen (NED)	Daphny van den Brand (NED)	Nikki Harris (GBR)
2010	Sanne van Paassen (NED)	Daphny van den Brand (NED)	Sanne Cant (BEL)
