= Rob Peeters =

Belgian racing cyclist

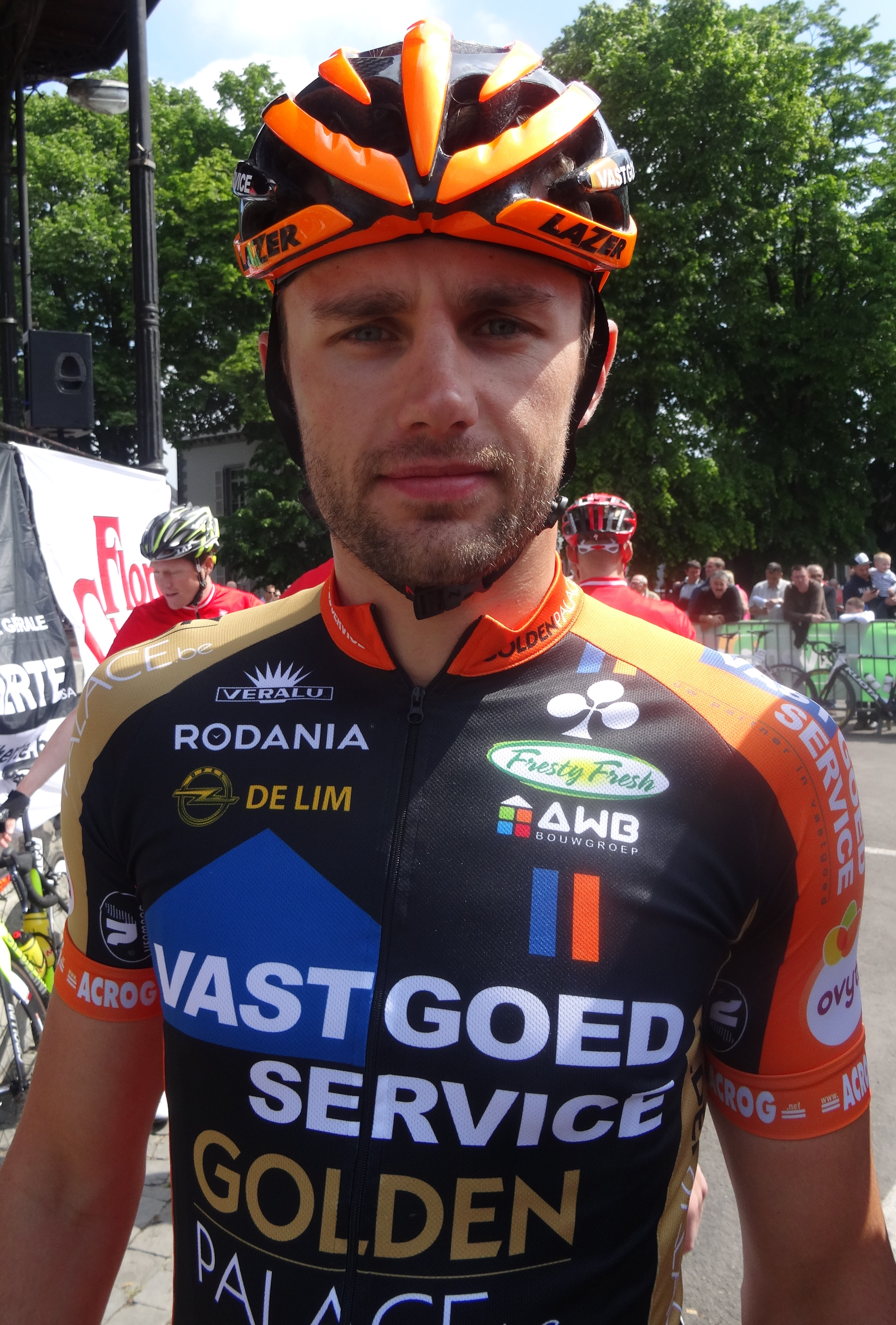
- Peeters in 2014

Personal information
- Full name: Rob Peeters
- Born: 2 July 1985 (age 41) Geel, Belgium
- Height: 1.86 m (6 ft 1 in)
- Weight: 75 kg (165 lb)

Cycling career
- Sport: Cycling
- Current team: Retired
- Disciplines: Cyclo-cross; Road
- Role: Rider

Professional teams
- 2007–2009: Landbouwkrediet–Tönissteiner
- 2009–2013: Telenet–Fidea
- 2014–2018: Vastgoedservice–Golden Palace
Medal record
Representing Belgium
Men's cyclo-cross
World Championships
Silver medal – second place	2012 Koksijde	Elite race

Rob Peeters (born 2 July 1985) is a Belgian former professional racing cyclist, who primarily competed in the cyclo-cross discipline of the sport. In January 2012, he finished second at the UCI Cyclo-cross World Championships. He also competed in road bicycle racing, winning the mountains classification at the 2015 Ster ZLM Toer.

== Personal life ==
His cousin Yannick Peeters and uncle Wilfried Peeters were also professional cyclists.

== Major results ==
2004–2005
3rd Hoogstraten, Under-23 Superprestige
2005–2006
3rd Hofstade, UCI Under-23 World Cup
3rd Grand Prix van Hasselt Under-23
3rd Koppenbergcross Under-23
2006–2007
1st Krawatencross Under-23
1st Herdenkingscross Under-23
2nd National Under-23 Championships
2nd Azencross Under-23
2nd Grand Prix van Hasselt Under-23
2nd Koppenbergcross Under-23
3rd European Under-23 Championships
3rd Overall Under-23 Superprestige

3rd Ruddervoorde
3rd Gavere
3rd Bollekescross
3rd Diegem
3rd Hoogstraten

UCI Under-23 Cyclo-cross World Cup

3rd Kalmthout
3rd Hofstade

2007–2008
1st Grand Prix de Ster
1st Grand Prix de Denain
2008–2009
2nd Grand Prix de la Région Wallonne
3rd Grand Prix van Hasselt
2009–2010
1st Lanarvily
1st Grand Prix DAF Grand Garage Engel
1st Rutland, National Trophy Series
2nd Centrumcross Surhuisterveen
2010–2011
1st Kasteelcross Zonnebeke
2nd Stříbro, Toi Toi Cup
3rd Grand Prix de la Commune de Contern
2011–2012
1st Kasteelcross Zonnebeke
2nd UCI World Championships
2nd Leuven
2nd Grand Prix de la Commune de Contern
2nd Rad Racing GP
3rd National Championships
3rd Gieten, Superprestige
3rd Grand Prix Rouwmoer, GvA Trophy
3rd CrossVegas
2012–2013
1st Centrumcross Surhuisterveen
2nd Essen, BPost Bank Trophy
2013–2014
2nd National Championships
2nd Azencross, BPost Bank Trophy
2nd Bredenecross
3rd Heerlen
3rd Otegem
3rd Jaarmarktcross Niel
3rd Cyclocross van het Waasland
2014–2015
3rd Otegem
3rd Essen
2015–2016
2nd Cyclo-cross Zonhoven, Superprestige
2nd Kasteelcross Zonnebeke
2016–2017
1st Qiansen Trophy Yanqing Station
2017–2018
2nd Rochester Cyclocross Day 1
3rd Rochester Cyclocross Day 2
