= Cyclo-cross Trophy =

Belgian cyclo-cross racing series

X²O Badkamers Trophy

Race details
- Region: Belgium
- Local name: Trofee veldrijden
- Discipline: Cyclo-cross
- Type: Series

History (men)
- First edition: 1987
- Editions: 39 (as of season 2025-26)
- First winner: Rudy De Bie (BEL)
- Most wins: Sven Nys (BEL) (9 wins)
- Most recent: Joris Nieuwenhuis (NED)

History (women)
- First edition: 2007
- Editions: 19 (as of season 2025-26)
- First winner: Daphny van den Brand (NED)
- Most wins: Sanne Cant (BEL) (6 wins)
- Most recent: Lucinda Brand (NED)

The Cyclo-cross Trophy (Dutch: Trofee veldrijden), also known as X²O Badkamers Trophy (Dutch: X²O Badkamers Trofee), is a Belgian cyclo-cross racing series currently sponsored by X²O Badkamers (X²O Bathrooms). It is one of the three major season-long competitions in Cyclo-cross, the other two being UCI Cyclo-cross World Cup and Cyclo-cross Superprestige. Many races are held in the province of Antwerp with others being held across Belgium.

== History and Name Changes ==
The first ever event was held on 1 November 1987 in Putte-Peulis and it was sponsored by the Flemish newspaper Gazet van Antwerpen. Between 1987 and 2012 the event was known as Gazet van Antwerpen Trofee. After that it changed the sponsor several times. Between 2012 and 2016 it was known as BPost Bank Trophy and between 2017 and 2019 it was known as the DVV Trophy. Since 2020 the event is known as X²O Badkamers Trophy. The Elite Women final classification is known as Soudal Ladies Trophy while the Under-23 Men classification is known as Trimetal Rookie Trophy.

In Belgium and the Netherlands the event is called Trofee veldrijden.

From Season	Until Season	Main Sponsor
1987–88	2011–12	Gazet van Antwerpen
2012–13	2015–16	BPost Bank
2016–17	2019–20	DVV
2020–21		X²O Badkamers

== Classification System ==
In 2012–2013 season, the way that the general classification was calculated was changed from a points system to using the riders' finishing times of each race (like a road racing stage race) with time 'bonuses' also available at an intermediate 'sprint' at the end of the first lap with 15, 10 and 5 seconds being awarded. Starting with the 2025–26 edition, the riders with the top 3 fastest laps will also be awarded 15, 10 and 5 seconds each, with each rider getting at most one such bonus based only on their fastest lap. The maximum time a rider can lose in the general classification is 5 minutes, excluding the bonus seconds. When a rider does not finish or does not start, they are handed a 5-minute time loss, excluding bonus seconds.

== Results ==
=== Men Elite ===
Season	Winner	Second	Third
X²O Badkamers Trophy
2025–2026	Joris Nieuwenhuis (NED)	Niels Vandeputte (BEL)	Cameron Mason (GBR)
2024–2025	Eli Iserbyt (BEL)	Toon Aerts (BEL)	Pim Ronhaar (NED)
2023–2024	Lars van der Haar (NED)	Eli Iserbyt (BEL)	Michael Vanthourenhout (BEL)
2022–2023	Eli Iserbyt (BEL)	Lars van der Haar (NED)	Michael Vanthourenhout (BEL)
2021–2022	Toon Aerts (BEL)	Eli Iserbyt (BEL)	Michael Vanthourenhout (BEL)
2020–2021	Eli Iserbyt (BEL)	Toon Aerts (BEL)	Michael Vanthourenhout (BEL)
DVV Trophy
2019–2020	Eli Iserbyt (BEL)	Michael Vanthourenhout (BEL)	Mathieu van der Poel (NED)
2018–2019	Mathieu van der Poel (NED)	Toon Aerts (BEL)	Michael Vanthourenhout (BEL)
2017–2018	Mathieu van der Poel (NED)	Toon Aerts (BEL)	Wout van Aert (BEL)
2016–2017	Wout van Aert (BEL)	Kevin Pauwels (BEL)	Michael Vanthourenhout (BEL)
BPost Bank Trophy
2015–2016	Wout van Aert (BEL)	Kevin Pauwels (BEL)	Sven Nys (BEL)
2014–2015	Wout van Aert (BEL)	Kevin Pauwels (BEL)	Sven Nys (BEL)
2013–2014	Sven Nys (BEL)	Niels Albert (BEL)	Tom Meeusen (BEL)
2012–2013	Niels Albert (BEL)	Klaas Vantornout (BEL)	Kevin Pauwels (BEL)
Gazet van Antwerpen Trophy
2011–2012	Kevin Pauwels (BEL)	Zdeněk Štybar (CZE)	Sven Nys (BEL)
2010–2011	Sven Nys (BEL)	Zdeněk Štybar (CZE)	Kevin Pauwels (BEL)
2009–2010	Sven Nys (BEL)	Zdeněk Štybar (CZE)	Niels Albert (BEL)
2008–2009	Sven Nys (BEL)	Bart Wellens (BEL)	Zdeněk Štybar (CZE)
2007–2008	Sven Nys (BEL)	Bart Wellens (BEL)	Zdeněk Štybar (CZE)
2006–2007	Sven Nys (BEL)	Niels Albert (BEL)	Richard Groenendaal (NED)
2005–2006	Sven Nys (BEL)	Bart Wellens (BEL)	Erwin Vervecken (BEL)
2004–2005	Sven Nys (BEL)	Sven Vanthourenhout (BEL)	Erwin Vervecken (BEL)
2003–2004	Bart Wellens (BEL)	Ben Berden (BEL)	Sven Nys (BEL)
2002–2003	Sven Nys (BEL)	Bart Wellens (BEL)	Mario De Clercq (BEL)
2001–2002	Erwin Vervecken (BEL)	Peter Van Santvliet (BEL)	Bart Wellens (BEL)
2000–2001	Erwin Vervecken (BEL)	Bart Wellens (BEL)	Peter Willemsens (BEL)
1999–2000	Arne Daelmans (BEL)	Bart Wellens (BEL)	Peter Willemsens (BEL)
1998–1999	Marc Janssens (BEL)	Arne Daelmans (BEL)	Peter Willemsens (BEL)
1997–1998	Arne Daelmans (BEL)	Danny De Bie (BEL)	Peter Willemsens (BEL)
1996–1997	Paul Herygers (BEL)	Alex Moonen (BEL)	Peter Willemsens (BEL)
1995–1996	Paul Herygers (BEL)	Peter Willemsens (BEL)	Arne Daelmans (BEL)
1994–1995	Paul Herygers (BEL)	Peter Willemsens (BEL)	Arne Daelmans (BEL)
1993–1994	Paul Herygers (BEL)	Danny De Bie (BEL)	Peter Willemsens (BEL)
1992–1993	Paul Herygers (BEL)	Peter Willemsens (BEL)	Staf Van Bouwel (BEL)
1991–1992	Dirk Pauwels (BEL)	Pascal Van Riet (BEL)	Guy Van Dijck (BEL)
1990–1991	Marc Janssens (BEL)	Peter Van Santvliet (BEL)	Ludo De Rey (BEL)
1989–1990	Guy Van Dijck (BEL)	Wim Lambrechts (BEL)	Kurt De Roose (BEL)
1988–1989	Guy Van Dijck (BEL)	Rudy De Bie (BEL)	Dirk Pauwels (BEL)
1987–1988	Rudy De Bie (BEL)	Christian Hautekeete (BEL)	Yvan Messelis (BEL)

=== Women Elite ===
Season	Winner	Second	Third
X²O Badkamers Trophy
2025–2026	Lucinda Brand (NED)	Manon Bakker (NED)	Inge van der Heijden (NED)
2024–2025	Lucinda Brand (NED)	Annemarie Worst (NED)	Sara Casasola (ITA)
2023–2024	Fem van Empel (NED)	Lucinda Brand (NED)	Annemarie Worst (NED)
2022–2023	Fem van Empel (NED)	Lucinda Brand (NED)	Ceylin del Carmen Alvarado (NED)
2021–2022	Lucinda Brand (NED)	Denise Betsema (NED)	Annemarie Worst (NED)
2020–2021	Lucinda Brand (NED)	Denise Betsema (NED)	Ceylin del Carmen Alvarado (NED)
DVV Trophy
2019–2020	Ceylin del Carmen Alvarado (NED)	Annemarie Worst (NED)	Yara Kastelijn (NED)
2018–2019	Sanne Cant (BEL)	Loes Sels (BEL)	Nikki Brammeier (GBR)
2017–2018	Katie Compton (USA)	Nikki Brammeier (GBR)	Maud Kaptheijns (NED)
2016–2017	Sanne Cant (BEL)	Thalita de Jong (NED)	Ellen Van Loy (BEL)
BPost Bank Trophy
2015–2016	Sanne Cant (BEL)	Jolien Verschueren (BEL)	Helen Wyman (GBR)
2014–2015	Ellen Van Loy (BEL)	Sanne Cant (BEL)	Sophie de Boer (NED)
2013–2014	Sanne Cant (BEL)	Helen Wyman (GBR)	Nikki Harris (GBR)
2012–2013	Sanne Cant (BEL)	Helen Wyman (GBR)	Ellen Van Loy (BEL)
Gazet van Antwerpen Trophy
2011–2012	Daphny van den Brand (NED)	Sanne Cant (BEL)	Nikki Harris (GBR)
2010–2011	Sanne Cant (BEL)	Daphny van den Brand (NED)	Helen Wyman (GBR)
2009–2010	Daphny van den Brand (NED)	Sanne Cant (BEL)	Helen Wyman (GBR)
2008–2009	Daphny van den Brand (NED)	Marianne Vos (NED)	Sanne Cant (BEL)
2007–2008	Daphny van den Brand (NED)	Reza Hormes-Ravenstijn (NED)	Sanne Cant (BEL)

=== Men Under 23 ===
Season	Winner	Second	Third
X²O Badkamers Trophy
2025–2026	Guus van den Eijnden (NED)	Kay De Bruyckere (BEL)	Viktor Vandenberghe (BEL)
2024–2025	Kay De Bruyckere (BEL)	Yordi Corsus (BEL)	Seppe Van Den Boer (BEL)
2023–2024	Arne Baers (BEL)	Victor Van de Putte (BEL)	David Haverdings (NED)
2022–2023	Joran Wyseure (BEL)	Victor Van de Putte (BEL)	David Haverdings (NED)
2021–2022	Pim Ronhaar (NED)	Thibau Nys (BEL)	Joran Wyseure (BEL)
DVV Trophy
2019–2020	Timo Kielich (BEL)	Yentl Beckaert (BEL)	Niels Vandeputte (BEL)
2018–2019	Niels Derveaux (BEL)	Lander Loockx (BEL)	Andreas Goeman (BEL)
2017–2018	Eli Iserbyt (BEL)	Yannick Peeters (BEL)	Thomas Joseph (BEL)
2016–2017	Eli Iserbyt (BEL)	Nicolas Cleppe (BEL)	Gosse van der Meer (NED)
BPost Bank Trophy
2015–2016	Quinten Hermans (BEL)	Daan Hoeyberghs (BEL)	Nicolas Cleppe (BEL)
2014–2015	Laurens Sweeck (BEL)	Michael Vanthourenhout (BEL)	Toon Aerts (BEL)
2013–2014	Wout van Aert (BEL)	Mathieu van der Poel (NED)	Laurens Sweeck (BEL)
2012–2013	Wietse Bosmans (BEL)	Corné van Kessel (NED)	Michael Vanthourenhout (BEL)
Gazet van Antwerpen Trophy
2011–2012	Lars van der Haar (NED)	Wietse Bosmans (BEL)	Micki van Empel (NED)
2010–2011	Lars van der Haar (NED)	Jim Aernouts (BEL)	Joeri Adams (BEL)
2009–2010	Tom Meeusen (BEL)	Jim Aernouts (BEL)	Jan Denuwelaere (BEL)
2008–2009	Philipp Walsleben (GER)	Jim Aernouts (BEL)	Kenneth Van Compernolle (BEL)
2007–2008	Tom Meeusen (BEL)	Jempy Drucker (LUX)	Philipp Walsleben (GER)
2006–2007	Dieter Vanthourenhout (BEL)	Rob Peeters (BEL)	Kenny Geluykens (BEL)
2005–2006	Niels Albert (BEL)	Kevin Pauwels (BEL)	Zdeněk Štybar (CZE)
2004–2005	Kevin Pauwels (BEL)	Mariusz Gil (POL)	Bart Dirkx (NED)
2003–2004	Bart Aernouts (BEL)	Wesley Van der Linden (BEL)	Kevin Pauwels (BEL)

=== Women Junior ===
Season	Winner	Second	Third
X²O Badkamers Trophy
2022–2023	Isabella Holmgren (CAN)	Ava Holmgren (CAN)	Lore De Schepper (BEL)
2021–2022	Leonie Bentveld (NED)	Ava Holmgren (CAN)	Katherine Sarkisov (USA)
DVV Trophy
2019–2020	Fem van Empel (NED)	Leonie Bentveld (NED)	Ilse Pluimers (NED)

== See also ==
- UCI Cyclo-cross World Cup
- Cyclo-cross Superprestige
