= Paul Herygers =

Belgian cyclist

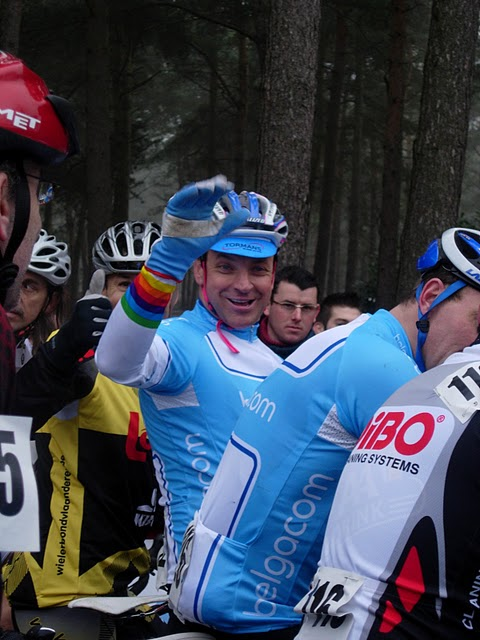

Personal information
- Full name: Paul Herygers
- Born: 22 November 1962 (age 63) Herentals, Belgium

Cycling career
- Sport: Cycling
- Disciplines: Cyclo-cross; Mountain bike racing
- Role: Rider

Professional teams
- 1992: Saxon-Gatorade
- 1993: Saxon-Breitex
- 1994: Saxon-Selle Italia
- 1995–1996: Tönissteiner-Saxon
- 1997: Tönissteiner-Colnago
- 1998: Tönissteiner-Colnago-Saxon
- 1999: Spar-RDM

Major wins
- Cyclo-cross World Championship (1994) Belgian Cyclo-cross Championship (1993, 1997) Belgian Mountainbike Championship (1990, 1991, 1992) World Cup (1994) GvA Trophy (1993, 1994, 1995, 1996, 1997)
Medal record
Representing Belgium
Men's cyclo-cross
World Championships
Gold medal – first place	1994 Koksijde	Men's Elite Race

Paul Herygers (born 22 November 1962) is a retired Belgian cyclo-cross cyclist.

Herygers was born in Herentals, Belgium. In his second year as a professional he was Belgian Champion, beating Danny De Bie in a sprint. The following year he became World Champion in Koksijde, ahead of Richard Groenendaal and his compatriot Erwin Vervecken. In 1997 he became Belgian cyclo-cross champion for the second time.

Herygers is a commentator for cyclo-cross for Sporza and cyclo-cross coordinator of the Belgian cycling association, the KBWB. Paul Herygers was an advisor to World Cyclocross Champion Fem Van Empel at end of the season 2022–2023.

== Major results ==
=== Cyclo-cross ===
1983
1st Contern Cyclocross
1992
1st Cyclocross Rijkevorsel
1st Cyclo-cross Kalmthout
1st Kasteelcross Zonnebeke
2nd Duinencross Koksijde
3rd Cyclocross Ravels
1993
1st National CX Championships
1st Cyclocross Rijkevorsel
1st Ziklokross Igorre
1st Superprestige Gieten
1st Cyclocross Ravels
1st Cyclocross Contern
1st Kasteelcross Zonnebeke
1st Cyclocross Steinmaur
1st Vlaamse Aardbeiencross Hoogstraten
1st Cyclocross Eindhoven
1st Cyclocross Eschenbach
1st Krawatencross Lille
1st General Classification GvA Trophy
2nd Cyclo-cross Kalmthout
2nd Duinencross Koksijde
2nd Jaarmarktcross Niel
3rd Azencross Loenhout
3rd GP Essen
1994
1st UCI World CX Championships
1st Cyclocross Rijkevorsel
1st Cyclo-cross Kalmthout
1st Cyclocross Silvelle
1st GP Essen
1st Superprestige Gieten
1st Duinencross Koksijde
1st Jaarmarktcross Niel
1st Kasteelcross Zonnebeke
1st Cyclocross Steinmaur
1st Cyclocross Harnes
1st Krawatencross Lille
1st General Classification UCI World Cup CX
1st General Classification GvA Trophy
2nd Cyclocross Corva di Azzano
2nd Vlaamse Aardbeiencross Hoogstraten
3rd Superprestige Diegem
3rd Ziklokross Igorre
1995
1st Azencross Loenhout
1st Cyclocross Rijkevorsel
1st Kasteelcross Zonnebeke
1st GP Essen
1st Jaarmarktcross Niel
1st Contern Cyclocross
1st Kasteelcross Zonnebeke
1st Cyclocross Steinmaur
1st Vlaamse Aardbeiencross Hoogstraten
1st Sluitingsprijs Oostmalle
1st Krawatencross Lille
1st Cyclo-cross Ruddervoorde
3rd Cyclocross Silvelle
3rd Cyclocross Ravels
1st General Classification GvA Trophy
1996
1st Cyclocross Rijkevorsel
1st Kasteelcross Zonnebeke
1st Vlaamse Aardbeiencross Hoogstraten
1st Noordzeecross Middelkerke
1st Kermiscross Ardooie
1st Sluitingsprijs Oostmalle
1st Cyclocross Pont-Château
1st Bredenecross
1st Nationale Cyclo-Cross Otegem
1st Cyklokros Tábor
1st General Classification GvA Trophy
2nd National CX Championships
2nd Cyclocross Steinmaur
2nd GP Essen
2nd Cyclocross Ravels
2nd Krawatencross Lille
1997
1st National CX Championships
1st Noordzeecross Middelkerke
1st Kermiscross Ardooie
1st Sluitingsprijs Oostmalle
1st Surhuisterveen
1st General Classification GvA Trophy
2nd Contern Cyclocross
2nd Cyclocross Steinmaur
3rd Azencross Loenhout
1998
1st Kermiscross Ardooie
2nd Surhuisterveen
3rd Noordzeecross Middelkerke

=== Mountainbike ===
1990
1st National Championships Mountainbike
1991
1st National Championships Mountainbike
1992
1st National Championships Mountainbike

== Honours and awards ==
- Crystal Bicycle – Best Professional Cyclist: 1994
- Honorary Citizen of Koksijde: 1994

Sporting positions
Preceded by Bart Musschoot	Belgian Mountainbike Champion (3); 1990–1992	Succeeded by Benny Heylen
