= Jeremy Durrin =

American cyclo-cross cyclist (born 1988)

Personal information
- Born: August 11, 1988 (age 38) Bronx, New York, United States

Cycling career
- Sport: Cycling
- Disciplines: Cyclo-cross; Road
- Role: Rider

Amateur teams
- 2008: Gamache Cyclery
- 2009: Northampton CC
- 2010: WheelHouse
- 2011–2012: JAM Fund
- 2015–2018: Neon Velo

Professional team
- 2013–2014: Optum–Kelly Benefit Strategies

Jeremy Durrin (born August 11, 1988) is an American former professional road and cyclo-cross cyclist. He represented his nation in the men's elite event at the 2016 UCI Cyclo-cross World Championships in Heusden-Zolder.

== Major results ==
2011–2012
3rd Baystate Cyclo-cross
2012–2013
1st Baystate Cyclo-cross
2nd NEPCX - The Cycle-Smart International 1
2nd Downeast Cyclo-cross - NECX - Day 2
2nd Nittany Lion Cross
2nd Rohrbach's Ellison Park Cyclocross
3rd Baystate Cyclo-cross - NECX
3rd HPCX
2013–2014
1st Baystate Cyclo-cross - NECX
2nd Super Cross Cup 2
3rd Baystate Cyclo-cross
2014–2015
2nd The Cycle-Smart International 2
3rd Trek CXC Cup 2
3rd Nittany Lion Cross 2
2015–2016
1st Manitoba Grand Prix of Cyclocross
3rd Kingsport Cyclo-cross Cup
3rd Resolution 'Cross Cup 1
3rd Highlander 'Cross Cup
2016–2017
1st Nittany Lion Cross 1 & 2
2nd NBX Gran Prix of Cross 1
2nd HPCX 2
3rd The Cycle-Smart Northampton International
3rd Gran Prix of Gloucester 1
2017–2018
3rd Overall British National Trophy Series

3rd Derby
