= 2009–10 Cyclo-cross Superprestige =

Details
- Dates: 11 October 2009 – 14 February 2010
- Location: Belgium and Netherlands
- Races: 8

Champions
- Male individual champion: Zdeněk Štybar (CZE)

The 2009–10 Cyclo-cross Superprestige events and season-long competition took place between 11 October 2009 and 14 February 2010. Eight events were organised and the overall title went to Zdeněk Štybar.

== Results ==
Date	Venue	Winner	Second	Third
11 October	(Belgium) Ruddervoorde	Sven Nys (BEL)	Niels Albert (BEL)	Zdeněk Štybar (CZE)
1 November	(Belgium) Hoogstraten	Niels Albert (BEL)	Zdeněk Štybar (CZE)	Sven Nys (BEL)
15 November	(Belgium) Asper-Gavere	Niels Albert (BEL)	Sven Nys (BEL)	Zdeněk Štybar (CZE)
22 November	(Belgium) Hamme-Zogge	Zdeněk Štybar (CZE)	Sven Nys (BEL)	Klaas Vantornout (BEL)
29 November	(Netherlands) Gieten	Sven Nys (BEL)	Kevin Pauwels (BEL)	Niels Albert (BEL)
27 December	(Belgium) Diegem	Niels Albert (BEL)	Zdeněk Štybar (CZE)	Kevin Pauwels (BEL)
7 February	(Belgium) Zonhoven	Sven Nys (BEL)	Zdeněk Štybar (CZE)	Kevin Pauwels (BEL)
12 February	(Belgium) Vorselaar	Zdeněk Štybar (CZE)	Niels Albert (BEL)	Radomír Šimůnek (CZE)

=== Standings ===
In each race, the top 15 riders gain points, going from 15 points for the winner decreasing by one point per position to 1 point for the rider finishing in 15th position. In case of ties in the total score of two or more riders, the result of the last race counts as decider. If this is not decisive because two or more riders scored no points, the penultimate race counts, and so on until there is a difference.

Pos	Name	Tot	RUD	HGS	A-G	H-Z	GIE	DIE	ZON	VOR
1	Zdeněk Štybar (CZE)	110	13	14	13	15	12	14	14	15
2	Niels Albert (BEL)	109	14	15	15	12	13	15	11	14
3	Sven Nys (BEL)	98	15	13	14	14	15	0	15	12
4	Klaas Vantornout (BEL)	88	11	11	11	13	10	10	12	10
5	Kevin Pauwels (BEL)	82	6	12	12	7	14	13	13	5
6	Bart Aernouts (BEL)	61	9	7	10	8	11	7	9	0
7	Radomír Šimůnek (CZE)	57	10	9	4	9	0	6	6	13
8	Erwin Vervecken (BEL)	50	4	8	9	10	0	9	10	0
9	Gerben de Knegt (NED)	48	5	10	7	4	4	12	5	1
10	Sven Vanthourenhout (BEL)	39	12	0	0	11	8	0	8	0
11	Enrico Franzoi (ITA)	36	7	0	8	5	6	8	2	0
12	Dieter Vanthourenhout (BEL)	34	8	6	6	2	0	0	1	11
13	Rob Peeters (BEL)	25	3	5	2	3	5	4	0	3
14	Philipp Walsleben (GER)	19	0	0	5	0	9	5	0	0
15	Jonathan Page (USA)	18	0	0	0	0	1	1	7	9
16	Bart Wellens (BEL)	17	0	0	0	0	0	11	0	6
17	Jan Verstraeten (BEL)	12	2	4	0	6	0	0	0	0
18	Mariusz Gil (POL)	10	0	0	0	0	3	0	0	7
19	Christian Heule (SUI)	8	0	0	0	0	0	0	0	8
20	Petr Dlask (CZE)	7	0	0	0	0	0	0	3	4
21	Martin Zlamalik (CZE)	7	0	1	3	0	0	3	0	0
22	Francis Mourey (FRA)	7	0	0	0	0	7	0	0	0
23	Thijs Al (NED)	4	0	0	0	0	0	0	4	0
24	Eddy van IJzendoorn (NED)	3	1	0	0	0	0	0	0	2
25	Wilant van Gils (NED)	3	0	3	0	0	0	0	0	0
26	Thijs van Amerongen (NED)	3	0	2	0	1	0	0	0	0
27	Steve Chainel (FRA)	2	0	0	0	0	0	2	0	0
28	Ben Berden (BEL)	2	0	0	0	0	2	0	0	0
29	John Gadret (FRA)	1	0	0	1	0	0	0	0	0
Pos	Name	Tot	RUD	HGS	A-G	H-Z	GIE	DIE	ZON	VOR

== See also ==
- 2009–2010 UCI Cyclo-cross World Cup
- 2009–2010 Cyclo-cross Gazet van Antwerpen
