= 2012 UCI Cyclo-cross World Championships =

Cyclo-cross championship

- Venue: Koksijde, Belgium
- Date: 28–29 January 2012
- Coordinates: 51°06′N 02°39′E
- Events: 4

The 2012 UCI Cyclo-cross World Championships is the World Championship for cyclo-cross for the season 2011-2012. It took place in Koksijde, Belgium on the weekend of January 28 and 29, 2012. As in the previous years, four events were scheduled. The event was the biggest Cyclo-cross World Championship yet, in terms of attendance. About 61,000 people headed down to Koksijde on Sunday for the main event.

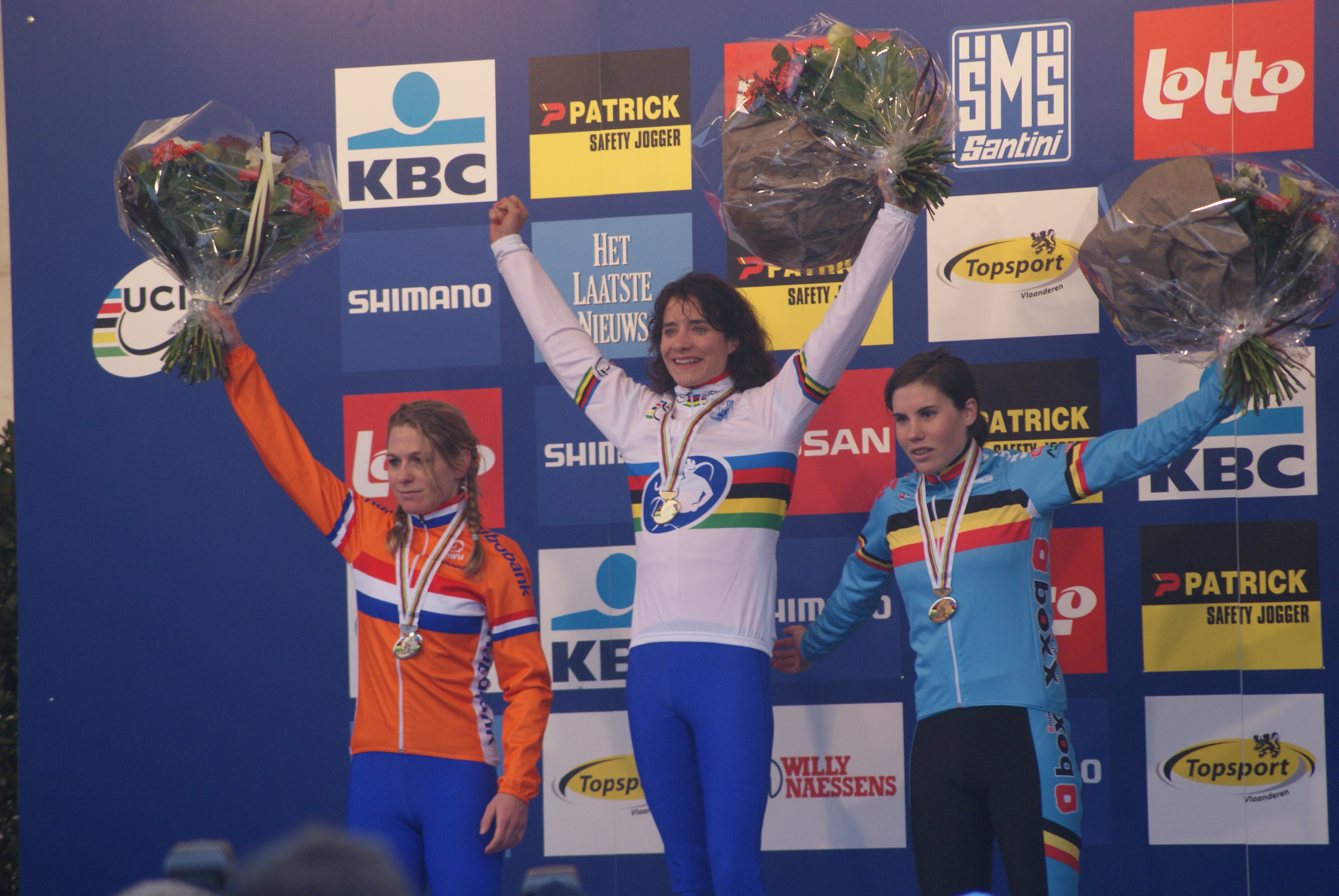
Daphny Van Den Brand, Marianne Vos and Sanne Cant

== Medal table ==
Rank	Nation	Gold	Silver	Bronze	Total
1	Netherlands (NED)	3	1	1	5
2	Belgium (BEL)	1	3	2	6
3	France (FRA)	0	0	1	1
Totals (3 entries)		4	4	4	12

== Medal summary ==
Event	Gold		Silver		Bronze	
Men's events
Men's elite race	Niels Albert; Belgium	1h 06'07"	Rob Peeters; Belgium	+ 24"	Kevin Pauwels; Belgium	+ 30"
Men's under-23 race	Lars van der Haar; Netherlands	49'20"	Wietse Bosmans; Belgium	+ 1"	Michiel van der Heijden; Netherlands	+ 3"
Men's junior race	Mathieu van der Poel; Netherlands	43'36"	Wout van Aert; Belgium	+ 8"	Quentin Jaurégui; France	+ 21"
Women's events
Women's elite race	Marianne Vos; Netherlands	41'04""	Daphny Van Den Brand; Netherlands	+ 37"	Sanne Cant; Belgium	+ 38"
