= Krawatencross =

Cyclo-cross race held in Lille, Belgium

Race details
- Date: February
- Region: Lille, Belgium
- English name: Cyclo-cross of the Croats
- Discipline: Cyclo-cross
- Competition: Cyclo-cross Trophy
- Type: one-day
- Web site: www.krawatencross.be

History (men)
- First edition: 1992
- Editions: 33 (as of 2026)
- First winner: Erwin Vervecken (BEL)
- Most wins: Sven Nys (BEL) (7 wins)
- Most recent: Niels Vandeputte (BEL)

History (women)
- First edition: 2003
- Editions: 20 (as of 2026)
- First winner: Anja Nobus (BEL)
- Most wins: Sanne Cant (BEL) (5 wins)
- Most recent: Ceylin del Carmen Alvarado (NED)

The Krawatencross is a cyclo-cross race held in Lille, Belgium. It is held in the Lilse Bergen on the sandy edge of a bathing lake. The first edition was held in 1992, and it has been held every year as part of the Cyclo-cross Trophy, except in 2004 and 2016 when Belgian National Cyclo-cross Championships were held in Lille.

The literal translation of the name is Cyclo-cross of the Croats, which refers to a local historical event from the 17th century involving the Croat cavalry.

== Past winners ==
Year	Men's winner	Women's winner
2026	(Belgium) Niels Vandeputte	(Netherlands) Ceylin del Carmen Alvarado
2025	(Belgium) Laurens Sweeck	(Netherlands) Lucinda Brand
2024	(Belgium) Niels Vandeputte	(Netherlands) Fem van Empel
2023	(Belgium) Laurens Sweeck	(Netherlands) Fem van Empel
2022	(Belgium) Toon Aerts	(Netherlands) Lucinda Brand
2021	(Belgium) Laurens Sweeck	(Netherlands) Ceylin del Carmen Alvarado
2020	(Belgium) Wout van Aert	(Netherlands) Ceylin del Carmen Alvarado
2019	(Netherlands) Mathieu van der Poel	(Belgium) Sanne Cant
2018	(Netherlands) Mathieu van der Poel	(Belgium) Sanne Cant
2017	(Netherlands) Mathieu van der Poel	(Netherlands) Maud Kaptheijns
2016	Not held due to organization of Belgian National Cyclo-cross Championships	
2015	(Netherlands) Mathieu van der Poel	(Belgium) Sanne Cant
2014	(Belgium) Sven Nys	(Belgium) Sanne Cant
2013	(Belgium) Niels Albert	(Netherlands) Marianne Vos
2012	(Belgium) Tom Meeusen	(Netherlands) Marianne Vos
2011	(Belgium) Kevin Pauwels	(Belgium) Sanne Cant
2010	(Belgium) Sven Nys	not held
2009	(Belgium) Niels Albert	(Netherlands) Daphny van den Brand
2008	(Belgium) Niels Albert	not held
2007	(Belgium) Sven Nys	(Netherlands) Reza Hormes-Ravenstijn
2006	(Belgium) Sven Nys	(Netherlands) Reza Hormes-Ravenstijn
2005	(Belgium) Sven Nys	(Belgium) Anja Nobus
2004	Not held due to organization of Belgian National Cyclo-cross Championships	
2003	(Belgium) Arne Daelmans	(Belgium) Anja Nobus
2002	(Belgium) Bart Wellens	not held
2001	(Belgium) Sven Nys	not held
2000	(Belgium) Sven Nys	not held
1999	(Belgium) Bart Wellens	not held
1998	(Belgium) Erwin Vervecken	not held
1997	(Netherlands) Adrie van der Poel	not held
1996	(Belgium) Erwin Vervecken	not held
1995	(Belgium) Paul Herygers	not held
1994	(Belgium) Paul Herygers	not held
1993	(Belgium) Paul Herygers	not held
1992	(Belgium) Peter Willemsens	not held
