= 2009–10 Cyclo-cross Gazet van Antwerpen =

The 2009–2010 Cyclo-cross Gazet van Antwerpen took place between 10 October 2009 and 21 February 2010. This season, all eight rounds took place in Belgium. Sven Nys won the overall trophy in the elite men category, followed by Zdeněk Štybar and Niels Albert.

== Men results ==
Date	Venue	1st place, gold medalist(s)	2nd place, silver medalist(s)	3rd place, bronze medalist(s)
10 October	Namur	Niels Albert (BEL)	Sven Nys (BEL)	Zdeněk Štybar (CZE)
25 October	Oudenaarde	Sven Nys (BEL)	Niels Albert (BEL)	Klaas Vantornout (BEL)
21 November	Hasselt	Zdeněk Štybar (CZE)	Kevin Pauwels (BEL)	Niels Albert (BEL)
12 December	Essen	Niels Albert (BEL)	Sven Nys (BEL)	Zdeněk Štybar (CZE)
29 December	Loenhout	Sven Nys (BEL)	Niels Albert (BEL)	Zdeněk Štybar (CZE)
1 January	Baal	Sven Nys (BEL)	Zdeněk Štybar (CZE)	Niels Albert (BEL)
6 February	Lille	Sven Nys (BEL)	Zdeněk Štybar (CZE)	Kevin Pauwels (BEL)
21 February	Oostmalle	Bart Wellens (BEL)	Zdeněk Štybar (CZE)	Kevin Pauwels (BEL)

== See also ==
- 2009–2010 UCI Cyclo-cross World Cup
- 2009–2010 Cyclo-cross Superprestige
