= Cyclo-cross Essen =

Belgian cyclo-cross race

Race details
- Date: December
- Region: Essen, Belgium
- Discipline: Cyclo-cross
- Competition: BPost Bank Trophy

History
- First edition: 1965
- Editions: 60 (as of 2025)
- First winner: Guy Goossens (BEL)
- Most wins: Sven Nys (BEL) (6 wins)
- Most recent: Toon Vandebosch (BEL)

The Cyclo-cross Essen, currently known as Robotland Cyclo-cross for sponsorship reasons and previously Grand Prix Rouwmoer, is a cyclo-cross race held in Essen, Belgium, which was until 2017 part of the BPost Bank Trophy.

== Past winners ==
Year	Winner
2025	(Belgium) Toon Vandebosch
2024	(Belgium) Laurens Sweeck
2023	(Belgium) Wout van Aert
2022	(Belgium) Gerben Kuypers
2021	(Belgium) Wout van Aert
2020	(Netherlands) Mathieu van der Poel
2019	(Belgium) Quinten Hermans
2018	(Belgium) Laurens Sweeck
2017	(Netherlands) Mathieu van der Poel
2016	(Belgium) Wout Van Aert
2015	(Belgium) Wout Van Aert
2014	(Belgium) Wout Van Aert
2013	(Belgium) Kevin Pauwels
2012	(Belgium) Jan Denuwelaere (Note: Zdeněk Štybar passed the line first, after accidentally pushing Denuwelaere over during the sprint. Denuwelaere slid over the finish line as second. Štybar was relegated to the fourth position for his action.)
2011	(Belgium) Bart Wellens
2010	(Belgium) Sven Nys
2009	(Belgium) Niels Albert
2008	(Belgium) Sven Nys
2007	(Belgium) Sven Nys
2006	(Belgium) Sven Nys
2005	(Belgium) Bart Wellens
2004	(Belgium) Bart Wellens
2003	(Belgium) Bart Wellens
2002	(Belgium) Sven Nys
2001	(Belgium) Mario De Clercq
2000	(Belgium) Peter Van Santvliet
1999	(Belgium) Bart Wellens
1998	(Belgium) Sven Nys
1997	(Netherlands) Richard Groenendaal
1996	(Netherlands) Adrie van der Poel
1995	(Belgium) Paul Herijgers
1994	(Belgium) Paul Herijgers
1993	(Belgium) Paul Herijgers
1992	(Belgium) Danny De Bie
1991	(Belgium) Danny De Bie
1990	(Belgium) Roland Liboton
1989	(Belgium) Guy Vandijck
1988	(Belgium) Dirk Pauwels
1987	(Belgium) Walter Marijnissen
1986	(Belgium) Walter Marijnissen
1985	(Belgium) Noël Danneels
1984	(Belgium) Jan Teugels
1983	(Belgium) Ludo De Rey
1982	(Netherlands) Henk Baars
1981	(Belgium) Johan Ghyllebert
1979	(Netherlands) Hennie Stamsnijder
1978	(Belgium) Alfons Van Parijs
1977	(West Germany) Klaus-Peter Thaler
1976	(Netherlands) Gert Wildeboer
1975	(Belgium) Hendrik Arnouts
1974	(Belgium) Jan Teugels
1973	(Belgium) Leo Arnouts
1972	(Belgium) Auguste Badts
1971	(Belgium) Flory Ongenae
1970	(Belgium) Freddy Nijs
1969	(Belgium) Freddy Nijs
1968	(Belgium) Auguste Badts
1967	(Belgium) Flory Ongenae
1966	(Netherlands) Cock van der Hulst
1965	(Belgium) Guy Goossens

== Women ==
Year	Winner	2nd	3rd
2025	(Netherlands) Lucinda Brand	(Italy) Sara Casasola	(Belgium) Marion Norbert-Riberolle
2024	(Belgium) Marion Norbert-Riberolle	(Italy) Sara Casasola	(Belgium) Laura Verdonschot
2023	(Belgium) Marion Norbert-Riberolle	(Netherlands) Aniek van Alphen	(Belgium) Laura Verdonschot
2022	(Netherlands) Aniek van Alphen	(Belgium) Alicia Franck	(United Kingdom) Yara Kastelijn
2021	(United Kingdom) Zoe Bäckstedt	(Belgium) Laura Verdonschot	(United Kingdom) Anna Kay
2020	(Netherlands) Marianne Vos	(France) Perrine Clauzel	(Netherlands) Inge van der Heijden
2019	(Netherlands) Marianne Vos	(Hungary) Kata Blanka Vas	(United Kingdom) Anna Kay
2018	(Netherlands) Maud Kaptheijns	(Netherlands) Lucinda Brand	(Italy) Eva Lechner
2017	(Belgium) Sanne Cant	(United Kingdom) Nikki Brammeier	(United States) Katie Compton
2016	(Belgium) Sanne Cant	(Netherlands) Sophie de Boer	(Netherlands) Thalita de Jong
2015	(Belgium) Sanne Cant	(Netherlands) Thalita de Jong	(Belgium) Jolien Verschueren
2014	(Netherlands) Sophie de Boer	(Belgium) Sanne Cant	(Belgium) Ellen Van Loy
2013	(Belgium) Sanne Cant	(United Kingdom) Helen Wyman	(United Kingdom) Nikki Harris
2012	(Belgium) Sanne Cant	(United Kingdom) Helen Wyman	(United Kingdom) Nikki Harris
2011	(Netherlands) Marianne Vos	(Netherlands) Sophie de Boer	(United Kingdom) Nikki Harris
