= Baal, Belgium =

Village in Tremelo, Belgium

Coordinates: 50.9956°N 4.753°E

Baal is a village in the municipality of Tremelo, in the province of Flemish Brabant, Belgium.

It is notable as the home of successful cyclo-cross competitor Sven Nys. He is sometimes called by the nickname "the Kannibaal van Baal" (Dutch for "Cannibal of Baal").

The Grand Prix Sven Nys cyclo-cross race, named after Nys, is held annually in Baal.

Fellow cyclo-cross competitor Niels Albert also lives in Baal.
