= Ellen Van Loy =

Belgian cyclist

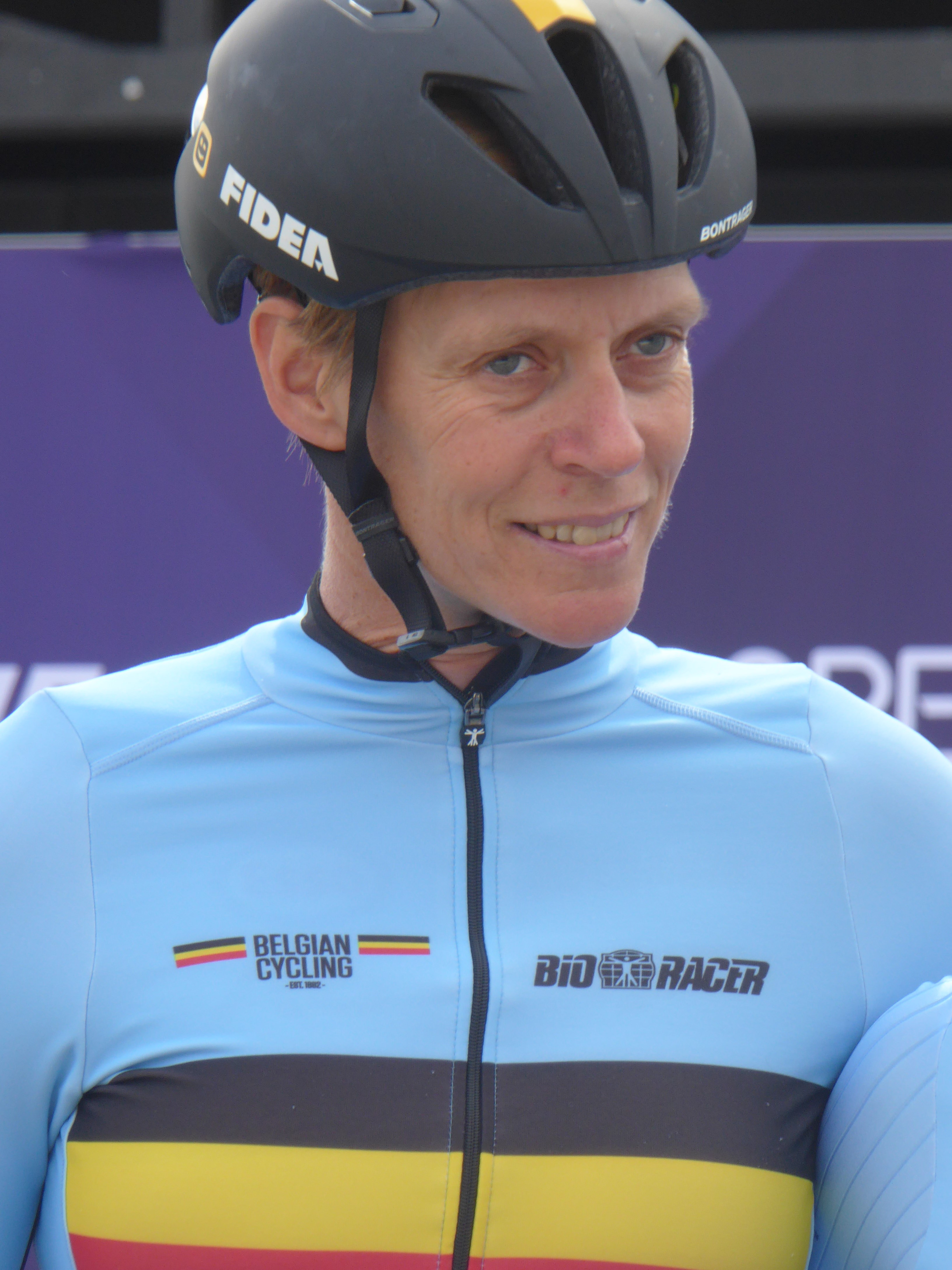
- Van Loy at the 2018 European Road Cycling Championships.

Personal information
- Full name: Ellen Van Loy
- Born: 16 September 1980 (age 46) Herentals, Belgium

Cycling career
- Sport: Cycling
- Current team: Telenet–Fidea Lions
- Disciplines: Cyclo-cross; Road
- Role: Rider

Amateur teams
- 2009–2010: Emversport
- 2011–2012: Kriekel
- 2012–2013: Melbotech Prorace
- 2013: DNCS–Pro 2012
- 2016–: Telenet–Fidea

Ellen Van Loy (born 16 September 1980) is a Belgian road and cyclo-cross cyclist. She represented her nation in the women's elite event at the 2016 UCI Cyclo-cross World Championships in Heusden-Zolder.
