= Cyclo-cross Sint-Michielsgestel =

The Super Prestige Sint-Michielsgestel is a cyclo-cross race held in Sint-Michielsgestel, Netherlands, which is part of the Superprestige.

== Past winners ==
Year	Men's winner	Women's winner
2010	(Belgium) Bart Aernouts	not held
2009 (Jan)	(Netherlands) Eddy van IJzendoorn	(Netherlands) Mirjam Melchers-van Poppel
2007/2008	Race not held	
2006 (Nov)	(Belgium) Sven Nys	(Netherlands) Arenda Grimberg
2005	(Belgium) Bart Wellens	(Netherlands) Daphny van den Brand
2004	(Belgium) Tom Vannoppen	not held
2003	(Belgium) Sven Nys	not held
2002	(Belgium) Sven Nys	not held
2001	(Belgium) Erwin Vervecken	not held
2000	(Netherlands) Richard Groenendaal	not held
1999	(Belgium) Sven Nys	not held
1998	(Netherlands) Richard Groenendaal	not held
1997	(Netherlands) Adrie van der Poel	not held
1996	(Netherlands) Adrie van der Poel	not held
