= 2009 UCI Cyclo-cross World Championships – Men's elite race =

Men's Elite Cyclo-cross Race
2009 UCI Cyclo-cross World Championships
- Rainbow jersey

Race details
- Dates: February 1, 2009
- Stages: 1
- Winning time: 1h 02' 24"

Medalists
	Gold	Niels Albert (BEL)
	Silver	Zdeněk Štybar (CZE)
	Bronze	Sven Nys (BEL)

This event was held on Sunday February 1, 2009 as part of the 2009 UCI Cyclo-cross World Championships in Hoogerheide, Netherlands. It was Niels Albert's first appearance in the Men's Elite World Championship and he immediately managed to get the most out of it.

== Ranking ==
Rank	Cyclist	Time
Gold medal	Niels Albert (BEL)	1:02:24
Silver medal	Zdenek Stybar (CZE)	+ 0:22
Bronze medal	Sven Nys (BEL)	+ 0:38
4	Bart Wellens (BEL)	+ 1:10
5	Francis Mourey (FRA)	+ 1:23
6	Kevin Pauwels (BEL)	+ 1:23
7	Sven Vanthourenhout (BEL)	+ 1:24
8	Simon Zahner (SUI)	+ 1:24
9	Steve Chainel (FRA)	+ 1:24
10	Klaas Vantornout (BEL)	+ 1:24
11	Marco Aurelio Fontana (ITA)	+ 1:24
12	Thijs Al (NED)	+ 1:24
13	Enrico Franzoi (ITA)	+ 1:25
14	Jonathan Lopez (FRA)	+ 1:26
15	Christian Heule (SUI)	+ 1:29
16	Gerben De Knegt (NED)	+ 1:50
17	Petr Dlask (CZE)	+ 1:51
18	Kamil Ausbuher (CZE)	+ 1:51
19	Erwin Vervecken (BEL)	+ 1:51
20	Lars Boom (NED)	+ 1:51
21	Eddy Van Ijzendoorn (NED)	+ 1:51
22	Marcel Wildhaber (SUI)	+ 1:52
23	José Antonio Hermida (ESP)	+ 1:52
24	Nicolas Bazin (FRA)	+ 1:56
25	Wilant Van Gils (NED)	+ 2:01
26	Radomír Šimůnek (CZE)	+ 2:45
27	Marco Bianco (ITA)	+ 2:46
28	René Birkenfeld (GER)	+ 2:47
29	Constantino Zaballa Gutierrez (ESP)	+ 2:48
30	Egoitz Murgoitio Rekalde (ESP)	+ 2:51
31	Jody Crawforth (GBR)	+ 2:53
32	Isaac Suarez Fernandez (ESP)	+ 2:53
33	Fabio Ursi (ITA)	+ 2:53
34	Mariusz Gil (POL)	+ 2:53
35	Jeremy Powers (USA)	+ 2:54
36	Marek Cichosz (POL)	+ 2:59
37	Milan Barenyi (SVK)	+ 3:11
38	Richard Groenendaal (NED)	+ 3:25
39	Ian Field (GBR)	+ 4:01
40	Joachim Parbo (DEN)	+ 4:17
41	Javier Ruiz De Larrinaga Ibanez (ESP)	+ 4:26
42	Peter Presslauer (AUT)	+ 4:35
43	Rafael Visinelli (ITA)	+ 4:36
44	Matt Shriver (USA)	+ 4:44
45	Gusty Bausch (LUX)	+ 4:47
46	Martin Haring (SVK)	+ 4:48
47	Magnus Darvell (SWE)	+ 4:49
48	Paul Oldham (GBR)	+ 4:56
49	Brian Matter (USA)	+ 5:12
50	Martin Zlamalik (CZE)	+ 5:19
51	Masanori Kosaka (JPN)	+ 5:24
52	Jonathan Page (USA)	+ 5:47
53	Maroš Kováč (SVK)	+ 6:26
54	Derrick St John (CAN)	Lapped
55	Jens Westergren (SWE)	Lapped
56	Aaron Schooler (CAN)	Lapped
57	Thijs Van Amerongen (NED)	Lapped
58	Zoltan Tisza (HUN)	Lapped
59	Evgeniy Pechenin (RUS)	Lapped
60	Marios Athanasiadis (CYP)	Lapped
61	Martin Vestby (NOR)	Lapped
62	Keiichi Tsujiura (JPN)	Lapped
63	Boris Vasilyev (RUS)	Lapped
64	Alexey Belokrylov (RUS)	Lapped
