= 2008 UCI Cyclo-cross World Championships – Men's elite race =

Men's Elite Cyclo-cross Race
2008 UCI Cyclo-cross World Championships
- Rainbow jersey

Race details
- Dates: January 27, 2008
- Stages: 1
- Winning time: 1h 05' 27"

Medalists
	Gold	Lars Boom (NED)
	Silver	Zdeněk Štybar (CZE)
	Bronze	Sven Nys (BEL)

This event was held on Sunday January 27, 2008 as part of the 2008 UCI Cyclo-cross World Championships in Treviso, Italy.

== Race summary ==
Due to the speedy track, no riders managed to break away from the pack and about 20 riders were still in contention for the title going into the final lap. One of the favourites, Lars Boom, managed to break away at the beginning of the last lap and stayed away, riding to his first World Championship title in the Men's Elite category. Sven Nys, Zdeněk Štybar and Erwin Vervecken came within 4 seconds of closing the gap again, but never succeeded. At the finish line, Štybar outsprinted Nys to take the silver, Vervecken finished fourth. Boom was the first non-Belgian winner since Richard Groenendaal in 2000.

Other favourites Francis Mourey and Bart Wellens crashed heavily in the sixth lap. Mourey abandoned the race, Wellens finished but was unable to recover fully and get back into the leading group.

== Ranking ==
Rank	Cyclist	Time
Gold medal	Lars Boom (NED)	1:05:27.79
Silver medal	Zdeněk Štybar (CZE)	+ 0:05.17
Bronze medal	Sven Nys (BEL)	+ 0:06.15
4	Erwin Vervecken (BEL)	+ 0:09.03
5	Radomír Šimůnek (CZE)	+ 0:10.03
6	Marco Aurelio Fontana (ITA)	+ 0:10.08
7	Sven Vanthourenhout (BEL)	+ 0:10.76
8	Christian Heule (SUI)	+ 0:12.20
9	John Gadret (FRA)	+ 0:12.30
10	Klaas Vantornout (BEL)	+ 0:12.86
11	Kevin Pauwels (BEL)	+ 0:18.62
12	Richard Groenendaal (NED)	+ 0:18.68
13	Enrico Franzoi (ITA)	+ 0:19.60
14	Bart Aernouts (BEL)	+ 0:20.43
15	Bart Wellens (BEL)	+ 0:21.93
16	Simon Zahner (SUI)	+ 0:22.43
17	Gerben De Knegt (NED)	+ 0:27.29
18	Marek Cichosz (POL)	+ 0:27.41
19	Milan Barenyi (SVK)	+ 0:28.50
20	Wilant Van Gils (NED)	+ 0:31.50
21	Marco Bianco (ITA)	+ 0:37.71
22	Isaac Suarez Fernandez (ESP)	+ 0:40.87
23	Jonathan Page (USA)	+ 0:41.29
24	Steve Chainel (FRA)	+ 0:49.52
25	José Antonio Hermida (ESP)	+ 1:00.34
26	Timothy Johnson (USA)	+ 1:02.75
27	Jeremy Powers (USA)	+ 1:11.31
28	David Derepas (FRA)	+ 1:19.90
29	Pirmin Lang (SUI)	+ 1:26.15
30	Dieter Vanthourenhout (BEL)	+ 1:37.50
31	Malte Urban (GER)	+ 1:51.22
32	Kamil Ausbuher (CZE)	+ 2:07.86
33	Alessandro Gambino (ITA)	+ 2:24.67
34	Robert Glajza (SVK)	+ 2:24.69
35	Luca Damiani (ITA)	+ 2:30.48
36	Javier Ruiz De Larrinaga Ibanez (ESP)	+ 2:34.28
37	Marcel Wildhaber (SUI)	+ 2:41.08
38	Finn Heitmann (GER)	+ 2:52.66
39	Maroš Kováč (SVK)	+ 3:24.79
40	Magnus Darvell (SWE)	+ 3:25.97
41	Nicolas Bazin (FRA)	+ 3:36.64
42	Gusty Bausch (LUX)	+ 3:46.72
43	Julien Belgy (FRA)	+ 4:02.88
44	Thijs Al (NED)	+ 4:09.77
45	Michael Müller (SUI)	+ 4:20.48
46	Mariusz Gil (POL)	+ 4:21.51
47	René Birkenfeld (GER)	+ 4:32.35
48	Mike Garrigan (CAN)	+ 4:33.77
49	Johannes Sickmueller (GER)	+ 4:36.89
50	Vaclav Metlicka (SVK)	+ 4:45.19
51	Robert Jebb (GBR)	+ 4:45.52
52	Paul Oldham (GBR)	+ 4:54.20
53	Fredrik Ericsson (SWE)	+ 5:10.13
54	Joachim Parbo (DEN)	+ 5:20.21
55	Unai Yus Kerejeta (ESP)	+ 5:57.00
56	Aaron Schooler (CAN)	+ 6:45.51
57	Keiichi Tsujiura (JPN)	+ 7:16.35
58	Jens Westergren (SWE)	+ 7:39.30
59	Osmond Bakker (CAN)	+ 7:39.65
60	Zdeněk Mlynář (CZE)	– 1 LAP
61	Martin Vestby (NOR)	– 2 LAPS
62	Masanori Kosaka (JPN)	– 3 LAPS

2 riders, Francis Mourey and Maarten Nijland abandoned the race.

== Fastest Laps ==
Lap	Cyclist	Time
1.	Marco Aurelio Fontana (ITA)	7:06
2.	Enrico Franzoi (ITA)	7:09
3.	Enrico Franzoi (ITA)	7:09
4.	José Antonio Hermida (ESP)	7:15
5.	Milan Barenyi (SVK)	7:10
6.	Zdeněk Štybar (CZE)	7:04
7.	Timothy Johnson (USA)	7:15
8.	Sven Vanthourenhout (BEL)	7:14
9.	Lars Boom (NED)	6:51
