= 2014 UCI Cyclo-cross World Championships – Men's elite race =

Men's Elite Cyclo-cross Race
2014 UCI Cyclo-cross World Championships
- Rainbow jersey

Race details
- Dates: 2 February 2014
- Stages: 1
- Distance: 27.2 km (16.90 mi)
- Winning time: 1h 05' 30"

Medalists
	Gold	Zdeněk Štybar (Czech Republic)
	Silver	Sven Nys (Belgium)
	Bronze	Kevin Pauwels (Belgium)

This event was held on 2 February 2014 as part of the 2014 UCI Cyclo-cross World Championships in Hoogerheide, Netherlands. Participants must be men born in 1991 or before. It was won by Zdeněk Štybar of Czech Republic.

== Race report ==
Sven Nys of Belgium was the big favourite before the race, having dominated the races of the month leading up to it. Beside him were Lars van der Haar of Netherlands, winner of the World Cup, and Belgian Tom Meeusen, the only one to somewhat keep equal footing to Nys as well as winner of the last World Cup race (where Nys did not participate). Outsiders were Francis Mourey of France as well as other Belgians: Niels Albert, winner in Hoogerheide in the 2009 World Championship, Kevin Pauwels, always good on fast and dry tracks, and Klaas Vantornout, silver medal the year before in Louisville. The big unknown factor was Czech Republic's Zdeněk Štybar. Touted by Nys as being his main opponent, the World Champion of 2010 and 2011 had only taken part in six races during the season and was only taking part in the World Championship as an aside in his preparation for the road season. Due to his bad place in the UCI ranking, Štybar was only placed on the fourth start row.

The race started with Mourey immediately trying one of his fast attacks. Behind him the Czech Martin Bína took a tumble, holding up the entire pack, and gave Mourey a few seconds for free which he quickly lost again. Albert had a usual terrible start and never recovered. Štybar on the other hand had an amazing start, joining the head of the race halfway the first lap and, showing off his great form, attacked from the head of the race by the end of the first lap.

Only Nys, van der Haar and Mourey were able to follow. Mourey didn't last much longer though, as he got dropped on Štybar's next attack. Van der Haar also had trouble with the pace of the two others and halfway through the race it was clear he too would have to settle with aiming at the podium. Either Nys or Štybar was going to win their third rainbow jersey.

They stayed closely together until the second to last lap when Štybar slipped and Nys gained a gap of a few seconds. It didn't last long however as Nys also fell while taking a turn and the two of them went into their last lap together. Štybar managed to get ahead of Nys in a section he knew Nys to be better at. A smart move as it turned out, Nys had to get off his bike after badly taking a turn, giving Štybar a six-second lead. Nys managed to bring that down to four seconds, but then, realizing he wasn't going to close that gap in the final fast section of the race, threw his towel in the ring. Štybar won his third title, Nys was content with what he still achieved at his age.

Meanwhile, in the back, a lot had happened in the battle for bronze. Van der Haar looked like he would be getting his second bronze in a row for quite a while, but then he got passed by Vantornout who, in his turn, got passed by Pauwels later in the race. Van der Haar dropped even further after that as Meeusen also passed him to take the fifth spot.

== Results ==
Rank	Cyclist	Time
Gold medal	Zdeněk Štybar (CZE)	1h 05' 29"
Silver medal	Sven Nys (BEL)	+ 12"
Bronze medal	Kevin Pauwels (BEL)	+ 40"
4	Klaas Vantornout (BEL)	+ 59"
5	Tom Meeusen (BEL)	+ 1' 07"
6	Lars van der Haar (NED)	+ 1' 22"
7	Rob Peeters (BEL)	+ 1' 43"
8	Francis Mourey (FRA)	+ 1' 53"
9	Radomír Šimůnek (CZE)	+ 2' 04"
10	Wietse Bosmans (BEL)	+ 2' 11"
11	Philipp Walsleben (GER)	+ 2' 27"
12	Corné Van Kessel (NED)	+ 2' 29"
13	Enrico Franzoi (ITA)	+ 2' 29"
14	Julien Taramarcaz (SUI)	+ 2' 29"
15	Nicolas Bazin (FRA)	+ 2' 42"
16	Thijs Van Amerongen (NED)	+ 2' 45"
17	Marcel Wildhaber (SUI)	+ 2' 50"
18	Jonathan Page (USA)	+ 2' 55"
19	Eddy Van Ijzendoorn (NED)	+ 3' 03"
20	Niels Albert (BEL)	+ 3' 06"
21	Steve Chainel (FRA)	+ 3' 19"
22	Sascha Weber (GER)	+ 3' 35"
23	Niels Wubben (NED)	+ 3' 52"
24	Jeremy Powers (USA)	+ 4' 06"
25	Arnaud Grand (FRA)	+ 4' 15"
26	Thijs Al (NED)	+ 4' 15"
27	Fabien Canal (FRA)	+ 4' 36"
28	Simon Zahner (SUI)	+ 4' 36"
29	Ian Field (GBR)	+ 4' 38"
30	Bryan Falaschi (ITA)	+ 4' 45"
31	Ryan Trebon (USA)	+ 4' 56"
32	Marcel Meisen (GER)	+ 5' 11"
33	Javier Ruiz de Larrinaga (ESP)	+ 5' 35"
34	Guillaume Perrot (FRA)	+ 5' 45"
35	Michael Schweizer (GER)	+ 5' 51"
36	Lubomir Petrus (CZE)	+ 5' 53"
37	Yu Takenouchi (JPN)	+ 5' 54"
38	Martin Haring (SVK)	+ 5' 59"
39	Aitor Hernández (ESP)	+ 6' 13"
40	Calle Friberg (SWE)	+ 6' 17"
41	Mariusz Gil (POL)	+ 6' 31"
42	Vladimir Kyzivat (CZE)	+ 7' 02"
43	Martin Loo (EST)	1 LAP
44	Kenneth Hansen (DEN)	1 LAP
45	Christian Helmig (LUX)	1 LAP
46	David Fletcher (GBR)	1 LAP
47	Robert Gavenda (SVK)	1 LAP
48	Allen Krughoff (USA)	1 LAP
49	Mike Garrigan (CAN)	2 LAPS
50	Magnus Darvell (SWE)	2 LAPS
51	Hikaru Kosaka (JPN)	2 LAPS
52	Alexander Revell (NZL)	2 LAPS
53	Angus Edmond (NZL)	3 LAPS
54	Aaron Schooler (CAN)	3 LAPS
55	Nick Both (AUS)	3 LAPS
56	Morten Vaeng (NOR)	4 LAPS
57	David Quist (NOR)	5 LAPS
	Zach McDonald (USA)	DNF4
	Ondrej Bambula (CZE)	DNF3
	Timothy Johnson (USA)	DNF2
	Martin Bina (CZE)	DNF1
