= 2011 UCI Cyclo-cross World Championships – Men's elite race =

Men's Elite Cyclo-cross Race
2011 UCI Cyclo-cross World Championships
- Rainbow jersey

Race details
- Dates: January 30, 2011
- Stages: 1
- Winning time: 1h 06' 37"

Medalists
	Gold	Zdeněk Štybar (CZE)
	Silver	Sven Nys (BEL)
	Bronze	Kevin Pauwels (BEL)

This event was held on Sunday 30 January 2011 as part of the 2011 UCI Cyclo-cross World Championships in Sankt Wendel, Germany.

== Ranking ==
Rank	Cyclist	Time
Gold medal	Zdenek Stybar (CZE)	1:06:37
Silver medal	Sven Nys (BEL)	+ 0:18
Bronze medal	Kevin Pauwels (BEL)	+ 1:15
4	Francis Mourey (FRA)	+ 1:16
5	Philipp Walsleben (GER)	+ 1:18
6	Klaas Vantornout (BEL)	+ 1:23
7	Marco Aurelio Fontana (ITA)	+ 1:51
8	Bart Wellens (BEL)	+ 2:01
9	Christian Heule (SUI)	+ 2:03
10	Tom Meeusen (BEL)	+ 2:03
11	Gerben De Knegt (NED)	+ 2:03
12	Jonathan Page (USA)	+ 2:04
13	John Gadret (FRA)	+ 2:14
14	Petr Dlask (CZE)	+ 2:16
15	Steve Chainel (FRA)	+ 2:32
16	Jeremy Powers (USA)	+ 2:35
17	Bart Aernouts (BEL)	+ 2:38
18	Marcel Wildhaber (SUI)	+ 2:39
19	Mariusz Gil (POL)	+ 2:54
20	José Antonio Hermida (ESP)	+ 2:55
21	Egoitz Murgoitio Rekalde (ESP)	+ 3:55
22	Martin Zlamalik (CZE)	+ 3:56
23	Christoph Pfingsten (GER)	+ 4:16
24	Niels Albert (BEL)	+ 4:28
25	Sascha Weber (GER)	+ 4:31
26	Emil Lindgren (SWE)	+ 4:33
27	James Driscoll (USA)	+ 4:57
28	Ondrej Bambula (CZE)	+ 5:00
29	Javier Ruiz De Larrinaga Ibanez (ESP)	+ 5:00
30	Thijs Van Amerongen (NED)	+ 5:01
31	Cristian Cominelli (ITA)	Lapped
32	Isaac Suarez Fernandez (ESP)	"
33	Magnus Darvell (SWE)	"
34	Ian Field (GBR)	"
35	Marek Cichosz (POL)	"
36	Eddy Van Ijzendoorn (NED)	"
37	Johannes Sickmueller (GER)	"
38	Jody Crawforth (GBR)	"
39	René Birkenfeld (GER)	"
40	Vladimir Kyzivat (CZE)	"
41	Milan Barenyi (SVK)	"
42	Gusty Bausch (LUX)	"
43	David Kasek (CZE)	"
44	Paul Oldham (GBR)	"
45	Jens Westergren (SWE)	"
46	Craig Richey (CAN)	"
47	Robert Gavenda (SVK)	"
48	Marco Bianco (ITA)	"
49	Vaclav Metlicka (SVK)	"
50	Atsushi Maruyama (JPN)	"
51	Derrick St John (CAN)	"
52	Roland Mörx (AUT)	"
53	Tommy Nielsen (DEN)	"
54	Keiichi Tsujiura (JPN)	"
