= 2010 UCI Cyclo-cross World Championships – Men's elite race =

Men's Elite Cyclo-cross Race
2010 UCI Cyclo-cross World Championships
- Rainbow jersey

Race details
- Dates: January 31, 2010
- Stages: 1
- Distance: 28.06 km (17.44 mi)
- Winning time: 1h 08' 58"

Medalists
	Gold	Zdeněk Štybar (CZE)
	Silver	Klaas Vantornout (BEL)
	Bronze	Sven Nys (BEL)

This race was held on January 31, 2010 as the main and closing event of the 2010 UCI Cyclo-cross World Championships in Tábor, Czech Republic. Zdeněk Štybar got his first title in the Men's Elite category. The length of the course was 28.06 km (0.16 km + 9 laps of 3.10 km each).

== Ranking ==
Rank	Cyclist	Time
Gold medal	Zdeněk Štybar (CZE)	1:08:58
Silver medal	Klaas Vantornout (BEL)	+ 0:21
Bronze medal	Sven Nys (BEL)	+ 0:38
4	Martin Bína (CZE)	+ 0:40
5	Francis Mourey (FRA)	+ 0:56
6	Martin Zlámalík (CZE)	+ 1:02
7	Christian Heule (SUI)	+ 1:07
8	Radomír Šimůnek (CZE)	+ 1:18
9	Gerben De Knegt (NED)	+ 1:49
10	Bart Wellens (BEL)	+ 2:13
11	Marco Aurelio Fontana (ITA)	+ 2:25
12	Nicolas Bazin (FRA)	+ 2:26
13	Steve Chainel (FRA)	+ 2:28
14	Timothy Johnson (USA)	+ 2:28
15	Marcel Wildhaber (SUI)	+ 2:37
16	Erwin Vervecken (BEL)	+ 2:45
17	Thijs Van Amerongen (NED)	+ 2:47
18	Marco Bianco (ITA)	+ 2:54
19	James Driscoll (USA)	+ 3:07
20	Lukas Flückiger (SUI)	+ 3:09
21	John Gadret (FRA)	+ 3:11
22	Isaac Suarez Fernandez (ESP)	+ 3:13
23	Laurent Colombatto (FRA)	+ 3:14
24	Christoph Pfingsten (GER)	+ 3:17
25	Kevin Pauwels (BEL)	+ 3:29
26	José Antonio Hermida (ESP)	+ 3:32
27	Fabio Ursi (ITA)	+ 3:34
28	Jean-Pierre Drucker (LUX)	+ 3:42
29	Kamil Ausbuher (CZE)	+ 3:52
30	Jonathan Page (USA)	+ 4:05
31	Joachim Parbo (DEN)	+ 4:15
32	Thijs Al (NED)	+ 4:15
33	Ondřej Bambula (CZE)	+ 4:21
34	Peter Presslauer (AUT)	+ 4:31
35	Ian Field (GBR)	+ 4:43
36	Milan Barenyi (SVK)	+ 4:50
37	Bart Aernouts (BEL)	+ 4:56
38	Petr Dlask (CZE)	+ 4:57
39	Johannes Sickmueller (GER)	+ 4:59
40	Gusty Bausch (LUX)	+ 5:00
41	Jeremy Powers (USA)	+ 5:13
42	Paul Oldham (GBR)	+ 5:33
43	Wilant Van Gils (NED)	+ 6:07
44	Jody Crawforth (GBR)	+ 6:12
45	Javier Ruiz De Larrinaga Ibanez (ESP)	+ 6:19
46	Constantino Zaballa Gutierrez (ESP)	+ 6:37
47	Luca Damiani (ITA)	+ 6:48
48	Vaclav Metlicka (SVK)	+ 6:50
49	Keiichi Tsujiura (JPN)	+ 7:27
50	Ryan Trebon (USA)	+ 7:37
51	Martin Haring (SVK)	+ 8:39
52	Robert Glajza (SVK)	Lapped
53	Rodger Aiken (IRL)	Lapped
54	Szilard Buruczki (HUN)	Lapped
55	Boldbaatar Bold-Erdene (MGL)	Lapped
56	Ariunbold Naranbat (MGL)	Lapped
57	Dror Pekatch (ISR)	Lapped
58	George-Daniel Anghelache (ROU)	Lapped
