= Lars Boom =

Dutch racing cyclist

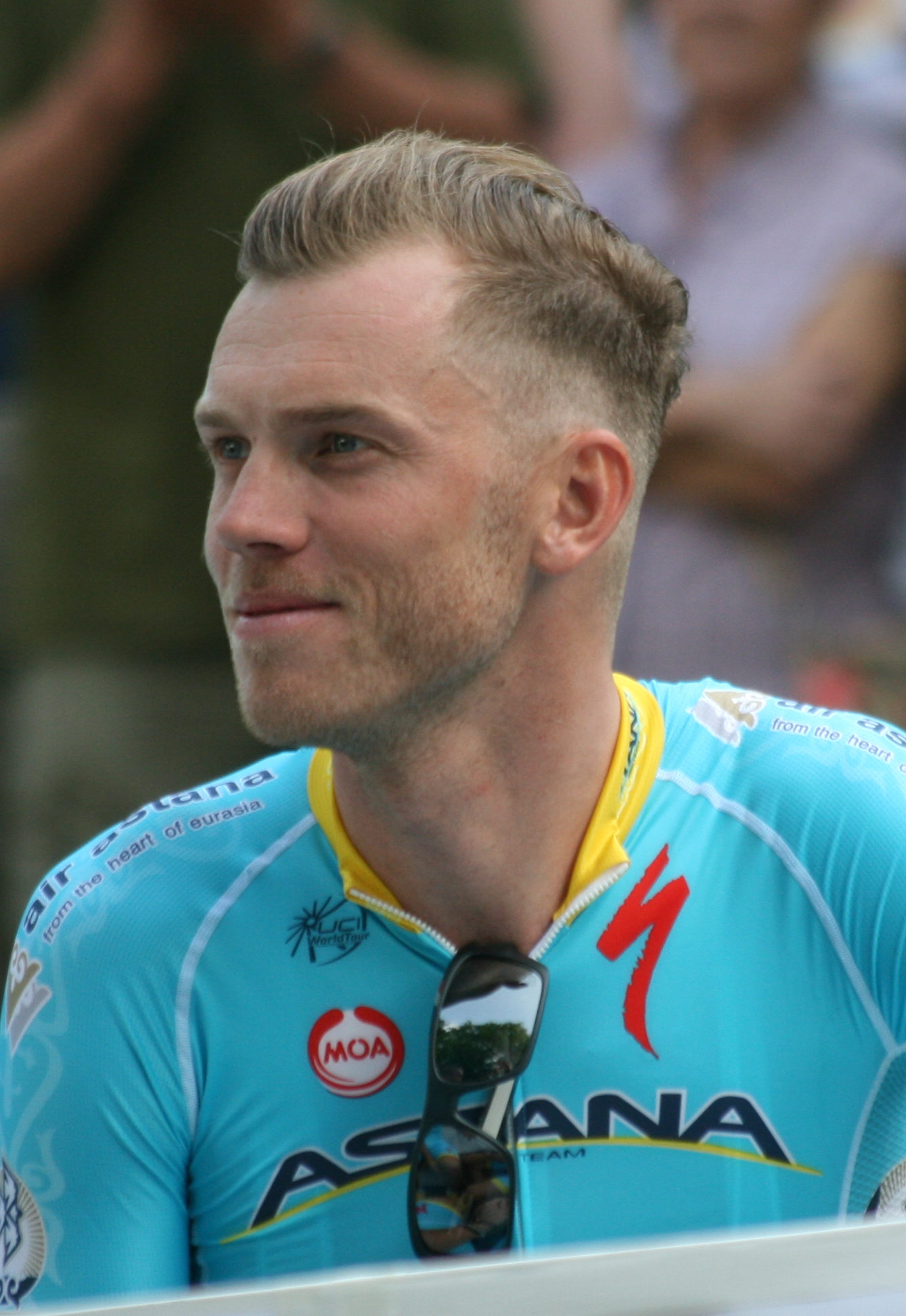
- Lars Boom at the 2015 Tour de France

Personal information
- Full name: Lars Anthonius Johannes Boom
- Born: 30 December 1985 (age 40) Vlijmen, the Netherlands
- Height: 1.91 m (6 ft 3 in)
- Weight: 75 kg (165 lb)

Cycling career
- Sport: Cycling
- Current team: Privateer
- Disciplines: Cyclo-cross; Road (retired); Mountain biking
- Role: Rider
- Rider type: Cyclo-cross; Time-trialist/Classics specialist (road); Marathon (MTB)

Amateur teams
- 2002–2003: Rabobank Junior
- 2020–: Privateer

Professional teams
- 2004–2008: Rabobank GS3
- 2009–2014: Rabobank
- 2015–2016: Astana
- 2017–2018: LottoNL–Jumbo
- 2019: Roompot–Charles

Major wins
- Cyclo-cross World Championships (2008) National Championships (2007–2012) UCI World Cup 6 individual wins (2007–08, 2008–09, 2010–11) Road Grand Tours Tour de France 1 individual stage (2014) Vuelta a España 1 individual stage (2009) Stage races Tour of Britain (2011, 2017) Eneco Tour (2012) Tour of Belgium (2009) Ster ZLM Toer (2013) One-day races and Classics National Road Race Championships (2008) National Time Trial Championships (2008)
Medal record
Representing the Netherlands
Men's road bicycle racing
World Championships
Gold medal – first place	2007 Stuttgart	Under-23 time trial
Men's cyclo-cross
World Championships
Gold medal – first place	2003 Monopoli	Junior
Gold medal – first place	2007 Hooglede	Under-23
Gold medal – first place	2008 Treviso	Elite
Silver medal – second place	2006 Zeddam	Under-23

Lars Anthonius Johannes Boom (born 30 December 1985) is a professional cyclo-cross and mountain bike racing cyclist from the Netherlands. He has also competed professionally in road racing, having raced between 2004 and 2019.

Born in Vlijmen, Netherlands, Boom has also previously competed for Rabobank and their junior and continental teams over two spells with the team, as well as Astana. Boom won the cyclo-cross world championships in 2008. He has also been the Dutch national cyclo-cross champion in his discipline from 2001 to 2012 – junior cyclo-cross champion from 2002 to 2003, under-23 champion from 2004 to 2006, and the elite champion from 2007 to 2012.

== Career ==
=== Rabobank Continental (2003–2008) ===
During the 2005–2006 cyclocross season, Boom who just turned 20 years of age, scored several wins including a win ahead of Sven Nys in the Grand Prix Sven Nys as well as the win in the Vlaamse Druivenveldrit Overijse after Bart Wellens was disqualified for having kicked a spectator. Boom was beaten by Zdeněk Štybar in a sprint for the Under 23 World Championships but returned a year later to dominate the race and to win the Under 23 World Champion jersey.

For the 2006–2007 season, Boom asked and received special dispensation to ride the Dutch Elite Cyclo Cross championships and became Champion of the Netherlands. In addition to Boom's successes in cyclo-cross, he has achieved success on the road and has won several stage races such as the Tour de Bretagne. In September 2007, Boom became Under 23 World Time Trial champion beating Russian Mikhail Ignatiev. In November 2007, Boom won the Gerrit Schulte Trophy as the Dutch cyclist of the year for his two World Championship wins. In the 2007–2008 Cyclo-cross season, Boom won a World Cup event in Pijnacker, a Gazet van Antwerpen event in Loenhout and then became Dutch Elite National cyclo-cross champion for the second time. After that, he also won the World Cup races in Liévin and Hoogerheide. He went into the world championships in Treviso 2008 as big favourite and did not fail, he won the race and became the second rider after Radomír Šimůnek to win the world title in all categories (Junior, Espoir and Elite).

During the 2008 road season, Boom continued his progression on the road despite a successful cyclocross season. On his third day of racing on the road, he won the third stage of the Tour de Bretagne in Fréhel. Boom also won the sixth stage time trial. Boom then dominated the oldest stage race in the Netherlands – the Olympia's Tour. After competing in two stage races in Spain in which he won the first and won three stages in the second, Boom returned to the Netherlands where he won the Dutch national road race championships for elite riders. He would win the national time trial title several weeks later after which he announced that he intended on switching focus from cyclo-cross to road racing after the 2008/09 cyclo-cross season.

=== Rabobank (2009–2014) ===
In 2009 Boom won the Tour of Belgium after a strong performance uphill, and in the final Time Trial. In his first Vuelta a España, he was part of a break of 12 riders in the 15th stage. He rode away on the final climb and took the stage, making him the first Dutchman to win a stage in a Grand Tour since 2005.

Boom started the 2010 season by winning the Dutch national cyclocross championships. This was only his second and last cross of the season he rode. In the prologue of Paris–Nice he bested time-trial giants Jens Voigt, Levi Leipheimer, Alberto Contador and David Millar. During the winter of 2010–2011 Boom made a short return to cyclocross, he won the World Cup race in Zolder and won for the fifth consecutive time the Dutch national cyclocross championships. In 2011 he was again the fastest in a prologue of a World Tour event: the Critérium du Dauphiné. Later that year he won two stages and the general classification in the Tour of Britain.

Boom won the Dutch Cyclocross Championship for the sixth consecutive time in January 2012, extending his consecutive streak record.

In 2014 Boom won the fifth stage of the Tour de France, a stage marked by difficulty due to wet conditions and significant sections of cobblestones. The stage was his first win of 2014 and came nine years to the day after the previous victory by a Dutch rider (Pieter Weening) in the Tour de France.

=== Astana (2015–2016) ===
Subsequently, Boom announced that he would be leaving Belkin and joining Astana for the 2015 and 2016 seasons.

Coming into the Tour de France, Boom's notable results of the 2015 campaign were fourth in Paris–Roubaix and sixth in the Tour of Flanders. There was some controversy at the beginning of the Tour, as Boom's cortisol levels were too low in his blood per MPCC rules to participate in a cycling event, but the Astana management decided to field him anyway. Boom blamed his asthma inhaler for his low cortisol levels.

=== LottoNL–Jumbo (2017–2018) ===
After two seasons with Astana, Boom announced in August 2016 he would be joining LottoNL–Jumbo.

In January 2018 Boom had a successful heart surgery to treat a cardiac arrhythmia. Boom returned to racing for the Paris–Nice in March.

In May 2018, Boom was expelled from the Tour of Norway for aggression against Belgian rider Preben Van Hecke. Video images showed some kind of incident where Van Hecke had to brake and Boom was upset about this. He overtook Van Hecke and punched him and attacked his helmet during the race. On 2 July, the UCI suspended him for a month, missing the Tour de France as a result.

=== Retirement from road racing ===
In December 2019, Boom announced that he was retiring from road racing after being unable to find a contract for 2020, due to his Roompot–Charles team folding at the end of the season.

He was a directeur sportif for UCI Women's World Tour team Liv Racing for the 2021 season and for SD Worx from 2022 to 2024. For the 2025 season he joined FDJ–Suez.

== Major results ==
=== Cyclo-cross ===
2001–2002
1st National Junior Championships
2002–2003
1st UCI World Junior Championships
1st National Junior Championships
1st Overall Junior Superprestige

1st Sint-Michielsgestel
1st Gavere
1st Gieten
1st Diegem
1st Hoogstraten
1st Harnes
3rd Vorselaar

2003–2004
1st National Under-23 Championships
UCI Under-23 World Cup

1st Koksijde
3rd Nommay

2004–2005
1st UEC European Under-23 Championships
1st National Under-23 Championships
3rd Overall Under-23 Superprestige

1st Ruddervoorde
2nd Hamme
3rd Gieten

2005–2006
1st National Under-23 Championships
1st Overijse
Gazet van Antwerpen

1st Baal

UCI Under-23 World Cup

1st Hoogerheide

2nd UCI World Under-23 Championships
Superprestige

3rd Gieten

2006–2007
1st UCI World Under-23 Championships
1st National Championships
UCI Under-23 World Cup

1st Hoogerheide
2nd Nommay

1st Heerlen
Gazet van Antwerpen

2nd Baal

3rd Eeklo
2007–2008
1st UCI World Championships
1st National Championships
UCI World Cup

1st Pijnacker
1st Liévin
1st Hoogerheide
3rd Tábor
3rd Koksijde
3rd Hofstade

Gazet van Antwerpen

1st Loenhout
2nd Niel
2nd Essen
3rd Oostmalle

1st Mechelen
1st Zeddam
2nd Heerlen
Superprestige

3rd Gieten

2008–2009
1st National Championships
UCI World Cup

1st Pijnacker
1st Nommay
2nd Milan

Gazet van Antwerpen

1st Niel
2nd Koppenberg

1st Surhuisterveen
Superprestige

2nd Veghel-Eerde

2nd Overijse
2nd Woerden
2009–2010
1st National Championships
2010–2011
1st National Championships
UCI World Cup

1st Heusden-Zolder

1st Leudelange
2011–2012
1st National Championships
2012–2013
2nd National Championships
2016–2017
2nd Surhuisterveen

==== UCI World Cup results ====
Season	1	2	3	4	5	6	7	8	9	Rank	Points
2007–2008	KAL; 18	TAB; 3	PIJ; 1	KOK; 3	IGO —	MIL —	HOF; 3	LIE; 1	HOO; 1	n/a	n/a
2008–2009	KAL; 10	TAB; 9	PIJ; 1	KOK —	IGO —	NOM; 1	ZOL; 4	ROU; 6	MIL; 2	5	426
2010–2011	AIG —	PLZ —	KOK —	IGO —	KAL —	ZOL; 1	PON —	HOO —		41	80
2011–2012	PLZ —	TAB —	KOK —	IGO —	NAM; 28	ZOL; 7	LIE —	HOO —		45	71
2015–2016	LAS —	VAL —	KOK —	NAM —	ZOL; 43	LIG —	HOO —			88	8
2016–2017	LAS —	IOW —	VAL —	KOK; NH	ZEV —	NAM —	ZOL; 11	FIU; DNF	HOO —	59	40

=== Road ===
2004
1st Stage 2 Triptyque Ardennais
3rd Overall Circuit de Lorraine
2005
1st Young rider classification, Triptyque des Barrages
1st Stage 2 Grand Prix de la Somme
2nd Overall Hessen-Rundfahrt
10th Grand Prix de la ville de Pérenchies
2006
1st Overall Volta ao Distrito de Santarém

1st Stage 3 (ITT)

1st Overall Le Triptyque des Monts et Châteaux

1st Stage 2 (ITT)

1st Stage 3a (ITT) Thüringen Rundfahrt der U23
2nd Time trial, National Under-23 Championships
2007
1st Time trial, UCI World Under-23 Championships
1st Time trial, National Under-23 Championships
1st Overall Tour de Bretagne

1st Young rider classification
1st Prologue & Stage 5 (ITT)

1st Omloop der Kempen
1st Prologue Tour de Normandie
3rd Overall Volta ao Distrito de Santarém
3rd Overall Tour du Poitou-Charentes
4th Overall Olympia's Tour

1st Prologue, Stages 4 & 6 (ITT)

6th Grand Prix de la Somme
2008
National Championships

1st Road race
1st Time trial

1st Overall Olympia's Tour

1st Stages 7 (ITT) & 8

1st Overall Volta a Lleida

1st Stage 8

Circuito Montañés

1st Stages 1, 5a (ITT) & 7

Tour de Bretagne

1st Stages 3 & 6 (ITT)

1st Stage 4 Vuelta Ciclista a León
2009
1st Overall Tour of Belgium
1st Stage 15 Vuelta a España
7th Overall Sachsen Tour
2010
1st Grote Prijs Jef Scherens
1st Prologue Paris–Nice
3rd Road race, National Championships
5th E3 Prijs Vlaanderen
6th Overall Eneco Tour
2011
1st Overall Tour of Britain

1st Stages 3 & 6

1st Prologue Critérium du Dauphiné
1st Prologue Tour of Qatar
1st Stage 1 (TTT) Tirreno–Adriatico
9th Gent–Wevelgem
10th Omloop Het Nieuwsblad
2012
1st Overall Eneco Tour
2nd Overall Ster ZLM Toer

1st Stage 3

National Championships

2nd Road race
2nd Time trial

2nd Ronde van Zeeland Seaports
5th Road race, UCI World Championships
6th Paris–Roubaix
2013
1st Overall Ster ZLM Toer

1st Stage 4

1st Profronde van Heerlen
1st Profronde van Zevenbergen
1st Points classification, Eneco Tour
1st Stage 2 (ITT) Tour Méditerranéen
2nd Overall Tour du Haut Var

1st Stage 2

3rd Profronde van Oostvoorne
4th Binche–Chimay–Binche
2014
1st Stage 5 Tour de France
2nd Overall Eneco Tour
2015
1st Stage 1 Danmark Rundt
4th Paris–Roubaix
6th Tour of Flanders
2016
6th E3 Harelbeke
2017
1st Overall Tour of Britain

1st Stage 5 (ITT)

4th Veenendaal–Veenendaal Classic
8th Overall BinckBank Tour

1st Stage 5

2019
4th Le Samyn
8th Clásica de Almería

==== Grand Tour general classification results timeline ====
Grand Tour	2009	2010	2011	2012	2013	2014	2015	2016	2017	2018
Giro d'Italia	Did not contest during career									
Tour de France	—	130	DNF	—	105	97	DNF	—	—	—
Vuelta a España	55	—	—	107	—	—	—	—	—	153

==== Monuments results timeline ====
Monument	2009	2010	2011	2012	2013	2014	2015	2016	2017	2018	2019
Milan–San Remo	—	94	112	32	—	—	51	25	—	—	—
Tour of Flanders	—	76	37	DNF	11	93	6	11	97	—	DNF
Paris–Roubaix	—	OTL	12	6	14	37	4	DNF	DNF	—	74
Liège–Bastogne–Liège	—	—	—	DNF	—	—	—	—	—	—	—
Giro di Lombardia	100	—	—	—	—	—	—	—	—	—	—

Legend
—	Did not compete
DNF	Did not finish

=== Mountain bike ===
2017
1st Marathon, National Championships
2018
1st Beach race, UEC European Championships
1st Marathon, National Championships
2019
2nd Marathon, National Championships

== See also ==
- List of Dutch Olympic cyclists

Sporting positions
Preceded by Koos Moerenhout	Dutch National Road Race Championships; Winner; 2008	Succeeded by Koos Moerenhout
Preceded by Stef Clement	Dutch National Time Trial Championships; Winner; 2008	Succeeded by Stef Clement
