= 2011–12 UCI Cyclo-cross World Cup =

Bicycle racing competition

2011–2012 UCI Cyclo-cross World Cup
Details
- Dates: 16 October 2011 – 22 January 2012
- Location: Europe
- Races: 8

Champions
- Male individual champion: Kevin Pauwels (Belgium)
- Female individual champion: Daphny van den Brand (Netherlands)

The 2011–2012 UCI Cyclo-cross World Cup events and season-long competition took place between 16 October 2011 and 22 January 2012, sponsored by the Union Cycliste Internationale (UCI).

== Events ==
Date	Venue	Elite men's winner	Elite women's winner	Website
16 October	(Czech Republic) Plzeň	Sven Nys (BEL)	Katie Compton (USA)	
23 October	(Czech Republic) Tábor	Kevin Pauwels (BEL)	Kateřina Nash (CZE)	
26 November	(Belgium) Koksijde	Sven Nys (BEL)	Daphny van den Brand (NED)	
4 December	(Spain) Igorre	Kevin Pauwels (BEL)	No race scheduled	
18 December	(Belgium) Namur	Sven Nys (BEL)	Marianne Vos (NED)	
26 December	(Belgium) Heusden-Zolder	Kevin Pauwels (BEL)	Marianne Vos (NED)	
15 January	(France) Liévin	Zdeněk Štybar (CZE)	Marianne Vos (NED)	
22 January	(Netherlands) Hoogerheide	Kevin Pauwels (BEL)	Daphny van den Brand (NED)	

== Men's Ranking ==
Pos.	Name	Points
1	Kevin Pauwels (BEL)	590
2	Sven Nys (BEL)	540
3	Zdeněk Štybar (CZE)	525
4	Klaas Vantornout (BEL)	450
5	Tom Meeusen (BEL)	373
6	Francis Mourey (FRA)	363
7	Bart Aernouts (BEL)	360
8	Steve Chainel (FRA)	319
9	Radomír Šimůnek (CZE)	306
10	Niels Albert (BEL)	300

== Women's Ranking ==
Pos.	Name	Points
1	Daphny van den Brand (NED)	326
2	Marianne Vos (NED)	290
3	Katie Compton (USA)	235
4	Lucie Chainel-Lefèvre (FRA)	231
5	Helen Wyman (GBR)	208
6	Sanne Cant (BEL)	203
7	Sanne van Paassen (NED)	180
8	Kateřina Nash (CZE)	166
9	Pavla Havlíková (CZE)	165
10	Nikki Harris (GBR)	144
