= 2017 Strade Bianche =

Cycling race

2017 UCI World Tour, race 5 of 37

Race details
- Dates: 4 March 2017
- Stages: 1
- Distance: 175 km (108.7 mi)
- Winning time: 4h 42' 42"

Results
	Winner	Michał Kwiatkowski (POL)	(Team Sky)
	Second	Greg Van Avermaet (BEL)	(BMC Racing Team)
	Third	Tim Wellens (BEL)	(Lotto–Soudal)

The 2017 Strade Bianche was a road cycling one-day race that took place on 4 March. It was the eleventh edition of the Strade Bianche and was the fifth event of the 2017 UCI World Tour. It was the first time that the race was included in the UCI World Tour calendar.

Poland's Michał Kwiatkowski (Team Sky) became the second rider, after Fabian Cancellara, to win multiple editions of the race, after attacking from a group of four race favourites with around 15 kilometres (9.3 miles) remaining and was able to solo away to the race victory. Second place was taken by Greg Van Avermaet for the BMC Racing Team fifteen seconds in arrears, while a further two seconds back in third place, Lotto–Soudal's Tim Wellens completed the podium.

== Teams ==
As a new event to the UCI World Tour, all UCI WorldTeams were invited to the race, but not obligated to compete in the race. However, all eighteen UCI WorldTeams elected to compete in the race, the first such occurrence in relation to the new-for-2017 races. Three UCI Professional Continental teams competed, completing the 21-team peloton.

UCI WorldTeams

- AG2R La Mondiale
- Astana
- Bahrain–Merida
- BMC Racing Team
- Bora–Hansgrohe
- Cannondale–Drapac
- Team Dimension Data
- FDJ
- Team Katusha–Alpecin
- LottoNL–Jumbo
- Lotto–Soudal
- Movistar Team
- Orica–Scott
- Quick-Step Floors
- Team Sky
- Team Sunweb
- Trek–Segafredo
- UAE Team Emirates

UCI Professional Continental teams

- Androni Giocattoli–Sidermec
- Bardiani–CSF
- Nippo–Vini Fantini

== Route ==
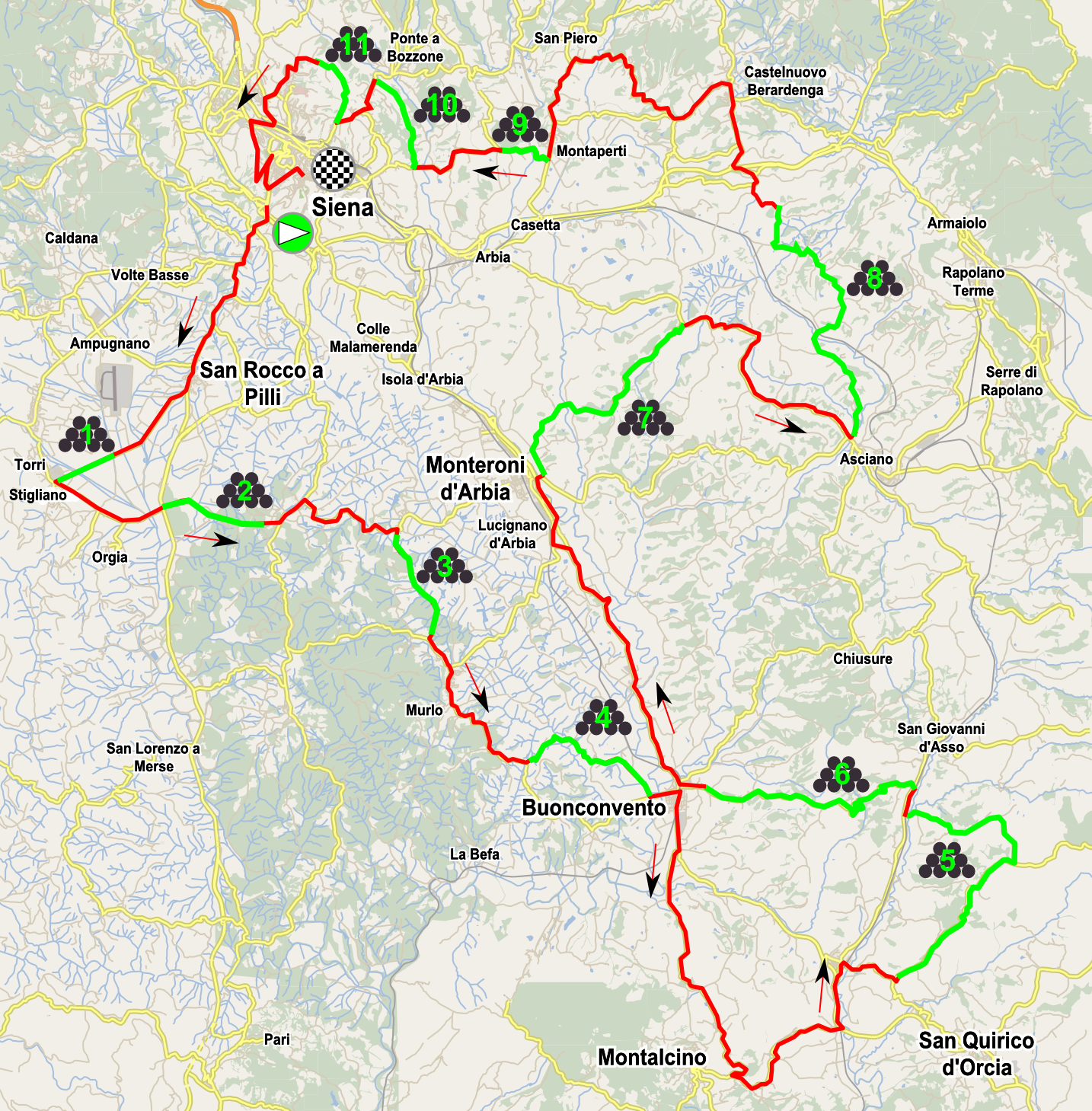
The 2017 route included 11 sectors of strade bianche, for a total of 61.9 kilometres (38.5 miles).

The race started and finished in the UNESCO World Heritage Site of Siena, for the second successive year, prior to which the race started in San Gimignano. The distance was 175 kilometres (109 miles), run entirely within the southern Tuscan province of Siena. The Strade Bianche is particularly renowned for its sectors of strade bianche (English: white roads) or sterrati (English: dirt), which comprise large sections of the route.

The course ran over the hilly terrain of the Chianti region and included eleven sectors and a total of 61.9 kilometres (38.5 miles) – up from nine sectors and a total of 52.8 kilometres (32.8 miles) in 2016 – of dirt road. The two returning sectors come within the first 30 kilometres (19 miles), at Bagnaia and Radi. The first sector was addressed just 11.4 kilometres (7.1 miles) after the start; the longest and most arduous sectors were the ones in Lucignano d'Asso, 11.9 kilometres (7.4 miles) in length, and the 11.5 kilometres (7.1 miles)-long Monte Sante Marie.

The latter section was renamed in honour of Fabian Cancellara, following his third win in the race in 2016. The last stretch of gravel road came 13.3 kilometres (8.3 miles) from the finish in Siena. The race finished on Siena's illustrious Piazza del Campo, after a narrow ascent on the roughly-paved Via Santa Caterina in the heart of the medieval city, with steep stretches of up to 16% in gradient.

Sectors of strade bianche
No.	Name	Distance from		Length (km)	Category
No.	Name	Start (km)	Finish (km)	Length (km)	Category
1	Vidritta	11.4	163.6	2.1	*
2	Bagnaia	17.0	158.0	4.7	*
3	Radi	27.8	147.2	4.4	*
4	Commune di Murlo	38.5	136.5	5.5	*
5	Lucignano d'Asso	66.8	108.2	11.9	*
6	Pieve a Salti	79.7	95.3	8.0	*
7	San Martino in Grania	107.9	67.1	9.5	*
8	Monte Sante Marie Settore Cancellara	121.0	54.0	11.5	*
9	Monteaperti	150.7	24.3	0.8	*
10	Colle Pinzuto	155.6	19.4	2.4	*
11	Le Tolfe	161.7	13.3	1.1	*

== Result ==
Result
Rank	Rider	Team	Time
1	Michał Kwiatkowski (POL)	Team Sky	4h 42' 42"
2	Greg Van Avermaet (BEL)	BMC Racing Team	+ 15"
3	Tim Wellens (BEL)	Lotto–Soudal	+ 17"
4	Zdeněk Štybar (CZE)	Quick-Step Floors	+ 23"
5	Tom Dumoulin (NED)	Team Sunweb	+ 1' 26"
6	Luke Durbridge (AUS)	Orica–Scott	+ 1' 26"
7	Christopher Juul-Jensen (DEN)	Orica–Scott	+ 1' 29"
8	Tiesj Benoot (BEL)	Lotto–Soudal	+ 2' 20"
9	Thibaut Pinot (FRA)	FDJ	+ 2' 23"
10	Scott Thwaites (GBR)	Team Dimension Data	+ 2' 52"
