= Marco Bianco =

Marco Bianco may refer to:

- Marco Bianco (cyclist), Italian Cyclo-cross cyclist in 2011 UCI Cyclo-cross World Championships – Men's elite race etc.
- Marco Bianco (EastEnders), a character from the 2007 season of the British soap opera EastEnders
