= Zdeněk Štybar =

Czech cyclist

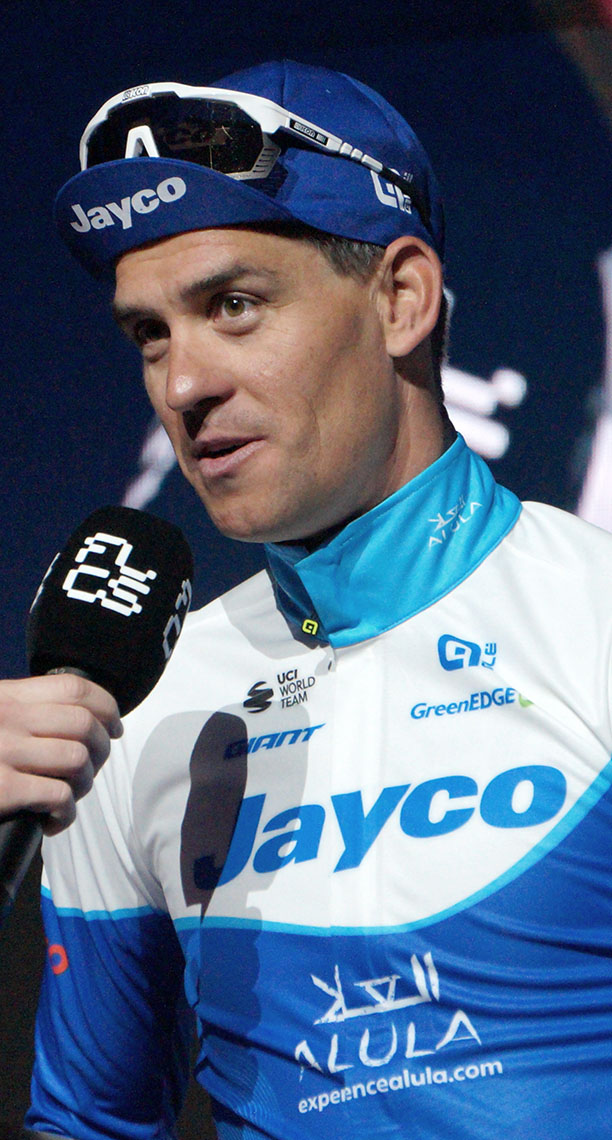
- Štybar at the 2023 Omloop Het Nieuwsblad

Personal information
- Nickname: Štyby
- Born: 11 December 1985 (age 40) Planá, Czechoslovakia
- Height: 1.83 m (6 ft 0 in)
- Weight: 100 kg (220 lb)

Cycling career
- Sport: Cycling
- Current team: Retired
- Disciplines: Road; Cyclo-cross
- Role: Rider
- Rider type: Classics specialist (Road)

Professional teams
- 2005–2011: Fidea
- 2011–2022: Quick-Step
- 2023: Team Jayco–AlUla

Major wins
- Cyclo-cross World Championships (2010, 2011, 2014) National Championships (2008–2013) World Cup (2009–10) 7 individual wins (2007–08, 2009–10, 2010–11, 2011–12) Superprestige (2009–10) Road Grand Tours Tour de France 1 individual stage (2015) Vuelta a España 1 individual stage (2013) Stage races Eneco Tour (2013) One-day races and Classics National Road Race Championships (2014, 2017) Omloop Het Nieuwsblad (2019) E3 BinckBank Classic (2019) Strade Bianche (2015)
Medal record
Representing Czech Republic
Men's cyclo-cross
UCI World Championships
Gold medal – first place	2010 Tábor	Men's race
Gold medal – first place	2011 Sankt Wendel	Men's race
Gold medal – first place	2014 Hoogerheide	Men's race
Gold medal – first place	2005 Sankt Wendel	Men's under-23 race
Gold medal – first place	2006 Zeddam	Men's under-23 race
Silver medal – second place	2008 Treviso	Men's race
Silver medal – second place	2009 Hoogerheide	Men's race
UEC European Championships
Silver medal – second place	2006 Huijbergen	Men's under-23 race
Bronze medal – third place	2005 Pontchâteau	Men's under-23 race

Zdeněk Štybar (Czech pronunciation: [ˈzdɛɲɛk ˈʃtɪbar]; born 11 December 1985) is a Czech former professional cyclist, who rode professionally in cyclo-cross and road bicycle racing between 2005 and 2024 for Telenet–Fidea, the Quick-Step Alpha Vinyl Team and Team Jayco–AlUla.

In the early part of his career, Štybar prioritised competing in cyclo-cross, where he won three world titles – in 2010, 2011 and 2014 – as well as six consecutive national titles and overall victories in both the 2009–10 UCI Cyclo-cross World Cup and the 2009–10 Cyclo-cross Superprestige. Signing for Quick-Step in 2011, Štybar competed more readily in road racing, ultimately winning Grand Tour stages at the 2013 Vuelta a España and the 2015 Tour de France, the Czech National Road Race Championships in 2014 and 2017, and multiple one-day races. Over his professional career, Štybar took more than 60 victories across both disciplines.

== Career ==
=== Early life and cyclo-cross career ===
Štybar was born in Planá. He won his first UCI Cyclo-cross World Cup race during the 2007–08 season at Kalmthout, and ultimately won the overall title in 2009–10. Following consecutive second places in the men's elite race at the UCI Cyclo-cross World Championships in 2008 and 2009, Štybar won the 2010 edition on home soil in Tábor. He then defended his title the following year in Sankt Wendel, Germany.

=== Quick-Step (2011–2022) ===
==== 2011–2013 ====
In March 2011, Štybar joined the UCI World Tour team Quick-Step to combine his cyclo-cross career with a career in road cycling. In his first road race with the team, Štybar finished in third place overall at May's Four Days of Dunkirk, having finished in the same position on the race's queen stage which involved several cobbled climbs. He also finished third in the Czech National Road Race Championships the following month.

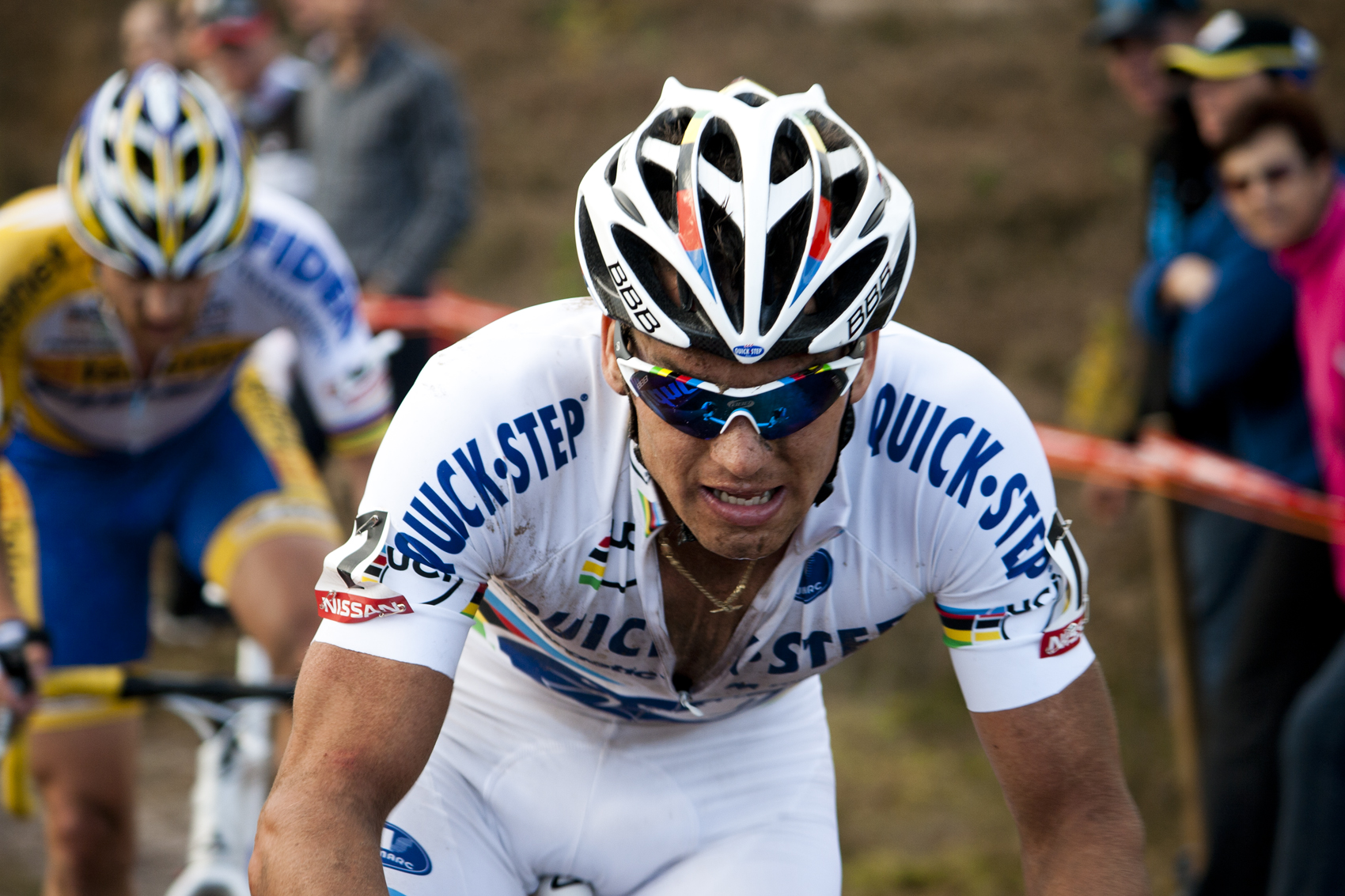
Štybar during the 2011–12 cyclo-cross season at Zonhoven

Just as in 2011, Štybar's first road start in 2012 came at the Four Days of Dunkirk; having finished second on the second stage, Štybar won the penultimate stage (also the queen stage) by ten seconds – his first professional road victory – as he finished second overall behind Jimmy Engoulvent. Having finished second to Jan Bárta at the Czech National Time Trial Championships, Štybar took his first victory at UCI World Tour level when he won the third stage of the Tour de Pologne in a sprint finish in Cieszyn. He made his Grand Tour début later in the year, at the Vuelta a España.

In 2013, Štybar came in sixth in Paris–Roubaix. He was in contention for the victory as he was part of the leading trio with Sep Vanmarcke and Fabian Cancellara when he hit a spectator, causing him to slow down to clip in his pedals. He tried to get back to the two leaders, but to no avail. In August, Štybar took the overall victory in the Eneco Tour – part of the UCI World Tour – winning two stages in the process. Later that month, Štybar won stage 7 of the Vuelta a España beating world champion Philippe Gilbert in a sprint finish in Mairena del Aljarafe.

==== 2014 ====
In 2014, Štybar won his third elite world title at the UCI Cyclo-cross World Championships in Hoogerheide, Netherlands following an intense battle with defending champion Sven Nys. He ran as high as third overall at Paris–Nice, but ultimately lost time on the final stage around Nice. Over the following few weeks, he recorded top-ten finishes at Milan–San Remo (seventh) and Paris–Roubaix (fifth). Having finished third in the Czech National Time Trial Championships, three days later, Štybar won his first Czech National Road Race Championships title, finishing almost a minute clear of his closest rivals.

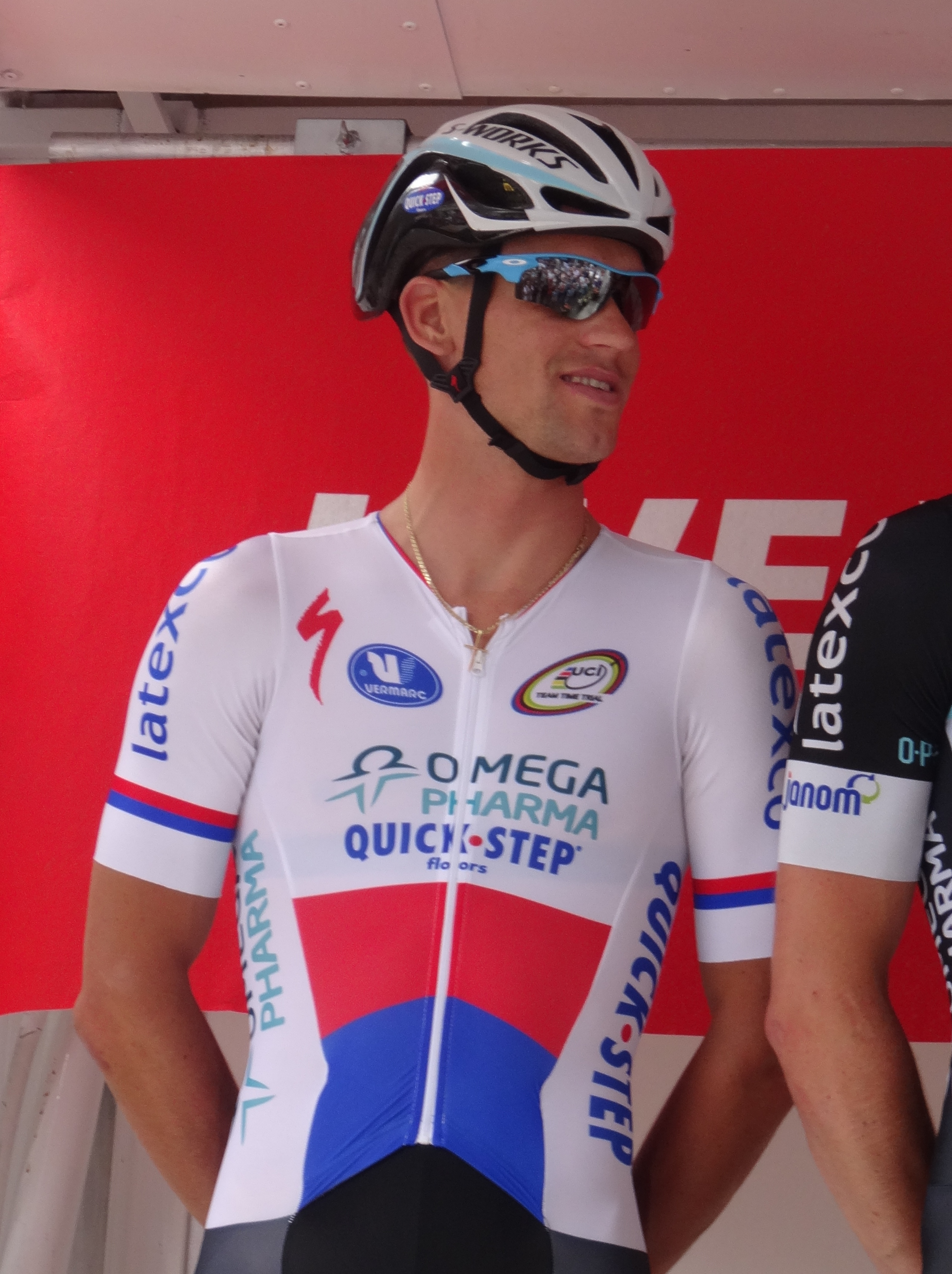
Štybar won his first Czech National Road Race Championships title in 2014; he is pictured debuting the jersey at the Tour de Wallonie

In trying to defend his title in the Eneco Tour – where he had also won the second stage – Štybar crashed into the steel barriers in the fourth stage near the finish line and was hospitalised, losing his front upper teeth as a result. Upon his return, he complained to the Union Cycliste Internationale (UCI) that the same dangerous barriers were used in the Grand Prix Cycliste de Québec. His first victory upon his return was Binche–Chimay–Binche, where he attacked inside of 2 kilometres (1.2 miles) to go on a small cobbled climb after being led out by his teammate Niki Terpstra at the foot of the rise. Štybar had time to celebrate, coming in 2 seconds ahead of John Degenkolb and the charging sprinters.

==== 2015 ====
In his first start of the 2015 season, Štybar finished in third place at the Vuelta a Murcia. Having finished seventh at Omloop Het Nieuwsblad, Štybar then won Strade Bianche on his first appearance at the race the following weekend; having been a part of a larger group of leading favourites, Štybar formed part of a trio that battled it out for victory in Siena along with Alejandro Valverde and Greg Van Avermaet, ultimately pulling clear of his rivals as they headed towards the Piazza del Campo.

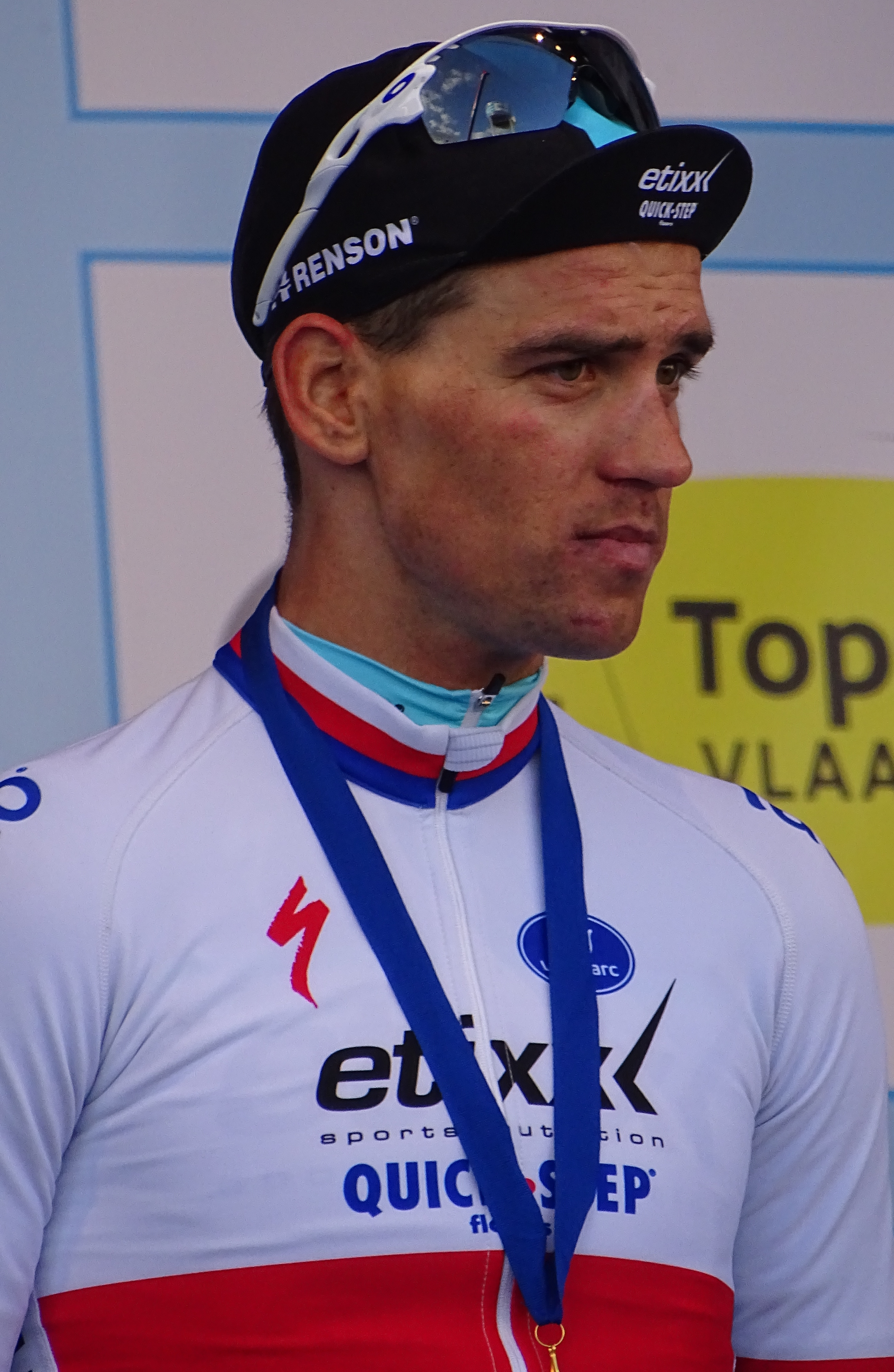
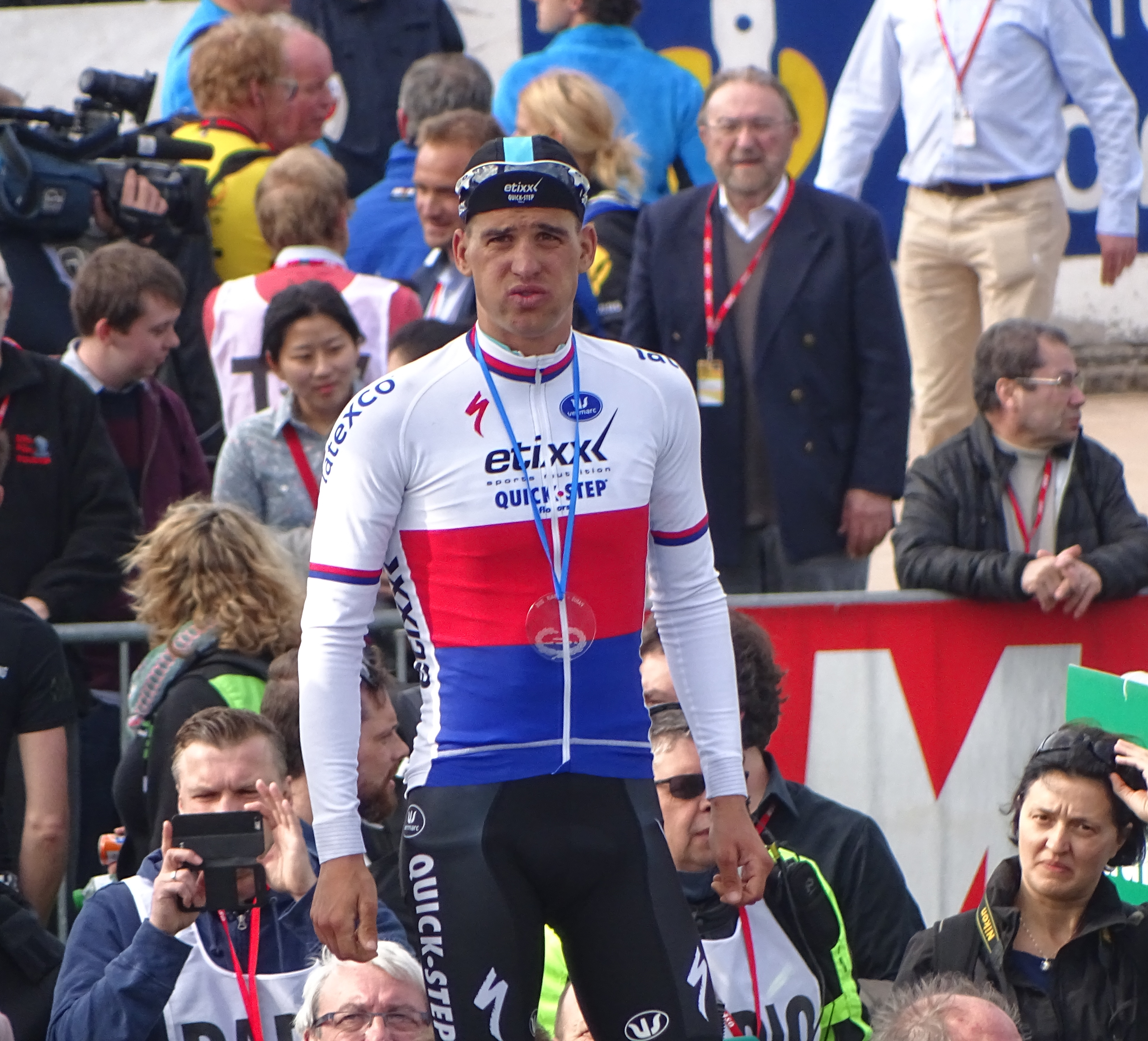
Štybar recorded two second-place finishes during the spring cobbled classics in 2015, at E3 Harelbeke (left) and Paris–Roubaix (right)

Following his Strade Bianche victory, Štybar finished second in E3 Harelbeke, having unsuccessfully tried to chase down a solo move by Geraint Thomas. At the Tour of Flanders, his false set of front teeth he broke in 2014 rattled loose as he was riding a cobbled climb and he had to take them off. He still managed to finish the race in ninth position. He then finished in second place in Paris–Roubaix, being outsprinted by John Degenkolb at Roubaix Velodrome.

Štybar was named in the start list for the Tour de France, spending a portion of the race inside the top ten places overall. He met success on Stage 6, where he powered away on a short but steep incline situated a few hundred metres before the finish line in Le Havre. He kept Peter Sagan from reaching him, crossing the line with a two-second advantage over the reduced group. He then finished third overall at the Czech Cycling Tour, winning the final stage and the points classification, and finished fifth overall at the Tour of Britain.

==== 2016–2019 ====
Štybar started his 2016 season racing at the Vuelta a Mallorca one-day races, finishing third in the Trofeo Pollença–Port de Andratx. He then finished second in Strade Bianche after being outsprinted by fellow escapee Fabian Cancellara at the finish in Siena. The following week, he won the second stage of Tirreno–Adriatico after a late solo attack, to take the race lead. He held the race lead until the penultimate day, and having entered the final stage in second overall – seven seconds behind race leader Greg Van Avermaet – he ultimately lost five places in the general classification over the final 10.05-kilometre (6.24-mile) individual time trial. He took no further victories for the remainder of the season, recording second-place finishes at both the Czech National Road Race Championships and Binche–Chimay–Binche, and took top-ten results in the Tour of Flanders (eighth) and the Eneco Tour (seventh).

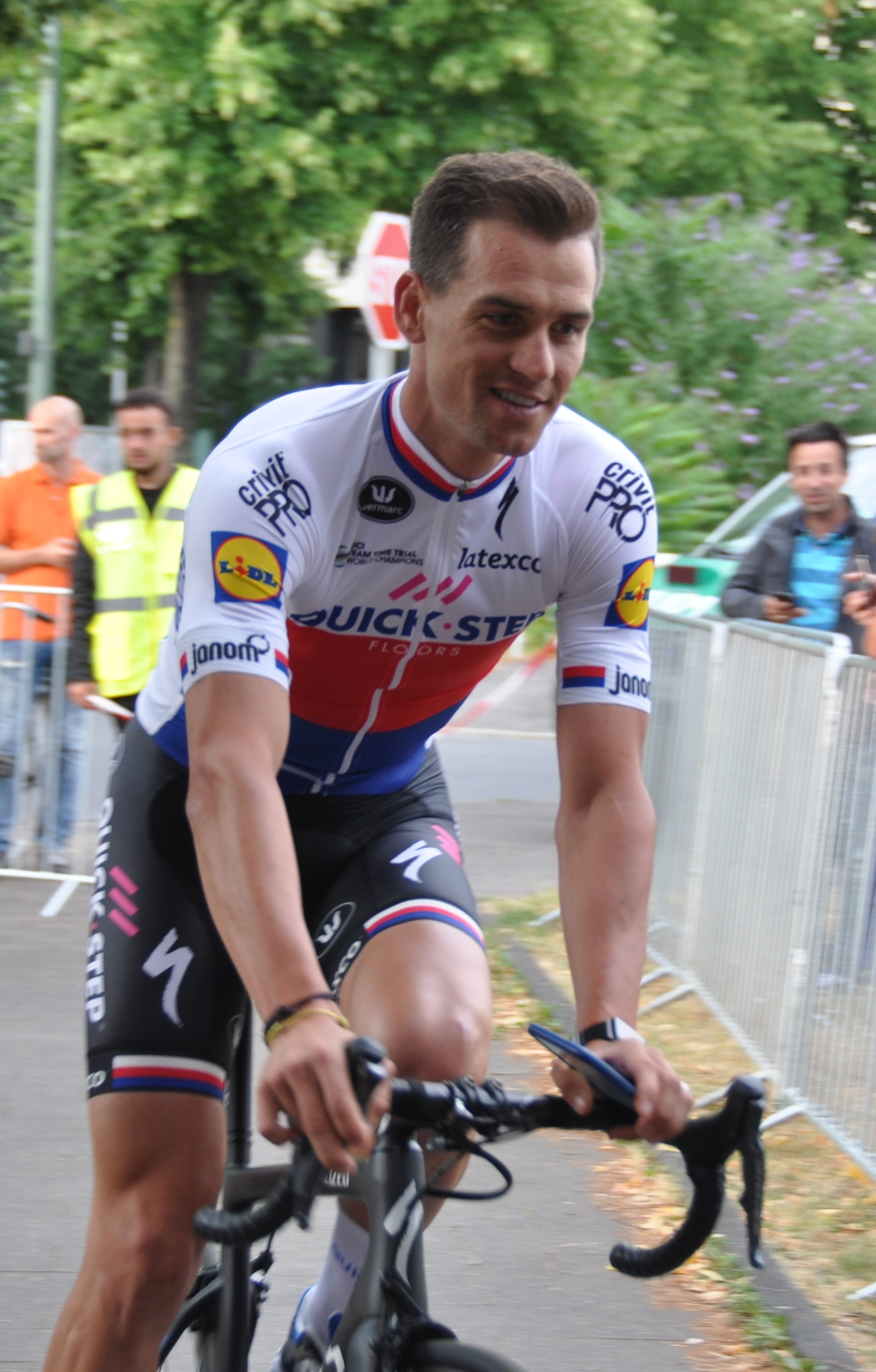
Štybar at the 2017 Tour de France

After top-ten finishes in successive starts at Kuurne–Brussels–Kuurne (ninth) and Strade Bianche (fourth) in the spring of 2017, Štybar finished second behind Greg Van Avermaet (BMC Racing Team) at Paris–Roubaix, in a five-man sprint finish in Roubaix Velodrome. He then won a second Czech National Road Race Championships title, taking, for the first time, the national champion's jersey to the Tour de France. The following year, Štybar finished in the top ten placings of eight one-day races on the 2018 UCI World Tour, with a best of result of sixth place at Dwars door Vlaanderen, the Bretagne Classic Ouest-France, and the Grand Prix Cycliste de Québec. He did, however, win the points classification at the BinckBank Tour.

Štybar's first start of the 2019 season came at the Volta ao Algarve, where he won the final stage of the race atop the Alto do Malhão, avenging his near miss from the previous year – when he was caught with 1.5 kilometres (0.93 miles) remaining. He then became the first Czech rider to win Omloop Het Nieuwsblad, soloing away from a five-rider move around 2 kilometres (1.2 miles) before the finish. Having taken a fourth-place finish at Strade Bianche, Štybar added a third win of the season at the E3 BinckBank Classic, winning a sprint of four riders in Harelbeke, following a leadout from teammate Bob Jungels. Štybar recorded his sixth top-ten finish in seven years at Paris–Roubaix with an eighth-place finish, but he recorded no further victories for the remainder of the season.

==== 2020s ====
In his first race of 2020, Štybar won the penultimate stage of the Vuelta a San Juan, starting and finishing at the Circuito San Juan Villicum motor racing circuit; he attacked inside of the final kilometre and managed to hold off the sprinters closing in behind. Following the COVID-19 pandemic-enforced suspension of racing, Štybar finished second to Adam Ťoupalík at the Czech National Road Race Championships, and finished third on stage fourteen of the Vuelta a España, having been a part of a seven-rider breakaway group.

Štybar's best results of the 2021 season came on Belgian soil; in March, he finished in fifth place at the E3 Saxo Bank Classic, spending the final portion of the race attempting to stymie any attacks from a small group of riders, behind his teammate Kasper Asgreen, who ultimately soloed to victory. In September, he finished seventh on successive weekends at the Primus Classic, and the road race at the UCI Road World Championships. In 2022, Štybar's best result was a second-place finish at the Tour of Leuven, losing to Victor Campenaerts in a sprint à deux, and he also finished in the top ten at the inaugural UCI Gravel World Championships in Italy.

=== Team Jayco–AlUla, retirement (2023–2024) ===
After twelve years within the Quick-Step organisation, Štybar joined Team BikeExchange–Jayco – later renamed as Team Jayco–AlUla – on a one-year contract for the 2023 season. Primarily working as a road captain, Štybar recorded his best result in, what would turn out to be, his final start with the team – a podium finish (third place) at the Hong Kong Cyclothon, won by teammate Lukas Pöstlberger. Having completed the road season, Štybar left the team following four starts during the 2023–24 cyclo-cross season.

Štybar then competed as a privateer in the 2024 cyclo-cross races, having previously announced that he would retire following the UCI Cyclo-cross World Championships in February, which were to be held on home soil in Tábor. He finished 3rd in the Czech National Championships, and finished in 31st at the World Championships.

== Personal life ==
Štybar is married to Belgian national Ine Vanden Bergh, and the couple have one son.

== Major results ==
=== Cyclo-cross ===
2001–2002
1st National Junior Championships
3rd UCI World Junior Championships
2002–2003
3rd UCI World Junior Championships
2004–2005
1st UCI World Under-23 Championships
1st National Under-23 Championships
3rd Overall UCI Under-23 World Cup

2nd Nommay
3rd Hofstade

Under-23 Superprestige

2nd Diegem
3rd Sint-Michielsgestel

2nd Under-23 Milan
2005–2006
1st UCI World Under-23 Championships
Under-23 Superprestige

2nd Sint-Michielsgestel
2nd Vorselaar
3rd Gavere
3rd Hoogstraten

3rd Overall Under-23 Gazet van Antwerpen

2nd Koppenberg
2nd Loenhout

2nd Hasselt
3rd UEC European Under-23 Championships
2006–2007
1st Ardooie
1st Harderwijk
1st Faè di Oderzo
UCI Under-23 World Cup

1st Treviso
2nd Hofstade

Under-23 Superprestige

1st Ruddervoorde
2nd Sint-Michielsgestel
2nd Gavere
2nd Diegem
2nd Vorselaar
2nd Hamme
2nd Diegem
2nd Hoogstraten

2nd UEC European Under-23 Championships
2nd National Championships
2nd Erpe-Mere
2nd Eernegem
3rd Antwerpen
2007–2008
1st National Championships
UCI World Cup

1st Kalmthout

Toi Toi Cup

1st Louny
1st Plzeň
1st Podbořany

1st Faè di Oderzo
2nd UCI World Championships
3rd Overall Gazet van Antwerpen

2nd Loenhout
2nd Baal
3rd Koppenberg
3rd Essen

4th Overall Superprestige

2nd Ruddervoorde
2nd Hamme
2nd Hoogstraten
3rd Diegem

2008–2009
1st National Championships
Superprestige

1st Diegem

2nd UCI World Championships
2nd Mechelen
3rd Overall Gazet van Antwerpen

1st Loenhout
2nd Essen
2nd Baal

3rd Overall UCI World Cup

2nd Tábor
2nd Roubaix
3rd Koksijde
3rd Milan

Toi Toi Cup

3rd Hlinsko

3rd Zonhoven
3rd Neerpelt
3rd Tervuren
2009–2010
1st UCI World Championships
1st National Championships
1st Overall UCI World Cup

1st Koksijde
1st Igorre
1st Roubaix
2nd Treviso
2nd Nommay
2nd Kalmthout
2nd Hoogerheide
3rd Plzeň

1st Overall Superprestige

1st Hamme
1st Vorselaar
2nd Hoogstraten
2nd Diegem
2nd Zonhoven
3rd Ruddervoorde
3rd Gavere

1st Tervuren
1st Mechelen
Toi Toi Cup

1st Stříbro
1st Podbořany

2nd Overall Gazet van Antwerpen

1st Hasselt
2nd Baal
2nd Lille
2nd Oostmalle
3rd Namur
3rd Essen
3rd Loenhout

2nd Ardooie
2nd Neerpelt
3rd Antwerp
3rd Niel
2010–2011
1st UCI World Championships
1st National Championships
1st Ardooie
1st Bredene
1st Mechelen
UCI World Cup

1st Aigle
1st Plzeň
2nd Koksijde

Toi Toi Cup

1st Stříbro
1st Louny

2nd Overall Gazet van Antwerpen

1st Namur
2nd Hasselt
3rd Loenhout

2nd Zonnebeke
2nd Eeklo
3rd Overall Superprestige

1st Ruddervoorde
1st Zonhoven
2nd Baal
2nd Lille
2nd Oostmalle
3rd Diegem

3rd Heerlen
2011–2012
1st National Championships
Toi Toi Cup

1st Stříbro

1st Baden
1st Ardooie
2nd Overall Gazet van Antwerpen

2nd Ronse
2nd Hasselt
2nd Loenhout
2nd Lille
2nd Oostmalle
3rd Koppenberg

2nd Mechelen
3rd Overall UCI World Cup

1st Liévin
2nd Tábor
2nd Heusden-Zolder
2nd Hoogerheide
3rd Plzeň

3rd Overall Superprestige

1st Hamme
1st Middelkerke
3rd Gavere

2nd Bredene
2012–2013
1st National Championships
BPost Bank Trophy

2nd Loenhout
2nd Baal

UCI World Cup

3rd Heusden-Zolder

Superprestige

3rd Diegem

3rd Bredene
2013–2014
1st UCI World Championships
1st Bredene
BPost Bank Trophy

2nd Baal

UCI World Cup

3rd Heusden-Zolder

2022–2023
1st Dohňany II
2nd Dohňany I
2023–2024
3rd National Championships

==== UCI World Cup results ====
Season	1	2	3	4	5	6	7	8	9	10	11	12	13	14	Rank	Points
2004–2005	WOR; 52	TAB —	PIJ —	KOK —	WET —	MIL —	HOF —	AIG —	NOM —	HOO —	LAN —				—N/a	
2005–2006	KAL; 23	TAB; 9	PIJ; 18	WET; 11	MIL; 28	IGO —	HOF; 18	HOG; 10	LIE; 5	HOO; 27					—N/a	
2006–2007	AIG; 9	KAL —	TAB; 6	TRE —	PIJ; 15	KOK —	IGO —	MIL —	HOF —	NOM —	HOO —				—N/a	
2007–2008	KAL; 1	TAB; 5	PIJ; 7	KOK; 15	IGO; 13	HOF; 13	LIE; 7	HOO; 47							—N/a	
2008–2009	KAL; 6	TAB; 2	PIJ; 13	KOK; 3	IGO; 6	NOM; 17	ZOL; 5	ROU; 2	MIL; 3						3rd	497
2009–2010	TRE; 2	PLZ; 3	NOM; 2	KOK; 1	IGO; 1	KAL; 2	ZOL; 6	ROU; 1	HOO; 2						1st	635
2010–2011	AIG; 1	PLZ; 1	KOK; 2	IGO —	KAL —	ZOL —	PON —	HOO; 4							11th	290
2011–2012	PLZ; 3	TAB; 2	KOK; 4	ROU; 1	NAM; 5	ZOL; 2	LIE; 1	HOO; 2							3rd	525
2012–2013	TAB —	PLZ —	KOK —	IGO —	NAM —	ZOL; 3	ROM —	HOO —							46th	65
2013–2014	VAL —	TAB —	KOK —	NAM —	ZOL; 3	ROM —	NOM —								43rd	65
2018–2019	WAT —	IOW —	BER —	TAB —	KOK —	NAM —	ZOL; 21	PON —	HOO —						66th	30
2019–2020	IOW —	WAT —	BER —	TAB —	KOK —	NAM —	ZOL; 32	NOM —	HOO —						72nd	19
2022–2023	WAT —	FAY —	TAB; 17	MAA —	BER —	OVE —	HUL —	ANT —	DUB —	VDS —	GAV —	ZON; DNF	BEN; 23	BES —	49th	12
2023–2024	WAT —	MAA —	DEN —	TRO —	DUB —	FLA —	VDS —	NAM —	ANT —	GAV —	HUL; 43	ZON —	BEN —	HOO; 27	NC	0

=== Gravel ===
2022
8th UCI World Championships

=== Road ===
2005
8th Gran Premio della Liberazione
9th Overall Giro delle Regioni
2006
1st Stage 6 Volta a Lleida
1st Stage 3 Tour des Pyrénées
2007
3rd Grand Prix Criquielion
2010
1st Prologue Okolo Slovenska
2011
3rd Road race, National Championships
3rd Overall Four Days of Dunkirk
2012 (2 pro wins)
1st Stage 3 Tour de Pologne
2nd Time trial, National Championships
2nd Overall Four Days of Dunkirk

1st Stage 4

10th Paris–Tours
2013 (4)
1st Overall Eneco Tour

1st Stages 3 & 7

1st Stage 7 Vuelta a España
1st Stage 1 (TTT) Tirreno–Adriatico
6th Paris–Roubaix
2014 (3)
National Championships

1st Road race
3rd Time trial

1st Binche–Chimay–Binche
1st Stage 2 Eneco Tour
5th Paris–Roubaix
7th Milan–San Remo
10th Clásica de San Sebastián
2015 (3)
1st Strade Bianche
1st Stage 6 Tour de France
2nd E3 Harelbeke
2nd Paris–Roubaix
3rd Overall Czech Cycling Tour

1st Points classification
1st Stages 1 (TTT) & 4

3rd Vuelta a Murcia
5th Overall Tour of Britain
7th Omloop Het Nieuwsblad
9th Tour of Flanders
2016 (1)
2nd Road race, National Championships
2nd Strade Bianche
2nd Binche–Chimay–Binche
3rd Trofeo Pollença–Port de Andratx
7th Overall Tirreno–Adriatico

1st Stage 2

7th Overall Eneco Tour
8th Tour of Flanders
8th Gran Piemonte
2017 (1)
1st Road race, National Championships
2nd Paris–Roubaix
4th Strade Bianche
9th Kuurne–Brussels–Kuurne
2018
1st Points classification, BinckBank Tour
6th Bretagne Classic Ouest-France
6th Grand Prix Cycliste de Québec
6th Dwars door Vlaanderen
7th Strade Bianche
8th Gent–Wevelgem
9th Paris–Roubaix
9th E3 Harelbeke
10th Tour of Flanders
2019 (3)
1st E3 BinckBank Classic
1st Omloop Het Nieuwsblad
4th Strade Bianche
6th Overall Volta ao Algarve

1st Stage 5

8th Paris–Roubaix
2020 (1)
1st Stage 6 Vuelta a San Juan
2nd Road race, National Championships
6th Strade Bianche
2021
5th E3 Saxo Bank Classic
7th Road race, UCI World Championships
7th Primus Classic
2022
2nd Tour of Leuven

==== Grand Tour general classification results timeline ====
Grand Tour	2012	2013	2014	2015	2016	2017	2018	2019	2020	2021
Giro d'Italia	—	—	—	—	—	—	80	—	—	—
Tour de France	—	—	—	103	—	102	—	—	—	—
Vuelta a España	76	DNF	—	—	63	—	—	55	102	133

==== Classics results timeline ====
Monument	2012	2013	2014	2015	2016	2017	2018	2019	2020	2021	2022	2023
Milan–San Remo	—	66	7	56	142	—	—	67	19	37	68	52
Tour of Flanders	—	36	18	9	8	67	10	36	73	—	54	75
Paris–Roubaix	—	6	5	2	110	2	9	8	NH	26	45	79
Liège–Bastogne–Liège	—	—	—	42	—	—	—	—	—	—	—	—
Giro di Lombardia	—	—	—	DNF	DNF	—	—	—	—	—	—	—
Classic	2012	2013	2014	2015	2016	2017	2018	2019	2020	2021	2022	2023
Omloop Het Nieuwsblad	—	92	29	7	—	14	20	1	36	125	62	DNF
Strade Bianche	—	—	—	1	2	4	7	4	6	62	—	73
E3 Harelbeke	—	40	19	2	15	53	9	1	NH	5	54	86
Gent–Wevelgem	—	57	20	38	46	52	8	35	41	25	—	84
Dwars door Vlaanderen	—	—	—	—	—	21	6	—	NH	—	61	DNF
Clásica de San Sebastián	45	—	10	38	28	26	—	—	NH	DNF	—	—
Paris–Tours	10	—	—	—	71	71	—	—	—	—	—	—

Legend
—	Did not compete
DNF	Did not finish
NH	Not held

== Decorations ==
Awarded by Czech Republic

- Medal of Merit (2024)
