= 2009–10 UCI Cyclo-cross World Cup =

Bicycle racing competition

The 2009–2010 UCI Cyclo-cross World Cup events and season-long competition took place between 4 October 2009 and 24 January 2010, and was sponsored by the Union Cycliste Internationale (UCI).

== Events ==
Date	Venue	Elite men's winner	Elite women's winner
4 October	(Italy) Treviso	Niels Albert (BEL)	Katie Compton (USA)
18 October	(Czech Republic) Plzeň	Niels Albert (BEL)	No UCI World Cup race
8 November	(France) Nommay	Niels Albert (BEL)	Katie Compton (USA)
28 November	(Belgium) Koksijde	Zdeněk Štybar (CZE)	Marianne Vos (NED)
6 December	(Spain) Igorre	Zdeněk Štybar (CZE)	No UCI World Cup race
20 December	(Belgium) Kalmthout	Sven Nys (BEL)	Daphny van den Brand (NED)
26 December	(Belgium) Heusden-Zolder	Kevin Pauwels (BEL)	Marianne Vos (NED)
17 January	(France) Roubaix	Zdeněk Štybar (CZE)	Kateřina Nash (CZE)
24 January	(Netherlands) Hoogerheide	Niels Albert (BEL)	Marianne Vos (NED)

== See also ==
- 2009–2010 Cyclo-cross Superprestige
- 2009–2010 Cyclo-cross Gazet van Antwerpen
