= Steenbergcross =

Race details
- Region: Erpe-Mere, Belgium
- Local name(s): Steenbergcross (in Dutch)
- Discipline: Cyclo-cross
- Organiser: KWC Erpe Sportief
- Web site: www.steenbergcross.com

History
- First edition: 2002
- Editions: 14 (as of 2015)
- First winner: Sven Nys (BEL)
- Most wins: Sven Nys (BEL), Niels Albert (BEL) (5 wins)
- Most recent: Wout Van Aert (BEL)

The Steenbergcross (Dutch for stone mountain cross) is a cyclo-cross race held in Erpe-Mere, Belgium with the first edition in 2002. The cross is not part of any season-long competitions.

== Podiums ==
=== Men ===
Year	Winner	Second	Third
2015	Wout Van Aert (BEL)	Michael Vanthourenhout (BEL)	Sven Nys (BEL)
2014	Klaas Vantornout (BEL)	Sven Nys (BEL)	Philipp Walsleben (GER)
2013	Niels Albert (BEL)	Klaas Vantornout (BEL)	Tom Meeusen (BEL)
2012	Niels Albert (BEL)	Kevin Pauwels (BEL)	Klaas Vantornout (BEL)
2011	Kevin Pauwels (BEL)	Sven Nys (BEL)	Klaas Vantornout (BEL)
2010	Sven Nys (BEL)	Bart Aernouts (BEL)	Kevin Pauwels (BEL)
2009	Niels Albert (BEL)	Kevin Pauwels (BEL)	Dieter Vanthourenhout (BEL)
2008	Niels Albert (BEL)	Klaas Vantornout (BEL)	Sven Vanthourenhout (BEL)
2007	Niels Albert (BEL)	Klaas Vantornout (BEL)	Erwin Vervecken (BEL)
2006	Sven Nys (BEL)	Erwin Vervecken (BEL)	Zdeněk Štybar (CZE)
2005	Bart Wellens (BEL)	Sven Nys (BEL)	Sven Vanthourenhout (BEL)
2004	Sven Nys (BEL)	Ben Berden (BEL)	Wim Jacobs (BEL)
2003	Sven Nys (BEL)	Ben Berden (BEL)	Wim Jacobs (BEL)
2002	Sven Nys (BEL)	Bjorn Rondelez (BEL)	Tom Vannoppen (BEL)
