= Flanders Indoor Cyclo-cross =

The Flanders Indoor Cyclo-cross is a cyclo-cross race held in the Nekkerhal in Mechelen, Belgium. It is the first ever indoor cyclo-cross race, which was held for the first time on 17 January 2007.

== Past winners ==
Year	Winner	Second	Third
2016	Sven Nys (BEL)	Wout Van Aert (BEL)	Lars van der Haar (NED)
2015	Mathieu van der Poel (NED)	Wout Van Aert (BEL)	Kevin Pauwels (BEL)
2014	Sven Nys (BEL)	Lars van der Haar (NED)	Niels Albert (BEL)
2013	Sven Nys (BEL)	Niels Albert (BEL)	Klaas Vantornout (BEL)
2012	Niels Albert (BEL)	Zdeněk Štybar (CZE)	Sven Nys (BEL)
2011	Zdeněk Štybar (CZE)	Sven Nys (BEL)	Niels Albert (BEL)
2010	Zdeněk Štybar (CZE)	Niels Albert (BEL)	Sven Nys (BEL)
2009	Niels Albert (BEL)	Zdeněk Štybar (CZE)	Bart Wellens (BEL)
2008	Lars Boom (NED)	Niels Albert (BEL)	Sven Nys (BEL)
2007	Sven Nys (BEL)	Niels Albert (BEL)	Sven Vanthourenhout (BEL)
