= 2016 Strade Bianche =

2016 UCI Europe Tour

Race details
- Dates: 5 March 2016
- Stages: 1
- Distance: 176 km (109.4 mi)
- Winning time: 4h 39' 35"

Results
	Winner	Fabian Cancellara (SWI)	(Trek–Segafredo)
	Second	Zdeněk Štybar (CZE)	(Etixx–Quick-Step)
	Third	Gianluca Brambilla (ITA)	(Etixx–Quick-Step)

The tenth edition of the Strade Bianche road cycling race was held on 5 March 2016, in Tuscany, Italy. Swiss Fabian Cancellara concluded his third win in the race. The race covered 176 km (109 mi), starting and finishing in Siena. It was part of the 2016 UCI Europe Tour, a 1.HC-ranked event.

== Route ==
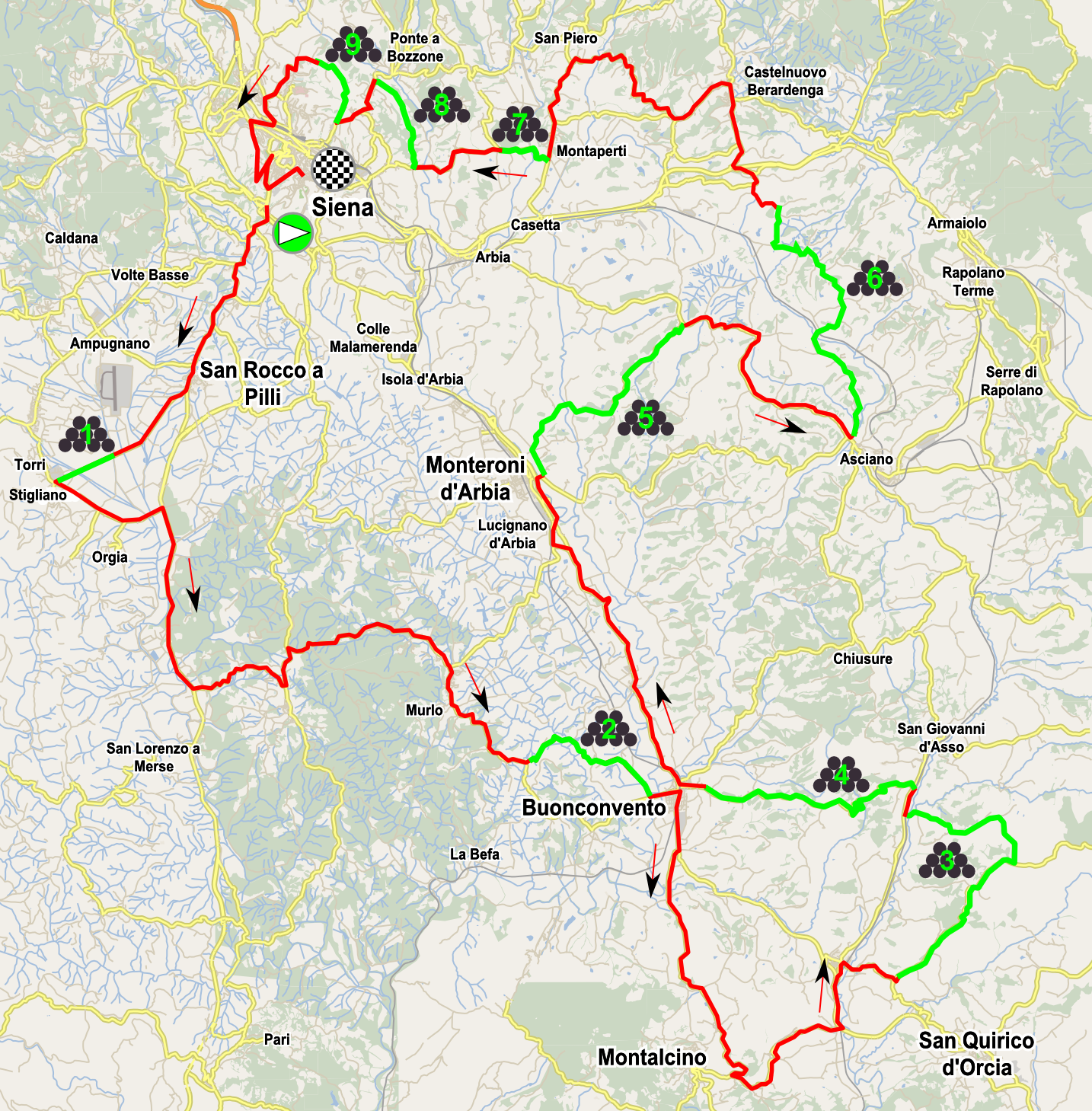
2016 route: 176 km with nine sectors of strade bianche.

The race started and finished in the UNESCO World Heritage Site of Siena, marking a shift from previous editions, which started in San Gimignano. Because of its new start location, the distance is scaled back to 176 kilometres, run entirely within the southern Tuscan province of Siena. The Strade Bianche is particularly renowned for its sectors of white gravel roads (strade bianche or sterrati), which comprise large sections of the route.

The course ran over the hilly terrain of the Chianti region and included nine sectors and a total of 52.8 km (32.8 mi) of dirt road. The first sector was addressed just 11 km after the start; the longest and most arduous sectors were the ones in Lucignano d’Asso (11.9 km) and Monte Sante Marie (11.5 km). The last stretch of gravel road came at 12 km (7 mi) from the finish in Siena. The race finished on Siena's illustrious Piazza del Campo, after a narrow ascent on the roughly-paved Via Santa Caterina in the heart of the medieval city, with steep stretches of up to 16 % gradient.

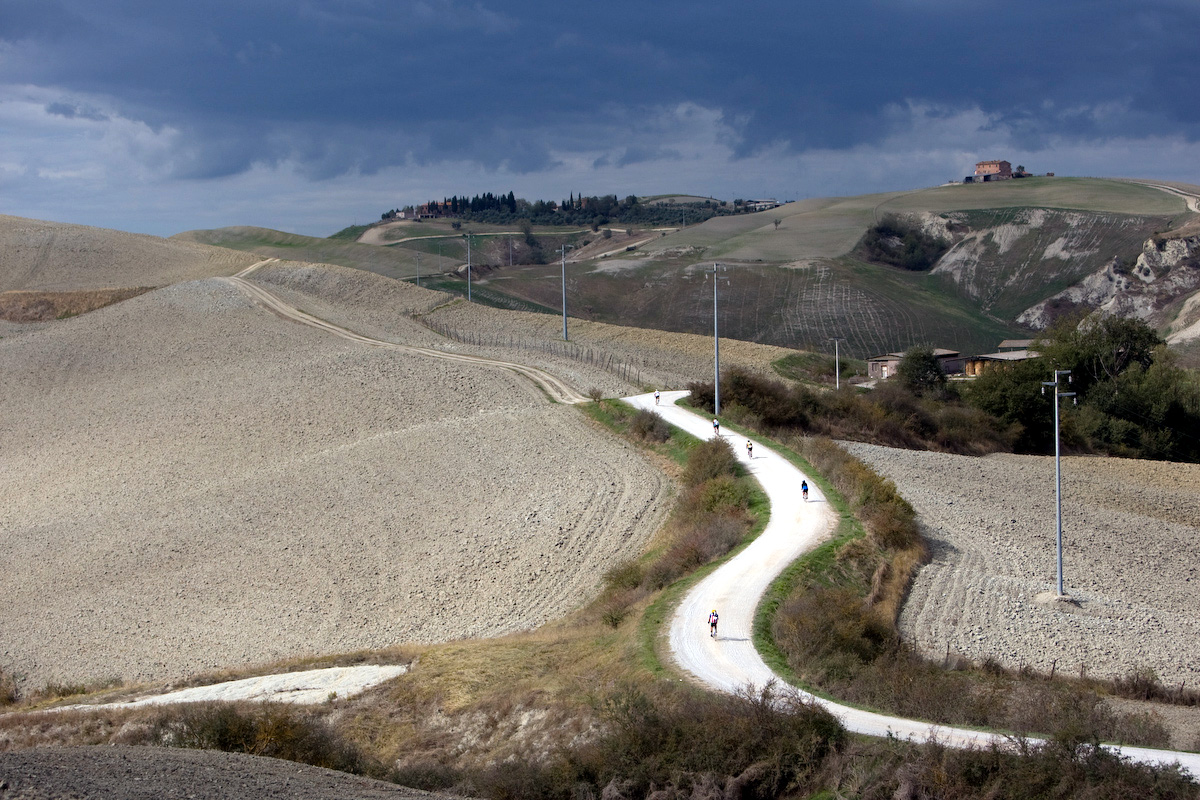
One of the strade bianche, pictured during the "Eroica" granfondo.

Sectors of strade bianche
Sector	Name	Kilometre marker	Length (km)	Category
1	Vidritta	11.1 to 13.1	2.1	*
2	Comune di Murlo	39.8 to 45.8	5.5	*
3	Lucignano d'Asso	67.8 to 79.7	11.9	*
4	Radi Bianche	80.6 to 90.2	8	[...]
5	San Martino in Grania	103.6 to 113	9.5	[...]
6	Monte Sante Marie	122 to 133.4	11.5	*
7	Monteaperti	151.7 to 152.5	0.8	*
8	Colle Pinzuto	156.6 to 159	2.4	*
9	Le Tolfe	162.7 to 164	1.1	*

== Pre-race favourites ==
Previous year's laureate, Czech Zdeněk Štybar, lined up for the 2016 event. World champion Peter Sagan, runner-up in 2013 and 2014, and twofold winner Fabian Cancellara expressed they targeted a victory in the Strade Bianche. Other riders among the favorites were Vincenzo Nibali, Alejandro Valverde, Michał Kwiatkowski and Greg Van Avermaet.

== Participating teams ==
18 teams took part in the race: twelve UCI WorldTeams and six UCI Professional Continental teams – totaling 144 riders. Each team had a maximum of eight riders:

UCI WorldTeams

- AG2R La Mondiale
- Etixx–Quick-Step
- Lotto–Soudal
- Team Sky
- Astana
- Lampre–Merida
- Movistar Team
- Tinkoff
- BMC Racing Team
- LottoNL–Jumbo
- Trek–Segafredo
- Orica–GreenEDGE

UCI Professional Continental teams

- Androni Giocattoli–Sidermec
- Nippo–Vini Fantini
- Bardiani–CSF
- Team Novo Nordisk
- CCC–Sprandi–Polkowice
- Southeast–Venezuela

== Results ==
Race result
Rank	Rider	Team	Time
1	Fabian Cancellara (SUI)	Trek–Segafredo	4h 39' 35"
2	Zdeněk Štybar (CZE)	Etixx–Quick-Step	s.t.
3	Gianluca Brambilla (ITA)	Etixx–Quick-Step	+ 4"
4	Peter Sagan (SVK)	Tinkoff	+ 13"
5	Petr Vakoč (CZE)	Etixx–Quick-Step	+ 34"
6	Greg Van Avermaet (BEL)	BMC Racing Team	+ 37"
7	Diego Ulissi (ITA)	Lampre–Merida	+ 41"
8	Tiesj Benoot (BEL)	Lotto–Soudal	s.t.
9	Lars Petter Nordhaug (NOR)	Team Sky	s.t.
10	Alejandro Valverde (ESP)	Movistar Team	+ 50"

== See also ==
- 2016 in men's road cycling
