= 2009 UCI Cyclo-cross World Championships =

Cyclo-cross championship

- Venue: Hoogerheide, Netherlands
- Date: 31 January 2009 – 1 February 2010
- Coordinates: 51°25′3″N 4°19′26″E
- Events: 4

The 2009 UCI Cyclo-cross World Championships took place in Hoogerheide, Netherlands on the weekend of January 31 and February 1, 2009. As in 2008, four events were scheduled.

== Medal table ==
Rank	Nation	Gold	Silver	Bronze	Total
1	Netherlands (NED)	2	1	0	3
2	Germany (GER)	1	2	0	3
3	Belgium (BEL)	1	0	1	2
4	Czech Republic (CZE)	0	1	0	1
5	France (FRA)	0	0	1	1
5	Poland (POL)	0	0	1	1
5	United States (USA)	0	0	1	1
Totals (7 entries)		4	4	4	12

== Medal summary ==
Event	Gold		Silver		Bronze	
Men's events
Men's elite race	Niels Albert; Belgium	1h 02'24"	Zdeněk Štybar; Czech Republic	+ 22"	Sven Nys; Belgium	+ 38"
Men's under-23 race	Philipp Walsleben; Germany	52'45"	Christoph Pfingsten; Germany	+ 20"	Pawel Szczepaniak; Poland	s.t.
Men's junior race	Tijmen Eising; Netherlands	40'06"	Corné van Kessel; Netherlands	+ 25"	Alexandre Billon; France	s.t.
Women's events
Women's elite race	Marianne Vos; Netherlands	42'39"	Hanka Kupfernagel; Germany	+ 1"	Katie Compton; United States	+ 2"
