= 2015 Strade Bianche =

2015 UCI Europe Tour

Race details
- Dates: 7 March 2015
- Distance: 200 km (124.3 mi)
- Winning time: 5h 22' 13"

Results
	Winner	Zdeněk Štybar (CZE)	(Etixx–Quick-Step)
	Second	Greg Van Avermaet (BEL)	(BMC Racing Team)
	Third	Alejandro Valverde (ESP)	(Movistar Team)

The 2015 Strade Bianche was the ninth edition of the Strade Bianche road cycling race. Held on 7 March 2015, it started in San Gimignano and ended 200 kilometres (124 miles) away in Siena. It was a 1.HC-ranked race that was part of the 2015 UCI Europe Tour.

Particularly known for its long sections of dirt roads, the race's name comes from the strade bianche (English: white roads) that formed large sections of the route. The race was also hilly throughout, with the finish coming after a particularly difficult climb into Siena.

Traditionally the Strade Bianche was the first of a pair of races alongside the Roma Maxima; the latter event, however, was cancelled in 2015 due to "organisational problems".

The race was won by Zdeněk Štybar, with Greg Van Avermaet finishing second and Alejandro Valverde finishing third.

== Route ==
The Strade Bianche was part of the spring classics season, which began the week before with the Belgian races Omloop Het Nieuwsblad and Kuurne–Brussels–Kuurne. Many of the same riders then travelled to Tuscany to take part in the Strade Bianche.

The race was unique in the cycling season. Many of the early season races included the cobbles of Flanders and northern France; the Strade Bianche, however, included various extended sections of strade bianche, the dirt roads that gave the race its name. These were often farm tracks and included both climbs and descents, as well as various additional challenges such as uneven surfaces, steep grades, and potholes; the longest such section covered a distance of 11.5 kilometres (7.1 miles). There were ten sections of strade bianche, with the last coming 12 kilometres (7 miles) from the finish in Siena. The race was often decided, however, on the final climb. This came in the final part of the race: a 1-kilometre (0.6-mile) climb into Siena, followed by a descent into the finish in the Piazza del Campo.

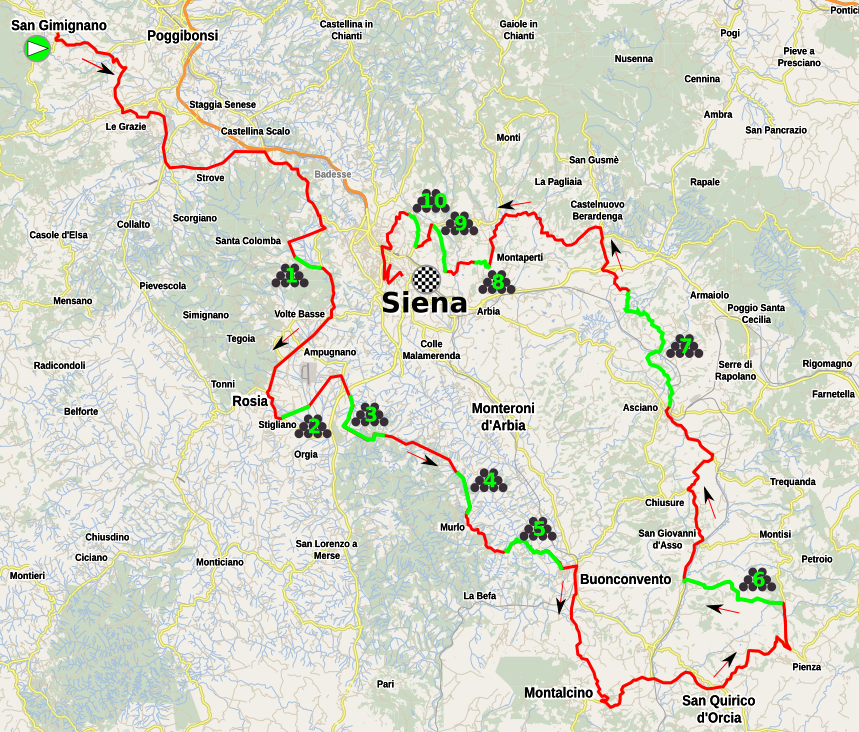
The route of the 2015 Strade Bianche included ten stretches of gravel roads.

Sectors of strade bianche
Sector	Name	Kilometre marker	Length (km)	Category
1	San Leonardo	32.6 to 34.9	2.2	*
2	Vidritta	48.5 to 50.6	2.1	*
3	Bagnaia	55.6 to 61.6	5.9	*
4	Radi	67.8 to 72.2	4.4	*
5	Str. Com. di Murlo	78.3 to 84	5.5	*
6	Lucignano d'Asso	120.5 to 129.7	9.5	*
7	Monte Sante Marie	147 to 158.5	11.5	*
8	Monteaperti	167 to 167.8	0.8	*
9	Colle Pinzuto	177.7 to 181.4	2.4	*
10	Le Tolfe	183.8 to 184.9	1.1	*

== Pre-race favourites ==
The previous year's champion, Michał Kwiatkowski (Etixx–Quick-Step), was not selected for the 2015 race; he participated in Paris–Nice, which started the following day. The runner up from 2014, Peter Sagan (Tinkoff–Saxo) was one of the favourites for the event. Another was Fabian Cancellara (Trek Factory Racing), who had won the race in 2008 and 2012.

Other riders with a chance at winning the race included Vincenzo Nibali (Astana), Rigoberto Urán, Zdeněk Štybar (both Etixx–Quick-Step), Simon Gerrans (Orica–GreenEDGE), Alejandro Valverde (Movistar Team), Greg Van Avermaet (BMC Racing Team) and Ian Stannard (Team Sky).

== Teams ==
20 teams were selected to take part in the race. 14 of them were UCI WorldTeams and the remaining six were UCI Professional Continental teams.

WorldTeams

- IAM Cycling
- Astana
- Team Katusha
- Lampre–Merida
- Etixx–Quick-Step
- Team Sky
- Orica–GreenEDGE
- LottoNL–Jumbo
- Tinkoff–Saxo
- Movistar Team
- AG2R La Mondiale
- Cannondale–Garmin
- BMC Racing Team
- Trek Factory Racing

Professional Continental teams

- Team Novo Nordisk
- Bardiani–CSF
- Southeast Pro Cycling
- Nippo–Vini Fantini
- RusVelo
- Androni Giocattoli

== Report ==
An early breakaway was formed by Stefano Pirazzi (Bardiani–CSF), Giacomo Berlato and Daniele Colli (both Nippo–Vini Fantini), Giuseppe Fonzi (Southeast Pro Cycling), Artem Ovechkin (RusVelo), David Lozano (Team Novo Nordisk), Julián Arredondo (Trek Factory Racing) and Ilia Koshevoy (Lampre–Merida). This move was ended by attacks from the peloton behind on the Monte Sante Marie, which led to the formation of a new group of riders, including favourites for the race win Fabian Cancellara, Zdeněk Štybar, Alejandro Valverde, Greg Van Avermaet and Peter Sagan. This group earned a large lead, and attacks in the remaining kilometres reduced the race to three main groups. The first of these included Valverde, Van Avermaet and Stybar. Sep Vanmarcke (LottoNL–Jumbo) was chasing alone behind them, with another group of Cancellara, Diego Rosa (Astana) and Daniel Oss (BMC Racing Team) behind.

Coming into the final climb, Valverde was the favourite from the leading group, as he was seen as the best climber of the three, and the final climb into Siena was difficult. Valverde, however, had put significant effort into keeping the leading group clear of the chasers, and he was unable to respond to an attack from Van Avermaet at the bottom of the climb. Stybar held Van Avermaet's wheel and was able to pass him as the riders entered the Piazza del Campo to take the race win. Van Avermaet was second and Valverde third, with Vanmarcke holding on alone for fourth place.

== Race results ==
Race result
Rank	Rider	Team	Time
1	Zdeněk Štybar (CZE)	Etixx–Quick-Step	5h 22' 13"
2	Greg Van Avermaet (BEL)	BMC Racing Team	+ 2"
3	Alejandro Valverde (ESP)	Movistar Team	+ 18"
4	Sep Vanmarcke (BEL)	LottoNL–Jumbo	+ 46"
5	Diego Rosa (ITA)	Astana	+ 56"
6	Oscar Gatto (ITA)	Androni Giocattoli	+ 59"
7	Rigoberto Urán (COL)	Etixx–Quick-Step	+ 59"
8	Fabio Felline (ITA)	Trek Factory Racing	+ 1' 02"
9	Przemysław Niemiec (POL)	Lampre–Merida	+ 1' 03"
10	Giampaolo Caruso (ITA)	Team Katusha	+ 1' 03"

== See also ==
- 2015 in men's road cycling
