= Allen Krughoff =

American cyclo-cross cyclist

Personal information
- Born: February 19, 1984 (age 42)

Cycling career
- Sport: Cycling
- Discipline: Cyclo-cross
- Role: Rider

Allen Krughoff (born February 19, 1984) is an American male cyclo-cross cyclist. He represented his nation in the men's elite event at the 2016 UCI Cyclo-cross World Championships in Heusden-Zolder.
