= Boldbaataryn Bold-Erdene =

Mongolian cyclist (born 1983)

Personal information
- Born: June 24, 1983 (age 43)

Cycling career
- Sport: Cycling
- Discipline: Road
- Role: Rider

Boldbaataryn Bold-Erdene (born June 24, 1983) is a Mongolian cyclist.

== Palmares ==
2005
2nd National Road Championship
2nd National Time Trial Championship
National Cross Country Champion
2006
2nd National Time Trial Championship
3rd National Road Championship
2008
2nd National Road Championship
3rd National Time Trial Championship
2009
National Road Champion
National Time Trial Champion
1st stage 2 Tour of Mongolia
