= Grand Prix Lago le Bandie =

The Grand Prix Lago le Bandie is a cyclo-cross race held in Treviso, Italy, which is part of the UCI Cyclo-cross World Cup.

== Past winners ==
Year	Men's winner	Women's winner
2006	Francis Mourey (FRA)	Marianne Vos (NED)
2009	Niels Albert (BEL)	Katie Compton (USA)
