= 2019 Paris–Roubaix =

Cycling race

2019 UCI World Tour, race 16 of 38
- Event poster with previous winner Peter Sagan

Race details
- Dates: 14 April 2019
- Stages: 1
- Distance: 257 km (159.7 mi)
- Winning time: 5h 58' 02"

Results
	Winner	Philippe Gilbert (BEL)	(Deceuninck–Quick-Step)
	Second	Nils Politt (GER)	(Team Katusha–Alpecin)
	Third	Yves Lampaert (BEL)	(Deceuninck–Quick-Step)

The 2019 Paris–Roubaix was a road cycling one-day race that took place on 14 April 2019 in France. It was the 117th edition of Paris–Roubaix and the 16th event of the 2019 UCI World Tour. It was won by Philippe Gilbert in a sprint ahead of Nils Politt, with Yves Lampaert finishing in third place.

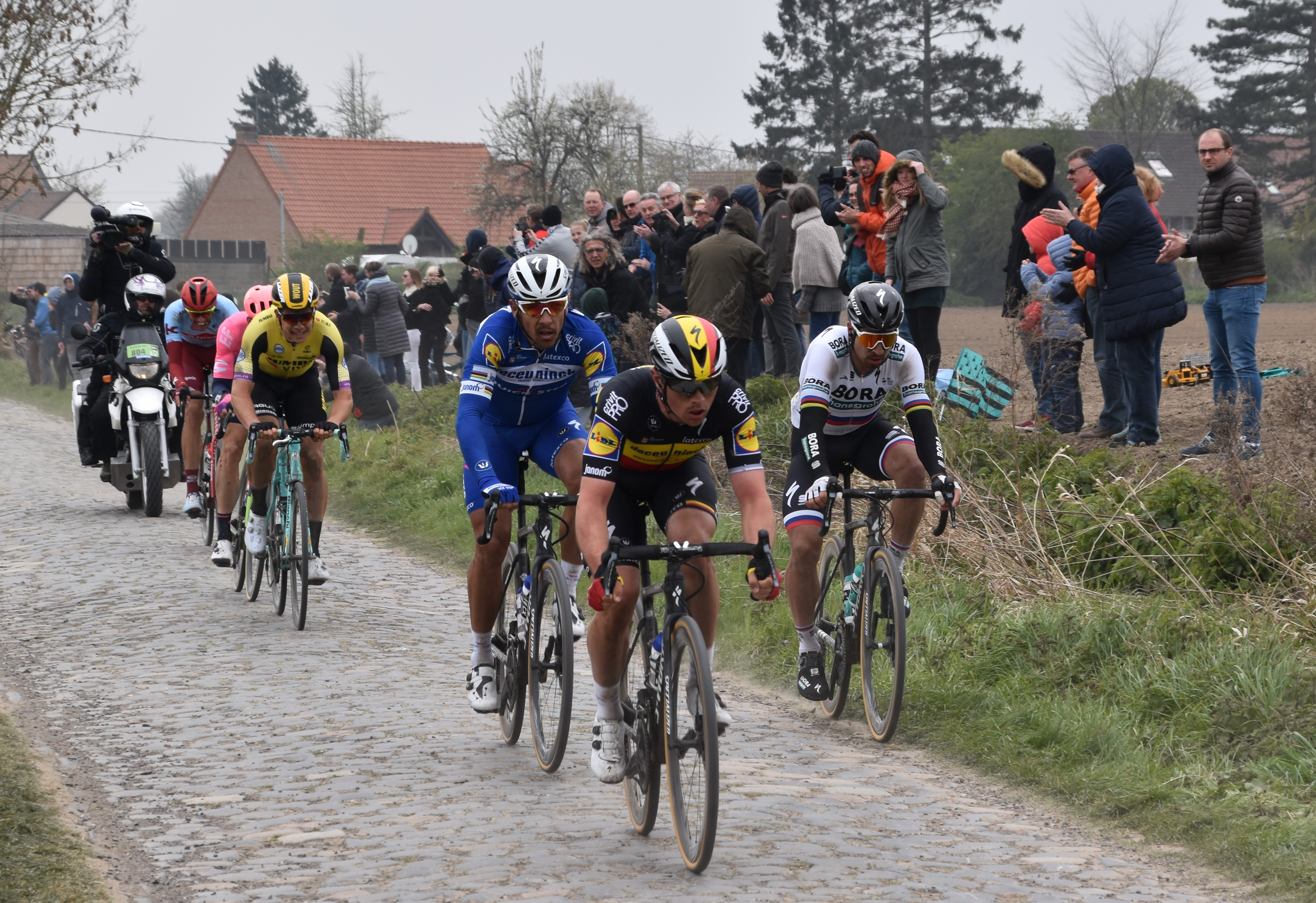
Lampaert leading Gilbert, Sagan with van Aert, Vanmarcke and Politt closely following at the Mons-en-Pévèle pavé sector

== Teams ==
As Paris–Roubaix was a UCI World Tour event, all eighteen UCI WorldTeams were invited automatically and obliged to enter a team in the race. Seven UCI Professional Continental teams competed, completing the 25-team peloton.

UCI WorldTeams

- AG2R La Mondiale
- Astana
- Bahrain–Merida
- Bora–Hansgrohe
- CCC Team
- Deceuninck–Quick-Step
- EF Education First
- Groupama–FDJ
- Team Katusha–Alpecin
- Lotto–Soudal
- Mitchelton–Scott
- Movistar Team
- Team Dimension Data
- Team Jumbo–Visma
- Team Sunweb
- Trek–Segafredo
- UAE Team Emirates
- Team Sky

UCI Professional Continental teams

- Arkéa–Samsic
- Cofidis
- Delko–Marseille Provence
- Roompot–Charles
- Vital Concept–B&B Hotels
- Wanty–Gobert
- Direct Énergie

== Result ==
Result
Rank	Rider	Team	Time
1	Philippe Gilbert (BEL)	Deceuninck–Quick-Step	5h 58' 02"
2	Nils Politt (GER)	Team Katusha–Alpecin	+ 0"
3	Yves Lampaert (BEL)	Deceuninck–Quick-Step	+ 13"
4	Sep Vanmarcke (BEL)	EF Education First	+ 40"
5	Peter Sagan (SVK)	Bora–Hansgrohe	+ 42"
6	Florian Sénéchal (FRA)	Deceuninck–Quick-Step	+ 47"
7	Mike Teunissen (NED)	Team Jumbo–Visma	+ 47"
8	Zdeněk Štybar (CZE)	Deceuninck–Quick-Step	+ 47"
9	Evaldas Šiškevičius (LTU)	Delko–Marseille Provence	+ 47"
10	Sebastian Langeveld (NED)	EF Education First	+ 47"
