= 2008 UCI Cyclo-cross World Championships =

Cyclo-cross championship

- Venue: Treviso, Italy
- Date: 26–27 January 2008
- Coordinates: 45°40′N 12°15′E
- Events: 4

The 2008 UCI Cyclo-cross World Championships took place in Treviso, Italy on the weekend of January 26 and January 27, 2008. As 2007, four events were scheduled.

== Medal table ==
Rank	Nation	Gold	Silver	Bronze	Total
1	France (FRA)	1	1	1	3
2	Netherlands (NED)	1	1	0	2
3	Belgium (BEL)	1	0	1	2
4	Germany (GER)	1	0	0	1
5	Czech Republic (CZE)	0	1	1	2
6	Slovakia (SVK)	0	1	0	1
7	Italy (ITA)	0	0	1	1
Totals (7 entries)		4	4	4	12

== Medal summary ==
Event	Gold		Silver		Bronze	
Men's events
Men's elite race	Lars Boom; Netherlands	1h 05'27"	Zdeněk Štybar; Czech Republic	+ 5"	Sven Nys; Belgium	+ 6"
Men's under-23 race	Niels Albert; Belgium	51'12"	Aurélien Duval; France	+ 37"	Claudio Cominelli; Italy	+ 45"
Men's junior race	Arnaud Jouffroy; France	40'30"	Peter Sagan; Slovakia	+ 1"	Lubomir Petrus; Czech Republic	+ 4"
Women's events
Women's elite race	Hanka Kupfernagel; Germany	45'15"	Marianne Vos; Netherlands	+ 13"	Laurence Leboucher; France	+ 17"
