= Veldrit Pijnacker =

Dutch cyclo-cross race (1999 - 2008)

The Veldrit Pijnacker was a cyclo-cross race held in Pijnacker, Netherlands and was a part of the UCI Cyclo-cross World Cup from the 2003–2004 season until the 2008–2009 season. After being thrown out of the World Cup, according to the UCI for economical reasons, the organisers decided to stop holding the race.

== Past winners ==
Year	Men's winner	Women's winner
2008	(Netherlands) Lars Boom	(Germany) Hanka Kupfernagel
2007	(Netherlands) Lars Boom	(United States) Katie Compton
2006	(Belgium) Sven Nys	(Germany) Hanka Kupfernagel
2005	(Belgium) Sven Nys	(Netherlands) Daphny van den Brand
Nov 2004	(Belgium) Sven Nys	(Netherlands) Daphny van den Brand
Feb 2004	(Netherlands) Richard Groenendaal	(Netherlands) Marianne Vos
2003	(Netherlands) Richard Groenendaal	(Netherlands) Daphny van den Brand
2002	(Netherlands) Richard Groenendaal	(Netherlands) Daphny van den Brand
2000	(Netherlands) Richard Groenendaal	not held
1999	(Netherlands) Adrie van der Poel	not held
