= Marek Cichosz =

Polish cyclist

Personal information
- Full name: Marek Cichosz
- Born: June 9, 1979 Poland
- Died: May 13, 2012 (aged 32) Borzytuchom, Poland

Cycling career
- Sport: Cycling
- Disciplines: Cyclo-cross, road
- Role: Rider

Professional teams
- 2003–2007: Paged Scout Częstochowa
- 2008–2011: Legia

Marek Cichosz (June 9, 1979 – May 13, 2012) was a Polish professional racing cyclist.

== Career highlights ==
- 2007: 3rd, Cyclo-cross Military World Championship

National cyclo-cross championships record

Year	Placing	Category	Location
1999	2	U23	
2000	2	U23	
2001	1	U23	
2003	3	Elite	Złoty Potok
2006	1	Elite	Slubice
2007	1	Elite	Kozienice
2008	3	Elite	Złoty Potok
2009	2	Elite	Górzyca
2010	3	Elite	Szczekociny
2011	2	Elite	Gościęcin
2012	2	Elite	Ełk
