= Aaron Schooler =

Canadian cyclo-cross cyclist

Personal information
- Born: 20 June 1985 (age 41)

Cycling career
- Sport: Cycling
- Discipline: Cyclo-cross
- Role: Rider

Amateur team
- Focus CX Team, Focus CX Canada

Aaron Schooler (born 20 June 1985) is a Canadian male cyclo-cross cyclist. He represented his nation in the men's elite event at the 2016 UCI Cyclo-cross World Championships in Heusden-Zolder.
