= Klaas Vantornout =

Belgian cyclist

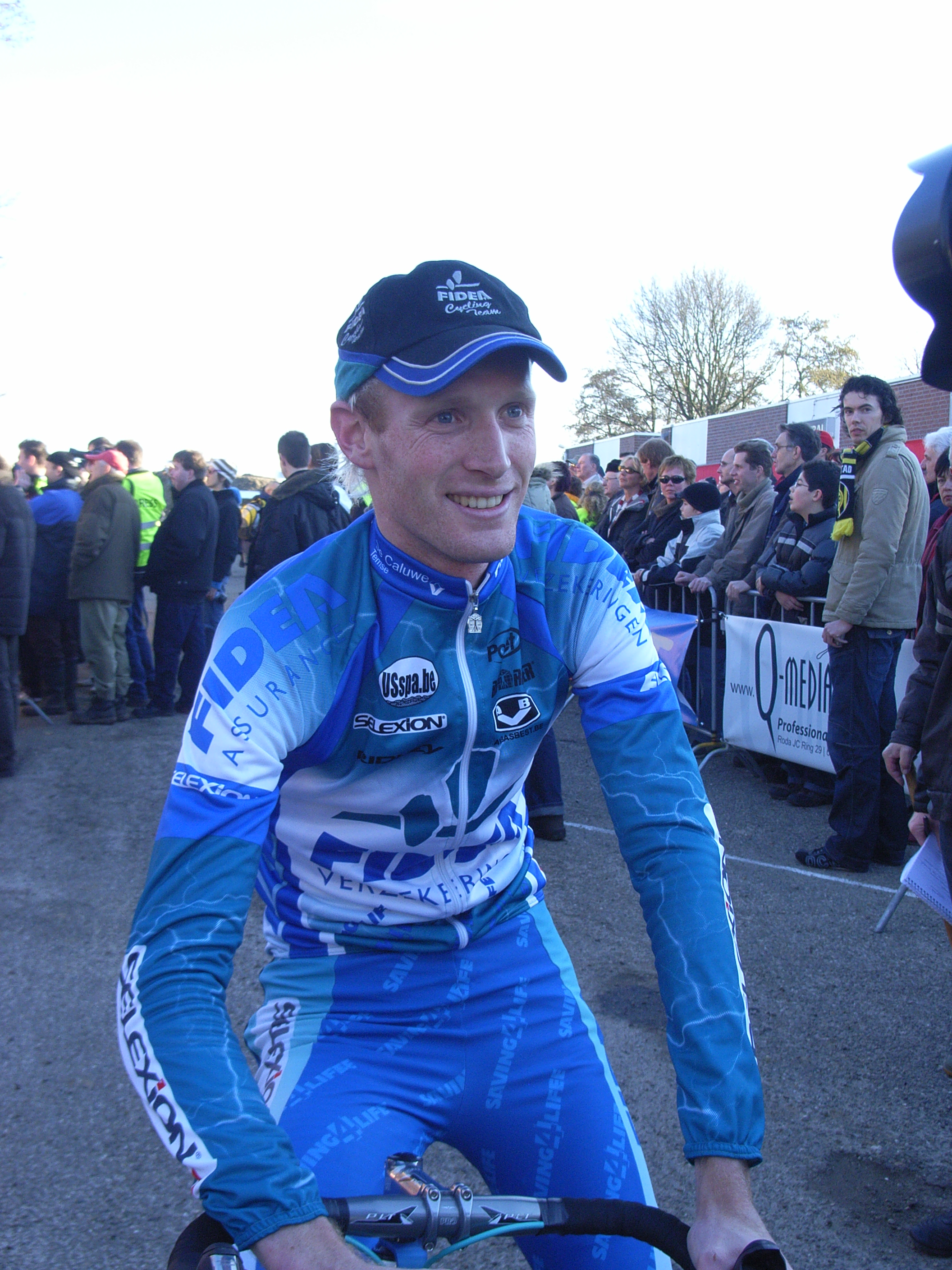

Personal information
- Full name: Klaas Vantornout
- Born: 19 May 1982 (age 44) Torhout, Belgium

Cycling career
- Sport: Cycling
- Current team: Retired
- Disciplines: Cyclo-cross; Road
- Role: Rider

Professional teams
- 2006–2008: Fidea
- 2008–2018: Sunweb–Projob

Major wins
- Cyclo-cross National Championships (2013, 2015)
Medal record
Representing Belgium
Men's cyclo-cross
World Championships
Silver medal – second place	2010 Tábor	Elite
Silver medal – second place	2013 Louisville	Elite

Klaas Vantornout (born 19 May 1982 in Torhout) is a Belgian former professional racing cyclist, who rode professionally between 2006 and 2018 for the Fidea and Marlux–Bingoal teams. Vantornout was the winner of the Belgian National Cyclo-cross Championships in 2013 and 2015.

== Major results ==
=== Cyclo-cross ===
1999–2000
3rd National Junior Championships
2000–2001
1st Lichtaart
2002–2003
1st Zelzate
2003–2004
UCI Under-23 World Cup

1st Pijnacker

Under-23 Superprestige

1st Ruddervoorde

Under-23 Gazet van Antwerpen

1st Koppenbergcross

1st Steinmaur
1st Beuvry
2005–2006
1st Contern
2006–2007
2nd National Championships
UCI World Cup

3rd Igorre

2007–2008
1st Eeklo
1st Ichtegem
1st Overijse
1st Bredene
1st Heerlen
1st Knokke-Heist
2008–2009
Superprestige

1st Gieten

1st Bredene
1st Woerden
2009–2010
1st Otegem
2nd UCI World Championships
2nd National Championships
2010–2011
Superprestige

1st Middelkerke

1st Eeklo
2012–2013
1st National Championships
1st Otegem
1st Ardooie
2nd UCI World Championships
3rd Overall Superprestige

1st Gieten
1st Middelkerke
2nd Gavere
2nd Hoogstraten

3rd Mechelen
2013–2014
Superprestige

1st Ruddervoorde
2nd Hoogstraten
3rd Gavere
3rd Zonhoven

1st Ardooie
2014–2015
1st National Championships
Superprestige

1st Gavere

1st Erpe-Mere
2016–2017
EKZ CrossTour

1st Baden

3rd Ardooie
2017–2018
EKZ CrossTour

1st Baden

=== Road ===
2012
3rd Ronde van Limburg
