= Mariusz Gil =

Polish cyclo-cross cyclist

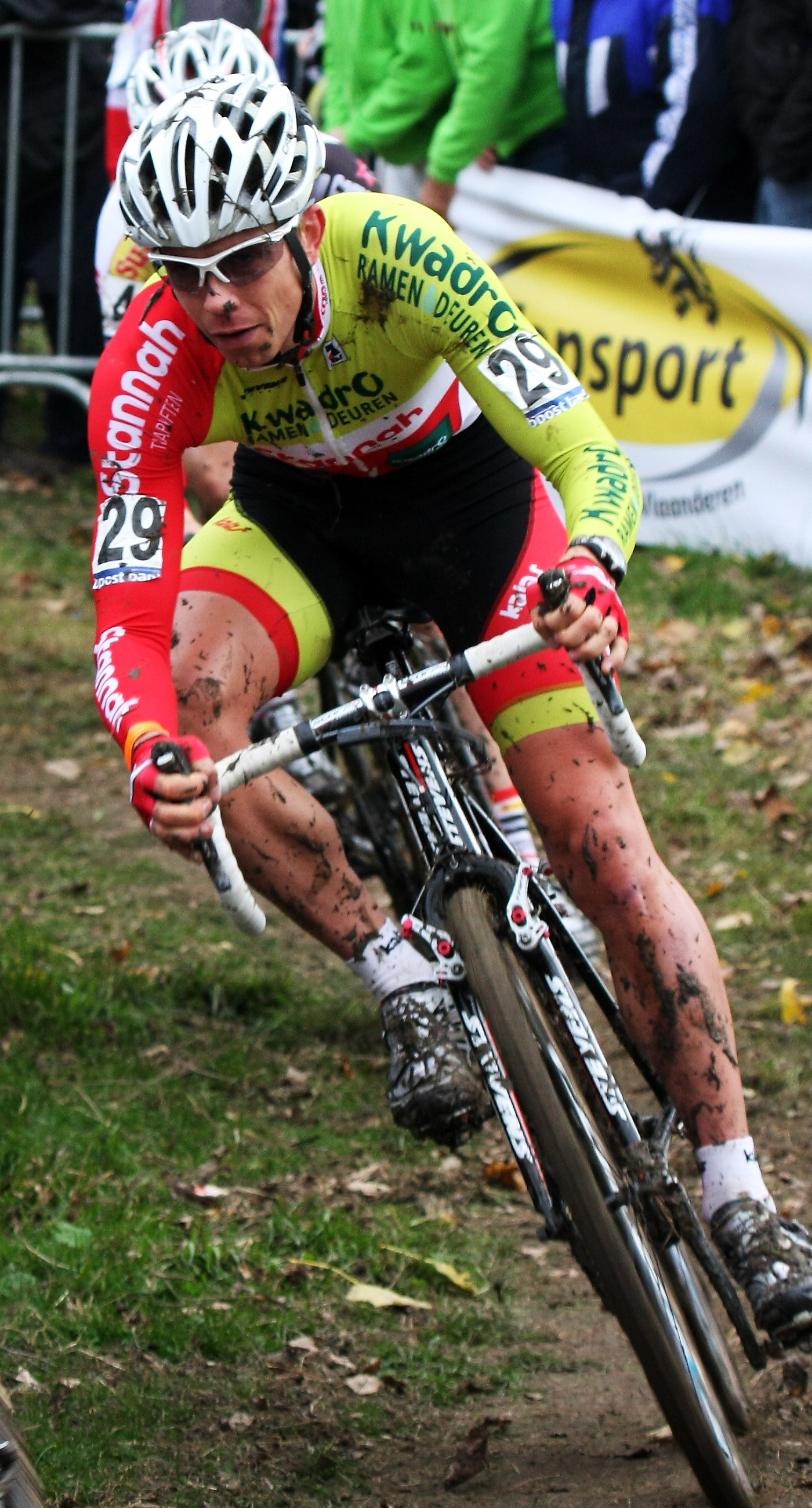
- Gil in 2013

Personal information
- Born: 6 May 1983 (age 43)

Cycling career
- Sport: Cycling
- Discipline: Cyclo-cross
- Role: Rider

Mariusz Gil (born 6 May 1983) is a Polish male cyclo-cross cyclist. He represented his nation in the men's elite event at the 2016 UCI Cyclo-cross World Championships in Heusden-Zolder.
