= Milan Barényi =

Slovak cyclist (born 1974)

Personal information
- Born: 14 January 1974 (age 52) Bojnice, Czechoslovakia

Cycling career
- Sport: Cycling
- Disciplines: Cyclo-cross, road, mountain
- Role: Rider

Milan Barényi (born 14 January 1974) is a Slovak cyclist, who specializes in cyclo-cross. He also competes on the road and in cross-country mountain biking.

== Major results ==
=== Cyclo-cross ===
1998–99
2nd National Cyclo-cross Championships
2003–04
2nd National Cyclo-cross Championships
2004–05
1st National Cyclo-cross Championships
2005–06
1st National Cyclo-cross Championships
2006–07
2nd National Cyclo-cross Championships
3rd Grand Prix Ayuntamiento de Ispaster
2007–08
1st National Cyclo-cross Championships
2008–09
1st National Cyclo-cross Championships
3rd Cyclo-cross International Podbrezová
2009–10
1st Cyclo-cross International Podbrezová
2010–11
2nd National Cyclo-cross Championships
2012–13
3rd National Cyclo-cross Championships
2013–14
2nd International Cyclocross Marikovská Dolina

=== Road ===
2009
2nd Overall Tour du Cameroun

1st Stage 1

2010
1st Overall Tour du Cameroun
2011
1st Stage 6 Tour of Guiana
2012
5th Overall Tour du Cameroun

1st Stage 8

2013
3rd National Time Trial Championships

=== Mountain bike ===
2005
1st National Cross-country Championships
2006
1st National Cross-country Championships
2008
1st National Cross-country Championships
1st National Cross-country Marathon Championships
2013
2nd National Cross-country Championships
