= Francis Mourey =

French cyclist

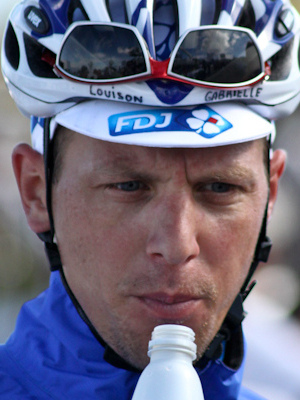
- Mourey at the 2011 Tour de l'Ain

Personal information
- Full name: Francis Mourey
- Born: 8 December 1980 (age 45) Chazot, France
- Height: 1.71 m (5 ft 7 in)
- Weight: 62 kg (137 lb)

Cycling career
- Sport: Cycling
- Current team: Retired
- Disciplines: Road; Cyclo-cross
- Role: Rider

Professional teams
- 2004–2015: FDJeux.com
- 2016–2017: Fortuneo–Vital Concept
Medal record
Representing France
Men's cyclo-cross
World Championships
Bronze medal – third place	2006 Zeddam	Cyclo-cross

Francis Mourey (born 8 December 1980) is a French former professional cyclo-cross and road bicycle racer, who rode professionally between 2004 and 2017.

He won the 2013 Tro-Bro Léon, leading home an FDJ clean sweep of the podium as teammates Johan Le Bon and Anthony Geslin followed him across the finish line. In October 2015 Mourey announced that he would leave FDJ and join Fortuneo–Vital Concept for the 2016 season, reuniting him with former FDJ teammates Pierrick Fédrigo, Yauheni Hutarovich and Arnaud Gérard.

== Major results ==
2000
7th Manx Trophy
2004
1st Stage 2 Route du Sud
2005
1st National Cyclo-cross Championships
2006
2nd National Cyclo-cross Championships
3rd UCI Cyclo-cross World Championships
2007
1st National Cyclo-cross Championships
6th Tour du Doubs
2008
1st National Cyclo-cross Championships
7th Overall Tour du Limousin
2009
1st National Cyclo-cross Championships
2010
1st National Cyclo-cross Championships
2011
1st National Cyclo-cross Championships
2013
1st National Cyclo-cross Championships
1st Tro-Bro Léon
1st Stage 5 Circuit de la Sarthe
5th Cholet-Pays de Loire
2014
1st National Cyclo-cross Championships
2015
8th Tro-Bro Léon
