= Jingle Cross =

Bicycle race held in Iowa, United States

Race details
- Region: Iowa City, United States
- Discipline: Cyclo-cross
- Competition: UCI Cyclo-cross World Cup
- Web site: jinglecross.com

History (men)
- First edition: 2007
- Editions: 13 (as of 2019)

History (women)
- First edition: 2007
- Editions: 13 (as of 2019)

The Jingle Cross Cyclo-cross festival, also known as Jingle Cross, is a cyclo-cross race held annually in Iowa City, Iowa, and founded and directed by John Meehan, a pediatric surgeon who has been involved in professional cycling both as a physician for the former Bissell Pro Cycling team and a race director and promotor for Jingle Cross. Jingle Cross began as a small grassroots race with a single day race in 2004 and 60 competitors and expanded to two days in 2006. The 2007 edition was the first year with UCI events and expanded to 3 days in 2009 adding night time racing. Jingle Cross upgraded to a UCI C1 event in 2010 and soon became the largest cyclo-cross festival in North America. Jingle Cross was part of the UCI Cyclo-cross World Cup from 2016 to 2019.. The 2020 edition of Jingle Cross was cancelled due to the COVID-19 pandemic.

Jingle Cross is known for its challenging and holiday themed course. Originally held in December and late November, the venue and race course features many Christmas themed obstacles such as the Luge Run, Holly-Jolly Hell Hole, and Christmas Barn. The most famous element is Mt. Krumpit, a challenging climb which riders have to traverse in multiple locations as many as 3 times per lap. Jingle Cross moved to September in 2016 in order to be part of the UCI World Cup Series but kept the Holiday theme. Other events at the festival include an expanding gravel series and events for children. The festival also includes the Jingle Cross Doggy Cross, a cyclo-cross themed event for dogs, an international wine walk, an Oktoberfest, and a music festival.

Jingle Cross is owned and operated by Jingle Cross, Inc, a 501(c)(3) non-profit organization. All proceeds from all festival activities are donated to local children's charities with the University of Iowa's Stead Family Children's Hospital as the primary beneficiary. Children from the hospital take part in the winner's podium celebration.

== Past UCI men's winners ==
=== Race 1 ===
Year	Winner	Second	Third
2007	(United States) Todd Wells	(United States) Chris Horner	(United States) Bjørn Selander
2008	(United States) Troy Wells	(United States) Todd Wells	(United States) Andy Jacques-Maynes
2009	(United States) Todd Wells	(United States) Troy Wells	(United States) Ryan Iddings
2010	(United States) Jamey Driscoll	(United States) Barry Wicks	(United States) Christopher Jones
2011	(United States) Jamey Driscoll	(United States) Christopher Jones	(United States) Timothy Johnson
2012	(United States) Jamey Driscoll	(United States) Christopher Jones	(Belgium) Ben Berden
2013	(United States) Jeremy Powers	(Belgium) Ben Berden	(United States) James Driscoll
2014	(Belgium) Ben Berden	(United States) Jamey Driscoll	(United States) Brian Matter
2015	(United States) Jonathan Page	(United States) Andrew Dillman	(United States) Allen Krughoff
2016	(Germany) Marcel Meisen	(United States) Curtis White	(United States) Daniel Summerhill
2017	(Belgium) Laurens Sweeck	(Belgium) Quinten Hermans	(Netherlands) Lars Van Der Haar
2018	(Belgium) Diether Sweeck	(Netherlands) Stan Godrie	(France) Aloïs Falenta
2019	(Belgium) Lander Loockx	(France) Steve Chainel	(Spain) Felipe Orts Lloret

=== Race 2 ===
Year	Winner	Second	Third
2007	(United States) Todd Wells	(United States) Chris Horner	(United States) Tristan Schouten
2008	(United States) Todd Wells	(United States) Andy Jacques-Maynes	(United States) Steve Tilford
2009	(United States) Todd Wells	(United States) Tristan Schouten	(United States) Brian Matter
2010	(United States) Ryan Trebon	(United States) Todd Wells	(United States) Christopher Jones
2011	(United States) Todd Wells	(United States) Christopher Jones	(United States) Tristan Schouten
2012	(United States) Timothy Johnson	(United States) Ryan Trebon	(Belgium) Ben Berden
2013	(United States) Jeremy Powers	(Belgium) Ben Berden	(United States) Adam Craig
2014	(United States) Jeremy Powers	(United States) Stephen Hyde	(United States) Logan Owen
2015	(United States) Jeremy Powers	(United States) Logan Owen	(United States) Stephen Hyde
World Cup
2016	(Belgium) Wout van Aert	(Belgium) Kevin Pauwels	(Belgium) Laurens Sweeck
C1
2017	(Belgium) Gianni Vermeersch	(France) Steve Chainel	(United States) Tobin Ortenblad
World Cup
2018	(Belgium) Toon Aerts	(Belgium) Wout van Aert	(Belgium) Michael Vanthourenhout
2019	(Belgium) Eli Iserbyt	(Belgium) Toon Aerts	(Belgium) Daan Soete

=== Race 3 ===
Year	Winner	Second	Third
2009	(United States) Todd Wells	(United States) Ryan Iddings	(United States) Mark Lalonde
2010	(United States) Jamey Driscoll	(United States) Todd Wells	(United States) Christopher Jones
2011	(United States) Timothy Johnson	(United States) Jamey Driscoll	(United States) Todd Wells
2012	(United States) Timothy Johnson	(United States) Jamey Driscoll	(Belgium) Ben Berden
2013	(United States) Timothy Johnson	(United States) Jeremy Powers	(Belgium) Ben Berden
2014	(United States) Jamey Driscoll	(Canada) Michael Van Den Ham	(United States) Kerry Werner
2015	(United States) Jamey Driscoll	(United States) Stephen Hyde	(United States) Jonathan Page
2016	(Netherlands) David Van Der Poel	(Belgium) Gianni Vermeersch	(Belgium) Diether Sweeck
World Cup
2017	(Netherlands) Mathieu Van Der Poel	(Belgium) Laurens Sweeck	(Belgium) Quinten Hermans
C1
2018	(Belgium) Nicolas Cleppe	(Netherlands) Sieben Wouters	(Czech Republic) Michael Boros
2019	(Belgium) Gianni Vermeersch	(Belgium) Vincent Baestaens	(Belgium) Jim Aernouts

== Past UCI women's winners ==
=== Race 1 ===
Year	Winner	Second	Third
2007	(United States) Wendy Williams	(United States) Susan Butler	(United States) Linda Sone
2008	(United States) Devon Gorry	(United States) Lisa Strong	(United States) Josie Beggs Jacques-Maynes
2009	(United States) Meredith Miller	(United States) Kaitlin Keough	(United States) Kristin Wentworth
2010	(United States) Meredith Miller	(United States) Nicole Duke	(United States) Amanda Miller
2011	(United States) Meredith Miller	(United States) Teal Stetson-Lee	(United States) Susan Butler
2012	(United Kingdom) Helen Wyman	(France) Julie Krasniak	(United States) Jade Wilcoxson
2013	(Czech Republic) Kateřina Nash	(United States) Amanda Miller	(United States) Meredith Miller
2014	(Czech Republic) Kateřina Nash	(United States) Courtenay McFadden	(United States) Meredith Miller
2015	(France) Caroline Mani	(United States) Kaitlin Keough	(United States) Katie Compton
2016	(United Kingdom) Helen Wyman	(United States) Elle Anderson	(United States) Emma White
2017	(United States) Kaitlin Keough	(United States) Katie Compton	(France) Caroline Mani
2018	(United Kingdom) Helen Wyman	(United States) Lily Williams	(United States) Raylyn Nuss
2019	(Canada) Jenn Jackson	(Netherlands) Manon Bakker	(United States) Raylyn Nuss

=== Race 2 ===
Year	Winner	Second	Third
2007	(United States) Susan Butler	(United States) Wendy Williams	(United States) Sydney Brown
2008	(United States) Amanda Miller	(United States) Josie Beggs Jacques-Maynes	(United States) Sydney Brown
2009	(United States) Meredith Miller	(United States) Linda Sone	(United States) Kari Studley
2010	(United States) Amanda Miller	(United States) Nicole Duke	(United States) Devon Gorry
2011	(United States) Teal Stetson-Lee	(United States) Meredith Miller	(United States) Susan Butler
2012	(United Kingdom) Helen Wyman	(United States) Amanda Miller	(United States) Carmen Small
2013	(Czech Republic) Kateřina Nash	(Canada) Catharine Pendrel	(United States) Elle Anderson
2014	(Czech Republic) Kateřina Nash	(France) Caroline Mani	(United States) Courtenay McFadden
2015	(Czech Republic) Kateřina Nash	(France) Caroline Mani	(United States) Katie Compton
World Cup
2016	(United States) Katie Compton	(France) Caroline Mani	(United States) Kaitlin Keough
C1
2017	(United States) Sunny Gilbert	(United States) Clara Honsinger	(Argentina) Sofia Gomez Villafane
World Cup
2018	(United States) Kaitlin Keough	(United Kingdom) Evie Richards	(Netherlands) Marianne Vos
2019	(Canada) Maghalie Rochette	(Czech Republic) Kateřina Nash	(United States) Clara Honsinger

=== Race 3 ===
Year	Winner	Second	Third
2009	(United States) Meredith Miller	(United States) Kaitlin Keough	(United States) Kristin Wentworth
2010	(United States) Amanda Miller	(United States) Meredith Miller	(United States) Nicole Duke
2011	(United States) Meredith Miller	(United States) Maureen Bruno Roy	(France) Julie Krasniak
2012	(United Kingdom) Helen Wyman	(France) Julie Krasniak	(United States) Amanda Miller
2013	(Czech Republic) Kateřina Nash	(United States) Elle Anderson	(United States) Amanda Miller
2014	(United States) Courtenay McFadden	(Czech Republic) Kateřina Nash	(United States) Sunny Gilbert
2015	(Czech Republic) Kateřina Nash	(France) Caroline Mani	(United States) Katie Compton
2016	(Czech Republic) Kateřina Nash	(United States) Ellen Noble	(Italy) Eva Lechner
World Cup
2017	(Czech Republic) Kateřina Nash	(United States) Kaitlin Keough	(Belgium) Sanne Cant
C1
2018	(Czech Republic) Kateřina Nash	(Canada) Maghalie Rochette	(United States) Ellen Noble
2019	(Canada) Maghalie Rochette	(Czech Republic) Kateřina Nash	(United Kingdom) Evie Richards
