= 2008–09 in men's cyclo-cross =

2008–09 in men's cyclo-cross covers the major Cyclo-cross competitions in the 2008–09 season, which runs from September 2008 until March 2009.

The competitions considered are the World Championships, National championships, the World Cup, the Superprestige and the Gazet van Antwerpen Trophy. Results of single day races of type C1 (the highest class) are also given.

== World championships ==
Date	Place	Winner	2nd	3rd
1 February 2009	(Netherlands) Hoogerheide	Niels Albert (BEL)	Zdeněk Štybar (CZE)	Sven Nys (BEL)

== National Championships ==
Date	Nation	Winner	2nd	3rd
11 October 2008	Canada	Geoff Kabush	Mike Garrigan	Derrick St. John
29 November 2008	Sweden	Jens Westergren	Emil Lindgren	Fredrik Ericsson
12 December 2008	United States	Ryan Trebon	James Driscoll	Jonathan Page
13 December 2008	Slovakia	Milan Barenyi	Vaclav Metlicka	Maroš Kováč
14 December 2008	(Japan)	Keiichi Tsujiura	Masanori Kosaka	Seigo Yamamoto
10 January 2009	Czech Republic	Zdeněk Štybar	Radomír Šimůnek	Petr Dlask
11 January 2009	Belgium	Sven Nys	Niels Albert	Kevin Pauwels
11 January 2009	France	Francis Mourey	Steve Chainel	Julien Belgy
11 January 2009	(Germany)	Philipp Walsleben	René Birkenfeld	Paul Voss
11 January 2009	Netherlands	Lars Boom	Thijs Al	Richard Groenendaal

== World Cup ==
Date	Place	Winner	2nd	3rd
19 October 2008	(Belgium) Kalmthout	Sven Nys (BEL)	Niels Albert (BEL)	Kevin Pauwels (BEL)
26 October 2008	(Czech Republic) Tábor	Niels Albert (BEL)	Zdeněk Štybar (CZE)	Martin Bína (CZE)
9 November 2008	(Netherlands) Pijnacker	Lars Boom (NED)	Niels Albert (BEL)	Sven Nys (BEL)
29 November 2008	(Belgium) Koksijde	Erwin Vervecken (BEL)	Sven Nys (BEL)	Zdeněk Štybar (CZE)
7 December 2008	(Spain) Igorre	Sven Nys (BEL)	Klaas Vantornout (BEL)	Erwin Vervecken (BEL)
21 December 2008	(France) Nommay	Lars Boom (NED)	Sven Nys (BEL)	Bart Wellens (BEL)
26 December 2008	(Belgium) Hofstade	Thijs Al (NED)	Kevin Pauwels (BEL)	Sven Vanthourenhout (BEL)
18 January 2009	(France) Roubaix	Erwin Vervecken (BEL)	Zdeněk Štybar (CZE)	Sven Nys (BEL)
25 January 2009	(Italy) Milan	Sven Nys (BEL)	Lars Boom (NED)	Zdeněk Štybar (CZE)

== Superprestige ==
Date	Place	Winner	2nd	3rd
12 October 2008	(Belgium) Ruddervoorde	Sven Nys (BEL)	Klaas Vantornout (BEL)	Niels Albert (BEL)
2 November 2008	(Netherlands) Veghel	Niels Albert (BEL)	Lars Boom (NED)	Sven Nys (BEL)
16 November 2008	(Belgium) Asper-Gavere	Sven Nys (BEL)	Bart Wellens (BEL)	Klaas Vantornout (BEL)
23 November 2008	(Belgium) Hamme-Zogge	Sven Nys (BEL)	Klaas Vantornout (BEL)	Bart Wellens (BEL)
30 November 2008	(Netherlands) Gieten	Klaas Vantornout (BEL)	Bart Wellens (BEL)	Sven Nys (BEL)
28 December 2008	(Belgium) Diegem	Zdeněk Štybar (CZE)	Klaas Vantornout (BEL)	Sven Nys (BEL)
8 February 2009	(Belgium) Hoogstraten			
12 February 2009	(Belgium) Vorselaar			

== Gazet van Antwerpen ==
Date	Place	Winner	2nd	3rd
1 November 2008	(Belgium) Oudenaarde	(Belgium) Sven Nys	(Netherlands) Lars Boom	(Belgium) Niels Albert
11 November 2008	(Belgium) Niel	(Netherlands) Lars Boom	(Belgium) Niels Albert	(Belgium) Sven Nys
22 November 2008	(Belgium) Hasselt	(Belgium) Bart Wellens	(Belgium) Kevin Pauwels	(Belgium) Rob Peeters
13 December 2008	(Belgium) Essen	(Belgium) Sven Nys	(Czech Republic) Zdeněk Štybar	(Netherlands) Thijs Al
30 December 2008	(Belgium) Loenhout	(Czech Republic) Zdeněk Štybar	(Belgium) Sven Nys	(Czech Republic) Radomír Šimůnek
1 January 2009	(Belgium) Baal	(Belgium) Sven Nys	(Czech Republic) Zdeněk Štybar	(Belgium) Niels Albert
7 February 2009	(Belgium) Lille	(Belgium) Niels Albert	(Belgium) Sven Nys	(Belgium) Bart Wellens
22 February 2009	(Belgium) Oostmalle			

== Other Major (Class C1) 2008–09 Cyclo-cross races ==
Date	Place	Winner	Second	Third
24 September 2008	(United States) Cross Vegas	(United States) Ryan Trebon	(United States) Timothy Johnson	(United States) Adam Craig
5 October 2008	(Switzerland) Badiquer Schmerikon	(Belgium) Bart Aernouts	(Switzerland) Simon Zahner	(Switzerland) Florian Vogel
12 October 2008	(United States) Bio Wheels / United Dairy Farmers UCI Harbin Park	(United States) Jeremy Powers	(United States) Jeremiah Bishop	(United States) Troy Wells
18 October 2008	(United States) Granogue Cross	(United States) Ryan Trebon	(United States) Jeremy Powers	(United States) Timothy Johnson
2 November 2008	(United States) Boulder Cup	(United States) Timothy Johnson	(United States) Todd Wells	(United States) Ryan Trebon
8 November 2008	(Canada) Centennial Park Cross	(United States) Jeremy Powers	(United States) Timothy Johnson	(United States) Nicholas Weighall
9 November 2008	(Canada) Centennial Park Cross	(United States) Timothy Johnson	(United States) Jeremy Powers	(United States) Andy Jacques-Maynes
15 November 2008	(United States) USGP of Cyclocross – Mercer Cup	(United States) Timothy Johnson	(United States) Todd Wells	(United States) Ryan Trebon
16 November 2008	(United States) USGP of Cyclocross – Mercer Cup	(United States) Todd Wells	(United States) Troy Wells	(United States) Jeremy Powers
22 November 2008	(United States) Whitmore's Landscaping Super Cross Cup 1	(United States) Ryan Trebon	(United States) Jeremy Powers	(United States) Todd Wells
23 November 2008	(United States) Whitmore's Landscaping Super Cross Cup 2	(United States) Todd Wells	(United States) James Driscoll	(United States) Ryan Trebon
6 December 2008	(United States) USGP of Cyclocross – Portland Cup	(United States) Timothy Johnson	(United States) Jeremy Powers	(United States) Ryan Trebon
12 December 2008	(Belgium) Vlaamse Druivenveldrit Overijse	(Belgium) Kevin Pauwels	(Netherlands) Lars Boom	(Belgium) Sven Nys

== See also ==
- 2008-09 UCI Results list
- 2008 and 2009 in sports
- 2007–08 and 2009–10 in men's cyclo-cross.
