= United States National Cyclo-cross Championships =

The United States National Cyclocross Championships is a four-day competition held annually each winter and is sponsored by USA Cycling. The winners at various levels, including elite, U-23, masters, juniors, and collegiate for men and women, wear the coveted stars and stripes jersey and are crowned United States national cyclo-cross champions.

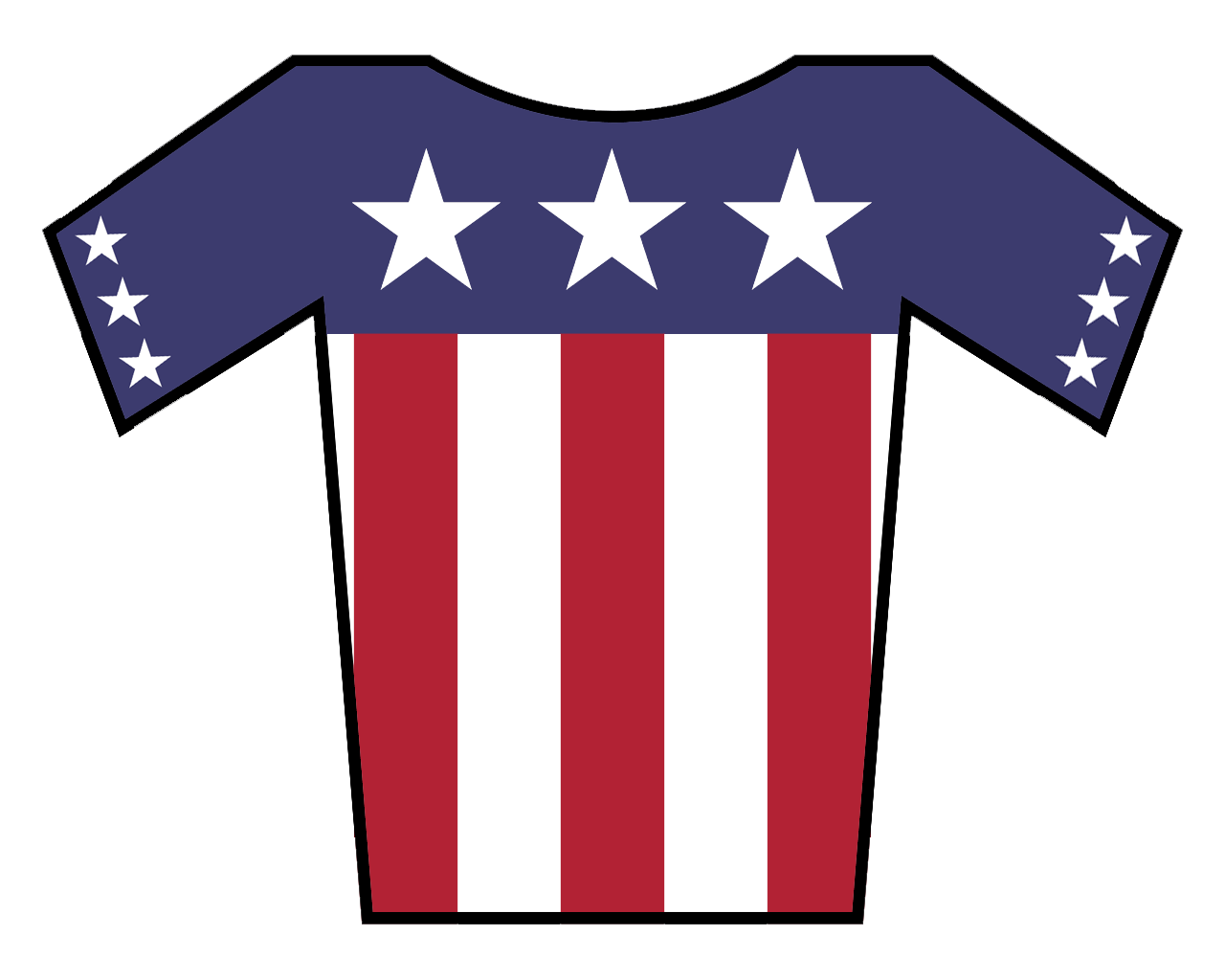
The National Champion competes in the Stars and Stripes Jersey in the next race season.

== Past winners ==
=== Men ===
Year	Location	Gold	Silver	Bronze
2024	Louisville, Kentucky	Andrew Strohmeyer	Eric Brunner	Scott Funston
2023	Louisville, Kentucky	Eric Brunner (2)	Andrew Strohmeyer	Scott Funston
2022	Hartford, Connecticut	Curtis White	Eric Brunner	Kerry Werner
2021	Wheaton, Illinois	Eric Brunner	Gage Hecht	Curtis White
~~2020~~	Cancelled due to COVID-19			
2019	Lakewood, Washington	Gage Hecht	Curtis White	Stephen Hyde
2018 (2018-2019 season)	Louisville, Kentucky	Stephen Hyde (3)	Curtis White	Gage Hecht
2018 (2017-2018 season)	Reno, Nevada	Stephen Hyde (2)	Jeremy Powers	Kerry Werner
2017	Hartford, Connecticut	Stephen Hyde	Jamey Driscoll	Kerry Werner
2016	Asheville, North Carolina	Jeremy Powers (4)	Stephen Hyde	Logan Owen
2015	Austin, Texas	Jeremy Powers (3)	Jonathan Page	Zach McDonald
2014	Boulder, Colorado	Jeremy Powers (2)	Ryan Trebon	Tim Johnson
2013	Madison, Wisconsin	Jonathan Page (4)	Zach McDonald	Jamey Driscoll
2012	Madison, Wisconsin	Jeremy Powers	Ryan Trebon	Jonathan Page
2010	Bend, Oregon	Todd Wells (3)	Ryan Trebon	Jeremy Powers
2009	Bend, Oregon	Tim Johnson (3)	Ryan Trebon	Jonathan Page
2008	Kansas City, Missouri	Ryan Trebon (2)	Jamey Driscoll	Jonathan Page
2007	Kansas City, Kansas	Tim Johnson (2)	Jonathan Page	Todd Wells
2006	Providence, Rhode Island	Ryan Trebon	Jonathan Page	Tim Johnson
2005	Providence, Rhode Island	Todd Wells (2)	Ryan Trebon	Jonathan Page
2004	Portland, Oregon	Jonathan Page (3)	Ryan Trebon	Todd Wells
2003	Portland, Oregon	Jonathan Page (2)	Todd Wells	Ryan Trebon
2002	Napa, California	Jonathan Page	Todd Wells	Travis Brown
2001	Baltimore, Maryland	Todd Wells	Tim Johnson	Marc Gullickson
2000	Overland Park, Kansas	Tim Johnson	Mark Gullickson	Mark McCormack
1999	San Francisco, California (Presidio)	Mark Gullickson	Bart Bowen	Tim Johnson
1998	Fort Devens, Massachusetts	Frank McCormack (2)	Steve Larsen	Jonathan Page
1997	Lakewood, Colorado	Mark McCormack	Frank McCormack	Dale Knapp
1996	Seattle, Washington	Frank McCormack	Mark McCormack	Jan Wiejak
1995	Leicester, Massachusetts	Jan Wiejack (2)	Mark McCormack	Daryl Price
1994	Seattle, Washington	Jan Wiejack	Don Myrah	Dale Knapp
1993	Sonora, California	Don Myrah (4)	Pete Webber	
1992	Golden, Colorado	Mark Howe	Don Myrah	Steve Tilford
1991	Waltham, Massachusetts	Don Myrah (3)	Mark McCormack	
1990	Bremerton, Washington	Don Myrah (2)	Larry Hibbard	Laurence Malone
1989	Milwaukee, Wisconsin	Don Myrah	Jan Wiejak	Paul Curley
1988	Plymouth, Massachusetts	Casey Kunselman	Don Myrah	
1987	Bremerton, Washington	Clark Natwick (4)	Don Myrah	Paul Curley
1986	Scotts Valley, California	Clark Natwick (3)		
1985	Nutley, New Jersey	Paul Curley		Ned Overend
1984	Santa Cruz, California	Steve Tilford	Roy Knickman	Laurence Malone
1983	Plymouth, Massachusetts	Steve Tilford	Clark Natwick	Tim Rutledge
1982	Nutley, New Jersey	Roy Knickman	Clark Natwick	Steve Tilford
1981	Pacifica, California	Clark Natwick (1)	Myron Lind	Joe Ryan
1980	Colorado Springs, Colorado	Joe Ryan	Mark Jansen	Davis Phinney
1979	Eugene, Oregon	Laurence Malone (5)	Joe Ryan	Clark Natwick
1978	Austin, Texas	Laurence Malone (4)	Clark Natwick	John Howard
1977	Milwaukee, Wisconsin	Laurence Malone (3)	Clark Natwick	Joe Ryan
1976	Sunriver, Oregon	Laurence Malone (2)	Joe Ryan	Mark Pringle
1975	Berkeley, California	Laurence Malone	Dan Nall	Joe Ryan
1970-74	NOT HELD			
1969	Palos Park, Illinois	John Howard	Herman Kron	Leroy "Tyger" Johnson
1968	Florissant, Missouri	Mike Carnahan		
1967	Florissant, Missouri	Leroy "Tyger" Johnson (3)		
1966	Palos Park, Illinois	Leroy "Tyger" Johnson (2)	Herman Kron	John Hood, Jr
1965	Palos Park, Illinois	Herman Kron (2)	Bert Kron	John Hood Sr
1964	Palos Park, Illinois	Herman Kron	Leroy "Tyger" Johnson	Bert Kron
1963	Palos Park, Illinois	Leroy "Tyger" Johnson	Herman Kron	

=== Women ===
Year	Location	Gold	Silver	Bronze
2024	Louisville, Kentucky	Vida Lopez de San Roman	Katie Clouse	Raylyn Nuss
2023	Louisville, Kentucky	Clara Honsinger (4)	Katie Clouse	Raylyn Nuss
2022	Hartford, Connecticut	Clara Honsinger (3)	Raylyn Nuss	Austin Killips
2021	Wheaton, Illinois	Clara Honsinger (2)	Raylyn Nuss	Sunny Gilbert
~~2020~~	Cancelled due to COVID-19			
2019	Lakewood, Washington	Clara Honsinger	Rebecca Fahringer	Katie Compton
2018 (2018-2019 season)	Louisville, Kentucky	Katie Compton (15)	Sunny Gilbert	Ellen Noble
2018 (2017-2018 season)	Reno, Nevada	Katie Compton (14)	Ellen Noble	Kaitlin Keough
2017	Hartford, Connecticut	Katie Compton (13)	Amanda Miller	Kaitlin Antonneau
2016	Asheville, North Carolina	Katie Compton (12)	Georgia Gould	Kaitlin Antonneau
2015	Austin, Texas	Katie Compton (11)	Kaitlin Antonneau	Rachel Lloyd
2014	Boulder, Colorado	Katie Compton (10)	Elle Anderson	Meredith Miller
2013	Madison, Wisconsin	Katie Compton (9)	Jade Wilcoxson	Nicole Duke
2012	Madison, Wisconsin	Katie Compton (8)	Kaitlin Antonneau	Nicole Duke
2010	Bend, Oregon	Katie Compton (7)	Georgia Gould	Meredith Miller
2009	Bend, Oregon	Katie Compton (6)	Meredith Miller	Amy Dombroski
2008	Kansas City, Missouri	Katie Compton (5)	Georgia Gould	Rachel Lloyd
2007	Kansas City, Kansas	Katie Compton (4)	Rachel Lloyd	Georgia Gould
2006	Providence, Rhode Island	Katie Compton (3)	Georgia Gould	Kerry Barnholt
2005	Providence, Rhode Island	Katie Compton (2)	Ann Knapp	Maureen Bruno Roy
2004	Portland, Oregon	Katie Compton	Gina Hall	Ann Knapp
2003	Portland, Oregon	Alison Dunlap (6)	Rachel Lloyd	Gina Hall
2002	Napa, California	Ann Grande	Rachel Lloyd	Gina Hall
2001	Baltimore, Maryland	Alison Dunlap (5)	Carmen D’Aluisio	Rachel Lloyd
2000	Overland Park, Kansas	Alison Dunlap (4)	Ann Grande	Rachel Lloyd
1999	San Francisco, California (Presidio)	Alison Dunlap (3)	Ann Grande	Shari Kain
1998	Fort Devens, Massachusetts	Alison Dunlap (2)	Ann Grande	Carmen Richardson
1997	Lakewood, Colorado	Alison Dunlap	Miranda Briggs	Ruthie Matthes
1996	Seattle, Washington	Shari Kain (2)	Jan Bolland	Alison Dunlap
1995	Leicester, Massachusetts	Jan Bolland	Shari Kain	Laurie Brandt
1994	Seattle, Washington	Shari Kain		
1993	Sonora, California	Lisa Muhich (2)		
1992	Golden, Colorado	Lisa Muhich	Nancy Reynolds	Kathy Riggert
1991	Waltham, Massachusetts	Kathy Riggert		
1990	Bremerton, Washington	Elizabeth Muhich (3)		Dina DiSantis
1989	Milwaukee, Wisconsin	Elizabeth Muhich (2)	Dina DiSantis	
1988	Plymouth, Massachusetts	Elizabeth Muhich		
1987	Silverdale, Washington	Elizabeth Chapman (2)	Dina DiSantis	
1986	Scotts Valley, California	Elizabeth Chapman		
1978-85	NOT HELD			
1977	Milwaukee, Wisconsin	Joyce Sulanke	Debra Schadewaldt	Joan Johnson
1976	Sunriver, Oregon	Mary Ann Allan (2)	Carolyn Peterson	Joyce Sulanke
1975	Berkeley, California	Mary Ann Allan	Linda Searl	Clara Teyssier
