= 2009 in cycle racing =

2009 in cycle racing may refer to:

- 2009 in men's road cycling
- 2009 in women's road cycling
- 2008–09 in men's cyclo-cross

== See also ==
- 2009 in sports
