= 2008 in cycle racing =

2008 in cycle racing may refer to:

- 2008 in men's road cycling
- 2008 in women's road cycling
- 2008–09 in men's cyclo-cross
- 2008 in track cycling

== See also ==
- 2008 in sports
