= Frank McCormack (cyclist) =

Personal information
- Born: May 28, 1969 (age 57) Plymouth, Massachusetts, U.S.

Cycling career
- Sport: Cycling
- Current team: Retired
- Disciplines: Road, Cyclo-cross
- Role: Rider, team manager

Professional teams
- 1992-1993: IME
- 1994: Carver
- 1994: Saab
- 1995-2002: Saturn

Managerial team
- 2004-2006: Jamis-Hagens Berman

Major wins
- United States National Cyclo-cross Championships (1996)

Frank McCormack (born May 28, 1969, in Plymouth, Massachusetts) is an American former cyclist. His younger brother Mark was also a professional cyclist.

== Palmarès ==
1988
3rd of the United States National Cyclo-cross Championships
1989
3rd of the United States National Cyclo-cross Championships
1990
3rd of the United States National Cyclo-cross Championships
1993
3rd stage Killington Stage Race
1994
Fitchburg Longsjo Classic
1995
Killington Stage Race
1996
United States National Cyclo-cross Championships
1997
2nd stage Killington Stage Race
2nd, 4th, and 7th stages Tour de Langkawi
Thrift Drug Classic
2nd of the United States National Cyclo-cross Championships
2nd of the United States National Road Race Championships
1998
United States National Cyclo-cross Championships
Fitchburg Longsjo Classic
International Cycling Classic
3rd stage Tour of Japan
Tour of Japan
2nd of the United States National Road Race Championships
1999
Sea Otter Classic
Prologue Ster ZLM Toer
2nd overall Ster ZLM Toer
2nd overall Redlands Bicycle Classic
2001
Nature Valley Grand Prix
2003
3rd stage Tour de White Rock
