= Jeremy Powers =

American professional racing cyclist (born 1983)

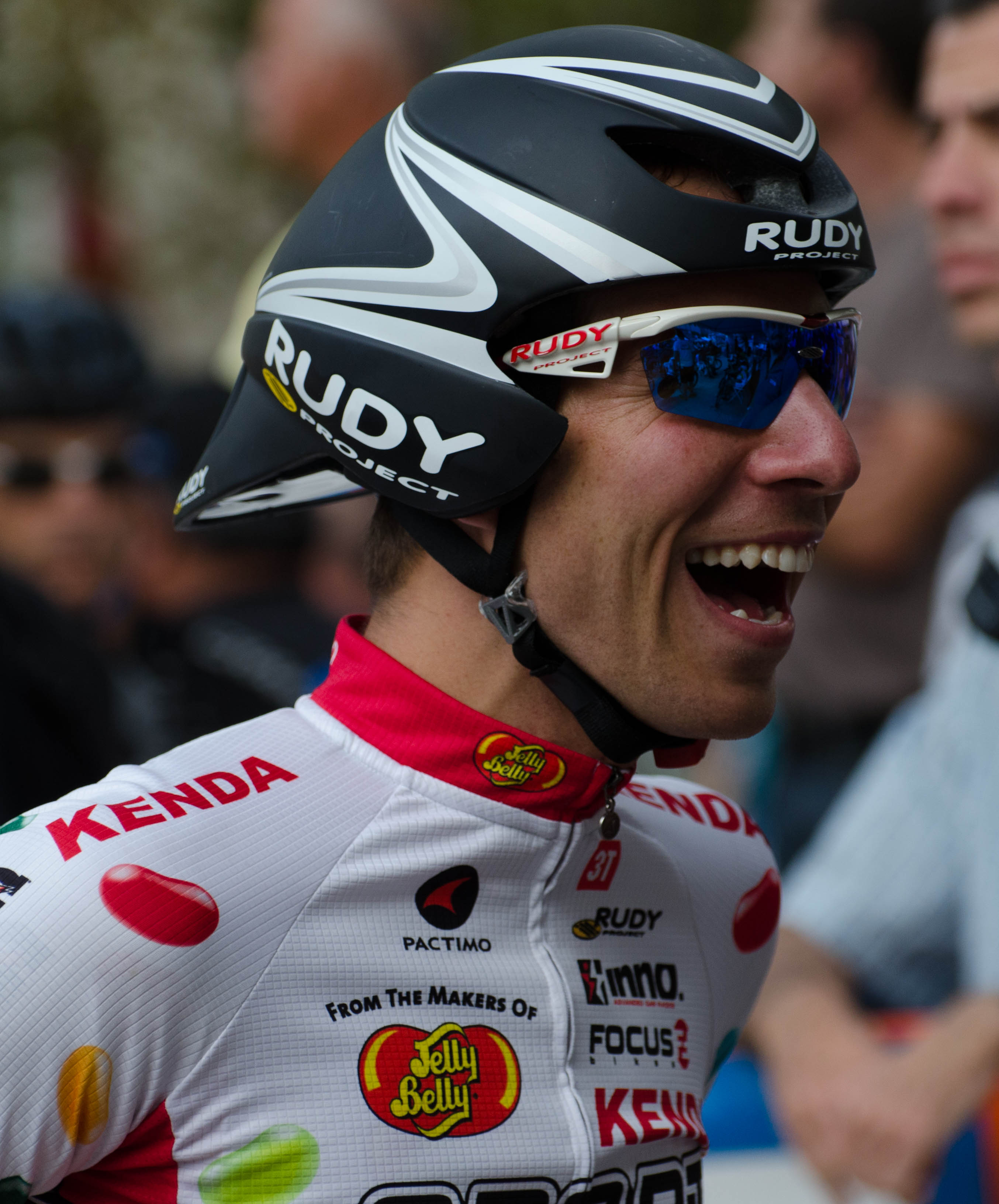
- Powers at the 2013 Tour of Alberta

Personal information
- Full name: Jeremy Powers
- Born: June 29, 1983 (age 43) Niantic, Connecticut
- Height: 1.80 m (5 ft 11 in)
- Weight: 68 kg (150 lb)

Cycling career
- Sport: Cycling
- Disciplines: Cyclo-cross; Road; Mountain biking
- Role: Rider

Professional teams
- 2000–2002: Team Devo
- 2003: NCC/Bikereg.Com
- 2004–2013: Jelly Belly–Aramark
- 2007–2010: Cannondale/Cyclocrossworld.com (cyclo-cross)
- 2011–2014: Rapha–FOCUS (cyclo-cross)
- 2014–2017: Aspire Racing
- 2018–2019: Pactimo–Fuji

Major wins
- Pan-American Cyclo-cross Championships (2015) National Cyclo-cross Championships (2012, 2014–2016) US Gran Prix of Cyclocross (2010–2011)

Jeremy Powers (born June 29, 1983) is an American former professional racing cyclist, who has achieved over 90 UCI victories (the most wins by an American male cyclo-cross rider), four USA Cyclocross national championships, and the 2015 Pan American Championship during his career. He was a presenter for Global Cycling Network before joining WHOOP.

Since rising to the top of the sport, Powers has been involved in various media, developmental, and educational projects aimed at growing the popularity of cyclo-cross in the United States through the JAM Fund, his non-profit organization, Behind THE Barriers video production company, cyclocross camps, instructional DVDs, and he has also collaborated on several cyclo-cross books including Skills Drills and Bellyaches and Mud Snow and Cyclocross.

== Career ==
=== Early career ===
Born in Niantic, Connecticut, Powers' love of cycling was apparent from an early age as he loved to tear around the house on his BMX bike, and it wasn't long before he started turning heads at local mountain bike races. He soon found his way to the Team Devo junior mountain bike program and, with their support, he won his first major race in 2000, the Junior World Cup in Napa Valley, California. Powers was introduced to cyclo-cross early in his cycling career as a way to stay fit at the end of the mountain bike season. It was the only time of the year when roadies and mountain bikers would converge in one place, and test each other's skills and fitness. In his native New England, cyclo-cross has been a regular part of each season for decades, and Powers excelled at the short, fast, technical races. Powers discovered that the frenetic pace and camaraderie of cyclo-cross suited his high energy and outgoing personality.

Powers earned a reputation as a strong rider, and success in New England earned him an invite to the junior race at the 2001 UCI Cyclo-cross World Championships in the Czech Republic. In his first international cyclo-cross race, Powers finished in 17th place. Encouraged by several friends and his coach Adam Myerson, Powers moved to Massachusetts, and changed his focus to road racing; however, Powers achieved one of his most significant victories very early in his career, when he won the 2001 Mountain Bike World Cup Cross Country event in the Junior division in Napa Valley, California.

While attending classes at Westfield State University, Powers tackled road racing, moving from a Category 5 to a Category 1 racer in a few short months, and closed out his road-racing season by signing a contract with Jelly Belly–Aramark for the 2004 season. Powers continued to race competitively in the Junior and Senior divisions of mountain biking, and was also competing in cyclo-cross in New England with the Northampton Cycling Club.

=== Jelly Belly–Aramark ===
Powers would go on to race with Jelly Belly–Aramark at the biggest races in the U.S including the Tour of Georgia, Tour of California, Tour of Colorado, Tour of Missouri and many others. Despite his growing success on the road, every fall he would return to his true passion, cyclo-cross. Following his move to Jelly Belly in 2004, Powers made the decision to race an entire cyclocross campaign in Europe. In the 2004 season, his last as an under-23 rider, Powers returned briefly to the United States for the national championships, where he earned a silver medal. Powers returned to Europe to race full-time in 2005, his first year as an elite, again returning to the America to race the national championships. In 2006, Powers returned to full-time racing in the United States. Powers' full-time racing in Europe had prepared him well for racing in America, and he started to achieve good results in American competitions. Powers had podiums at two US Gran Prix of Cyclocross events, the Xilinx Cup and the Stumptown Cup. Powers also had some good results in his home region of New England, finishing on three podiums and finishing 4th in the Verge New England Cyclocross Championship Series.

A pair of top five time trial results in the 2006 Vuelta de Bisbee propelled him to a sixth place overall finish. Powers rode to prominence on the final stage of the 2008 Tour of Missouri, making half of the day's breakaway that was narrowly captured at the end of the stage. In September 2010, Powers won his first career stage race, winning Vermont's Green Mountain Stage Race by over two minutes ahead of UnitedHealthcare–Maxxis's Tim Johnson, Powers' Cannondale prepared by Cyclocrossworld.com teammate, and Trek–Livestrong's Gavin Mannion. Powers had a very successful 2011 road season with the Jelly Belly–Kenda team, participating in both of the United States' major tours – the Amgen Tour of California and the USA Pro Cycling Challenge. At the USA Pro Cycling Challenge, Powers got into the day's main break in stage 2, eventually won by George Hincapie.

=== Cyclocrossworld.com ===
==== 2007–08 season ====
In 2007 Stu Thorne signed Powers to his Cyclocrossworld.com team, one of the first professional cyclo-cross teams in the U.S., joining Canadian Champion Lyne Bessette on the team. The support enabled Powers to tackle the U.S. Grand Prix of Cyclocross with renewed fervor, and he won his first major event, the Derby City Cup in Louisville, Kentucky that fall. Powers also won three Verge NECCS events.

==== 2008–09 season ====
2008 was Powers' first year with the Cannondale prepared by Cyclocrossworld.com team, and his first year teamed up with Tim Johnson. While Powers missed out on wins in the USGP series, he did stand on the podium at four of their events, and won the first race of the inaugural North American Cyclocross Trophy Series – Star Crossed in Redmond, Washington. Powers won six races in 2008, including his first back-to-back-to-back wins at the UCI3 Festival in Cincinnati, Ohio.

==== 2009–10 season ====
Powers' career was truly in the ascendancy in 2009, his second year with the Cannondale-Cyclocrossworld.com program. Powers accounted for nine of the team's 22 UCI victories in the 2009 cyclocross season, winning the first and last stops in the U.S. Gran Prix of Cyclocross series – the Planet Bike Cup in Sun Prairie, Wisconsin and the Stanley Portland Cup in Portland, Oregon. Powers finished up the season ranked second in the North American Cyclocross Trophy standings, behind teammate Tim Johnson, after winning day two of the Toronto International Cyclocross and finishing on the podium at a further seven races. Thanks to his consistency and some big wins, Powers finished up the 2009 season as the number 11 ranked rider on USA Cycling's Cyclocross Rankings.

==== 2010–11 season ====
Powers' 2010 cyclo-cross season was full of even more firsts. Powers continued his career progression, winning 10 UCI races in the United States, and secured victories in both the US Gran Prix of Cyclocross series and the North American Cyclocross Trophy Series, the first time this had ever happened. In the NACT series, Powers won four events, including a wire-to-wire victory at the first day of the Gran Prix of Gloucester to take home his first elite series title. In the USGP, Powers won the series, his first victory in the USGP at any level. Powers trailed Johnson by 16 points entering the series' final weekend in Portland, Oregon, but pulled even with his teammate following his win on the first day of the Stanley Portland Cup. With the title on the line, Powers proceeded to outsprint Johnson on the second day to win his first series title.

At the United States National Cyclo-cross Championships, Powers was part of the leading duo, when he was the victim of an untimely crash that saw him drop from the race lead to his eventual finishing spot of third. Despite the disappointment, Powers rebounded to finish 16th at the 2011 UCI Cyclo-cross World Championships in St. Wendel in January. Powers again finished the season ranked number 1 on the USA Cycling Cyclocross Rankings and finished 15th on the season's final UCI rankings.

=== Rapha–Focus ===
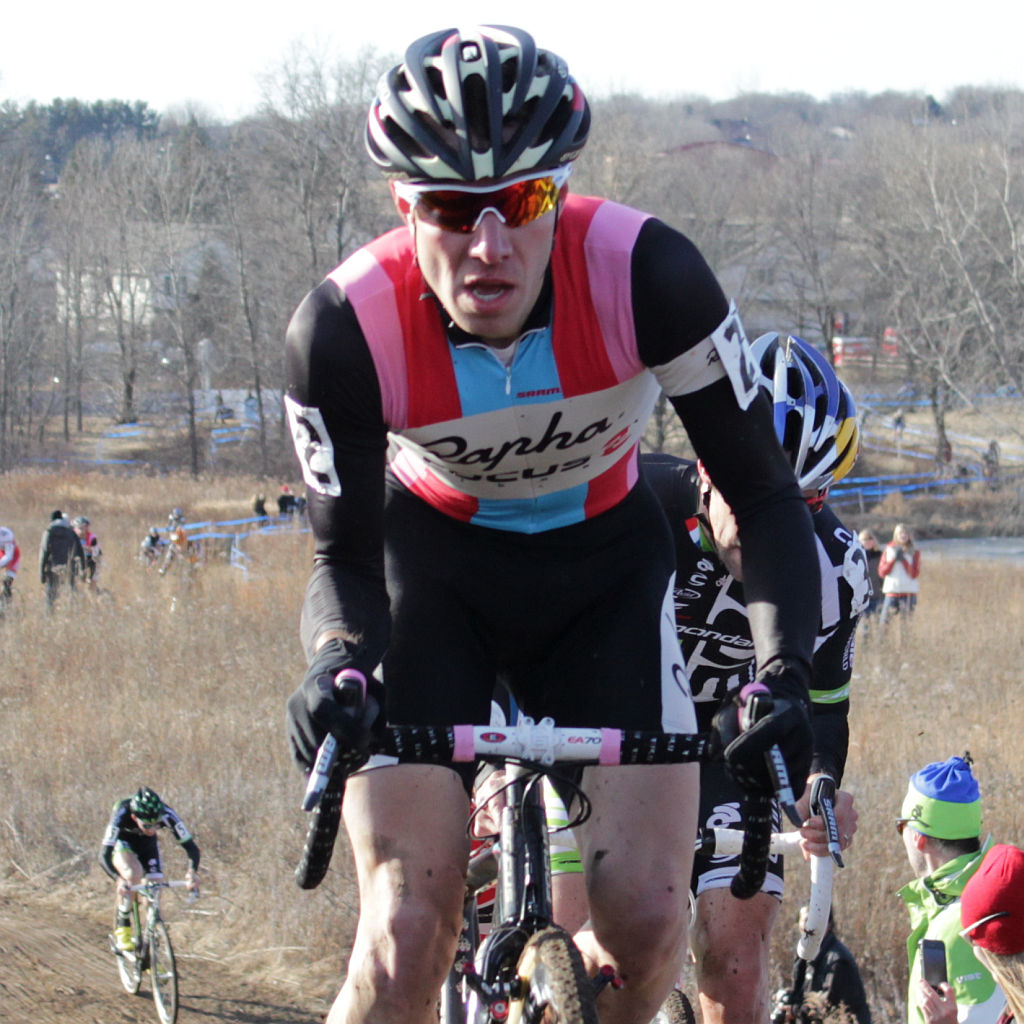
Powers en route to his first United States National Cyclo-cross Championships title.

2011 was Powers' first season with the Rapha–Focus professional cyclocross team. Powers joined Chris Jones, Zach McDonald and, later, Julie Krasniak to create one of the most successful teams of the season in American cyclo-cross. The biggest of Powers' 11 UCI wins was his first United States National Cyclo-cross Championships title, which he won by 17 seconds over former national Champion Ryan Trebon.

In the US Gran Prix of Cyclocross, Powers completed consecutive overall victories, winning the series' final five races, and standing on all but one of the series' podiums. At the Deschutes Brewery Cup in Bend, Oregon, Powers finally got his first victory on a course where he had had some bad luck in the past. 2011 saw Powers stand on 18 UCI podiums in the United States, making it onto all but two of the races that he entered. Internationally, Powers had his best finish at a UCI World Cup when he finished 10th at the World Cup in Plzeň, Czech Republic. Powers was named Velonews North American Cyclocross Rider of the Year for 2011.

Powers posted 14 UCI wins in 2012, winning another US Gran Prix of Cyclocross series and capped his US campaign with another CrossVegas win. Powers also found success in Europe, posting a 7th in the 1st World Cup and finished the season ranked 12th in the World. Powers posted 12 UCI wins in 2013 finishing the season ranked 11th in the world. On US soil, Powers once again was the USA Cycling PROCX Series winner.

In 2014, Powers won his second United States National Cyclo-cross Championships title at Boulder, Colorado. Powers posted 13 UCI wins finishing the year ranked 15th in the world.

=== Aspire Racing ===
Following the 2014 season, Powers launched his own team, Aspire Racing focused solely on cyclo-cross. The 2014/15 campaign marked one of Powers' most successful seasons of his career; he won his third United States National Cyclo-cross Championships title at Austin, Texas. and finished the season ranked ninth in the world.

In 2016, Powers signed Ellen Noble to his Aspire Racing program, a graduate of development program The JAM Fund. While riding for Aspire Racing, Noble earned a silver medal at the 2017 UCI Cyclo-cross World Championships in Bieles, Luxembourg, Noble also won the National and Pan American Championships in the under 23 women's category.

In 2017, Powers extended Noble's contract and signed 20-year-old Spencer Petrov to a one-year deal.

In 2018, Aspire Racing folded with Powers telling CX Magazine: Both Rapha and Focus which were our title sponsors were set to end in March of 2018,..the partnerships are ending on good terms. Rapha and Focus have left for different reasons, I have no ill will or bad blood in anyway. I’m grateful for all of their support, I have friends at both companies and I consider them both to be incredible brands and I’m humbled I got to work with them for this long.

In 2019, Powers raced under the Aspire Racing banner, representing Pactimo, Fuji and SRAM as co-title sponsors.

== Other ventures ==
=== Behind the Barriers ===
In 2010, Jeremy created Behind the Barriers – a web-based video series chronicling the 'day-in-the-life' of a pro cyclo-cross racer. In its first year, the series captured the attention of over 80,000 unique viewers, at that time was a significant viewership. Behind the Barriers formed into Behind the Barriers TV in 2014 and became a hub of American cyclo-cross media. BTB-TV Created shows five different shows, airing Monday-Friday, over the course of two years, the viewership increased to 400,000+ unique visitors from 179 countries. BTB-TV exclusively live streamed several productions over the two years, including the USA National cyclocross championships in Boulder, Colorado and Austin, Texas. Behind the Barriers TV stopped as a media company after the 2015 cyclocross season, with powers posting on his personal website: "I want to sincerely thank everyone who supported BTB TV and watched what we worked so hard to put out there. When I started my original day-in-the-life show, it was so so special to me to share with everyone. I found a way to really tell you all who I was and to share the sport I love. At the end of that we had about 80,000 unique fans from all over the world watching. When it expanded into BTB TV, we grew that base to 400,000 unique fans. So I know you guys are out there. And this is for all of you – I’m sorry I couldn’t crush this one. I was off the front, but I got caught right at the finish"

=== JAM Fund ===
Developed with his longtime friends, Alec Donahue and Mukunda Feldman, the JAM Fund is an acronym for Jeremy, Alec and Mukunda. JAM was created to knock down the barriers of entry into cycling and enrich their local cycling community in Western Massachusetts. The JAM Fund strives to develop young cyclists in all aspects of their lives both on the bike and off. JAM Fund raises money through different avenues and issues grants to riders each year at its Grand FUNdo. JAM Fund has issued up to 40 grants per year to riders who have applied to the program and have displayed commitment and enthusiasm to cycling. JAM Fund holds its yearly fund raiser every July, The Grand FUNdo celebrated its 10th year anniversary in 2019. Alumni include some of the most accomplished talent from the United States cyclocross scene, Ellen Noble, Stephen Hyde (cyclist), Jeremy Durrin, Anthony Clark, Rebecca Fahringer are some of the riders who rode for the JAM Fund in the past decade.

== Major results ==
2000
4th Junior race, National Cyclo-cross Championships
2001
1st Junior cross-country, UCI Mountain Bike World Cup
5th Junior race, National Cyclo-cross Championships
2004
2nd Under-23 race, National Cyclo-cross Championships
2005
4th MRC Sterling Classic Road Race
5th Blount Seafood Fall River Criterium
2006
1st Lower Allen Classic
2nd New York Capital Region Road Race
2nd Wissahickon Cross
3rd Catamount Gran Prix
4th Overall Verge New England Cyclocross Championship Series

2nd W.E. Steadman Gran Prix
3rd Downeast Cross II
3rd Bay State Cyclocross

5th National Cyclo-cross Championships
6th Overall La Vuelta de Bisbee
6th Overall Crank Brothers US Gran Prix of Cyclocross

2nd Xilinx Cup
3rd Stumptown Cup

2007
1st Wissahickon Cross
2nd Granogue Cross
3rd Boulder Cup
3rd Whitmore's Supercross Cup II
3rd Cross Vegas
4th Overall Crank Brothers U.S. Gran Prix of Cyclocross

1st Derby City Cup I
3rd Derby City Cup II
3rd Mercer Cup II

5th Overall Verge New England Cyclocross Championships Series

1st Gran Prix of Gloucester I
1st Bay State Cyclocross
1st Caster's Cyclocross

2008
1st Toronto International Cyclocross I
1st Wissahickon Cross
1st Harbin Park International Cyclocross
1st Java Johnny's Lionheart's International
1st Cyclo-Stampede
2nd Toronto International Cyclocross II
2nd Granogue Cross
U.S. Gran Prix of Cyclocross

2nd Portland Cup I
3rd Derby City Cup I
3rd Derby City Cup II
3rd Mercer Cup II

4th Overall North American Cyclocross Trophy

1st Star Crossed
2nd Whitmore's Super Cross Cup I
3rd Rad Racing

2009
1st Overall USA Cycling Cyclocross Rankings
1st Paris-Ancaster
1st Harbin Park International Cyclocross
1st Lionheart's International
1st Cyclo-Stampede
2nd Overall North American Cyclocross Trophy

1st Toronto International Cyclocross II
2nd Star Crossed
2nd Gran Prix of Gloucester I
2nd Boulder Cup I
2nd Boulder Cup I
2nd Whitmore's Super Cross Cup I
2nd Whitmore's Super Cross Cup II
3rd Gran Prix of Gloucester II

3rd Men's Pro-Am International Challenge
4th Cross Vegas
5th National Cyclo-cross Championships
U.S. Gran Prix of Cyclocross

1st Planet Bike Cup I
1st Portland Cup II
2nd Portland Cup I
3rd Derby City Cup II

Verge New England Cyclocross Championship Series

1st Cycle-Smart International I
1st Bay State Cyclocross I
1st Bay State Cyclocross II

2010
1st Overall US Gran Prix of Cyclocross

1st Planet Bike Cup I
1st Derby City Cup I
1st Portland Cup I
1st Portland Cup II
2nd Planet Bike Cup II
2nd New Belgium Cup II
3rd Derby City Cup II

1st Overall North American Cyclocross Trophy

1st Gran Prix of Gloucester I
1st Colorado Cross Classic
1st Baystate Cyclocross I
1st Baystate Cyclocross II
2nd Gran Prix of Gloucester I

1st Overall Green Mountain Stage Race
1st Java Johnny's - Lionhearts International Cyclocross
1st Bio Wheels / United Dairy Farmers Harbin Park International
3rd National Cyclo-cross Championships
3rd Dark Horse Cyclo-Stampede
2011
1st Overall US Gran Prix of Cyclocross

1st New Belgium Cup II
1st Derby City Cup I
1st Derby City Cup II
1st Deschutes Brewery Cup I
1st Deschutes Brewery Cup II
3rd Planet Bike Cup I
3rd New Belgium Cup I

1st Bio Wheels / United Dairy Farmers Harbin Park International
1st Dark Horse Cyclo-Stampede
1st Nittany Lion Cross
1st Gateway Cross Cup
2nd Chicago Cyclocross Cup New Year's Resolution I
2nd Chicago Cyclocross Cup New Year's Resolution II
3rd Java Johnny's – Lionhearts International Cyclocross
4th Cross Vegas
10th Cyklokros Plzeň
NEProCX

1st Gran Prix of Gloucester II
2nd Catamount Grand Prix
2nd Gran Prix of Gloucester I

2012
1st National Cyclo-cross Championships
1st Nittany Lion Cross
1st CrossVegas
1st Providence Cyclocross Festival
1st Cycle-Smart International, Day 1
1st Cycle-Smart International, Day 2
1st Bay State Cyclocross, Day 2
7th Cyklokros Tábor
US Gran Prix of Cyclocross

1st Planet Bike Cup
1st SmartWool Cup p/b FC Bikes I
1st SmartWool Cup p/b FC Bikes II
1st Derby City Cup, Day 1
1st Derby City Cup, Day 2

2013
1st New Year's Resolution, Day 1
1st StarCrossed CX
1st Trek Cyclocross Collective, Day 1
1st Gran Prix of Gloucester, Day 1
1st Gran Prix of Gloucester, Day 2
1st Providence Cyclocross Festival, Day 2
1st Victory Circle Graphix Boulder Cup
1st MudFund Derby City Cup, Day 2
1st Jingle Cross, Day 1
1st Jingle Cross, Day 2
1st BayState Cyclocross
1st North Carolina Gran Prix, Day 1
1st North Carolina Gran Prix, Day 2
2014
1st National Cyclo-cross Championships
1st Altitude Adjustment Cross Day
1st Kick it Cross
1st US Open of Cyclocross
1st Victory Circle Graphix Boulder Cup
1st Trek Cyclocross Collective Cup, Day 1
1st Trek Cyclocross Collective Cup, Day 2
1st Rapha Super Cross Gloucester, Day 1
1st Rapha Super Cross Gloucester, Day 2
1st KMC Cyclocross Festival, Day 2
1st Full Moon Vista Cyclocross, Day 1
1st Cincy3 King CX After Dark
1st Jingle Cross, Day 2
9th Cauberg Cyclo-cross
2015
1st Pan-American Cyclo-cross Championships
1st National Cyclo-cross Championships
1st Gran Prix of Gloucester, Day 1
1st Gran Prix of Gloucester, Day 2
2016
1st National Cyclo-cross Championships
2nd Pan-American Cyclo-cross Championships
2017
2nd Charm City Cross
2nd Gran Prix of Gloucester, Day 2
3rd Gran Prix of Gloucester, Day 1
2018
2nd National Cyclo-cross Championships
