= La Ruta de los Conquistadores =

La Ruta de los Conquistadores ("The Conquistadors' Trail" in English), known as the first mountain bike race of its kind, is a multi-stage race held in Costa Rica. La Ruta de los Conquistadores consists of crossing Costa Rica from the Pacific to the Atlantic Coast over the course of three days. It is an individual race, covering approximately 400 kilometers (250 miles) of terrain. First staged in 1992, the three-day race tests athletes with its 8000 (approx.) meters of elevation gain and strong climate changes. The event is also open to amateurs, having a 12-hour window to finish each stage. If competitors do not finish a stage, they are still welcome to race the next day, but their cumulative times will not count on the overall results. Kevin Vermaerke, founder of the Cape Epic event in South Africa, took inspiration from La Ruta de los Conquistadores.

== Origins ==
La Ruta de los Conquistadores, also widely known simply as La Ruta, was born in an effort to call the attention of the media, both nationally (in Costa Rica) and internationally, to the importance of the conservation of the flora and fauna of the country. La Ruta began as an ecological expedition following the paths of the Spanish conquistadors Juan de Cavallón y Arboleda, Pedro Afán de Ribera, and Juan Vázquez de Coronado during their expeditions around 1653–1660.

The actual race was started in 1993 by Román Urbina, a renowned athlete and adventurer, also nominee for the mountain bike hall of fame for his work with La Ruta. Along with some friends, Urbina decided to follow the steps of the Spanish conquistadors on his mountain bike for fun, realized how great of an event it could be, and turned it into an international event since its first edition.

== Route ==
The route traverses Costa Rica in three days, from the west coast town of Jacó to Bonita beach in the Caribbean Coast. The complete trajectory is of approximately 400 kilometers, although it varies slightly each year. It follows the footsteps of the Conquistadors crossing rivers, valleys and climbing mountains. The highest point of elevation in the three-day course is the Irazú Volcano, at 3,300 metres (10,800 ft).

The race has a three-day point-to-point format, which means each racer must make it from start to finish in a certain amount of time. There are four check points per day, and these also serve as aid stations, located every 25 kilometres (16 mi) through the race course. There is a time limit for reaching each aid station, such that if a racer does not make it in time to that certain aid station he or she will be picked up by a rescue truck and taken to the finish line.

In 2015, the route which took riders up and over Irazú and Turrialba volcanoes was diverted, with organizers citing too much volcanic activity as the reason.

== Race concept ==
=== Individual ===
La Ruta de los Conquistadores is an individual point-to-point mountain bike multi-stage race. Racers may wear matching jerseys for camaraderie or support, but at the end of the day each racer will be judged individually by their time in each one of the stages.

=== Categories ===
There are eight categories in La Ruta de los Conquistadores:

- Female (all women regardless of their age)
- Open: 18–29 years old
- 30–39 years old
- 40–49 years old
- 50+ years
- Federated Racers
- Non-federated racers
- Fat Bike

The Federated Racers are those who have a UCI license or are officially federated by the Federación Costarricense de Ciclismo (the Costa Rican Cycling Federation). Pro Riders tend to be in the Open category while being federated.

== Rescue truck ==
If a racer does not finish a day's stage in the amount of time given, they will be picked up by a rescue truck and will be taken to the finish line of that particular day. They are welcome to ride the next day's stage but their cumulative times will not enter in the overall results.

== Aid ==
The first fifty riders cannot receive any type of aid outside of the aid stations, situated every 25 kilometers. The rest of the riders can receive aid from support teams, and even stop at small businesses and get refreshments or whatever they need.

== Stages ==
=== Stage 1: Juan de Cavallón ===
Day one of La Ruta de los Conquistadores is named after Juan de Cavallón, a very important conquistador in Costa Rica.

This stage begins on the Pacific Coast in the beach of Jacó, located in the province of Puntarenas and ends in Hacienda El Rodeo in the province of San José (Costa Rica's capital). During this stage competitors ride 110 kilometers (68 miles) approximately. The elevation gain of day one is of 3,400 meters (11,200 feet) approx. The altitude change riders experience is from 12 metres (39 ft) above sea level, to 650 metres (2,130 ft) above sea level, to 1201 meters sea level, to 490 metres (1,610 ft) above sea level, finishing at 855 metres (2,805 ft) above sea level. The climate during day one of La Ruta is Tropical Dry, ranging from 30–35 °C (86–95 °F).

La Ruta's day one starts at 6:00 am and gives competitors until 5:30 pm (11.5 hours) to complete the 110 km route before being picked up by the rescue truck and disqualified from the overall results. From sea level, riders climb numerous hills that hit riders with a total elevation gain of approximately 12,000+ feet. That's why Day 1 is known by competitors as the "make it or break it day". Riders must expect all kinds of riding conditions this day: mud, gravel, asphalt, and loose rocks. Temperatures will be very high in the lowlands, as high as 40 °C (104 °F) and cooler in the mountains.

- Stage starts at 6:00am
- Finish line closes up at 5:45pm

=== Stage 2: Perafán de Ribera ===
The second day of La Ruta de los Conquistadores begins in Tres Ríos, located in the province of Cartago and ends in Turrialba, also located in Cartago. During this stage competitors ride 79 kilometers (49 miles) approximately. The elevation gain of day two is of about 2,500 meters (8,200 feet). The altitude change is 1,291 metres (4,236 ft) over sea level, to 3,025 metres (9,925 ft) over sea level, to 607 metres (1,991 ft) over sea level. The climate during the Perafán de Ribera stage consists mostly of wind and rain, with a temperature range of 5–8 °C (41–46 °F), and drastic climate changes. Hypothermia is usually a problem during this stage. The terrain is 20% pavement, 20% volcanic rocks and ash, 30% steep uphill and 30% technical downhill.

Day 2 also starts at the crack of dawn and racers have until 5pm to finish. The 79 kilometres (49 mi) feature a fearsome climb of about 6,000 feet, from Tres Ríos straight up the Irazú Volcano, with the high probability of bitterly cold weather much of the day. Starting at 1,291 metres (4,236 ft) above sea level, the ride is a continuous ascent until competitors reach 3,025 metres (9,925 ft). Then it levels off, passes the Turrialba Volcano, and starts a long downhill section in Costa Rica, finishing in the town of Turrialba at an elevation of 607 metres (1,991 ft). On this day, it is very important to have well-functioning brakes and be prepared for cold weather riding. At 10,000 feet (3,000 m) with wind and rain, hypothermia is a risk, as it can get near freezing.

- Stage starts at 6:00am
- Finish line closes up at 5:45pm

=== Stage 3: Cristóbal Colón ===
The third day of La Ruta de los Conquistadores begins in Turrialba, Cartago and ends in Playa Bonita ("Pretty Beach" in English) in the province of Limón. On this stage, riders cover a distance of 120 km (75 mi) approximately. The elevation gain of this stage is of 800 meters (2,600 feet) approximately. Riders go through and altitude change of 618 metres (2,028 ft) over sea level, to 845 metres (2,772 ft) above sea level, down to sea level. The climate during the Cristobal Colón stage is Tropical Wet, which means it will be hot and humid, with a temperature of 35 °C (95 °F) and up. The terrain consists of 35% paved roads and 65% gravel roads and train tracks.

Stage 3 goes through a series of climbs and down hills for a total elevation gain of about 2700 feet, mostly during the first half of the ride. The last half is mainly flat. Despite the relatively small amount of climbing, this is a hard, long 120 km, frequently with hot coastal temperatures, scattered showers, tropical vegetation and very long, flat straightaways.

- Stage starts at 7:00am
- Finish line closes at 5:45pm

== Organization ==
La Ruta de los Conquistadores' organization consists of four full-time employees, and 3 part-time employees during 10 months of the year. During the month before La Ruta, and during the three days of the race itself, there are more than 100 people employed.

== Logistics ==
Each year, La Ruta de los Conquistadores is planned at the end of the last one. It takes a whole year to get the logistics in check. With 500 riders moving from town to town, the organization has to take into account the food and water provided to them, as well as their comfort and safety.

At the end of each day, riders arrive to the finish line where they find all the amenities they might need. There is a buffet for lunch that includes every food group so competitors can choose what exactly they need after a long day of racing. There are men and women showers, and a bicycle wash area. A mechanical tent for any bike related troubles is put up as well. A massage area is also available. There is also medical care at each of the finish lines. The services included to all racers are the lunch buffet, the showers and the bicycle wash. Extra charge is added for the mechanical revision and the massage.

=== Medics ===
La Ruta de los Conquistadores racers are covered by a basic insurance from the INS (Instituto Nacional de Seguros), which is the National Insurance Company in Costa Rica. Also, the organization of La Ruta de los Conquistadores requires riders to be covered by a personal insurance.

During the race, the National Red Cross is in charge of the medical coverage. An ambulance and a motorcycle are situated at each of the finish lines, in case of any accidents during the course of a stage, the ambulance will go and pick up the injured competitor.

=== Environmental conscience ===
La Ruta de los Conquistadores is an eco-friendly race. The organization is highly conscious of the environmental impact 500 competitors over three days can make. This is the reason why if a competitor is seen disposing of garbage somewhere that isn't marked for garbage disposal, he or she will be disqualified.

La Ruta de los Conquistadores uses biodiesel in all of their trucks. Bio-degradable detergents and oils are used in the bicycle wash and mechanic tents. Residues are separated and taken to the recycling plant.

== Prizes ==
La Ruta de los Conquistadores has prize money for the elite and women category finishers, the amount of money varies each year. For the elite and women finishers, along with the winners of each category, there are varied prizes in cycling products such as rims, helmets, etc.

== Charities ==
La Ruta de los Conquistadores works mainly with the Alcci (Asociación Lucha Contra el Cáncer Infantil, or "Association for the Fight against Children's Cancer" in English). Alcci works to raise funds for children's cancer research.

La Ruta gives a percentage of the inscription money to the foundation, which varies every year. La Ruta and Alcci have been working together since 2009.

== Media ==
La Ruta de los Conquistadores is very well placed as a strong sporting event in Costa Rica, with media coverage in the main television stations and the main newspapers. This coverage follows each stage of the race and usually gets the first page of the country's most important newspaper, La Nación.

Internationally, La Ruta de los Conquistadores has been featured in more than 150 magazines during its 21 years of existence. Some of the magazines that have covered La Ruta are Bike Magazine, VeloNews, Bike Action and Time (magazine).

Year	Winner	Number of racers
1993	David Fonseca	17
1994	Rodrigo Montoya	30
1995	Rodrigo Montoya	40
1996	Jaime Rodriguez	50
1997	Federico Ramirez	123
1998	Federico Ramirez	170
1999	Edgar Zumbado	180
2000	Edgar Zumbado	201
2001	Jose Adrian Bonilla	275
2002	Federico Ramirez	400
2003	Marvin Campos	300
2004	Paolo Montoya	300
2005	Tomas Frischknect	500
2006	Leonardo Paez	600
2007	Federico Ramirez	400
2008	Federico Ramirez	250
2009	Manuel Prado	220
2010	Benjamin Sonntag	200
2011	Todd Wells	250
2012	Paolo Montoya	500
2013	Marconi Durán	500
2014	Luis Leao Pinto	500
2015	Luis Mejía	600
2016	Luis Mejía	327
2017	Josep Betalú	551
2018	Josep Betalú	400
2019	Josep Betalú	450
2020	Postponed to 2021	
