= Todd Wells =

American cyclist

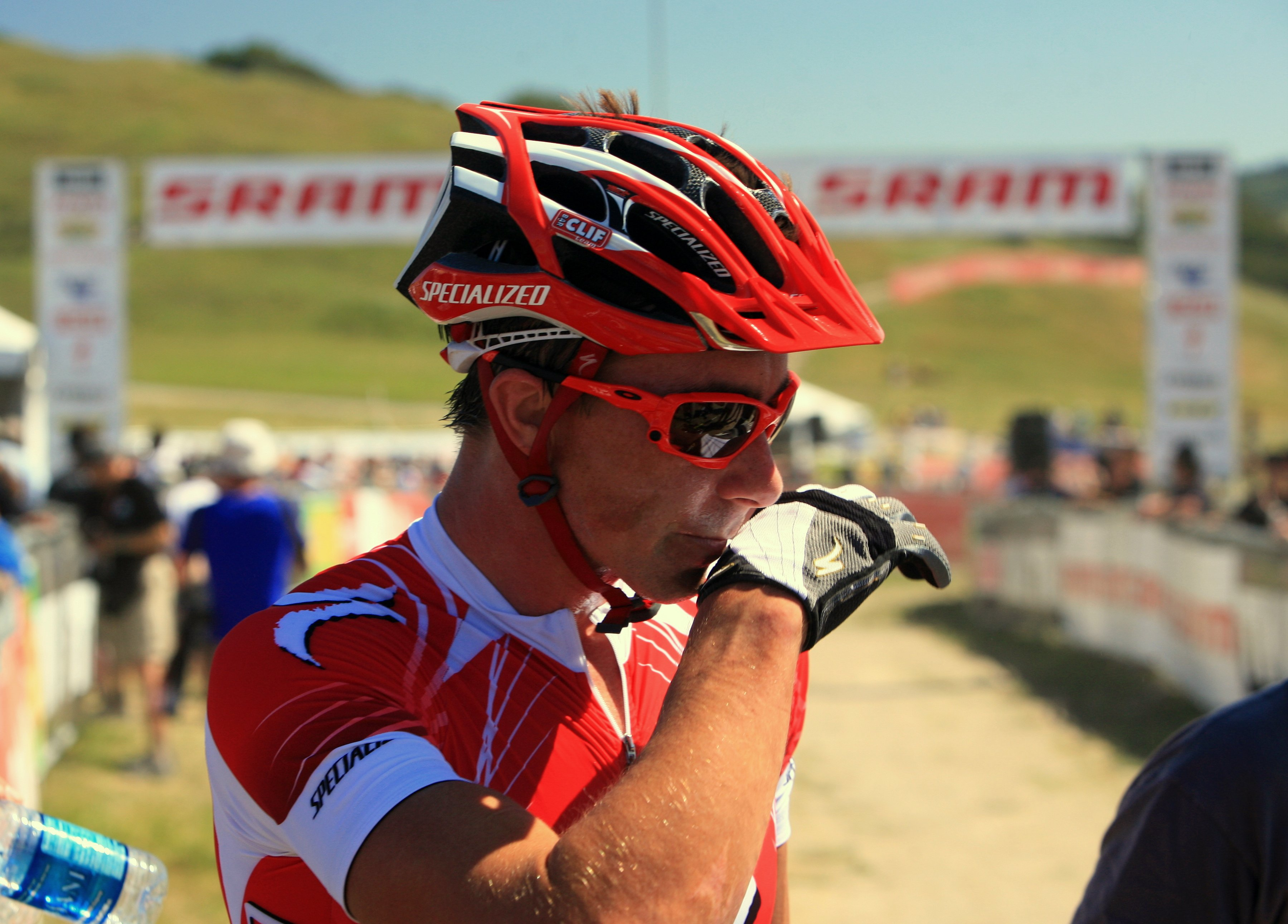
- Wells after winning the Elite Men's Short Track race at the 2009 Sea Otter Classic

Personal information
- Full name: Todd Wells
- Born: 25 December 1975 (age 50) Kingston, New York, United States
- Height: 6 ft 2 in (188 cm)
- Weight: 175 lb (79 kg)

Cycling career
- Sport: Cycling
- Current team: SRAM/TLD/Scott
- Disciplines: Cyclo-cross and mountain bike
- Role: Rider
- Rider type: Mountain Bike

Amateur team

Professional team
- 17 years: Specialized/Mountain Dew Mongoose/Hyundai GT Specialized Racing SRAM/TLD/Scott

Todd Wells is a professional cyclist specializing in mountain bike racing and cyclo-cross from the United States. Todd resides in Durango, Colorado and Tucson, Arizona. Wells races for the SRAM/TLD Factory Racing team for mountain bike racing.

In cyclo-cross, Wells captured the 2001, 2005 and 2010 USA Cycling Cyclocross National Championships.

In mountain bike Wells is a 12 time National Champion in XC, STXC and Marathon. He is a 3x Leadville Trail 100 winner, 3x Pan Am Champion as well as winner of La Ruta de los Conquistadores

== Major results ==
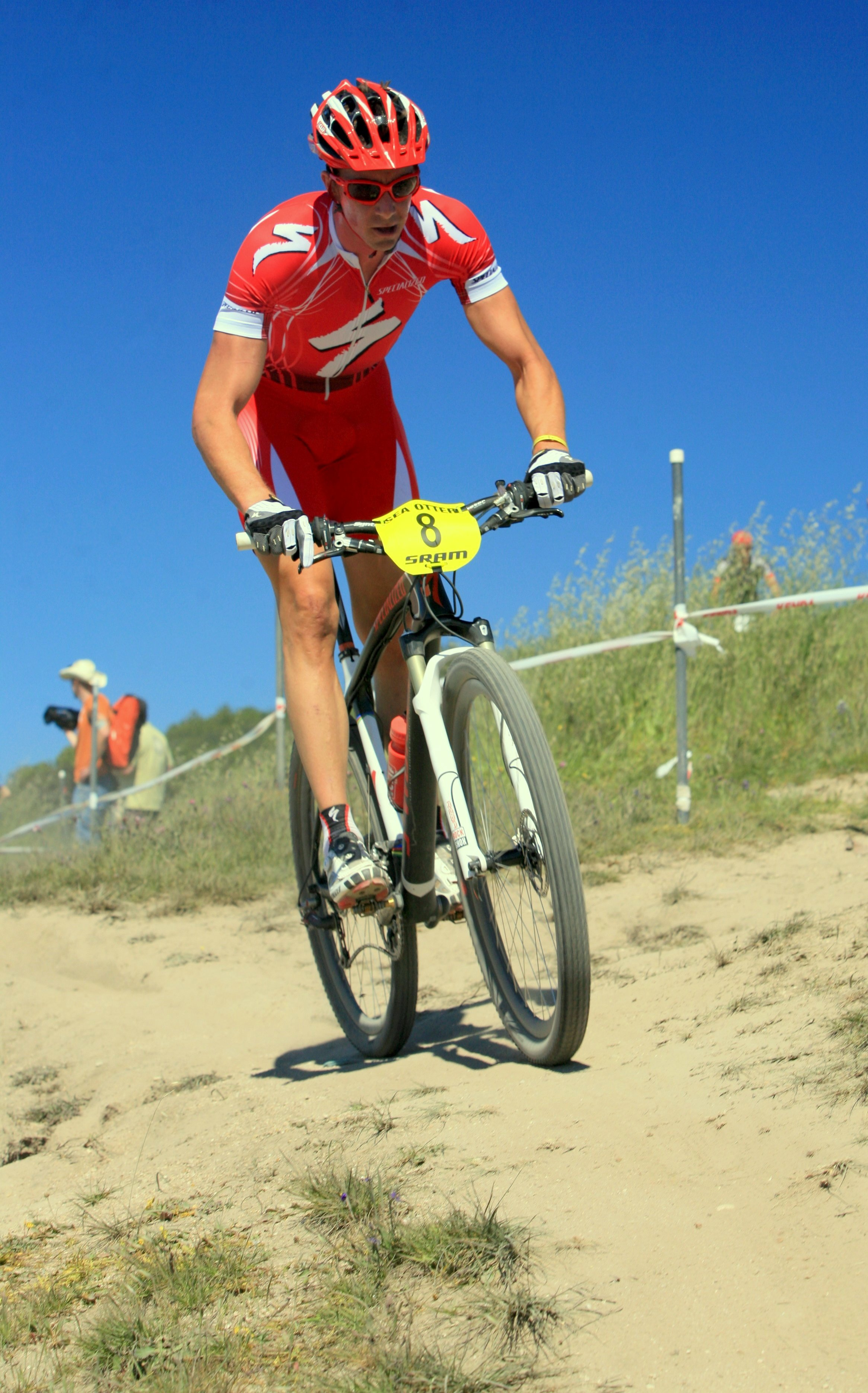
Todd Wells on his way to winning the Elite Men's Short Track race at the 2009 Sea Otter Classic in Laguna Seca, CA.

2018

- 1st, Telluride 100 Mtn. Bike Race

2016

*1st, USA Cycling Marathon National Championship

- 1st Leadville Trail 100
- 1st, Sea Otter Classic XC
- 1st Whiskey 50 Fat Tire Crit
- 1st Grand Junction Off Road Marathon and Fat Tire Crit
- 1st Blitz to the Barrel
- 3rd Carson City Off Road Marathon
- Overall Winner Epic Rides Series

2nd, National Short Track Mountain Bike Championships

- 1st Breck Epic Stage 2
- 1st Breck Epic Stage 4
- 1st Breck Epic Stage Rac;e Overall
- 1st Gesta Heroica MX

2015

*1st, USA Cycling Marathon National Championship

- 1st, Fontana PROXCT STXC
- 2nd, Bonelli #2 PROXCT STXC
- 2nd, Sea Otter Classic STXC

2014

*1st, USA Cycling Cross Country National Championship *1st, USA Cycling Marathon National Championship

- 2nd, USA Cycling Short Track National Championship
- PROXCT Overall Champion
- 1st, Leadville Trail 100
- 1st, Colorado Springs PROXCT XC
- 1st, Subaru Cup PROXCT XC
- 1st, Missoula PROXCT STXC
- 1st, Sea Otter Classic STXC
- 1st, La Ruta Stage 3
- 2nd, Whiskey 50

2013

*1st, USA Cycling Marathon National Championship *1st, USA Cycling Short Track National Championship

- 2nd, USA Cycling Cross Country National Championship
- 1st, PROXCT Overall Champion
- 1st, Breck Epic Stage Race Overall
- 1st, Breck Epic Stage 1
- 1st, Breck Epic Stage 2
- 1st, Breck Epic Stage 3
- 1st, Breck Epic Stage 5
- 1st, Fontana PROXCT XC
- 1st, Fontana PROXCT STXC
- 1st, Bump and Grind PROXCT XC
- 1st, Subaru Cup PROXCT XC
- 1st, Subaru Cup PROXCT STXC

2012

- Member USA Olympic Mountain Bike Team London

*1st, USA Cycling Marathon National Championship

- 1st, USA Cycling Short Track National Championship
- 1st, Pan Am Championships

*1st, PROXCT Overall Champion

- 2nd, USA Cycling Cross Country National Championship
- 10th, London Olympic MTB
- 4th, UCI World Cup Wyndham

2011

*1st, USA Cycling Cross Country National Championship

- 2nd, USA Cycling Short Track National Championship
- 1st, Sea Otter Classic XC
- 7th, UCI Mountain Bike World Championship Switzerland
- 1st Leadville Trail 100
- 1st La Ruta de los Conquistadores
- 1st, La Ruta de los Conquistadores Stage 1

2010

* 1st, USA Cycling Cyclocross National Championships

- 1st, USA Cycling Short Track National Championships
- 1st, USA Cycling Cross Country National Championships
- 1st, Pan America Championship Guatemala
- 1st, Fontana US Cup XC

2009

- 1st, Sea Otter Classic STXC
- 1st, Sand Creek PROXCT
- 2nd, USA Cycling Short Track National Championship
- 1st, Jingle Cross UCI Cyclocross
- 1st, Jingle Cross UCI Cyclocross
- 8th, UCI Mountain Bike World Championship

2008

- Member USA Olympic Mountain Bike Team Beijing
- 5th, UCI World Cup Canberra
- 6th, UCI World Cup Andorra
- 1st, Boulder UCI Cyclocross
- 1st, West Windsor UCI Cyclocross
- 1st, Southampton UCI Cyclocross
- 1st, Jingle Cross UCI Cyclocross

2007

- 3rd, Pan American Championship Argentina
- 1st, Jingle Cross UCI Cyclocross
- 1st, Rhode Island UCI Cyclocross
- 1st, W.E. Stedman Grand Prix UCI Cyclocross
- 1st, Durango Squawker UCI Cyclocross
- 1st, Gunnison Mountaineer UCI Cyclocross
- 3rd, USA Cycling Cyclocross National Championship

2006

- 1st, Boulder UCI Cyclocross
- 1st, Ultimate Dirt Challenge Cross Country UCI

2005

* 1st, USA Cycling Cyclocross National Championships *1st, Liberty Cup Rhode Island UCI Cyclocross

- 1st, WE Stedman CO Grand Prix UCI Cyclocross
- 1st, San Francisco Cyclocross Grand Prix
- 1st, Park City Utah NORBA National MTB Short Track (STXC)
- 1st, Puerto Rico UCI MTB
- 2nd, National Championship MTB XC
- 2nd, National Championship MTB STXC
- 2nd, Tour of Connecticut Overall
- 1st, Stage 4 Tour of the Gila

2004

- Member USA Olympic Team Mountain Bike Athens
- 1st, Aspen NORBA National MTB XC
- 1st, Ultimate Dirt Challenge UCI Cross Country
- 14th, UCI MTB World Championship
- 10th, UCI Mountain Bike World Cup Calgary
- 1st, Lower Allen Classic UCI Cyclocross
- 1st, Highland Park UCI Cyclocross
- 1st, Gear Works Bay State UCI Cyclocross
- 2nd, USA Cycling Cyclocross National Championship

2003

- 1st, Brisbane UCI Cyclocross
- 1st, Wilmington UCI Cyclocross
- 1st, Gloucester UCI Cyclocross
- 1st, Bianchi San Mateo UCI Cyclocross
- 2nd, USA Cycling Cyclocross National Championship

2002

* 1st, National Championship MTB Short Track (STXC)

- 1st, Worcester UCI Cyclocross
- 1st, Portland UCI Cyclocross
- 1st, Clif Bar Grand Prix UCI Cyclocross
- 1st, Saturn UCI Cyclocross
- 1st, Salt Lake City UCI Cyclocross
- 1st, Napa Valley UCI Cyclocross

2001

- 1st, USA Cycling Cyclocross National Championships

1996

- 1st, Collegiate MTB National Championship

1995

- 1st, Collegiate MTB National Championship

Preceded by Tim Johnson	USA Cycling Cyclocross National Championships; 2001-2002	Succeeded by Jonathan Page
Preceded by Jonathan Page	USA Cycling Cyclocross National Championships; 2005-2006	Succeeded by Ryan Trebon
Preceded by Tim Johnson	USA Cycling Cyclocross National Championships; 2010-2011	Succeeded by Jeremy Powers
