= Clara Honsinger =

American cyclist (born 1997)

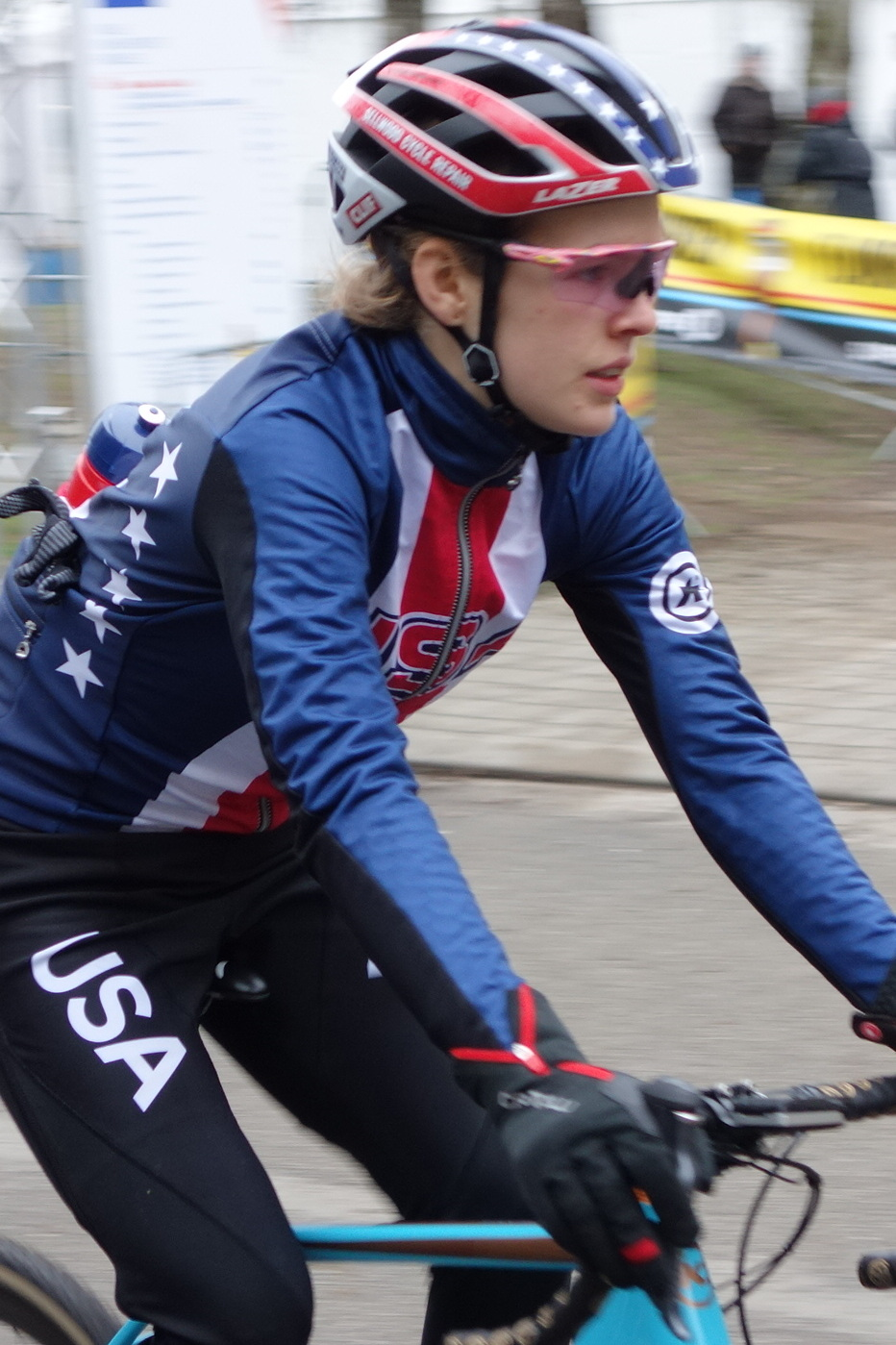
- Honsinger in 2020

Personal information
- Born: June 5, 1997 (age 29)

Cycling career
- Sport: Cycling
- Current team: EF Education–Tibco–SVB (road); Cannondale–Cyclocrossworld.com (cyclo-cross)
- Disciplines: Cyclo-cross; Road
- Role: Rider

Amateur teams
- 2013: Sappo Hill Soapworks
- 2014: Upper Echelon Fitness and Rehabilitation
- 2015: River City Bicycles
- 2015–2020: Team S+M (cyclo-cross)
- 2016: Showers Pass Elite p/b Sage Cycles
- 2019: LUX / Sideshow p/b Specialized

Professional teams
- 2020–2023: Cannondale–Cyclocrossworld.com (cyclo-cross)
- 2021–2023: Tibco–Silicon Valley Bank (road)

Major wins
- National Championships (2019, 2021)

Clara Honsinger (born June 5, 1997) is an American former professional cyclist who last rode for UCI Women's Continental Team EF Education–Tibco–SVB in road racing, and Team S&M in cyclo-cross.

== Career ==
Honsinger won the 2018 USA Cycling Cyclocross National Championship in the under-23 category held in Louisville, Kentucky. On December 15, 2019, she won the USA Cycling Cyclocross National Championship in the women's elite category. The race was held at Fort Steilacoom Park in Lakewood, Washington. She is the first new USA women's elite category Cyclocross National Champion in 15 years, following the annual victories of Katie Compton since 2004.

For the 2021 road cycling season, Honsinger joined the Tibco–Silicon Valley Bank team. She combined this with a cyclo-cross schedule, riding for the Cannondale–Cyclocrossworld.com team.

On January 31, 2021, at the élite women's world championship race in Ostend, Belgium, Honsinger placed fourth, 52 seconds behind winner Lucinda Brand of the Netherlands and 33 seconds behind third-placed Denise Betsema, also of the Netherlands.

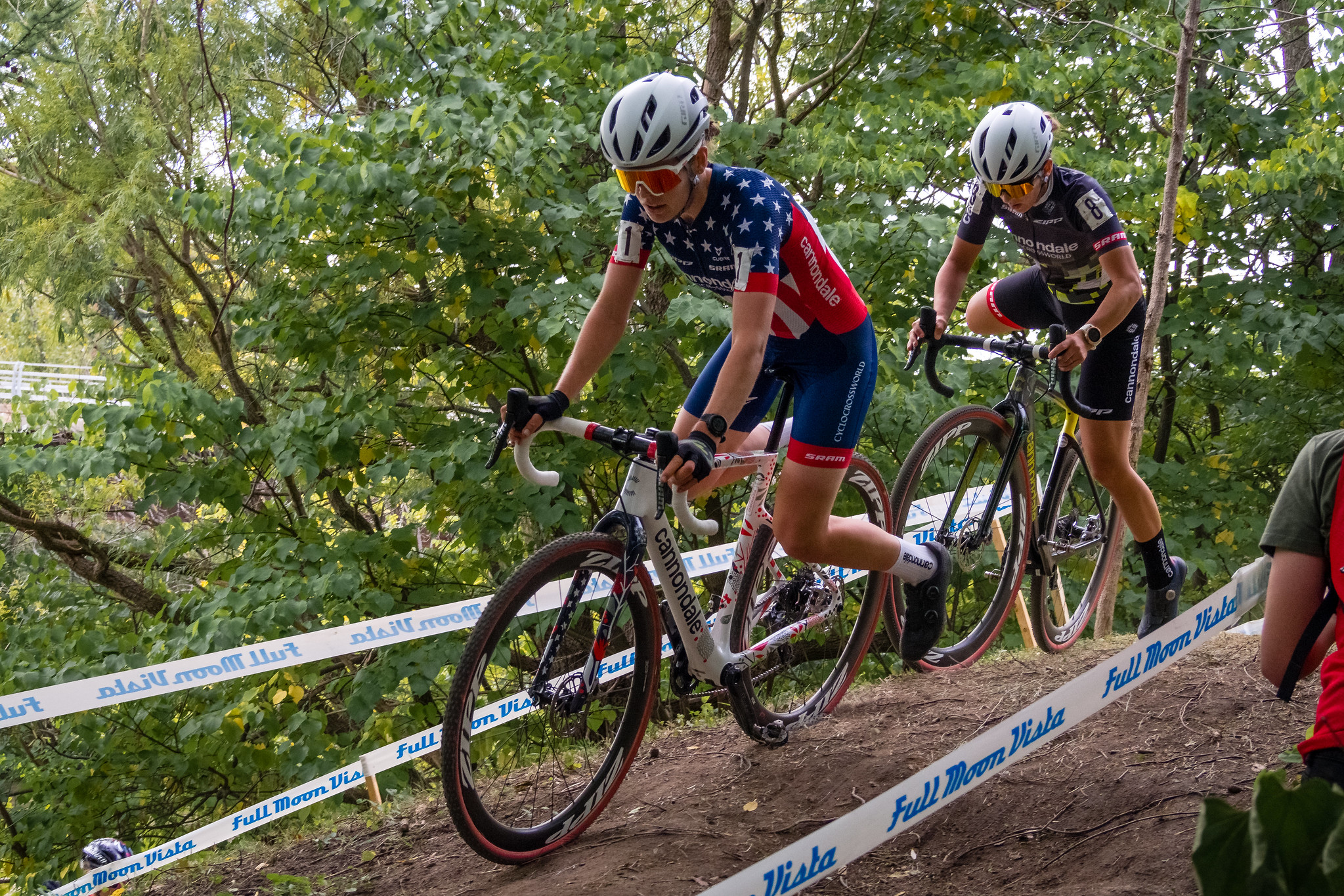
Honsinger at Rochester Cyclocross

Honsinger retired after the 2023-2024 cyclocross season.

== Personal life ==
Honsinger lives in Corvallis, Oregon, and is a student at Oregon State University.

== Major results ==
=== Cyclo-cross ===
2017–2018
2nd Pan American Under-23 Championships
2nd National Under-23 Championships
2nd Iowa City
2018–2019
1st Pan American Under-23 Championships
1st National Under-23 Championships
US Open

1st Day 1
1st Day 2

2019–2020
1st National Championships
Major Taylor Cross Cup

1st Day 1
1st Day 2

US Open

1st Day 2
2nd Day 1

1st Fayetteville
2nd Pan American Championships
UCI World Cup

3rd Iowa City

2020–2021
UCI World Cup

2nd Namur
2nd Dendermonde

2021–2022
1st National Championships
X²O Badkamers Trophy

1st Koppenberg

USCX Series

1st Baltimore I
2nd Rochester I
2nd Baltimore II
2nd Rochester II

UCI World Cup

2nd Dendermonde
3rd Fayetteville

2022–2023
Coupe de France

1st Nommay I
1st Nommay II

1st Waterloo
2023–2024
Exact Cross

3rd Zonnebeke
