= Tim Johnson (cyclist) =

American professional racing cyclist

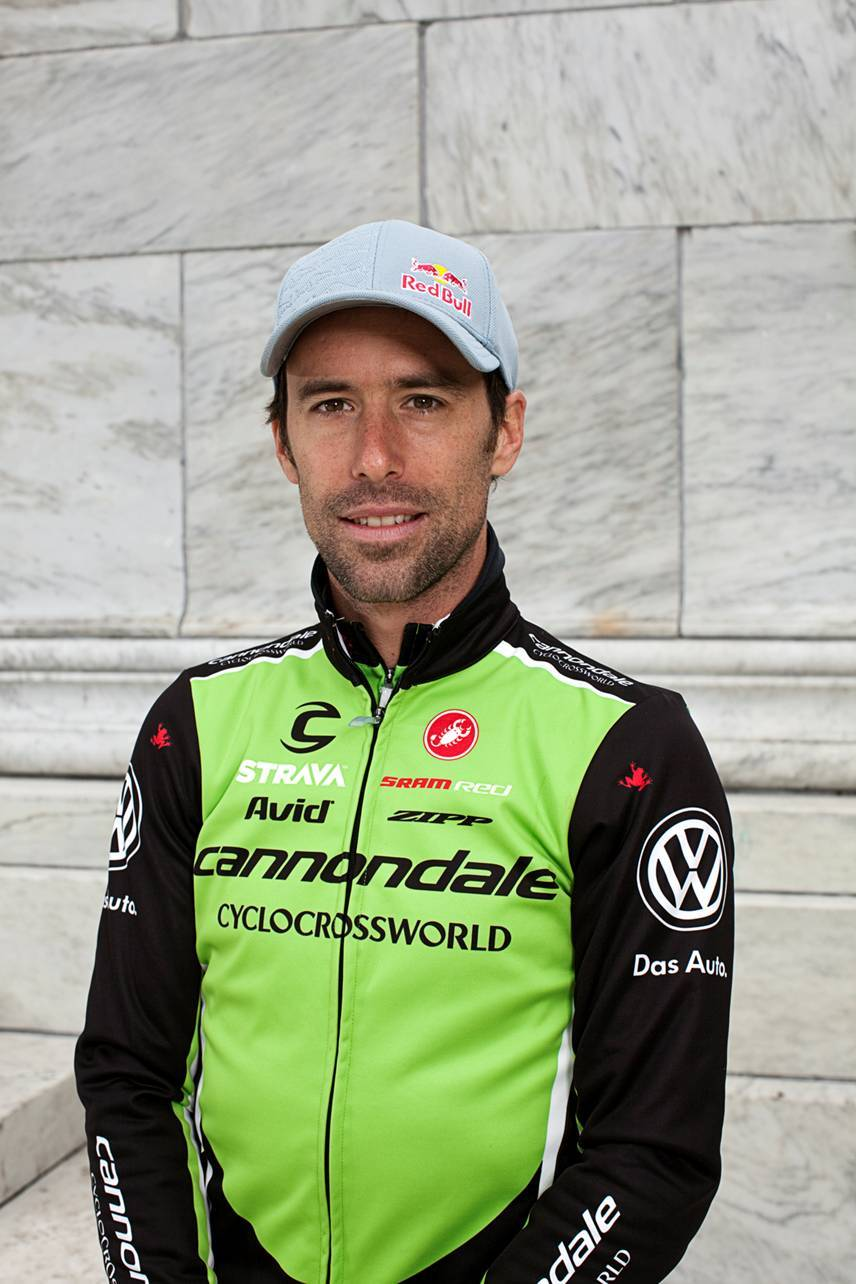

Personal information
- Full name: Timothy Johnson
- Born: August 5, 1977 (age 49) United States
- Height: 1.75 m (5 ft 9 in)
- Weight: 68 kg (150 lb)

Cycling career
- Sport: Cycling
- Current team: UnitedHealthcare–Maxxis (Road); CCW (Cyclocross)
- Disciplines: Cyclocross, road bike racing
- Role: Rider, Captain

Professional teams
- 1995–2000: CCB Volkswagen (Road/Cyclocross)
- 2001–2003: Saturn (Road/Cyclocross)
- 2004: Saunier Duval–Prodir (Road)
- 2005: Jittery Joes/Kalahari (Road)
- 2005: CCW (Cyclocross)
- 2006–2008: HNM (Road)
- 2006: CCW (Cyclocross)
- 2007: CCW (Cyclocross)
- 2009: UHC (Road)

Major wins
- 1 – 1st, USA CCNC: 2009, 2007, 2001; 1st Overall, US Gran Prix of Cyclocross, 2008 1st Overall, North American Cyclocross Trophy, 2009
Medal record
Representing the United States
Men's cyclocross
World Championships
Bronze medal – third place	1999 Poprad	Espoir Race

Timothy Johnson (born August 5, 1977, in Middleton, Massachusetts) is an American professional racing cyclist who has found success in cyclocross and road bicycle racing, and is one of only five male riders (Jonathan Page was 2nd at worlds in 2007 and Matt Kelly was 1st at worlds in 1999 along with Danny Summerhill and Walker Ferguson) from the United States to stand on a UCI Cyclocross World Championships podium. Johnson has six career national championships – three Elite, two Espoir and one Junior – and a bronze medal from the UCI Cyclocross World Championships that he won in 1999 in Poprad, Slovakia. Johnson spent his 2009 road season riding for the Ouch presented by Maxxis team, of which he is the Road Captain. For 2010, Johnson rode for UnitedHealthcare Pro Cycling Team presented by Maxxis. Johnson is divorced of fellow professional cyclist Lyne Bessette. In June 2018 Tim was named the director for development for the USA Cycling Foundation.

== Major accomplishments ==
Johnson was arguably 2009's most successful American Cyclocross rider, winning 11 races, including the US Cyclocross National Championships in Bend, Oregon. In 2009, Johnson was first in the North American Cyclocross Trophy overall standings and second in the US Gran Prix of Cyclocross overall standings. Johnson missed the first five major UCI races of the season, including the first weekend of the US Gran Prix of Cyclocross, due to a separated shoulder he suffered at Star Crossed in Redmond, Washington.

Johnson finally won the coveted US Gran Prix of Cyclocross overall title in 2008, wearing the Cyclocross National Champion jersey, winning three of the series' six races. Johnson missed time late in the season due to a knee injury, but still managed to finish second in the North American Cyclocross Trophy overall standings, despite missing two of the series' eight races.

In 2007, Johnson captured his second U.S. national cyclocross championship repeating his 2000 success. Video production company DH Productions produced a documentary about Johnson's 2007–2008 season, following his success from early season success through his National Championships victory and his subsequent trip to the UCI World Championships in Treviso, Italy. The film was titled the 9 Ball Diaries, paying homage to the design of Johnson's Cannondale/Leer/Cyclocrossworld.com team jersey and Cannondale's Cyclocross bicycle.

In 2006, Johnson finished the season without landing outside the top-4 in any Cyclocross race entered. As a co-captain of the Health Net Professional Cycling Team he helped the team achieve its 3rd consecutive #1 NRC Ranking.

In 2005, Johnson edged two-time defending champion Mark McCormack to win the New England Championship Cyclo-Cross Series title and finished second overall in the United States Gran Prix of Cyclocross series after leading the Overall.

In 2003, Johnson won two stages and the overall title at the Herald Sun Tour, a road bicycle racing stage race held in Australia. Johnson won the tour's ninth stage from Horsham to Mount William. Two days later, Johnson won the tour's twelfth stage, a criterium in Echuca. The following day, Johnson finished second on the tour's thirteenth and final stage, taking a narrow 33 second victory over Australia's Luke Roberts.

== Championships ==
Johnson has won United States Cyclocross National Championships on six occasions. Johnson won his first as a Junior rider in 1995 in Leicester, Mass Johnson won his first of his U23 Cyclocross National Championships in 1998 in Fort Devens, Massachusetts and won his second the next year in 1999 in Presido, California. In 2000, Johnson was on the top step of the podium for the third year in a row, this year as an Elite rider, winning his first Elite title in Kansas City, Kansas. It was not until 2007 that Johnson found himself back in the Stars and Stripes jersey, winning the 2007 National Championship, again in Kansas City, Kansas. Johnson again won in 2009, taking his third Elite National Title, this time in Bend, Oregon.

After winning the Espoir's National Title in 1999, Johnson went on to the UCI Cyclocross World Championships in Poprad, Slovakia, where he rode his way to a third-place finish. Johnson's bronze medal was the first time a cyclocross rider from the United States had stood on the podium at the UCI Cyclocross World Championships, coming just one day before a surprising victory by U.S. rider Matt Kelly in the junior's event. Johnson had finished 10th at the World Championships in 1998 when they were held in Middelfart, Denmark

== Palmares ==
1995

- (Junior) United States Cyclo-cross National Champion – Leicester, Massachusetts

1998

- (U23) United States Cyclo-cross National Champion – Fort Devens, Massachusetts
- (U23) 10th Cyclocross World Championships Middelfart, Denmark

1999

- (U23) United States Cyclo-cross National Champion – Presido, California
- (U23) 3rd Cyclocross World Championships Poprad, Slovakia

2000

- United States Cyclocross National Champion – Kansas City, Kansas
- 1st Mount Washington Hill Climb
- 1st Sterling Road Race
- 1st Harvard Road Race

2001 – Saturn

- 1st KOM, Tour of Willamette
- 1st Mount Washington Hill Climb
- 1st Cherry Blossom Classic
- 1st Amherst International Cyclo-cross
- 1st Chicago SuperCup Cyclocross

2002 – Saturn

- 13th Cyclocross World Championships Zolder, Belgium
- 13th Wetzikon World Cup Switzerland
- 2nd Cyclocross National Championships Baltimore
- SuperCup
  - 2nd SuperCup #1 – Chicago
  - 2nd SuperCup #2 – Boston
  - 4th SuperCup #3 – Baltimore
- 1st Chameleon Cross
- 1st KOM, Tour of Slovenia
- 2nd ECV Cyclocross Gloucester, Massachusetts
- 2nd Granogue Cyclocross Wilmington, Delaware
- 3rd La Classique Montreal-Quebec
- 3rd Amherst Cyclocross Northampton, Massachusetts

2003 – Saturn

- 1st Overall – Herald Sun Tour
  - 1st Stage #9 – Mount William, Australia
  - 1st Stage #12 – Echuca, Australia
  - 2nd Stage #13 – Buningyong, Australia
  - 3rd Stage #8 – Horsham, Australia
  - 7th Stage #6 – Port Fairy, Australia
- 1st Points Competition, Nature Valley Grand Prix
- 1st KOM, International Tour de 'Toona,
- 1st La Classique Montreal-Quebec
- 1st Fort Collins Grand Prix
- 1st TT Stage, Multi-Laser Grand Prix

2005 – Jittery Joe's/Kalahari and Cyclocrossworld.com/Louis Garneau

- 1st Overall, Verge New England Cyclo-cross Series (NECCS)
- 2nd Overall, Crankbrothers USGP of Cyclocross Series
  - 1st USGP #3 – Gran Prix of Gloucester #1 Gloucester, Massachusetts
  - 3rd USGP #6 – Clark Natwick GP San Francisco
  - 3rd USGP #2 – Rad Racing Gran Prix Tacoma, Washington
  - 4th USGP #4 – Gran Prix of Gloucester #2 Gloucester, Massachusetts
  - 5th USGP #5 – Surf City Cyclocross Watsonville, California
  - 5th USGP #1 – Stumptown Classic Portland, Oregon
- New England Championship Cyclo-cross Series (NECCS)
  - 1st Chainbiter 7.0 Farmington, Connecticut
  - 1st Baystate Cross Sterling, Massachusetts
  - 2nd Caster's Gran Prix Warwick, Rhode Island
  - 2nd Downeast Cyclocross New Gloucester, Maine
  - 3rd W.E. Steadman GP South Kingstown, Rhode Island
  - 3rd Cycle-Smart International Northampton, Massachusetts
- 1st Aurora Cross UCI, Canada

2006 – Cannondale/Cyclocrossworld.com

- #1 Ranked Rider National Racing Calendar Standings, USA Cycling
- 3rd California Giant Cyclocross National Championships Providence, Rhode Island
- 1st California Giant Strawberry Cup Providence, Rhode Island
- 2nd Overall, Crank Brothers USGP of Cyclocross Series
  - 1st USGP #6 – Portland, Oregon
  - 2nd USGP #5 – Tacoma, Washington
  - 2nd USGP #4 – Boulder, Colorado
  - 4th USGP #3 – Longmont, Colorado
  - 2nd USGP #2 – Gloucester, Massachusetts
  - 2nd USGP #1 – Gloucester, Massachusetts
- New England Championship Cyclo-cross Series (NECCS)
  - 1st NECCS Round #7 – Caster's Cross, Warwick, Rhode Island
  - 1st NECCS Round #6 – W.E. Stedman Grand Prix, South Kingston, Rhode Island
  - 1st NECCS Round #5 – Bay State Cyclocross, Sterling, Massachusetts
  - 1st NECCS Round #2 – Downeast Cyclocross #2, New Gloucester, Maine
  - 1st NECCS Round #1 – Downeast Cyclocross #1, New Gloucester, Maine
- 2nd Wissahickon Cross
- 4th Granogue Cross
- 1st Whitmore's Super Cross Cup #2 Southampton, New York
- 2nd Whitmore's Super Cross Cup #1 Southampton, New York
- 1st Vermont Grand Prix Burlington, Vermont

2006 – Health Net Pro Cycling Team Presented by Maxxis

- Named Best American Road Team by VeloNews

2007 – Health Net–Maxxis

- 8th Overall, Tour de Georgia

2007 – Cannondale/Leer/Cyclocrossworld

- United States Cyclocross National Champion – Kansas City, Kansas
- 2nd Overall, Crank Brothers US Gran Prix of Cyclocross
  - 1st USGP #5 – Portland Cup #1 Portland, OR
  - 1st USGP #2 – Derby City Cup #2 Louisville, Kentucky
  - 2nd USGP #6 – Portland Cup #2 Portland, OR
  - 2nd USGP #4 – Mercer Cup #2 West Windsor, New Jersey
  - 2nd USGP #1 – Derby City Cup #1 Louisville, Kentucky
  - 3rd USGP #3 – Mercer Cup #1 West Windsor, New Jersey
- New England Cyclocross Championship Series (NECCS)
  - 2nd NECCS #2 – Gran Prix of Gloucester #2 Gloucester, Massachusetts
  - 3rd NECCS #7 – NBX Gran Prix Warwick, Rhode Island
  - 3rd NECCS #5 – Baystate Cyclocross Sterling, Massachusetts
- 1st Granogue Cross Wilmington, Delaware
- 2nd Boulder Cup Boulder, Colorado
- 2nd Wissahickon Cross Ludwig's Corners, Pennsylvania
- 4th Whitmore's Super Cross Cup #2 Southampton, New York
- 4th Whitmore's Super Cross Cup #1 Southampton, New York

2008 – Cannondale/Cyclocrossworld.com

- 1st Overall, US Grand Prix of Cyclocross
  - 1st UGSP #5 – Portland Cup #1 Portland, Oregon
  - 1st USGP #3 – Mercer Cup #1 West Windsor, New Jersey
  - 1st USGP #2 – Derby City Cup #2 Louisville, Kentucky
  - 3rd USGP #6 – Portland Cup #2 Portland, Oregon
  - 6th USGP #1 – Derby City Cup #1 Louisville, Kentucky
- 2nd Overall, North American Cyclocross Trophy
  - 1st NACT #6 – Boulder Cup #2 Boulder, Colorado
  - 1st NACT #2 – Rad Racing Lakewood, Washington
  - 2nd NACT #4 – Gran Prix of Gloucester #2 Gloucester, Massachusetts
  - 2nd NACT #3 – Gran Prix of Gloucester #1 Gloucester, Massachusetts
  - 3rd NACT #5 – Boulder Cup #1 Boulder, Colorado
  - 3rd NACT #1 – Star-Crossed Redmond, Washington
- 1st Toronto International Cyclocross #2 Toronto
- 2nd Cross Vegas Las Vegas, Nevada
- 2nd Toronto International Cyclocross #1 Toronto
- 2nd Wissahickon Cross Ludwig's Corners, Pennsylvania
- 3rd Granogue Cross Wilmington, Delaware

2009 – Cannondale/Cyclocrossworld.com

- United States Cyclocross National Champion – Bend, Oregon
- 2nd Overall, US Gran Prix of Cyclocross
  - 1st USGP #6 – Mercer Cup #3 West Windsor, New Jersey
  - 1st USGP #4 – Derby City Cup #2 Louisville, Kentucky
  - 2nd USGP #5 – Mercer Cup #1 West Windsor, New Jersey
  - 3rd USGP #8 – Portland Cup #2 Portland, Oregon
  - 3rd USGP #3 – Derby City Cup #1 Louisville, Kentucky
  - 4th USGP #7 – Portland Cup #1 Portland, Oregon
- 1st Overall, North American Cyclocross Trophy
  - 1st NACT #10 – Whitmore's Super Cross Cup #2 – Southampton, New York
  - 1st NACT #9 – Whitmore's Super Cross Cup #1 – Southampton, New York
  - 1st NACT #8 – Boulder Cup Boulder, Colorado
  - 1st NACT #7 – Blue Sky Velo Cup Longmont, Colorado
  - 1st NACT #5 – Toronto International Cyclocross #1 Toronto
  - 1st NACT #4 – Gran Prix of Gloucester #2 Gloucester, Massachusetts
  - 2nd NACT #6 – Toronto International Cyclocross #2 Toronto
  - 4th NACT #3 – Gran Prix of Gloucester #1 Gloucester, Massachusetts
- New England Cyclocross Championship Series (NECCS)
  - 1st NECCS #6 – Providence Cyclocross #2 Providence, Rhode Island
  - 1st NECCS #5 – Providence Cyclocross #1 Providence, Rhode Island

Awards and achievements
Preceded by Ryan Trebon	US Cyclocross Elite Men's National Champion; 2009–2010	Succeeded by Todd Wells
Preceded by Ryan Trebon	US Cyclocross Elite Men's National Champion; 2007–2008	Succeeded by Ryan Trebon
Preceded by Mark Gullickson	US Cyclocross Elite Men's National Champion; 2000–2001	Succeeded by Todd Wells
Preceded by Tim Johnson	US Cyclocross Espoir Men's National Champion; 1999–2000	Succeeded by Ben Jacques-Maynes
Preceded by Jonathan Page	US Cyclocross Espoir Men's National Champion; 1998–1999	Succeeded by Tim Johnson
Preceded by	US Cyclocross Junior Men's National Champion; 1995–1996	Succeeded by Ryan Miller
