= Zach McDonald =

American bicycle racer (born 1991)

Personal information
- Full name: Zachary McDonald
- Born: February 13, 1991 (age 35) Bainbridge Island, Washington
- Height: 5 ft 9 in (175 cm)
- Weight: 135 lb (61 kg)

Cycling career
- Sport: Cycling
- Discipline: Cyclo-cross

Amateur teams
- 2006–2009: Classic Cycles
- 2014: KCCX Elite Cyclocross Team
- 2015: Streamline Insurance Services Cycling Team

Professional team
- 2010–2013: Rapha–Focus

Major wins
- National U23 Cyclocross Championships (2012)

Zachary McDonald (born February 13, 1991) is an American former professional cyclo-cross cyclist. In late 2008, he won the U.S. Junior National Cyclo-cross Championships, followed by a 3rd place in the junior category of the Roubaix race at the UCI World Cup in January 2009. He won the National U23 Championships in 2012, before stepping up to the professional category where he placed 2nd the following year.

== Major results ==
2006–2007
2nd National Junior Championships
2007–2008
1st National Junior Championships
2009–2010
2nd National Under-23 Championships
2011–2012
1st National Under-23 Championships
1st Providence Cyclo-cross
2012–2013
1st Providence Cyclo-cross Festival 2
2nd National Championships
2013–2014
1st Kingsport Cyclo-cross Cup
1st Tokyo Cyclocross
2014–2015
1st Resolution 'Cross Cup 1
1st Resolution 'Cross Cup 2
3rd National Championships
2015–2016
1st Rapha Nobeyama Supercross #2
