= Maureen Bruno Roy =

Personal information
- Born: 10/11/1975 Malden, MA

Cycling career
- Sport: Cycling
- Current team: Retired
- Disciplines: Cyclocross, MTB
- Role: Rider
- Rider type: Cyclocross, climbing, anything muddy

Amateur teams
- 2005-2007: Independent Fabrication
- 2008-2010: MM Racing p/b Seven Cycles

Professional team
- 2010-2015: Bob's Red Mill

Major wins
- United States National Cyclocross Championships 2013-14 Single Speed 2014-15 Single Speed United States Masters National Cyclocross Championships 2005 Masters 30-34 2007 Masters 30-34 2008 Masters 30-34

Maureen Bruno Roy is a United States cyclocross and mountain bike racer. She has competed in 2 UCI Cyclocross World Championships on the US National Team. She has been a four time US National Cyclocross champion in both the single speed and masters division, and has earned a bronze medal in the elite field. She won the Single Speed Cyclocross World Championship in Louisville KY in 2014. Bruno Roy announced her retirement from professional racing in 2015.
