= Clark Natwick =

American cyclocross cyclist

Cycling career
- Sport: Cycling
- Current team: Retired
- Discipline: Cyclocross
- Role: Rider

Clark Natwick is an American former cyclocross cyclist.

== Career ==
Natwick was the U.S. senior national cyclocross champion in 1981, 1986 and 1987. He is also the namesake for the Grand Prix Clark Natwick cyclocross race held each November in San Francisco's Golden Gate Park.

Natwick competed in several road racing events; he won the Mt. Hamilton Road Race racing with Greg LeMond.

Natwick is currently a coach in San Mateo, California.
