= Mark McCormack (cyclist) =

American cyclist

Personal information
- Born: September 15, 1970 (age 56) Plymouth, Massachusetts, U.S.

Cycling career
- Sport: Cycling
- Disciplines: Cyclo-cross, road cycling
- Role: Rider

Major wins
- 1st overall, Fitchburg Longsjo Classic (2004); 1st, CSC Invitational (2006); 2nd overall, International Tour de Toona (2005)

Mark McCormack (born September 15, 1970, Plymouth, Massachusetts) is a professional cyclo-cross and road bicycle racer from the United States. McCormack became the first rider to hold the U.S. national championship in cyclo-cross and road bicycle racing in a career.

On Monday November 12, 2012, McCormack took first place in one, if not the, first ever "fat tire" bicycle race at the Coonemesset Farms Eco-Cross in Falmouth, Massachusetts. The organizers required that all participant's bicycles had a tire width no narrower than 3.5".

== Major results ==
1997
(United States) USA Cycling Cyclocross National Championships
1999
1st, Stage 4, Tour of Denmark
1st, Stage 2, Gran Prix Cycliste de Beauce, Canada
2003
(United States) USPRO National Championships
Overall champion, Professional Cycling Tour (PCT)
2004
1st overall, Fitchburg Longsjo Classic
1st overall, Giordana Classic Criterium Series
1st overall, Green Mountain Stage Race
1st overall, Tour of Connecticut
1st, Downeast Cyclo Cross, Verge New England Championship Cyclo-cross Series
1st, Whitmores Landscaping Cyclo Cross
1st, Marblehead Circuit Race, Massachusetts
2005
1st, Chris Thater Memorial
1st overall, Tour of Connecticut
2nd overall, International Tour de Toona

1st, Stage 1
1st, Stage 5

1st, Tour of Grandview Criterium
2006
1st CSC Invitational
1st, Cox Charities Cycling Classic
1st overall, Verge New England Championship Cyclo-cross Series
2007
2nd Northampton I | C2
