= Elle Anderson =

American cyclist (born 1988)

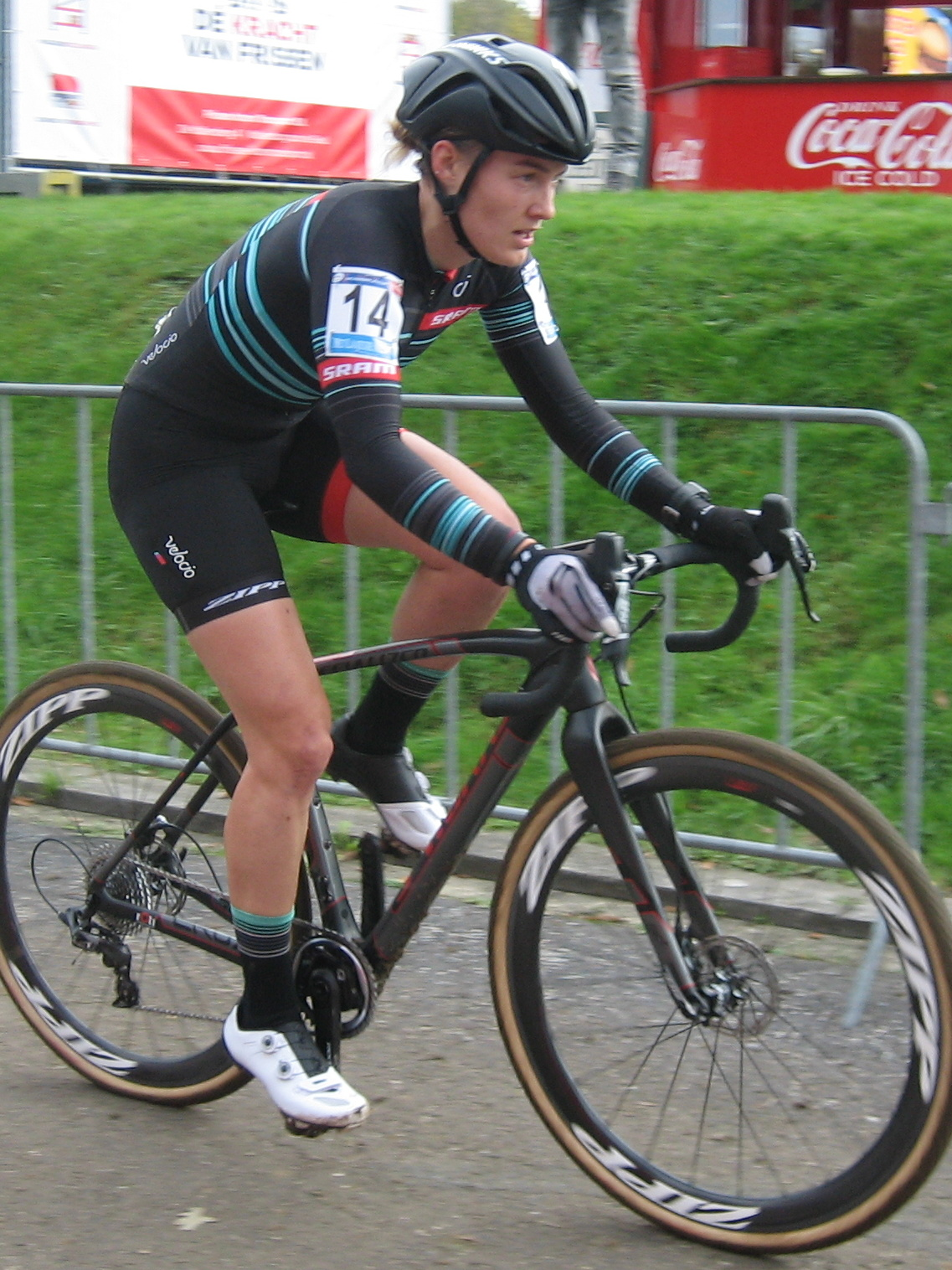
- Anderson in the 2016 Cauberg Cyclo-cross

Personal information
- Born: March 29, 1988 (age 38) Stowe, Vermont, U.S.

Cycling career
- Sport: Cycling
- Disciplines: Cyclo-cross; Road cycling
- Role: Rider

Professional team
- 2015: BMW p/b Happy Tooth Dental

Elle Anderson (born March 29, 1988) is a retired American road cyclist and cyclo-cross cyclist. She represented her nation in the women's elite event at the 2016 UCI Cyclo-cross World Championships in Heusden-Zolder.

In September 2019, Anderson announced her retirement from cyclo-cross to become the head coach for the Killington Mountain School's endurance cycling program in Vermont.
