= Ryan Trebon =

American bicycle racer (born 1981)

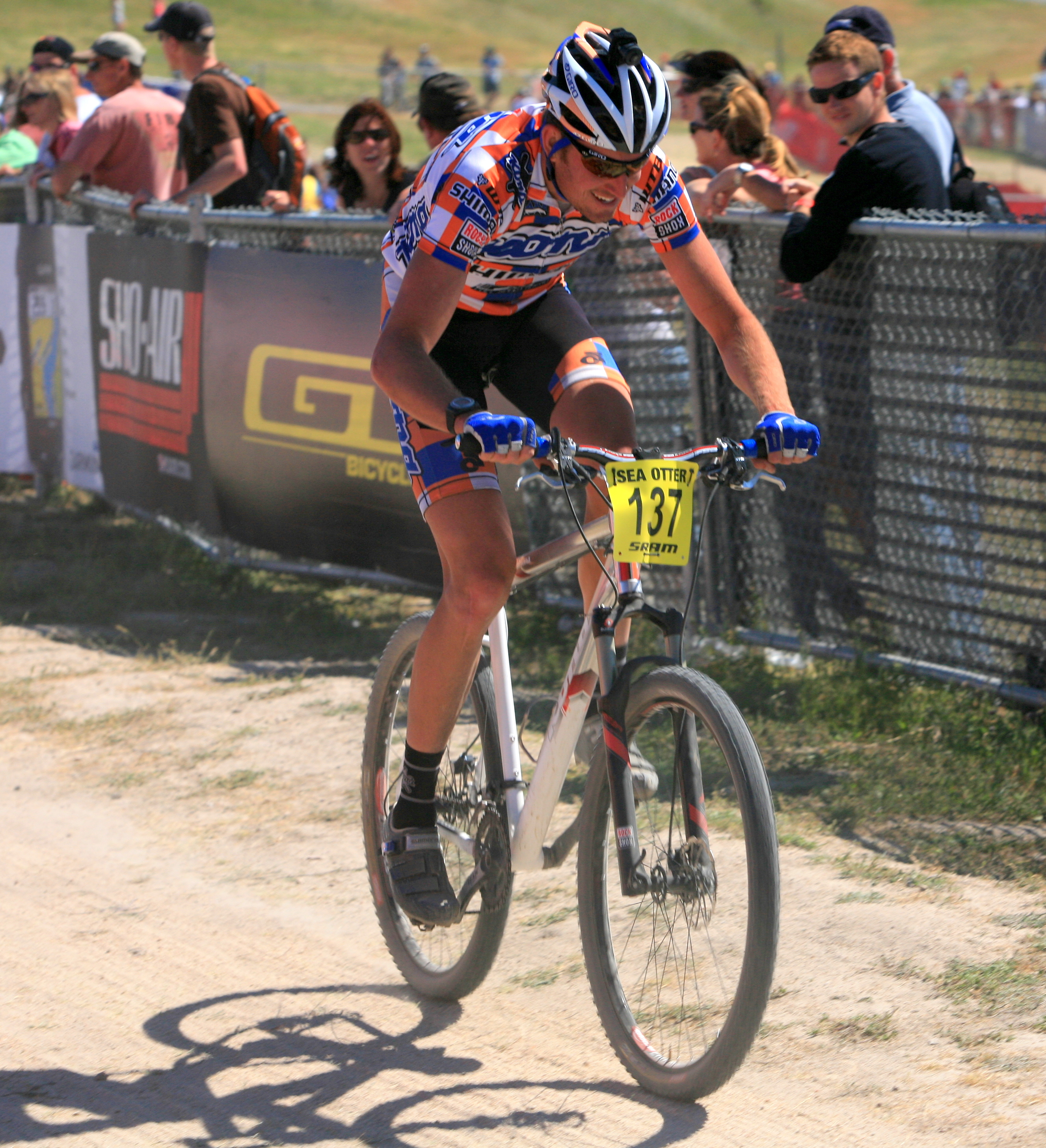
- Ryan Trebon racing for Kona at the 2009 Sea Otter Classic

Personal information
- Full name: Ryan Trebon
- Born: March 5, 1981 (age 45) United States
- Height: 1.98 m (6 ft 6 in)
- Weight: 79 kg (174 lb)

Cycling career
- Sport: Cycling
- Current team: Cannondale / CyclocrossWorld
- Disciplines: Cyclo-cross, mountain bike racing
- Role: Rider

Professional team
- 2004-: Kona/Les Gets; LTS/Felt : Cannondale Cyclocrossowrld

Major wins
- 1 - 1st, USA Cycling Cyclocross National Championships, 08 1 - 1st, USA Cycling Cyclocross National Championships, 06; 1 - 1st, USA Cycling National Cross-Country; Mountain Bike Championships, 06; 2 - 1st, Overall, U.S. Gran Prix of Cyclocross series 04, 06 2 x USA MTB national champion 2006 and 2007

Ryan Trebon (born March 5, 1981) is a retired American bicycle racer, born in Loma Linda, California. He specialized in cyclo-cross and mountain bike racing.

Trebon captured the U.S. Gran Prix of Cyclocross series championship four different times. Trebon made a name for himself with his powerful riding style, aggressive racing tactics, and remarkable endurance. Standing at 6’5” (196 cm), he was one of the tallest elite cyclo-cross racers.

== Cycling career ==
=== Cyclo-cross ===
Trebon was a key figure in American cyclo-cross during the 2000s and early 2010s. Some of his most notable achievements in the discipline include:

- 2006 U.S. National Cyclocross Champion – Winning the elite men’s title cemented his place as one of the top riders in the country.
- Multiple UCI Cyclocross Wins – Trebon competed in numerous international cyclo-cross races, regularly finishing at the top against strong competition.
- US Gran Prix of Cyclocross Champion – He took part in the domestic circuit, often battling with other top American riders such as Tim Johnson and Jeremy Powers.

=== Mountain Biking ===
In addition to cyclo-cross, Trebon was a successful cross-country mountain bike racer. His achievements in this discipline include:

- 2006 U.S. National Mountain Bike Cross-Country Champion – He became the first American male cyclist to win both the national cyclo-cross and cross-country mountain bike championships in the same year.
- Strong Performances in NORBA and National MTB Series Events – Trebon was a consistent podium finisher in mountain biking, racing against top U.S. and international riders.

=== Teams and Legacy ===
During his career, Trebon raced for several prominent teams, including:

- Kona (Kona/Les Gets, Kona-FSA)
- Cannondale-Cyclocrossworld
- LTS-Felt

His fierce rivalries with other top American cyclo-cross racers, like Tim Johnson and Jeremy Powers, helped raise the level of competition in U.S. cyclo-cross. His success also contributed to the growing popularity of the sport in North America.

=== Retirement and Influence ===
Trebon retired from professional racing in 2017, citing a desire to step away from the competitive scene. Despite retiring, he remains a respected figure in the cycling community, occasionally providing insights into the sport and mentoring younger riders.

== Major results ==
2014

- 2nd, USA Cycling Cyclocross National Championships

2012

- 2nd, USA Cycling Cyclocross National Championships

2011

- 3rd, USA Cycling National Cross-Country Mountain Bike Championships (Short Track)

2010

- 2nd, USA Cycling Cyclocross National Championships
- 3rd, USA Cycling National Cross-Country Mountain Bike Championships

2009

- 2nd, USA Cycling Cyclocross National Championships

2008

- 1st, USA Cycling Cyclocross National Championships

2006

- 1st, USA Cycling Cyclocross National Championships
- 1st, USA Cycling National Cross-Country Mountain Bike Championships
- 1st, Overall, U.S. Gran Prix of Cyclocross series
  - 1st, Whitmore's Landscaping Super Cross Cup #1, (Southampton, NY)
  - 1st, Gran Prix of Gloucester #1 (Gloucester, MA)
  - 1st, Gran Prix of Gloucester #2 (Gloucester, MA)
  - 1st, Xilinx Cup (Longmont, CO)
  - 4th, Boulder Cup (Boulder, CO)
  - 1st, Rad Racing Cup (Lakewood, WA)
  - 5th, Stumptown Cup (Portland, OR)
- 10th, Superprestige Round 5: Hamme-Zogge (Hamme, Belgium)

2005

- 4th, Overall, U.S. Gran Prix of Cyclocross series
  - 1st, Stumptown Cyclocross Classic (Portland, OR)
  - 2nd, Rad Racing GP of Cyclocross (Tacoma, WA)
  - 1st, Gran Prix of Gloucester #2 (Gloucester, MA)

2004

- 1st, Overall, U.S. Gran Prix of Cyclocross series
  - 2nd, Gran Prix of Gloucester #1 (Gloucester, MA)
  - 1st, Gran Prix of Gloucester #2 (Gloucester, MA)
  - 1st, Beacon Cyclocross (Bridgeton, NJ)
  - 1st, Highland Park Cyclocross Race (Highland Park, NJ)

2003

- 3rd, USA Cycling Cyclocross National Championships
- 1st, North Carolina State Cyclo-cross Championship
- 1st, Overall, Mid-Atlantic Cyclo-cross Series
- 1st, Phrophecy Creek
- 1st, Worcester Mass
- 1st, Saturn Liberty Classic
- 1st, Rockville Bridge Classic
- 2nd, Granogue
- 2nd, Highland Park
- 4th, Clif Bar Grand Prix
- 9th, Gran Prix of Gloucester ECV (Big Head)
- 1st, Big Head Championships, Panama R.P.

== See also ==
- 2006/07 UCI Cyclo-cross World Cup
- 2006/07 Cyclo-cross Superprestige

Preceded by Todd Wells	USA Cycling Cyclocross National Championships; 2006-2007	Succeeded by Tim Johnson
