= Jamey Driscoll =

American racing cyclist (born 1986)

James Driscoll
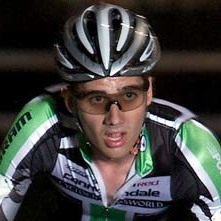
- Jamey Driscoll Riding for Cannondale/Cyclocrossworld.com in 2009

Personal information
- Full name: James Driscoll
- Born: November 11, 1986 (age 39) Jericho, Vermont, United States

Cycling career
- Sport: Cycling
- Current team: Team Jamis (Road); Cannondale/Cyclocrossworld.com (Cyclocross)
- Disciplines: Cyclocross, Road Bike Racing
- Role: Rider

Professional teams
- 2003–2004: Green Mountain Bicycle Club (Road/Cyclocross)
- 2005–2008: Fiordifruita (Road/Cyclocross)
- 2008–: Cannondale/Cyclocrossworld.com (Cyclocross)
- 2009: Bikereg.com/Cannondale (Road)
- 2009: Rock Racing (Road)
- 2010–: Jamis–Sutter Home (Road)

Major wins
- 1 – 1st, CrossVegas, 2009; 1st Overall, Verge New England Cyclocross Championship Series, 2008

James "Jamey" Driscoll (born November 11, 1986, in Jericho, Vermont) is professional American Cyclocross and road racing cyclist. Driscoll's career was thrust into prominence following an eye-opening performance at the 2008 US Cyclocross National Championships in Kansas City, Missouri, where Driscoll bested many of the pre-race favorites en route to a second-place finish – his first career Elite Cyclocross medal. Driscoll made a name for himself riding for the New England–based Fiordifruita team, before signing with the Cannondale/Cyclocrossworld.com professional cyclocross team before the 2008 season. On the road, Driscoll's exploits with Fiordifruita garnered him a spot on the controversial Rock Racing squad at the beginning of the 2009 season. After a tumultuous road season, Driscoll signed with the Jamis–Sutter Home squad for 2010.

== Major Accomplishments ==
In his second full season with the Cannondale/Cyclocrossworld.com team, Driscoll won arguably the biggest race of his career, beating an all-star field at the 2009 edition of Cross Vegas, in Las Vegas, Nevada. Driscoll's only other win of the year came at the second day of the Cycle-Smart International in Northampton, Massachusetts. Despite only two victories on the season, Driscoll wore the leaders jersey for the U.S. Gran Prix of cyclocross following the series' fifth stop, the Mercer Cup, and finished up the series in third place overall. Driscoll consistently performed well in the North American Cyclocross Trophy as well, finishing up third overall in the series standings.

Driscoll's first year with Cannondale/Cyclocrossworld.com brought a wealth of good results, including the overall victory in the Verge New England Cyclocross Championship Series, winning seven of the series' nine races. On the road, Driscoll also won the third stage of the American Eagle Tour of Pennsylvania.

== Championships ==
Driscoll won his first US Cyclocross National Championship as a junior in 2003, in Portland Oregon, one year after finishing in second place. In 2006, Driscoll grabbed his second national championships, this time in the Collegiate Men's category, while riding for the University of Vermont, a feat which he repeated in 2007. Also in 2007, Driscoll was narrowly bested by Bjørn Selander in a two-up sprint for the Espoirs title.

== Palmares ==
2002 – Green Mountain Bicycle Club

- 2nd (Junior) United States Cyclocross National Championships – Portland, OR

2003 – Green Mountain Bicycle Club

- 1st (Junior) United States Cyclocross National Championships – Portland, OR

2006 – Fiordifruita

- 1st (Collegiate) United States Cyclo-cross National Championships- Providence, Rhode Island
- 4th (U23) United States Cyclo-cross National Championships – Providence, Rhode Island

2007 – Fiordifruita

- 1st (Collegiate) United States Cyclo-cross National Championships- Kansas City, Kansas
- 2nd (U23) United States Cyclo-cross National Championships – Kansas City, Kansas

2008 – Cannondale/Cyclocrossworld.com

- 2nd United States Cyclo-cross National Championships – Kansas City, Missouri
- Crank Brothers US Gran Prix of Cyclocross
  - 4th USGP #4 – Mercer Cup #2 West Windsor, New Jersey
- North American Cyclocross Trophy
  - 2nd NACT #8 – Whitmore's Supercross Cup #2 Southampton, New York
- 1st Overall, New England Cyclocross Championship Series (NECCS)
  - 1st NECCS #9 – NBX Gran Prix #2 Warwick, Rhode Island
  - 1st NECCS #8 – NBX Gran Prix #1 Warwick, Rhode Island
  - 1st NECCS #7 – Bay State Cyclocross Sterling, Massachusetts
  - 1st NECCS #6 – Cycle-Smart International #2 Northampton, Vermont
  - 1st NECCS #5 – Cycle-Smart International #1 Northampton, Vermont
  - 1st NECCS #2 – Green Mountain Cyclocross #2 Williston, Vermont
  - 1st NECCS #1 – Green Mountain Cyclocross #1 Williston, Vermont
  - 3rd NECCS #4 – Gran Prix of Gloucester #2 Gloucester, Massachusetts
  - 4th NECCS #3 – Gran Prix of Gloucester #1 Gloucester, Massachusetts
- 1st Nittany Lion Cross Fogelsville, Pennsylvania

2008 – Fiordifruita

- 1st Stage 3 – American Eagle Tour of Pennsylvania

2009 – University of Vermont

- 1st (Collegiate) United States Road Race Championships – Fort Collins, Colorado

2009 – Cannondale/Cyclocrossworld.com

- 3rd Overall, US Gran Prix of Cyclocross
  - 2nd USGP #4 – Derby City Cup #2 Louisville, Kentucky
  - 2nd USGP #3 – Derby City Cup #1 Louisville, Kentucky
  - 3rd USGP #5 – Mercer Cup #1 West Windsor, New Jersey
  - 5th USGP #7 – Portland Cup #1 Portland, OR
  - 5th USGP #6 – Mercer Cup #2 West Windsor, New Jersey
- 3rd Overall, North American Cyclocross Trophy
  - 2nd NACT #5 – Toronto International Cyclocross #1 Toronto, ON
  - 2nd NACT #3 – Gran Prix of Gloucester #1 Gloucester, Massachusetts
  - 3rd NACT #10 – Whitmore's Supercross Cup #2 Southampton, New York
  - 3rd NACT #9 – Witmore's Supercross Cup #1 Southampton, New York
  - 3rd NACT #8 – Boulder Cup Boulder, Colorado
  - 3rd NACT #7 – Blue Sky Velo Cup Longmont, Colorado
  - 3rd NACT #6 – Toronto International Cyclocross #2 Toronto, ON
  - 3rd NACT #2 – Rad Racing Gran Prix Lakewood, WA
  - 4th NACT #4 – Gran Prix of Gloucester #2 Gloucester, Massachusetts
- Verge New England Cyclocross Championship Series
  - 1st NECCS #10 – Cycle-Smart International #2 Northampton, Massachusetts
  - 2nd NECCS #9 – Cycle-Smart International #1 Northampton, Massachusetts
  - 2nd NECCS #6 – Providence Cyclocross #2 Providence, Rhode Island
  - 2nd NECCS #5 – Providence Cyclocross #1 Providence, Rhode Island

Awards and achievements
Preceded by Jesse Anthony	US Cyclocross Junior Men's National Champion; 2003–2004	Succeeded by Bjørn Selander
Preceded by Brent Bookwalter	US Cyclocross Collegiate Men's National Champion; 2006–2007, 2007–2008	Succeeded by Will Dugan
