= Stephen Hyde (cyclist) =

American bicycle racer (born 1987)

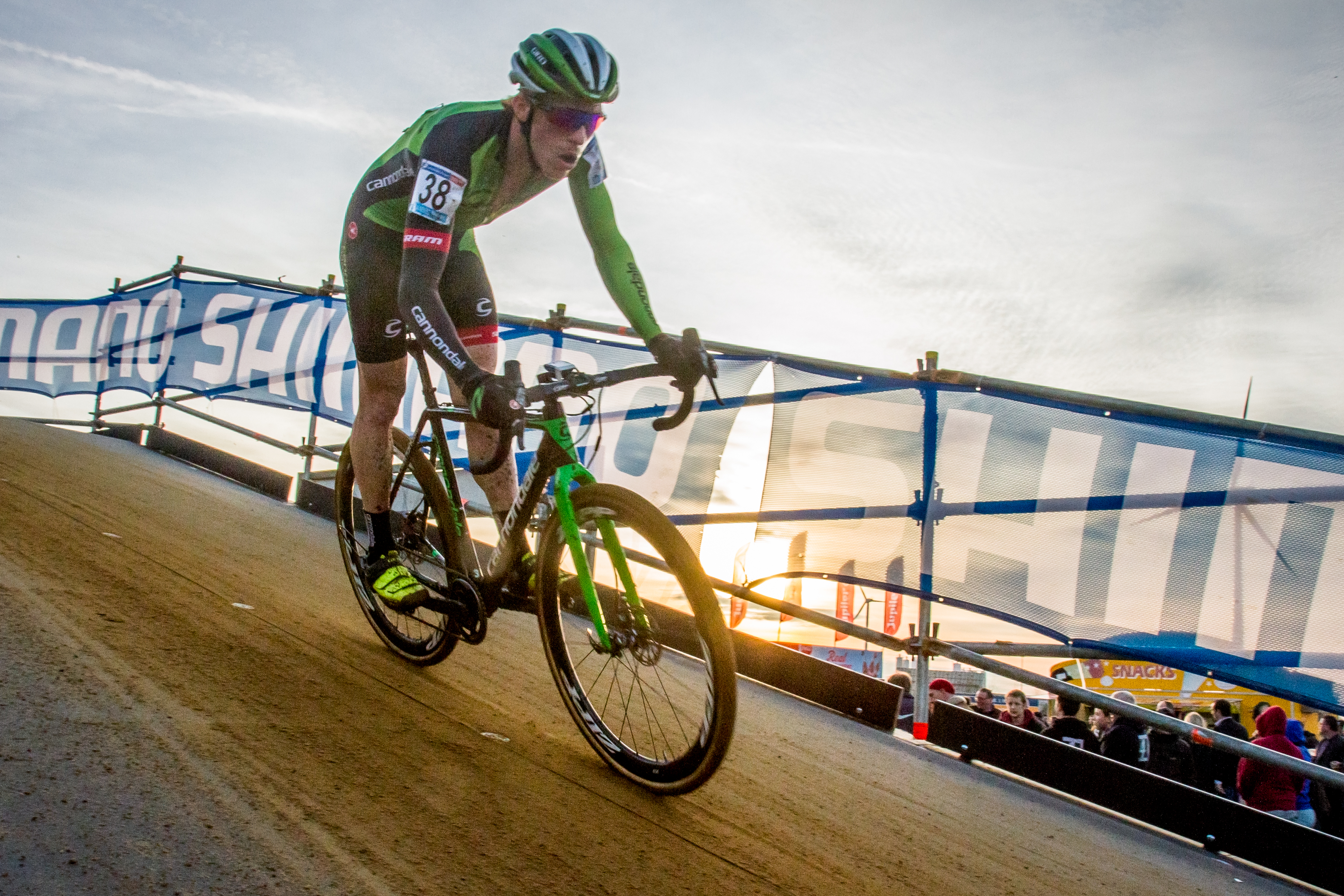

Personal information
- Born: March 10, 1987 (age 39) Saint Croix, U.S. Virgin Islands

Cycling career
- Sport: Cycling
- Current team: Cannondale P/B Cyclocrossworld.com
- Disciplines: Cyclo-cross, Mountain Bike, Road, BMX
- Role: Rider

Professional team
- 2014-2018: Astellas Pro Cycling, Cylance-Incycle Cannondale, Cannondale P/B Cyclocrossworld.com

Major wins
- USA Cyclo-cross National Champion 2017, 2018, 2018 (2); Pan-American Cyclo-cross Champion 2016, 2017

Stephen Hyde (born March 10, 1987) is an American male cyclo-cross cyclist. He represented his nation in the 2015, 2016, 2017 and 2018 men's elite event at the UCI Cyclo-cross World Championships. He won gold medals at the Pan-American Cyclo-cross Championships in 2016 and 2017.
