= Jonathan Page (cyclist) =

American racing cyclist (born 1976)

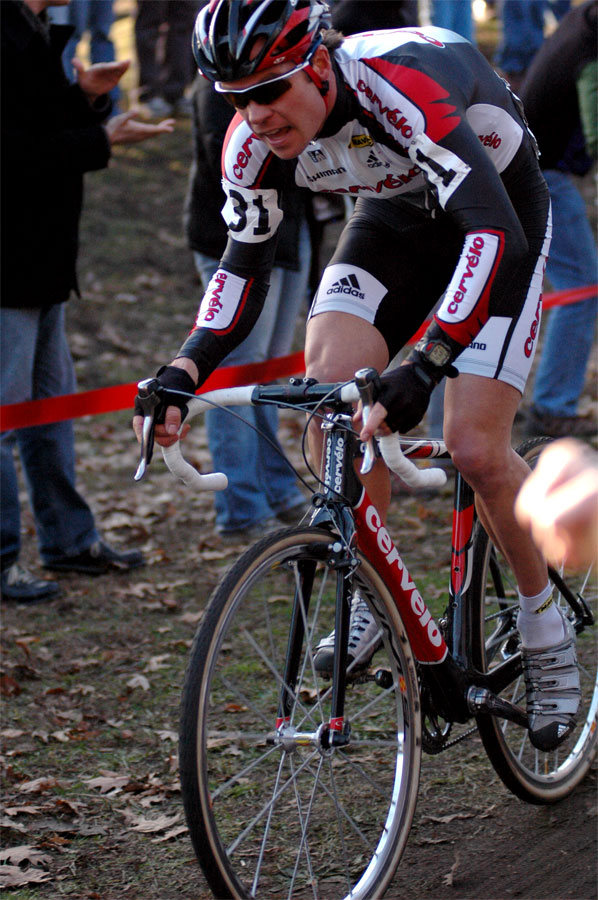

Personal information
- Full name: Jonathan Page
- Born: September 16, 1976 (age 50) United States
- Height: 1.78 m (5 ft 10 in)

Cycling career
- Sport: Cycling
- Current team: Planet Bike
- Discipline: Cyclo-cross
- Role: Rider

Professional teams
- 2003-2006: Colavita Sutter Home
- 2000-2002: CYBC/Richard Sachs Cyclocross Team
- 2003-2004: Selle Italia-Guerciotti, Hot Tubes
- 2005: Liberty Mutual, Cervélo
- 2006: Morgan Blue, Cervélo
- 2007: Sunweb-Projob
- 2008-: Planet Bike

Major wins
- 1st - US National Cyclocross Championships 2004; 1st - US National Cyclocross Championships 2012; 1st - US National Cyclocross Championships 2003; 1st - US National Cyclocross Championships 2002; 2nd - US National Cyclocross Championships 2006; 2nd - CX Worlds 2006/2007; 3rd - US National Cyclocross Championships 2005; 10th - CX Worlds 2005/2006; 14th - CX Worlds 2004/2005
Medal record
Representing United States
Men's cyclo-cross
World Championships
| Silver medal – second place | 2007 Hooglede-Gits | Elite Men's Race |

Jonathan Page (born September 16, 1976, in Tilton, New Hampshire, USA) is an American bicycle racer specializing in cyclo-cross and road racing. He was the USA Cycling National Cyclo-cross Champion in 2002 (primary sponsor Richard Sachs), 2003 (primary sponsor Selle Italia-Guerciotti) and 2004 (primary sponsor Cervélo). Page won his fourth national championship in 2013. He lives in Underhill, Vermont, when not based in Oudenaarde, Belgium during the cyclocross season.

== Career achievements ==
2002–2003
1st, USA Cycling Cyclocross National Championships
2003–2004
1st, USA Cycling Cyclocross National Championships
2004–2005
14th, UCI World Cyclo-cross Championships
1st, USA Cycling Cyclocross National Championships
2005–2006
10th, World Cyclo-cross Championships, Zeddam, The Netherlands
1st, Fitchburg Longsjo Classic
3rd, USA Cycling Cyclocross National Championships, Providence, RI
2006–2007
2nd, UCI World Cyclo-cross Championships, Hooglede-Gits, Belgium
2nd, USA Cycling Cyclocross National Championships, Providence, RI
3rd, Cyclo-cross Gazet van Antwerpen (Oostmalle), Belgium
2007–2008
2nd, USA Cycling Cyclocross National Championships, Kansas City, Kansas
2011–2012
3rd, USA Cycling Cyclocross National Championships, Madison, Wisconsin
2013
1st, USA Cycling Cyclocross National Championships, Verona, Wisconsin

Sporting positions
| Preceded by Todd Wells | USA Cycling Cyclocross National Championships; 2002-2003, 2003-2004, 2004-2005 | Succeeded by Todd Wells |
