= Spanish National Cyclo-cross Championships =

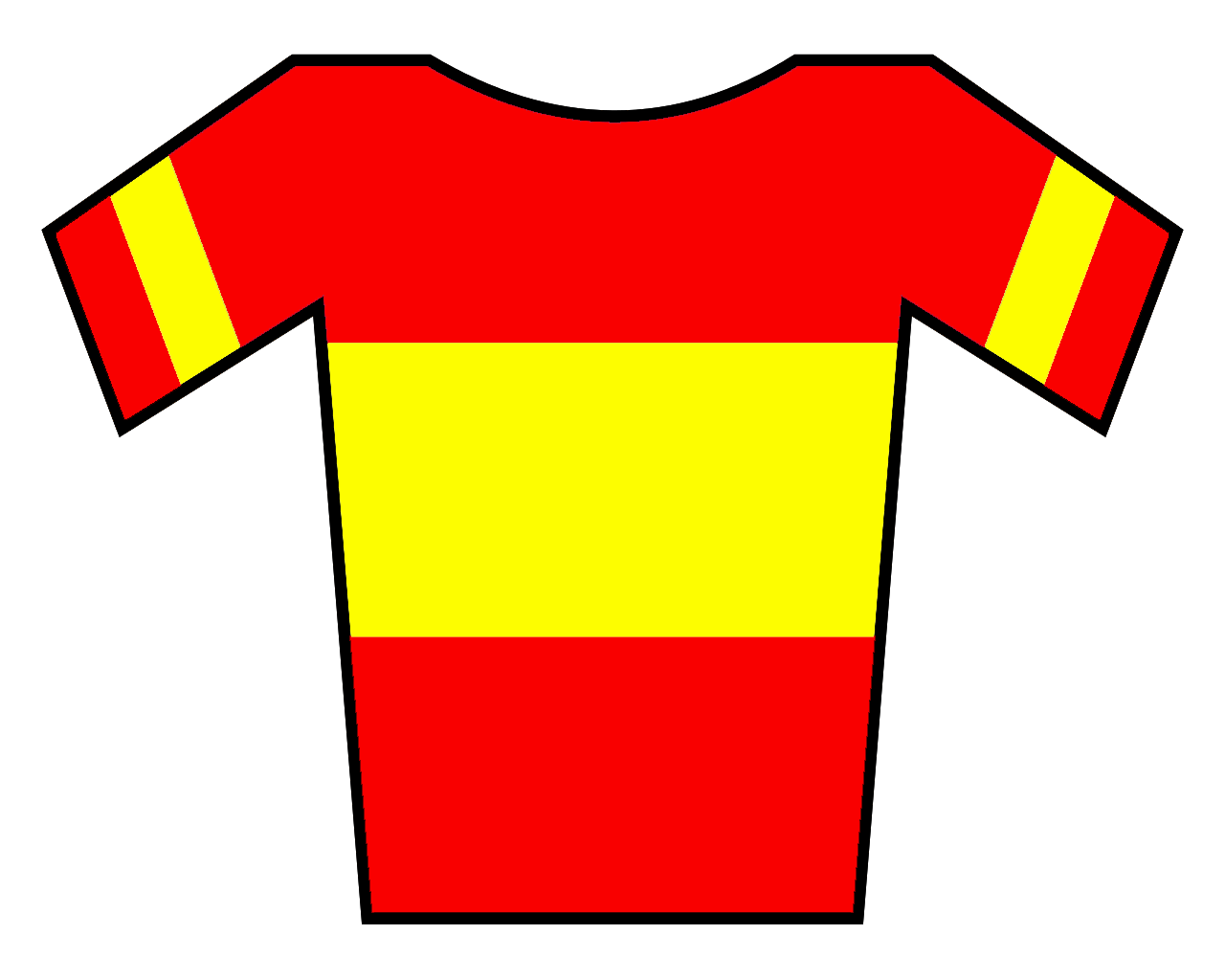

The Spanish National Cyclo-cross Championships are held annually to decide the cycling champions in the cyclo-cross discipline.

== Men ==
Year	Gold	Silver	Bronze
1929	Joaquín Iturri		Eusebio Bastida
1930	No race		
1931	Eusebio Bastida	Joaquín Iturri	Ramón Aguirresarobe
1932–1933	No race		
1934	Fermín Apalategi		
1935	Juan Salarich	Francisco Goenaga	Bonifacio Murillo
1936–1939	No race		
1940	Francisco Goenaga	Juan Bautista Vallejo	Tomás De Sosa
1941	Santiago Mostajo	Juan Bautista Vallejo	Enrique Torres
1942	Julián Berrendero	Francisco Expósito	Juan Bautista Vallejo
1943	Miguel Lizarazu	Sotero Lizarazu	Ignacio Orbaiceta
1944	Julián Berrendero	Miguel Lizarazu	
1945	Miguel Lizarazu	Ignacio Orbaiceta	Sotero Lizarazu
1946	Miguel Lizarazu	Francisco Michelena	Sotero Lizarazu
1947	Sotero Lizarazu	Miguel Lizarazu	Julián Aguirrezabal
1948	Miguel Lizarazu	Francisco Expósito	
1949	No race		
1950	Ignacio Esnaola	Francisco Expósito	Francisco Michelena
1951	Francisco Expósito	Francisco Michelena	Ángel Bruna
1952	Julián Aguirrezabal	Miguel Chacón	Ponciano Arbelaiz
1953	Cosme Barrutia		José Michelena
1954	José Michelena	Antonio Barrutia	Miguel Chacón
1955	Antonio Barrutia	Facundo Zabaleta	Félix Malaxechevarria
1956	José Michelena	Felipe Alberdi	José Luis Talamillo
1957	José Michelena	Facundo Zabaleta	Felipe Alberdi
1958	José Luis Talamillo	José Michelena	
1959	José Luis Talamillo	Antonio Barrutia	Miguel Urquizar
1960	José Luis Talamillo	Miguel Urquizar	Miguel Chacón
1961	Antonio Barrutia	José Luis Talamillo	Alfredo Irusta
1962	José Luis Talamillo		
1963	José Luis Talamillo	Santos Ruiz Bermúdez	
1964	Amelio Mendíjur	José Luis Talamillo	
1965	José Luis Talamillo	Amelio Mendíjur	
1966	Alfredo Irusta		Antonio Barrutia
1967	José Martínez		Alfredo Irusta
1968	José Martínez	Alfredo Irusta	José Martínez Esterlich
1969	Alfredo Irusta	Félix Iturriaga	José María González
1970	José María González	Alfredo Irusta	José Florencio
1971	Alfredo Irusta	Pedro Rodríguez Sanjurjo	José María González
1972	José María Basualdo	José María González	Juan Gorostidi
1973	José María Basualdo	José María González	Juan Gorostidi
1974	Juan Gorostidi	José María González	Ventura Díaz
1975	Juan Gorostidi	José A. Martínez	José María González
1976	José María Basualdo	José A. Martínez Albeniz	Juan Gorostidi
1977	José A. Martínez Albeniz	Juan Gorostidi	Iñaki Mayora
1978	Juan Gorostidi	Fernando Plaza	
1979	José María Yurrebaso	Rafael González	Juan Gorostidi
1980	Iñaki Mayora	Francisco Sala	Jésus Lopez Soriano
1981	Iñaki Mayora	Benito Durán	Juan Gorostidi
1982	Francisco Sala	José María Yurrebaso	Iñaki Mayora
1983	Iñaki Mayora	José Ramón Izagirre	José María Yurrebaso
1984	Iñaki Mayora	José María Yurrebaso	José Iñaki Vijandi
1985	Francisco Sala	José María Yurrebaso	Iñaki Mayora
1986	José Iñaki Vijandi	José María Yurrebaso	Iñaki Mayora
1987	Francisco Sala	Jon Egiarte	José Iñaki Vijandi
1988	Francisco Sala	José Iñaki Vijandi	José María Yurrebaso
1989	José María Yurrebaso	Francisco Sala	Jon Egiarte
1990	José María Yurrebaso	Francisco Sala	Federico Echave
1991	José Ramón Izagirre		Federico Echave
1992	José Ramón Izagirre	Jokin Mújika	Benito Durán
1993	Jokin Mújika	José Ramón Izagirre	Gonzalo Aguiar
1994	Jokin Mújika	Iñigo Igartua	Francisco Pla
1995	Francisco Pla	Abel Maceira	Iñigo Igartua
1996	Jokin Mújika	David Seco	Mikel Insausti
1997	Abel Maceira	David Seco	Iñaki Cendrero
1998	Francisco Pla	Iñaki Cendrero	David Seco
1999	Francisco Pla	David Seco	Abel Maceira
2000	David Seco	Francisco Mena	Francisco Pla
2001	David Seco	José Manuel Osuna	Iñaki Cendrero
2002	David Seco	Juan Carlos Garro	Israel Nuñez
2003	David Seco	Juan Carlos Garro	Gaizka Lejarreta
2004	David Seco	Fernando Fernández	Haiti Ortiz
2005	Unai Yus	David Seco	Isaac Suarez
2006	David Seco	Óscar Vázquez	Isaac Suarez
2007	José Antonio Hermida	Isaac Suárez	Óscar Vázquez
2008	José Antonio Hermida	Isaac Suárez	Javier Ruiz de Larrinaga
2009	Javier Ruiz de Larrinaga	Isaac Suárez	Constantino Zaballa
2010	Javier Ruiz de Larrinaga	José Antonio Hermida	Egoitz Murgoitio
2011	Javier Ruiz de Larrinaga	José Antonio Hermida	Isaac Suárez
2012	Isaac Suárez	Egoitz Murgoitio	Sergio Mantecón
2013	Aitor Hernández	Egoitz Murgoitio	Javier Ruiz de Larrinaga
2014	Javier Ruiz de Larrinaga	Aitor Hernández	Aketza Peña
2015	Aitor Hernández	Javier Ruiz de Larrinaga	José Antonio Hermida
2016	Javier Ruiz de Larrinaga	Kevin Suárez Fernández	Ismael Esteban
2017	Ismael Esteban	Kevin Suárez Fernández	Javier Ruiz de Larrinaga
2018	Ismael Esteban	Felipe Orts	Aitor Hernández
2019	Felipe Orts	Ismael Esteban	Javier Ruiz de Larrinaga
2020	Felipe Orts	Kevin Suárez Fernández	Gorka Izagirre
2021	Felipe Orts	Kevin Suárez Fernández	Ismael Esteban
2022	Felipe Orts	Kevin Suárez Fernández	Iván Feijoo
2023	Felipe Orts	Jofre Cullell	Kevin Suárez Fernández
2024	Felipe Orts	Gonzalo Inguanzo	Mario Junquera
2025	Felipe Orts	Jofre Cullell	Mario Junquera
2026	Felipe Orts	Kevin Suárez Fernández	Mario Junquera

=== U23 ===
Year	Gold	Silver	Bronze
1996	Mikel Artetxe	Haimar Zubeldia	Igor Beristain
1997	Mikel Artetxe	Ramón Iglesias	Óscar Pereiro
1998	Óscar Pereiro	Manuel Armada	Arkaitz Ordorika
1999	Óscar Pereiro	Zugaitz Ayuso	Joseba León
2000	Juan Bello	Iván Martínez	David Salas
2001	Isaac Suárez	Iván Martínez	David Salas
2002	Sem Mújica	Narciso Piñeiro	Aitor Hernández
2003	Egoitz Murgoitio	Haitz Ortiz	Julen Zubero
2004	Ismael Esteban	Egoitz Murgoitio	Óscar Vázquez
2005	Ismael Esteban	Néstor Rodríguez	Rubén Ruzafa
2006	Rubén Ruzafa	Asier Corchero	Mauro González
2007	David Lozano	Ander Gómez	Mauro González
2008	David Lozano	Eduard Recassens	Gorka Izagirre
2009	David Lozano	Daniel Ania	Mauro González
2010	David Lozano	Iñigo Gómez	Daniel Ruiz
2011	Jon Ander Insausti	Daniel Ruiz	Óscar Bonete
2012	Marcos Altur	Iñigo Gómez	Ion Gómez
2013	Jonathan Lastra	Kevin Suárez	Iñigo Gómez
2014	Jonathan Lastra	Jon Ander Insausti	Álex Aranburu
2015	Kevin Suárez	Felipe Orts	Raúl Fernández
2016	Felipe Orts	Adrián Garcia	Mario Junquera
2017	Felipe Orts	Samuel González	Jokin Alberdi
2018	Jofre Cullell	Mario Junquera	Xabier Murias
2019	Iván Feijoo	Jofre Cullell	Xabier Murias
2020	Iván Feijoo	Gonzalo Inguanzo	Xabier Murias
2021	Iván Feijoo	Jofre Cullell	Xabier Murias
2022	Javier Zaera Gisbert	Gonzalo Inguanzo Macho	Miguel Rodríguez Novoa

=== Junior ===
Year	Gold	Silver	Bronze
1993	Igor Astarloa	Roberto Ramírez	Aitor Díaz
1994	Igor Astarloa	Roberto Ramírez	Iban Mayo
1995	Iban Mayo	Mikel Artetxe	Haimar Zubeldia
1996	Gaizka Lejarreta	Juan Bello	Julen Fernández
1997	Aitor Galdós	Zugaitz Ayuso	Andoni Aranaga
1998	Raúl Salas	Haitz Ortiz	Aitor Núñez
1999	Pablo San José	Narciso Piñeiro	Haitz Ortiz
2000	Koldobika Aguirre	José Antonio Díez	Julen Zubero
2001	Koldobika Aguirre	Andrés Estévez	Ismael Esteban
2002	Eladio Sánchez	Onaitz Munduate	Xabier Goenaga
2003	Néstor Rodríguez	Delio Fernández	Gorka Ruiz de Gordoa
2004	Miguel Vallés	Hugo Martínez	Jokin Irazola
2005	Erlantz Uriarte	Víctor Rodríguez	Ander Gómez
2006	David Lozano	Adrián Rodríguez	Jon Izaguirre
2007	Jon Ander Manjón	Hermes González	Fernando San Emeterio
2008	Fernando San Emeterio	Josep Nadal	Íñigo Gómez
2009	Josep Nadal	Íñigo Gómez	Ismael Félix Barba
2010	Jon Ander Insausti	Peio Goikoetxea	Paulo González
2011	Pablo Rodríguez Guede	Jonathan Lastra	Marcos Altur
2012	Kevin Suárez	José Manuel Ribera	Jaime Campo
2013	Felipe Orts	Álex Aranburu	Diego Pablo Sevilla
2014	Raúl Fernández	Vicent Martínez	Josep Llinares
2015	Jokin Alberdi	Jon Gil	Richard Brun
2016	Jokin Alberdi	Iván Feijoo	Jofre Cullell
2017	Iván Feijoo	Jofre Cullell	Xabier Murias
2018	Carlos Canal	Gonzalo Inguanzo	Adrián Barros
2019	Carlos Canal	Gonzalo Inguanzo	Ibai Ruiz de Arcaute
2020	Igor Arrieta	Aitzol Sasieta	Alain Suárez
2021	Miguel Rodríguez Novoa	Alain Suárez	Rubén Sánchez Estévez
2022	Ricardo Buba Sopko	Raúl Mira Bonastre	Carlos Gámez Ferrer

== Women ==
Year	Gold	Silver	Bronze
1999	Maria Carmen Armada	Maria Fernanda Espineira	Maria Jesus Barrios
2000	Rocio Gamonal	Lidia Fuentes	Maria Jesus Barrios
2001	Maria Carmen Armada	Maria Fernanda Espineira	Lidia Fuentes
2002	Aida Nuño Palacio	Rocio Gamonal	Nekane Lasa
2003	Aida Nuño Palacio	Nekane Lasa	Rocio Gamonal
2004	Nekane Lasa	Rocio Gamonal	Ruth Moll
2005	Rosa Bravo	Rocio Gamonal	Ruth Moll
2006	Rosa Bravo	Rocio Gamonal	Ruth Moll
2007	Rocio Gamonal	Rosa Bravo	Ruth Moll
2008	Ruth Moll	Rocio Gamonal	Ione Mujika
2009	Rocio Gamonal	Margarida Fullana	Rosa Bravo
2010	Rocio Gamonal	Rocio Martín	Rosa Bravo
2011	Aida Nuño Palacio	Lucía González	Mercedes Pacios
2012	Rocio Martín	Isabel Castro	Lucía González
2013	Lucía González	Aida Nuño Palacio	Olatz Odriozola
2014	Aida Nuño Palacio	Rocio Martín	Rocio Gamonal
2015	Rocio Gamonal	Lucía González	Aida Nuño Palacio
2016	Aida Nuño Palacio	Lucía González	Alicia González
2017	Alicia González	Aida Nuño Palacio	Lucía González
2018	Aida Nuño	Lucía González	Olatz Odriozola
2019	Aida Nuño	Lucía González	Luisa Ibarrola
2020	Lucía González	Aida Nuño	Paula Díaz
2021	Lucía González	Aida Nuño	Sara Cueto
2022	Lucía González	Aida Nuño	Sofia Rodríguez
