= 2007 in men's cyclo-cross =

== News ==
=== January ===
- 1 – Sven Nys wins the Grand Prix Sven Nys in Baal where he resides, winning the competition for the sixth time, this time finishing in front of 2006 winner Lars Boom, while fellow Baal citizen Niels Albert finishes in third position. svennys.com
- 3 – Richard Groenendaal wins the Centrumcross Surhuisterveen for the third consecutive time. It was his first win of the season. rabobank.nl
- 7 – Bart Wellens, Lars Boom, Petr Dlask, Enrico Franzoi and Francis Mourey all become national champion after beating their fellow countrymen in the world's top nations. cycling4all.com
- 14 – Sven Nys celebrates his sixth World Cup victory of the season as he wins the Grand Prix Nommay. velonews.com
- 14 – Ben Berden returns to the sport after being suspended for two years due to the use of doping with a third place in the Grand Prix Jean Bausch-Pierre Kellner. dewielersite.net
- 17 – Sven Nys wins the first ever held indoor cyclo-cross race named the Flanders Indoor Cyclo-cross held in Mechelen. He won the race in the final, after finishing only fourth in the first of two heats. svennys.com
- 19 – Rabobank retreats Boy van Poppel from the World Championships and further cyclo-cross competitions as the Dutchman suffers from heart problems. Van Poppel has to undergo medical examination before he is allowed back in competition. dewielersite.net
- 26 – Francis Mourey is taken to hospital after falling in a training. Therefore, he will miss the World Championships and is unable to defend his bronze medal from 2006. hln.be
- 27 – Lars Boom finishes way in front of his first opponent Niels Albert to claim the world title in the under 23s category. Junior World Cup winner Joeri Adams outsprints his opponents in the final metres of the race to win his rainbow jersey. , cyclingnews.com
- 28 – Erwin Vervecken successfully defends his world title after winning in an exciting race where the top favourites were eliminated due to a plastic block. cyclingnews.com
- 29 – Bart Wellens, who broke his wrist during the World Championships after being hit by a plastic block, touched by a television motorcyclist demands 60,000 Euros for the matter as his season is over. telesport.nl

== World championships ==
=== Elite ===
Pos.	Cyclist	Time
1st place, gold medalist(s)	(Belgium) Erwin Vervecken	1:05.35
2nd place, silver medalist(s)	(United States) Jonathan Page	+ 0.03
3rd place, bronze medalist(s)	(Italy) Enrico Franzoi	+ 0.16
4.	(Belgium) Bart Wellens	+ 0.25
5.	(Belgium) Kevin Pauwels	+ 0.32

=== Under 23s ===
Pos.	Cyclist	Time
1st place, gold medalist(s)	(Netherlands) Lars Boom	53.53
2nd place, silver medalist(s)	(Belgium) Niels Albert	+ 1.22
3rd place, bronze medalist(s)	(France) Romain Villa	+ 1.44
4.	(Czech Republic) Zdeněk Štybar	+ 2.29
5.	(Germany) Philipp Walsleben	+ 2.49

=== Juniors ===
Pos.	Cyclist	Time
1st place, gold medalist(s)	(Belgium) Joeri Adams	41.18
2nd place, silver medalist(s)	(United States) Danny Summerhill	+ 0.00
3rd place, bronze medalist(s)	(Czech Republic) Jiri Polnicky	+ 0.01
4.	(Netherlands) Ramon Sinkeldam	+ 0.02
5.	(Germany) Ole Quast	+ 0.11

== World Cup ==
Date	Place	Winner	Leader
1 October 2006	(Switzerland) Cyclophile Aigle	(Belgium) Sven Nys	(Belgium) Sven Nys
22 October 2006	(Belgium) Cyclo-cross Kalmthout	(Belgium) Sven Nys	(Belgium) Sven Nys
28 October 2006	(Czech Republic) Cyklokros Tábor	(Czech Republic) Radomir Simunek jr.	(Belgium) Sven Nys
4 November 2006	(Italy) Grand Prix Lago le Bandie	(France) Francis Mourey	(Belgium) Sven Nys
12 November 2006	(Netherlands) Veldrit Pijnacker	(Belgium) Sven Nys	(Belgium) Sven Nys
25 November 2006	(Belgium) Duinencross Koksijde	(Belgium) Sven Nys	(Belgium) Sven Nys
3 December 2006	(Spain) Ziklokross Igorre	(Belgium) Sven Nys	(Belgium) Sven Nys
8 December 2006	(Italy) Trofeo Mamma & Papà Guerciotti	(Belgium) Bart Wellens	(Belgium) Sven Nys
26 December 2006	(Belgium) Kersttrofee Hofstade	(Belgium) Erwin Vervecken	(Belgium) Sven Nys
14 January 2007	(France) Grand Prix Nommay	(Belgium) Sven Nys	(Belgium) Sven Nys
21 January 2007	(Netherlands) Grand Prix Adrie van der Poel	(Belgium) Sven Nys	(Belgium) Sven Nys

== Superprestige ==
Date	Place	Winner	Leader
15 October 2006	(Belgium) Cyclo-cross Ruddervoorde	(Belgium) Sven Nys	(Belgium) Sven Nys
29 October 2006	(Netherlands) Super Prestige Sint-Michielsgestel	(Belgium) Sven Nys	(Belgium) Sven Nys
19 November 2006	(Belgium) Superprestige Gavere	(Belgium) Sven Nys	(Belgium) Sven Nys
26 November 2006	(Netherlands) Superprestige Gieten	(Belgium) Sven Nys	(Belgium) Sven Nys
6 December 2006	(Belgium) Bollekescross	(Belgium) Sven Nys	(Belgium) Sven Nys
31 December 2006	(Belgium) Superprestige Diegem	(Belgium) Sven Nys	(Belgium) Sven Nys
4 February 2007	(Belgium) Vlaamse Aardbeiencross	(Belgium) Sven Nys	(Belgium) Sven Nys

== Gazet van Antwerpen ==
Date	Place	Winner	Leader
1 November 2006	(Belgium) Cyclo-cross Koppenberg	(Belgium) Sven Nys	(Belgium) Sven Nys
11 November 2006	(Belgium) Niel Jaarmarkt Cyclo-cross	(Belgium) Bart Wellens	(Belgium) Sven Nys
18 November 2006	(Belgium) Grand Prix van Hasselt	(Netherlands) Gerben de Knegt	(Belgium) Bart Wellens
16 December 2006	(Belgium) Grand Prix Rouwmoer	(Belgium) Sven Nys	(Belgium) Bart Wellens
28 December 2006	(Belgium) Azencross	(Belgium) Niels Albert	(Belgium) Sven Nys
1 January 2007	(Belgium) Grand Prix Sven Nys	(Belgium) Sven Nys	(Belgium) Sven Nys
3 February 2007	(Belgium) Krawatencross	(Belgium) Sven Nys	(Belgium) Sven Nys

== Other 2007 Cyclo-cross races ==
Date	Place	Winner	Second	Third
1 January 2007	(Luxembourg) Grand Prix du Nouvel-An	(France) David Pagnier	(United States) Jonathan Page	(Czech Republic) Pavel Adel
2 January 2007	(Belgium) Grand Prix De Ster Sint-Niklaas	(Belgium) Sven Nys	(France) Maxime Lefebvre	(Netherlands) Richard Groenendaal
2 January 2007	(Switzerland) Flüüger Quer Dübendorf	(Switzerland) Simon Zahner	(Switzerland) Christian Heule	(Switzerland) Thomas Frischknecht
3 January 2007	(Netherlands) Centrumcross Surhuisterveen	(Netherlands) Richard Groenendaal	(Netherlands) Gerben de Knegt	(Belgium) Erwin Vervecken
7 January 2007	(Spain) Premio San Román Muxika	(Spain) Isaac Suarez Fernandez	(Spain) Unai Emilio Yus Querejeta	(Spain) Oscar Vázquez Crespo
8 January 2007	(Belgium) Nationale Cyclo-Cross Otegem	(Belgium) Sven Nys	(Belgium) Sven Vanthourenhout	(Belgium) Jan Verstraeten
10 January 2007	(Belgium) Scheldecross Antwerpen	(Belgium) Niels Albert	(Belgium) Erwin Vervecken	(Czech Republic) Zdeněk Štybar
13 January 2007	(France) CC GP Lille Métropole	(Netherlands) Gerben de Knegt	(Belgium) Erwin Vervecken	(France) John Gadret
14 January 2007	(Luxembourg) GP Jean Bausch	(Luxembourg) Jean-Pierre Drucker	(Belgium) Arne Daelmans	(Belgium) Ben Berden
14 January 2007	(England) Derby Cyclo-cross Series	(United Kingdom) Philip Dixon	(United Kingdom) Nick Craig	(United Kingdom) Robert Jebb
17 January 2007	(Belgium) Flanders Indoor Cyclo-cross	(Belgium) Sven Nys	(Belgium) Niels Albert	(Belgium) Sven Vanthourenhout
20 January 2007	(Belgium) Kasteelcross Zonnebeke	(Belgium) Sven Vanthourenhout	(Italy) Enrico Franzoi	(Belgium) David Willemsens
20 January 2007	(Spain) Ciclo Cross de Iraeta	(Spain) Unai Emilio Yus Querejeta	(Spain) José Antonio Garrido	(Spain) David Pena
22 January 2007	(Spain) GP Ayuntamiento de Ispaster	(France) Arnaud Labbe	(Spain) Isaac Suarez Fernandez	(Slovakia) Milan Barenyi
31 January 2007	(Belgium) Cyclocross Vossenhol-Maldegem	(Belgium) Sven Nys	(Belgium) Niels Albert	(Belgium) David Willemsens

== National Championships ==
Date	Country	Elite	U23	Junior
7 January	Austria	Peter Presslauer; Roland Mörx; Gerald Hauer	Daniel Federspiel; Patrick Schörkmayer; Matthias Rupp	
7 January	Belgium	Bart Wellens; Klaas Vantornout; Sven Nys	Niels Albert; Rob Peeters; Dieter Vanthourenhout	Jim Aernouts; Stef Boden; Vincent Baestaens
14 January	Croatia	David Demanuelle; Emanuel Kišerlovski; Bojan Rafaj	Vinko Zaninovic; Moreno Vrancich; Mario Zubcic	Igor Crnila; Marko Ivancic; Marijan Perkovic
6 January	Czech Republic	Petr Dlask; Zdeněk Štybar; Radomir Simunek jr.		
7 January	Denmark	Joachim Parbo; Tommy Moberg Nielsen; Christian Poulsen		Morten Gregersen; Michael Kohberg; Jonas Guddal
7 January	France	Francis Mourey; John Gadret; Jérôme Chevallier	Romain Villa; Aurélien Duval; Arnold Jeannesson	Arnaud Jouffroy; Thomas Girard; Matthieu Boulo
7 January	Germany	René Birkenfeld; Johannes Sickmüller; Thorsten Struch	Philipp Wasleben; Sascha Wagner; Finn Heitmann	Ole Quast; Max Walsleben; Josef Rauber
7 January	United Kingdom	Philip Dixon; Nick Craig; Robert Jebb	Ian Bibby; Ian Field; Ross Creber	Alex Paton; Scott Thwaites; Jonathan McEvoy
6 January	Ireland	Robin Seymour; Roger Aiken; Lewis Ferguson		Sean Downey; Graham Boyd; Francis Newton
6 January	Italy	Enrico Franzoi; Marco Aurelio Fontana; Marco Bianco	Rafael Visinelli; Cristian Cominelli; Davide Malacarne	Matteo Trentin; Alessandro Calderan; Elia Silvestri
7 January	Luxembourg	Gusty Bausch; Pascal Triebel; Jean-Pierre Drucker		Tom Thill; Philippe Hutmacher; Tom Kohn
7 January	Netherlands	Lars Boom; Richard Groenendaal; Gerben de Knegt	Thijs van Amerongen; Ricardo van der Velden; Boy van Poppel	Ramon Sinkeldam; Jordy Beuker; Twan van den Brand
7 January	Poland	Marek Cichosz; Dariusz Gil; Mariusz Gil	Marcin Sobiepanek; Sylwester Janiszewski; Tomasz Repinski	Marek Konwa; Kacper Szczepaniak; Miroslaw Frackowiak
7 January	Slovakia	Maroš Kovác; Milan Barenyi; Robert Glajza	Robert Gavenda; Robert Bachraty; Branislav Zachar	Peter Sagan
13 January	Spain	Jose Hermida Ramos; Isaac Suarez Fernandez; Oscar Vázquez Crespo	David Lozano Riba; Ander Gomez Elorriaga; Mauro Gonzalez Fontan	Jon Ander Manjon Alvarez; Hermes Gonzalez; Fernando San Emeterio Gandiaga
7 January	Switzerland	Christian Heule; Simon Zahner; Florian Vogel	Yves Corminboeuf; Nino Schurter; Julien Taramarcaz	Matthias Rupp; Arnaud Grand; Pierre Käslin
