= 2018 Volta a la Comunitat Valenciana =

2018 UCI Europe Tour

Race details
- Dates: 31 January–4 February 2018
- Stages: 5
- Distance: 661.6 km (411.1 mi)
- Winning time: 16h 14' 53"

Results
	Winner	Alejandro Valverde (ESP)
	Second	Luis León Sánchez (ESP)
	Third	Jakob Fuglsang (DEN)
	Mountains	Preben Van Hecke (BEL)
	Young rider	Kilian Frankiny (SUI)
	Combination	Thomas Sprengers (BEL)
	Sprints	Thomas Sprengers (BEL)
	Team	Astana

The 69th edition of the Volta a la Comunitat Valenciana (English: Tour of the Valencian Community) was a road cycling stage race held from 31 January to 4 February 2018. It was run over five stages, of which one was a team time trial, covering a total distance of 691.8 km. It was a 2.1 event of the 2018 UCI Europe Tour. The race was run entirely in the autonomous community of Valencia, starting in Orpesa and finishing in Valencia.

The race was won by Spaniard Alejandro Valverde of Movistar Team, who also won two stages. Luis León Sánchez was second, Jakob Fuglsang third. Valverde's overall win was his third in the race after 2004 and 2007, which made him the recordholder of the Volta a la Comunitat Valenciana.

== Teams ==
Twenty-five teams started the race. Each team had a maximum of seven riders:

UCI WorldTeams

- Movistar Team
- BMC Racing Team
- LottoNL–Jumbo
- Mitchelton–Scott
- AG2R La Mondiale
- Team Dimension Data
- Team Sky
- Team Katusha–Alpecin
- Bahrain–Merida
- EF Education First–Drapac p/b Cannondale
- Astana

UCI Professional teams

- CCC–Sprandi–Polkowice
- Gazprom–RusVelo
- Israel Cycling Academy
- Rally Cycling
- Euskadi–Murias
- Nippo–Vini Fantini–Europa Ovini
- Cofidis
- Sport Vlaanderen–Baloise
- Direct Énergie
- Caja Rural–Seguros RGA
- Burgos BH

UCI Continental teams

- Polartec–Kometa
- Inteja Dominican Cycling Team
- Fundación Euskadi

== Route ==
Stage characteristics and winners
Stage	Date	Course	Distance	Type	Stage winner
1	31 January	Oropesa del Mar to Peniscola	191.5 km (119.0 mi)	Flat stage	Danny van Poppel (NED)
2	1 February	Bétera to Albuixech	153.9 km (95.6 mi)	Medium mountain stage	Alejandro Valverde (ESP)
3	2 February	Benitachell / El Poble Nou de Benitatxell to Calp	23.2 km (14.4 mi)	Team time trial	BMC Racing Team
4	3 February	Orihuela to Cocentaina	181 km (112 mi)	Mountain stage	Alejandro Valverde (ESP)
5	4 February	Paterna to Valencia	135.2 km (84.0 mi)	Flat stage	Jürgen Roelandts (BEL)

== Stages ==
=== Stage 1 ===
Stage 1 result

Rank	Rider	Team	Time
1	Danny van Poppel (NED)	LottoNL–Jumbo	4h 34' 13"
2	Luka Mezgec (SLO)	Mitchelton–Scott	s.t.
3	Jürgen Roelandts (BEL)	BMC Racing Team	s.t.
4	Daniel McLay (GBR)	EF Education First–Drapac p/b Cannondale	s.t.
5	Clément Venturini (FRA)	AG2R La Mondiale	s.t.
6	Hugo Hofstetter (FRA)	Cofidis	s.t.
7	Michał Kwiatkowski (POL)	Team Sky	s.t.
8	Oliver Naesen (BEL)	AG2R La Mondiale	s.t.
9	Marco Canola (ITA)	Nippo–Vini Fantini–Europa Ovini	s.t.
10	Angelo Tulik (FRA)	Direct Énergie	s.t.

General classification after Stage 1

Rank	Rider	Team	Time
1	Danny van Poppel (NED)	LottoNL–Jumbo	4h 34' 03"
2	Luka Mezgec (SLO)	Mitchelton–Scott	+ 4"
3	Jürgen Roelandts (BEL)	BMC Racing Team	+ 6"
4	Daniel McLay (GBR)	EF Education First–Drapac p/b Cannondale	+ 10"
5	Clément Venturini (FRA)	AG2R La Mondiale	s.t.
6	Hugo Hofstetter (FRA)	Cofidis	s.t.
7	Michał Kwiatkowski (POL)	Team Sky	s.t.
8	Oliver Naesen (BEL)	AG2R La Mondiale	s.t.
9	Marco Canola (ITA)	Nippo–Vini Fantini–Europa Ovini	s.t.
10	Angelo Tulik (FRA)	Direct Énergie	s.t.

=== Stage 2 ===
Stage 2 result

Rank	Rider	Team	Time
1	Alejandro Valverde (ESP)	Movistar Team	3h 53' 55"
2	Luis León Sánchez (ESP)	Astana	s.t.
3	Jakob Fuglsang (DEN)	Astana	s.t.
4	Giovanni Visconti (ITA)	Bahrain–Merida	+ 19"
5	Greg Van Avermaet (BEL)	BMC Racing Team	s.t.
6	Merhawi Kudus (ERI)	Team Dimension Data	s.t.
7	Pello Bilbao (ESP)	Astana	s.t.
8	Alexis Vuillermoz (FRA)	AG2R La Mondiale	s.t.
9	Ben Hermans (BEL)	Israel Cycling Academy	s.t.
10	Adam Yates (GBR)	Mitchelton–Scott	s.t.

General classification after Stage 2

Rank	Rider	Team	Time
1	Alejandro Valverde (ESP)	Movistar Team	8h 27' 58"
2	Luis León Sánchez (ESP)	Astana	+ 4"
3	Jakob Fuglsang (DEN)	Astana	+ 6"
4	Wout Poels (NED)	Team Sky	+ 29"
5	Diego Rosa (ITA)	Team Sky	s.t.
6	Pello Bilbao (ESP)	Astana	s.t.
7	Greg Van Avermaet (BEL)	BMC Racing Team	s.t.
8	David de la Cruz (ESP)	Team Sky	s.t.
9	Primož Roglič (SLO)	LottoNL–Jumbo	s.t.
10	Brent Bookwalter (USA)	BMC Racing Team	s.t.

=== Stage 3 ===
The time trial result was neutralised.

Stage 3 result

Rank	Team	Time
1	BMC Racing Team	27' 24"
2	Astana	+ 1' 08"
3	AG2R La Mondiale	+ 1' 12"
4	Gazprom–RusVelo	+ 1' 36"
5	CCC–Sprandi–Polkowice	s.t.
6	Team Katusha–Alpecin	+ 1' 43"
7	Euskadi–Murias	+ 1' 46"
8	Sport Vlaanderen–Baloise	+ 1' 54"
9	Cofidis	+ 2' 14"
10	Direct Énergie	+ 2' 15"

General classification after Stage 3

Rank	Rider	Team	Time
1	Alejandro Valverde (ESP)	Movistar Team	8h 27' 58"
2	Luis León Sánchez (ESP)	Astana	+ 4"
3	Jakob Fuglsang (DEN)	Astana	+ 6"
4	Wout Poels (NED)	Team Sky	+ 29"
5	Diego Rosa (ITA)	Team Sky	s.t.
6	Pello Bilbao (ESP)	Astana	s.t.
7	Greg Van Avermaet (BEL)	BMC Racing Team	s.t.
8	David de la Cruz (ESP)	Team Sky	s.t.
9	Primož Roglič (SLO)	LottoNL–Jumbo	s.t.
10	Brent Bookwalter (USA)	BMC Racing Team	s.t.

=== Stage 4 ===
Stage 4 result

Rank	Rider	Team	Time
1	Alejandro Valverde (ESP)	Movistar Team	4h 48' 35"
2	Adam Yates (GBR)	Mitchelton–Scott	+ 4"
3	Luis León Sánchez (ESP)	Astana	s.t.
4	Jesús Herrada (ESP)	Cofidis	+ 9"
5	Primož Roglič (SLO)	LottoNL–Jumbo	+ 10"
6	Jakob Fuglsang (DEN)	Astana	s.t.
7	Pello Bilbao (ESP)	Astana	+ 15"
8	Roman Kreuziger (CZE)	Mitchelton–Scott	+ 18"
9	Kilian Frankiny (SUI)	BMC Racing Team	+ 24"
10	Ben Hermans (BEL)	Israel Cycling Academy	+ 30"

General classification after Stage 4

Rank	Rider	Team	Time
1	Alejandro Valverde (ESP)	Movistar Team	13h 16' 23"
2	Luis León Sánchez (ESP)	Astana	+ 14"
3	Jakob Fuglsang (DEN)	Astana	+ 26"
4	Adam Yates (GBR)	Mitchelton–Scott	+ 37"
5	Jesús Herrada (ESP)	Cofidis	+ 48"
6	Primož Roglič (SLO)	LottoNL–Jumbo	+ 49"
7	Pello Bilbao (ESP)	Astana	+ 54"
8	Roman Kreuziger (CZE)	Mitchelton–Scott	+ 57"
9	Kilian Frankiny (SUI)	BMC Racing Team	+ 1' 03"
10	Amaro Antunes (POR)	CCC–Sprandi–Polkowice	+ 1' 09"

=== Stage 5 ===
Stage 5 result

Rank	Rider	Team	Time
1	Jürgen Roelandts (BEL)	BMC Racing Team	2h 58' 26"
2	Danny van Poppel (NED)	LottoNL–Jumbo	s.t.
3	Clément Venturini (FRA)	AG2R La Mondiale	+ 1"
4	Nelson Soto (COL)	Caja Rural–Seguros RGA	s.t.
5	Baptiste Planckaert (BEL)	Team Katusha–Alpecin	s.t.
6	Christophe Noppe (BEL)	Sport Vlaanderen–Baloise	s.t.
7	Marco Canola (ITA)	Nippo–Vini Fantini–Europa Ovini	s.t.
8	Yevgeniy Gidich (KAZ)	Astana	s.t.
9	Jonas Koch (GER)	CCC–Sprandi–Polkowice	s.t.
10	Hugo Hofstetter (FRA)	Cofidis	s.t.

== Classifications ==
Final general classification

Rank	Rider	Team	Time
1	Alejandro Valverde (ESP)	Movistar Team	16h 14' 53"
2	Luis León Sánchez (ESP)	Astana	+ 14"
3	Jakob Fuglsang (DEN)	Astana	+ 26"
4	Adam Yates (GBR)	Mitchelton–Scott	+ 37"
5	Jesús Herrada (ESP)	Cofidis	+ 48"
6	Primož Roglič (SLO)	LottoNL–Jumbo	+ 49"
7	Pello Bilbao (ESP)	Astana	+ 54"
8	Roman Kreuziger (CZE)	Mitchelton–Scott	+ 57"
9	Kilian Frankiny (SUI)	BMC Racing Team	+ 1' 03"
10	Amaro Antunes (POR)	CCC–Sprandi–Polkowice	+ 1' 09"

Final combined classification

Rank	Rider	Team	Points
1	Thomas Sprengers (BEL)	Sport Vlaanderen–Baloise	56
2	Ibai Salas (ESP)	Burgos BH	100
3	Michał Kwiatkowski (POL)	Team Sky	106
4	Paul Ourselin (FRA)	Direct Énergie	124
5	Mathias Van Gompel (BEL)	Sport Vlaanderen–Baloise	130
6	Jon Ander Insausti (ESP)	Bahrain–Merida	135
7	José Manuel Díaz (ESP)	Israel Cycling Academy	158
8	Jesús Alberto Rubio (ESP)	Inteja Dominican Cycling Team	179

Final mountains classification

Rank	Rider	Team	Points
1	Preben Van Hecke (BEL)	Sport Vlaanderen–Baloise	27
2	Cristián Rodríguez (ESP)	Caja Rural–Seguros RGA	21
3	Alejandro Valverde (ESP)	Movistar Team	20
4	Mathias Van Gompel (BEL)	Sport Vlaanderen–Baloise	17
5	Garikoitz Bravo (ESP)	Euskadi–Murias	17
6	Luis León Sánchez (ESP)	Astana	12
7	Jon Ander Insausti (ESP)	Bahrain–Merida	11
8	Jakob Fuglsang (DEN)	Astana	9
9	Bryan Nauleau (FRA)	Direct Énergie	9
10	Adam Yates (GBR)	Mitchelton–Scott	8

Final young rider classification

Rank	Rider	Team	Time
1	Kilian Frankiny (SUI)	BMC Racing Team	16h 15' 56"
2	Gianni Moscon (ITA)	Team Sky	+ 10"
3	Merhawi Kudus (ERI)	Team Dimension Data	+ 18"
4	Neilson Powless (USA)	LottoNL–Jumbo	+ 52"
5	Matteo Fabbro (ITA)	Team Katusha–Alpecin	+ 1' 01"
6	Steff Cras (BEL)	Team Katusha–Alpecin	+ 3' 20"
7	Alex Aranburu (ESP)	Caja Rural–Seguros RGA	+ 3' 54"
8	Jaime Rosón (ESP)	Movistar Team	+ 4' 24"
9	Aleksandr Vlasov (RUS)	Gazprom–RusVelo	+ 4' 27"
10	Luka Pibernik (SLO)	Bahrain–Merida	+ 4' 33"

Final teams classification

Rank	Team	Time
1	Astana	48h 46' 25"
2	Team Sky	+ 2' 13"
3	BMC Racing Team	+ 2' 29"
4	Mitchelton–Scott	+ 3' 30"
5	AG2R La Mondiale	+ 6' 25"
6	LottoNL–Jumbo	+ 6' 40"
7	Bahrain–Merida	+ 9' 53"
8	Team Katusha–Alpecin	+ 11' 50"
9	CCC–Sprandi–Polkowice	+ 13' 10"
10	Euskadi–Murias	+ 14' 24"
