= Ciclo Cross de Iraeta =

The Ciclo Cross de Iraeta is a cyclo-cross race held in Iraeta, Spain, which was held for the first time in 2007.

== Past winners ==
Year	Winner
2007	Unai Yus (ESP)
2008	Javier Ruiz De Larrinaga (ESP)
