= Pablo Rodríguez (cyclist) =

Spanish cyclist

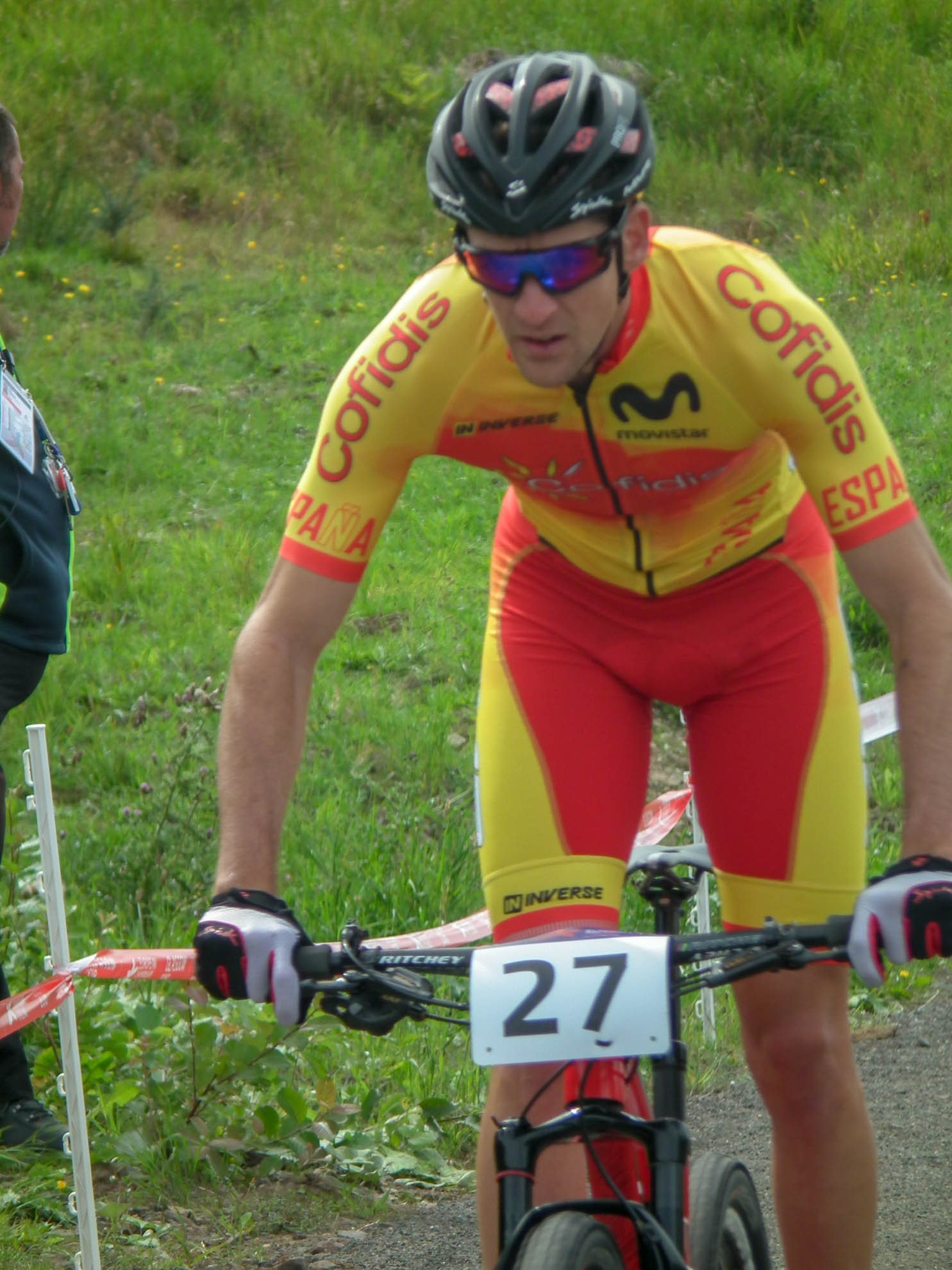
- Rodríguez at the 2018 European Mountain Bike Championships

Personal information
- Full name: Pablo Rodríguez Guede
- Born: 24 June 1993 (age 33) Maceda, Ourense, Spain

Cycling career
- Sport: Cycling
- Current team: BH Coloma Team
- Discipline: Mountain bike
- Role: Rider
- Rider type: Cross-country

Professional teams
- 2013: BH–SR Suntour–KMC
- 2014: MMR Bikes Pro Team
- 2016–2018: MMR Factory Racing Team
- 2019: Primaflor Mondraker Rotor
- 2020–2022: BH Templo Cafes UCC
- 2023–: BH Coloma Team
Medal record
Men's mountain bike racing
Representing Spain
European Championships
Bronze medal – third place	2015 Chies d'Alpago	Under-23 Cross-country

Pablo Rodríguez Guede (born 24 June 1993) is a Spanish cross-country mountain biker, who currently rides for UCI Mountain Bike team BH Coloma Team. He also previously competed in cyclo-cross.

== Major results ==
=== MTB ===
2012
1st Cross-country, National Under-23 Championships
2013
1st Cross-country, National Under-23 Championships
2014
1st Cross-country, National Under-23 Championships
2015
1st Cross-country, European Under-23 Championships
1st Cross-country, National Under-23 Championships
2nd Overall UCI Under-23 XCO World Cup

1st Albstadt
2nd Nové Město
3rd Windham

2016
3rd Vallnord, UCI XCO World Cup
3rd Cross-country, National Championships
2017
2nd Cross-country, National Championships

=== Cyclo-cross ===
2010–2011
1st National Junior Championships
1st Trofeo Ayuntamiento de Muskiz Juniors
1st Asteasuko Juniors
2nd Karrantza Juniors
2nd Medina de Pomar Juniors
2011–2012
1st Trofeo Ayuntamiento de Muskiz Under-23
