= Jofre Cullell =

Spanish cyclist (born 1999)

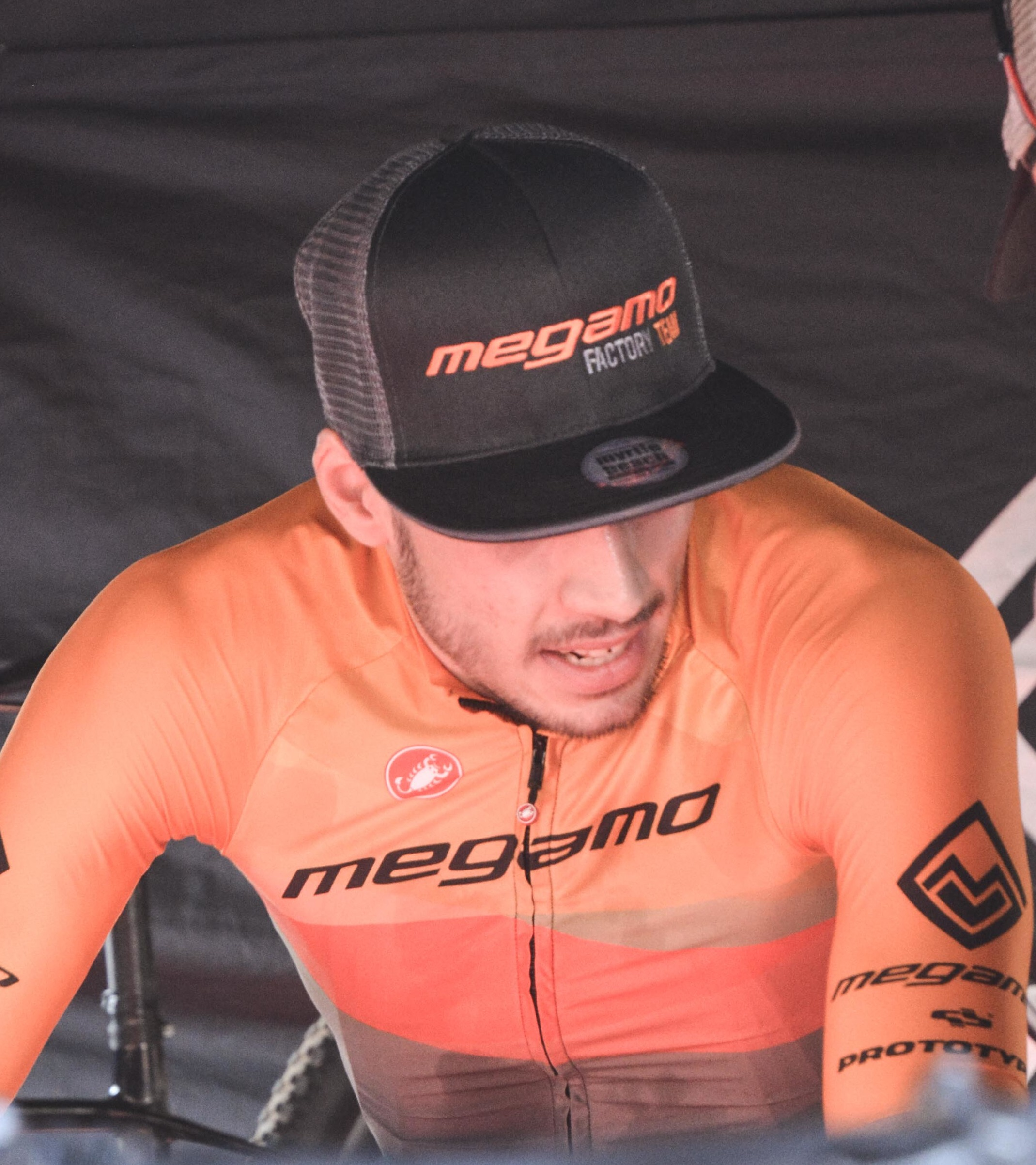

Personal information
- Full name: Jofre Cullell Estapé
- Born: 10 March 1999 (age 27) Santa Coloma de Farners, Spain

Cycling career
- Sport: Cycling
- Disciplines: Mountain bike; Cyclo-cross
- Role: Rider
- Rider type: Cross-country

Jofre Cullell Estapé (born 10 March 1999) is a Spanish cross-country mountain biker and cyclo cross cyclist.

He is from a family of keen cyclists who own a cycle shop in his hometown of Santa Coloma de Farners.

In 2017, Cullell won the European Junior Cross-country Championships. He also finished third overall in the 2019 UCI Under-23 XCO World Cup. He competed in the cross-country race at the delayed 2020 Summer Olympics in August, 2021 where he finished 15th.

== Major results ==
=== Mountain bike ===
2016
1st National Junior XCO Championships
2017
1st European Junior XCO Championships
1st National Junior XCO Championships
2018
1st National Under-23 XCO Championships
2019
1st National Under-23 XCO Championships
3rd Overall UCI Under-23 XCO World Cup
2020
1st National Under-23 XCO Championships
2021
1st National Under-23 XCO Championships

=== Cyclo-cross ===
2015–2016
1st Karrantza Juniors
3rd National Junior Championships
2016–2017
1st Les Franqueses del Valles Juniors
1st Elorrio Juniors
2nd National Junior Championships
Junior DVV Trophy

2nd Baal

Junior Toi Toi Cup

2nd Tábor

2nd Karrantza Juniors
2nd Manlleu Juniors
2017–2018
1st National Under-23 Championships
1st Llodio Under-23
2018–2019
1st Les Franqueses
2nd National Under-23 Championships
2020–2021
2nd National Under-23 Championships
2022–2023
2nd National Championships
