= Jonathan Lastra =

Spanish bicycle racer (born 1993)

Personal information
- Full name: Jonathan Lastra Martínez
- Born: 3 June 1993 (age 33) Bilbao, Spain
- Height: 172 cm (5 ft 8 in)
- Weight: 64 kg (141 lb)

Cycling career
- Sport: Cycling
- Current team: Cofidis
- Disciplines: Road; Cyclo-cross
- Role: Rider

Amateur teams
- 2005–2013: Mendiz Mendi Taldea
- 2014–2015: Caja Rural Amateur

Professional teams
- 2016–2022: Caja Rural–Seguros RGA
- 2023–: Cofidis

Jonathan Lastra Martínez (born 3 June 1993 in Bilbao) is a Spanish cyclist, who currently rides for UCI WorldTeam Cofidis. In August 2018, he was named in the startlist for the Vuelta a España, which was his first Grand Tour.

== Major results ==
=== Road ===
2013
1st Road race, Basque Under–23 Road Championships
2016
10th Coppa Ugo Agostoni
2018
6th Circuito de Getxo
9th Overall Tour of Croatia
10th Grand Prix de Plumelec-Morbihan
2019
1st Clássica da Arrábida
5th Overall Vuelta a Castilla y León
8th GP Miguel Induráin
2021
2nd Clássica da Arrábida
2nd Trofeo Serra de Tramuntana
4th Overall Volta ao Algarve
6th Overall Vuelta a Andalucía
10th Overall Tour of Slovenia
Combativity award Stage 11 Vuelta a España
2022
3rd Overall Vuelta a Castilla y León
4th Overall Troféu Joaquim Agostinho

1st Stage 1

8th Overall CRO Race
8th Overall Volta ao Alentejo
9th Overall Okolo Slovenska
10th Grand Prix du Morbihan

==== Grand Tour general classification results timeline ====
Grand Tour	2018	2019	2020	2021	2022	2023	2024
Giro d'Italia	—	—	—	—	—	—	35
Tour de France	—	—	—	—	—	—	—
Vuelta a España	123	101	61	DNF	—	—	DNF

Legend
—	Did not compete
DNF	Did not finish

=== Cyclo-cross ===
2010–2011
1st Medina de Pomar Juniors
2nd National Junior Championships
3rd Karrantza Juniors
3rd Villarcayo Juniors
3rd Asteasu Juniors
2012–2013
1st National Under-23 Championships
2nd Ispasterko Udala Sari Nagusia
2013–2014
1st National Under-23 Championships
3rd Valencia
