= Grand Prix Ayuntamiento de Ispaster =

The Grand Prix Ayuntamiento de Ispaster is a cyclo-cross race held in Ispaster, Spain.

== Past winners ==
Year	winner
2007	(France) Arnaud Labbe
2006	(Spain) David Seco Amundarain
2005	(Belgium) Wesley Van Der Linden
2004	(Spain) David Seco Amundarain
2003	(Spain) David Seco Amundarain
2002	(Italy) Daniele Pontoni
2001	(France) Christophe Morel
1998	(Spain) David Seco Amundarain
1997	(Spain) Abel Maceira
