= Bizkaiko Bira =

Race details
- Region: Biscay, Spain
- English name: Tour of Biscay
- Discipline: Road
- Type: Stage race

History
- First edition: 1981
- Editions: 29
- Final edition: 2009
- First winner: Julián Gorospe (ESP)
- Most wins: Hans Knauer (GER)
- Final winner: Fabricio Ferrari (URU)

Bizkaiko Bira was a multi-day road cycling race held annually in Biscay, Spain. It was regarded as one of the most prestigious amateur races in the world. Many winners became professional after winning the race including Erik Dekker, Roberto Heras, Igor González de Galdeano and Julián Gorospe.

The race started in 1981 and lasted until 2009. The organizer was the Amorebieta Txirrindulari Elkartea (Cyclist Association of Amorebieta). They also organize the Klasika Primavera cyclist race. In 2005 due to economical problems, they refused to organize the race and Iñaki Barrenetxea Giraldez, a former professional rider took over for the next years. The race was supported by El Correo local newspaper, BBK. In 2010 the race was permanently canceled.

The first winner was the local cyclist Julián Gorospe.

== Major results ==
Year	Winner
1981	(Spain) Julián Gorospe
1982	(Spain) Enrique Aja
1983	(Spain) Manuel Jorge Domínguez
1984	(Germany) Hans Knauer
1985	(Spain) Herminio Díaz Zabala
1986	(Spain) José María Palacín
1987	(Spain) Enrique Alonso
1988	(Netherlands) Louis de Koning
1989	(Australia) Barney Saint Georges
1990	(Spain) Roberto Laiseka
1991	(Germany) Heinrich Trumheller
1992	(Netherlands) Erik Dekker
1993	(Spain) Igor González de Galdeano
1994	(Spain) Juan Carlos Domínguez
1995	(Spain) Roberto Heras
1996	(Spain) José Luis Urdiain
1997	(Spain) Ernesto Manchón
1998	(Italy) Paul Bertino
1999	(Spain) Rubén Oarbeaskoa
2000	(Spain) Patxi Ugarte
2001	(Spain) Juan Fuentes
2002	(Spain) Mikel Elgezabal
2003	(Spain) José Ángel Gómez Marchante
2004	(Spain) David Pérez
2005	(Spain) Diego Gallego
2006	(Spain) David Martín
2007	(Spain) Alberto Fernández
2008	(Spain) Marcos García
2009	(Uruguay) Fabricio Ferrari
