= Ziklokross Igorre =

Cyclo-cross race held in Spain

Race details
- Region: Igorre, Spain
- English name: Cyclo-cross Igorre
- Local name(s): Ziklokross Igorre (in Spanish)
- Discipline: Cyclo-cross
- Competition: UCI Cyclo-cross World Cup

History
- First edition: 1977
- Editions: 44 (as of 2022)
- First winner: José María Yurrebaso (ESP)
- Most wins: Daniele Pontoni (ITA) (6)
- Most recent: Anton Ferdinande (BEL)

The Ziklokross Igorre is a cyclo-cross race held in Igorre, Spain, which was part of the UCI Cyclo-cross World Cup from 2005 to 2011, as well as in 1993, 1994, 1995 and 2001. The race was downgraded to category C2 in 2012, then to amateur status in 2014 and 2015, before being reinstated as a C2 since 2016.

== Past winners ==
In yellow: amateur editions

Year	Winner	Second	Third
1977	(Spain) José María Yurrebaso	(Spain) Iñaki Mayora	(Spain) Ramón Medina
1978	(Switzerland) Peter Haegi	(Belgium) Alfons Van Parijs	(Belgium) Martin De Cock
1979	(Germany) Reimund Dietzen	(Spain) José María Yurrebaso	(Belgium) Peter Haegi
1980	(Spain) Iñaki Mayora	(Spain) José Iñaki Vijandi	(Spain) José María Yurrebaso
1981	(Germany) Klaus-Peter Thaler	(Spain) Iñaki Mayora	(Spain) Francisco Sala
1982	(Switzerland) Gilles Blaser	(Spain) Benito Durán	(Spain) José María Yurrebaso
1983	(Spain) José María Yurrebaso	(Germany) Frank Ommer	(Spain) Iñaki Mayora
1984	(Netherlands) Mathieu Hermans	(Belgium) Paul De Brauwer	(Spain) Francisco Sala
1985	(Switzerland) Albert Zweifel	(Switzerland) Marcel Russenberger	(Spain) José María Yurrebaso
1986	(Switzerland) Albert Zweifel	(Switzerland) Pascal Richard	(Belgium) Paul De Brauwer
1987	(Spain) José María Yurrebaso	(Spain) Francisco Sala	(Belgium) Christian Hautekeete
1988	(Switzerland) Albert Zweifel	(Switzerland) Laurent Dufaux	(Netherlands) Adrie Van der Poel
1989	(Slovakia) Petr Hric	(Switzerland) Pascal Richard	(France) Eric Chanton
1990	(Czech Republic) Stanilav Bambula	(Switzerland) Laurent Dufaux	(Switzerland) Pascal Richard
1991	(Czech Republic) Radovan Fořt	(Czech Republic) Karel Camrda	(Netherlands) Huub Kools
1992	(Italy) Daniele Pontoni	(Czech Republic) Karel Camrda	(Belgium) Peter Van Den Abeele
1993	(Belgium) Paul Herygers	(Belgium) Danny De Bie	(Netherlands) Adrie Van der Poel
1994	(Italy) Daniele Pontoni	(France) Jérôme Chiotti	(Belgium) Paul Herygers
1995	(Italy) Daniele Pontoni	(Italy) Luca Bramati	(Czech Republic) Jiří Pospíšil
1996	(Italy) Daniele Pontoni	(Czech Republic) Ondřej Lukeš	(Czech Republic) Jiří Pospíšil
1997	(Czech Republic) Jiří Pospíšil	(Czech Republic) Ondřej Lukeš	(Czech Republic) Kamil Ausbuher
1998	(Italy) Daniele Pontoni	(Czech Republic) Jiří Pospíšil	(Czech Republic) Petr Dlask
1999	(Switzerland) Beat Wabel	(Spain) David Seco	(Czech Republic) Václav Jezek
2000	(Italy) Daniele Pontoni	(Switzerland) Beat Wabel	(Czech Republic) Jiří Pospíšil
2001	(Belgium) Sven Nys	(Belgium) Bart Wellens	(Belgium) Erwin Vervecken
2002	(Belgium) Mario De Clercq	(Spain) David Seco	(Czech Republic) Jiří Pospíšil
2003	(Czech Republic) Jiří Pospíšil	(Spain) David Seco	(France) John Gadret
2004	(France) Arnaud Labbe	(Spain) David Seco	(Czech Republic) František Klouček
2005	(Belgium) Bart Wellens	(Czech Republic) Petr Dlask	(Italy) Enrico Franzoi
2006	(Belgium) Sven Nys	(Belgium) Bart Wellens	(Belgium) Klaas Vantornout
2007	(Belgium) Sven Nys	(Belgium) Bart Wellens	(Belgium) Klaas Vantornout
2008	(Belgium) Sven Nys	(Belgium) Klaas Vantornout	(Belgium) Erwin Vervecken
2009	(Czech Republic) Zdeněk Štybar	(Belgium) Niels Albert	(Belgium) Sven Nys
2010	(Belgium) Niels Albert	(France) Francis Mourey	(Belgium) Sven Nys
2011	(Belgium) Kevin Pauwels	(Belgium) Sven Nys	(Belgium) Tom Meeusen
2012	(Spain) Aitor Hernández	(Spain) Egoitz Murgoitio	(Spain) Isaac Suárez
2013	(Spain) Aitor Hernández	(Spain) Javier Ruiz de Larrinaga	(Slovakia) Martin Haring
2014	(Spain) Aitor Hernández	(Spain) Javier Ruiz de Larrinaga	(Spain) Kevin Suárez
2015	(Spain) Kevin Suárez	(Spain) Aitor Hernández	(Spain) Ismael Esteban
2016	(Netherlands) Stan Godrie	(Spain) Ismael Esteban	(Italy) Nadir Colledani
2017	(Belgium) Wietse Bosmans	(Spain) Aitor Hernández	(Spain) Javier Ruiz de Larrinaga
2018	(Spain) Javier Ruiz de Larrinaga	(Spain) Aitor Hernández	(Spain) Jon Munitxa
2019	(Spain) Felipe Orts	(Spain) Kevin Suárez	(Spain) Ismael Esteban
2022	(Belgium) Anton Ferdinande	(Spain) Kevin Suárez	(Spain) Gonzalo Inguanzo
