= Kevin Suárez Fernández =

Spanish cyclist

Kevin Suarez Fernandez
Personal information
- Born: 14 June 1994 (age 32) Los Corrales de Buelna (Cantabria)

Cycling career
- Sport: Cycling
- Current team: Nesta–MMR CX Team
- Discipline: Cyclo-cross
- Role: Rider

Amateur teams
- 2013–2014: Bio Racer–BH
- 2015–2017: Gomur–Liébana 2017–Ferroatlántica
- 2018–: Nesta–MMR

Kevin Suarez Fernandez (born 14 June 1994) is a Spanish cyclo-cross cyclist.

== Major results ==
2011–2012
1st National Junior Championships
1st Igorre Juniors
1st Muskiz Juniors
1st Karrantza Juniors
1st CMedina de Pomar Juniors
2012–2013
2nd National Under-23 Championships
2014–2015
1st National Under-23 Championships
1st Igorre
3rd Karrantza
2015–2016
2nd National Championships
3rd Karrantza
2016–2017
2nd National Championships
2nd Trofeo San Andrés
2018–2019
3rd Karrantza
3rd Trofeo San Andrés
2019–2020
2nd National Championships
2nd Igorre
2nd Trofeo San Andres
2nd Manlleu
3rd Overall Copa de España

1st Karrantza
2nd Valencia

2020–2021
2nd National Championships
2nd Overall Copa de España
2nd Valencia
2nd Xàtiva
3rd Sueca
2021–2022
1st Les Franqueses del Vallès
2nd National Championships
2nd Gijon
3rd Overall Copa de España

1st Pontevedra
3rd Karrantza
3rd Llodio

3rd Xaxancx
Coupe de France

3rd Pierric

2022–2023
1st Overall Copa de España

1st Karrantza
1st Gijón
1st Llodio
1st Tarancón
1st Alcobendas

1st Sanxenxo
2nd Igorre
2nd Xaxancx
3rd National Championships
2023–2024
Copa de España

1st Gijón
1st Pontevedra

Coupe de France

1st Quelneuc 1
2nd Quelneuc 2

2nd Xaxancx
3rd Melgaço
2024–2025
Copa de España

1st Marín
1st Gijón

1st Melgaço
