= José Luis Talamillo =

Personal information
- Full name: José Luis Talamillo Huidobro
- Born: 6 July 1933 Burgos, Spain
- Died: 31 December 1965 (aged 32) Burgos, Spain

Cycling career
- Sport: Cycling
- Disciplines: Road; Cyclo-cross
- Role: Rider

Professional teams
- 1957–1959: Boxing Club
- 1960: Brandy Majestad
- 1961: Catigene
- 1962: Gorbea
- 1963–1964: Ferrys
- 1965: Olsa

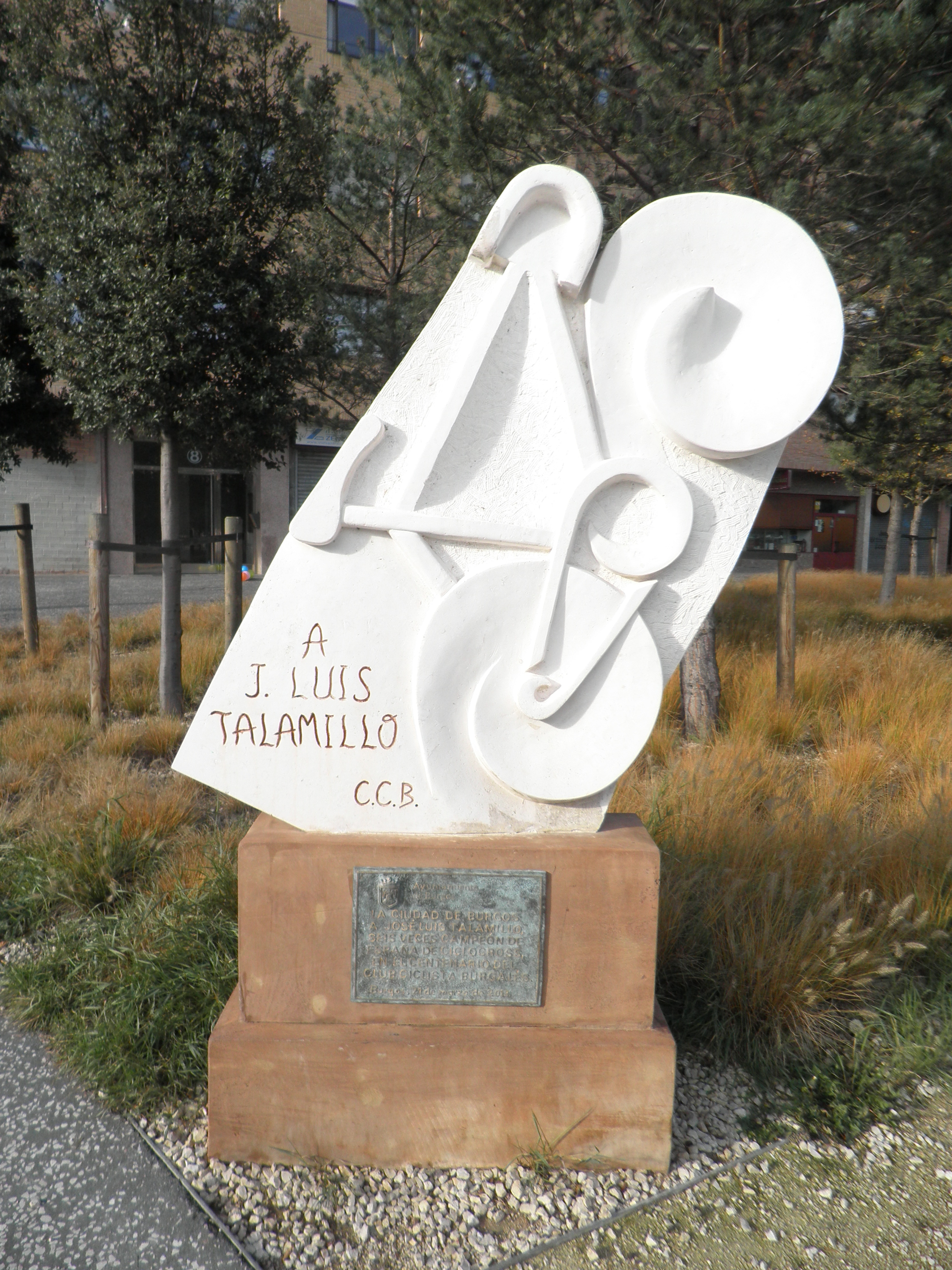
Monument in Burgos to José Luis Talamillo

José Luis Talamillo Huidobro (6 July 1933 – 31 December 1965) was a Spanish cyclist, who competed as a professional from 1957 until 1965.

== Career ==
Talamillo was a professional from 1956 until his death in 1965. As a road cyclist he won, among other things, the GP Villafranca de Ordizia in 1959 and the Setmana Catalana de Ciclisme in 1965. During the 1961 Vuelta a España, Talamillo held the leader's jersey for two days. He also rode in the 1964 Giro d'Italia, finishing 59th overall.

He was also an accomplished cyclo-cross cyclist, and won the Spanish National Cyclo-cross Championships six times. He also finished 8th in the world championships in 1961.

== Death ==
Talamillo was killed in a traffic accident on the road between Burgos and Logroño on December 31, 1965, leaving behind a wife and two children.

== Major results ==
=== Road ===
1957
2nd GP Portugalete
1958
1st Stage 3 Vuelta a La Rioja
1st GP Mugica
2nd GP Villafranca de Ordizia
1959
1st GP Villafranca de Ordizia
1st GP Mugica
2nd GP Llodio
1960
2nd GP Ayutamiento de Bilbao
5th Subida a Arrate
1961
4th Campeonato Vasco Navarro de Montaña
8th Overall Euskal Bizikleta
1962
1st Stage 1 Vuelta a La Rioja
2nd Subida al Naranco
1964
2nd Road race, National Road Championships
1965
1st Overall Setmana Catalana de Ciclisme
2nd Gran Premio Fedrácion Catalana de Ciclismo
3rd Overall Euskal Bizikleta
3rd Trofeo Juan Fina
4th Subida al Naranco

=== Cyclo-cross ===
1955–1956
3rd National Championships
1957–1958
1st National Championships
1958–1959
1st National Championships
1959–1960
1st National Championships
10th UCI World Championships
1960–1961
2nd National Championships
8th UCI World Championships
1961–1962
1st National Championships
1962–1963
1st National Championships
1964–1965
1st National Championships
