= Jokin Mújika =

Spanish cyclist

Personal information
- Full name: Jokin Mújika Aramburu
- Born: 22 August 1962 (age 64) Itsasondo, Guipúzcoa, Spain
- Height: 1.78 m (5 ft 10 in)
- Weight: 73 kg (161 lb)

Cycling career
- Sport: Cycling
- Disciplines: Road; Cyclo-cross
- Role: Rider

Professional teams
- 1984–1989: Orbea–Danena
- 1990–1991: Banesto
- 1992: Artiach–Royal

Jokin Mújika Aramburu (born 22 August 1962) is a former professional road cyclist and cyclocross-racer from Spain.

== Career achievements ==
=== Major results ===
Road

- Stage 2, Vuelta a Galega 1984
- Stage 7, Tour de l'Avenir 1986
- General classification, Vuelta a Galega 1987
- General classification, Stage 3, Bicicleta Eibarresa 1988
- 1st, Clásica a los Puertos 1989

Cyclo-cross

- Spanish National Cyclo-cross Championships champion, Elite, 1993
- Spanish National Cyclo-cross Championships champion, Elite, 1994
- Llodio, Cyclocross 1994
- Spanish champion, Elite, 1996

=== Grand Tour general classification results timeline ===
	1984	1985	1986	1987	1988	1989	1990
Tour de France		45	30	41	63	78	
Giro d'Italia				11		19	
Vuelta a España	49	43	76		14		62
