= 1992 Tour de Suisse =

Race details
- Dates: 17–26 June 1992
- Stages: 10
- Distance: 1,797 km (1,117 mi)
- Winning time: 47h 00' 02"

Results
	Winner	Giorgio Furlan (ITA)	(Ariostea)
	Second	Gianni Bugno (ITA)	(Gatorade–Chateau d'Ax)
	Third	Fabian Jeker (SUI)	(Helvetia–Commodore)

The 1992 Tour de Suisse was the 56th edition of the Tour de Suisse cycle race and was held from 17 June to 26 June 1992. The race started in Dübendorf and finished in Zürich. The race was won by Giorgio Furlan of the Ariostea team.

== General classification ==
Final general classification

Rank	Rider	Team	Time
1	Giorgio Furlan (ITA)	Ariostea	47h 00' 02"
2	Gianni Bugno (ITA)	Gatorade–Chateau d'Ax	+ 31"
3	Fabian Jeker (SUI)	Helvetia–Commodore	+ 1' 01"
4	Greg LeMond (USA)	Z	+ 1' 31"
5	Beat Zberg (SUI)	Helvetia–Commodore	+ 1' 40"
6	Heinrich Trumheller (GER)	Helvetia–Commodore	+ 2' 00"
7	Erik Breukink (NED)	PDM–Ultima–Concorde	+ 2' 05"
8	Éric Boyer (FRA)	Z	+ 2' 26"
9	Heinz Imboden (SUI)	Subaru–Montgomery	+ 2' 37"
10	Eddy Bouwmans (NED)	Panasonic–Sportlife	+ 2' 37"
