= David Lozano =

Spanish cyclist

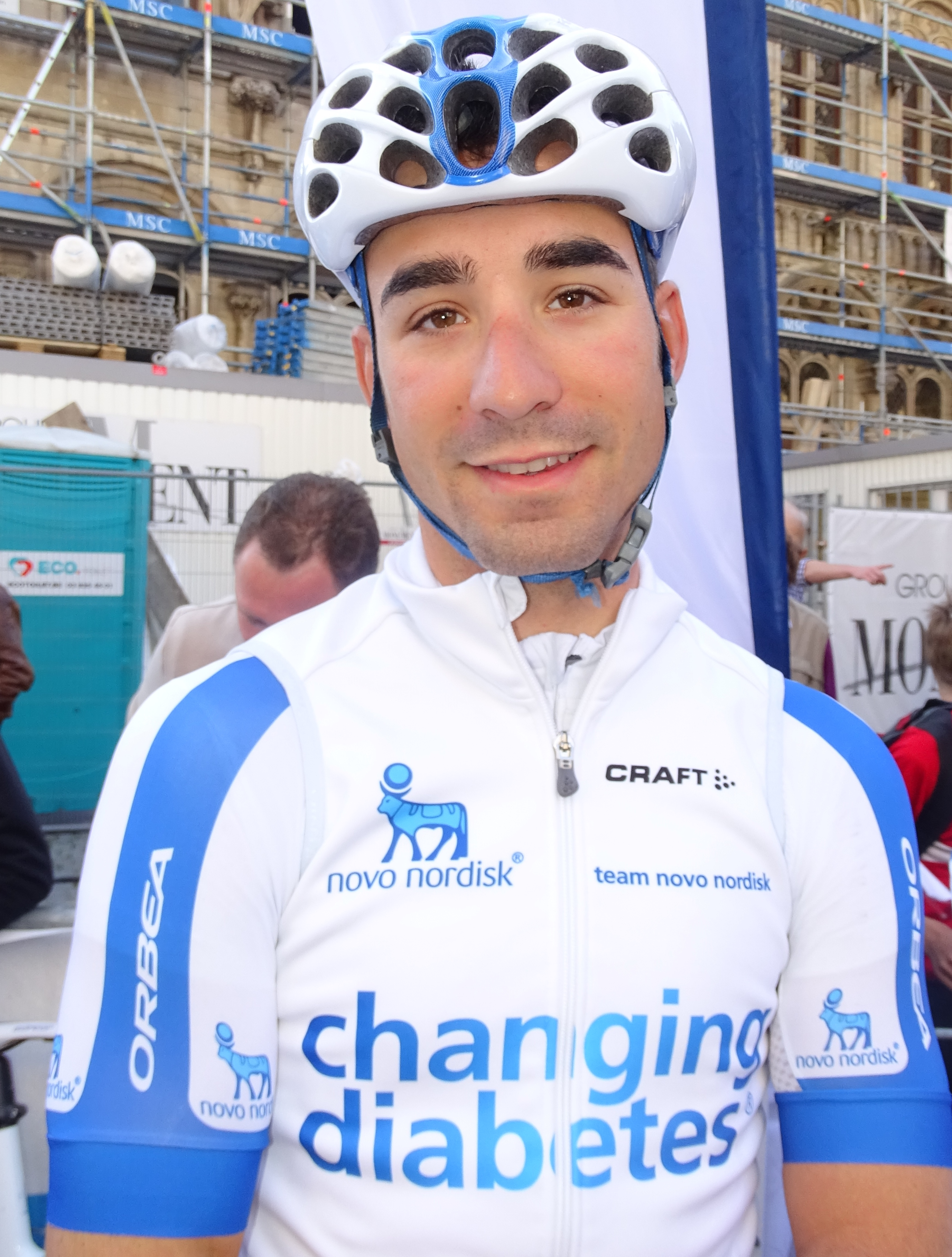
- David Lozano in 2015

Personal information
- Full name: David Lozano Riba
- Born: 21 December 1988 (age 37) Terrassa, Spain
- Height: 1.78 m (5 ft 10 in)
- Weight: 63 kg (139 lb)

Cycling career
- Sport: Cycling
- Current team: Team Novo Nordisk
- Disciplines: Road; Mountain biking; Cyclo-cross
- Role: Rider

Amateur teams
- 2007–2008: MSC Bikes (MTB)
- 2009: Cemelorca–Trek–Lorca Taller del Tiempo
- 2010–2012: Esteve Bicicletas
- 2012: Team Type 1–Sanofi (stagiaire)

Professional team
- 2013–: Team Novo Nordisk

David Lozano Riba (born 21 December 1988) is a Spanish professional racing cyclist, who currently rides for UCI ProTeam Team Novo Nordisk.

== Major results ==
=== Cyclo-cross ===
2005–2006
1st Junior National Championships
2006–2007
1st Under–23 National Championships
2007–2008
1st Under–23 National Championships
2008–2009
1st Under–23 National Championships
2009–2010
1st Under–23 National Championships
2013–2014
1st Sant Joan Despí
1st Torroella de Montgrí
1st Sant Celoni
1st Reus

=== Mountain biking ===
2007
1st Under–23 National Cross-country Championships
2009
1st Under–23 National Cross-country Championships
2010
1st Under–23 National Cross-country Championships

=== Road ===
2018
5th Overall Tour of Rwanda

1st Stage 7

5th Overall Tour of Estonia
2019
6th Overall Tour of Rwanda
8th Overall Tour of Taiyuan

1st Mountains classification

2022
10th Overall South Aegean Tour
