= Kilian Frankiny =

Swiss cyclist (born 1994)

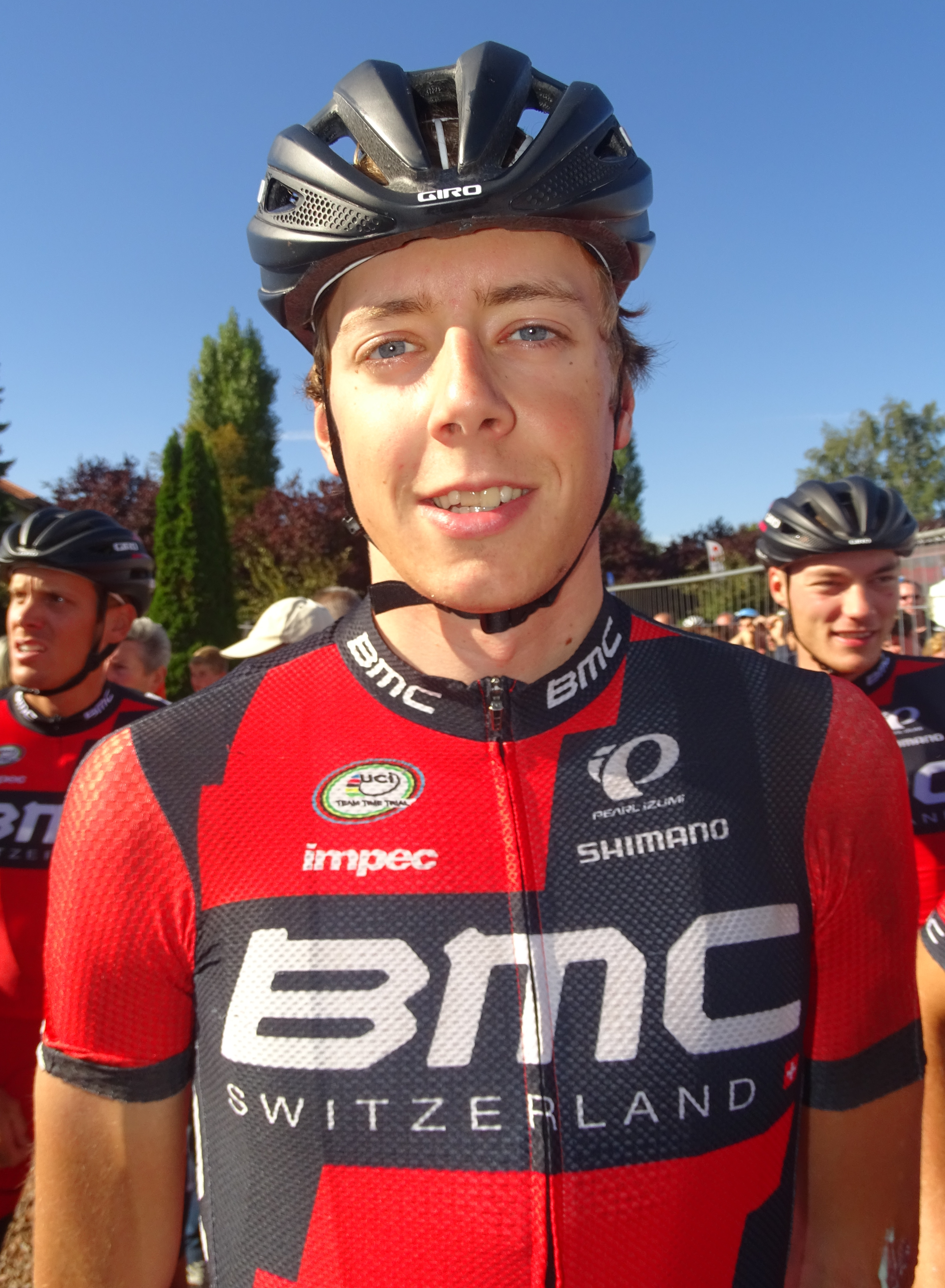
- Frankiny in 2015.

Personal information
- Full name: Kilian Frankiny
- Nickname: Kili
- Born: 26 January 1994 (age 32) Reckingen, Switzerland
- Height: 1.88 m (6 ft 2 in)
- Weight: 68 kg (150 lb)

Cycling career
- Sport: Cycling
- Current team: Retired
- Discipline: Road
- Role: Rider
- Rider type: Climber

Amateur team
- 2013–2016: BMC Development Team

Professional teams
- 2015: BMC Racing Team (stagiaire)
- 2017–2018: BMC Racing Team
- 2019–2020: Groupama–FDJ
- 2021: Team Qhubeka Assos

Major wins
- Grand Tours Vuelta a España 1 TTT stage (2017)

Kilian Frankiny (born 26 January 1994 in Reckingen) is a Swiss former cyclist, who competed as a professional from 2017 to 2021. He was named in the startlist for the 2017 Vuelta a España. In May 2018, he was named in the startlist for the 2018 Giro d'Italia.

== Major results ==
2015
4th Overall Giro della Valle d'Aosta
2016
1st Overall Giro della Valle d'Aosta

1st Stages 1 (TTT) & 4

3rd Overall Peace Race U23
7th Overall Tour de l'Ain
2017
1st Stage 1 (TTT) Vuelta a España
1st Stage 2 (TTT) Volta a Catalunya
3rd Road race, National Road Championships
2018
9th Overall Volta a la Comunitat Valenciana

1st Young rider classification
1st Stage 3 (TTT)

2019
6th Overall Tour du Haut Var
7th Trofeo Laigueglia

=== Grand Tour general classification results timeline ===
Grand Tour	2017	2018	2019	2020	2021
Giro d'Italia	—	43	—	77	57
Tour de France	—	—	—	—	—
Vuelta a España	DNF	—	21	—	—

Legend
—	Did not compete
DNF	Did not finish
