= José Michelena =

Argentine footballer

José Antonio Michelena (born September 1, 1988) is an Argentine professional footballer who plays as a winger.

== Career ==
Michelena was born in Río Chico, Río Negro, Argentina.

- Cruz del Sur 2006–2008
- 9 de Julio (M) 2008–2009
- Cruz del Sur 2009
- Huracán de Tres Arroyos 2010–2011
- Racing de Olavarría 2011
- Real Potosí 2012
- Huracán de Tres Arroyos 2012–2013
- Deportivo Madryn 2014–2017
- Deportivo Lara 2017
- Juventud Unida Universitario 2018–2019
- Deportivo Madryn 2019–2023
- Club Cipolletti 2023–2024
