= Heinrich Trumheller =

German cyclist (born 1972)

Personal information
- Born: 1 July 1972 (age 54) Nalchik, USSR

Cycling career
- Sport: Cycling
- Current team: Retired
- Discipline: Road
- Role: Rider

Amateur team
- 1991: Helvetia–La Suisse (stagiaire)

Professional teams
- 1992: Helvetia–Fichtel & Sachs
- 1993–1994: Castorama
- 1995: Team Telekom
- 1997: Schauff–Öschelbronn
- 1998: Team EC Bayer Worringen
- 1999: Die Continentale–Olympia
- 2000: Team Nürnberger

Heinrich Trumheller (born 1 July 1972) is a German former racing cyclist. He won the German National Road Race Championships in 1992.

== Major results ==
1991
1st Overall Okolo Slovenska
1st Overall Bizkaiko Bira
1992
1st Road race, National Road Championships
2nd Wartenberg Rundfahrt
5th Coppa Placci
6th Overall Tour de Suisse
8th Overall Critérium International
9th Giro di Romagna
1993
3rd Monte Carlo–Alassio
4th Overall Tour de l'Avenir
6th Japan Cup Cycle Road Race
7th Classique des Alpes
1994
7th Overall Circuit Cycliste Sarthe
1997
1st Stage 6 Tour du Loir-et-Cher
1st Stage 5 Sachsen Tour
3rd Rund um Düren
1998
1st Internationale Ernst-Sachs-Tour
1999
5th Rund um Düren
10th Overall Rheinland-Pfalz Rundfahrt
2000
1st Stage 3 Sachsen Tour
9th GP de Villers-Cotterêts
