= José María Yurrebaso =

Spanish cyclist

Personal information
- Full name: José María Yurrebaso Goienetxe
- Born: 11 October 1955 (age 71) Urretxu, Spain

Cycling career
- Sport: Cycling
- Disciplines: Cyclo-cross; Road
- Role: Rider

Professional teams
- 1979: Novostil-Helios
- 1980: Henninger-Aquila Rossa
- 1981–1982: Hueso Chocolates–Manzaneque–Monver
- 1983–1985: Teka
- 1986–1987: Seat–Orbea
- 1988–1989: Caldeyf Construciones
- 1990–1992: Lotus–Festina

Major wins
- Grand Tours Vuelta a España 1 individual stage (1981)

José María Yurrebaso Goienetxe (born 11 October 1955) is a Spanish former racing cyclist. Professional from 1979 to 1992, he won a stage of the 1981 Vuelta a España as well as the Spanish National Cyclo-cross Championships three times.

== Major results ==
1977
1st Ziklokross Igorre
1979
1st National Cyclo-cross Championships
1981
1st Stage 8a Vuelta a España
1982
2nd National Cyclo-cross Championships
1983
1st Ziklokross Igorre
3rd National Cyclo-cross Championships
1984
2nd National Cyclo-cross Championships
1985
2nd National Cyclo-cross Championships
2nd Gran Premio lnternacional Camping de Zarauz
1986
2nd National Cyclo-cross Championships
1987
1st Ziklokross Igorre
1st Cyclocross Azpeitia
1988
3rd National Cyclo-cross Championships
1989
1st National Cyclo-cross Championships
2nd Cyclocross Azpeitia
1990
1st National Cyclo-cross Championships
1st Cross-country, National Mountain Bike Championships
