= Aitor Hernández =

Spanish cyclist

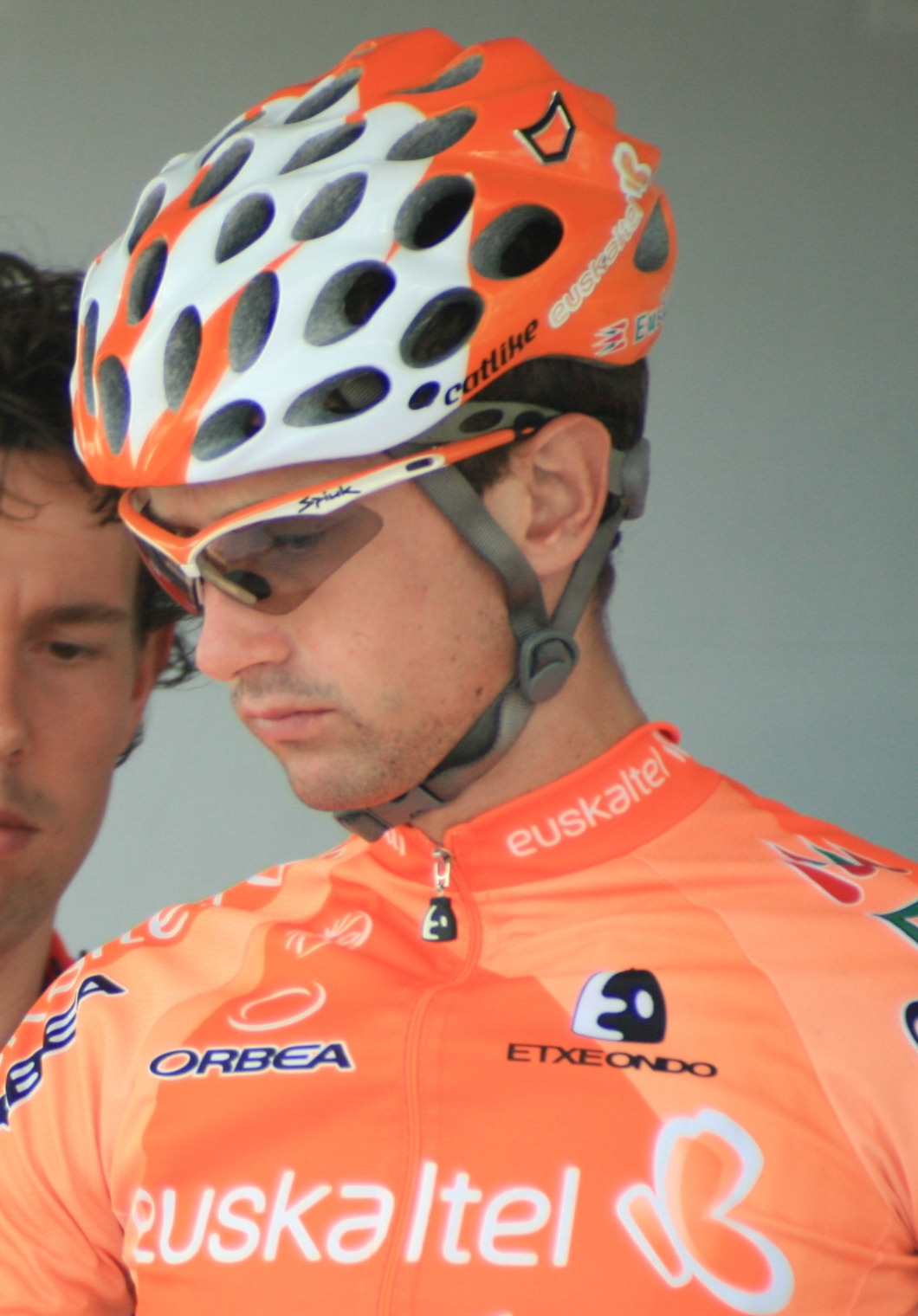

Personal information
- Full name: Aitor Hernández Gutiérrez
- Born: 24 January 1982 (age 44) Ermua, Basque Country, Spain

Cycling career
- Sport: Cycling
- Disciplines: Road; Cyclo-cross
- Role: Rider
- Rider type: Climber

Professional teams
- 2004–2005: LPR–Piacenza
- 2006–2010: Euskaltel–Euskadi

Aitor Hernández Gutiérrez (born 24 January 1982) is a Spanish road and cyclo-cross cyclist.

== Major results ==
=== Cyclo-cross ===
1997–1998
3rd National Junior Championships
2001–2002
3rd National Under-23 Championships
2010–2011
2nd Ispasterko Udala Sari Nagusia
2011–2012
2nd Ispasterko Udala Sari Nagusia
2nd Asteasuko Ziklo-Krossa
2012–2013
1st National Championships
1st Igorre
1st Karrantza
1st Valencia
1st Ispasterko Udala Sari Nagusia
2nd Asteasuko Ziklo-Krossa
2013–2014
1st Igorre
1st Karrantza
1st Valencia
2nd National Championships
3rd Ispasterko Udala Sari Nagusia
2014–2015
1st National Championships
1st Karrantza
1st Valencia
2015–2016
1st Karrantza
2016–2017
1st Trofeo Joan Soler
3rd Basqueland Ziklokrosa
3rd Asteasuko Ziklo-krosa
3rd Gran Premi Les Franqueses del Valles
3rd Trofeo Ayuntamiento de Muskiz
3rd Laudio
2017–2018
2nd Trofeo Joan Soler
2nd Elorrioko Basqueland Ziklokrosa
3rd National Championships
3rd Karrantza
3rd Laudio
3rd Valencia
3rd Trofeo San Andres
2018–2019
3rd Elorrioko Basqueland Ziklokrosa

=== Road ===
2004
10th Giro delle Colline del Chianti
2005
9th Overall Euskal Bizikleta
2006
Tour de France

Combativivity award Stage 20

2007
1st Mountains classification, Vuelta al País Vasco
2009
Vuelta a España

Held for Stage 5

2010
8th Overall Tour du Haut Var

==== Grand Tour general classification results timeline ====
Grand Tour	2006	2007	2008	2009
Giro d'Italia	—	DNF	—	—
Tour de France	134	—	—	—
Vuelta a España	—	81	—	96

Legend
—	Did not compete
DNF	Did not finish
