= Iñaki Barrenetxea =

Spanish cyclist

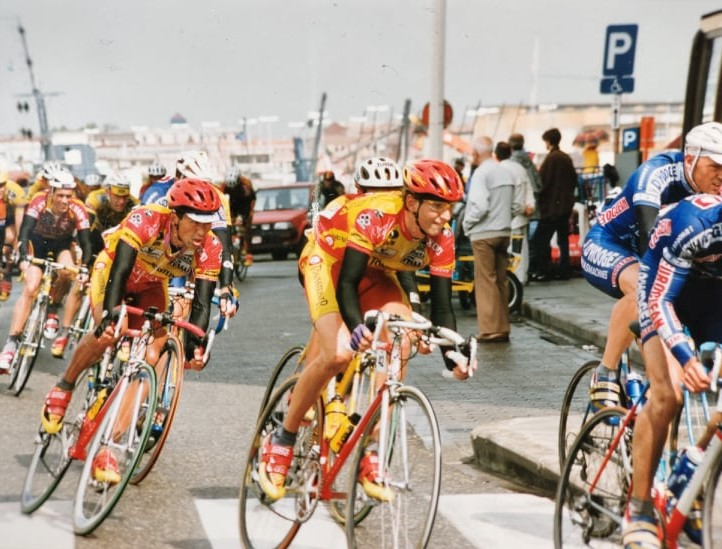
- Iñaki Barrenetxea in a race. Ostende, 1997.

Personal information
- Full name: Iñaki Barrenetxea Giraldez
- Born: 28 November 1973 (age 52) Bilbao, Spain

Cycling career
- Sport: Cycling
- Current team: Retired
- Discipline: Road
- Role: Rider

Professional teams
- 1997–1998: Tönissteiner–Colnago
- 1999: Fuenlabrada

Iñaki Barrenetxea Giraldez (born 28 November 1973, Bilbao, Basque Country) is a Basque former professional road racing cyclist, who after his professional career turned jury in races and organizer of Bizkaiko Bira. In his amateur years he was part of the Base selection and joined Ripolin Bondex team having as a director Joxean Fernandez Matxin and teammates Oscar Freire and David Seco.

His father was the president of Bizcay Cyclist Federation and his younger brother, Asier, is also a cyclist.

== Major results ==
1993

1st Bilbao

1994
3rd Villasana de Mena
1995
3rd Clásica Memorial Txuma
1996
1st Berango (Criterium)
