= Ismael Esteban =

Spanish cyclist (born 1983)

Personal information
- Full name: Ismael Esteban Agüero
- Born: 16 September 1983 (age 43) Torrelavega, Spain

Cycling career
- Sport: Cycling
- Disciplines: Cyclo-cross; Road; Gravel
- Role: Rider

Amateur team
- 2008–2009: Cafés Baqué

Ismael Esteban Agüero (born 16 September 1983 in Torrelavega) is a Spanish cyclo-cross cyclist. He competed in the men's elite event at the 2016 UCI Cyclo-cross World Championships in Heusden-Zolder.

== Major results ==
=== Cyclo-cross ===
2004–2005
1st National Under-23 Championships
2005–2006
1st National Under-23 Championships
2015–2016
3rd National Championships
3rd Les Franqueses del Valles
2016–2017
1st National Championships
1st Overall Copa de España de Ciclocross
1st Elorrio
1st Asteasuko
1st Trofeo San Andres
1st Les Franqueses del Valles
1st Laudio
2nd Igorre
2nd Karrantza
2nd Manlleu
2017–2018
1st National Championships
1st Les Franqueses del Valles
3rd Abadiano
2018–2019
1st Karrantza
1st Xativa
2nd National Championships
3rd Abadiano
2019–2020
1st Overall Copa de España de Ciclocross

1st Pontevedra

2nd Karrantza
2nd Laudio
2nd Les Franqueses del Vallès
2nd Xativa
2nd Abadiano
3rd Ziklokross Igorre
3rd Vic
3rd Trofeo San Andres
2020–2021
3rd National Championships
2021–2022
1st Alcobendas

=== Road ===
2005
1st Stage 4 Vuelta Ciclista a Navarra
2006
1st Overall Vuelta a Tenerife

1st Stage 2

=== Gravel ===
2023
UCI World Series

2nd La Indomable
3rd Limburg
