= Premio San Román Muxika =

The Premio San Román Muxika is a cyclo-cross race held in Muxika, Spain.

== Past winners ==
Year	winner
2007	(Spain) Isaac Suarez Fernandez
2006	(Spain) David Seco Amundarain
2005	(Spain) Isaac Suarez Fernandez
2004	(Spain) David Seco Amundarain
2003	(Spain) David Seco Amundarain
2002	(Spain) David Seco Amundarain
2001	(Spain) David Seco Amundarain
