= Derby Cyclo-cross Series =

The Derby Cyclo-cross Series are a cyclo-cross race held in Derby, England, for the first time in 2007. The race held a January date between 2007 and 2009 and was not held in 2010. In 2011, the race returned for men only with a November date.

== Past winners ==
Year	Men's winner	Women's winner
2007	Philip Dixon (GBR)	Isla Rowntree (GBR)
2008	Ian Bibby (GBR)	Annie Last (GBR)
2009	Jody Crawforth (GBR)	Suzanne Clarke (GBR)
2011	Jelle Brackman (BEL)	
