= Javier Ruiz de Larrinaga =

Spanish racing cyclist

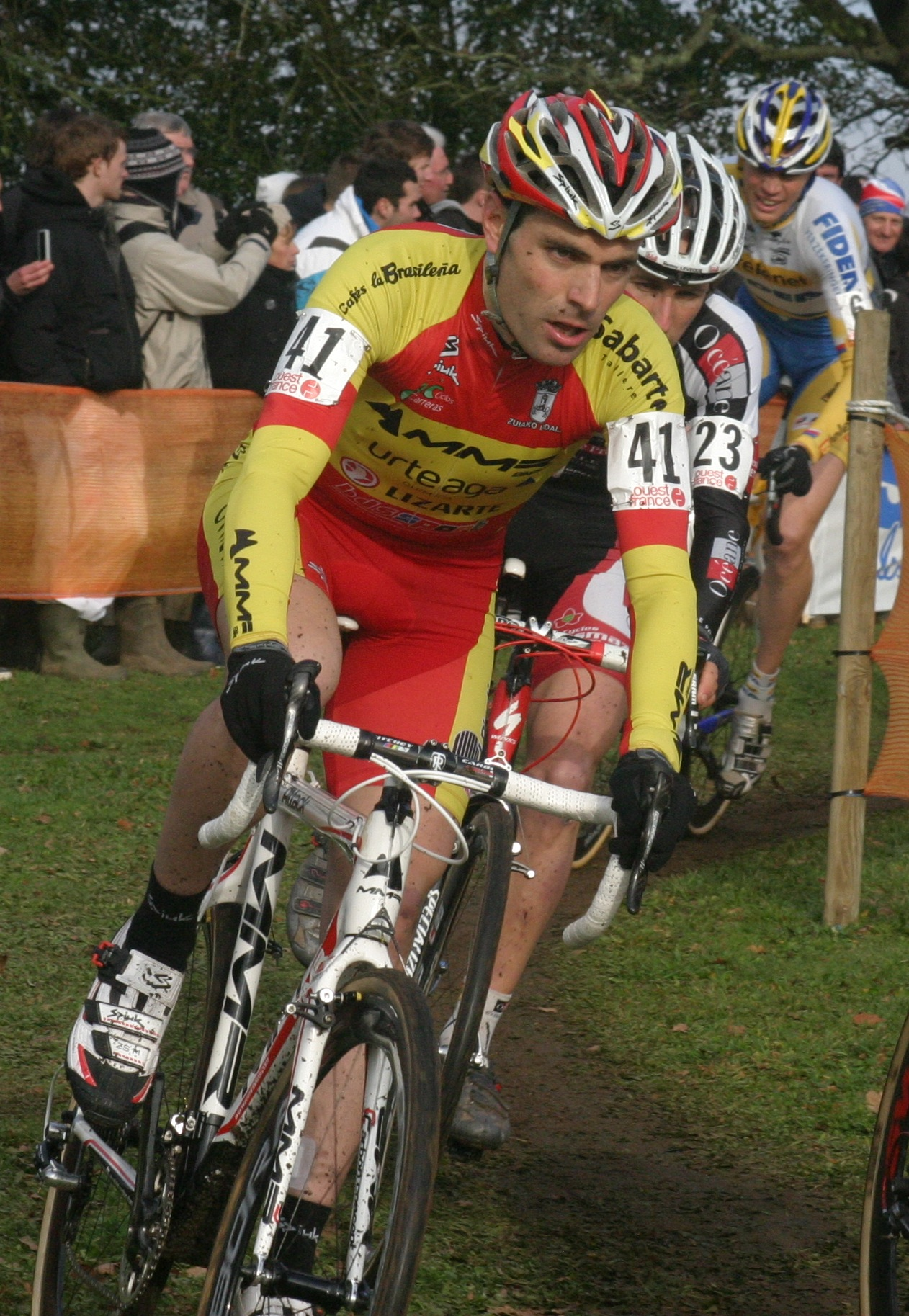

Personal information
- Full name: Javier Ruiz de Larrinaga Ibañez
- Born: 2 November 1979 (age 46) Amézaga de Zuya, Spain

Cycling career
- Sport: Cycling
- Disciplines: Cyclo-cross; Road
- Role: Rider

Amateur teams
- 2001–2002: Olarra–Ercoreca
- 2003: Orbea–Olarra–Consultec
- 2004: Caja Rural–Uno
- 2007–2017: Lizarte
- 2018–2019: MMR–Spiuk CX

Professional teams
- 2005–2006: Kaiku
- 2009–2015: Spiuk

Javier Ruiz De Larrinaga Ibañez (born 2 November 1979 in Amézaga de Zuya) is a Spanish racing cyclist, who last rode for the MMR–Spiuk CX team.

== Major results ==
=== Cyclo-cross ===
2007–2008
1st Cyclo-cross de Karrantza
1st Elorrioko Ziklokrosa Basqueland
2008–2009
1st National Championships
1st Cyclo-cross de Karrantza
1st Ciclocross de Medina de Pomar
2009–2010
1st National Championships
2010–2011
1st National Championships
1st Valladolid
2012–2013
3rd National Championships
2013–2014
1st National Championships
2nd Ziklokross Igorre
2014–2015
2nd Ziklokross Igorre
2015–2016
1st National Championships
2016–2017
1st Cyclo-cross de Karrantza
2017–2018
1st Trofeo San Andrés
3rd Ziklokross Igorre
2018–2019
1st Ziklokross Igorre
3rd National Championships

=== Road ===
2002
1st Stage 4 Vuelta a Navarra
2003
3rd Overall Vuelta a Cantabria
