= Diego Gallego =

Personal information
- Full name: Diego Gallego Arnáiz
- Born: 9 June 1982 (age 44) Burgos, Spain

Cycling career
- Sport: Cycling
- Current team: Retired
- Discipline: Road
- Role: Rider; Directeur sportif

Amateur team
- 2003–2005: Cropusa–Burgos

Professional team
- 2006–2011: Viña Magna–Cropu

Managerial team
- 2012–2015: Burgos BH–Castilla y Leon

Diego Gallego Arnáiz (born 9 June 1982 in Burgos) is a Spanish former road cyclist. After retiring from cycling, he worked as a directeur sportif for Burgos BH–Castilla y Leon from 2012 until 2015.

== Major results ==
2004
8th Overall Volta a Lleida
2005
2nd Overall Circuito Montañes

1st Stage 6

2nd Overall Vuelta Ciclista a León
7th Clásica Memorial Txuma
2006
4th Overall Circuito Montañes
5th Overall Vuelta a Navarra
2007
1st Stage 5 Cinturón a Mallorca
4th Overall Tour des Pyrénées
9th Overall Vuelta a Extremadura
2008
3rd Clásica a los Puertos
2010
9th GP Llodio
