= Jon Ander Insausti =

Spanish cyclist

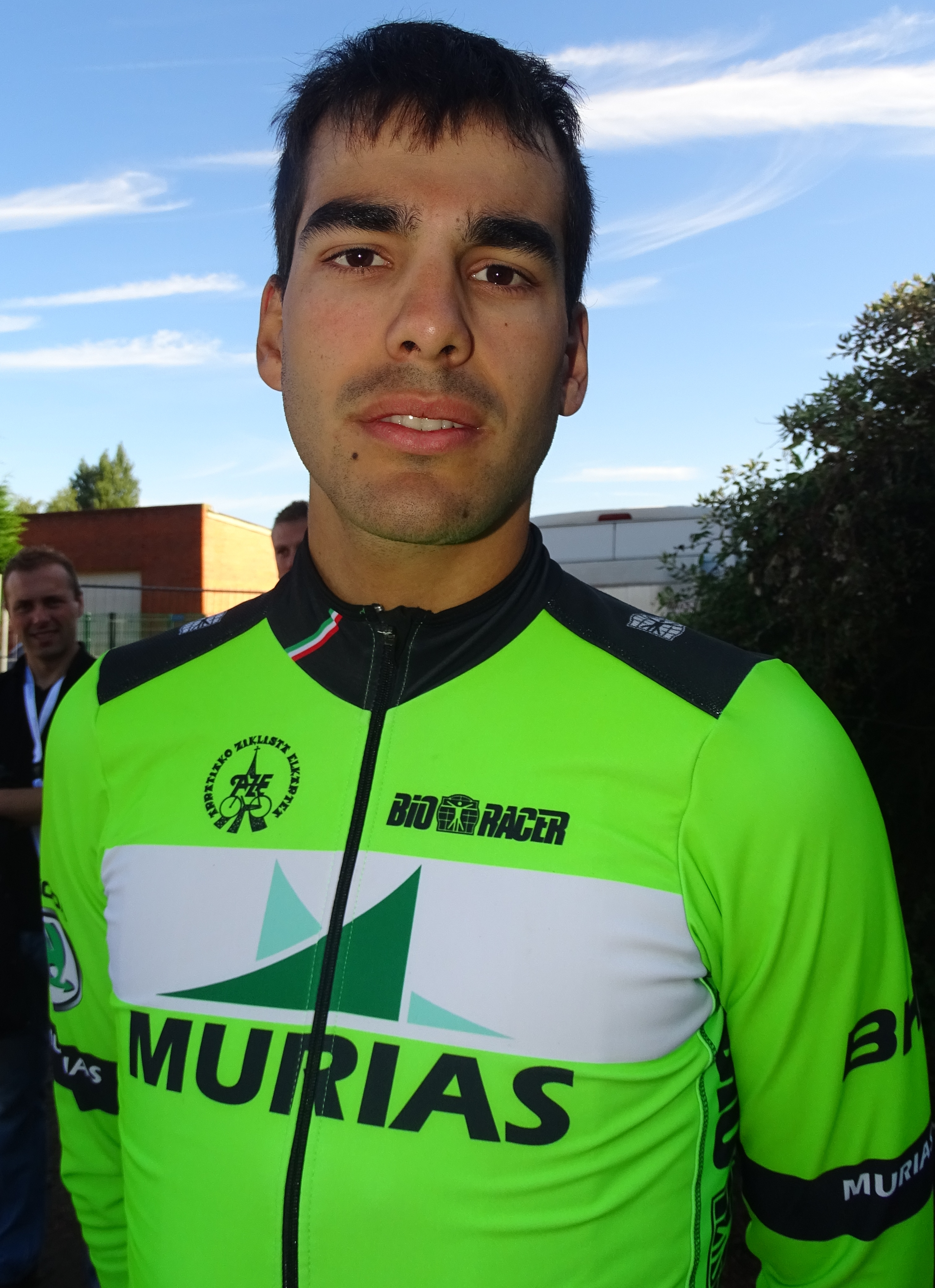
- Insausti in 2015.

Personal information
- Full name: Jon Ander Insausti Irastorza
- Born: 13 December 1992 (age 33) Mutiloa, Spain
- Height: 1.87 m (6 ft 2 in)
- Weight: 89 kg (196 lb)

Cycling career
- Sport: Cycling
- Current team: Retired
- Discipline: Road
- Role: Rider
- Rider type: Time Trialist

Professional teams
- 2015–2016: Murias Taldea
- 2017: Bahrain–Merida
- 2018: Fundación Euskadi

Jon Ander Insausti Irastorza (born 13 December 1992 in Mutiloa) is a Spanish former professional road cyclist.

== Major results ==
=== Cyclo-cross ===
2009–2010
1st Junior race, National Championships
2010–2011
1st Under-23 race, National Championships

=== Road ===
2012
1st Time trial, Basque Country Under-23 Road Championships
2013
1st Time trial, Basque Country Road Championships
2014
1st Time trial, Basque Country Under-23 Road Championships
2015
2nd Cholet-Pays de Loire
2017
1st Stage 8 Tour of Japan
