= Río Chico, Río Negro =

Coordinates: 41°43′S 70°30′W

Río Chico
- Municipality and village
- Interactive map of Río Chico
- Country: Argentina
- Province: Río Negro Province
- Time zone: UTC−3 (ART)
- Climate: Csb

Río Chico is a village and municipality in Río Negro Province in Argentina.

== Climate ==
Climate data for Río Chico, Río Negro (1976–1994)
Month	Jan	Feb	Mar	Apr	May	Jun	Jul	Aug	Sep	Oct	Nov	Dec	Year
Record high °C (°F)	35.0 (95.0)	35.5 (95.9)	34.0 (93.2)	28.0 (82.4)	23.0 (73.4)	22.0 (71.6)	18.0 (64.4)	23.0 (73.4)	25.0 (77.0)	29.0 (84.2)	32.0 (89.6)	33.0 (91.4)	35.5 (95.9)
Mean daily maximum °C (°F)	24.6 (76.3)	24.3 (75.7)	20.9 (69.6)	15.1 (59.2)	9.9 (49.8)	7.7 (45.9)	7.0 (44.6)	9.4 (48.9)	12.1 (53.8)	15.7 (60.3)	20.0 (68.0)	22.7 (72.9)	15.8 (60.4)
Daily mean °C (°F)	17.1 (62.8)	17.1 (62.8)	14.2 (57.6)	10.0 (50.0)	6.3 (43.3)	3.7 (38.7)	3.4 (38.1)	4.9 (40.8)	7.2 (45.0)	9.4 (48.9)	13.3 (55.9)	15.5 (59.9)	10.2 (50.4)
Mean daily minimum °C (°F)	7.3 (45.1)	7.1 (44.8)	4.9 (40.8)	2.4 (36.3)	−0.1 (31.8)	0.5 (32.9)	−1.2 (29.8)	−0.8 (30.6)	0.2 (32.4)	1.5 (34.7)	4.2 (39.6)	6.3 (43.3)	2.7 (36.9)
Record low °C (°F)	−3.0 (26.6)	−5.0 (23.0)	−8.0 (17.6)	−13.0 (8.6)	−15.0 (5.0)	−21.0 (−5.8)	−22.0 (−7.6)	−14.0 (6.8)	−19.5 (−3.1)	−13.0 (8.6)	−8.0 (17.6)	−5.0 (23.0)	−22.0 (−7.6)
Average precipitation mm (inches)	3.6 (0.14)	12.0 (0.47)	5.8 (0.23)	10.5 (0.41)	20.1 (0.79)	16.1 (0.63)	13.1 (0.52)	8.9 (0.35)	8.0 (0.31)	5.2 (0.20)	6.1 (0.24)	7.8 (0.31)	117.2 (4.61)
Average rainy days	0.8	1.5	1.3	1.9	4.0	3.1	3.1	2.1	1.8	1.8	1.6	1.5	24.5
Source: Instituto Nacional de Tecnología Agropecuaria
