= Mathias Van Gompel =

Belgian cyclist

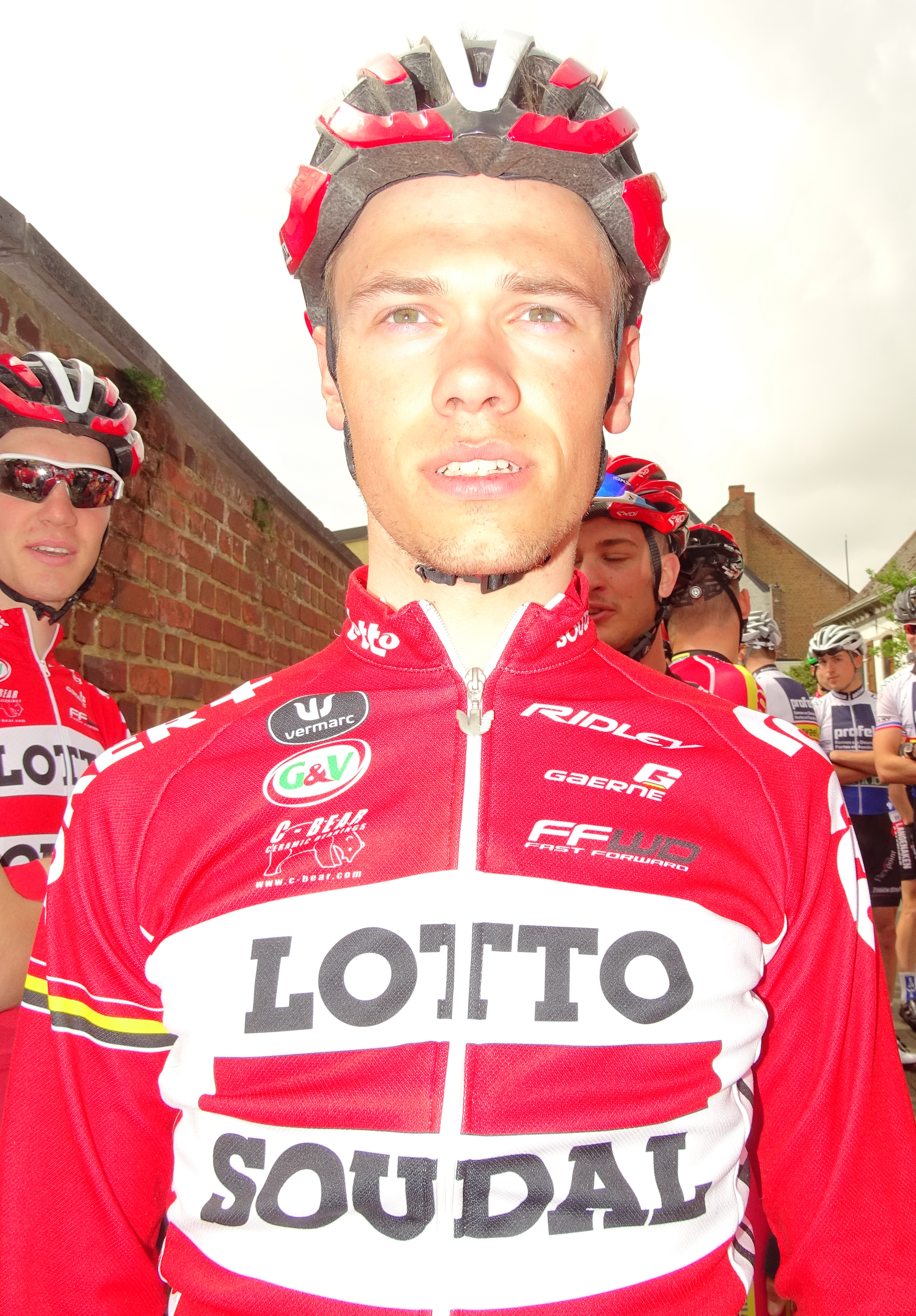
- Van Gompel in 2015.

Personal information
- Full name: Mathias Van Gompel
- Born: 24 September 1995 (age 31) Meerhout, Belgium

Cycling career
- Sport: Cycling
- Discipline: Road
- Role: Rider

Amateur team
- 2014–2017: Lotto–Soudal U23

Professional teams
- 2017: Lotto–Soudal (stagiaire)
- 2018–2019: Sport Vlaanderen–Baloise

Mathias Van Gompel (born 24 September 1995 in Meerhout) is a Belgian cyclist, who last rode for UCI Professional Continental team Sport Vlaanderen–Baloise.

== Major results ==
2013
1st Grand Prix Bati-Metallo
1st La Philippe Gilbert
3rd Road race, UEC European Junior Road Championships
2017
4th Omloop Het Nieuwsblad Beloften
6th Internationale Wielertrofee Jong Maar Moedig
2018
8th Münsterland Giro
