= Mutiloa =

- Municipality
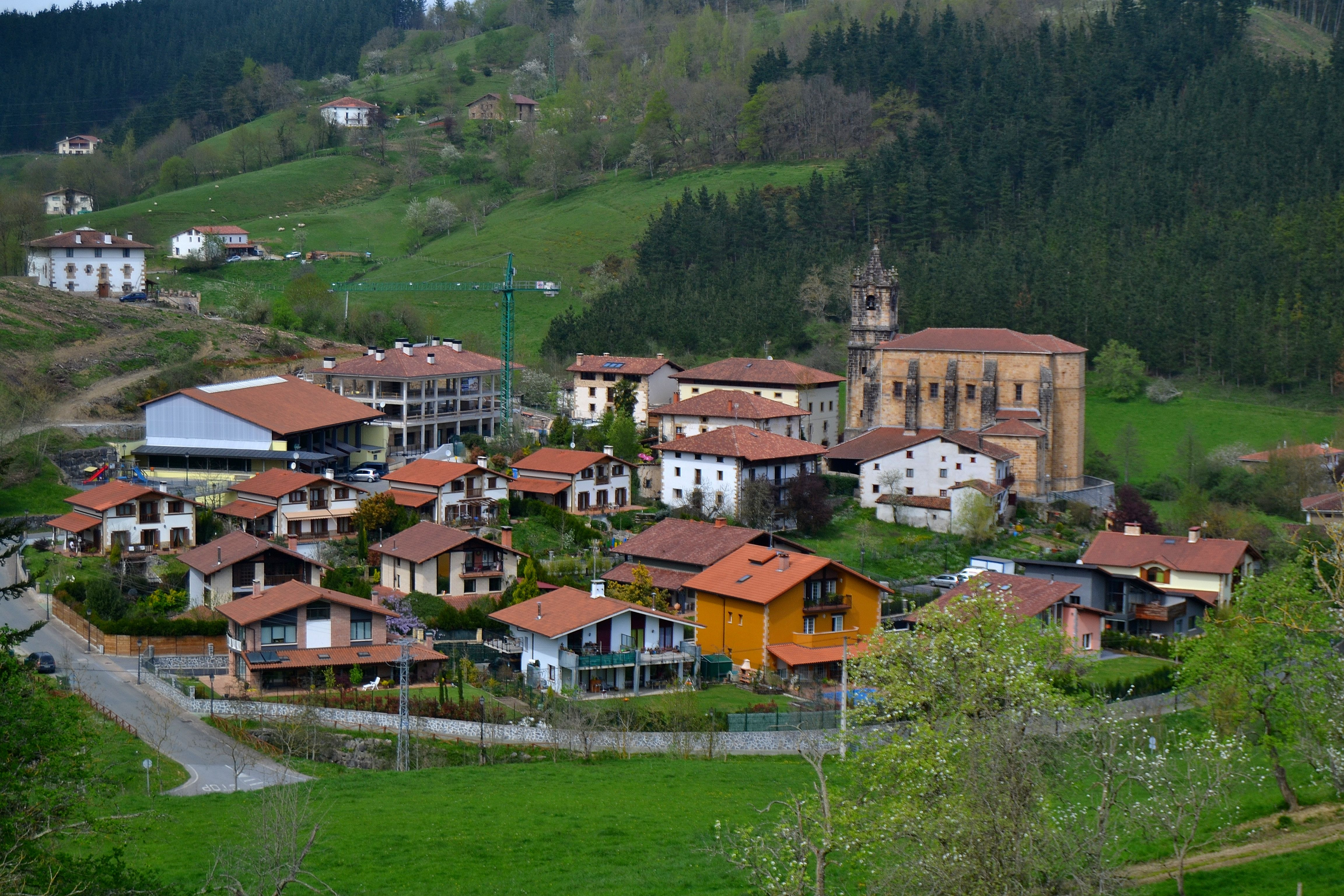
- Mutiloa

- Coat of arms

- Location of Mutiloa within the Basque Country Location of Mutiloa within Spain
- Coordinates: 43°01′19″N 2°16′22″W
- Country: Spain
- Autonomous Community: Basque Country
- Province: Gipuzkoa
- Comarca: Goierri

Government
  - Mayor: Iñaki Ugalde Alustiza

Area
  - Total: 9 km^{2} (3.5 sq mi)
- Elevation (AMSL): 239 m (784 ft)

Population (2025-01-01)
  - Total: 261
  - Density: 29/km^{2} (75/sq mi)
- Time zone: UTC+1 (CET)
  - Summer (DST): UTC+2 (CEST (GMT +2))
- Postal code: 20214
- Area code: +34 (Spain) + 94 (Biscay)

Mutiloa is a town and municipality located in the Goierri region of the province of Gipuzkoa, in the autonomous community of the Basque Country, northern Spain.
