= Flüüger Quer Dübendorf =

Swiss cyclo-cross race

The Flüüger Quer Dübendorf is a cyclo-cross race held in Dübendorf, Switzerland.

== Past winners ==
Year	Men's winner
2007	Simon Zahner (SUI)
2008	Christian Heule (SUI)
2009	Simon Zahner (SUI)
