= Cyclo-cross de Karrantza =

Annual cycling competition in Spain

Race details
- Date: October/November
- Region: Karrantza, Spain
- English name: Cyclo-cross Karrantza
- Local name(s): Karrantzako ziklo-krosa (in Basque)
- Discipline: Cyclo-cross

History
- First edition: 2003
- Editions: 20 (as of 2023)
- First winner: Haitz Ortiz (ESP)
- Most wins: Aitor Hernández (ESP) (2 wins)
- Most recent: Gonzalo Inguanzo (ESP)

The Cyclo-cross de Karrantza is a cyclo-cross race held annually in Karrantza, Spain, which is rated as a C2 event on the UCI calendar.

== Past winners ==
Year	Winner	Second	Third
2003	(Spain) Haitz Ortiz	(Spain) Sem Mújika	(Spain) Fernando Fernández
2004	(Spain) David Seco	(Spain) José Antonio Díez	(Spain) Ismael Esteban
2005	(Spain) David Seco	(Spain) José Antonio Díez	(Spain) Santiago Armero
2006	(Spain) Unai Yus	(Spain) José Antonio Díez	(Spain) Erlantz Uriarte
2007	(Spain) Javier Ruiz de Larrinaga	(Spain) David Seco	(Spain) Unai Yus
2008	(Spain) Javier Ruiz de Larrinaga	(Spain) Isaac Suárez	(Spain) José Antonio Díez
2009	(Spain) Isaac Suárez		
2010	(Spain) Egoitz Murgoitio	(Spain) Isaac Suárez	(Spain) Erlantz Uriarte
2011	(Spain) Egoitz Murgoitio	(Spain) Javier Ruiz de Larrinaga	(Belgium) Bart Hofman
2012	(Spain) Aitor Hernández	(Spain) Javier Ruiz de Larrinaga	(France) Flavien Dassonville
2013	(Spain) Aitor Hernández	(Spain) Javier Ruiz de Larrinaga	(Spain) Aketza Peña
2014	(Spain) Aitor Hernández	(Spain) Javier Ruiz de Larrinaga	(Spain) Kevin Suárez
2015	(Spain) Aitor Hernández	(Spain) Felipe Orts	(Spain) Kevin Suárez
2016	(Spain) Javier Ruiz de Larrinaga	(Spain) Ismael Esteban	(Spain) Felipe Orts
2017	(Belgium) Vincent Baestaens	(Spain) Felipe Orts	(Spain) Aitor Hernández
2018	(Spain) Ismael Esteban	(Spain) Felipe Orts	(Spain) Kevin Suárez
2019	(Spain) Kevin Suárez	(Spain) Ismael Esteban	(Belgium) Dieter Vanthourenhout
2020	Cancelled		
2021	(Netherlands) David van der Poel	(Belgium) Lander Loockx	(Spain) Kevin Suárez
2022	(Spain) Kevin Suárez	(Belgium) Anton Ferdinande	(France) Cyprien Gilles
2023	(Spain) Gonzalo Inguanzo	(Spain) Mario Junquera	(Spain) Raul Mira
