= José Antonio Díez =

Spanish cyclist

Personal information
- Born: 13 August 1982 (age 44) Spain

Cycling career
- Sport: Cycling
- Discipline: Cyclo-cross
- Role: Rider

José Antonio Díez Arriola (born 13 August 1982) is a Spanish professional racing cyclist. He won several nation cyclo-cross races. On the international level he competed between 2011 and 2013 five times in a UCI Cyclo-cross World Cup race, with 34th place as best result.

== Career highlights ==
2003
1st in Zeberio, Cyclo-cross (ESP)

2004
1st in Camp de Mirra, Cyclo-cross (ESP)

2005
1st in Medina de Pomar, Cyclo-cross (ESP)
1st in Polanco, Cyclo-cross (ESP)

2006
1st in Rasines, Cyclo-cross (ESP)
1st in Asterria, Cyclo-cross (ESP)
1st in Treto, Cyclo-cross (ESP)
1st in Ermua, Cyclo-cross (ESP)
1st in Rada, Cyclo-cross (ESP)
1st in Solares, Cyclo-cross (ESP)
1st in Ramales, Cyclo-cross (ESP)
