= David Seco =

Spanish cyclist

Personal information
- Born: David Seco Amundarain; 17 March 1973 (age 53) Busturia, Spain

Cycling career
- Sport: Cycling
- Disciplines: Cyclo-cross, road racing

Professional team
- 1990s: Ripolin Bondex

David Seco Amundarain (born March 17, 1973) is a Spanish professional racing cyclist. Although he is known as a cyclo cross racer he also race road. He was part of Ripolin Bondex team in the 90s. He was on the same team as Óscar Freire and Iñaki Barrenetxea, both professionals later on.

Seco retired in 2011 with over 100 victories.

== Career highlights ==
1989
2nd in National Championship, Cyclo-cross, Debutants, Spain, Llanes (ESP)

1995
1st in Vedra Cyclocross (ESP)
2nd in Leioa, Cyclo-cross (ESP)
3rd in Durana, Cyclo-cross (ESP)

1996
1st in Leioa, Cyclo-cross (ESP)
1st in Durana, Cyclo-cross (ESP)
1st in Artxanda, Cyclo-cross (ESP)
1st in Telleriarte, Cyclo-cross (ESP)
2nd in National Championship, Cyclo-cross, Elite, Spain, Telleriarte (ESP)

1997
2nd in Ispaster, Cyclo-cross (ESP)
2nd in National Championship, Cyclo-cross, Elite, Spain, Ispaster (ESP)
3rd in Durana, Cyclo-cross (ESP)

1998
1st in Urnieta, Cyclo-cross (ESP)
1st in Astarria, Cyclo-cross (ESP)
1st in Amorebieta, Cyclo-cross (ESP)
1st in Ispaster, Cyclo-cross (ESP)
2nd in Kortezubi-Gernika, Cyclo-cross (ESP)
2nd in Durana, Cyclo-cross (ESP)
2nd in Villena, Cyclo-cross (ESP)
3rd in National Championship, Cyclo-cross, Elite, Spain, Los Carrales de Buelna (ESP)

1999
1st in Ispaster, Cyclo-cross (ESP)
1st in Zamora, Cyclo-cross (ESP)
1st in Durana, Cyclo-cross (ESP)
1st in Pontevedra, Cyclo-cross (ESP)
1st in Elorrio, Cyclo-cross (ESP)
1st in GP Navidad, Cyclo-cross (ESP)
1st in Asteasu, Cyclo-cross (ESP)
2nd in Nottingham, Cyclo-cross (GBR)
2nd in Igorre, Cyclo-cross (ESP)
3rd in National Championship, Cyclo-cross, Elite, Spain (ESP)

2000
1st in National Championship, Cyclo-cross, Elite, Spain (ESP)
1st in Agullent, Cyclo-cross (ESP)
1st in Astarria, Cyclo-cross (ESP)
1st in Elorrio, Cyclo-cross (ESP)
2nd in Vizcaya Ermua, Cyclo-cross (ESP)
3rd in Durana, Cyclo-cross (ESP)

2001
1st in Asteasu, Cyclo-cross (ESP)
1st in National Championship, Cyclo-cross, Elite, Spain, Noja (ESP)
1st in Guernica, Cyclo-cross (ESP)
1st in Ermua, Cyclo-cross (ESP)
1st in Elorrio, Cyclo-cross (ESP)
1st in Itsasondo, Cyclo-cross (ESP)
3rd in Ispaster, Cyclo-cross (ESP)

2002
1st in National Championship, Cyclo-cross, Elite, Spain (ESP)
1st in Guernica, Cyclo-cross (ESP)
1st in Itsasondo, Cyclo-cross (ESP)
2nd in Lekeitio, Cyclo-cross (ESP)
2nd in Drongen-Baarle Cyclocross (BEL)
2nd in Igorre, Cyclo-cross (ESP)

2003
1st in Asteasu, Cyclo-cross (ESP)
1st in National Championship, Cyclo-cross, Elite, Spain, Sotrondio (ESP)
1st in Abadino, Cyclo-cross (ESP)
1st in Muxika, Cyclo-cross (ESP)
1st in Idiazabal, Cyclo-cross (ESP)
1st in Ispaster, Cyclo-cross (ESP)
1st in Ermua, Cyclo-cross (ESP)
1st in Elorrio, Cyclo-cross (ESP)
1st in Itsasondo, Cyclo-cross (ESP)
2nd in Igorre, Cyclo-cross (ESP)

2004
1st in Vera de Bidasoa (ESP)
1st in National Championship, Cyclo-cross, Elite, Spain (ESP)
1st in Abadino, Cyclo-cross (ESP)
1st in Muxika, Cyclo-cross (ESP)
1st in Ispaster, Cyclo-cross, Ispaster (ESP)
1st in Karrantza, Cyclo-cross (ESP)
1st in La Morgal, Cyclo-cross (ESP)
1st in Santiago, Cyclo-cross (ESP)
1st in Arnao, Cyclo-cross (ESP)
1st in Montjuic, Cyclo-cross (ESP)
1st in Ermua, Cyclo-cross (ESP)
1st in Valladolid, Cyclo-cross (ESP)
1st in Elorrio, Cyclo-cross (ESP)
2nd in Asteasu, Cyclo-cross (ESP)
2nd in Igorre, Cyclo-cross (ESP)
3rd in Itsasondo, Cyclo-cross (ESP)

2005
1st in Zeberio, Cyclo-cross (ESP)
1st in Astesasu, Cyclo-cross (b) (ESP)
1st in Karrantza, Cyclo-cross (ESP)
1st in Lugones, Cyclo-cross (ESP)
1st in Astarria, Cyclo-cross (ESP)
1st in Zeberio, Cyclo-cross (b) (ESP)
1st in Bermeo, Cyclo-cross (ESP)
1st in Elorrio, Cyclo-cross (ESP)
1st in Legutiano, Cyclo-cross (ESP)
2nd in National Championship, Cyclo-cross, Elite, Spain, Busturia (ESP)
3rd in Muxika, Cyclo-cross (ESP)
3rd in Asteasu, Cyclo-cross (ESP)

2006
1st in Oviedo, Cyclo-cross (ESP)
1st in National Championship, Cyclo-cross, Elite, Spain, Ribadumia (ESP)
1st in Muxika, Cyclo-cross (ESP)
1st in Ispaster, Cyclo-cross (ESP)

2007
1st in Vilafranca del Penedés, Cyclo-cross (ESP)
1st in Alginet, Cyclo-cross (ESP)
1st in Ametzaga de Zuyo, Cyclo-cross (ESP)
1st in Amezaga, Cyclo-cross (ESP)
1st in Astarria, Cyclo-cross (ESP)
1st in Bermeo, Cyclo-cross (ESP)
2nd in Karrantza, Cyclo-cross (ESP)
2nd in Valencia, Cyclo-cross (ESP)
3rd in Solares, Cyclo-cross (ESP)

2008
1st in Ramales, Cyclo-cross (ESP)
