= 2022–23 UCI Cyclo-cross season =

Bicycle racing competition

Details
- Dates: 13 August – 26 February 2023
- Location: World

The calendar for the 2022–2023 men's and women's cyclo-cross season includes cyclo-cross races starting on 13 August 2022, and ending in February 2023. The individual events are classified into five categories. The highest category includes the world cup events (CDM), which gives rise to a ranking. Behind them, we find the C1 and C2 category races, which award points are for the world ranking, then the races reserved for those under 23, also called hopes (category CU) and finally the races for juniors (category CJ) . There are also national championships (NC) which are organized in about thirty countries.

== Men ==
=== September ===
Date	Course	Class	Winner	Team	References
18 September 2022	(Belgium) Exact Cross Trophy #1 Polderscross, Kruibeke	C2	Michael Vanthourenhout (BEL)	Pauwels Sauzen–Bingoal	
25 September 2022	(Switzerland) Radcross Illnau, Illnau-Effretikon	C2	Kevin Kuhn (SUI)	Tormans CX Team	
25 September 2022	(France) Cyclo-cross international de Boulzicourt Ardennes, Boulzicourt	C2	Clément Venturini (FRA)	AG2R Citroën Team	
25 September 2022	(Belgium) Exact Cross Trophy #2 Beringen	C2	Eli Iserbyt (BEL)	Pauwels Sauzen–Bingoal	

=== October ===
Date	Course	Class	Winner	Team	References
1 October 2022	(Belgium) Exact Cross Trophy #3, Berencross, Meulebeke	C2	Michael Vanthourenhout (BEL)	Pauwels Sauzen–Bingoal	
7 October 2022	(United States) Trek Cup, Waterloo	C1	Lars van der Haar (NED)	Baloise–Trek Lions	
9 October 2022	(Estonia) Bike Fanatics Keila CX Day 2, Keila	C2	Madis Mihkels (EST)	Team Ampler-Tartu2024	
9 October 2022	(France) Brumath Cross Days, Brumath	C2	Diether Sweeck (BEL)	Credishop-Fristads	
9 October 2022	(Spain) CicloCross XaxanCX–2022, Marín	C2	Ryan Kamp (NED)	Pauwels Sauzen–Bingoal	
12 October 2022	(Spain) CicloCross Internacional Lago de As Pontes, As Pontes de García Rodríguez	C2	Felipe Orts (ESP)	Burgos BH	
14 October 2022	(United States) OZ Cross, Fayetteville	C1	Lander Loockx (BEL)	Deschacht–Hens–Maes	11
15 October 2022	(Spain) CicloCross Internacional Concello de Ribadumia, Ribadumia	C2	Felipe Orts (ESP)	Burgos BH	
16 October 2022	(Republic of Ireland) Verge Cross Clonmel, Clonmel	C2	Toby Barnes (GBR)	WiV SunGod	
16 October 2022	(Spain) III CicloCross Internacional Con da Romaiña–Concello de Sanxenxo, Sanxenxo	C2	Kevin Suárez Fernández (ESP)	Nesta-MMR CX Team	
16 October 2022	(Switzerland) Internationales Radquer Steinmaur, Steinmaur	C2	Kevin Kuhn (SUI)	Tormans CX Team	
20 October 2022	(Belgium) Kermiscross, Ardooie	C2	Quinten Hermans (BEL)	Tormans CX Team	
22 October 2022	(United States) Kings CX Day 1, Mason	C1	Andrew Dillman (USA)	Ignition Racing	
23 October 2022	(United States) Kings CX Day 2, Mason	C2	Andrew Dillman (USA)	Ignition Racing	
29 October 2022	(Italy) International Cyclocross Increa Brugherio, Brugherio	C2	Federico Ceolin (ITA)	Team Beltrami TSA - Tre Colli	
29 October 2022	(United States) Major Taylor Cross Cup – Day 1, Indianapolis	C2	Caleb Swartz (USA)	Giant Bicycles US	
30 October 2022	(United States) Major Taylor Cross Cup – Day 2, Indianapolis	C2	Scott Funston (USA)	Blue Competition Cycles p/b Build	

=== November ===
Date	Course	Class	Winner	Team	References
1 November 2022	(Belgium) X²O Badkamers Trophy #1, Koppenbergcross, Oudenaarde	C1	Lars van der Haar (NED)	Baloise–Trek Lions	
1 November 2022	(France) Cyclo-cross International de Dijon, Dijon	C2	Loris Rouiller (SUI)	Cross Team Legendre	
1 November 2022	(Italy) 2e Trofeo Citta' di Firenze, Florence	C2	Davide Toneatti (ITA)	Astana Qazaqstan Development Team	
1 November 2022	(Spain) Elorrioko Basqueland Ziklokrosa, Elorrio	C1	Cancelled		
4 November 2022	(Costa Rica) 2022 Pan American Cyclo-cross Championships, San José	CC	Eric Brunner (USA)	Blue Stages Racing	
6 November 2022	(Belgium) 2022 UEC European Cyclo-cross Championships, Namur	CC	Michael Vanthourenhout (BEL)	Pauwels Sauzen–Bingoal	
12 November 2022	(United States) The Northampton International – Day 1, Northampton	C2	Eric Brunner (USA)	Blue Stages Racing	
13 November 2022	(France) Cyclo-cross Auxerre, Auxerre	C2	Joshua Dubau (FRA)	Rockrider Racing Team	
13 November 2022	(Japan) Rapha Supercross Nobeyama, Nagano	C2	Hijiri Oda (JPN)	YowamushiPedal Cycling Team	
13 November 2022	(United States) The Northampton International – Day 2, Northampton	C2	Eric Brunner (USA)	Blue Stages Racing	
19 November 2022	(United Kingdom) Andover Supercross, Andover	C2	Toby Barnes (GBR)	WiV SunGod	
19 November 2022	(United States) North Carolina Grand Prix – Day 1, Hendersonville	C2	Kerry Werner (USA)	Kona Maxxis Shimano	
20 November 2022	(Japan) Kansai Cyclo Cross Biwako Grand Prix, Kusatsu	C2	Hijiri Oda (JPN)	YowamushiPedal Cycling Team	
20 November 2022	(United States) North Carolina Grand Prix – Day 2, Hendersonville	C2	Kerry Werner (USA)	Kona Maxxis Shimano	
26 November 2022	(Belgium) X²O Badkamers Trophy #2, Kortrijk	C2	Tom Pidcock (GBR)	INEOS Grenadiers	
26 November 2022	(France) Cyclo-cross de Gernelle, Gernelle	C2	Marcel Meisen (GER)	Stevens Bikes Hamburg	
26 November 2022	(Italy) Gran Premio Val Fontanabuona, San Colombano Certenoli	C2	Federico Ceolin (ITA)	Beltrami TSA–Tre Colli	
27 November 2022	(Canada) Bear Crossing Grand Prix, Langford	C2	Evan Russell (CAN)		
27 November 2022	(France) Cyclo-cross de La Grandville, La Grandville	C2	Joshua Dubau (FRA)	Rockrider Racing Team	
27 November 2022	(Spain) VIII Abadiñoko Udala Saria, Abadiño	C2	Cancelled		

=== December ===
Date	Course	Class	Winner	Team	Reference
4 December 2022	(Italy) 38^ GP Città di Vittorio Veneto, Vittorio Veneto	C2	Marcel Meisen (GER)	Stevens Bikes Hamburg	
8 December 2022	(Italy) Ciclocross del Ponte, Faè	C2	Gioele Bertolini (ITA)	Selle Italia Guerciotti Elite	
10 December 2022	(Belgium) Exact Cross Trophy #4, Robotland Cyclocross, Essen	C2	Gerben Kuypers (BEL)	Proximus - Alphamotorhomes - Doltcini CT	
11 December 2022	(Italy) Gran Premio Internazionale CX Città di Jesolo, Jesolo	C2	Filippo Fontana (ITA)	CS Carabinieri Olympia Vittoria	
11 December 2022	(Spain) Ziklokross Igorre, Igorre	C2	Anton Ferdinande (BEL)	Deschacht Hens Maes CX Team	
17 December 2022	(Japan) Utsunomiya Cyclo Cross Day1, Utsunomiya	C2	Hijiri Oda (JPN)	YowamushiPedal Cycling Team	
18 December 2022	(France) Cyclo-cross d'Orée d'Anjou, Saint-Sauveur-de-Landemont	C2	Valentin Guillaud (FRA)	Team Guevel Articreations	
18 December 2022	(Japan) Utsunomiya Cyclo Cross Day2, Utsunomiya	C2	Hijiri Oda (JPN)	YowamushiPedal Cycling Team	
23 December 2022	(Belgium) Exact Cross Trophy #5. Zilvermeercross, Mol	C2	Wout van Aert (BEL)	Team Jumbo–Visma	
28 December 2022	(Italy) Turin International Cyclocross, San Francesco al Campo	C2	Davide Toneatti (ITA)	XDS Astana Development Team	
30 December 2022	(Belgium) Exact Cross Trophy #6. Azencross, Loenhout	C1	Wout van Aert (BEL)	Team Jumbo–Visma	

=== January ===
Date	Course	Class	Winner	Team	Reference
1 January 2023	(Belgium) X²O Badkamers Trophy #3, Grand Prix Sven Nys, Baal	C1	Eli Iserbyt (BEL)	Pauwels Sauzen–Bingoal	
3 January 2023	(Belgium) X²O Badkamers Trophy #4, Herentals	C2	Mathieu van der Poel (NED)	Alpecin–Premier Tech	
5 January 2023	(Belgium) X²O Badkamers Trophy #5, Duinencross Koksijde, Koksijde	C1	Wout van Aert (BEL)	Team Jumbo–Visma	
7 January 2023	(United Kingdom) Clanfield Cross, Clanfield	C2	Joseph Blackmore (GBR)	Team Inspired	
16 January 2023	(Belgium) Nationale Cyclo-Cross Otegem, Otegem	C2	Laurens Sweeck (BEL)	Crelan-Fristads	
21 January 2023	(Belgium) Exact Cross Trophy #7, Kasteelcross, Zonnebeke	C2	Tim Merlier (BEL)	Soudal–Quick-Step	
21 January 2023	(Italy) 43° Gran Premio Mamma e Papa' Guerciotti am, Cremona	C2	Filippo Fontana (ITA)	CS Carabinieri Olympia Vittoria	
28 January 2023	(Belgium) X²O Badkamers Trophy #6, Flandriencross, Hamme	C1	Wout van Aert (BEL)	Team Jumbo–Visma	

=== February ===
Date	Course	Class	Winner	Team	Reference
5 February 2023	(Netherlands) 2023 UCI Cyclo-cross World Championships, Hoogerheide	WC	Mathieu van der Poel (NED)	Alpecin–Premier Tech	
8 February 2023	(Belgium) Parkcross, Maldegem	C2	Michael Vanthourenhout (BEL)	Pauwels Sauzen–Altez Industriebouw Cycling Team	
12 February 2023	(Belgium) X²O Badkamers Trophy #7, Krawatencross, Lille	C1	Laurens Sweeck (BEL)	Crelan-Fristads	
18 February 2023	(Belgium) Exact Cross Trophy #8, Waaslandcross, Sint-Niklaas	C2	Laurens Sweeck (BEL)	Crelan-Fristads	
19 February 2023	(Belgium) X²O Badkamers Trophy #8, Brussels Universities Cross, Brussels	C1	Eli Iserbyt (BEL)	Pauwels Sauzen–Altez Industriebouw Cycling Team	
26 February 2023	(Belgium) Sluitingsprijs Oostmalle, Oostmalle	C1	Laurens Sweeck (BEL)	Crelan-Fristads	

== 2022–23 UCI Cyclo-cross World Cup ==
Date	Course	Class	Winner	Team	Reference
9 October 2022	(United States) UCI Cyclo-cross World Cup #1, Waterloo	WC	Eli Iserbyt (BEL)	Pauwels Sauzen–Bingoal	
16 October 2022	(United States) UCI Cyclo-cross World Cup #2, Fayetteville	WC	Eli Iserbyt (BEL)	Pauwels Sauzen–Bingoal	
23 October 2022	(Czech Republic) UCI Cyclo-cross World Cup #3, Tábor	WC	Eli Iserbyt (BEL)	Pauwels Sauzen–Bingoal	
30 October 2022	(Netherlands) UCI Cyclo-cross World Cup #4, Rucphen	WC	Laurens Sweeck (BEL)	Crelan-Fristads	
13 November 2022	(Netherlands) UCI Cyclo-cross World Cup #5, Hilvarenbeek	WC	Laurens Sweeck (BEL)	Crelan-Fristads	
20 November 2022	(Belgium) UCI Cyclo-cross World Cup #6, Overijse	WC	Michael Vanthourenhout (BEL)	Pauwels Sauzen–Bingoal	
27 November 2022	(Netherlands) UCI Cyclo-cross World Cup #7, Hulst	WC	Mathieu van der Poel (NED)	Alpecin–Premier Tech	
4 December 2022	(Belgium) UCI Cyclo-cross World Cup #8, Antwerp	WC	Mathieu van der Poel (NED)	Alpecin–Premier Tech	
11 December 2022	(Republic of Ireland) UCI Cyclo-cross World Cup #9, Dublin	WC	Wout van Aert (BEL)	Team Jumbo–Visma	
17 December 2022	(Italy) UCI Cyclo-cross World Cup #10, Val di Sole	WC	Michael Vanthourenhout (BEL)	Pauwels Sauzen–Bingoal	
26 December 2022	(Belgium) UCI Cyclo-cross World Cup #11, Gavere	WC	Mathieu van der Poel (NED)	Alpecin–Premier Tech	
8 January 2023	(Belgium) UCI Cyclo-cross World Cup #12, Zonhoven	WC	Wout van Aert (BEL)	Team Jumbo–Visma	
22 January 2023	(Spain) UCI Cyclo-cross World Cup #13, Benidorm	WC	Mathieu van der Poel (NED)	Alpecin–Premier Tech	
29 January 2023	(France) UCI Cyclo-cross World Cup #14, Besançon	WC	Mathieu van der Poel (NED)	Alpecin–Premier Tech	

== National Cups ==
=== 2022 AusCycling CX National Series ===
Date	Course	Class	Winner	Team	Reference
4 June 2022	(Australia) AusCycing CX National Series #1, Adelaide	NC	Chris Jongewaard (AUS)	Norwood CC	
5 June 2022	(Australia) AusCycing CX National Series #2, Adelaide	NC	Chris Jongewaard (AUS)	Norwood CC	
18 June 2022	(Australia) AusCycing CX National Series #3, Brisbane	NC	Garry Millburn (AUS)	MAAP Sixpence CX Team	
19 June 2022	(Australia) AusCycing CX National Series #4, Brisbane	NC	Christopher Aitken (AUS)	MAAP Sixpence CX Team	
9 July 2022	(Australia) AusCycing CX National Series #5, Melbourne	NC	Garry Millburn (AUS)	MAAP Sixpence CX Team	
10 July 2022	(Australia) AusCycing CX National Series #6, Melbourne	NC	Garry Millburn (AUS)	MAAP Sixpence CX Team	

=== Austrian Cyclocross Cup 2022–23 ===
Date	Course	Class	Winner	Team	Reference
24 September 2022	(Lower Austria) BikeSchneiderei Cross – Austrian Cyclocross Cup #1, Maria Enzersdorf	NC/C2	Daniel Federspiel (AUT)	Team Felt–Felbermayr	
8 October 2022	(Lower Austria) Querfeldeinrennen durchs Stadion – Austrian Cyclocross Cup #2, Pernitz	NC/C1	Daniel Federspiel (AUT)	Team Felt–Felbermayr	
9 October 2022	(Lower Austria) Tage des Querfeldeinsports – Austrian Cyclocross Cup #3, Ternitz	NC/C1	Daniel Federspiel (AUT)	Team Felt–Felbermayr	
16 October 2022	(Lower Austria) 7. King & Queen of Seeschlacht – Austrian Cyclocross Cup #4, Langenzersdorf	NC/C1	Philipp Heigl (AUT)	SU Bikestore.cc Team	
22 October 2022	Kraftwerkscross Day 1 – Austrian Cyclocross Cup #5, Vienna	NC/C2	Daniel Federspiel (AUT)	Team Felt–Felbermayr	
23 October 2022	Kraftwerkscross Day 2 – Austrian Cyclocross Cup #6, Vienna	NC/C1	Daniel Federspiel (AUT)	Team Felt–Felbermayr	
30 October 2022	(Lower Austria) St. Pöltner Querfeldein im Kaiserwald – Austrian Cyclocross Cup #7, Sankt Pölten	NC	Philipp Heigl (AUT)	SU Bikestore.cc Team	
1 November 2022	(Lower Austria) Spusu Kreuttal Cross – Austrian Cyclocross Cup #8, Unterolberndorf	NC	Philipp Heigl (AUT)	SU Bikestore.cc Team	
19 November 2022	(Salzburg (state)) Radcrossrennen – Austrian Cyclocross Cup #9, Straßwalchen	NC	Michael Gaßner (GER)	RSV Moosburg	
20 November 2022	(Upper Austria) RCO Crossrennen – Austrian Cyclocross Cup #10, Wels	NC	Michael Gaßner (GER)	RSV Moosburg	
27 November 2022	(Lower Austria) Radcross – Austrian Cyclocross Cup #11, Böheimkirchen	NC	Michael Holland (AUT)	Naturfreunde Wilhelmsburg-Göblasbruck	
10 December 2022	(Upper Austria) Bad Ischler Radquerfeldein – Austrian Cyclocross Cup #12, Bad Ischl	NC	Daniel Federspiel (AUT)	Team Felt–Felbermayr	
11 December 2022	(Upper Austria) Crossrennen – Austrian Cyclocross Cup #13, Wels	NC	Daniel Mayer (CZE)	KC Hlinsko	
6 January 2023	(Lower Austria) 3KöniXcrosS – Austrian Cyclocross Cup #14, Sankt Pölten	NC	Daniel Federspiel (AUT)	Team Felt–Felbermayr	

=== Belgian Cyclocross Cup 2022–23 ===
Date	Course	Class	Winner	Team	Reference
29 October 2022	(Belgium) Superprestige #1, Oostkamp	C1	Eli Iserbyt (BEL)	Pauwels Sauzen–Bingoal	
11 November 2022	(Belgium) Superprestige #2, Jaarmarktcross, Niel	C1	Laurens Sweeck (BEL)	Crelan–Fristads	
19 November 2022	(Belgium) Superprestige #3, Merksplas	C1	Laurens Sweeck (BEL)	Crelan–Fristads	
3 December 2022	(Belgium) Superprestige #4, Gavere	C1	Thomas Pidcock (GBR)	INEOS Grenadiers	
27 December 2022	(Belgium) Superprestige #5, Heusden-Zolder	C1	Wout van Aert (BEL)	Team Jumbo–Visma	
28 December 2022	(Belgium) Superprestige #6, Diegem	C1	Wout van Aert (BEL)	Team Jumbo–Visma	
7 January 2023	(Belgium) Superprestige #7, Gullegem	C2	Wout van Aert (BEL)	Team Jumbo–Visma	
11 February 2023	(Belgium) Superprestige #8, Noordzeecross, Middelkerke	C1	Eli Iserbyt (BEL)	Pauwels Sauzen–Altez Industriebouw Cycling Team	

=== Croatian Mini Cyclocross Cup 2022–23 ===
Date	Course	Class	Winner	Team	Reference
4 December 2022	(Croatia) Ciklokros Sisak Šumica – Croatian Mini Cyclocross Cup #1, Sisak	NC	Viktor Potočki (CRO)	Ljubljana Gusto Santic	
18 December 2022	(Croatia) Ciklokros Petrinja – Croatian Mini Cyclocross Cup #2, Petrinja	NC	Cancelled		
8 January 2023	(Croatia) Ciklokros Sveta Nedelja – Croatian Mini Cyclocross Cup #3, Sveta Nedelja	NC	Cancelled		

=== Czech Cyclocross Cup 2022 ===
Date	Course	Class	Winner	Team	Reference
28 September 2022	(Czech Republic) Toi Toi Cup #1, Holé Vrchy	C2	Michael Boroš (CZE)	Elkov–Kasper	
1 October 2022	(Czech Republic) Toi Toi Cup #2, Hlinsko	C2	Michael Boroš (CZE)	Elkov–Kasper	
8 October 2022	(Czech Republic) Toi Toi Cup #3, Jičín	C2	Anton Ferdinande (BEL)	Pauwels Sauzen–Bingoal	
12 November 2022	(Czech Republic) Toi Toi Cup #4, Veselí nad Lužnicí	C2	Adam Ťoupalík (CZE)	Elkov–Kasper	
13 November 2022	(Czech Republic) Toi Toi Cup #5, Chýnov	NC	Matěj Stránský (CZE)	ATT Investments	
17 November 2022	(Czech Republic) Toi Toi Cup #6, Slaný	C2	Matyáš Fiala (CZE)	ČEZ Cyklo Team Tábor	
26 November 2022	(Czech Republic) Toi Toi Cup #7, Čáslav	NC	Cancelled		
3 December 2022	(Czech Republic) Toi Toi Cup #8, Kolín	C2	Šimon Vaníček (CZE)	ČEZ Cyklo Team Tábor	
10 December 2022	(Czech Republic) Toi Toi Cup #9, Rýmařov	C2	Marek Konwa (POL)	GKS Krupiński Suszec	

=== Danish Cyclocross Cup 2022–2023 ===
Date	Course	Class	Winner	Team	Reference
8 October 2022	(Denmark) Danish Cyclocross Cup #1, Roskilde	NC	Karl-Erik Rosendahl (DEN)	Team Nyt Syn	
29 October 2022	(Denmark) Danish Cyclocross Cup #2, Aarhus	NC	Karl-Erik Rosendahl (DEN)	Team Nyt Syn	
30 October 2022	(Denmark) Danish Cyclocross Cup #3, Aarhus	NC	Karl-Erik Rosendahl (DEN)	Team Nyt Syn	
6 November 2022	(Denmark) Danish Cyclocross Cup #4, Odense	NC	Karl-Erik Rosendahl (DEN)	Team Nyt Syn	
3 December 2022	(Denmark) Danish Cyclocross Cup #5, Holbæk	NC	Gustav Frederik Dahl (DEN)	Team Give Elementer	
8 January 2023	(Denmark) Danish Cyclocross Cup #6, Kalundborg	NC	Karl-Erik Rosendahl (DEN)	Cycling Odense	

=== Estonian Cyclocross Cup 2022–23 ===
Date	Course	Class	Winner	Team	Reference
25 September 2022	(Estonia) Viljandi CX – Estonian Cyclocross Cup #1, Viljandi	NC/C2	Markus Mäeuibo (EST)	Kalevi Jalgrattakool	
1 October 2022	(Estonia) Elva CX – Estonian Cyclocross Cup #2, Bensheim	NC/C2	Māris Bogdanovičs (LVA)	Giant&Liv Team Latvia	
15 October 2022	(Estonia) Rapla CX – Estonian Cyclocross Cup #3, Rapla	NC/C1	Markus Pajur (EST)	Arkéa–Samsic	
16 October 2022	(Estonia) Tallinn CX – Estonian Cyclocross Cup #4, Tallinn	NC/C1	Frank Aron Ragilo (EST)		
29 October 2022	(Estonia) Rakke CX – Estonian Cyclocross Cup #5, Rakke	NC/C1	Matīss Kaļveršs (LVA)	XDS Astana Development Team	
5 November 2022	(Estonia) Otepää CX – Estonian Cyclocross Cup #6, Otepää	NC/C1	Matīss Kaļveršs (LVA)	XDS Astana Development Team	

=== Finnish Cyclocross Cup 2022 ===
Date	Course	Class	Winner	Team	Reference
10 September 2022	(Finland) Keinukallio L5 – Finnish Cyclocross Cup #1, Kerava	NC	Kimmo Kananen (FIN)	IBD Cycling	
18 September 2022	(Finland) Kouvola L5 – Finnish Cyclocross Cup #2, Helsinki	NC	Aksel Rantanen (FIN)	Akilles Green Team	
1 October 2022	(Finland) Olari - L5 – Finnish Cyclocross Cup #3, Helsinki	NC	Aksel Rantanen (FIN)	Akilles Green Team	
8 October 2022	(Finland) Pori L5 – Finnish Cyclocross Cup #4, Helsinki	NC	Aksel Rantanen (FIN)	Akilles Green Team	
15 October 2022	(Finland) Lappeenranta L5 – Finnish Cyclocross Cup #5, Helsinki	NC	Kimmo Kananen (FIN)	IBD Cycling	
29 October 2022	(Finland) Tuusula L5 – Finnish Cyclocross Cup #6, Helsinki	NC	Antti-Jussi Juntunen (FIN)	Abloc CT	
5 November 2022	(Finland) Porvoo L5 – Finnish Cyclocross Cup #7, Helsinki	NC	Antti-Jussi Juntunen (FIN)	Abloc CT	
20 November 2022	(Finland) Helsinki L5 – Finnish Cyclocross Cup #8, Helsinki	NC	Nicolas Grönlund (FIN)	CCH	

=== 2022 Coupe de France Cyclo-cross ===
Date	Course	Class	Winner	Team	Reference
22 October 2022	Coupe de France Cyclo-cross #1, Nommay	C2	Gerben Kuypers (BEL)	Proximus-AlphaMotorhomes-Doltcini CT	
23 October 2022	Coupe de France Cyclo-cross #2, Nommay	C2	Gerben Kuypers (BEL)	Proximus-AlphaMotorhomes-Doltcini CT	
19 November 2022	Coupe de France Cyclo-cross #3, Camors	C2	Gerben Kuypers (BEL)	Proximus-AlphaMotorhomes-Doltcini CT	
20 November 2022	Coupe de France Cyclo-cross #4, Camors	C2	Gerben Kuypers (BEL)	Proximus-AlphaMotorhomes-Doltcini CT	
3 December 2022	Coupe de France Cyclo-cross #5, Troyes	C2	Gerben Kuypers (BEL)	Proximus-AlphaMotorhomes-Doltcini CT	
4 December 2022	Coupe de France Cyclo-cross #6, Troyes	C2	Clément Horny (BEL)	BH-Wallonie MTB Team	

=== Bikebeat German Bundesliga CycloCross 2022/23 ===
Date	Course	Class	Winner	Team	Reference
10 September 2022	(Germany) 4 Bikes Festival CX-Race – Bundesliga CycloCross #1, Lützelbach	NC/C2	Marcel Meisen (GER)	STEVENS Racing Team	
11 September 2022	(Germany) Internationaler GGEW Grand Prix – Bundesliga CycloCross #2, Bensheim	NC/C2	Niels Vandeputte (BEL)	Alpecin–Premier Tech	
8 October 2022	(Germany) Bundesliga CycloCross Cup #3, Bad Salzdetfurth	NC	Marcel Meisen (GER)	STEVENS Racing Team	
9 October 2022	(Germany) International Cyclo-Cross - Bad Salzdetfurth – Bundesliga CycloCross Cup #4, Bad Salzdetfurth	NC/C1	Emiel Verstrynge (BEL)	Crelan-Fristads	
16 October 2022	(Germany) Rund um den Lohner Aussichtsturm – Bundesliga CycloCross Cup #5, Lohne	NC	Luca Harter (GER)	STEVENS Racing Team	
22 October 2022	(Germany) 2. QuerFeldRhein – Bundesliga CycloCross Cup #6, Düsseldorf	NC	Lars Hemmerling (GER)	Team BEACON - Drinkuth Elite/U23	
12 November 2022	(Germany) Vaihinger Radcross – Bundesliga CycloCross Cup #7, Stuttgart	NC	Marcel Meisen (GER)	STEVENS Racing Team	
13 November 2022	(Germany) Magstadter Radcross – Bundesliga CycloCross Cup #8, Magstadt	NC	Marcel Meisen (GER)	STEVENS Racing Team	
3 December 2022	(Germany) Königshammer Cross – Bundesliga CycloCross Cup #10, Baiersbronn	NC	Marcel Meisen (GER)	STEVENS Racing Team	
4 December 2022	(Germany) Großen Preis der Badischen – Bundesliga CycloCross Cup #11, Kehl	NC	Fabian Eder (GER)	Heizomat Radteam p/b Kloster Kitchen	
11 December 2022	(Germany) Rund um die Chemnitzer Radrennbahn – Bundesliga CycloCross Cup #13, Chemnitz	NC	Lennart Lein (GER)	STEVENS Racing Team U23	
18 December 2022	(Germany) 43. Harburger Weihnachtspreis – Bundesliga CycloCross Cup #14, Hamburg	NC	Fynn Termin (GER)	STEVENS Racing Team U23	
8 January 2023	(Germany) Preis der Stadt Vechta – Bundesliga CycloCross Cup #15, Lohne	NC	Hannes Degenkolb (GER)	RSV Team Auto-Riedel Schwarzenberg	

=== 2022–23 British National Trophy Series ===
Date	Course	Class	Winner	Team	Reference
9 October 2022	(United Kingdom) British National Trophy Series Round #1, Derby	C2	Witse Meeussen (BEL)	Pauwels Sauzen–Bingoal	
23 October 2022	(United Kingdom) British National Trophy Series Round #2, Falkirk	C2	Cameron Mason (GBR)	Trinity Racing	
30 October 2022	(United Kingdom) British National Trophy Series Round #3, South Shields	C2	Thomas Mein (GBR)	Hope Factory Racing	
20 November 2022	(United Kingdom) British National Trophy Series Round #4, Paignton	C2	Toby Barnes (GBR)	WiV SunGod	
18 December 2022	(United Kingdom) British National Trophy Series Round #5, Skipton	C2	Corran Carrick-Anderson (GBR)	T-Mo Racing	
8 January 2023	(United Kingdom) British National Trophy Series Round #6, Gravesend	C2	Thomas Mein (GBR)	Hope Factory Racing	

=== 2022 Cyclo-cross Magyar Kupa ===
Date	Course	Class	Winner	Team	Reference
1 October 2022	(Hungary) Cyclo-cross Magyar Kupa #1, Zalakaros	NC	Zsolt Búr (HUN)	Vialand Racing Team	
16 October 2022	(Hungary) Cyclo-cross Magyar Kupa #2, Iszkaszentgyörgy	NC	Balázs Rózsa (HUN)	Epronex-Hungary Cycling Team	
13 November 2022	(Hungary) Cyclo-cross Magyar Kupa #3, Budapest	NC	Cancelled		
27 November 2022	(Hungary) Cyclo-cross Magyar Kupa #4, Debrecen	NC	Márton Dina (HUN)	Eolo–Kometa	
18 December 2022	(Hungary) Cyclo-cross Magyar Kupa #5, Kecskemét	NC	Bence Darányi (HUN)	Buruczki Testedző SZSE	

=== 2022 Irish Cyclocross National Series ===
Date	Course	Class	Winner	Team	Reference
19 November 2022	(Republic of Ireland) Westport CC – Irish Cyclocross National Series #1, Westport	NC	Dean Harvey (IRL)	Spellman-Dublin Port	
26 November 2022	(Republic of Ireland) Upperchurch Drombane CC – Irish Cyclocross National Series #2, Thurles	NC	Dean Harvey (IRL)	Spellman-Dublin Port	
28 December 2022	(Republic of Ireland) Bellurgan Wheelers – Irish Cyclocross National Series #3, Jenkinstown	NC	Dean Harvey (IRL)	Spellman-Dublin Port	
7 January 2023	(Republic of Ireland) Velocity Road Club – Irish Cyclocross National Series #4, Portadown	NC	Dean Harvey (IRL)	Spellman-Dublin Port	

=== 2022 Giro d'Italia Cross ===
Date	Course	Class	Winner	Team	Reference
2 October 2022	(Italy) Giro d'Italia Cross #1, Corridonia	NC	Gioele Bertolini (ITA)	Selle Italia Guerciotti Elite	
9 October 2022	(Italy) Giro d'Italia Cross #2, Osoppo	NC	Gioele Bertolini (ITA)	Selle Italia Guerciotti Elite	
16 October 2022	(Italy) Giro d'Italia Cross #3, Sant'Elpidio a Mare	NC	Marco Pavan (ITA)	Team Cingolani	
30 October 2022	(Italy) Giro d'Italia Cross #4, Follonica	C2	Marco Pavan (ITA)	Team Cingolani	
13 November 2022	(Italy) Giro d'Italia Cross #5, Ovindoli	NC	Marco Pavan (ITA)	Team Cingolani	
18 December 2022	(Italy) Giro d'Italia Cross #6, Gallipoli	NC	Marco Pavan (ITA)	Team Cingolani	

=== 2022 Lithuanian Velo CX Cup ===
Date	Course	Class	Winner	Team	Reference
25 September 2022	(Lithuania) Velo CX #1, Vilnius	NC	Eimantas Gudiškis (LTU)	Colibri Cycling	
9 October 2022	(Lithuania) Velo CX #2, Vilnius	NC	Jonas Maišelis (LTU)	Veloklinika Cycling Team	
16 October 2022	(Lithuania) Velo CX #3, Vilnius	NC	Venantas Lašinis (LTU)	Kaunas Cycling Team	
6 November 2022	(Lithuania) Velo CX #4, Vilnius	NC	Venantas Lašinis (LTU)	Atletų kalvė	

=== ŠKODA Coupe de Louxembourg Cyclo-cross 2022–23 ===
Date	Course	Class	Winner	Team	Reference
1 October 2022	(Luxembourg) Urban Night Cross – ŠKODA Coupe de Louxembourg Cyclo-cross #1, Reckange-sur-Mess	NC	Enzo Chopineaux (FRA)	Club Cycliste Les Baroudeurs de Ligny	
9 October 2022	(Luxembourg) GP Garage Thommes – ŠKODA Coupe de Louxembourg Cyclo-cross #2, Dippach	NC	Ken Conter (LUX)	Team Snooze - VSD	
15 October 2022	(Luxembourg) Grand Prix Securitec – ŠKODA Coupe de Louxembourg Cyclo-cross #3, Kayl	NC	Hugo Boulanger (FRA)	VC Hettange-Grande	
23 October 2022	(Luxembourg) Cyclo-Cross régional – ŠKODA Coupe de Louxembourg Cyclo-cross #4, Mondorf-les-Bains	NC	Ken Conter (LUX)	Team Snooze - VSD	
29 October 2022	(Luxembourg) Grand-prix de la Commune de Contern – ŠKODA Coupe de Louxembourg Cyclo-cross #5, Contern	NC/C2	Cancelled		
6 November 2022	(Luxembourg) 23eme Festival Cyclo-cross Jos Bausch – ŠKODA Coupe de Louxembourg Cyclo-cross #6, Brouch	NC	Mats Wenzel (LUX)	Leopard TOGT Pro Cycling	
13 November 2022	(Luxembourg) Grand Prix SNOOZE – ŠKODA Coupe de Louxembourg Cyclo-cross #7, Leudelange	NC	Cancelled		
20 November 2022	(Luxembourg) Cyclo-Cross Régional – ŠKODA Coupe de Louxembourg Cyclo-cross #8, Esch-sur-Alzette	NC	Mats Wenzel (LUX)	Leopard TOGT Pro Cycling	
27 November 2022	(Luxembourg) Grand Prix MAROLDT – ŠKODA Coupe de Louxembourg Cyclo-cross #9, Leudelange	NC	Elio Clarysse (BEL)	Proximus-Alphamotorhomes-Doltcini	
11 December 2022	(Luxembourg) Cyclocross régional Tooltime Préizerdaul – ŠKODA Coupe de Louxembourg Cyclo-cross #10, Préizerdaul	NC	Mathijs Wuyts (BEL)	Tarteletto–Isorex	
18 December 2022	(Luxembourg) 17eme Nordstaad Cyclo-Cross régional – ŠKODA Coupe de Louxembourg Cyclo-cross #11, Ettelbruck	NC	Mathieu Kockelmann (LUX)	CCI Differdange	
1 January 2023	(Luxembourg) Grand Prix Garage Collé – ŠKODA Coupe de Louxembourg Cyclo-cross #12, Pétange	NC/C2	Joshua Dubau (FRA)	Rockrider Racing Team	
7 January 2023	(Luxembourg) Cyclo-Cross régional – ŠKODA Coupe de Louxembourg Cyclo-cross #13, Hesperange	NC	Sascha Weber (GER)	Trek Freiburg	
21 January 2023	(Luxembourg) Cyclocross Schëffleng – ŠKODA Coupe de Louxembourg Cyclo-cross #14, Hesperange	NC	Raphaël Kockelmann (LUX)	CC Chevigny	

=== NorgesCup CX Cup 2022 ===
Date	Course	Class	Winner	Team	Reference
24 September 2022	(Norway) NorgesCup CX Cup #1, Oslo	NC	Knut Røhme (NOR)	Romeriksåsen SK	
25 September 2022	(Norway) NorgesCup CX Cup #2, Oslo	NC	Mats Tubaas Glende (NOR)	Soon CK	
8 October 2022	(Norway) Føyka Kross #1 – NorgesCup CX Cup #3, Asker	NC	Mats Tubaas Glende (NOR)	Soon CK	
9 October 2022	(Norway) Føyka Kross #2 – NorgesCup CX Cup #4, Asker	NC	Mats Tubaas Glende (NOR)	Soon CK	
22 October 2022	(Norway) StudentCross #1 – NorgesCup CX Cup #5, Halden	NC	Martin E. Farstadvoll (NOR)	IF Frøy	
23 October 2022	(Norway) StudentCross #2 – NorgesCup CX Cup #6, Halden	NC	Ole Sigurd Rekdahl (NOR)	Halden CK	
29 October 2022	(Norway) SkanseCross #1 – NorgesCup CX Cup #7, Drøbak	NC	Mats Tubaas Glende (NOR)	Soon CK	
30 October 2022	(Norway) SkanseCross #2 – NorgesCup CX Cup #8, Drøbak	NC	Mats Tubaas Glende (NOR)	Soon CK	
5 November 2022	(Norway) Spikkestad røyk, rock og Kross #1 – NorgesCup CX Cup #9, Spikkestad	NC	Erik Resell (NOR)	TVK/Uno-X Pro Cycling Team	
6 November 2022	(Norway) Spikkestad røyk, rock og Kross #2 – NorgesCup CX Cup #10, Spikkestad	NC	Erik Resell (NOR)	TVK/Uno-X Pro Cycling Team	
12 November 2022	(Norway) Sykkelkross #1 – NorgesCup CX Cup #11, Sandnes	NC	Mats Tubaas Glende (NOR)	Soon CK	
13 November 2022	(Norway) Sykkelkross #2 – NorgesCup CX Cup #12, Sandnes	NC	Ole Sigurd Rekdahl (NOR)	Halden CK	

=== Netherlands Cyclocross Cup 2022 ===
Date	Course	Class	Winner	Team	Reference
17 September 2022	Kleeberg Cross – Netherlands Cyclocross Cup #1, Gulpen-Wittem	NC/C2	Pim Ronhaar (NED)	Baloise–Trek Lions	
8 October 2022	Boverhoff Nationale Cyclocross Heerderstrand 2022 – Netherlands Cyclocross Cup #2, Heerde	NC	Danny van Lierop (NED)	Orange Babies Cycling Team	
16 October 2022	GP Oisterwijk – Netherlands Cyclocross Cup #3, Oisterwijk	C2	Ryan Kamp (NED)	Pauwels Sauzen–Bingoal	
22 October 2022	tevens Nationale veldrit Rotterdam – Netherlands Cyclocross Cup #4, Rotterdam	NC	Twan van der Drift (NED)		
25 October 2022	Kiremko Nacht van Woerden – Netherlands Cyclocross Cup #5, Woerden	C2	Lars van der Haar (NED)	Baloise–Trek Lions	
30 October 2022	Nationale Veldrit Almelo – Netherlands Cyclocross Cup #6, Almelo	NC	Pete Uptegrove (NED)	BHST Cycling Team	
19 November 2022	Janet Memorial Veldrit van Hilversum – Netherlands Cyclocross Cup #7, Laren	NC	Max Goris (NED)	Maas CT	
20 November 2022	2e Van den Akker Aqua Service Veldrit– Netherlands Cyclocross Cup #8, Heeswijk-Dinther	NC	Mathijs Wuyts (BEL)	CPX Scott Racing Team	
27 November 2022	Nationale Cross CC75 Nijverdal – Netherlands Cyclocross Cup #9, Nijverdal	NC	Cancelled		
10 December 2022	TC - 41e Nationale Veldrit van Amersfoort – Netherlands Cyclocross Cup #10, Amersfoort	NC	Tom Schellekens (NED)	EA Maxi Bikes Cycling Team	
11 December 2022	Veldrit Hoogeveen – Netherlands Cyclocross Cup #11, Hoogeveen	NC	Bart Kortleve (NED)		
18 December 2022	Nationale Veldrit van Boxtel – Netherlands Cyclocross Cup #12, Boxtel	NC	Tom Schellekens (NED)	EA Maxi Bikes Cycling Team	
26 December 2022	Kerstcross – Netherlands Cyclocross Cup #13, Norg	NC	Thymen Arensman (NED)	Team DSM	
8 January 2023	Kasteelcross Vorden – Netherlands Cyclocross Cup #14, Vorden	NC	Rens Teunissen van Manen (NED)		

=== Puchar Polski CX 2022 ===
Date	Course	Class	Winner	Team	Reference
9 October 2022	(Poland) Puchar Polski CX #1, Choszczno	NC	Szymon Pomian (POL)	GKS Cartusia w Kartuzach	
15 October 2022	(Poland) Puchar Polski CX #2, Tokarnia	NC	Szymon Pomian (POL)	GKS Cartusia w Kartuzach	
16 October 2022	(Poland) Puchar Polski CX #3, Środa Wielkopolska	NC	Bartosz Mikler (POL)	Mluks Victoria Jarocin	
23 October 2022	(Poland) Puchar Polski CX #4, Jelenia Góra	NC	Paweł Król (POL)	Warszawski Klub Kolarski	
29 October 2022	(Poland) Mikolow 800th Anniversary Cup/Puchar 800-lecie Mikołowa – Puchar Polski CX #5, Mikołów	C2/NC	Marek Konwa (POL)	UKS Krupiński Suszec	
30 October 2022	(Poland) Puchar Polski CX #6, Kluczbork	NC	Patryk Stosz (POL)	Voster ATS Team	
5 November 2022	(Poland) Puchar Polski CX #7, Włoszakowice	NC	Patryk Stosz (POL)	Voster ATS Team	
6 November 2022	(Poland) Puchar Polski CX #8, Zwierzyn	NC	Michał Topór (POL)	NS Bikes	
11 November 2022	(Poland) Puchar Polski CX #9, Częstochowa	NC	Patryk Stosz (POL)	Voster ATS Team	
12 November 2022	(Poland) Puchar Polski CX #10, Szczekociny	NC	Ondřej Zelený (CZE)	Eleven Black ET	
13 November 2022	(Poland) Puchar Polski CX #11, Turawa	NC	Patryk Stosz (POL)	Voster ATS Team	
19 November 2022	(Poland) Puchar Polski CX #12, Jelcz-Laskowice	NC	Mariusz Gil (POL)	Euro Bike Kaczmarek Electric Team	
20 November 2022	(Poland) Puchar Polski CX #13, Złotów	NC	Cancelled		
26 November 2022	(Poland) Suszec Cross – Puchar Polski CX #14, Suszec	C2/NC	Cancelled		
27 November 2022	(Poland) XXIX Bryksy Cross Gościęcin – Puchar Polski CX #14, Gościęcin	C2/NC	Marek Konwa (POL)	UKS Krupiński Suszec	
3 December 2022	(Poland) Puchar Polski CX #15, Bieganów	NC	Mariusz Gil (POL)	Euro Bike Kaczmarek Electric Team	
4 December 2022	(Poland) Puchar Polski CX #16, Słubice	NC	Dawid Jona (POL)	Grupa Kolarska Gliwice	
10 December 2022	(Poland) Puchar Polski CX #17, Władysławowo	NC	Bartosz Mikler (POL)	Victoria Jarocin Accent	
11 December 2022	(Poland) Puchar Polski CX #18, Władysławowo	NC	Mariusz Gil (POL)	Euro Bike Kaczmarek Electric Team	

=== Taça de Portugal de Ciclocrosse 2022–23 ===
Date	Course	Class	Winner	Team	Reference
30 October 2022	(Portugal) Ciclocrosse de Melgaço – Portuguese Cyclocross Cup #1, Melgaço	NC	Mário Costa (POR)	AXPO/FirstBike Team/Vila do Conde	
13 November 2022	(Portugal) Portuguese Cyclocross Cup #2, Vila Real	NC	Márcio Barbosa (POR)	Feirense–Beeceler	
27 November 2022	(Portugal) 2a Superliga Cro Acporto Ciclocrosse Santo Tirso – Portuguese Cyclocross Cup #3, Santo Tirso	NC	Mário Costa (POR)	AXPO/FirstBike Team/Vila do Conde	
17 December 2022	(Portugal) Portuguese Cyclocross Cup #4, Abrantes	NC	Roberto Ferreira (POR)	Guilhabreu BTT	
18 December 2022	(Portugal) Portuguese Cyclocross Cup #5, Ansião	NC	Mário Costa (POR)	AXPO/FirstBike Team/Vila do Conde	

=== Cupa Națională de Ciclocros a României 2022 ===
Date	Course	Class	Winner	Team	Reference
12 November 2022	(Romania) Lunca Timișului CX – Romanian Cyclocross Cup #1, Timișoara	C1	Gosse van der Meer (NED)	Bombtrack Bicycles p/b Hunt Wheels	
26 November 2022	(Romania) Cupa Paradisul Verde – Romanian Cyclocross Cup #2, Corbeanca	NC	József Attila Málnási (ROU)	Carcover Veloteca Racing Team	
11 December 2022	(Romania) Central Stage – Romanian Cyclocross Cup #3, Făgăraș	NC	József Attila Málnási (ROU)	Carcover Veloteca Racing Team	

=== Slovak Cyclocross Cup 2022 ===
Date	Course	Class	Winner	Team	Reference
9 October 2022	(Slovakia) Grand Prix Podbrezová – Slovak Cyclocross Cup #1, Podbrezová	NC/C2	Šimon Vaníček (CZE)	ČEZ Cyklo Team Tábor	
15 October 2022	(Slovakia) Grand Prix Dohnany 1 – Slovak Cyclocross Cup #2, Dohňany	C2	Ward Huybs (BEL)	Baloise–Trek Lions	
16 October 2022	(Slovakia) Grand Prix Dohnany 2 – Slovak Cyclocross Cup #3, Dohňany	C2	Zdeněk Štybar (CZE)	Quick-Step Alpha Vinyl Team	
22 October 2022	(Slovakia) Grand Prix Topoľčianky 1 – Slovak Cyclocross Cup #4, Topoľčianky	C2	Victor Van de Putte (BEL)	Deschacht Hens Maes CX Team	
23 October 2022	(Slovakia) Grand Prix Topoľčianky 2 – Slovak Cyclocross Cup #5, Topoľčianky	C2	Ward Huybs (BEL)	Baloise–Trek Lions	
17 November 2022	(Slovakia) Grand Prix X-Bionic Samorin 1 – Slovak Cyclocross Cup #6, Šamorín	C2	Marek Konwa (POL)	Team UKS Krupinski Suszek	
19 November 2022	(Slovakia) Grand Prix X-Bionic Samorin 2 – Slovak Cyclocross Cup #7, Šamorín	C1	Victor Van de Putte (BEL)	Deschacht Hens Maes CX Team	
20 November 2022	(Slovakia) Grand Prix Trnava – Slovak Cyclocross Cup #8, Trnava	C2	Victor Van de Putte (BEL)	Deschacht Hens Maes CX Team	

=== Pokal Slovenije v ciklokrosu 2022–2023 ===
Date	Course	Class	Winner	Team	Reference
11 December 2022	(Slovenia) Ciklokros Straža – Pokal Slovenije v ciklokrosu #1, Straža	NC	Mihael Štajnar (SVN)	MebloJogi Pro - Concrete	
26 December 2022	(Slovenia) 2. Ciklokros Ljubljana – Pokal Slovenije v ciklokrosu #2, Ljubljana	NC	Mihael Štajnar (SVN)	MebloJogi Pro - Concrete	
15 January 2023	(Slovenia) Ciklokros Ilirska Bistrica – Pokal Slovenije v ciklokrosu #3, Ilirska Bistrica	NC	Cancelled		

=== Copa de España de Ciclocross 2022 ===
Date	Course	Class	Winner	Team	Reference
2 October 2022	(Spain) Copa de España de Ciclocross #1, Gijón	C2	Kevin Suárez (ESP)	Nesta-MMR CX Team	
8 October 2022	(Spain) Copa de España de Ciclocross #2, Pontevedra	C1	Ryan Kamp (NED)	Pauwels Sauzen–Bingoal	
30 October 2022	(Spain) Copa de España de Ciclocross #3, Les Franqueses del Vallès	C2	Mario Junquera (ESP)	Unicaja Banco - Gijón CX Team	
5 November 2022	(Spain) Copa de España de Ciclocross #3, Laudio/Llodio	C1	Kevin Suárez (ESP)	Nesta-MMR CX Team	
6 November 2022	(Spain) Copa de España de Ciclocross #4, Karrantza	C2	Kevin Suárez (ESP)	Nesta-MMR CX Team	
12–13 November 2022	(Spain) Copa de España de Ciclocross #5, Tarancón	C2	Kevin Suárez (ESP)	Nesta-MMR CX Team	
20 November 2022	(Spain) Copa de España de Ciclocross #6, Alcobendas	C2	Kevin Suárez (ESP)	Nesta-MMR CX Team	
17 December 2022	(Spain) Copa de España de Ciclocross #7, Xàtiva	C2	Felipe Orts (ESP)	Burgos BH	
18 December 2022	(Spain) Copa de España de Ciclocross #8, Valencia	C2	Gonzalo Inguanzo (ESP)	Súper Froiz Cycling Team	

=== 2022 Swedish National Cyclocross Cup ===
Date	Course	Class	Winner	Team	Reference
15 October 2022	(Sweden) CX Täby Park – Swedish Cyclocross Cup #1, Täby	C2	Arne Baers (BEL)	Tormans CX Team	
16 October 2022	(Sweden) Stockholm cyclocross – Swedish Cyclocross Cup #2, Stockholm	C2	Arne Baers (BEL)	Tormans CX Team	
19 November 2022	(Sweden) Varberg cyclocross #1 – Swedish Cyclocross Cup #3, Varberg	NC	Filip Mård (SWE)	Motala AIF Continental	
20 November 2022	(Sweden) Varberg cyclocross #2 – Swedish Cyclocross Cup #4, Varberg	NC	Filip Mård (SWE)	Motala AIF Continental	

=== Swiss Ciclocross Cup 2022-2023 ===
Date	Course	Class	Winner	Team	Reference
2 October 2022	(Switzerland) Swiss Cyclocross Cup #1 – Radquer Mettmenstetten, Mettmenstetten	C2	Kevin Kuhn (SUI)	Tormans CX Team	
23 October 2022	(Switzerland) AlperoseQuer Schneisingen-Swiss Cyclocross Cup #2, Schneisingen	C2	Yorben Lauryssen (BEL)	Pauwels Sauzen–Bingoal	
30 October 2022	(Switzerland) CX de Bulle-Swiss Cyclocross Cup #3, Bulle	C2	Loris Rouiller (SUI)	Cross Team Legendre	
13 November 2022	(Switzerland) Radquer Hittnau-Swiss Cyclocross Cup #4, Hittnau	C2	Jakub Řiman (CZE)	TJ Auto Škoda MB	
2 January 2023	(Switzerland) Cyclocross Meilen-Swiss Cyclocross Cup #5, Meilen	C2	Kevin Kuhn (SUI)	Tormans CX Team	

=== USCX Cyclocross Series 2022 ===
Date	Course	Class	Winner	Team	Reference
17 September 2022	(United States) USCX Cyclocross – Virginia's Blue Ridge GO Cross – Day 1, Roanoke	NC/C1	Vincent Baestaens (BEL)	Spits CX Team	
18 September 2022	(United States) USCX Cyclocross – Virginia's Blue Ridge GO Cross – Day 2, Roanoke	NC/C2	Vincent Baestaens (BEL)	Spits CX Team	
24 September 2022	(United States) USPCX Cyclocross – Rochester Cyclocross – Day 1, Rochester	C1	Vincent Baestaens (BEL)	Spits CX Team	
25 September 2022	(United States) USPCX Cyclocross – Rochester Cyclocross – Day 2, Rochester	C1	Vincent Baestaens (BEL)	Spits CX Team	
1 October 2022	(United States) USCX Cyclocross – Charm City Cross Day 1, Baltimore	C1	Vincent Baestaens (BEL)	Spits CX Team	
2 October 2022	(United States) USCX Cyclocross – Charm City Cross Day 2, Baltimore	C2	Curtis White (USA)	STF Racing	
5 November 2022	(United States) USPCX Cyclocross – Really Rad Festival of Cyclocross – Day 1, Falmouth	C1	Eric Brunner (USA)	Blue Stages Racing	
6 November 2022	(United States) USPCX Cyclocross – Really Rad Festival of Cyclocross – Day 2, Falmouth	C2	Eric Brunner (USA)	Blue Stages Racing	

== Number of wins ==
#	Racer	Team	W	CDM	SP	X²O	ETH
1	(Belgium) Vincent Baestaens	Spits CX Team	5	0	0	0	0
2	(Belgium) Eli Iserbyt	Pauwels Sauzen–Bingoal	0	1	0	0	1
–	(Belgium) Michael Vanthourenhout	Pauwels Sauzen–Bingoal	0	0	0	0	2
–	(Czech Republic) Michael Boroš	Elkov–Kasper	2	0	0	0	0
–	(Netherlands) Ryan Kamp	Pauwels Sauzen–Bingoal	2	0	0	0	0
–	(Switzerland) Kevin Kuhn	Tormans CX Team	2	0	0	0	0
4	(Belgium) Anton Ferdinande	Pauwels Sauzen–Bingoal	1	0	0	0	0
–	(Belgium) Lander Loockx	Deschacht–Hens–Maes	1	0	0	0	0
–	(Belgium) Witse Meeussen	Pauwels Sauzen–Bingoal	1	0	0	0	0
–	(Belgium) Diether Sweeck	Crelan – Fristads	1	0	0	0	0
–	(Belgium) Niels Vandeputte	Alpecin–Premier Tech	1	0	0	0	0
–	(Belgium) Emiel Verstrynge	Crelan – Fristads	1	0	0	0	0
–	(Czech Republic) Šimon Vaníček	ČEZ Cyklo Team Tábor	1	0	0	0	0
–	(Estonia) Madis Mihkels	Team Ampler-Tartu2024	1	0	0	0	0
–	(France) Clément Venturini	AG2R Citroën Team	1	0	0	0	0
–	(Germany) Marcel Meisen	Stevens Bikes Hamburg	1	0	0	0	0
–	(Netherlands) Lars van der Haar	Baloise–Trek Lions	1	0	0	0	0
–	(Netherlands) Pim Ronhaar	Baloise–Trek Lions	1	0	0	0	0
–	(Spain) Felipe Orts	Burgos BH	1	0	0	0	0
–	(Spain) Kevin Suárez Fernández	Nesta-MMR CX Team	1	0	0	0	0
–	(United States) Curtis White	STF Racing	1	0	0	0	0

== Women ==
=== September ===
Date	Course	Class	Winner	Team	References
18 September 2022	(Belgium) Exact Cross Trophy #1 Polderscross, Kruibeke	C2	Fem van Empel (NED)	Pauwels Sauzen–Bingoal	
25 September 2022	(Switzerland) Radcross Illnau, Illnau-Effretikon	C2	Hélène Clauzel (FRA)	AS Bike Racing	
25 September 2022	(France) Cyclo-cross international de Boulzicourt Ardennes, Boulzicourt	C2	Amandine Fouquenet (FRA)	Arkéa Pro Cycling Team	
25 September 2022	(Belgium) Exact Cross Trophy #2, Beringen	C2	Fem van Empel (NED)	Pauwels Sauzen–Bingoal	

=== October ===
Date	Course	Class	Winner	Team	References
1 October 2022	(Belgium) Exact Cross Trophy #3, Berencross, Meulebeke	C2	Lucinda Brand (NED)	Baloise–Trek Lions	
7 October 2022	(United States) Trek Cup, Waterloo	C1	Clara Honsinger (USA)	Team S&M CX	
8 October 2022	(Estonia) Bike Fanatics Keila CX Day 1, Keila	C2	Suzanne Verhoeven (BEL)	De Ceuster Bonache CX Cycling Team	
9 October 2022	(France) Brumath Cross Days, Brumath	C2	Leonie Bentveld (NED)	Pauwels Sauzen–Bingoal	
9 October 2022	(Spain) CicloCross XaxanCX–2022, Marín	C2	Laura Verdonschot (BEL)	De Ceuster Bonache CX Cycling Team	
12 October 2022	(Spain) CicloCross Internacional Lago de As Pontes, As Pontes de García Rodríguez	C2	Laura Verdonschot (BEL)	De Ceuster Bonache CX Cycling Team	
14 October 2022	(United States) OZ Cross, Fayetteville	C1	Inge van der Heijden (NED)	777	
15 October 2022	(Spain) CicloCross Internacional Concello de Ribadumia, Ribadumia	C2	Laura Verdonschot (BEL)	De Ceuster Bonache CX Cycling Team	
16 October 2022	(Republic of Ireland) Verge Cross Clonmel, Clonmel	C2	Anna Kay (GBR)	777	
16 October 2022	(Spain) III CicloCross Internacional Con da Romaiña–Concello de Sanxenxo, Sanxenxo	C2	Lucía González Blanco (ESP)	Nesta-MMR CX Team	
16 October 2022	(Switzerland) Internationales Radquer Steinmaur, Steinmaur	C2	Line Burquier (FRA)	Canyon CLLCTV Team	
20 October 2022	(Belgium) Kermiscross, Ardooie	C2	Blanka Vas (HUN)	SD Worx	
22 October 2022	(United States) Kings CX Day 1, Mason	C1	Caroline Mani (FRA)	Alpha Groove Silverthorne	
23 October 2022	(United States) Kings CX Day 2, Mason	C2	Caroline Mani (FRA)	Alpha Groove Silverthorne	
29 October 2022	(Italy) International Cyclocross Increa Brugherio, Brugherio	C2	Sara Casasola (ITA)	Selle Italia Guerciotti Elite	
29 October 2022	(United States) Major Taylor Cross Cup – Day 1, Indianapolis	C2	Hannah Arensman (USA)	Ignition Racing Team	
30 October 2022	(United States) Major Taylor Cross Cup – Day 2, Indianapolis	C2	Sunny Gilbert (USA)	Blue Competition Cycles p/b Build	

=== November ===
Date	Course	Class	Winner	Team	References
1 November 2022	(Belgium) X²O Badkamers Trophy #1, Koppenbergcross, Oudenaarde	C1	Fem van Empel (NED)	Pauwels Sauzen–Bingoal	
1 November 2022	(France) Cyclo-cross International de Dijon, Dijon	C2	Solenne Billouin (FRA)	Team Guevel Articréationse	
1 November 2022	(Italy) 2e Trofeo Citta' di Firenze, Florence	C2	Sara Casasola (ITA)	Selle Italia Guerciotti Elite	
1 November 2022	(Spain) Elorrioko Basqueland Ziklokrosa, Elorrio	C1	Cancelled		
4 November 2022	(Costa Rica) 2022 Pan American Cyclo-cross Championships, San José	CC	Raylyn Nuss (USA)	STF Racing	
6 November 2022	(Belgium) 2022 UEC European Cyclo-cross Championships, Namur	CC	Fem van Empel (NED)	Pauwels Sauzen–Bingoal	
12 November 2022	(United States) The Northampton International – Day 1, Northampton	C2	Austin Killips (USA)	Nice Bikes CX Team	
13 November 2022	(France) Cyclo-cross Auxerre, Auxerre	C2	Anaïs Morichon (FRA)	Arkéa Pro Cycling Team	
13 November 2022	(Japan) Rapha Supercross Nobeyama, Nagano	C2	Sae Ogawa (JPN)		
13 November 2022	(United States) The Northampton International – Day 2, Northampton	C2	Raylyn Nuss (USA)	STF Racing	
19 November 2022	(United Kingdom) Andover Supercross, Andover	C2	Millie Couzens (GBR)	Crelan-Fristads	
19 November 2022	(United States) North Carolina Grand Prix – Day 1, Hendersonville	C2	Jolanda Neff (SUI)	Trek–Segafredo	
20 November 2022	(Japan) Kansai Cyclo Cross Biwako Grand Prix, Kusatsu	C2	Eri Yonamine (JPN)	Human Powered Health	
20 November 2022	(United States) North Carolina Grand Prix – Day 2, Hendersonville	C2	Caroline Mani (FRA)	Alpha Bicycle/Groove Subaru CX	
26 November 2022	(Belgium) X²O Badkamers Trophy #2, Kortrijk	C2	Marianne Vos (NED)	Team Jumbo–Visma	
26 November 2022	(France) Cyclo-cross de Gernelle, Gernelle	C2	Line Burquier (FRA)	Canyon CLLCTV	
26 November 2022	(Italy) Gran Premio Val Fontanabuona, San Colombano Certenoli	C2	Silvia Persico (ITA)	Valcar–Travel & Service	
27 November 2022	(Canada) Bear Crossing Grand Prix, Langford	C2	Isabella Holmgren (CAN)	Stimulus-Orbea	
27 November 2022	(France) Cyclo-cross de La Grandville, La Grandville	C2	Maghalie Rochette (CAN)	Specialized	
27 November 2022	(Spain) VIII Abadiñoko Udala Saria, Abadiño	C2	Cancelled		

=== December ===
Date	Course	Class	Winner	Team	Reference
4 December 2022	(Italy) 38^ GP Città di Vittorio Veneto, Vittorio Veneto	C2	Silvia Persico (ITA)	Valcar–Travel & Service	
8 December 2022	(Italy) Ciclocross del Ponte, Faè	C2	Silvia Persico (ITA)	Valcar–Travel & Service	
10 December 2022	(Belgium) Exact Cross Trophy #4. Robotland Cyclocross, Essen	C2	Aniek van Alphen (NED)	777	
11 December 2022	(Italy) Gran Premio Internazionale CX Città di Jesolo, Jesolo	C2	Silvia Persico (ITA)	Valcar–Travel & Service	
11 December 2022	(Spain) Ziklokross Igorre, Igorre	C2	Lucía González (ESP)	Nesta - MMR CX Team	
17 December 2022	(Japan) Utsunomiya Cyclo Cross Day1, Utsunomiya	C2	Sae Ogawa (JPN)		
18 December 2022	(France) Cyclo-cross d'Orée d'Anjou, Saint-Sauveur-de-Landemont	C2	Solenne Billouin (FRA)	Team Guevel Articreations	
18 December 2022	(Japan) Utsunomiya Cyclo Cross Day2, Utsunomiya	C2	Sae Ogawa (JPN)		
23 December 2022	(Belgium) Exact Cross Trophy #5. Zilvermeercross, Mol	C2	Shirin van Anrooij (NED)	Baloise–Trek Lions	
28 December 2022	(Italy) Turin International Cyclocross, San Francesco al Campo	C2	Rebecca Gariboldi (ITA)	Team Cingolani	
30 December 2022	(Belgium) Exact Cross Trophy #6. Azencross, Loenhout	C1	Shirin van Anrooij (NED)	Baloise–Trek Lions	

=== January ===
Date	Course	Class	Winner	Team	Reference
1 January 2023	(Belgium) X²O Badkamers Trophy #3, Grand Prix Sven Nys, Baal	C1	Fem van Empel (NED)	Pauwels Sauzen–Bingoal	
3 January 2023	(Belgium) X²O Badkamers Trophy #4, Herentals	C2	Puck Pieterse (NED)	Alpecin–Premier Tech	
5 January 2023	(Belgium) X²O Badkamers Trophy #5, Duinencross Koksijde, Koksijde	C1	Shirin van Anrooij (NED)	Baloise–Trek Lions	
7 January 2023	(United Kingdom) Clanfield Cross, Clanfield	C2	Ella Maclean-Howell (GBR)	Hope Factory Racing	
16 January 2023	(Belgium) Nationale Cyclo-Cross Otegem, Otegem	C2	Marion Norbert-Riberolle (BEL)	Crelan-Fristads	
21 January 2023	(Belgium) Exact Cross Trophy #7. Kasteelcross, Zonnebeke	C2	Denise Betsema (NED)	Pauwels Sauzen–Altez Industriebouw Cycling Team	
21 January 2023	(Italy) 43° Gran Premio Mamma e Papa' Guerciotti am, Cremona	C2	Rebecca Gariboldi (ITA)	Team Cingolani Specialized	
28 January 2023	(Belgium) X²O Badkamers Trophy #6, Flandriencross, Hamme	C1	Fem van Empel (NED)	Team Jumbo–Visma	

=== February ===
Date	Course	Class	Winner	Team	Reference
5 February 2023	(Netherlands) 2023 UCI Cyclo-cross World Championships, Hoogerheide	WC	Fem van Empel (NED)	Team Jumbo–Visma	
8 February 2023	(Belgium) Parkcross, Maldegem	C2	Annemarie Worst (NED)	777	
12 February 2023	(Belgium) X²O Badkamers Trophy #7, Krawatencross, Lille	C1	Fem van Empel (NED)	Team Jumbo–Visma	
18 February 2023	(Belgium) Exact Cross Trophy #8, Waaslandcross, Sint-Niklaas	C2	Annemarie Worst (NED)	777	
19 February 2023	(Belgium) X²O Badkamers Trophy #8, Brussels Universities Cross, Brussels	C1	Fem van Empel (NED)	Team Jumbo–Visma	
26 February 2023	(Belgium) Sluitingsprijs Oostmalle, Oostmalle	C1	Annemarie Worst (NED)	777	

== 2022–23 UCI Cyclo-cross World Cup ==
Date	Course	Class	Winner	Team	Reference
9 October 2022	(United States) UCI Cyclo-cross World Cup #1, Waterloo	WC	Fem van Empel (NED)	Pauwels Sauzen–Bingoal	
16 October 2022	(United States) UCI Cyclo-cross World Cup #2, Fayetteville	WC	Fem van Empel (NED)	Pauwels Sauzen–Bingoal	
23 October 2022	(Czech Republic) UCI Cyclo-cross World Cup #3, Tábor	WC	Fem van Empel (NED)	Pauwels Sauzen–Bingoal	
30 October 2022	(Netherlands) UCI Cyclo-cross World Cup #4, Rucphen	WC	Fem van Empel (NED)	Pauwels Sauzen–Bingoal	
13 November 2022	(Netherlands) UCI Cyclo-cross World Cup #5, Hilvarenbeek	WC	Shirin van Anrooij (NED)	Baloise–Trek Lions	
20 November 2022	(Belgium) UCI Cyclo-cross World Cup #6, Overijse	WC	Puck Pieterse (NED)	Alpecin–Premier Tech	
27 November 2022	(Netherlands) UCI Cyclo-cross World Cup #7, Hulst	WC	Puck Pieterse (NED)	Alpecin–Premier Tech	
4 December 2022	(Belgium) UCI Cyclo-cross World Cup #8, Antwerp	WC	Fem van Empel (NED)	Pauwels Sauzen–Bingoal	
11 December 2022	(Republic of Ireland) UCI Cyclo-cross World Cup #9, Dublin	WC	Fem van Empel (NED)	Pauwels Sauzen–Bingoal	
17 December 2022	(Italy) UCI Cyclo-cross World Cup #10, Val di Sole	WC	Puck Pieterse (NED)	Alpecin–Premier Tech	
26 December 2022	(Belgium) UCI Cyclo-cross World Cup #11, Dendermonde	WC	Shirin van Anrooij (NED)	Baloise–Trek Lions	
8 January 2023	(Belgium) UCI Cyclo-cross World Cup #12, Zonhoven	WC	Shirin van Anrooij (NED)	Baloise–Trek Lions	
22 January 2023	(Spain) UCI Cyclo-cross World Cup #13, Benidorm	WC	Fem van Empel (NED)	Team Jumbo–Visma	
29 January 2023	(France) UCI Cyclo-cross World Cup #14, Besançon	WC	Puck Pieterse (NED)	Alpecin–Premier Tech	

== 2023 UCI Cyclo-cross World Championships ==
Country	Date	Elite	U23	Juniors
Netherlands	4–5 February 2023	Men's; (gold) Mathieu van der Poel (NED); (silver) Wout van Aert (BEL); (bronze) Eli Iserbyt (BEL); Women's; (gold) Fem van Empel (NED); (silver) Puck Pieterse (NED); (bronze) Lucinda Brand (NED)	Men's; (gold) Thibau Nys (BEL); (silver) Tibor Del Grosso (NED); (bronze) Witse Meeussen (BEL); Women's; (gold) Shirin van Anrooij (NED); (silver) Zoe Bäckstedt (GBR); (bronze) Kristyna Zemanová (CZE)	Men's; (gold) Léo Bisiaux (FRA); (silver) Senna Remijn (NED); (bronze) Yordi Corsus (BEL); Women's; (gold) Isabella Holmgren (CAN); (silver) Ava Holmgren (CAN); (bronze) Célia Gery (FRA)

== National Cups ==
=== 2022 AusCycling CX National Series ===
Date	Course	Class	Winner	Team	Reference
4 June 2022	(Australia) AusCycing CX National Series #1, Adelaide	NC	Rebecca Locke (AUS)	The Fitzroy Revolution MTB	
5 June 2022	(Australia) AusCycing CX National Series #2, Adelaide	NC	Rebecca Locke (AUS)	The Fitzroy Revolution MTB	
18 June 2022	(Australia) AusCycing CX National Series #3, Brisbane	NC	Rebecca Locke (AUS)	The Fitzroy Revolution MTB	
19 June 2022	(Australia) AusCycing CX National Series #4, Brisbane	NC	Rebecca Locke (AUS)	The Fitzroy Revolution MTB	
9 July 2022	(Australia) AusCycing CX National Series #5, Melbourne	NC	Rebecca Locke (AUS)	The Fitzroy Revolution MTB	
10 July 2022	(Australia) AusCycing CX National Series #6, Melbourne	NC	Miranda Griffiths (AUS)	Ballarat / Sebastopol CC	

=== Austrian Cyclocross Cup 2022–23 ===
Date	Course	Class	Winner	Team	Reference
24 September 2022	(Lower Austria) BikeSchneiderei Cross – Austrian Cyclocross Cup #1, Maria Enzersdorf	NC/C2	Nadja Heigl (AUT)	KTM Alchemist Racing Team	
8 October	(Lower Austria) Querfeldeinrennen durchs Stadion – Austrian Cyclocross Cup #2, Pernitz	NC/C1	Silke Mair (AUT)	Team Felt–Felbermayr	
9 October 2022	(Lower Austria) Tage des Querfeldeinsports – Austrian Cyclocross Cup #3, Ternitz	NC/C1	Nadja Heigl (AUT)	KTM Alchemist Racing Team	
16 October 2022	(Lower Austria) 7. King & Queen of Seeschlacht – Austrian Cyclocross Cup #4, Langenzersdorf	NC/C1	Nadja Heigl (AUT)	KTM Alchemist Racing Team	
22 October 2022	Kraftwerkscross Day 1 – Austrian Cyclocross Cup #5, Vienna	NC/C2	Silke Mair (AUT)	Team Felt–Felbermayr	
23 October 2022	Kraftwerkscross Day 2 – Austrian Cyclocross Cup #6, Vienna	NC/C1	Silke Mair (AUT)	Team Felt–Felbermayr	
30 October 2022	(Lower Austria) St. Pöltner Querfeldein im Kaiserwald – Austrian Cyclocross Cup #7, Sankt Pölten	NC	Nadja Heigl (AUT)	KTM Alchemist Racing Team	
1 November 2022	(Lower Austria) Spusu Kreuttal Cross – Austrian Cyclocross Cup #8, Unterolberndorf	NC	Nadja Heigl (AUT)	KTM Alchemist Racing Team	
19 November 2022	(Salzburg (state)) Radcrossrennen – Austrian Cyclocross Cup #9, Straßwalchen	NC	Silke Mair (AUT)	Team Felt–Felbermayr	
20 November 2022	(Upper Austria) RCO Crossrennen – Austrian Cyclocross Cup #10, Wels	NC	Silke Mair (AUT)	Team Felt–Felbermayr	
27 November 2022	(Lower Austria) Radcross – Austrian Cyclocross Cup #11, Böheimkirchen	NC	Cornelia Holland (AUT)	Naturfreunde Wilhelmsburg-Göblasbruck	
10 December 2022	(Upper Austria) Bad Ischler Radquerfeldein – Austrian Cyclocross Cup #12, Bad Ischl	NC	Clara Sommer (AUT)	ARBÖ PopaFlo Freistadt	
11 December 2022	(Upper Austria) Crossrennen – Austrian Cyclocross Cup #13, Wels	NC	Silke Mair (AUT)	Team Felt–Felbermayr	
6 January 2023	(Lower Austria) 3KöniXcrosS – Austrian Cyclocross Cup #14, Sankt Pölten	NC	Nadja Heigl (AUT)	KTM Alchemist Racing Team	

=== Belgian Cyclocross Cup 2022–23 ===
Date	Course	Class	Winner	Team	Reference
29 October 2022	(Belgium) Superprestige #1, Oostkamp	C1	Denise Betsema (NED)	Pauwels Sauzen–Bingoal	
11 November 2022	(Belgium) Superprestige #2, Jaarmarktcross, Niel	C1	Ceylin del Carmen Alvarado (NED)	Alpecin–Premier Tech	
19 November 2022	(Belgium) Superprestige #3, Merksplas	C1	Ceylin del Carmen Alvarado (NED)	Alpecin–Premier Tech	
3 December 2022	(Belgium) Superprestige #4, Gavere	C1	Aniek van Alphen (NED)	777	
27 December 2022	(Belgium) Superprestige #5, Heusden-Zolder	C1	Ceylin del Carmen Alvarado (NED)	Alpecin–Premier Tech	
28 December 2022	(Belgium) Superprestige #6, Diegem	C1	Puck Pieterse (NED)	Alpecin–Premier Tech	
7 January 2023	(Belgium) Superprestige #7, Gullegem	C2	Ceylin del Carmen Alvarado (NED)	Alpecin–Premier Tech	
11 February 2023	(Belgium) Superprestige #8, Noordzeecross, Middelkerke	C1	Ceylin del Carmen Alvarado (NED)	Alpecin–Premier Tech	

=== Czech Cyclocross Cup 2022–23 ===
Date	Course	Class	Winner	Team	Reference
28 September 2022	(Czech Republic) Toi Toi Cup #1, Holé Vrchy	C2	Blanka Vas (HUN)	SD Worx	
1 October 2022	(Czech Republic) Toi Toi Cup #2, Hlinsko	C2	Blanka Vas (HUN)	SD Worx	
8 October 2022	(Czech Republic) Toi Toi Cup #3, Jičín	C2	Blanka Vas (HUN)	SD Worx	
12 November 2022	(Czech Republic) Toi Toi Cup #4, Veselí nad Lužnicí	C2	Kristýna Zemanová (CZE)	Brilon Racing Team MB	
13 November 2022	(Czech Republic) Toi Toi Cup #5, Chýnov	NC	Pavla Havlíková (CZE)	LAWI junior team	
17 November 2022	(Czech Republic) Toi Toi Cup #6, Slaný	C2	Kristýna Zemanová (CZE)	Brilon Racing Team MB	
26 November 2022	(Czech Republic) Toi Toi Cup #7, Čáslav	NC	Cancelled		
3 December 2022	(Czech Republic) Toi Toi Cup #8, Kolín	C2	Vanda Dlasková (CZE)	TJ Auto Škoda MB	
10 December 2022	(Czech Republic) Toi Toi Cup #9, Rýmařov	C2	Pavla Havlíková (CZE)	LAWI junior team	

=== Danish Cyclocross Cup 2022–2023 ===
Date	Course	Class	Winner	Team	Reference
8 October 2022	(Denmark) Danish Cyclocross Cup #1, Roskilde	NC	Mie Nordlund Pedersen (DEN)	Holte MTB Klub	
29 October 2022	(Denmark) Danish Cyclocross Cup #2, Aarhus	NC	Mie Nordlund Pedersen (DEN)	Holte MTB Klub	
30 October 2022	(Denmark) Danish Cyclocross Cup #3, Aarhus	NC	Mie Nordlund Pedersen (DEN)	Holte MTB Klub	
6 November 2022	(Denmark) Danish Cyclocross Cup #4, Odense	NC	Ann-Dorthe Lisbygd (DEN)	Dansk Mountainbike Klub	
3 December 2022	(Denmark) Danish Cyclocross Cup #5, Holbæk	NC	Ann-Dorthe Lisbygd (DEN)	Dansk Mountainbike Klub	
8 January	(Denmark) Danish Cyclocross Cup #6, Kalundborg	NC	Ann-Dorthe Lisbygd (DEN)	Dansk Mountainbike Klub	

=== Estonian Cyclocross Cup 2022–23 ===
Date	Course	Class	Winner	Team	Reference
25 September 2022	(Estonia) Viljandi CX – Estonian Cyclocross Cup #1, Viljandi	NC	Merili Sirvel (EST)	Rakvere Rattaklubi Siplased	
1 October 2022	(Estonia) Elva CX – Estonian Cyclocross Cup #2, Bensheim	NC	Merili Sirvel (EST)	Rakvere Rattaklubi Siplased	
15 October 2022	(Estonia) Rapla CX – Estonian Cyclocross Cup #3, Rapla	NC	Mari-Liis Mõttus (EST)	Haanja Rattaklubi	
16 October 2022	(Estonia) Tallinn CX – Estonian Cyclocross Cup #4, Tallinn	NC	Mari-Liis Mõttus (EST)	Haanja Rattaklubi	
29 October 2022	(Estonia) Rakke CX – Estonian Cyclocross Cup #5, Rakke	NC	Elisabeth Ebras (EST)	KJK	
5 November 2022	(Estonia) Otepää CX – Estonian Cyclocross Cup #6, Otepää	NC	Annabrit Prants (EST)	KJK	

=== Finnish Cyclocross Cup 2022 ===
Date	Course	Class	Winner	Team	Reference
10 September 2022	(Finland) Keinukallio L5 – Finnish Cyclocross Cup #1, Kerava	NC	Anniina Ahtosalo (FIN)	Uno-X Pro Cycling Team	
18 September 2022	(Finland) Kouvola L5 – Finnish Cyclocross Cup #2, Helsinki	NC	Anniina Ahtosalo (FIN)	Uno-X Pro Cycling Team	
1 October 2022	(Finland) Olari - L5 – Finnish Cyclocross Cup #3, Helsinki	NC	Anniina Hakkarainen (FIN)	IBD Cycling	
8 October 2022	(Finland) Pori L5 – Finnish Cyclocross Cup #4, Helsinki	NC	Minna-Maria Kangas (FIN)	Bingoal Pauwels Sauces WB	
15 October 2022	(Finland) Lappeenranta L5 – Finnish Cyclocross Cup #5, Helsinki	NC	Lotte Borremans (FIN)	Rajamäen Kehitys	
29 October 2022	(Finland) Tuusula L5 – Finnish Cyclocross Cup #6, Helsinki	NC	Viivi Turpeinen (FIN)	Korson Kaiku	
5 November 2022	(Finland) Porvoo L5 – Finnish Cyclocross Cup #7, Helsinki	NC	Anniina Hakkarainen (FIN)	IBD Cycling	
20 November 2022	(Finland) Helsinki L5 – Finnish Cyclocross Cup #8, Helsinki	NC	Anniina Hakkarainen (FIN)	IBD Cycling	

=== 2022–23 Coupe de France Cyclo-cross ===
Date	Course	Class	Winner	Team	Reference
22 October 2022	Coupe de France Cyclo-cross #1, Nommay	C2	Clara Honsinger (USA)	Team S&M CX	
22 October 2022	Coupe de France Cyclo-cross #2, Nommay	C2	Clara Honsinger (USA)	Team S&M CX	
19 November 2022	Coupe de France Cyclo-cross #3, Camors	C2	Anaïs Morichon (FRA)	Arkéa Pro Cycling Team	
20 November 2022	Coupe de France Cyclo-cross #4, Camors	C2	Anaïs Morichon (FRA)	Arkéa Pro Cycling Team	
3 December 2022	Coupe de France Cyclo-cross #5, Troyes	C2	Lauriane Duraffourg (FRA)	AS Bike Racing	
4 December 2022	Coupe de France Cyclo-cross #6, Troyes	C2	Anaïs Morichon (FRA)	Arkéa Pro Cycling Team	

=== Bikebeat German Bundesliga CycloCross 2022/23 ===
Date	Course	Class	Winner	Team	Reference
10 September 2022	(Germany) 4 Bikes Festival CX Race – Bundesliga CycloCross #1, Lützelbach	NC/C2	Marie Schreiber (LUX)	Tormans CX Team	
11 September 2022	(Germany) Internationaler GGEW Grand Prix – Bundesliga CycloCross #2, Bensheim	NC/C2	Marie Schreiber (LUX)	Tormans CX Team	
8 October 2022	(Germany) Bundesliga CycloCross Cup #3, Bad Salzdetfurth	NC	Stefanie Paul (GER)	STEVENS Racing Team	
9 October 2022	(Germany) International Cyclo-Cross - Bad Salzdetfurth – Bundesliga CycloCross Cup #4, Bad Salzdetfurth	NC/C1	Aniek van Alphen (NED)	777	
16 October 2022	(Germany) Rund um den Lohner Aussichtsturm – Bundesliga CycloCross Cup #5, Lohne	NC	Stefanie Paul (GER)	STEVENS Racing Team	
22 October 2022	(Germany) 2. QuerFeldRhein – Bundesliga CycloCross Cup #6, Düsseldorf	NC	Karen Verhestraeten (BEL)	IKO-Crelan	
12 November 2022	(Germany) Vaihinger Radcross – Bundesliga CycloCross Cup #7, Stuttgart	NC	Stefanie Paul (GER)	STEVENS Racing Team	
13 November 2022	(Germany) Magstadter Radcross – Bundesliga CycloCross Cup #8, Magstadt	NC	Stefanie Paul (GER)	STEVENS Racing Team	
3 December 2022	(Germany) Königshammer Cross – Bundesliga CycloCross Cup #11, Baiersbronn	NC	Lisa Heckmann (GER)	Müsing - Kurschat Consulting Cyclocross Team	
4 December 2022	(Germany) Großen Preis der Badischen – Bundesliga CycloCross Cup #12, Kehl	NC	Lisa Heckmann (GER)	Müsing - Kurschat Consulting Cyclocross Team	
11 December 2022	(Germany) Rund um die Chemnitzer Radrennbahn – Bundesliga CycloCross Cup #13, Chemnitz	NC	Stefanie Paul (GER)	STEVENS Racing Team	
18 December 2022	(Germany) 43. Harburger Weihnachtspreis – Bundesliga CycloCross Cup #14, Hamburg	NC	Larissa Luttuschka (GER)	STEVENS Racing Team	
8 January 2023	(Germany) Preis der Stadt Vechta – Bundesliga CycloCross Cup #15, Lohne	NC	Judith Krahl (GER)	Heizomat Radteam p/b Kloster Kitchen	

=== 2022–23 British National Trophy Series ===
Date	Course	Class	Winner	Team	Reference
9 October 2022	(United Kingdom) British National Trophy Series Round #1, Derby	C2	Anna Kay (GBR)	777	
23 October 2022	(United Kingdom) British National Trophy Series Round #2, Falkirk	C2	Millie Couzens (GBR)	Crelan-Fristads	
30 October 2022	(United Kingdom) British National Trophy Series Round #3, South Shields	C2	Anna Kay (GBR)	777	
20 November 2022	(United Kingdom) British National Trophy Series Round #4, Paignton	C2	Annie Last (GBR)	KMC Orbea	
18 December 2022	(United Kingdom) British National Trophy Series Round #5, Skipton	C2	Ella Maclean-Howell (GBR)	Hope Factory Racing	
8 January 2023	(United Kingdom) British National Trophy Series Round #6, Gravesend	C2	Millie Couzens (GBR)	Crelan-Fristads	

=== 2022 Cyclo-cross Magyar Kupa ===
Date	Course	Class	Winner	Team	Reference
1 October 2022	(Hungary) Cyclo-cross Magyar Kupa #1, Zalakaros	NC	Viktória Szekeres (HUN)	KTM Team Hungary	
16 October 2022	(Hungary) Cyclo-cross Magyar Kupa #2, Iszkaszentgyörgy	NC	Niké Péteri (HUN)	Ride for Women	
13 November 2022	(Hungary) Cyclo-cross Magyar Kupa #3, Budapest	NC	Cancelled		
27 November 2022	(Hungary) Cyclo-cross Magyar Kupa #4, Debrecen	NC	Niké Péteri (HUN)	Ride for Women	
18 December 2022	(Hungary) Cyclo-cross Magyar Kupa #5, Kecskemét	NC	Niké Péteri (HUN)	Ride for Women	

=== 2022 Irish Cyclocross National Series ===
Date	Course	Class	Winner	Team	Reference
19 November 2022	(Republic of Ireland) Westport CC – Irish Cyclocross National Series #1, Westport	NC	Caoimhe May (IRL)	Orwell Wheelers CC	
26 November 2022	(Republic of Ireland) Upperchurch Drombane CC – Irish Cyclocross National Series #2, Thurles	NC	Stephanie Roche (IRL)	Scott Bright Motor Group	
28 December 2022	(Republic of Ireland) Bellurgan Wheelers – Irish Cyclocross National Series #3, Jenkinstown	NC	Maria Larkin (IRL)		
7 January 2023	(Republic of Ireland) Velocity Road Club – Irish Cyclocross National Series #4, Portadown	NC	Áine Doherty (IRL)	VC Glendale	

=== 2022 Giro d'Italia Cross ===
Date	Course	Class	Winner	Team	Reference
2 October 2022	(Italy) Giro d'Italia Cross #1, Corridonia	NC	Sara Casasola (ITA)	Selle Italia Guerciotti Elite	
9 October 2022	(Italy) Giro d'Italia Cross #2, Osoppo	NC	Sara Casasola (ITA)	Selle Italia Guerciotti Elite	
16 October 2022	(Italy) Giro d'Italia Cross #3, Sant'Elpidio a Mare	NC	Rebecca Gariboldi (ITA)	Team Cingolani	
30 October 2022	(Italy) Giro d'Italia Cross #4, Follonica	C2	Rebecca Gariboldi (ITA)	Team Cingolani	
13 November 2022	(Italy) Giro d'Italia Cross #5, Ovindoli	NC	Alessia Bulleri (ITA)	Cycling Cafe' Racing Team	
18 December 2022	(Italy) Giro d'Italia Cross #6, Gallipoli	NC	Rebecca Gariboldi (ITA)	Team Cingolani	

=== 2022 Lithuanian Velo CX Cup ===
Date	Course	Class	Winner	Team	Reference
25 September 2022	(Lithuania) Velo CX #1, Vilnius	NC	Tatjana Petrauskienė (LTU)	Antaris Team	
9 October 2022	(Lithuania) Velo CX #2, Vilnius	NC	Tatjana Petrauskienė (LTU)	Antaris Team	
16 October 2022	(Lithuania) Velo CX #3, Vilnius	NC	Gabrielė Andrašiūnienė (LTU)	S-Sportas SK	
6 November 2022	(Lithuania) Velo CX #4, Vilnius	NC	Elžbieta Seliavaitė (LTU)	Sporto klubas Greitis	

=== ŠKODA Coupe de Louxembourg Cyclo-cross 2022–23 ===
Date	Course	Class	Winner	Team	Reference
1 October 2022	(Luxembourg) Urban Night Cross CT Kayldall – ŠKODA Coupe de Louxembourg Cyclo-cross #1, Reckange-sur-Mess	NC	Layla Barthels (LUX)	LP 07 Schifflange	
9 October 2022	(Luxembourg) GP Garage Thommes – ŠKODA Coupe de Louxembourg Cyclo-cross #2, Dippach	NC	Anouk Schmitz (LUX)	CT Atertdaul	
15 October 2022	(Luxembourg) Grand Prix Securitec – ŠKODA Coupe de Louxembourg Cyclo-cross #3, Kayl	NC	Isabelle Klein (LUX)	CT Toproad Roeserbann	
23 October 2022	(Luxembourg) Munnerëffer Velosfrënn – ŠKODA Coupe de Louxembourg Cyclo-cross #4, Mondorf-les-Bains	NC	Isabelle Klein (LUX)	CT Toproad Roeserbann	
29 October 2022	(Luxembourg) Grand-prix de la Commune de Contern – ŠKODA Coupe de Louxembourg Cyclo-cross #5, Contern	NC/C2	Cancelled		
6 November 2022	(Luxembourg) VF Gusty Bruch – ŠKODA Coupe de Louxembourg Cyclo-cross #6, Brouch	NC	Layla Barthels (LUX)	LP 07 Schifflange	
13 November 2022	(Luxembourg) Grand Prix SNOOZE – ŠKODA Coupe de Louxembourg Cyclo-cross #7, Leudelange	NC	Cancelled		
20 November 2022	(Luxembourg) LG Belvaux – ŠKODA Coupe de Louxembourg Cyclo-cross #8, Sanem	NC	Isabelle Klein (LUX)	CT Toproad Roeserbann	
27 November 2022	(Luxembourg) GP Chauffage Sanitaire Baumert – ŠKODA Coupe de Louxembourg Cyclo-cross #9, Leudelange	NC	Isabelle Klein (LUX)	CT Toproad Roeserbann	
11 December 2022	(Luxembourg) Cyclocross régional Tooltime Préizerdaul – ŠKODA Coupe de Louxembourg Cyclo-cross #10, Préizerdaul	NC	Isabelle Klein (LUX)	CT Toproad Roeserbann	
18 December 2022	(Luxembourg) 17eme Nordstaad Cyclo-Cross régional – ŠKODA Coupe de Louxembourg Cyclo-cross #11, Ettelbruck	NC	Isabelle Klein (LUX)	CT Toproad Roeserbann	
1 January 2023	(Luxembourg) Grand Prix Garage Collé – ŠKODA Coupe de Louxembourg Cyclo-cross #12, Pétange	NC/C2	Manon Bakker (NED)	Crelan-Fristads	
7 January 2023	(Luxembourg) LP 07 Schifflange – ŠKODA Coupe de Louxembourg Cyclo-cross #13, Schifflange	NC	Lisa Heckmann (GER)	VC Darmstadt/Stevens Frauen R. T.	
21 January 2023	(Luxembourg) Cyclocross Schëffleng – ŠKODA Coupe de Louxembourg Cyclo-cross #14, Hesperange	NC	Liv Wenzel (LUX)	CT Atertdaul	

=== NorgesCup CX Cup 2022 ===
Date	Course	Class	Winner	Team	Reference
24 September 2022	(Norway) NorgesCup CX Cup #1, Oslo	NC	Thea Siggerud (NOR)	Soon CK	
25 September 2022	(Norway) NorgesCup CX Cup #2, Oslo	NC	Thea Siggerud (NOR)	Soon CK	
8 October 2022	(Norway) Føyka Kross #1 – NorgesCup CX Cup #3, Asker	NC	Thea Siggerud (NOR)	Soon CK	
9 October 2022	(Norway) Føyka Kross #2 – NorgesCup CX Cup #4, Asker	NC	Thea Siggerud (NOR)	Soon CK	
22 October 2022	(Norway) StudentCross #1 – NorgesCup CX Cup #5, Halden	NC	Thea Siggerud (NOR)	Soon CK	
23 October 2022	(Norway) StudentCross #2 – NorgesCup CX Cup #6, Halden	NC	Linn Sofie Mohn (NOR)	Asker CK	
29 October 2022	(Norway) SkanseCross #1 – NorgesCup CX Cup #7, Drøbak	NC	Oda Laforce (NOR)	IF Frøy	
30 October 2022	(Norway) SkanseCross #2 – NorgesCup CX Cup #8, Drøbak	NC	Thea Siggerud (NOR)	Soon CK	
5 November 2022	(Norway) Spikkestad røyk, rock og Kross #1 – NorgesCup CX Cup #9, Spikkestad	NC	Thea Siggerud (NOR)	Soon CK	
6 November 2022	(Norway) Spikkestad røyk, rock og Kross #2 – NorgesCup CX Cup #10, Spikkestad	NC	Malin Karlsen (NOR)	Soon CK	
12 November 2022	(Norway) Sykkelkross #1 – NorgesCup CX Cup #11, Sandnes	NC	Susanne Andersen (NOR)	Stavanger CK	
13 November 2022	(Norway) Sykkelkross #2 – NorgesCup CX Cup #12, Sandnes	NC	Stine Borgli (NOR)	CK Victoria	

=== Netherlands Cyclocross Cup 2022 ===
Date	Course	Class	Winner	Team	Reference
17 September 2022	(Netherlands) Kleeberg Cross, Gulpen-Wittem	C2	Inge van der Heijden (NED)	777	
8 October 2022	Boverhoff Nationale Cyclocross Heerderstrand 2022 – Netherlands Cyclocross Cup #2, Heerde	NC	Esther van der Burg (NED)	Proximus-Alphamotorhomes	
16 October 2022	(Netherlands) GP Oisterwijk, Oisterwijk	C2	Puck Pieterse (NED)	Alpecin–Premier Tech	
22 October 2022	tevens Nationale veldrit Rotterdam – Netherlands Cyclocross Cup #4, Rotterdam	NC	Larissa Hartog (NED)	Giant Liv Benelux Offroad Team	
25 October 2022	(Netherlands) Kiremko Nacht van Woerden, Woerden	C2	Blanka Vas (HUN)	SD Worx	
30 October 2022	Nationale Veldrit Almelo – Netherlands Cyclocross Cup #6, Almelo	NC	Kimberly Boven (NED)		
19 November 2022	Janet Memorial Veldrit van Hilversum – Netherlands Cyclocross Cup #7, Laren	NC	Ilse Pluimers (NED)	AG Insurance–Soudal	
20 November 2022	2e Van den Akker Aqua Service Veldrit– Netherlands Cyclocross Cup #8, Heeswijk-Dinther	NC	Emma Brouwer (NED)		
27 November 2022	Nationale Cross CC75 Nijverdal – Netherlands Cyclocross Cup #9, Nijverdal	NC	Cancelled		
10 December 2022	TC - 41e Nationale Veldrit van Amersfoort – Netherlands Cyclocross Cup #10, Amersfoort	NC	Kimberly Boven (NED)		
11 December 2022	Veldrit Hoogeveen – Netherlands Cyclocross Cup #11, Hoogeveen	NC	Sera Gademan (NED)	WV Schijndel Women U23	
18 December 2022	Nationale Veldrit van Boxtel – Netherlands Cyclocross Cup #12, Boxtel	NC	Kimberly Boven (NED)		
26 December 2022	Kerstcross – Netherlands Cyclocross Cup #13, Norg	NC	Maaike De Heij (NED)		
8 January 2023	Kasteelcross Vorden – Netherlands Cyclocross Cup #14, Vorden	NC	Anne Tauber (NED)	Orbea Factory Team	

=== Puchar Polski CX 2022 ===
Date	Course	Class	Winner	Team	Reference
9 October 2022	(Poland) Puchar Polski CX #1, Choszczno	NC	Zuzanna Krzystała (POL)	Pho3nix Cycling Team	
15 October 2022	(Poland) Puchar Polski CX #2, Tokarnia	NC	Dominika Włodarczyk (POL)	Fundacja Brzeźna Bentkowska	
16 October 2022	(Poland) Puchar Polski CX #3, Środa Wielkopolska	NC	Adrianna Osińska (POL)	Wysepka Team	
23 October 2022	(Poland) Puchar Polski CX #4, Jelenia Góra	NC	Laura Wójcik (POL)	LKS Atom Dzierżoniów	
29 October 2022	(Poland) Mikolow 800th Anniversary Cup/Puchar 800-lecie Mikołowa, Mikołów	C2	Pavla Havlíková (CZE)	LAWI Junior Team	
30 October 2022	(Poland) Puchar Polski CX #6, Kluczbork	NC	Zuzanna Krzystała (POL)	Pho3nix Cycling Team	
5 November 2022	(Poland) Puchar Polski CX #7, Włoszakowice	NC	Zuzanna Krzystała (POL)	Pho3nix Cycling Team	
6 November 2022	(Poland) Puchar Polski CX #8, Zwierzyn	NC	Zuzanna Krzystała (POL)	Pho3nix Cycling Team	
11 November 2022	(Poland) Puchar Polski CX #9, Częstochowa	NC	Nikola Bajgerová (CZE)	ATOM Deweloper Posciellux.pl Wrocław	
12 November 2022	(Poland) Puchar Polski CX #10, Szczekociny	NC	Antonina Białek (POL)	Warszawski Klub Kolarski	
13 November 2022	(Poland) Puchar Polski CX #11, Turawa	NC	Nikola Bajgerová (CZE)	ATOM Deweloper Posciellux.pl Wrocław	
19 November 2022	(Poland) Puchar Polski CX #12, Jelcz-Laskowice	NC	Dominika Włodarczyk (POL)	ATOM Deweloper Posciellux.pl Wrocław	
20 November 2022	(Poland) Puchar Polski CX #13, Złotów	NC	Cancelled		
26 November 2022	(Poland) Suszec Cross – Puchar Polski CX #14, Suszec	C2/NC	Cancelled		
27 November 2022	(Poland) XXIX Bryksy Cross Gościęcin – Puchar Polski CX #14, Gościęcin	C2/NC	Zuzanna Krzystała (POL)	Pho3nix Cycling Team	
3 December 2022	(Poland) Puchar Polski CX #15, Bieganów	NC	Zuzanna Krzystała (POL)	Pho3nix Cycling Team	
4 December 2022	(Poland) Puchar Polski CX #16, Słubice	NC	Zuzanna Krzystała (POL)	Pho3nix Cycling Team	
10 December 2022	(Poland) Puchar Polski CX #17, Władysławowo	NC	Zuzanna Krzystała (POL)	Pho3nix Cycling Team	
11 December 2022	(Poland) Puchar Polski CX #18, Władysławowo	NC	Zuzanna Krzystała (POL)	Pho3nix Cycling Team	

=== Taça de Portugal de Ciclocrosse 2022–23 ===
Date	Course	Class	Winner	Team	Reference
30 October 2022	(Portugal) Ciclocrosse de Melgaço – Portuguese Cyclocross Cup #1, Melgaço	NC	Joana Monteiro (POR)	AXPO/FirstBike Team/Vila do Conde	
13 November 2022	(Portugal) Portuguese Cyclocross Cup #2, Vila Real	NC	Joana Monteiro (POR)	AXPO/FirstBike Team/Vila do Conde	
27 November 2022	(Portugal) 2a Superliga Cro Acporto Ciclocrosse Santo Tirso – Portuguese Cyclocross Cup #3, Santo Tirso	NC	Joana Monteiro (POR)	AXPO/FirstBike Team/Vila do Conde	
17 December 2022	(Portugal) Portuguese Cyclocross Cup #4, Abrantes	NC	Joana Monteiro (POR)	AXPO/FirstBike Team/Vila do Conde	
18 December 2022	(Portugal) Portuguese Cyclocross Cup #5, Ansião	NC	Joana Monteiro (POR)	AXPO/FirstBike Team/Vila do Conde	

=== Cupa Națională de Ciclocros a României 2022 ===
Date	Course	Class	Winner	Team	Reference
12 November 2022	(Romania) Lunca Timișului CX – Romanian Cyclocross Cup #1, Timișoara	C1	Audrey De Keersmaeker (BEL)	De Ceuster Bonache Cycling Team	
26 November 2022	(Romania) Cupa Paradisul Verde – Romanian Cyclocross Cup #2, Corbeanca	NC	Suzanne Hilbert (ROU)	NoMad Mérida CST	
11 December 2022	(Romania) Central Stage – Romanian Cyclocross Cup #3, Făgăraș	NC	Suzanne Hilbert (ROU)	NoMad Mérida CST	

=== Slovak Cyclocross Cup 2022 ===
Date	Course	Class	Winner	Team	Reference
9 October 2022	(Slovakia) Grand Prix Podbrezová – Slovak Cyclocross Cup #1, Podbrezová	C2	Viktória Chladoňová (SVK)	Climberg Sport Team	
15 October 2022	(Slovakia) Grand Prix Dohnany 1 – Slovak Cyclocross Cup #2, Dohňany	C2	Kristýna Zemanová (CZE)	Brilon Racing Team MB	
16 October 2022	(Slovakia) Grand Prix Dohnany 2 – Slovak Cyclocross Cup #3, Dohňany	C2	Kristýna Zemanová (CZE)	Brilon Racing Team MB	
22 October 2022	(Slovakia) Grand Prix Topoľčianky 1–Slovak Cyclocross Cup #4, Topoľčianky	C2	Pavla Havlíková (CZE)	LAWI Junior team	
23 October 2022	(Slovakia) Grand Prix Topoľčianky 2–Slovak Cyclocross Cup #5, Topoľčianky	C2	Pavla Havlíková (CZE)	LAWI Junior team	
17 November 2022	(Slovakia) Grand Prix X-Bionic Samorin 1 – Slovak Cyclocross Cup #6, Šamorín	C2	Pavla Havlíková (CZE)	LAWI Junior team	
19 November 2022	(Slovakia) Grand Prix X-Bionic Samorin 2 – Slovak Cyclocross Cup #7, Šamorín	C1	Kristýna Zemanová (CZE)	Brilon Racing Team MB	
20 November 2022	(Slovakia) Grand Prix Trnava – Slovak Cyclocross Cup #8, Trnava	C2	Kristýna Zemanová (CZE)	Brilon Racing Team MB	

=== Pokal Slovenije v ciklokrosu 2022–2023 ===
Date	Course	Class	Winner	Team	Reference
26 December 2022	(Slovenia) 2. Ciklokros Ljubljana – Pokal Slovenije v ciklokrosu #2, Ljubljana	NC	Tanja Žakelj (SVN)		
15 January 2023	(Slovenia) Ciklokros Ilirska Bistrica – Pokal Slovenije v ciklokrosu #3, Ilirska Bistrica	NC	Cancelled		

=== Copa de España de Ciclocross 2022-2023 ===
Date	Course	Class	Winner	Team	Reference
2 October 2022	(Spain) Copa de España de Ciclocross #1, Gijón	C2	Lucía González (ESP)	Nesta-MMR CX Team	
8 October 2022	(Spain) Copa de España de Ciclocross #2, Pontevedra	C1	Lucía González (ESP)	Nesta-MMR CX Team	
30 October 2022	(Spain) Copa de España de Ciclocross #3, Les Franqueses del Vallès	C2	Sara Cueto Vega (ESP)	Unicaja Banco - Gijón CX Team	
5 November 2022	(Spain) Copa de España de Ciclocross #4, Laudio/Llodio	C1	Lucía González (ESP)	Nesta-MMR CX Team	
6 November 2022	(Spain) Copa de España de Ciclocross #5, Karrantza	C2	Manon Bakker (NED)	Crelan-Fristads	
12–13 November 2022	(Spain) Copa de España de Ciclocross #6, Tarancón	C2	Lucía González (ESP)	Nesta-MMR CX Team	
20 November 2022	(Spain) Copa de España de Ciclocross #7, Alcobendas	C2	Sofia Rodríguez (ESP)	Nesta-MMR CX Team	
17 December 2022	(Spain) Copa de España de Ciclocross #8, Xàtiva	C2	Lucía González (ESP)	Nesta-MMR CX Team	
18 December 2022	(Spain) Copa de España de Ciclocross #9, Valencia	C2	Lucía González (ESP)	Nesta-MMR CX Team	

=== 2022 Swedish National Cyclocross Cup ===
Date	Course	Class	Winner	Team	Reference
15 October 2022	(Sweden) CX Täby Park – Swedish Cyclocross Cup #1, Täby	C2	Suzanne Verhoeven (BEL)	De Ceuster Bonache CX Cycling Team	
16 October 2022	(Sweden) Stockholm cyclocross – Swedish Cyclocross Cup #2, Stockholm	C2	Femke Gort (NED)	Pissei – Groep T.O.M.	
19 November 2022	(Sweden) Varberg cyclocross #1 – Swedish Cyclocross Cup #3, Varberg	NC	Alma Johansson (SWE)	Acrog-Tormans	
20 November 2022	(Sweden) Varberg cyclocross #2 – Swedish Cyclocross Cup #4, Varberg	NC	Agnes Abrahamsson (SWE)	CK Master	

=== Swiss Ciclocross Cup 2022-2023 ===
Date	Course	Class	Winner	Team	Reference
2 October 2022	(Switzerland) Swiss Cyclocross Cup #1 – Radquer Mettmenstetten, Mettmenstetten	C2	Hélène Clauzel (FRA)	AS Bike Racing	
23 October 2022	(Switzerland) Swiss Cyclocross Cup #2-AlperoseQuer Schneisingen, Schneisingen	C2	Rebecca Gariboldi (ITA)	Team Cingolani Specialized	
30 October 2022	(Switzerland) Swiss Cyclocross Cup #3-CX de Bulle, Bulle	C2	Sara Casasola (ITA)	Selle Italia Guerciotti Elite	
13 November 2022	(Switzerland) Radquer Hittnau-Swiss Cyclocross Cup #4, Hittnau	C2	Sara Casasola (ITA)	Selle Italia Guerciotti Elite	
2 January 2023	(Switzerland) Cyclocross Meilen-Swiss Cyclocross Cup #5, Meilen	C2	Silvia Persico (ITA)	Valcar–Travel & Service	

=== USCX Cyclocross Series 2022 ===
Date	Course	Class	Winner	Team	Reference
17 September 2022	(United States) Virginia's Blue Ridge GO Cross – Day 1, Roanoke	C1	Caroline Mani (FRA)	Alpha Groove Silverthorne	
18 September 2022	(United States) Virginia's Blue Ridge GO Cross – Day 2, Roanoke	C2	Caroline Mani (FRA)	Alpha Groove Silverthorne	
24 September 2022	(United States) USPCX Cyclocross – Rochester Cyclocross – Day 1, Rochester	C1	Annemarie Worst (NED)	777	
25 September 2022	(United States) USPCX Cyclocross – Rochester Cyclocross – Day 2, Rochester	C2	Annemarie Worst (NED)	777	
1 October 2022	(United States) USCX Cyclocross – Charm City Cross Day 1, Baltimore	C1	Annemarie Worst (NED)	777	
2 October 2022	(United States) USCX Cyclocross – Charm City Cross Day 2, Baltimore	C2	Annemarie Worst (NED)	777	
5 November 2022	(United States) USPCX Cyclocross – Really Rad Festival of Cyclocross – Day 1, Falmouth	C1	Caroline Mani (FRA)	Alpha Groove Silverthorne	
6 November 2022	(United States) USPCX Cyclocross – Really Rad Festival of Cyclocross – Day 2, Falmouth	C2	Caroline Mani (FRA)	Alpha Groove Silverthorne	

== Number of wins ==
#	Racer	Team	W	CDM	SP	X²O	ETH
1	(Netherlands) Fem van Empel	Pauwels Sauzen–Bingoal	0	1	0	0	2
–	(Netherlands) Annemarie Worst	777	3	0	0	0	0
–	(Hungary) Blanka Vas	SD Worx	3	0	0	0	0
2	(Belgium) Laura Verdonschot	De Ceuster Bonache CX Cycling Team	2	0	0	0	0
–	(France) Caroline Mani	Alpha Groove Silverthorne	2	0	0	0	0
–	(France) Hélène Clauzel	AS Bike Racing	2	0	0	0	0
–	(Luxembourg) Marie Schreiber	Tormans CX Team	2	0	0	0	0
–	(Netherlands) Inge van der Heijden	777	2	0	0	0	0
–	(Spain) Lucía González Blanco	Nesta-MMR CX Team	2	0	0	0	0
3	(Belgium) Suzanne Verhoeven	De Ceuster Bonache CX Cycling Team	1	0	0	0	0
–	(France) Amandine Fouquenet	Arkéa Pro Cycling Team	1	0	0	0	0
–	(United Kingdom) Anna Kay	777	1	0	0	0	0
–	(Netherlands) Leonie Bentveld	Pauwels Sauzen–Bingoal	1	0	0	0	0
–	(Netherlands) Lucinda Brand	Baloise–Trek Lions	1	0	0	0	0
–	(Netherlands) Aniek van Alphen	777	1	0	0	0	0
–	(Slovakia) Viktória Chladoňová	Climberg Sport Team	1	0	0	0	0
–	(United States) Clara Honsinger	Team S&M CX	1	0	0	0	0

== 2022–23 UCI Cyclo-cross World Cup Standings ==
=== General classification ===
Men's Elite Standings
Rank	Rider	USA (United States)	USA (United States)	CZE (Czech Republic)	BEL (Belgium)	NED (Netherlands)	BEL (Belgium)	NED (Netherlands)	BEL (Belgium)	IRL (Republic of Ireland)	ITA (Italy)	BEL (Belgium)	BEL (Belgium)	ESP (Spain)	FRA (France)	Total Points
1	(Belgium) Laurens Sweeck	30	30	22	40	40	22	30	22	30	22	20	25	22	30	385
2	(Belgium) Michael Vanthourenhout	22	25	25	22	25	40	20	25	21	40	22	22			309
3	(Belgium) Eli Iserbyt	40	40	40	25	21	19	25	20	19				25	16	290
4	(Netherlands) Lars van der Haar	25		30	30	30	25	22	21	22		21	20	19		265
5	(Belgium) Niels Vandeputte	18	19	19	21	19	11	15	17	9	30	13	19	18	21	249
6	(Netherlands) Mathieu van der Poel							40	40		18	40	30	40	40	248
7	(Switzerland) Kevin Kuhn			18	20	11	16	16	13	15	25	5	17	20	19	195
8	(Belgium) Toon Vandebosch	9	17	6	17	15	14	17	3	12	13	18	9	15	13	178
9	(Belgium) Wout van Aert								30	40		30	40	30		170
10	(Belgium) Jens Adams			20	18	16	17	18	19	20		14	18			160

Women's Elite Standings
Rank	Rider	USA (United States)	USA (United States)	CZE (Czech Republic)	BEL (Belgium)	NED (Netherlands)	BEL (Belgium)	NED (Netherlands)	BEL (Belgium)	IRL (Republic of Ireland)	ITA (Italy)	BEL (Belgium)	BEL (Belgium)	ESP (Spain)	FRA (France)	Total Points
1	(Netherlands) Fem van Empel	40	40	40	40	30	30	30	40	40	–	–	25	40	–	395
2	(Netherlands) Puck Pieterse	–	–	30	30	25	40	40	30	30	40	25	30	30	40	390
3	(Netherlands) Shirin van Anrooij	–	–	19	25	40	25	25	25	–	–	40	40	25	–	264
4	(Netherlands) Inge van der Heijden	20	21	18	19	15	17	18	21	22	–	16	20	14	25	246
5	(Netherlands) Ceylin del Carmen Alvarado	30	20	20	17	22	21	22	–	–	30	–	21	–	–	203
6	(Netherlands) Denise Betsema	22	22	22	22	16	16	14	22	25	–	–	–	–	18	199
7	(Netherlands) Lucinda Brand	25	30	–	–	19	22	21	–	–	–	30	22	21	–	190
8	(Luxembourg) Marie Schreiber	–	–	16	14	18	11	15	17	21	20	9	10	11	20	182
9	(Netherlands) Manon Bakker	15	17	–	6	13	–	10	20	20	25	18	–	13	19	176
10	(Netherlands) Annemarie Worst	21	25	25	9	–	–	–	–	–	–	19	19	20	30	168

== Points accumulated ==
=== Men's Elite General classification ===
Europe

==== Austrian Cyclocross Cup 2022–23 ====
Men's Elite Standings
Rank	Rider	Lower Austria	Lower Austria	Lower Austria	Lower Austria	Vienna	Vienna	Lower Austria	Lower Austria	Salzburg (Salzburg (state))	Upper Austria	Lower Austria	Upper Austria	Upper Austria	Lower Austria	Total Points
1	(Austria) Daniel Federspiel	80	120	120	–	80	120	–	–	2	1	–	120	110	80	830
2	(Austria) Jakob Reiter	–	110	93	101	62	93	62	93	–	–	–	93	101	62	746
3	(Austria) Christian Isak	45	101	86	86	58	–	–	80	80'	51	58	80	2	31	740
4	(Austria) Philipp Heigl	67		110	120	–	–	73	120	–	–	–	–	–	73	563
5	(Austria) Adrian Stieger	–	–	–	–	73	101	1	–	2	54	67	101	86	–	298
6	(Austria) Manfred Zöger	73	–	101	75	–	110	–	–	–	–	–	–	–	58	417
7	(Germany) Michael Gaßner	–	–	–	–	–	–	–	–	120	80	–	–	–	–	200
8	(Austria) Lukas Mihalkovits	–	93	–	62	–	–	45	–	–	–	–	–	–	–	200
9	(Austria) Markus Gruber	13	46	40	–	21	–	–	42	–	–	19	–	–	14	195
10	(Austria) Peter Ochsenhofer	–	–	62	70	–	–	–	53	–	–	–	–	–	–	185

==== 2022–23 Superprestige ====
Men's Elite Standings
Rank	Rider	BEL (Belgium)	BEL (Belgium)	BEL (Belgium)	BEL (Belgium)	BEL (Belgium)	BEL (Belgium)	BEL (Belgium)	BEL (Belgium)	Total Points
1	(Netherlands) Lars van der Haar	13	14	14	14	13	10	12	14	104
2	(Belgium) Eli Iserbyt	15	12	12	13	5	12	14	15	98
3	(Belgium) Michael Vanthourenhout	11	13	13	12	11	11	13	7	91
4	(Belgium) Laurens Sweeck	14	15	15	11	8	5	–	13	81
5	(Switzerland) Kevin Kuhn	6	7	7	8	7	6	11	10	62
6	(Belgium) Niels Vandeputte	8	9	10	6	6	–	8	8	55
7	(United Kingdom) Tom Pidcock	–	–	9	15	12	14	–	–	50
8	(Belgium) Wout van Aert	–	–	–	–	15	15	15	–	45
9	(Belgium) Quinten Hermans	12	–	–	–	9	9	10	–	40
10	(Belgium) Toon Vandebosch	10	10	5	4	4	–	–	5	38

==== Czech Cyclocross Cup 2022 ====
Men's Elite Standings
Rank	Rider	CZE (Czech Republic)	CZE (Czech Republic)	CZE (Czech Republic)	CZE (Czech Republic)	CZE (Czech Republic)	CZE (Czech Republic)	CZE (Czech Republic)	CZE (Czech Republic)	CZE (Czech Republic)	CZE (Czech Republic)	Total Points
1	(Czech Republic) Šimon Vaníček	47	47	47	47	—	49	—	50	47	–	334
2	(Czech Republic) Jakub Říman	43	46	45	49	—	48	—	47	49	–	327
3	(Czech Republic) Adam Ťoupalík	48	49	49	50	—	46	—	48	—	–	290
4	(Czech Republic) Robert Hula	37	41	39	46	—	36	—	44	45	–	288
5	(Czech Republic) Patrik Černý	40	43	40	37	—	45	—	40	43	–	288
6	(Czech Republic) Tomáš Bakus	32	28	32	39	—	39	—	38	39	–	247
7	(Czech Republic) Pavel Jindřich	—	34	42	40	—	41	—	43	46	–	246
8	(Czech Republic) Maximilian Kerl	39	42	–	41	—	38	—	41	41	–	242
9	(Czech Republic) Matyáš Fiala	46	44	44	45	—	50	—	–	–	–	229
10	(Czech Republic) Vojtěch Vodrážka	18	26	29	33	—	33	—	36	37	–	212

==== Danish Cyclocross Cup 2022–2023 ====
Men's Elite Standings
Rank	Rider	DEN (Denmark)	DEN (Denmark)	DEN (Denmark)	DEN (Denmark)	DEN (Denmark)	DEN (Denmark)	Total Points
1	(Denmark) Karl-Erik Rosendahl	50	50	50	50	38	50	288
2	(Denmark) Morten Örnhagen	–	38	38	38	24	44	182
3	(Denmark) Bjørn Borreby Andreassen	–	–	34	44	22	–	100
4	(Denmark) Mikkel Jørgensen	38	30	30	–	–	–	98
5	(Denmark) Martin Ringsted Larsen	24	–	–	34	34	–	92
6	(Denmark) Thorbjørn Kristensen	–	26	19	28	18	–	91
7	(Denmark) Gustav Frederik Dahl	–	–	–	–	50	38	88
8	(Denmark) Gustav Wang	44	–	–	–	44	–	88
9	(Denmark) Jens Christian Dich	–	19	11	19	22	–	71
10	(Denmark) Oliver Friis Sørensen	19	17	16	–	–	–	52

==== Estonian Cyclocross Cup 2022 ====
Men's Elite Standings
Rank	Rider	EST (Estonia)	EST (Estonia)	EST (Estonia)	EST (Estonia)	EST (Estonia)	EST (Estonia)	Total Points
1	(Latvia) Matīss Kaļveršs	93	99	95	97	98	100	489
2	(Estonia) Kirill Tarassov	99	0	94	96	91	94	474
3	(Estonia) Magnus Krusemann	96	97	91	92	95	0	471
4	(Estonia) Rando Marten Evendi	95	88	87	90	88	92	453
5	(Estonia) Sten Kask	89	95	86	91	92	0	453
6	(Estonia) Mairon Milistver	90	82	89	88	90	95	452
7	(Latvia) Māris Bogdanovičs	0	100	97	99	0	99	395
8	(Estonia) Joonas Maanurm	86	83	85	0	0	91	345
9	(Estonia) Raul Rätsep	74	76	75	0	80	0	305
10	(Estonia) Caspar Austa	88	92	92	0	0	0	272

==== 2022 Coupe de France Cyclocross ====
Men's Elite Standings
Rank	Rider	FRA (France)	FRA (France)	FRA (France)	FRA (France)	FRA (France)	FRA (France)	Total Points
1	(Belgium) Gerben Kuypers	45	45	45	45	45	40	265
2	(Switzerland) Loris Rouiller	36	40	40	39	39	42	236
3	(France) Joshua Dubau	42	32	39	42	38	36	229
4	(France) Valentin Guillaud	40	36	34	40	36	32	218
5	(France) Steve Chainel	39	37	33	36	20	27	192
6	(France) Romain Seigle	37	38	36	38	16	15	180
7	(France) Tony Périou	19	30	37	37	37	18	178
8	(France) Arnold Jeannesson	38	35	29	26	18	29	175
9	(France) Mickaël Crispin	32	10	32	35	27	37	173
10	(France) Cyprien Gilles	20	25	35	32	34	10	156

==== Bikebeat German Bundesliga CycloCross 2022/23 ====
Men's Elite Standings
Rank	Rider	Hesse	Hesse	Lower Saxony	Lower Saxony	Lower Saxony	North Rhine-Westphalia	Baden-Württemberg	Baden-Württemberg	Rhineland-Palatinate	Baden-Württemberg	Baden-Württemberg	Saxony	Saxony	Lower Saxony	Total Points
1	(Germany) Marcel Meisen	100	95	60	90	0	0	60	60	0	60	0	0	0	0	525
2	(Germany) Fabian Eder	72	67	55	65	0	55	55	51*	0	51*	60	60	0	51*	587
3	(Germany) Sascha Starker	59	61	38	48	0	0	45	42	30	42	42	0	0	0	407
4	(Germany) Fynn Termin	42	37	32	61	51	42	0	0	30	0	0	0	55	40	390
5	(Germany) Luca Harter	0	0	51	69	60	0	51	45	0	48	40	0	0	0	372
6	(Germany) Silas Koech	40	25*	28	44	48	36	32	30	30	0	0	0	60	0	373
7	(Germany) Hannes Degenkolb	55	59	45	53	0	0	0	0	0	0	0	55	0	60	327
8	(Germany) Florian Hamm	48	69	0	0	0	0	48	48	30	36	48	0	0	0	117
9	(Germany) Lars Gräter	61	40	26	0	0	38	42	40	0	0	0	38	0	36	321
10	(Germany) Louis Krauss	43	48	30	55	0	0	27	19	30	32	27	0	0	0	311

==== British National Trophy Series 2022-2023 ====
Men's Elite Standings
Rank	Rider	Total Points
1	(United Kingdom) Toby Barnes	860
2	(United Kingdom) Jenson Young	805
3	(United Kingdom) Thomas Mein	750
4	(United Kingdom) Joseph Beckingsale	630
5	(United Kingdom) Simon Wyllie	609
6	(United Kingdom) Daniel Barnes	600
7	(United Kingdom) Joe Coukham	584
8	(United Kingdom) Tom Couzens	547
9	(United Kingdom) Joseph Blackmore	540
10	(United Kingdom) James Swadling	531

==== 2022 Irish National Cyclocross Series ====
Men's Elite Standings
Rank	Rider	IRL (Republic of Ireland)	IRL (Republic of Ireland)	IRL (Republic of Ireland)	IRL (Republic of Ireland)	Total Points
1	(Republic of Ireland) Dean Harvey	60	60	60	60	240
2	(Republic of Ireland) Kevin McCambridge	55	43	51	51	200
3	(Republic of Ireland) Jamie Meehan	45	–	48	48	141
4	(Republic of Ireland) Darragh McCarter	48	45	–	44	137
5	(Republic of Ireland) Lee Harvey	38	–	45	45	128
6	(Republic of Ireland) Darnell Moore	–	55	55	–	110
7	(Republic of Ireland) JB Murphy	51	48	–	–	99
8	(Republic of Ireland) Darren Rafferty	40	–	–	55	95
10	(Republic of Ireland) Richard Maes	46	44	–	–	90

==== Islandic CX Cup 2022 ====
Men's Elite Standings
Rank	Rider	Total Points
1	(Iceland) Ingvar Ómarsson	100
2	(Netherlands) Dennis van Eijk	90
3	(Iceland) Emil Þór Guðmundsson	66
4	(Iceland) Bjarki Sigurjónsson	54
5	(Iceland) Sveinn Ottó Sigurðsson	52
6	(Iceland) Eyþór Eiríksson	52
7	(Iceland) Jón Geir Friðbjörnsson	38
8	(Iceland) Ármann Gylfason	36
9	(Iceland) Maxon Quas	36
10	(Iceland) Hafsteinn Geirsson	32

==== 2022 Giro d'Italia Cross ====
Men's Elite Standings
Rank	Rider	Total Points
1	(Italy) Marco Pavan	151
2	(Italy) Antonio Folcarelli	87
3	(Italy) Tommaso Ferri	86
4	(Italy) Stefano Capponi	74
5	(Italy) Ettore Loconsolo	68
6	(Italy) Gioele Bertolini	60
7	(Italy) Eros Cancedda	47
8	(Italy) Philippe Mancinelli	45
9	(Italy) Fabrizio Perin	40
10	(Italy) Luca Paletti	39

==== ŠKODA Coupe de Louxembourg Cyclo-cross 2022–23 ====
Men's Elite Standings
Rank	Rider	LUX (Luxembourg)	LUX (Luxembourg)	LUX (Luxembourg)	LUX (Luxembourg)	LUX (Luxembourg)	LUX (Luxembourg)	LUX (Luxembourg)	LUX (Luxembourg)	LUX (Luxembourg)	LUX (Luxembourg)	LUX (Luxembourg)	LUX (Luxembourg)	LUX (Luxembourg)	LUX (Luxembourg)	LUX (Luxembourg)	LUX (Luxembourg)	Total Points
1	(Luxembourg) Ken Conter	22	25	18	25	—		—	16	22	—	16	20	9	22	40	22	257
2	(Luxembourg) Raphaël Kockelmann	20	16	22	20	—	16	—		20	—	18	16	8	20	45	20	241
3	(Luxembourg) Mats Wenzel					—	25	—	25		—	22				60		132
4	(Luxembourg) Mathieu Kockelmann					—		—	22		—	20	25		16	30	16	129
5	(Luxembourg) Mil Morang					—	18	—			—	13	18		15	50	15	129
6	(Luxembourg) Mik Esser		15	12	16	—	8	—	12	16	—	10	12		5	16	5	127
7	(Luxembourg) Jo Schmitz	18	13	10		—	12	—	14		—		7		12	22	12	120
8	(Luxembourg) Lenny Kleman	16	9	6	18	—		—	8	7	—	1	9		10	13	10	107
9	(Luxembourg) Noah Fries	15	14	9	6	—	2	—	13	9	—	4	1		3	20	3	99
10	(Luxembourg) Patrick Mersch	10	4	1	8	—	4	—	7	14	—	3	10		9	15	9	94

==== Norges CX Cup 2022 ====
Men's Elite Standings
Rank	Rider	Total Points
1	(Norway) Kevin Andre Sandli Messel	4140
2	(Norway) Mats Tubaas Glende	3480
3	(Norway) Martin Røste Omdahl	3270
4	(Norway) Marius Grøndahl Andresen	3054
5	(Norway) Jon Mykland Lunåshaug	3012
6	(Norway) Fredrik Breyer	2772
7	(Norway) Ole Sigurd Rekdahl	2700
8	(Norway) Thomas Rem	2286
9	(Norway) Martin E. Farstadvoll	1800
10	(Norway) Erik Resell	1200

==== Puchar Polski CX 2022 ====
Men's Elite Standings
Rank	Rider	Total Points
1	(Poland) Dawid Jona	355
2	(Poland) Szymon Pomian	259
3	(Poland) Bartosz Mikler	240
4	(Poland) Mariusz Gil	220
5	(Poland) Marek Konwa	200
6	(Poland) Michał Paterak	197
7	(Poland) Michał Topór	176
8	(Poland) Jakub Musialik	161
9	(Poland) Patryk Kostecki	153
10	(Czech Republic) Ondřej Zelený	135

==== Taça de Portugal de Ciclocrosse 2022 ====
Men's Elite Standings
Rank	Rider	Portugal	Portugal	Portugal	Portugal	Portugal	Total Points
1	(Portugal) Mário Costa	60	40	60	40	60	260
2	(Portugal) Roberto Ferreira	0	30	40	60	40	170
3	(Portugal) Márcio Barbosa	40	60	25	25	18	168
4	(Portugal) Bruno Silva	30	25	30	20	25	130
5	(Portugal) Vitor Santos	20	18	20	30	30	118
6	(Portugal) João Cruz	16	20	10	16	20	82
7	(Portugal) Fábio Ribeiro	18	16	14	14	8	70
8	(Portugal) Alexandre Montez	0	0	6	18	14	38
9	(Portugal) João Silva	14	8	16	0	0	38
10	(Portugal) Pedro Miguel Lopes	6	0	8	8	16	38

==== Cupa Națională de Ciclocros a României 2022 ====
Men's Elite Standings
Rank	Rider	ROU (Romania)	ROU (Romania)	ROU (Romania)	Total Points
1	(Romania) József Attila Málnási	80	80	80	240
2	(Romania) Cristian Stan	70	70	70	210
3	(Romania) Sabin Husariu	65	65	65	195
4	(Romania) Timotei Păcurar	60	60	60	180
5	(Romania) Alex Bartus	50	60	60	170
6	(Romania) Cătălin Buta	60	50	50	160
7	(Romania) Mihnea Harasim		45	45	90
8	(Romania) Iustin Vaidian	45		40	85
9	(Romania) Emil Ercsei	40		30	70
10	(Romania) Mihai Băbăiță	55			55

==== Slovak Cyclocross Cup 2022 ====
Men's Elite Standings
Rank	Rider	SVK (Slovakia)	SVK (Slovakia)	SVK (Slovakia)	SVK (Slovakia)	SVK (Slovakia)	SVK (Slovakia)	SVK (Slovakia)	SVK (Slovakia)	SVK (Slovakia)	Total Points
1	(Belgium) Victor van de Putte	–	–	–	100	80	80	100	100		460
2	(Poland) Marek Konwa	–	65	70	–	–	100	80	80		395
3	(Slovakia) Martin Haring	–	50	50	40	70	45	24	27	100	382
4	(Belgium) Ward Huybs	–	100	80	80	100	–	–	–	–	360
5	(Slovakia) Samuel Kováč	55	21	30	55	55	0	15	24	80	320
6	(Czech Republic) Jakub Říman	80	60	55	–	–	–	70	35	–	300
7	(Belgium) Seppe Rombouts	–	70	60	–	–	60	55	45	–	290
8	(Slovakia) Šimon Vozár	27	35	0	65	30	27	10	18	70	272
9	(Czech Republic) Ondřej Zelený	50	14	35	60	50	30	–	–	–	239
10	(Netherlands) Pete Uptegrove	–	–	–	–	–	65	65	70	–	200

==== Copa de España de Ciclocross 2022-2023 ====
Men's Elite Standings
Rank	Rider	ESP (Spain)	ESP (Spain)	ESP (Spain)	ESP (Spain)	ESP (Spain)	ESP (Spain)	ESP (Spain)	ESP (Spain)	ESP (Spain)	Total Points
1	(Spain) Kevin Suárez	25	14	–	25	25	25	25	–	–	139
2	(Spain) Gonzalo Inguanzo	14	4	2	–	–	20	20	14	25	117
3	(Spain) Mario Junquera	20	–	25	–	–	14	16	6	–	81
4	(Spain) Julio Pérez Serdio	12	3	10	9	10	12	10	3	–	69
5	(Spain) Diego Ruiz de Arcaute	5	–	14	3	8	8	12	–	9	59
6	(Spain) Miguel Rodríguez Novoa	–	2	12	–	–	16	14	7	8	59
7	(Spain) Felipe Orts	–	20	–	–	–	–	–	25	12	57
8	(Spain) Jofre Cullell	–	–	9	14	12	–	–	9	6	50
9	(Spain) Alain Suárez	2	–	–	10	1	7	–	12	16	48
10	(Spain) Tomás Misser	16	–	6	–	3	9	8	5	1	48

==== 2022 Swedish National Cyclocross Cup ====
Men's Elite Standings
Rank	Rider	SWE (Sweden)	SWE (Sweden)	SWE (Sweden)	SWE (Sweden)	Total Points
1	(Sweden) David Eriksson	88	80	88	88	344
2	(Sweden) Filip Mård	59	57	100	100	316
3	(Sweden) Alvin Dahl	53	53	74	74	254
4	(Sweden) Rasmus Alm	50	51	65	59	225
5	(Sweden) Sebastian Petterson	51	52	54	55	212
6	(Belgium) Arne Baers	100	100	–	–	200
7	(Sweden) Oh Dahlblom	55	–	80	62	197
8	(Sweden) Filip Stark	54	55	–	69	178
9	(Netherlands) Koen Van Dijke	74	88	–	–	162
10	(Denmark) Karl-Erik Rosendahl	63	74	–	–	136

==== Swiss Ciclocross Cup 2022-2023 ====
Men's Elite Standings
Rank	Rider	SUI (Switzerland)	SUI (Switzerland)	SUI (Switzerland)	SUI (Switzerland)	SUI (Switzerland)	Total Points
1	(Switzerland) Loris Rouiller	65	–	100	70	60	295
2	(Belgium) Yorben Lauryssen	–	100	80	65	18	263
3	(Belgium) Ferre Geeraerts	44	52	42	48	28	214
4	(Italy) Gioele Bertolini	–	–	65	80	65	210
5	(Switzerland) Kevin Kuhn	100	–	–	–	100	200
6	(Switzerland) Hannes Jeker	–	48	50	34	32	164
7	(France) Martin Groslambert	–	–	48	54	58	160
8	(Switzerland) Timon Rüegg	70	–	–	–	80	150
9	(Czech Republic) Jakub Říman		–	–	100	48	148
10	(Switzerland) Nicolas Bard	–	40	38	44	24	146

==== USCX Cyclocross Series 2022 ====
Men's Elite Standings
Rank	Rider	USA (United States)	USA (United States)	USA (United States)	USA (United States)	USA (United States)	USA (United States)	USA (United States)	USA (United States)	Total Points
1	(United States) Curtis White	32	28	42	32	38	40	42	32	286
2	(United States) Eric Brunner	42	32	30	28	42	19	50	40	283
3	(Belgium) Vincent Baestaens	50	40	50	40	50	32	–	–	262
4	(Canada) Michael van den Ham	34	22	32	20	26	24	28	9	195
5	(Canada) Tyler Clark	24	16	21	18	22	15	30	21	167
6	(United States) Caleb Swartz	30	21	38	15	–	–	34	22	160
7	(United States) Scott Funston	3	18	28	16	28	2	32	28	155
8	(United States) Jonathan Anderson	21	9	23	14	25	11	12	14	129
9	(Canada) Cody Scott	20	13	20	11	21	14	20	5	124
10	(United States) Kerry Werner	38	24	–	–	34	28	–	–	124

=== Women's Elite General classification ===
Europe

==== Austrian Cyclocross Cup 2022–23 ====
Women's Elite Standings
Rank	Rider	Lower Austria	Lower Austria	Lower Austria	Lower Austria	Vienna	Vienna	Lower Austria	Lower Austria	Salzburg (Salzburg (state))	Upper Austria	Lower Austria	Upper Austria	Upper Austria	Lower Austria	Total Points
1	(Austria) Silke Mair	73	80	62	–	80	80	73	73	80	80	73	–	80	73	907
2	(Austria) Anna Hofmann	67	73	67	–	73	73	–	62	73	58	67	–	1	62	676
3	(Austria) Romana Slavinec	–	–	–	67	67	–	67	58	67	62	62	–	67	51	568
4	(Austria) Nadja Heigl	80	–	80	80	–	–	80	80	–	–	–	–	–	80	480
5	(Austria) Milica Widhalm	–	58	48	–	–	–	–	48	51	48	51	62	62	–	428
6	(Austria) Lisa Csenar	–	–	51	–	–	54	54	43	54	43	45	–	–	37	381
7	(Austria) Cornelia Holland	–	–	–	–	–	–	–	–	–	73	'80	–	73	–	226
8	(Austria) Anna Briefer	–	–	–	–	–	58	62	51	–	–	48	–	–	–	219
9	(Austria) Fiona Klien	–	–	73	73	–	–	–	67	–	–	–	–	–	–	213
10	(Austria) Cecilia Kraut	62	–	54	–	–	1	51	–	–	–	–	–	–	–	168

==== 2022–23 Superprestige ====
Women's Elite Standings
Rank	Rider	BEL (Belgium)	BEL (Belgium)	BEL (Belgium)	BEL (Belgium)	BEL (Belgium)	BEL (Belgium)	BEL (Belgium)	BEL (Belgium)	Total Points
1	(Netherlands) Ceylin del Carmen Alvarado	13	15	15	9	15	13	15	15	110
2	(Netherlands) Inge van der Heijden	14	13	13	11	14	12	14	12	103
3	(Netherlands) Denise Betsema	15	14	14	14	11	8	13	10	99
4	(Netherlands) Aniek van Alphen	10	12	9	15	10	6	–	–	62
5	(Belgium) Marion Norbert-Riberolle	11	9	8	3	8	–	10	9	58
6	(United Kingdom) Zoe Bäckstedt	6	5	11	–	–	9	12	–	43
7	(Netherlands) Annemarie Worst	12	–	–	–	9	7	–	13	41
8	(Netherlands) Lucinda Brand	–	–	12	–	13	–	–	14	39
9	(Belgium) Sanne Cant	9	11	4	–	–	–	11	–	35
10	(Netherlands) Manon Bakker	–	10	10	6	–	–	–	5	31

==== Czech Cyclocross Cup 2022 ====
Women's Elite Standings
Rank	Rider	CZE (Czech Republic)	CZE (Czech Republic)	CZE (Czech Republic)	CZE (Czech Republic)	CZE (Czech Republic)	CZE (Czech Republic)	CZE (Czech Republic)	CZE (Czech Republic)	CZE (Czech Republic)	CZE (Czech Republic)	Total Points
1	(Czech Republic) Kateřina Douděrová	38	39	38	40	—	44	—	42	41	–	282
2	(Czech Republic) Barbora Jeřábková	37	38	36	42	—	48	—	–	48		248
3	(Czech Republic) Kristýna Zemanová	49	49	49	50	—	50	—	—	—	–	247
4	(Czech Republic) Pavla Havlíková	—	46	48	49	—	—	—	46	50	–	239
5	(Czech Republic) Kateřina Hladíková	—	42	47	48	—	47	—	—	48	–	232
6	(Czech Republic) Tereza Vaníčková	42	—	42	46	—	45	—	49	—	–	224
7	(Czech Republic) Vanda Dlasková	—	—	40	41	—	46	—	50	43	–	220
8	(Czech Republic) Eliška Drbohlavová	26	34	35	39	—	—	—	44	35	–	213
9	(Czech Republic) Simona Rusínová	28	26	26	31	—	34	—	30	32	–	207
10	(Czech Republic) Tereza Cibulková	22	27	30	33	—	36	—	26	28	–	202

==== Danish Cyclocross Cup 2022–2023 ====
Women's Elite Standings
Rank	Rider	DEN (Denmark)	DEN (Denmark)	DEN (Denmark)	DEN (Denmark)	DEN (Denmark)	DEN (Denmark)	Total Points
1	(Denmark) Mie Pedersen	50	50	50	–	–	38	188
2	(Denmark) Cæcilie Christoffersen	34	44	44	–	30	26	178
3	(Denmark) Ann-Dorthe Lisbygd	–	–	–	50	50	50	150
4	(Denmark) Maj Hinrichsen	38	–	–	38	34	28	138
5	(Netherlands) Lieske Coumans	–	38	34	34	–		106
6	(Denmark) Anna-Sofie Nørgaard	–	–	–	44	–	44	88
7	(Denmark) Nikoline Splittorff	44	–	–	–	38		82
8	(Sweden) Anna Eriksmo	–	–	–	–	44	34	78
9	(Denmark) Mia Westergaard	–	–	38	–	–	–	38
10	(Denmark) Maja Winther Brandt Heisel	–	–	–	–	28	–	28

==== Estonian Cyclocross Cup 2022 ====
Women's Elite Standings
Rank	Rider	EST (Estonia)	EST (Estonia)	EST (Estonia)	EST (Estonia)	EST (Estonia)	EST (Estonia)	Total Points
1	(Estonia) Merili Sirvel	83	83	80	90	87	0	423
2	(Estonia) Annabrit Prants	73	0	78	79	86	90	406
3	(Estonia) Maris Kaarjärv	76	77	76	75	84	0	388
4	(Estonia) Agnes Kukk	64	68	67	0	73	81	353
5	(Estonia) Tatjana Dobolina	79	0	75	71	83	0	308
6	(Estonia) Sille Puhu	0	72	73	69	85	0	299
7	(Estonia) Mari-Liis Mõttus	0	0	95	94	0	0	189
8	(Estonia) Elisabeth Ebras	0	0	0	85	93	0	178
9	(Estonia) Elina Tasane	0	0	86	83	0	0	169
10	(Estonia) Laura Lepasalu	80	82	0	0	0	0	162

==== 2022 Coupe de France Cyclo-cross ====
Women's Elite Standings
Rank	Rider	FRA (France)	FRA (France)	FRA (France)	FRA (France)	FRA (France)	FRA (France)	Total Points
1	(France) Anaïs Morichon	38	38	45	45	39	45	250
2	(France) Perrine Clauzel	39	39	42	42	42	42	246
3	(France) Lauriane Duraffourg	36	37	40	37	45	38	233
4	(France) Solenne Billouin	40	36	39	39	37	36	227
5	(France) Amandine Vidon	34	35	38	40	38	40	225
6	(France) Laura Porhel	33	30	37	38	34	37	209
7	(France) Audrey Weingarten	26	32	36	33	36	34	197
8	(France) Marlène Petit	32	29	35	35	35	28	194
9	(France) Cyriane Muller	31	34	28	36	26	33	188
10	(France) Alizée Rigaux	25	20	30	34	32	30	171

==== Bikebeat German Bundesliga CycloCross 2022/23 ====
Women's Elite Standings
Rank	Rider	Hesse	Hesse	Lower Saxony	Lower Saxony	Lower Saxony	North Rhine-Westphalia	Baden-Württemberg	Baden-Württemberg	Rhineland-Palatinate	Baden-Württemberg	Baden-Württemberg	Saxony	Saxony	Lower Saxony	Total Points
1	(Germany) Stefanie Paul	49*	65	60	78	60	55	60	60	30	0	0	60	55	51	683
2	(Germany) Lisa Heckmann	63	55	45*	67	0	51	51	55	30	60	60	0	0	0	537
3	(Germany) Diana Steffenhagen	40	0	40	59	0	0	45	42	0	51	51	0	0	40	368
4	(Germany) Dana Wagner	28*	32	32	57	0	42	40	48	0	48	48	0	0	0	375
5	(Germany) Lea Lützen	0	0	48	75	51	48	0	0	30	0	0	0	0	55	307
6	(Germany) Miriam Zeise	0	0	34	49	48	0	0	0	0	0	42	45	48	36	302
7	(Germany) Cordula Neudörffer	0	0	51	65	55	0	48	51	30	0	0	0	0	0	300
8	(Netherlands) Aniek van Alphen	95	95	0	100	0	0	0	0	0	0	0	0	0	0	290
9	(Germany) Larissa Luttuschka	0	0	0	0	0	45	42	38	0	0	0	55	60	45	285
10	(Germany) Kati Rothe	24	27	21*	41	0	27	27	28	27	38	30	0	0	0	290

==== British National Trophy Series 2022-2023 ====
Women's Elite Standings
Rank	Rider	GBR (United Kingdom)	GBR (United Kingdom)	GBR (United Kingdom)	GBR (United Kingdom)	GBR (United Kingdom)	GBR (United Kingdom)	Total Points
1	(United Kingdom) Alderney Baker	150	180	180	130	109	115	755
2	(United Kingdom) Millie Couzens	–	200	–	180	170	200	750
3	(United Kingdom) Christina Wiejak	109	140	170	170	100	135	724
4	(United Kingdom) Lotta Mansfield	125	160	140	103	135	160	720
5	(United Kingdom) Elena Day	130	135	160	140	103	140	705
6	(United Kingdom) Sophie Thackray	106	150	103	112	130	150	648
7	(United Kingdom) Ishbel Strathdee	120	170	109	125	120	–	644
8	(United Kingdom) Ruby James	115	–	150	135	115	125	640
9	(United Kingdom) Rebecca Preece	112	–	135	109	150	130	636
10	(United Kingdom) Amy Perryman	100	120	125	106	140	120	611

==== 2022 Irish Cyclocross National Series ====
Women's Elite Standings
Rank	Rider	IRL (Republic of Ireland)	IRL (Republic of Ireland)	IRL (Republic of Ireland)	IRL (Republic of Ireland)	Total Points
1	(Republic of Ireland) Stephanie Roche	48	51	55	55	209
2	(Republic of Ireland) Grace Young	55	55	46	51	207
3	(Republic of Ireland) Caoimhe May	51	48	51	48	198
4	(Republic of Ireland) Aine Doherty	60	60	–	60	180
5	(Republic of Ireland) Doireann Killeen	45	46	41	46	178
6	(Republic of Ireland) Helen White	41	44	42	43	170
7	(Republic of Ireland) Niamh Stephens	44	43	43	–	130
8	(Republic of Ireland) Leah McCarthy	42	42	44	–	128
9	(Republic of Ireland) Sienna O'Dwyer	43	45	–	–	88
10	(Republic of Ireland) Lucy Brown	–	–	39	44	83

==== Islandic CX Cup 2022 ====
Men's Elite Standings
Rank	Rider	Total Points
1	(Iceland) Björg Hákonardóttir	100
2	(Iceland) Elín Björg Björnsdóttir	90
3	(Iceland) Bergdís Eva Sveinsdóttir	58
4	(Iceland) Júlía Oddsdóttir	32
5	(Iceland) Hafdís Sigurðardóttir	32

==== 2022 Giro d'Italia Cross ====
Women's Elite Standings
Rank	Rider	Total Points
1	(Italy) Rebecca Gariboldi	142
2	(Italy) Romina Costantini	109
3	(Italy) Alessia Bulleri	100
4	(Italy) Alice Papo	61
5	(Italy) Alice Sabatino	60
6	(Italy) Sara Casasola	60
7	(Italy) Giorgia Giannotti	54
8	(Albania) Nelia Kabetaj	39
9	(Italy) Sofia Arici	34
10	(Italy) Sara Tarallo	29

==== ŠKODA Coupe de Louxembourg Cyclo-cross 2022–23 ====
Women's Elite Standings
Rank	Rider (* Women's U23) / (** Women's Juniors)	LUX (Luxembourg)	LUX (Luxembourg)	LUX (Luxembourg)	LUX (Luxembourg)	LUX (Luxembourg)	LUX (Luxembourg)	LUX (Luxembourg)	LUX (Luxembourg)	LUX (Luxembourg)	LUX (Luxembourg)	LUX (Luxembourg)	LUX (Luxembourg)	LUX (Luxembourg)	LUX (Luxembourg)	LUX (Luxembourg)	LUX (Luxembourg)	Total Points
1	(Luxembourg) Isabelle Klein			25	25	—		—	25	25	—	25	25	35		45		230
2	(Luxembourg) Anouk Schmitz **	20	25	20	16	—		—	18		—	16				30		145
3	(Luxembourg) Gwen Nothum **					—		—	16	20	—		18	15	22	28	22	141
4	(Luxembourg) Layla Barthels *	25			20	—	25	—			—	18	22			26		136
5	(Luxembourg) Liv Wenzel *			22		—		—	20		—	22		20		50		134
6	(Luxembourg) Maïté Barthels *	22				—	22	—			—	20	20			40		124
7	(Luxembourg) Lis Nothum *	16		16		—		—	15	18	—				18	22	18	123
8	(Luxembourg) Nina Berton *				18	—		—	22	22	—			26		35		123
9	(Luxembourg) Mélanie Wünsch					—		—			—	15	15		20		20	69
10	(Luxembourg) Marie Schreiber					—		—			—					60		60

==== Norges CX Cup 2022 ====
Women's Elite Standings
Rank	Rider	Total Points
1	(Norway) Thea Siggerud	4620
2	(Norway) Åshild Tovsrud	3120
3	(Norway) Linn Sofie Mohn	3060
4	(Norway) Oda Laforce	2820
5	(Norway) Elisabeth Sveum	2280
6	(Norway) Sigrid Andrea Fløgstad	1320
7	(Norway) Tora Bjørndal Ottestad	1080
8	(Norway) Susanne Andersen	1080
9	(Norway) Siri Hildonen	960
10	(Norway) Live Kåsa Svarstad	600

==== Puchar Polski CX 2022 ====
Women's Elite Standings
Rank	Rider	Total Points
1	(Poland) Zuzanna Krzystała	460
2	(Poland) Maja Józkowicz	246
3	(Poland) Tatiana Gromada	238
4	(Poland) Aleksandra Stawiraj	191
5	(Poland) Dominika Włodarczyk	180
6	(Poland) Malwina Mul	180
7	(Poland) Rozalia Dutczak	152
8	(Poland) Klaudia Czabok	144
9	(Austria) Nadja Heigl	140
10	(Poland) Aleksandra Andrzejewska	130

==== Taça de Portugal de Ciclocrosse 2022 ====
Women's Elite Standings
Rank	Rider	Portugal	Portugal	Portugal	Portugal	Portugal	Total Points
1	(Portugal) Joana Monteiro	60	60	60	60	60	300
2	(Portugal) Marta Branco	40	40	20	40	25	165
3	(Portugal) Catarina Lopes	20	30	25	30	40	145
4	(Portugal) Jessica Costa	18	25	30	25	30	128
5	(Portugal) Isabel Caetano	30	20	40	–	–	90
6	(Portugal) Inês Trancoso	–	–	–	25	20	45
7	(Portugal) Andréia Freitas	–	–	–	18	18	36
8	(Portugal) Daniela Pereira	25	–	DNF	–	–	25
9	(Portugal) Laura Simão	–	–	18	–	DNS	18
10	(Portugal) Ana Rita Vigário	–	–	16	–	–	16

==== Cupa Națională de Ciclocros a României 2022 ====
Women's Elite Standings
Rank	Rider	ROU (Romania)	ROU (Romania)	ROU (Romania)	Total Points
1	(Romania) Suzanne Hilbert	80	80	80	240
2	(Romania) Eszter Bereczki	70	–	–	70
3	(Romania) Salomé Bondor	65	–	–	42

==== Slovenský pohár v cyklokrose 2022 ====
Women's Elite Standings
Rank	Rider	SVK (Slovakia)	SVK (Slovakia)	SVK (Slovakia)	SVK (Slovakia)	SVK (Slovakia)	SVK (Slovakia)	SVK (Slovakia)	SVK (Slovakia)	SVK (Slovakia)	Total Points
1	(Czech Republic) Pavla Havlíková		80	80	100	100	100	0	70		530
2	(Czech Republic) Kristýna Zemanová		100	100				100	100		400
3	(Slovakia) Viktória Chladoňová	100					60	50	65	100	375
4	(Italy) Alessia Bulleri		65	65			80	80	80		370
5	(Poland) Zuzanna Krzystała		40	40	70	80	55	24	45		330
6	(Belgium) Audrey De Keersmaeker	70	0		60	55	24	55	60		324
7	(Slovakia) Tereza Kurnická	80	45	45	65		18	15	12	45	313
8	(Slovakia) Janka Keseg Števková	60	24	21	24	50	21	12	24	80	283
9	(Slovakia) Sofia Ungerová	50	14	12	40	65	50	27	50	0	282
10	(Slovakia) Dorota Vojtíšková	45	10	15	50	35	30	10	27	70	272

==== Copa de España de Ciclocross 2022 ====
Women's Elite Standings
Rank	Rider	ESP (Spain)	ESP (Spain)	ESP (Spain)	ESP (Spain)	ESP (Spain)	ESP (Spain)	ESP (Spain)	ESP (Spain)	ESP (Spain)	Total Points
1	(Spain) Lucía González Blanco	25	25	–	25	20	25	20	25	25	190
2	(Spain) Sofia Rodríguez	20	20	–	12	16	20	25	20	20	153
3	(Spain) Sara Cueto	16	12	25	16	14	16	16	–	–	115
4	(Spain) Irene Trabazo	14	5	20	–	9	14	14	12	12	100
5	(Spain) Sara Bonillo Talens	10	2	16	3	–	5	7	9	9	61
6	(Spain) Alicia González Blanco	–	10	–	–	–	12	12	16	–	50
7	(France) Amélie Laquèbe	9	–	12	9	8	8	–	–	–	46
8	(Netherlands) Manon Bakker	–	–	–	20	25	–	–	–	–	45
9	(Spain) Paula Diaz	8	4	–	1	5	10	10	–	–	38
10	(Spain) Alba Teruel Ribes	–	–	–	–	–	–	–	14	16	30

==== 2022 Swedish National Cyclocross Cup ====
Women's Elite Standings
Rank	Rider	SWE (Sweden)	SWE (Sweden)	SWE (Sweden)	SWE (Sweden)	Total Points
1	(Sweden) Ida Ullstrand	65	57	65	74	261
2	(Sweden) Agnes Abrahamsson	–	–	88	100	188
3	(Netherlands) Femke Gort	88	100	–	–	188
4	(Belgium) Suzanne Verhoeven	100	88	–	–	188
5	(Sweden) Alma Johansson	–	–	100	80	180
6	(Sweden) Clara Lundmark	74	80	–	–	154
7	(Belgium) Febe De Smedt	80	74	–	–	154
8	(Sweden) Amanda Nordin	–	–	74	69	143
9	(Norway) Åshild Tovsrud	69	69	–	–	138
10	(Sweden) Felicia Henttonen	–	–	69	65	134

==== Swiss Ciclocross Cup 2022-2023 ====
Women's Elite Standings
Rank	Rider	SUI (Switzerland)	SUI (Switzerland)	SUI (Switzerland)	SUI (Switzerland)	SUI (Switzerland)	Total Points
1	(Switzerland) Elodie Python	50	65	54	46	28	243
2	(Italy) Rebecca Gariboldi	–	100	–	70	60	230
3	(Switzerland) Muriel Furrer	56	–	65	54	36	211
4	(Switzerland) Jacqueline Schneebeli	58	80	70	–	–	208
5	(Switzerland) Michelle Schätti	44	54	46	32	26	202
6	(Italy) Sara Casasola	–	–	100	100	–	200
7	(France) Hélène Clauzel	100	–	–	–	80	180
8	(Switzerland) Evelyne Trepte	–	60	52	44	24	180
9	(Switzerland) Zina Barhoumi	65	–	–	65	46	176
10	(France) Electa Gallezot	–	–	58	52	44	154

==== USCX Cyclocross Series 2022 ====
Women's Elite Standings
Rank	Rider	USA (United States)	USA (United States)	USA (United States)	USA (United States)	USA (United States)	USA (United States)	USA (United States)	USA (United States)	Total Points
1	(France) Caroline Mani	50	40	42	28	42	32	50	40	324
3	(United States) Raylyn Nuss	42	32	34	22	38	22	42	32	264
3	(United States) Austin Killips	38	28	38	18	34	28	34	28	246
4	(United States) Caitlin Bernstein	34	21	25	16	26	17	22	24	185
5	(United States) Emily Werner	30	18	23	21	23	21	25	22	183
6	(United States) Anna Megale	28	20	28	19	25	18	23	21	182
7	(Netherlands) Annemarie Worst			50	40	50	40			180
8	(United States) Hannah Arensman	24	22	24	15	30	20			135
9	(Canada) Sidney McGill			26	24	32	24	28		134
10	(United States) Lauren Zoerner	25	19	30	17			32		123

== National Championships (NC) ==
Country	Date	Elite	U23	Juniors
Austria	15 January 2023	Daniel Federspiel; Nadja Heigl	N/A	Dominik Hödlmoser; Nora Fischer
Australia	17 September 2022	Tom Chapman; Rebecca Locke	Declan Trezise; Talia Simpson	Levi Dougherty; Ruby Dobson
Belgium	14–15 January 2023	Michael Vanthourenhout; Sanne Cant	Witse Meeussen	Viktor Vandenberghe; Fleur Moors
Canada	26 November 2022	Tyler Clark; Ava Holmgren	Luke Valenti; Emilly Johnston	Ian Ackert; Isabella Holmgren
Chile	13–14 August 2022	Patricio Campbell; Evelyn Muñoz	N/A	Raimundo Carvajal Oliva
Croatia	15 January 2023	Viktor Potočki; Larisa Bošnjak	N/A	Filip Pečnjak
Czech Republic	15 January 2023	Michael Boroš; Kristýna Zemanová	N/A	Jakub Kuba; Eliska Hanáková
Denmark	15 January 2023	Sebastian Fini Carstensen; Caroline Bohé	N/A	Albert Philipsen; Julie Lillelund
Estonia	22 October 2022	Frank Aron Ragilo; Mari-Liis Mõttus	N/A	Markus Mäeuibo; Karolin Surva
Finland	9 October 2022	Aku Koivistoinen; Anniina Ahtosalo	N/A	Kasper Borremans; Viivi Turpeinen
France	15 January 2023	Clément Venturini; Hélène Clauzel	Martin Groslambert	Léo Bisiaux; Lise Klaes
Germany	14–15 January 2023	Sascha Weber; Judith Krahl	Hannes Degenkolb; Sina van Thiel	Louis Leidert; Messane Bräutigam
United Kingdom	15 January 2023	Cameron Mason; Zoe Bäckstedt	N/A	Sebastian Grindley; Imogen Wolff
Greece	29 January 2023	Dimitrios Antoniadis; Eleftheria Giachou	N/A	Efstratios Manolidis; Maria Fostini
Hungary	15 January 2023	Márton Dina; Blanka Vas	N/A	Zsombor Takács; Regina Bruchner
Ireland	15 January 2023	Dean Harvey; Maria Larkin	N/A	Liam O'Brien; Hannah McClorey
Iceland	8 October 2022	Ingvar Ómarsson; Björg Hákonardóttir	N/A	N/A
Italy	15 January 2023	Filippo Fontana; Silvia Persico	Filippo Agostinacchio	Samuele Scappini; Valentina Corvi
Japan	15 January 2023	Hijiri Oda; Sae Ogawa	Shingen Yunoki	Sho Takahashi; Aika Hiyoshi
Lithuania	23 October 2022	Venantas Lašinis; Inga Paplauskė	N/A	Tadas Baranauskas
Luxembourg	15 January 2023	Raphaël Kockelmann; Marie Schreiber	Mats Wenzel; Liv Wenzel	Noa Berton; Anouk Schmitz
New Zealand	14 August 2022	Jacob Turner; Amy Hollamby	N/A	Coen Nicol; Maria Laurie
Netherlands	15 January 2023	Lars van der Haar; Puck Pieterse	Tibor del Grosso; Leonie Bentveld	Keije Solen; Lauren Molengraaf
Norway	20 November 2022	Mats Tubaas Glende; Elisabeth Sveum	N/A	Aksel Laforce; Malin Karlsen
Poland	15 January 2023	Marek Konwa; Dominika Wlodarczyk	N/A	Brajan Swider; Tatiana Gromada
Portugal	15 January 2023	Roberto Ferreira; Ana Santos	Alexandre Montez; Beatriz Guerra	Tomás Gaspar
Romania	10 December 2022	József Attila Málnási; Suzanne Hilbert	Eduard Kubat	Victor Alexandru Aron; Wendy Bunea
Serbia	22 January 2023	Aleksandar Roman; Bojana Jovanović	N/A	Pavle Rajović
Slovakia	8 December 2022	Martin Haring; Viktória Chladoňová	N/A	Matthias Schwarzbacher
Spain	15 January 2023	Felipe Orts; Lucía González	Gonzalo Inguanzo	Gorka Corres; Marta Cano
Sweden	27 November 2022	David Risberg; Tilda Hylén	N/A	Paul Greijus; Stina Kagevi
Switzerland	15 January 2023	Timon Rüegg; Alessandra Keller	Dario Lillo; Monique Halter	Nicolas Halter; Jana Glaus
United States	11 December 2022	Curtis White; Clara Honsinger	Andrew Strohmeyer; Madigan Munro	Andrew August; Kaya Musgrave
