= Swiss National Cyclo-cross Championships =

- The champion's jersey

Race details
- Region: Switzerland
- Discipline: Cyclo-cross
- Type: National championship
- Organiser: Swiss Cycling
- Web site: www.swiss-cycling.ch

History
- First edition: 1912
- Editions: 109 (as of 2021)

The Swiss National Cyclo-cross Championships are held annually to decide the cycling champions in the cyclo-cross discipline, across various categories.

== Men ==
=== Elite ===
Year	Location	Winner	Second	Third
1912		Henri Rheinwald		
1913		Otto Wiedmer		
1914		Otto Wiedmer		
1915		Arnold Grandjean		
1916		Arnold Grandjean	Ali Grandjean	Albert Meier
1916		Arnold Grandjean	Henri Rheinwald	Ernst Suter
1917		Ernst Kaufmann	Max Suter	Arnold Grandjean
1917		Charles Martinet	Konrad Werfeli	Max Suter
1918		Paul Hunziker	Franz Spalinger	Kilian Lack
1919		Otto Suter	Paul Hunziker	Werner Ammann
1919		Paul Wuillemin	Charles Martinet	Ali Grandjean
1920		Charles Martinet	Louis Krauss	Jean Martinet
1920		Paul Jäggi	Otto Suter	Henri Vuille
1921		Charles Martinet	Jean Martinet	Louis Krauss
1921		Othmar Eichenberger	Hans Wassmer	Kastor Notter
1922		Charles Martinet	Louis Krauss	F. Seydoux
1922		Othmar Eichenberger	Kastor Notter	Gottlieb Sager
1923		Othmar Eichenberger	Albert Blattmann	Gottlieb Sager
1923		Charles Martinet	Louis Krauss	Charles Perriere
1924		Albert Blattmann	Gottlieb Sager	Othmar Eichenberger
1925		Ernest Strobino	Louis Del Perugia	Eugen Schlegel
1926		Ernest Strobino	Karl Bohrer	Jakob Schumacher
1927		Roger Pipoz	Charles Martinet	Jakob Schumacher
1928		Roger Pipoz	Paul Wuillemin	Louis Nussbaum
1929		Karl Bossard	Franz Fischer	Jakob Caironi
1930		Karl Bossard	Jakob Caironi	Charles Martinet
1931		Karl Bossard	Paul Egli	Albert Graf
1932		Paul Egli	Emil Jäger	J. Liechti
1933		Walter Blattmann	Emil Jäger	Erwin Jaisli
1934		René Heimberg	Emil Jäger	Erwin Jaisli
1935		Fritz Hartmann	René Pedroli	Emil Jäger
1936		Fritz Hartmann	René Heimberg	Kurt Ott
1937		Karl Litschi	Kurt Ott	Walter Wettstein
1938		Kurt Ott	Fritz Hartmann	Werner Faisin
1939		Ernst Kuhn	Fritz Hartmann	Kurt Ott
1940		Fritz Hartmann	Alfred Vock	Ferdi Kübler
1941		Alfred Vock	Kurt Zaugg	Hans Maag
1942		Robert Lang	Alfred Vock	Hans Knecht
1944		Ernst Kuhn	Robert Lang	Kurt Zaugg
1945		Ferdi Kübler	Ernst Kuhn	Gottfried Weilenmann
1946		Pierre Champion	Eugen Strickler	Ernst Kuhn
1947		Fritz Schär	Hans Schütz	Ernst Schmid
1948		Pierre Champion	Roland Fantini	Fritz Schär
1949		Martin Metzger	Willy Hutmacher	Roland Fantini
1950		Martin Metzger	Albert Meier	Max Breu
1951		Pierre Champion	Roland Fantini	Martin Metzger
1952		Jean-Paul Bolay	Pierre Champion	Albert Meier
1953		Hans Bieri	Walter Boess	Roland Fantini
1954		Hans Bieri	Emmanuel Plattner	Albert Meier
1955		Hans Bieri	Albert Meier	Emmanuel Plattner
1956		Hansruedi Dubach	Hans Bieri	Albert Meier
1957		Albert Meier	Marcel Erdin	Hansruedi Dubach
1958		Emmanuel Plattner	Hans Strasser	Albert Meier
1959		Emmanuel Plattner	Otto Furrer	Roland Bochetti
1960		Arnold Hungerbühler	Otto Furrer	Roland Bochetti
1961		Emmanuel Plattner	Otto Furrer	Edwin Biefer
1962		Arnold Hungerbühler	Otto Furrer	Walter Hauser
1963		Otto Furrer	Hermann Gretener	Max Gretener
1964		Walter Hauser	Klaus Gyger	Emmanuel Plattner
1965		Emmanuel Plattner	Gustav Egolf	Max Gretener
1966		Hermann Gretener	Edwin Leutert	Gustav Egolf
1967		Emmanuel Plattner	Hermann Gretener	Peter Frischknecht
1968		Emmanuel Plattner	Ernst Boller	Hansruedi Zweifel
1969		Hermann Gretener	Peter Frischknecht	Jakob Küster
1970		Jakob Küster	Peter Frischknecht	Fredi Stucki
1971		Hermann Gretener	Jakob Küster	Fredi Stucki
1972		Hermann Gretener	Peter Frischknecht	Albert Zweifel
1973		Hermann Gretener	Peter Frischknecht	Albert Zweifel
1974		Willy Lienhard	Peter Frischknecht	Albert Zweifel
1975		Hermann Gretener	Albert Zweifel	Peter Frischknecht
1976		Albert Zweifel	Peter Frischknecht	Hermann Gretener
1977		Albert Zweifel	Peter Frischknecht	Willy Lienhard
1978		Peter Frischknecht	Albert Zweifel	Willy Lienhard
1979		Albert Zweifel	Peter Frischknecht	Fritz Saladin
1980		Albert Zweifel	Peter Frischknecht	Erwin Lienhard
1981		Albert Zweifel	Peter Frischknecht	Erwin Lienhard
1982		Albert Zweifel	Peter Frischknecht	Uli Müller
1983		Albert Zweifel	Peter Frischknecht	Gilles Blaser
1984		Albert Zweifel	Gilles Blaser	Erwin Lienhard
1985		Albert Zweifel	Gilles Blaser	Erwin Lienhard
1986		Pascal Richard	Albert Zweifel	Marcel Russenberger
1987		Pascal Richard	Marcel Russenberger	Beat Breu
1988		Beat Breu	Pascal Richard	Albert Zweifel
1989		Pascal Richard	Albert Zweifel	Hans-Rüdi Büchi
1990		Beat Breu	Niki Rüttimann	Roger Honegger
1991		Roger Honegger	Erich Holdener	Karl Kälin
1992		Beat Wabel	Beat Breu	Erich Holdener
1993		Beat Wabel	Beat Breu	Roger Honegger
1994		Beat Breu	Thomas Frischknecht	Beat Wabel
1995		Dieter Runkel	Beat Wabel	Roger Honegger
1996	Wetzikon	Dieter Runkel	Beat Wabel	Thomas Frischknecht
1997	Liestal	Thomas Frischknecht	Dieter Runkel	Beat Wabel
1998	Rüti	Beat Wabel	Dieter Runkel	Thomas Frischknecht
1999	Eschenbach	Thomas Frischknecht	Beat Wabel	Dieter Runkel
2000	Hagendorf	Beat Wabel	Thomas Frischknecht	Roland Schätti
2001	Hittnau	Beat Wabel	Roland Schätti	Alexandre Moos
2002	Hombrechtikon	Thomas Frischknecht	Jan Ramsauer	Beat Wabel
2003		Beat Wabel	Michael Baumgartner	David Rusch
2004		Christian Heule	Thomas Frischknecht	Jan Ramsauer
2005	Meilen	Florian Vogel	Christian Heule	Michael Baumgartner
2006	Meilen	Christian Heule	Alexandre Moos	Simon Zahner
2007	Steinmaur	Christian Heule	Simon Zahner	Florian Vogel
2008	Frenkendorf	Christian Heule	Thomas Frischknecht	Lukas Flückiger
2009	Wetzikon	Christian Heule	Simon Zahner	Lukas Flückiger
2010	Rennaz-Noville	Lukas Flückiger	Florian Vogel	Christian Heule
2011	Hittnau	Christian Heule	Pirmin Lang	Julien Taramarcaz
2012	Beromünster	Julien Taramarcaz	Simon Zahner	Christian Heule
2013	Steinmaur	Julien Taramarcaz	Simon Zahner	Ralph Näf
2014	Bussnang	Lukas Flückiger	Marcel Wildhaber	Simon Zahner
2015	Aigle	Julien Taramarcaz	Arnaud Grand	Lukas Flückiger
2016	Dagmersellen	Lars Forster	Julien Taramarcaz	Nicola Rohrbach
2017	Dielsdorf	Julien Taramarcaz	Lars Forster	Nicola Rohrbach
2018	Steinmaur	Lars Forster	Simon Zahner	Severin Sägesser
2019	Sion	Timon Rüegg	Andri Frischknecht	Lars Forster
2020	Baden	Lars Forster	Timon Rüegg	Nicola Rohrbach
2021	Hittnau	Kevin Kuhn	Lars Forster	Timon Rüegg
2022	Steinmaur	Kevin Kuhn	Lars Forster	Timon Rüegg

=== Under-23 ===
Year	Location	Winner	Second	Third
1997		Beat Blum		
1998		Beat Morf		
1999		Beat Morf		
2000		Matthias Kern		
2001		Michael Baumgartner		
2002		Michael Baumgartner		
2003		Michael Müller		
2004		Simon Zahner		
2005		Yves Corminboeuf		
2006		Yves Corminboeuf		
2007		Yves Corminboeuf		
2008		René Lang	Julien Taramarcaz	Guillaume Dessibourg
2009		Julien Taramarcaz	Matthias Rupp	Roman Beney
2010	Rennaz-Noville	Arnaud Grand	Matthias Rupp	Mathias Flückiger
2011	Hittnau	Arnaud Grand	Valentin Scherz	Michael Winterberg
2012	Beromünster	Fabian Lienhard	Lars Forster	Dario Stäuble
2013	Steinmaur	Lars Forster	Lukas Müller	Fabian Lienhard
2014	Bussnang	Lars Forster	Severin Saegesser	Fabian Lienhard
2015	Aigle	Fabian Lienhard	Andri Frischknecht	Timon Rüegg
2016	Dagmersellen	Timon Rüegg	Simon Vitzthum	Johan Jacobs
2017	Dielsdorf	Johan Jacobs	Timon Rüegg	Kevin Kuhn
2018	Steinmaur	Timon Rüegg	Johan Jacobs	Kevin Kuhn
2019	Sion	Loris Rouiller	Kevin Kuhn	Gilles Mottiez
2020	Baden	Kevin Kuhn	Loris Rouiller	Felix Stehli
2021	Hittnau	Dario Lillo	Loris Rouiller	Eric Lüthi
2022	Steinmaur	Dario Lillo	Loris Rouiller	Lars Sommer

=== Junior ===
Year	Winner	Second	Third	
1996		Roman Peter		
1997		David Rusch		
1998		Michael Baumgartner		
1999		Marco Baggenstoss		
2000		Daniel Parpan		
2001		Roger Jakob		
2002		Stefan Trafelet		
2003		Till Schaltegger		
2004		René Lang		
2005		Julien Taramarcaz		
2006		Matthias Fluckiger		
2007		Matthias Rupp		
2008		Matthias Rupp	Valentin Scherz	Michael Winterberg
2009		Dario Stäuble	Roger Walder	Anthony Grand
2010	Rennaz-Noville	Lars Forster	Lukas Müller	Fabian Lienhard
2011	Hittnau	Lars Forster	Fabian Lienhard	Dominic Zumstein
2012	Beromünster	Dominic Grab	Andri Frischknecht	Dominic Zumstein
2013	Steinmaur	Dominic Grab	Simon Vitzthum	Timon Rüegg
2014	Bussnang	Johan Jacobs	Timon Rüegg	Patrick Müller
2015	Aigle	Johan Jacobs	Kevin Kuhn	Joël Grab
2016	Dagmersellen	Kevin Kuhn	Mauro Schmid	Nick Burki
2017	Dielsdorf	Loris Rouiller	Mauro Schmid	Luca Schätti
2018	Steinmaur	Loris Rouiller	Luca Schätti	Felix Stehli
2019	Sion	Lars Sommer	Kedup Gyagang	Dario Lillo
2020	Baden	Dario Lillo	Jean-Luc Halter	Lars Sommer
2021	Hittnau	Jan Christen	Nils Aebersold	Finn Treudler
2022	Steinmaur	Jan Christen	Livio Stefani	Alexandre Binggeli

== Women ==
=== Elite ===
Year	Location	Winner	Second	Third
2000		Chantal Daucourt	Alexandra Bähler	Lea Fluckiger
2001		Alexandra Bähler	Franziska Ebinger	Magali Zavioz
2002		Alexandra Bähler	Vroni Fuhrer	Mireille Chabloz
2003		Alexandra Bähler	Lea Flückinger	Cindy Chabbey
2004		Alexandra Bähler	Lise Müller	Noemie Marguet
2005		Alexandra Bähler	Sonja Traxel	Jasmin Achermann
2006		Petra Henzi	Alexandra Bähler	Andrea Wölfer
2007		Katrin Leumann	Franziska Röthlin	Alexandra Bähler
2008		Jasmin Achermann	Katrin Leumann	Alexandra Bähler
2009	Wetzikon	Jasmin Achermann	Katrin Leumann	Alexandra Bähler
2010	Rennaz-Noville	Jasmin Achermann	Katrin Leumann	Jennifer Sägesser
2011	Hittnau	Jasmin Achermann	Katrin Leumann	Fabienne Niederberger
2012	Beromünster	Jasmin Achermann	Katrin Leumann	Lise-Marie Henzelin
2013	Steinmaur	Jasmin Achermann	Katrin Leumann	Lise-Marie Henzelin
2014	Bussnang	Sina Frei	Katrin Leumann	Jane Nüssli
2015	Aigle	Sina Frei	Olivia Hottinger	Milena Landtwing
2016	Dagmersellen	Sina Frei	Nicole Koller	Lise-Marie Henzelin
2017	Dielsdorf	Jasmin Egger-Achermann	Lise-Marie Henzelin	Nicole Koller
2018	Steinmaur	Jasmin Egger-Achermann	Katrin Leumann	Svenja Wüthrich
2019	Sion	Jolanda Neff	Nicole Koller	Lara Krähemann
2020	Baden	Zina Barhoumi	Chrystelle Baumann	Tanja Blickenstorfer
2021	Hittnau	Nicole Koller	Zina Barhoumi	Charline Fragnière
2022	Steinmaur	Alessandra Keller	Rebekka Estermann	Lise-Marie Henzelin

== See also ==
- Swiss National Road Race Championships
- Swiss National Time Trial Championships
- Swiss National Mountain Bike Championships
