= Dario Lillo =

Swiss cyclist

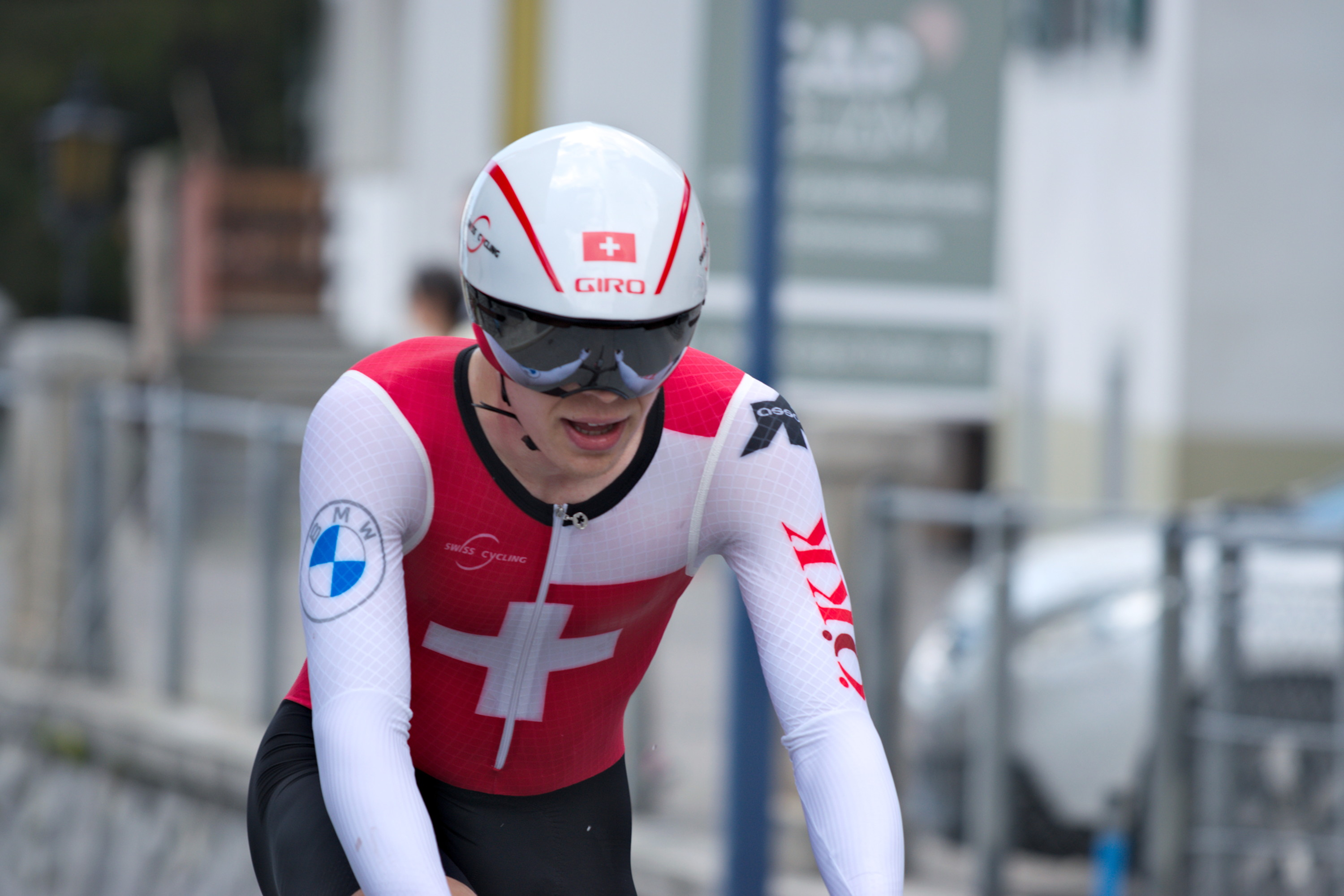
- Lillo at the 2022 Tour de Romandie

Personal information
- Born: 17 April 2002 (age 24)
- Height: 1.85 m (6 ft 1 in)

Cycling career
- Sport: Cycling
- Current team: Q36.5 Continental Team
- Disciplines: Cyclo-cross; Cross-country; Road
- Role: Rider

Professional team
- 2023–: Q36.5 Continental Team

Major wins
- Mountain bike XC World Cup 1 individual win (2026)
Medal record
Representing Switzerland
Men's Mountain bike racing
World Championships
| Gold medal – first place | 2022 Les Gets | Team relay |
| Gold medal – first place | 2023 Glasgow | Team relay |
| Silver medal – second place | 2024 Vallnord | Under-23 Cross-country |
| Bronze medal – third place | 2023 Glasgow | Under-23 Cross-country |
European Championships
| Gold medal – first place | 2019 Brno | Team relay |
| Silver medal – second place | 2023 Krynica-Zdrój | Under-23 Cross-country |

Dario Lillo (born 17 April 2002) is a Swiss cyclist, who currently rides for UCI Continental team Q36.5 Continental Team.

== Major results ==
=== Cyclo-cross ===
2018–2019
3rd National Junior Championships
2019–2020
1st National Junior Championships
1st Junior Illnau
Junior EKZ CrossTour

1st Meilen
3rd Hittnau

2nd Overall UCI Junior World Cup

1st Hoogerheide
2nd Namur
2nd Heusden-Zolder

3rd UEC European Junior Championships
4th UCI World Junior Championships
2020–2021
1st National Under-23 Championships
2021–2022
1st National Under-23 Championships
3rd Hittnau
2022–2023
1st National Under-23 Championships
X2O Badkamers Trophy

3rd Baal

UCI Under-23 World Cup

5th Besançon

2023–2024
1st National Under-23 Championships
3rd Overall Swiss Cup

2nd Hittnau
3rd Schneisingen
3rd Steinmaur

2024–2025
1st Overall Swiss Cup

1st Schneisingen
1st Mettmenstetten
2nd Steinmaur
2nd Hittnau

2025–2026
2nd National Championships

=== Mountain bike ===
2019
1st Team relay, UEC European Championships
1st Cross-country, National Junior Championships
2022
1st Team relay, UCI World Championships
UCI Under-23 XCO World Cup

3rd Albstadt
3rd Nové Město

2023
UCI World Championships

1st Team relay
3rd Under-23 cross-country

2nd Cross-country, UEC European Under-23 Championships
4th Overall UCI Under-23 XCO World Cup

1st Lenzerheide
2nd Nové Město
2nd Leogang

4th Overall UCI Under-23 XCC World Cup

1st Lenzerheide

2024
UCI Under-23 XCO World Cup

1st Mont-Sainte-Anne
2nd Lake Placid
5th Crans-Montana

UCI Under-23 XCC World Cup

1st Lake Placid
1st Mont-Sainte-Anne
2nd Mairiporã
2nd Nové Město

Under-23 Ökk Bike Revolution

1st Davos

2nd Cross-country, UCI World Under-23 Championships
4th Cross-country, UEC European Under-23 Championships
2025
1st Son
Bike Revolution

2nd Gruyères
2nd Davos

2026
UCI XCO World Cup

1st Mona Yongpyong

UCI XCC World Cup

3rd Mona Yongpyong
3rd Nové Město
