= Swiss National Mountain Bike Championships =

- The champion's jersey

Race details
- Region: Switzerland
- Discipline: Mountain biking
- Type: National championship
- Organiser: Swiss Cycling
- Web site: www.swiss-cycling.ch

History
- First edition: 1994

The Swiss National Mountain Bike Championships are held annually to decide the cycling champions in the mountain biking discipline, across various categories.

== Men ==
=== Cross-country ===
Year	Winner	Second	Third
1994	Thomas Frischknecht	Marcel Russenberger	Andreas Büsser
1995	Marcel Heller	Arno Küttel	Albert Iten
1996	Thomas Frischknecht	Reto Wysseier	Marcel Heller
1997	Thomas Frischknecht	Beat Wabel	Roger Beuchat
1998	Thomas Frischknecht	Markus Binkert	Beat Wabel
1999	Christoph Sauser	Markus Binkert	Thomas Hochstrasser
2000	Christoph Sauser	Thomas Hochstrasser	Markus Binkert
2001	Christoph Sauser	Thomas Hochstrasser	Thomas Kalberer
2002	Christoph Sauser	Thomas Frischknecht	Silvio Bundi
2003	Christoph Sauser	Silvio Bundi	Daniel Solèr
2004	Ralph Näf	Silvio Bundi	Beat Merk
2005	Balz Weber	Thomas Frischknecht	Silvio Bundi
2006	Christoph Sauser	Martin Gujan	Florian Vogel
2007	Jürg Graf	Lukas Flückiger	Florian Vogel
2008	Florian Vogel	Lukas Flückiger	Jürg Graf
2009	Florian Vogel	Martin Gujan	Lukas Flückiger
2010	Nino Schurter	Florian Vogel	Lukas Flückiger
2011	Florian Vogel	Nino Schurter	Balz Weber
2012	Nino Schurter	Florian Vogel	Mathias Flückiger
2013	Nino Schurter	Lukas Flückiger	Fabian Giger
2014	Nino Schurter	Fabian Giger	Florian Vogel
2015	Nino Schurter	Florian Vogel	Lukas Flückiger
2016	Nino Schurter	Matthias Stirnemann	Lukas Flückiger
2017	Nino Schurter	Mathias Flückiger	Florian Vogel
2018	Mathias Flückiger	Florian Vogel	Andri Frischknecht
2019	Nino Schurter	Mathias Flückiger	Florian Vogel
2020	Nino Schurter	Mathias Flückiger	Lars Forster
2021	Mathias Flückiger	Nino Schurter	Marcel Guerrini
2022	Mathias Flückiger	Vital Albin	Andri Frischknecht

=== Cross-country eliminator ===
Year	Winner	Second	Third
2012	Thomas Litscher	Stefan Peter	Nicola Rohrbach
2013	Marcel Wildhaber	Thomas Litscher	Patrick Lüthi
2014	Martin Fanger	Matthias Allenspach	Thomas Litscher
2015	Marcel Wildhaber	Patrick Lüthi	Ralph Näf

=== Downhill ===
Year	Winner	Second	Third
1994	Urs Thoma	Marc Schnyder	Albert Iten
1995	Bruno Tschanz	Thomas Hochstrasser	Dieter Lüscher
1996	Andreas Steffen	Urs Thoma	Christoph Sauser
1997	Andy Büeler	Urs Thoma	Michel Joseph
1998	Andreas Steffen	Michel Joseph	Janes Grasic
1999	Claudio Caluori	Michel Joseph	René Wildhaber
2000	Claudio Caluori	René Wildhaber	Simon Schwander
2001	Claudio Caluori	René Wildhaber	Thomas Ryser
2002	Samuel Zbinden	Damien Mermoud	Thomas Ryser
2003	Claudio Caluori	Damien Mermoud	Thomas Ryser
2004	Damien Mermoud	Samuel Zbinden	Marcel Beer
2005	Damien Mermoud	Claudio Caluori	Samuel Zbinden
2006	Damien Mermoud	Markus Schwab	Claudio Caluori
2007	Nick Beer	Markus Schwab	Samuel Zbinden
2008	Nick Beer	Martin Frei	Samuel Zbinden
2009	Nick Beer	Samuel Zbinden	Marcel Beer
2010	Nick Beer	Dominik Gspan	Ludovic May
2011	Nick Beer	Lutz Weber	Samuel Zbinden
2012	Lars Peyer	Ludovic May	Lutz Weber
2013	Nick Beer	Felix Klee	Noel Niederberger
2014	Nick Beer	Noel Niederberger	Lutz Weber
2015	Maxime Chapuis	Nick Beer	Basil Weber
2016	Lutz Weber	Noel Niederberger	Maxime Chapuis
2017	Lutz Weber	Basil Weber	Noel Niederberger
2018	Noel Niederberger	Basil Weber	Mirco Widmer

=== Marathon ===
Year	Winner	Second	Third
2004	Johann Tschopp	Christof Bischof	Christian Heule
2005	Balz Weber	Sandro Spaeth	Silvio Bundi
2006	Christoph Sauser	Thomas Stoll	Thomas Zahnd
2007	Silvio Bundi	Lukas Buchli	Alexandre Moos
2008	Lukas Buchli	Sandro Spaeth	Andreas Kugler
2009	Alexandre Moos	Lukas Buchli	Urs Huber
2010	Andreas Kugler	Ralph Näf	Thomas Stoll
2011	Urs Huber	Alexandre Moos	Thomas Stoll
2012	Christoph Sauser	Lukas Buchli	Urs Huber
2013	Christoph Sauser	Hansueli Stauffer	Julien Taramarcaz
2014	Urs Huber	Lukas Buchli	Jérémy Huguenin
2015	Johann Tschopp	Lukas Buchli	Hansueli Stauffer
2016	Urs Huber	Hansueli Stauffer	Johann Tschopp
2017	Konny Looser	Marc Stutzmann	Oliver Zurbrügg
2018	Urs Huber	Hansueli Stauffer	Konny Looser
2019	Urs Huber	Hansueli Stauffer	Casey South
2020	Martin Fanger	Urs Huber	Lukas Flückiger

=== Four cross ===
Year	Winner	Second	Third
1998	Andy Büeler	Michel Joseph	Andreas Steffen
1999	Claudio Caluori	Michel Joseph	Markus Hartmann
2000	Claudio Caluori	Jeffrey Archer	Remo Heutschi
2001	Claudio Caluori	Damian Mermoud	Janes Grasic
2002	Roger Rinderknecht	Pascal Seydoux	Simon Schwander
2003	Marcel Beer	Remo Heutschi	Samuel Zbinden
2004	Roger Rinderknecht	Remo Heutschi	Damian Mermoud
2005	Reto Schmid	Ramon Hunziker	Marcel Beer
2006	Reto Schmid	Nick Beer	Samuel Zbinden
2007	Dominik Gspan	Claudio Caluori	Fabian Küttel
2010	Pascal Seydoux	Adrian Weiss	Simon Waldburger
2011	Pascal Seydoux	Sidney Gerber	Simon Waldburger
2012	Adrian Weiss	Simon Waldburger	Noel Niederberger
2013	Simon Waldburger	Marco Muff	Mirco Weiss
2014	Jan Kissling	Adrian Weiss	Marco Muff
2016	Marco Muff	Simon Waldburger	Fabian Gärtner

== Women ==
=== Cross-country ===
Year	Winner	Second	Third
1994	Silvia Fürst	Chantal Daucourt	Brigitta Kasper
1995	Daniela Gassmann	Chantal Daucourt	Silvia Fürst
1996	Daniela Gassmann	Silvia Fürst	Chantal Daucourt
1997	Chantal Daucourt	Daniela Gassmann	Barbara Blatter
1998	Chantal Daucourt	Barbara Blatter	Silvia Fürst
1999	Barbara Blatter	Chantal Daucourt	Maroussia Rusca
2000	Barbara Blatter	Chantal Daucourt	Petra Henzi
2001	Barbara Blatter	Petra Henzi	Daniela Gassmann
2002	Barbara Blatter	Sonja Traxel	Petra Henzi
2003	Petra Henzi	Maroussia Rusca	Franziska Röthlin
2004	Katrin Leumann	Andrea Huser	Barbara Blatter
2005	Petra Henzi	Katrin Leumann	Maroussia Rusca
2006	Petra Henzi	Renata Bucher	Daniela Louis
2007	Petra Henzi	Renata Bucher	Sarah Koba
2008	Katrin Leumann	Marielle Saner-Guinchard	Maroussia Rusca
2009	Katrin Leumann	Esther Süss	Petra Henzi
2010	Esther Süss	Nathalie Schneitter	Marielle Saner-Guinchard
2011	Nathalie Schneitter	Esther Süss	Marielle Saner-Guinchard
2012	Sarah Koba	Esther Süss	Corina Gantenbein
2013	Katrin Leumann	Esther Süss	Kathrin Stirnemann
2014	Jolanda Neff	Kathrin Stirnemann	Esther Süss
2015	Kathrin Stirnemann	Nathalie Schneitter	Jolanda Neff
2016	Jolanda Neff	Linda Indergand	Kathrin Stirnemann
2017	Jolanda Neff	Linda Indergand	Corina Gantenbein
2018	Jolanda Neff	Ramona Forchini	Linda Indergand
2019	Jolanda Neff	Kathrin Stirnemann	Ramona Forchini
2020	Jolanda Neff	Sina Frei	Linda Indergand
2021	Jolanda Neff	Alessandra Keller	Sina Frei
2022	Alessandra Keller	Linda Indergand	Sina Frei

=== Cross-country eliminator ===
Year	Winner	Second	Third
2012	Jolanda Neff	Kathrin Stirnemann	Katrin Leumann
2013	Jolanda Neff	Andrea Waldis	Linda Indergand
2014	Kathrin Stirnemann	Jolanda Neff	Linda Indergand
2015	Linda Indergand	Kathrin Stirnemann	Michelle Hediger

=== Downhill ===
Year	Winner	Second	Third
1994	Rita Bürgi	Brigitta Kasper	Annemaria Cavadini
1995	Rita Bürgi	Brigitta Kasper	Sonja Boss
1996	Rita Bürgi	Brigitta Kasper	Marielle Saner
1997	Marielle Saner	Carole Vuillaume	Brigitta Kasper
1998	Marielle Saner	Brigitta Kasper	Sarah Stieger
1999	Marielle Saner	Sarah Stieger	Petra Winterhalder
2000	Sarah Stieger	Sari Jörgensen	Marielle Saner
2001	Marielle Saner	Amélie Thévoz	Pasqualine Reusser
2002	Marielle Saner	Amélie Thévoz	Sarah Stieger
2003	Amélie Thévoz	Marielle Saner	Pasqualine Reusser
2004	Sari Jörgensen	Marielle Saner	Amélie Thévoz
2005	Marielle Saner	Sari Jörgensen	Pasqualine Reusser
2006	Miriam Ruchti	Pasqualine Reusser	Silja Stadler
2007	Marielle Saner	Emilie Siegenthaler	Daniela Bossard
2008	Emilie Siegenthaler	Pasqualine Reusser	Janine Hürlimann
2009	Emilie Siegenthaler	Martina Brühlmann	Sidonie Jolidon
2010	Emilie Siegenthaler	Martina Brühlmann	Miriam Ruchti
2011	Emilie Siegenthaler	Miriam Ruchti	Carina Cappellari
2012	Miriam Ruchti	Martina Brühlmann	Alba Wunderlin
2013	Emilie Siegenthaler	Martina Brühlmann	Alba Wunderlin
2014	Emilie Siegenthaler	Alba Wunderlin	Carina Cappellari
2015	Emilie Siegenthaler	Carina Cappellari	Gérladine Fink
2016	Lea Rutz	Carina Cappellari	Gérladine Fink
2017	Carina Cappellari	Lea Rutz	Alexandra Wohlgensinger
2018	Carina Cappellari	Janine Hübscher	Camille Balanche

=== Marathon ===
Year	Winner	Second	Third
2004	Andrea Huser	Daniela Louis	Petra Henzi
2005	Petra Henzi	Esther Süss	Anita Steiner
2006	Petra Henzi	Esther Süss	Dolores Rupp
2007	Dolores Rupp	Anita Steiner	Sarah Koba
2008	Esther Süss	Erika Dicht	Antonia Wipfli
2009	Esther Süss	Erika Dicht	Antonia Wipfli
2010	Esther Süss	Petra Henzi	Fabienne Heinzmann
2011	Milena Landtwing	Nadia Walker	Andrea Kuster
2012	Esther Süss	Nadia Walker	Sofia Pezzatti
2013	Ariane Kleinhans	Milena Landtwing	Cornelia Hug
2014	Esther Süss	Ariane Kleinhans	Milena Landtwing
2015	Esther Süss	Ariane Kleinhans	Milena Landtwing
2016	Ariane Kleinhans	Nadia Walker	Esther Süss
2017	Esther Süss	Florence Darbellay	Andrea Ming
2018	Ariane Lüthi	Esther Süss	Andrea Ming
2019	Ariane Lüthi	Esther Süss	Andrea Ming
2020	Steffi Häberlin	Ariane Lüthi	Irina Luetzelschwab

=== Four cross ===
Year	Winner	Second	Third
1998	Sarah Stieger	Marielle Saner	Brigitta Kasper
1999	Marielle Saner	Sarah Stieger	Sandra Hohl
2000	Sari Jörgensen	Sarah Stieger	Marielle Saner
2001	Marielle Saner	Amélie Thévoz	Sarah Stieger
2004	Sari Jörgensen	Marielle Saner	Florence Scheibli
2005	Sari Jörgensen	Marielle Saner	Lucia Oetjen
2007	Lucia Oetjen	Marielle Saner	Andrea Kieser
2010	Emilie Siegenthaler	Rachel Seydoux	Michelle Vollenweider
2011	Lucia Oetjen	Andrea Kiser	Carolin Gehrig
2014	Lucia Oetjen	Geraldine Fink	Rachel Friedrich

== See also ==
- Swiss National Road Race Championships
- Swiss National Time Trial Championships
- Swiss National Cyclo-cross Championships
