= Kevin Kuhn =

Swiss cyclo-cross cyclist

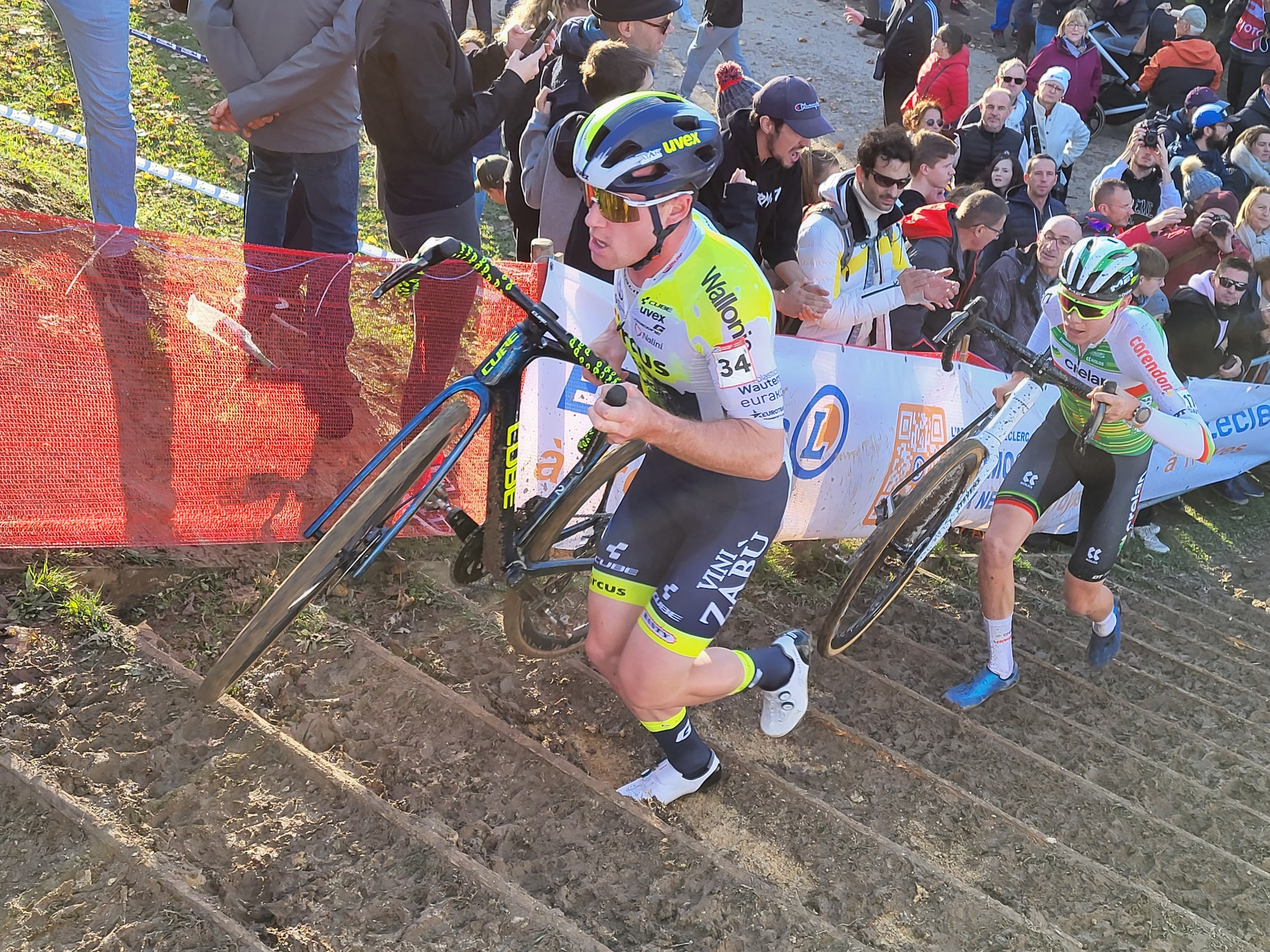
- Kuhn in 2023

Personal information
- Full name: Kevin Kuhn
- Born: 18 February 1998 (age 28) Chêne-Bougeries, Switzerland
- Height: 1.74 m (5 ft 9 in)
- Weight: 69 kg (152 lb)

Cycling career
- Sport: Cycling
- Current team: Wanty–Nippo–ReUz
- Disciplines: Cyclo-cross; Road; Mountain biking
- Role: Rider

Amateur teams
- 2016–2019: VC Eschenbach
- 2018–2020: Scott Development Team (MTB)

Professional teams
- 2017: Scott Development Team (MTB)
- 2020–2023: Tormans CX Team (cyclo-cross)
- 2021–2022: Nippo–Provence–PTS Conti (road)
- 2023–: Circus–ReUz–Technord
Medal record
Men's cyclo-cross
Representing Switzerland
World Championships
Silver medal – second place	2020 Dübendorf	Under-23 Race

Kevin Kuhn (born 18 February 1998) is a Swiss multi-discipline cyclist, who currently rides for UCI Continental team Wanty–Nippo–ReUz. He won the silver medal in the men's under-23 event at the 2020 UCI Cyclo-cross World Championships in Dübendorf.

== Major results ==
=== Cyclo-cross ===
2014–2015
2nd National Junior Championships
2015–2016
1st National Junior Championships
4th UCI World Junior Championships
2016–2017
3rd National Under-23 Championships
2017–2018
3rd National Under-23 Championships
2018–2019
2nd National Under-23 Championships
2019–2020
1st National Under-23 Championships
1st Overall UCI Under-23 World Cup

1st Bern
2nd Tábor
2nd Nommay

2nd UCI World Under-23 Championships
3rd Madiswil
2020–2021
1st National Championships
1st Overall EKZ CrossTour

1st Hittnau
3rd Baden

1st Steinmaur
2021–2022
1st National Championships
1st Illnau
UCI World Cup

5th Flamanville

2022–2023
Swiss Cup

1st Mettmenstetten
1st Meilen

1st Illnau
1st Steinmaur
UCI World Cup

3rd Val di Sole

5th UEC European Championships
2023–2024
Swiss Cup

1st Mettmenstetten
1st Steinmaur

1st Illnau
2nd National Championships
2024–2025
1st Illnau
2025–2026
1st National Championships
2026–2027
5th UEC European Championships
