= 1988 UCI Cyclo-cross World Championships =

Cyclo-cross championship

- Venue: Hägendorf, Switzerland
- Date: 30–31 January 1988
- Coordinates: 47°20′N 7°51′E
- Cyclists participating: 31 (Elite); 48 (Amateurs), 46 (Juniors)
- Events: 3

The 1988 UCI Cyclo-cross World Championships were held in Hägendorf, Switzerland on 30 and 31 January 1988. It was the 39th edition of the UCI Cyclo-cross World Championships.

== Men's Elite results ==
RANK	NAME	TIME
Gold medal	Pascal Richard (SUI)	1:20:56
Silver medal	Adrie van der Poel (NED)	+ 1:40
Bronze medal	Beat Breu (SUI)	+ 1:52
4.	Albert Zweifel (SUI)	+ 4:10
5.	Christophe Lavainne (FRA)	+ 5:01
6.	Roland Liboton (BEL)	+ 5:46
7.	Hans-Rüdi Büchi (SUI)	+ 5:47
8.	Hennie Stamsnijder (NED)	+ 6:32
9.	Ivan Messelis (BEL)	+ 6:38
10.	Yvon Madiot (FRA)	+ 7:59

== Men's Amateurs results ==
RANK	NAME	TIME
Gold medal	Karel Camrda (CZE)	1:01:27
Silver medal	Roger Honegger (SUI)	+ 0:25
Bronze medal	Henrik Djernis (DEN)	+ 1:06
4.	Bruno D’Arsié (SUI)	+ 1:32
5.	Didier Martinez (FRA)	+ 1:33
6.	Vito Di Tano (ITA)	+ 1:34
7.	Dieter Runkel (SUI)	+ 1:35
8.	Bruno Lebras (FRA)	+ 3:20
9.	Timothy Gould (GBR)	+ 3:28
10.	Eric Vervaet (BEL)	+ 3:56

== Men's Juniors results ==
RANK	NAME	TIME
Gold medal	Thomas Frischknecht (SUI)	44:13
Silver medal	Mike Müller (BRD)	+ 0:23
Bronze medal	Daniel Reh (CZE)	+ 1:05
4.	Reto Matt (BRD)	+ 1:21
5.	Pascal Müller (SUI)	+ 1:25
6.	Martin Obrist (SUI)	+ 1:49
7.	Pedro Rosselle (BEL)	+ 2:29
8.	Ivan Benedetti (ITA)	+ 2:32
9.	David Pagnier (FRA)	+ 2:42
10.	Ján Žilovec (CZE)	+ 2:43
