= Loris Rouiller =

Swiss cyclist

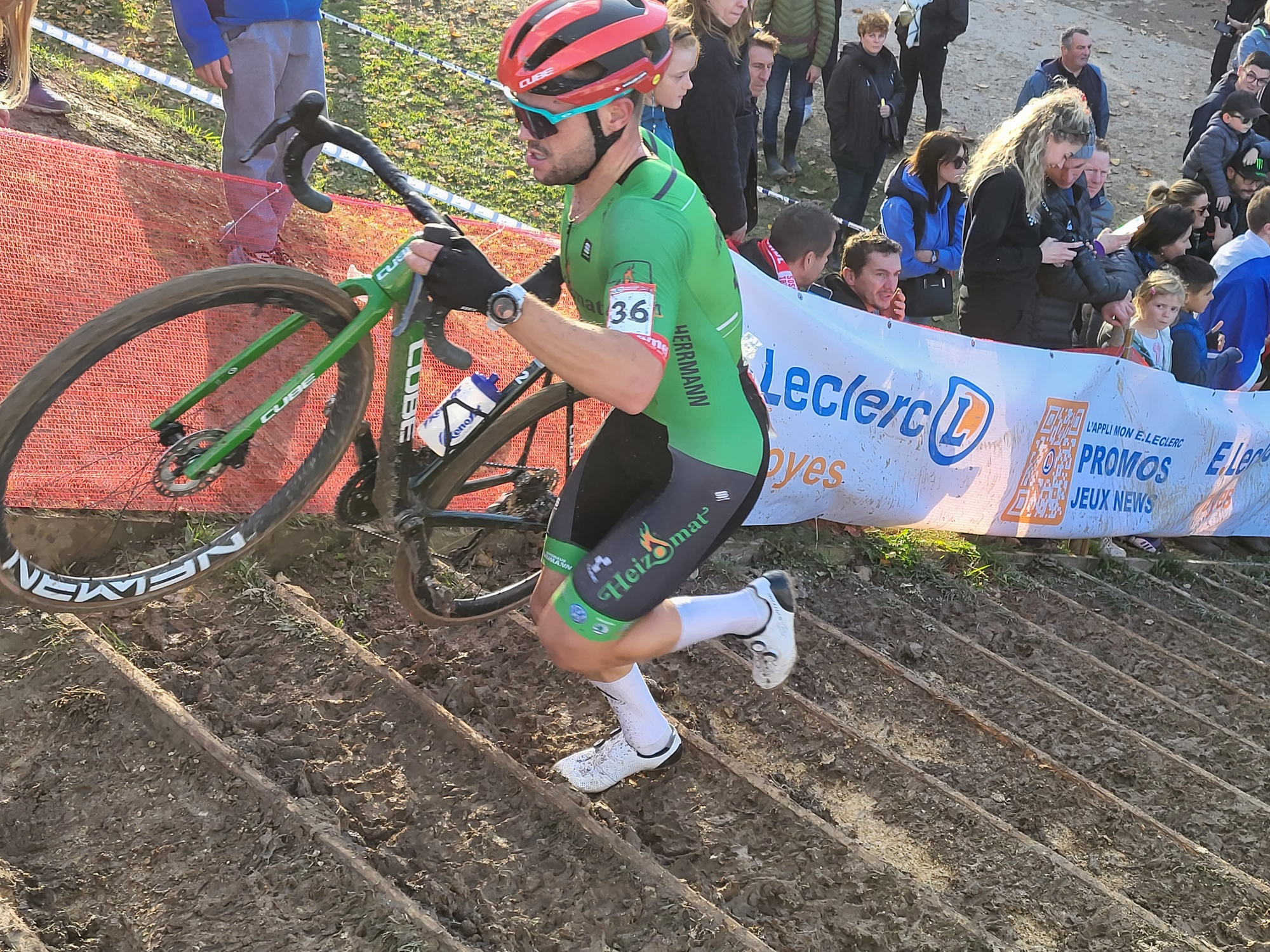
- Rouiller in 2023

Personal information
- Born: 21 February 2000 (age 26) Belmont-sur-Lausanne, Switzerland

Cycling career
- Sport: Cycling
- Current team: Heizomat Radteam p/b Kloster Kitchen (cyclo-cross); Elite Fondations Cycling Team (road)
- Disciplines: Cyclo-cross; Road; Mountain biking
- Role: Rider

Amateur team
- 2024–: Elite Fondations Cycling Team

Professional teams
- 2019–2020: Alpecin–Fenix
- 2021: Alpecin–Fenix Development Team
- 2022–2023: Cross Team Legendre
- 2023–: Heizomat Radteam p/b Kloster Kitchen

Loris Rouiller (born 21 February 2000) is a Swiss cyclist, who currently rides for UCI Cyclo-cross team Heizomat Radteam p/b Kloster Kitchen and amateur team Elite Fondations Cycling Team in road cycling. He primarily competes in cyclo-cross, but also on the road and in mountain biking.

== Major results ==
=== Cyclo-cross ===
2016–2017
1st National Junior Championships
2nd Steinmaur
Junior Soudal Classics

3rd Leuven

2017–2018
1st UEC European Junior Championships
1st National Junior Championships
Junior DVV Trophy

1st Baal
1st Hamme
1st Ronse
2nd Loenhout

UCI Junior World Cup

1st Namur

Junior Superprestige

1st Gieten

Junior Brico Cross

1st Meulebeke
2nd Hulst

2018–2019
1st National Under-23 Championships
Under-23 Brico Cross

1st Hulst

Under-23 DVV Trophy

3rd Loenhout
3rd Baal

2019–2020
1st Munich
1st Steinmaur
Under-23 DVV Trophy

1st Loenhout

2nd National Under-23 Championships
UCI Under-23 World Cup

3rd Heusden-Zolder
3rd Bern

2020–2021
2nd National Under-23 Championships
2nd Steinmaur
2021–2022
Coupe de France

1st Troyes
1st Pierric
2nd Quelneuc

Under-23 Coupe de France

1st Troyes
1st Pierric
1st Quelneuc

1st Hittnau
1st Brumath
2nd National Under-23 Championships
2nd Destil
2022–2023
1st Overall Swiss Cup

1st Bulle
3rd Hittnau

1st Dijon
2nd Overall Coupe de France

2nd Troyes II
3rd Camors I
3rd Nommay II

3rd Brumath
2023–2024
USCX Series

1st Roanoke I
1st Roanoke II
3rd Rochester I
3rd Rochester II

1st 4 Bikes Festival
3rd Bensheim
2024–2025
Coupe de France

1st Nommay I
1st Nommay II

1st Bensheim
2nd Illnau
3rd Brumath
3rd Steinmaur
2025–2026
3rd National Championships

=== Road ===
2017
4th Road race, National Junior Championships
