= Caironi =

Caironi is an Italian surname. Notable people with the surname include:

- Jakob Caironi (1902–1968), Swiss cyclist
- Martina Caironi (born 1989), Italian athlete
