= Timon Rüegg =

Swiss cyclist (born 1996)

Personal information
- Born: 24 January 1996 (age 30) Zürich, Switzerland
- Height: 1.77 m (5 ft 10 in)
- Weight: 66 kg (146 lb)

Cycling career
- Sport: Cycling
- Current team: Heizomat Radteam p/b Kloster Kitchen
- Disciplines: Road; Cyclo-cross
- Role: Rider

Amateur team
- 2018: VC Steinmaur

Professional teams
- 2017: Scott Development MTB Team
- 2019–2020: Swiss Racing Academy
- 2021–2023: Cross Team Legendre
- 2023–: Heizomat Radteam p/b Kloster Kitchen

Timon Rüegg (born 24 January 1996) is a Swiss road and cyclo-cross cyclist, who currently rides for UCI Cyclo-cross Pro Team Heizomat Radteam p/b Kloster Kitchen.

== Major results ==
=== Cyclo-cross ===
2012–2013
2nd National Junior Championships
2013–2014
2nd National Junior Championships
2014–2015
3rd National Under-23 Championships
2015–2016
1st National Under-23 Championships
2016–2017
2nd National Under-23 Championships
2017–2018
1st National Under-23 Championships
2018–2019
1st National Championships
2019–2020
1st Madiswil
2nd National Championships
3rd Steinmaur
2020–2021
2nd Overall EKZ CrossTour

2nd Hittnau

3rd National Championships
2021–2022
Stockholm Weekend

1st Täby Park
1st Stockholm

1st Meilen
2nd Overall Coupe de France

1st Bagnoles-de-l'Orne Day 1
2nd Troyes
2nd Quelneuc
2nd Bagnoles de l'Orne Day 2

2nd Illnau
3rd National Championships
3rd Lützelbach
2022–2023
1st National Championships
Coupe de France

2nd Camors I
2nd Troyes I

2nd Fayetteville
2nd Meilen
3rd Mettmenstetten
UCI World Cup

5th Val di Sole

2023–2024
1st National Championships
Swiss Cup

1st Hittnau
1st Schneisingen

1st Brugherio
1st Bad Salzdetfurth I
2nd Bad Salzdetfurth II
2nd Illnau

=== Road ===
2020
7th Overall Tour Bitwa Warszawska 1920
2022
Combativity award Overall Tour Alsace
