= Linda Indergand =

Swiss cyclist (born 1993)

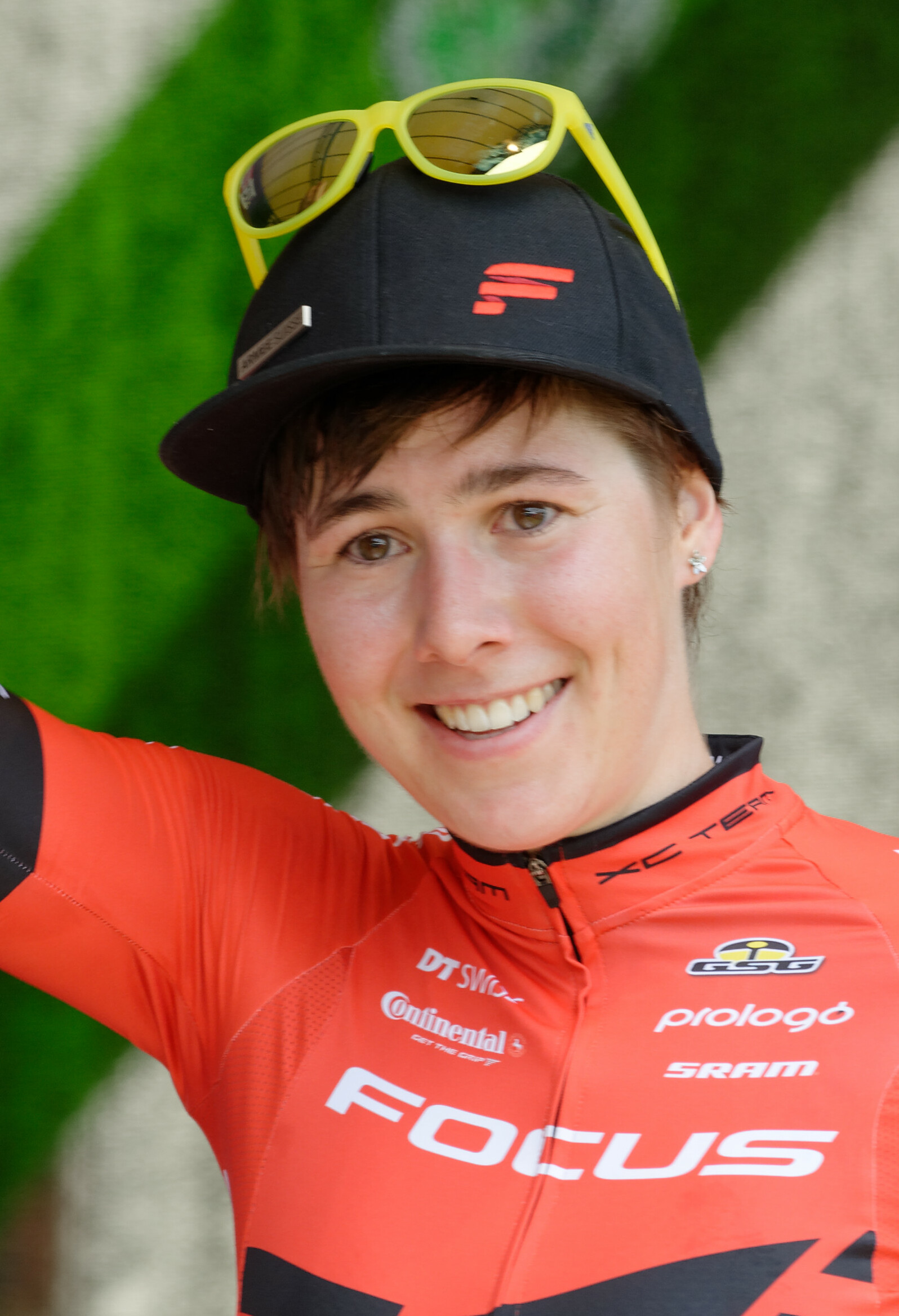
- Indergand in 2017

Personal information
- Born: 13 July 1993 (age 33) Altdorf, Switzerland

Cycling career
- Sport: Cycling
- Role: Rider

Major wins
- Mountain bike National XC Championships (2024)
Medal record
Women's Mountain bike racing
Representing Switzerland
Olympic Games
Bronze medal – third place	2020 Tokyo	Cross-country

Linda Indergand (born 13 July 1993) is a Swiss racing cyclist. She rode at the 2014 UCI Road World Championships. She was on the start list of the 2018 Cross Country European Championships and finished in tenth place. On 27 July 2021, she won a bronze medal at the 2020 Summer Olympics in Tokyo. Her teammates, Jolanda Neff and Sina Frei, won the gold and silver medals, marking the first time there had been a Swiss podium at the Olympics since 1936 and the first time a nation won all three medals in a cycling event since 1904.

== Major results ==
2021
3rd Cross-country, Olympic Games
2023
Swiss Bike Cup

1st Gstaad
2nd Lugano
3rd Basel

3rd Cross-country, National Championships
2024
1st Cross-country, National Championships
