= Nicole Koller =

Swiss cyclist (born 1997)

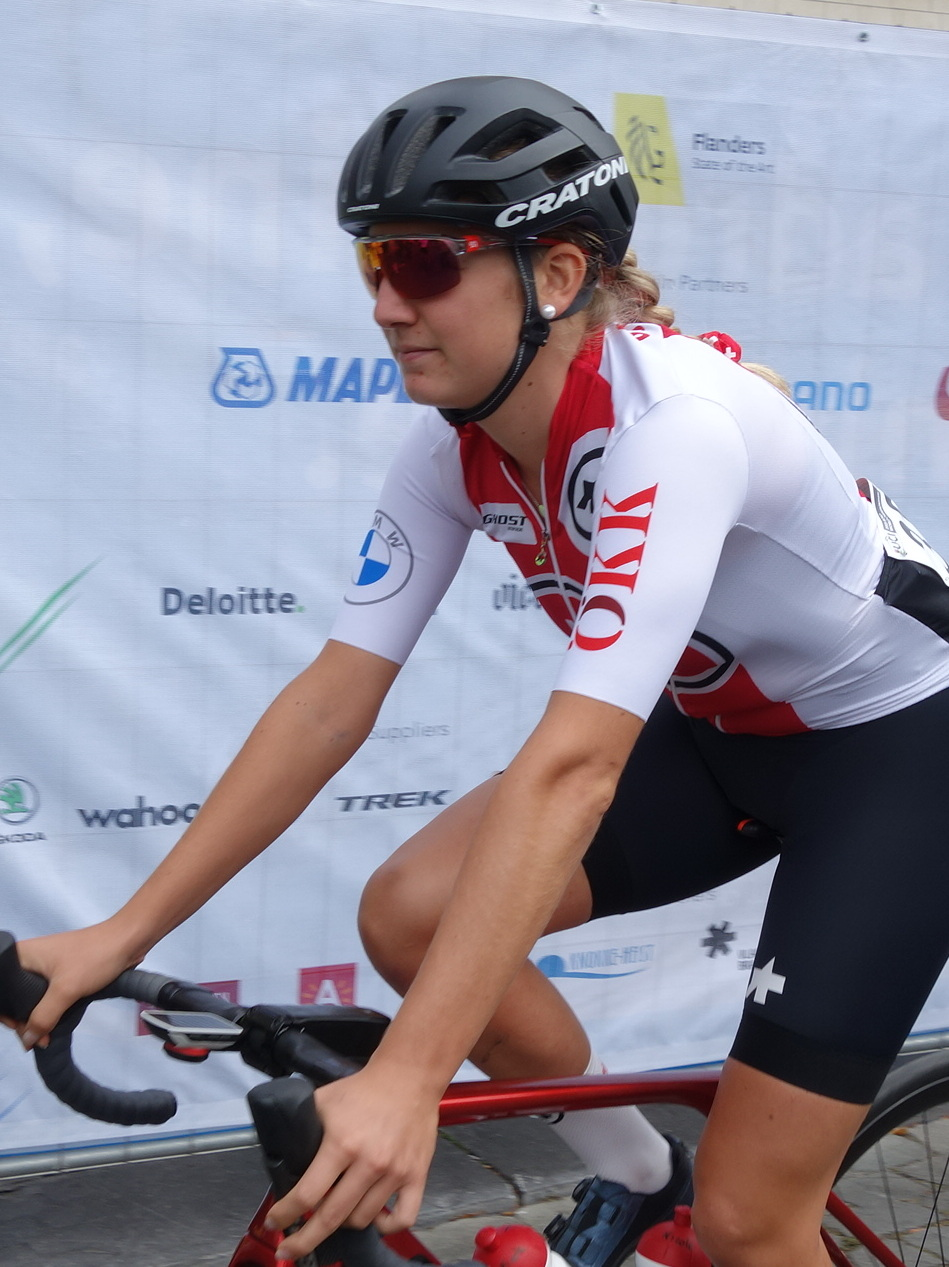
- Koller at the 2021 UCI Road World Championships

Personal information
- Born: 2 May 1997 (age 29) Wetzikon, Switzerland
- Height: 1.70 m (5 ft 7 in)
- Weight: 63 kg (139 lb)

Cycling career
- Sport: Cycling
- Disciplines: Mountain biking; Cyclo-cross; Road
- Role: Rider
Medal record
Representing Switzerland
Women's road bicycle racing
World Championships
Gold medal – first place	2022 Wollongong	Mixed team relay
Gold medal – first place	2023 Glasgow	Mixed team relay
Women's Mountain bike racing
European Championships
Bronze medal – third place	2024 Cheile Grădiștei	Cross-country short track

Nicole Koller (born 2 May 1997) is a Swiss professional racing cyclist.

She competed at the 2021 UCI Road World Championships in the mixed team relay and the women's road race events. The following year, she won the gold medal with the Swiss national team in the mixed team relay.

== Major results ==
=== Cyclo-cross ===
2013–2014
3rd Baden
2014–2015
EKZ CrossTour

2nd Baden
2nd Dielsdorf

2015–2016
2nd National Championships
EKZ CrossTour

3rd Hittnau

2016–2017
1st Overall EKZ CrossTour

1st Hittnau

1st Steinmaur
3rd National Championships
2017–2018
EKZ CrossTour

3rd Eschenbach

2018–2019
2nd National Championships
2019–2020
EKZ CrossTour

2nd Meilen

2020–2021
1st National Championships
1st Overall EKZ CrossTour

2nd Bern

=== Mountain bike ===
2014
1st Cross-country, UCI World Junior Championships
2nd Cross-country, UEC European Junior Championships
2015
2nd Cross-country, UEC European Junior Championships
3rd Cross-country, UCI World Junior Championships
2024
1st Overall Cape Epic (with Anne Terpstra)
2026
UCI XCO World Cup

4th Nové Město

=== Road ===
2014
2nd Road race, UEC European Junior Championships
3rd Road race, National Junior Championships
2015
2nd Road race, National Junior Championships
2022
1st Team relay, UCI World Championships
