= Severin Sägesser =

Swiss cyclist

Severin Saegesser
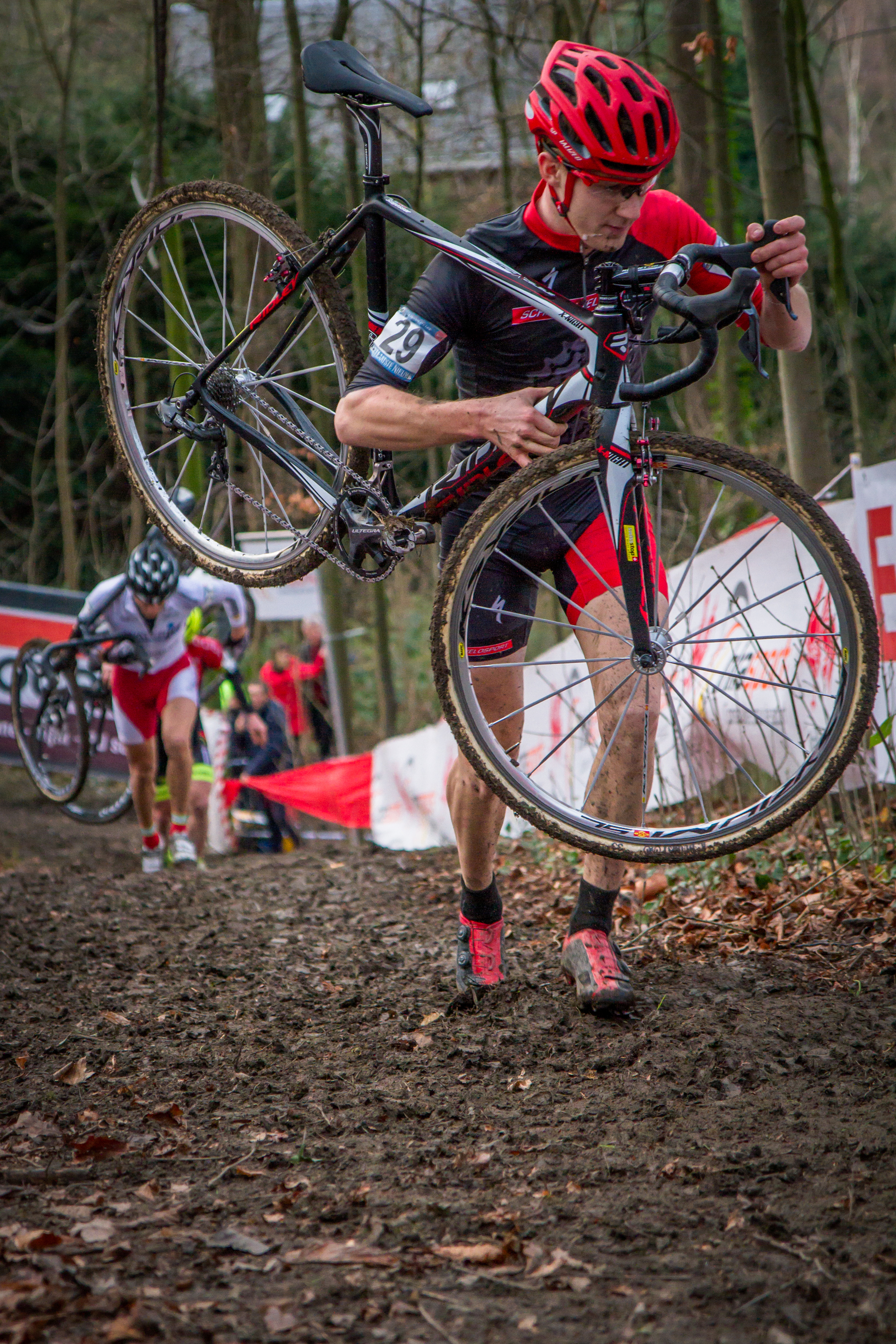

Personal information
- Born: 11 July 1992 (age 34)

Cycling career
- Sport: Cycling
- Discipline: Cyclo-cross
- Role: Rider

Severin Sägesser (born 11 July 1992) is a Swiss cyclo-cross cyclist. He represented his nation in the men's elite event at the 2016 UCI Cyclo-cross World Championships in Heusden-Zolder.

== Major results ==
2013–2014
2nd National Under-23 Championships
2016–2017
3rd Flückiger Cross Madiswil
2017–2018
3rd National Championships
