= Lars Forster =

Swiss cyclist and mountain biker (born 1993)

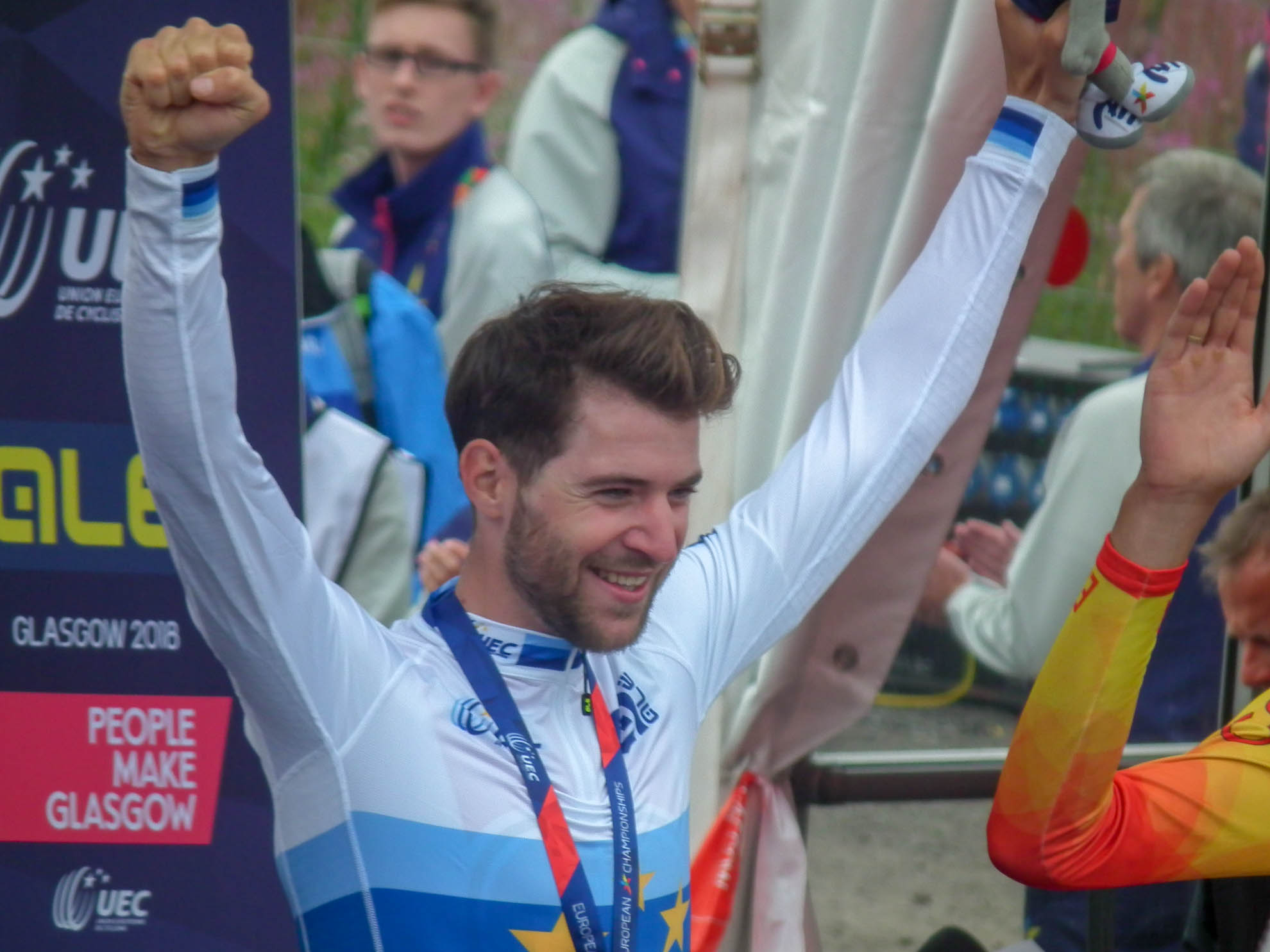
- Lars Forster at the 2018 European Mountain Bike Championships

Personal information
- Full name: Lars Forster
- Born: 1 August 1993 (age 33) Locarno, Switzerland
- Height: 177 cm (5 ft 10 in)
- Weight: 68 kg (150 lb)

Cycling career
- Sport: Cycling
- Current team: Thomus Maxon
- Disciplines: Cyclo-cross, Cross-country mountain biking
- Role: Rider

Professional teams
- 2016–2018: BMC Mountainbike Racing
- 2019–2022: Scott–Sram Team
- 2023-: Thömus Maxon

Major wins
- Cyclo-cross National Championships (2016, 2018, 2020) Mountain bike European XC Championships (2018, 2021) XC World Cup 2 individual wins (2019, 2023) Cape Epic (2019)

Lars Forster (born 1 August 1993) is a Swiss cyclo-cross and cross-country mountain biker. He represented his nation in the men's elite race at the 2016 UCI Cyclo-cross World Championships in Heusden-Zolder, and in the men's cross-country race at the 2016 Summer Olympics in Rio de Janeiro. He was on the start list for the 2018 Cross-country European Championship and he finished 1st.

== Major results ==
=== Cyclo-cross ===
2009–2010
1st National Junior Championships
2010–2011
1st UEC European Junior Championships
1st National Junior Championships
1st Junior Aigle
3rd Overall UCI Junior World Cup

1st Heusden-Zolder
5th Koksijde
5th Kalmthout

2011–2012
2nd National Under-23 Championships
2012–2013
1st National Under-23 Championships
2013–2014
1st National Under-23 Championships
2015–2016
1st National Championships
2nd Luzern
EKZ CrossTour

3rd Meilen

3rd Sion-Valais
2016–2017
1st Dagmersellen
2nd National Championships
EKZ CrossTour

2nd Meilen

2017–2018
1st National Championships
1st Madiswil
1st Dagmersellen
2018–2019
2nd Overall EKZ CrossTour

1st Eschenbach
2nd Meilen

2nd Luzern
3rd National Championships
2019–2020
1st National Championships
2nd Madiswil
EKZ CrossTour

3rd Meilen

2020–2021
2nd National Championships
3rd Overall EKZ CrossTour

1st Baden
3rd Hittnau

2021–2022
2nd Meilen
2022–2023
2nd National Championships

=== Mountain bike ===
2011
2nd Team relay, UCI World Championships
2nd Team relay, UEC European Championships
2014
1st Cross-country, National Under-23 Championships
2016
1st Team relay, UEC European Championships
3rd Team relay, UCI World Championships
2018
1st Cross-country, UEC European Championships
2019
1st Overall Cape Epic (with Nino Schurter)
UCI XCO World Cup

1st Snowshoe

Swiss Bike Cup

1st Basel
3rd Andermatt
3rd Lugano
3rd Solothurn

Internazionali d'Italia Series

1st San Marino

UCI XCC World Cup

2nd Albstadt

2020
1st Overall Swiss Epic (with Nino Schurter)
3rd Cross-country, National Championships
2021
1st Cross-country, UEC European Championships
Swiss Bike Cup

1st Savognin
2nd Basel
3rd Gränichen

Internazionali d’Italia Series

1st Andora

2022
Internazionali d’Italia Series

1st San Zeno di Montagna

Ökk Bike Revolution

1st Huttwil

Swiss Bike Cup

2nd Basel

2023
UCI XCO World Cup

1st Leogang

Ökk Bike Revolution

1st Davos
2nd Engelberg

2nd Cross-country, UEC European Championships
National Championships

2nd Cross-country
2nd Short track

2024
1st Short track, National Championships
Ökk Bike Revolution

2nd Davos

2025
UCI XCO World Cup

4th Araxá I
