= Simon Zahner =

Swiss cyclist (born 1983)

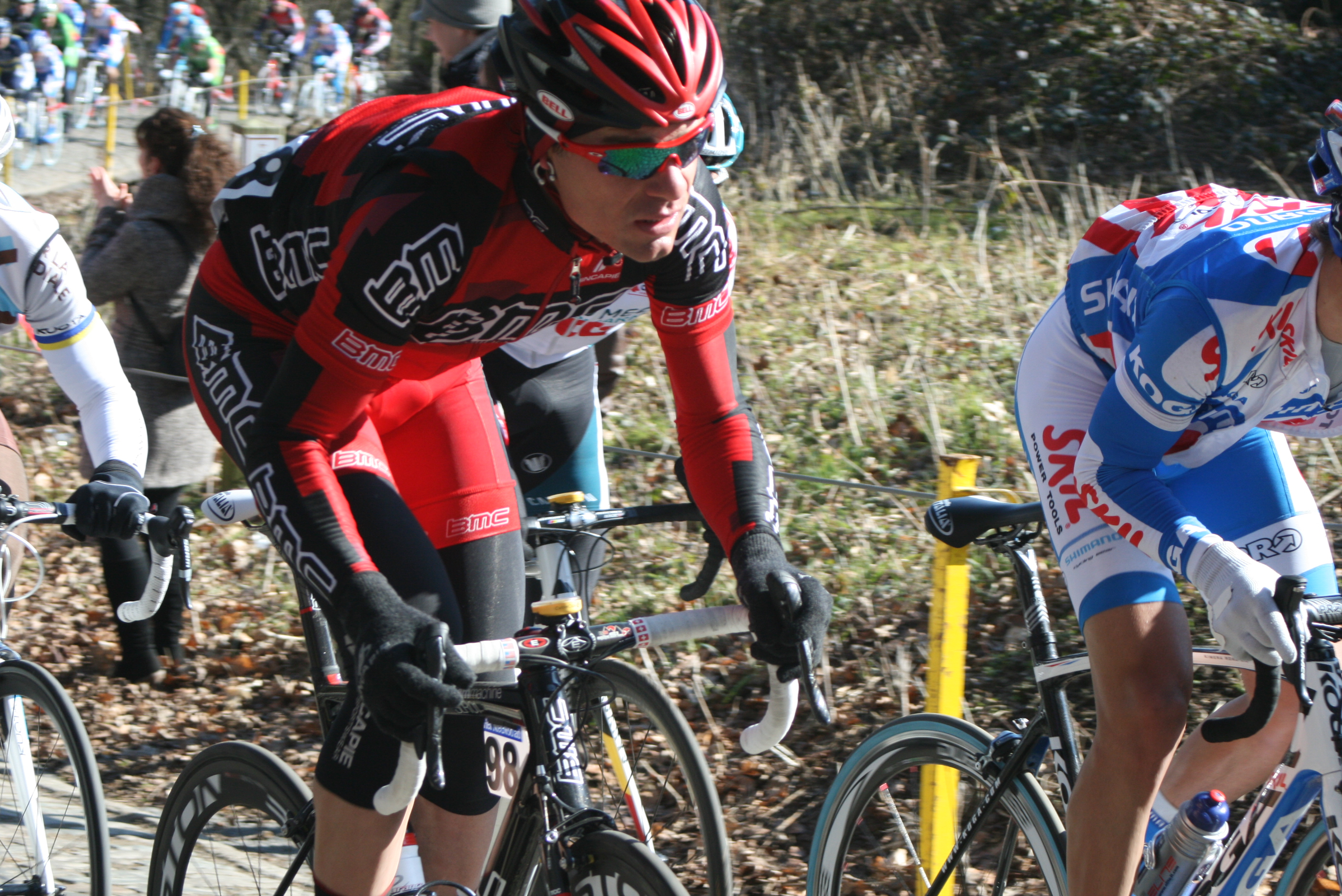

Personal information
- Born: 8 March 1983 (age 43) Bubikon, Switzerland
- Height: 1.81 m (5 ft 11 in)
- Weight: 73 kg (161 lb)

Cycling career
- Sport: Cycling
- Current team: Retired
- Disciplines: Road; Cyclo-cross
- Role: Rider

Amateur teams
- 2009: Bürgis Cycling
- 2012–2016: EKZ Racing

Professional teams
- 2003–2004: Saeco–Romer's
- 2010–2011: BMC Racing Team

Simon Zahner (born 8 March 1983 in Bubikon) is a Swiss former professional road and cyclo-cross cyclist.

== Major results ==
=== Road ===
2004
2nd Time trial, National Under-23 Road Championships
2005
2nd Time trial, National Under-23 Road Championships
2006
3rd Time trial, National Road Championships
2007
2nd Time trial, National Road Championships
2008
7th Overall Tour Alsace
2009
1st Overall Flèche du Sud

1st Stage 2

1st Overall Tour Alsace
8th Grand Prix of Aargau Canton
9th Overall Grand Prix Tell
2010
2nd Road race, National Road Championships
2013
1st Stage 4 Tour Alsace
2014
2nd Tour de Berne
4th Time trial, National Road Championships
2016
8th Tour de Berne

=== Cyclo-cross ===
2000–2001
2nd National Junior Championships
2002–2003
2nd National Under-23 Championships
2003–2004
1st National Under-23 Championships
2004–2005
UCI Under-23 World Cup

1st Nommay

2nd National Under-23 Championships
3rd UCI Under-23 World Championships
2005–2006
2nd National Championships
2006–2007
2nd National Championships
2nd Radquer Wetzikon
2007–2008
1st Cyclo-cross International Aigle
1st Rennaz-Noville
1st Int. Radquer Fehraltorf
2008–2009
1st Internationales Radquer Meilen
2nd National Championships
2009–2010
1st Flüuger-Quer
2011–2012
2nd National Championships
2nd Bussnang
3rd Internationales Radquer Steinmaur
10th UCI World Championships
2012–2013
1st Frankfurter Rad-Cross
2nd National Championships
2nd Internationales Radquer Steinmaur
2nd Bussnang
UCI World Cup

3rd Hoogerheide

3rd GP-5-Sterne-Region
3rd Flückiger Cross Madiswil
3rd Aigle
3rd Radcross Illnau
2013–2014
2nd GP-5-Sterne-Region
2nd GGEW City Cross Cup
2nd Int. Radquerfeldein GP Lambach
3rd National Championships
3rd Flückiger Cross Madiswil
2014–2015
EKZ CrossTour

2nd Eschenbach

2nd GGEW City Cross Cup
3rd Internationales Radquer Steinmaur
3rd Radcross Illnau
2015–2016
2nd Internationales Radquer Steinmaur
2nd Sion-Valais
EKZ CrossTour

3rd Hittnau

3rd GGEW City Cross Cup
3rd Radcross Illnau
2016–2017
2nd Internationales Radquer Steinmaur
3rd Nyon
9th UCI World Championships
2017–2018
2nd National Championships
EKZ CrossTour

2nd Bern
2nd Aigle

3rd Radcross Illnau
3rd Sion-Valais
2018–2019
2nd Internationales Radquer Steinmaur
3rd Flückiger Cross Madiswil
2019–2020
Toi Toi Cup

2nd Uničov
