= Roger Honegger =

Swiss cyclist

Personal information
- Born: 18 March 1964 (age 62) Stäfa, Switzerland

Cycling career
- Sport: Cycling
- Disciplines: Mountain bike Cyclo-cross
- Role: Rider
- Rider type: Cross-country
Medal record
Representing Switzerland
Mountain bike racing
European Championships
Gold medal – first place	1989 Anzère	Cross-country

Roger Honegger (born 18 March 1964) is a Swiss former professional cross-country mountain biker and cyclo-cross cyclist. He won the cross-country event at the 1989 European Mountain Bike Championships.

== Major results ==
=== Cyclo-cross ===
1987–1988
2nd UCI Amateur World Championships
1988–1989
3rd UCI Amateur World Championships
1989–1990
3rd National Championships
1990–1991
1st National Championships
7th UCI World Championships
1993–1994
3rd National Championships
1994–1995
3rd National Championships
5th UCI World Championships

=== Mountain bike ===
1989
1st European XCO Championships
1992
4th European XCO Championships
1993
6th UCI World XCO Championships
