= Erwin Lienhard =

Swiss cyclist (1957–2019)

Personal information
- Born: 16 January 1957 Steinmaur, Switzerland
- Died: 25 January 2019 (aged 62)

Cycling career
- Sport: Cycling
- Role: Rider

Erwin Lienhard (16 January 1957 – 25 January 2019) was a Swiss professional racing cyclist. He rode in one edition of the Tour de France, three editions of the Giro d'Italia and one edition of the Vuelta a España.

He was the father of racing cyclist Fabian Lienhard.
