= Wilhelm Paul Corssen =

German philologist (1820–1875)

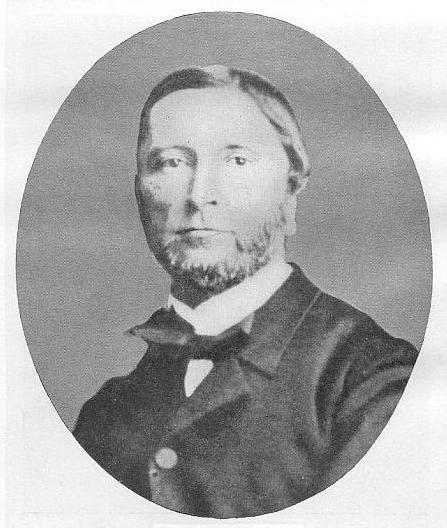
Paul Wilhelm Corssen

Wilhelm Paul Corssen (20 January 1820 – 18 June 1875) was a German philologist noted for his work on Latin and Etruscan topics.

== Biography ==
Corssen was born in Bremen and, after his merchant father moved to Schwedt in the Kingdom of Prussia, received his school education there. After spending some time at the Joachimsthal-Gymnasium in Berlin, where his interest in philological pursuits was awakened by the rector, Meinike, he proceeded to the university, and there came especially under the influence of August Böckh and Karl Lachmann.

His first important appearance in literature was as the author of Origines poesis romanae, by which he had obtained the prize offered by the philosophical or arts faculty of the university. In 1846 he was called from Stettin, where he had for nearly two years held a post in the gymnasium, to occupy the position of lecturer in the royal academy at Pforta (commonly called Schulpforta), and there he continued to labour for the next twenty years.

In 1854 he won a prize offered by the Royal Prussian Academy of Sciences for the best work on the pronunciation and accent of Latin, a treatise which at once took rank, on its publication under the title of Über Aussprache, Vocalismus, und Betonung der lateinischen Sprache (1858–1859), as one of the most erudite and masterly works in its department. This was followed in 1863 by his Kritische Beiträge zur lat. Formenlehre, which were supplemented in 1866 by Kritische Nachträge zur lat. Formenlehre.

In the discussion of the pronunciation of Latin he was naturally led to consider the various old Italian dialects, and the results of his investigations appeared in miscellaneous communications to Franz Felix Adalbert Kuhn's Zeitschrift für vergleichende Schriftforschung. Ill-health obliged him to give up his professorship at Pforta and return to Berlin in 1866, but it produced almost no diminution of his literary activity. In 1867 he published an elaborate archaeological study entitled the Alterthümer und Kunstdenkmale des Cistercienserklosters St Marien und der Landesschule Pforta, in which he gathered together all that can be discovered about the history of the Pforta academy, the so-called "German Eton", and in 1868–69 he brought out a new edition of his work on Latin pronunciation.

From a very early period he had been attracted to the special study of Etruscan remains, and had at various times given occasional expression to his opinions on individual points; but it was not till 1870 that he had the opportunity of visiting Italy and completing his equipment for a formal treatment of the whole subject by personal inspection of the monuments. In 1874 appeared the first volume of Über die Sprache der Etrusker, in which with great ingenuity and erudition he endeavoured to prove that the Etruscan language was cognate with that of the Romans. Before the second volume (published posthumously under the editorship of Ernst Kuhn) had received the last touches of his hand, he was cut off in 1875 by a comparatively early death in Groß-Lichterfelde.

== Influence on Friedrich Nietzsche ==
In Twilight of the Idols ("What I Owe to the Ancients") Friedrich Nietzsche, who was educated at the Schulpforta, pays homage to Corssen in discussion of his education and writing style:

My sense of style, for the epigram as a style, was awakened almost instantly when I came into contact with Sallust. I have not forgotten the surprise of my honored teacher, Corssen, when he had to give his worst Latin pupil the best grade—I had finished with one stroke.
