= Johan Jacobs =

Swiss bicycle racer

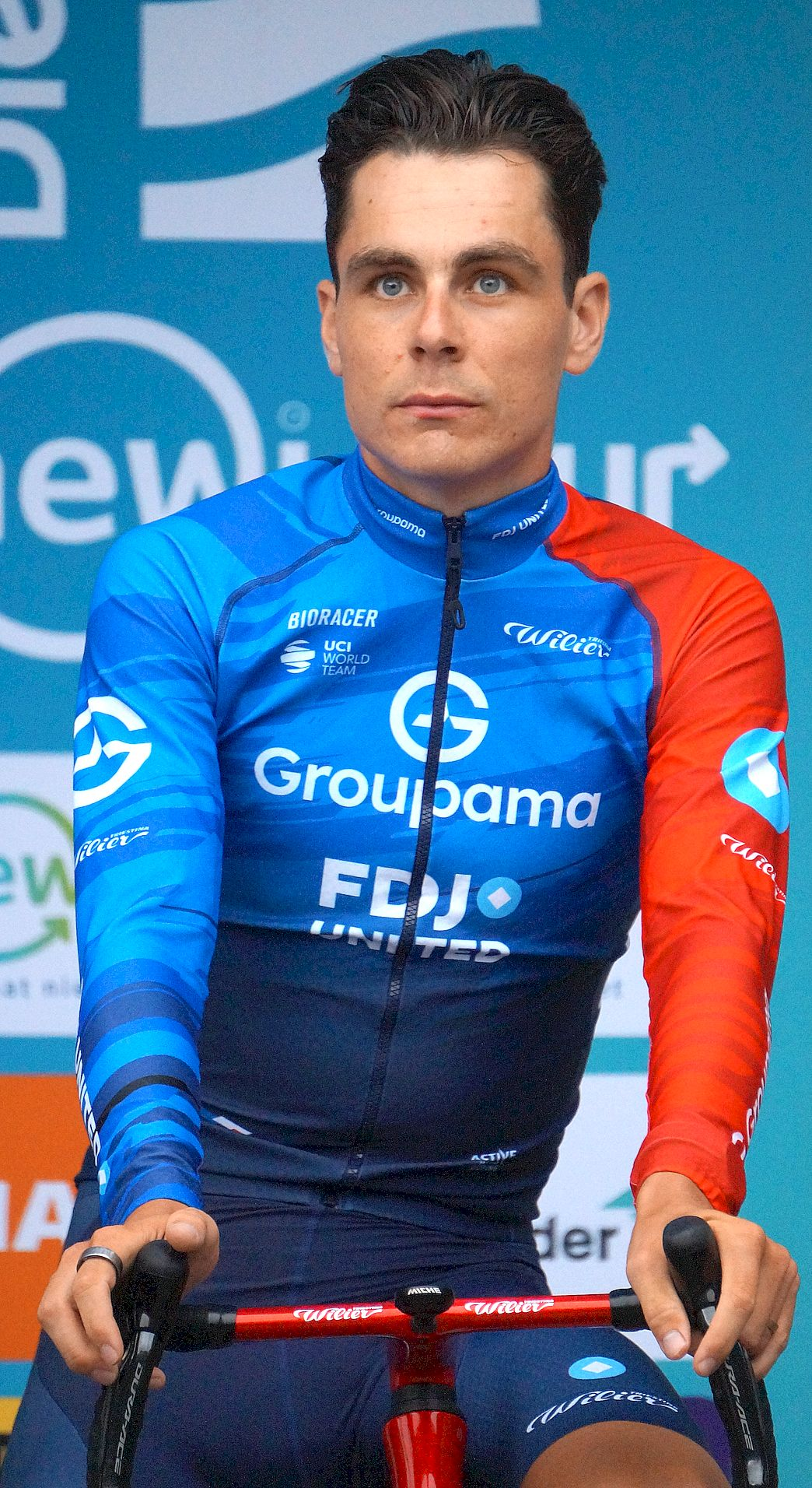
- Jacobs in 2026

Personal information
- Born: 1 March 1997 (age 29) Zürich, Switzerland
- Height: 1.92 m (6 ft 4 in)
- Weight: 72 kg (159 lb)

Cycling career
- Sport: Cycling
- Current team: Groupama–FDJ United
- Disciplines: Road; Cyclo-cross
- Role: Rider

Amateur teams
- 2015: Lares–Doltcini
- 2017: Balen BC
- 2019: Lotto–Soudal U23

Professional teams
- 2016: Marlux–Napoleon Games
- 2018: Pauwels Sauzen–Vastgoedservice
- 2020–2024: Movistar Team
- 2025–: Groupama–FDJ

Johan Jacobs (born 1 March 1997) is a Swiss road and cyclo-cross cyclist, who currently rides for UCI WorldTeam Groupama–FDJ United.

== Career ==
Jacobs early career started in cyclo-cross, winning multiple national titles and world cup races. In 2015 Jacobs won the eighth race in the Superprestige at Middelkerke series. This stopped Eli Iserbyt from winning every race in the series. At the Junior Koppenbergcross Jacobs attacked from the start and held off everyone for the entire race forcing Iserbyt and Thijs Wolsink to work together.

Jacobs elected not to ride cyclo-cross race in his final year as an Under-23 instead wanting to focus on road cycling, this put him into the spotlight for a contract with Lotto–Soudal U23. He was the only rider able to follow the winning move by Tom Pidcock in the Paris–Roubaix Espoirs which earned him a second place. These efforts caught the eye of Movistar Team's manager Eusebio Unzué and led to getting a two-year contract with the UCI WorldTour team in 2020.

While riding the 2021 Vuelta a España Jacobs crashed during stage 9. He went through a guardrail resulting in a broken shoulder, rib and a collapsed lung. He did not race again in the 2021 season.

Movistar Team extended Jacobs contract by one year till the end of 2024. Jacobs elected to not race cyclo-cross over the 2023 winter so that he would have more time to prepare for the 2024 road season.

== Major results ==
=== Cyclo-cross ===
2013–2014
1st National Junior Championships
2nd Overall Junior Superprestige

1st Middelkerke
2nd Hoogstraten

2014–2015
1st National Junior Championships
Junior BPost Bank Trophy

1st Koppenbergcross
1st GP Sven Nys
1st Krawatencross

2nd Overall UCI Junior World Cup

1st Namur
3rd Valkenburg

2nd Overall Junior Superprestige

1st Middelkerke
2nd Zonhoven
2nd Ruddervoorde
2nd Hoogstraten
3rd Gieten
3rd Diegem

3rd UEC European Junior Championships
2015–2016
3rd National Under-23 Championships
2016–2017
1st National Under-23 Championships
2017–2018
2nd National Under-23 Championships
National Trophy Series

3rd Ipswich

=== Road ===
2019
1st Stage 2 (TTT) Tour de l'Avenir
2nd Paris–Roubaix Espoirs
7th Ronde van Vlaanderen Beloften
8th Sundvolden GP
2020
4th Road race, National Championships
2021
3rd Road race, National Championships

==== Grand Tour general classification results timeline ====
Grand Tour	2021
Giro d'Italia	—
Tour de France	—
Vuelta a España	DNF

Legend
—	Did not compete
DNF	Did not finish
