= Beat Wabel =

Swiss cyclist

Personal information
- Born: 23 May 1967 (age 59) Wetzikon, Switzerland
- Height: 1.82 m (6 ft 0 in)
- Weight: 72 kg (159 lb)

Cycling career
- Sport: Cycling
- Current team: Retired
- Disciplines: Cyclo-cross; Mountain biking; Road
- Role: Rider

Professional teams
- 1991–1992: Bleiker
- 1993–1996: Titan
- 1997–1998: Proflex
Medal record
Representing Switzerland
Men's cyclo-cross
World Championships
Gold medal – first place	1985 Münich	Junior Race
Bronze medal – third place	1995 Eschenbach	Elite race

Beat Wabel (born 23 May 1967) is a Swiss former professional cyclist. He competed in the men's cross-country mountain biking event at the 1996 Summer Olympics.

Professional from 1991 to 2005, he won the UCI Junior Cyclo-cross World Championships in 1985 and the Swiss National Cyclo-cross Championships five times. He also won a bronze medal in the elite race at the 1995 UCI World Championships.

He is the brother of Yvonne Schnorf-Wabel.

== Major results ==
=== Cyclo-cross ===
1984–1985
1st UCI World Junior Championships
1990–1991
Superprestige

1st Wetzikon

1991–1992
1st National Championships
Superprestige

3rd Wetzikon

4th UCI World Championships
1992–1993
Superprestige

1st Eschenbach

7th UCI World Championships
1993–1994
Superprestige

3rd Diegem
3rd Wetzikon
3rd Plzeň

1994–1995
2nd National Championships
Superprestige

2nd Wetzikon

3rd UCI World Championships
1995–1996
2nd National Championships
3rd Overall UCI World Cup

3rd Variano di Basiliano

1996–1997
1st Hittnau
3rd National Championships
1997–1998
1st National Championships
1st Hittnau
UCI World Cup

3rd Eschenbach

1998–1999
1st Hittnau
2nd National Championships
UCI World Cup

3rd Eschenbach

1999–2000
1st National Championships
1st Igorre
1st Dagmersellen
1st Hittnau
3rd Steinmaur
2000–2001
1st National Championships
2nd Igorre
2001–2002
1st Hittnau
2nd Dagmersellen
3rd National Championships
3rd Steinmaur
2002–2003
1st National Championships
2nd Dagmersellen
2nd Hittnau

=== MTB ===
1993
UCI XCO World Cup

1st Vail

1997
2nd National XCO Championships
3rd European XCO Championships
1998
3rd National XCO Championships
