= Marcel Wildhaber =

Swiss cyclist (born 1985)

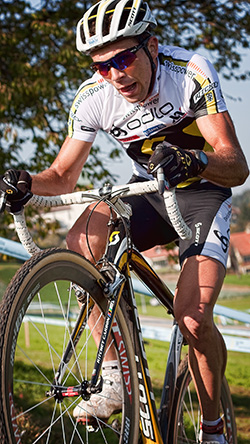
- Wildhaber in 2011

Personal information
- Born: 17 May 1985 (age 41) Wangen, Switzerland
- Height: 1.72 m (5 ft 8 in)
- Weight: 65 kg (143 lb)

Cycling career
- Sport: Cycling
- Disciplines: Cyclo-cross; Mountain biking
- Role: Rider

Professional team
- 2010–2019: Scott–Swisspower MTB Racing

Marcel Wildhaber (born 17 May 1985) is a Swiss former professional cyclo-cross cyclist and cross-country mountain biker.

== Major results ==
=== Cyclo-cross ===
2007–2008
3rd Aigle
3rd Uster
2009–2010
1st Aigle
3rd GP Wetzikon
2010–2011
1st Steinmaur
3rd Bussnang
2011–2012
1st Steinmaur
1st Hittnau
3rd Frenkendorf
3rd Bussnang
2012–2013
1st Flückiger Cross Madiswil
2nd Aigle
2nd GP-5-Sterne-Region
3rd Frenkendorf
3rd Bussnang
2013–2014
1st GP-5-Sterne-Region
2nd National Championships
2nd Sion-Valais
3rd Sion-Valais
2014–2015
1st Schlosscross
National Trophy Series

1st Milton Keynes

2nd Flückiger Cross Madiswil
2015–2016
EKZ CrossTour

1st Eschenbach

2nd Illnau
2016–2017
1st Overall EKZ CrossTour

1st Eschenbach

1st QianSen Trophy Fengtai Station
1st Steinmaur
2nd Flückiger Cross Madiswil
3rd GP Luzern Pfaffnau
2017–2018
1st Overall EKZ CrossTour

1st Bern
1st Aigle

Qiansen Trophy

2nd Yanqing
2nd Fengtai Changxindian

2nd Nyon
2nd Sion-Valais
2nd Illnau
2018–2019
2nd Flückiger Cross Madiswil
2nd Brugherio
2019–2020
2nd Illnau
Toi Toi Cup

3rd Slaný
3rd Mladá Boleslav

=== MTB ===
2013
1st National XCE Championships
2015
1st National XCE Championships
3rd European XCE Championships
