= 2020 UCI Cyclo-cross World Championships =

Cyclo-cross championship

- Venue: Dübendorf, Switzerland
- Date: 31 to 2 February 2020
- Coordinates: 47°25′N 8°37′E
- Events: 6

The 2020 UCI Cyclo-cross World Championships were held from 1 to 2 February 2020 in Dübendorf, Switzerland.

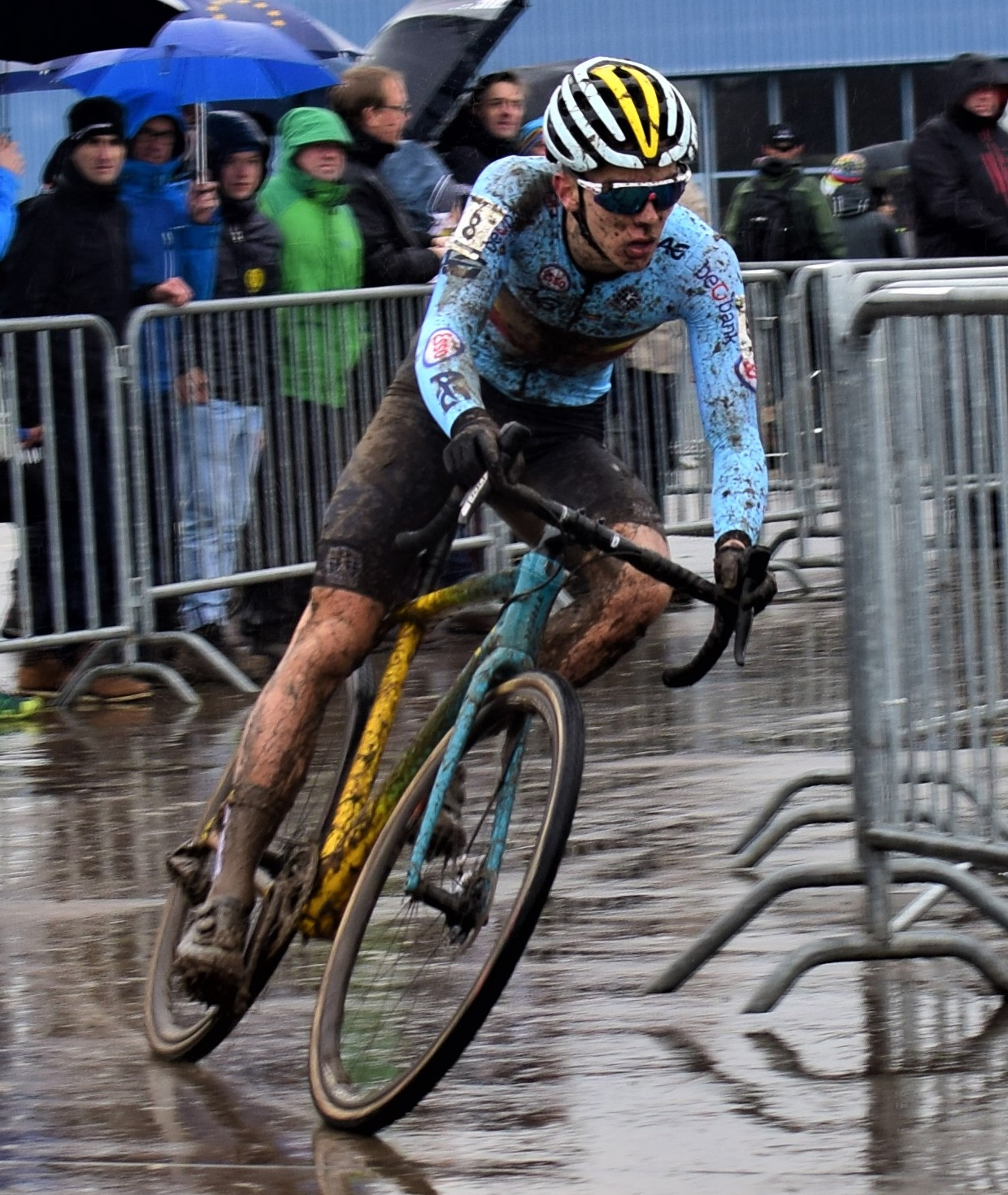
Thibau Nys during the men's junior race

== Schedule ==
All times are local (UTC+1).

Date	Time	Event
1 February	11:00	Women's junior
1 February	13:00	Men's under-23
1 February	15:00	Women's elite
2 February	11:00	Men's junior
2 February	13:00	Women's under-23
2 February	14:30	Men's elite

== Medal summary ==
=== Medalists ===
Event	Gold		Silver		Bronze	
Men's events
Men's elite race	Mathieu van der Poel; Netherlands	1h 8' 52"	Tom Pidcock; Great Britain	+1' 20"	Toon Aerts; Belgium	+1' 45"
Men's under-23 race	Ryan Kamp; Netherlands	47' 53"	Kevin Kuhn; Switzerland	+36"	Mees Hendrikx; Netherlands	+52"
Men's junior race	Thibau Nys; Belgium	38' 50"	Lennert Belmans; Belgium	+31"	Emiel Verstrynge; Belgium	+38"
Women's events
Women's elite race	Ceylin del Carmen Alvarado; Netherlands	45' 20"	Annemarie Worst; Netherlands	+1"	Lucinda Brand; Netherlands	+10"
Women's under-23 race	Marion Norbert-Riberolle; France	48' 31"	Kata Blanka Vas; Hungary	+27"	Anna Kay; Great Britain	+40"
Women's junior race	Shirin van Anrooij; Netherlands	38'34"	Puck Pieterse; Netherlands	+53"	Madigan Munro; United States	+1' 18"

=== Medals table ===
* Host nation (Switzerland)

Rank	Nation	Gold	Silver	Bronze	Total
1	Netherlands (NED)	4	2	2	8
2	Belgium (BEL)	1	1	2	4
3	France (FRA)	1	0	0	1
4	Great Britain (GBR)	0	1	1	2
5	Hungary (HUN)	0	1	0	1
5	Switzerland (SUI)*	0	1	0	1
7	United States (USA)	0	0	1	1
Totals (7 entries)		6	6	6	18
