= Erwin Jaisli =

Swiss cyclist (1937–2022)

Personal information
- Born: 28 January 1937 Zürich, Switzerland
- Died: 15 January 2022 (aged 84)

Cycling career
- Sport: Cycling

Erwin Jaisli (28 January 1937 – 15 January 2022) was a Swiss cyclist. He competed at the 1960 Summer Olympics and the 1964 Summer Olympics.
