= Emil Jäger =

Emil Jaeger (aka Emil Jäger) (1892 – 1947) was a professional soldier in the Wehrmacht, attaining the rank of Oberst. In 1933 he joined the Nazi Party in Austria and later authored a brochure about the actions of local SA Brigade 6 („SA-Brigade Jäger“). In April 1944 he was appointed as the Territorial Commander of the Island of Corfu and is probably best known for attempting to prevent the deportation of the island's Jewish population to Auschwitz.

In the spring of 1944, the German Commanders began to deport the Jews of occupied Greece to concentration camps throughout the German Reich. One of the communities which was to be deported was the Jewish community on the island of Corfu. On April 25, 1944, Wehrmacht intelligence “reported no military or political objections to the planned deportation of the island’s Jews”.

Upon hearing this, Jaeger protested, arguing that the deportation of the Jews would “cause unrest among the Greek population”. This argument did not sway his superiors, who ordered the operation to continue.

Despite being told of this decision, Jaeger continued to protest it. He presented multiple arguments. First, there was no possible way to transport the Jews off of the island. Second, Jaeger argued that the Italians on Corfu presented a greater threat than the Jews, “against whom incidentally there have never been any complaints”. Third, he noted that the Greeks on the island supported the Jews. Fourth, a Red Cross ship was in the harbor delivering aid. This ship could potentially witness deportations and fuel ‘atrocities propaganda’, fueling the Allies' propaganda campaign.

The most shocking defense, however, was Jaeger's use of a moral argument for not deporting the Jews. Jaeger argued that the operation would lead to “a loss of ethical prestige in the eyes of the population”, an argument which, according to scholar Mark Mazower, was almost unique among German officers during this time period.

Unfortunately, Jaeger’s attempt was in vain. The Jews were rounded up on June 8, and eventually were deported to Auschwitz and other concentration camps.

After the German withdrawal from the island in October 1944 Oberst Jaeger is next recorded as commanding Festungs-Bataillon 1017 in the Balkans in February 1945. It is unclear when he became a prisoner of war but on 26 March 1946 he was tried in Tirana, Albania and sentenced to death, being executed mid-1947.
