= 2019–20 UCI Cyclo-cross World Cup =

Bicycle racing competition

Details
- Location: Belgium; Czech Republic; France; Netherlands; Switzerland; United States
- Races: 9

Champions
- Male individual champion: Toon Aerts (BEL) (Telenet–Baloise Lions)
- Female individual champion: Annemarie Worst (NED) (777)

The 2019–20 Telenet UCI Cyclo-cross World Cup was a season long cyclo-cross competition, organised by the Union Cycliste Internationale (UCI). The UCI Cyclo-cross World Cup took place between 14 September 2019 and 26 January 2020, over a total of nine events. The defending champions were Toon Aerts in the men's competition and Marianne Vos in the women's competition.

== Points distribution ==
Points were awarded to all eligible riders at each race. The top ten finishers received points according to the following table:

Points awarded
Position	1	2	3	4	5	6	7	8	9	10
Elite riders (Note: Women's under-23 riders were awarded points on the elite scale, as all women competed within the same race. Two jerseys were awarded; one for the leading elite woman and one for the leading under-23 woman.)	80	70	65	60	55	50	48	46	44	42
U23/Junior riders	60	50	45	40	35	30	28	26	24	22

- Elite riders finishing in positions 11 to 50 also received points, going down from 40 points for 11th place by one point per place to 1 point for 50th place.
- For the age group riders (excluding under-23 women), those finishing in positions 11 to 30 also received points, going down from 20 points for 11th place by one point per place to 1 point for 30th place. As well as this, only the top four scores for each rider count towards the World Cup standings.

== Events ==
In comparison to the previous season, the race in Pontchâteau was replaced by the Cyclo-cross de Nommay and the two American races were swapped around.

Date	Race	Location	Winners			
Date	Race	Location	Elite men	Elite women	Under-23 men	Junior men
14 September	Jingle Cross	Iowa City, United States	Eli Iserbyt (BEL)	Maghalie Rochette (CAN)	No under-23 or junior race	
22 September	World Cup Waterloo	Waterloo, United States	Eli Iserbyt (BEL)	Kateřina Nash (CZE)	No under-23 or junior race	
20 October	Cyclo-cross Bern	Bern, Switzerland	Eli Iserbyt (BEL)	Annemarie Worst (NED)	Kevin Kuhn (SUI)	Thibau Nys (BEL)
16 November	Cyklokros Tábor	Tábor, Czech Republic	Mathieu van der Poel (NED)	Annemarie Worst (NED)	Thomas Mein (GBR)	Thibau Nys (BEL)
24 November	Duinencross Koksijde	Koksijde, Belgium	Mathieu van der Poel (NED)	Ceylin del Carmen Alvarado (NED)	Niels Vandeputte (BEL)	Thibau Nys (BEL)
22 December	Citadelcross	Namur, Belgium	Mathieu van der Poel (NED)	Lucinda Brand (NED)	Kevin Kuhn (SUI)	Thibau Nys (BEL)
26 December	Grand Prix Erik De Vlaeminck	Heusden-Zolder, Belgium	Mathieu van der Poel (NED)	Lucinda Brand (NED)	Kevin Kuhn (SUI)	Thibau Nys (BEL)
19 January	Cyclo-cross de Nommay	Nommay, France	Eli Iserbyt (BEL)	Annemarie Worst (NED)	Ryan Kamp (NED)	Thibau Nys (BEL)
26 January	Grand Prix Adri van der Poel	Hoogerheide, Netherlands	Mathieu van der Poel (NED)	Lucinda Brand (NED)	Ryan Kamp (NED)	Dario Lillo (SUI)

== Points standings ==
=== Elite men ===
Pos.	Rider	JIN (United States)	WAT (United States)	BER (Switzerland)	TAB (Czech Republic)	KOK (Belgium)	NAM (Belgium)	ZOL (Belgium)	NOM (France)	HOO (Netherlands)	Points
1	Toon Aerts (BEL)	2	2	2	5	3	2	14	2	2	577
2	Eli Iserbyt (BEL)	1	1	1	2	13	Ret	13	1	3	531
3	Michael Vanthourenhout (BEL)	7	3	3	4	8	7	4	11	4	492
4	Laurens Sweeck (BEL)	5	16	8	9	2	9	2	3	9	473
5	Lars van der Haar (NED)	6	13	6	3	4	6	9	4	6	467
6	Quinten Hermans (BEL)	9	6	4	7	5	15	3	7	13	444
7	Corne van Kessel (NED)	Ret	5	5	6	6	3	6	6	10	417
8	Mathieu van der Poel (NED)				1	1	1	1		1	400
9	Gianni Vermeersch (BEL)	4	4	24	12	20	11	5	8	16	393
10	Joris Nieuwenhuis (NED)	26	8	9	11	21	14	8	16	14	340

=== Elite women ===
Pos.	Rider	JIN (United States)	WAT (United States)	BER (Switzerland)	TAB (Czech Republic)	KOK (Belgium)	NAM (Belgium)	ZOL (Belgium)	NOM (France)	HOO (Netherlands)	Points
1	Annemarie Worst (NED)			1	1	5	3	3	1	2	495
2	Ceylin del Carmen Alvarado (NED)			2	2	1	2	2	2	6	480
3	Kateřina Nash (CZE)	2	1	7	18	14	5	15	12	19	430
4	Inge van der Heijden (NED)	4	21	21	12	4	14	5	18	9	388
5	Katie Compton (USA)	22	19	6	13	11	7	12	3	15	377
6	Maghalie Rochette (CAN)	1	5	11	16		9	14	11	8	375
7	Lucinda Brand (NED)				4	2	1	1		1	370
8	Anna Kay (GBR)	12	14	3	7	12	30	19	19	18	346
9	Caroline Mani (FRA)	8	6	22	14	21	17	27	7	14	335
10	Manon Bakker (NED)	13	8	13	17	13	12	33	5	24	333
