= Ernst Kuhn =

German Indologist and Indo-Europeanist

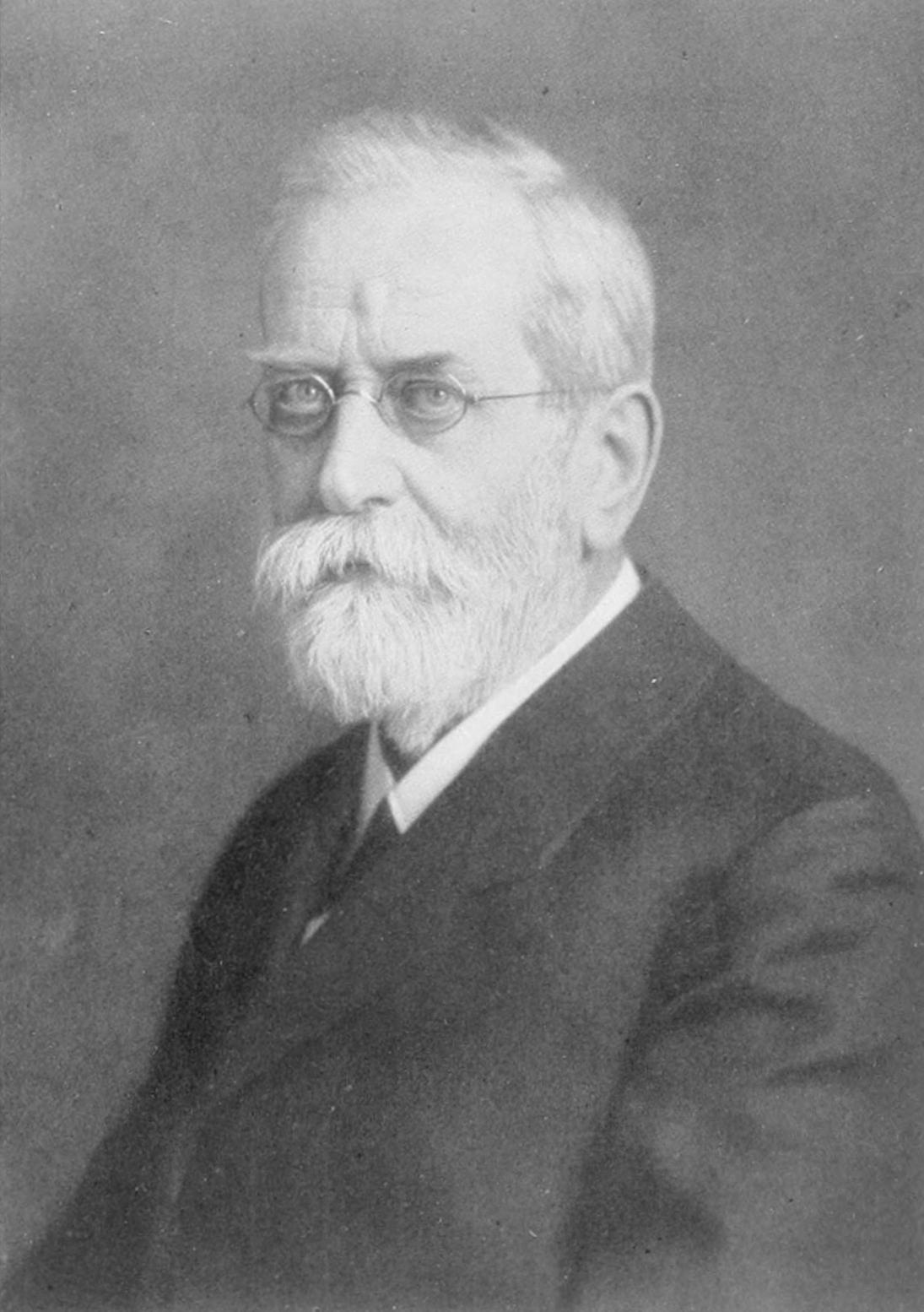

Ernst Wilhelm Adalbert Kuhn (7 February 1846, in Berlin – 21 August 1920, in Munich) was a German Indologist and Indo-Europeanist. He was the son of philologist Adalbert Kuhn.

He studied at the Friedrich Wilhelm University of Berlin and the University of Tübingen, receiving his doctorate in 1869 with a dissertation-thesis on Kaccāyana, the grammarian, Kaccâyanappakaraṇae specimen. In 1871, he obtained his habilitation for Sanskrit and comparative grammar at the University of Halle, and during the following year relocated to Leipzig University as a lecturer. In 1875, he became a full professor at Heidelberg University, and from 1877 to 1917 served as a professor of Aryan philology and comparative Indo-European linguistics at the Ludwig-Maximilians-Universität München.

From 1873, he worked on the Zeitschrift für vergleichende Sprachforschung, a journal founded by his father, and since 1892 was an editor of Orientalische Bibliographie, a publication founded by August Müller in 1887. In 1883, he became a member of the Bavarian Academy of Sciences.

== Selected works ==
- Ueber die sprache der Etrusker (with Wilhelm Paul Corssen; 2 volumes, 1874–75) – On the language of the Etruscans.
- Beiträge zur Pali-grammatik, 1875 – Contributions to Pali grammar / considered to be his best work.
- Mythologische studien von Adalbert Kuhn (1886, as editor) – Mythological studies of Adalbert Kuhn.
- Barlaam und Joasaph; eine bibliographisch-literargeschichtliche Studie, 1894 – Barlaam and Josaphat; a bibliographical-literary-historical study / In this work Kuhn pointed out the Buddhist influence on Christian legends.
- Grundriss der iranischen philologie (as editor; main author Wilhelm Geiger) – Outline of Iranian philology.
