= Fritz Hartmann =

Swiss footballer

Personal information
- Full name: Fritz Hartmann
- Position: Midfielder

Senior career*
Years	Team	Apps	(Gls)
1945–1949	Nordstern Basel	126	(5)
1950–1952	FC Basel	23	(0)
1952–1956	Nordstern Basel	13	(0)
- * Club domestic league appearances and goals

Fritz Hartmann is a Swiss former footballer who played as a midfielder during the 1940s and 1950s.

Hartmann played at least five years for Nordstern Basel and he joined FC Basel's first team in their 1950–51 season under player-coach Ernst Hufschmid. After four test games Hartmann played his domestic league debut for the club in the away game on 3 September 1950 as Basel played 1–1 against Biel-Bienne. That season he played in 23 of the 26 league matches. In the following season he only played in four test games.

In his two seasons with FC Basel, Hartmann played a total of 38 games for the team, but without scoring a goal. 23 of these games were in the Nationalliga A, three in the Swiss Cup and 12 were friendly games.

Following his time with FC Basel Hartmann returned to play for Nordstern Basel.

== Sources ==
- Die ersten 125 Jahre. Publisher: Josef Zindel im Friedrich Reinhardt Verlag, Basel. ISBN 978-3-7245-2305-5
- Verein "Basler Fussballarchiv" Homepage
