= Lise-Marie Henzelin =

Swiss cyclist

Personal information
- Born: 8 November 1991 (age 34)

Cycling career
- Sport: Cycling
- Discipline: Cyclo-cross
- Role: Rider

Lise-Marie Henzelin (born 8 November 1991) is a Swiss female cyclo-cross cyclist. She represented her nation in the women's elite event at the 2016 UCI Cyclo-cross World Championships in Heusden-Zolder.
