= Charles Martinet (cyclist) =

Swiss cyclist

Personal information
- Born: 27 April 1894
- Died: 8 October 1976 (aged 82)

Cycling career
- Sport: Cycling
- Discipline: Road
- Role: Rider

Charles Martinet (27 April 1894 – 8 October 1976) was a Swiss racing cyclist. He rode in the 1925 Tour de France.
