= Julien Taramarcaz =

Swiss cyclist

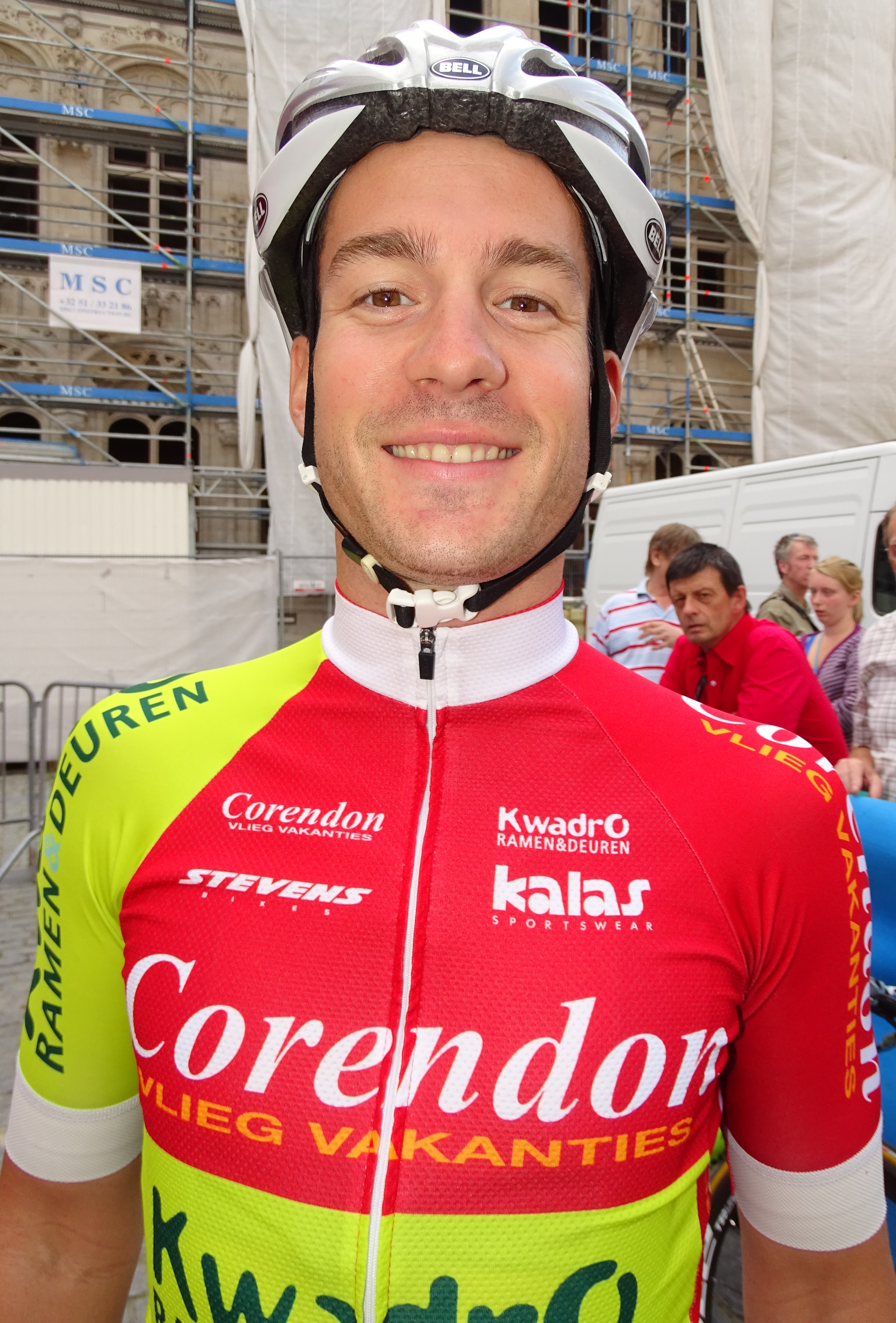

Personal information
- Full name: Julien Taramarcaz
- Born: 12 November 1987 (age 38) Fully, Switzerland
- Height: 1.72 m (5 ft 8 in)
- Weight: 64 kg (141 lb)

Cycling career
- Sport: Cycling
- Current team: Retired
- Disciplines: Cyclo-cross; Road
- Role: Rider

Professional teams
- 2007: Atlas–Romer's Hausbäckerei
- 2011–2013: BMC Mountainbike Racing
- 2013: BMC Racing Team (stagiaire)
- 2014–2017: Kwadro–Stannah

Julien Taramarcaz (born 12 November 1987) is a former professional cyclo-cross and road cyclist from Switzerland.

== Major results ==
=== Cyclo-cross ===
2003–2004
2nd National Junior Championships
2004–2005
1st UEC European Junior Championships
1st National Junior Championships
2nd UCI Junior World Championships
3rd Overall UCI Junior World Cup

1st Wetzikon

2005–2006
3rd National Under-23 Championships
2006–2007
3rd National Under-23 Championships
2007–2008
Under-23 Superprestige

1st Veghel-Eerde

2nd National Under-23 Championships
2008–2009
1st National Under-23 Championships
2010–2011
3rd National Championships
3rd GP 5 Sterne Region
3rd Internationales Radquer Dagmersellen
2011–2012
1st National Championships
1st Rennaz
2012–2013
1st National Championships
1st Radcross Illnau
2nd Kasteelcross Zonnebeke
6th UCI World Championships
2013–2014
1st Cyclo-cross International Sion-Valais
2014–2015
1st National Championships
3rd Cyclo-cross International de Nommay
2015–2016
2nd National Championships
3rd Kermiscross
2016–2017
1st National Championships
1st Cyclocross International Sion-Valais

=== Road ===
2005
National Junior Road Championships

1st Road race
2nd Time trial

2014
3rd Ronde van Vlaams-Brabant
