= Dieter Runkel =

Swiss cyclist

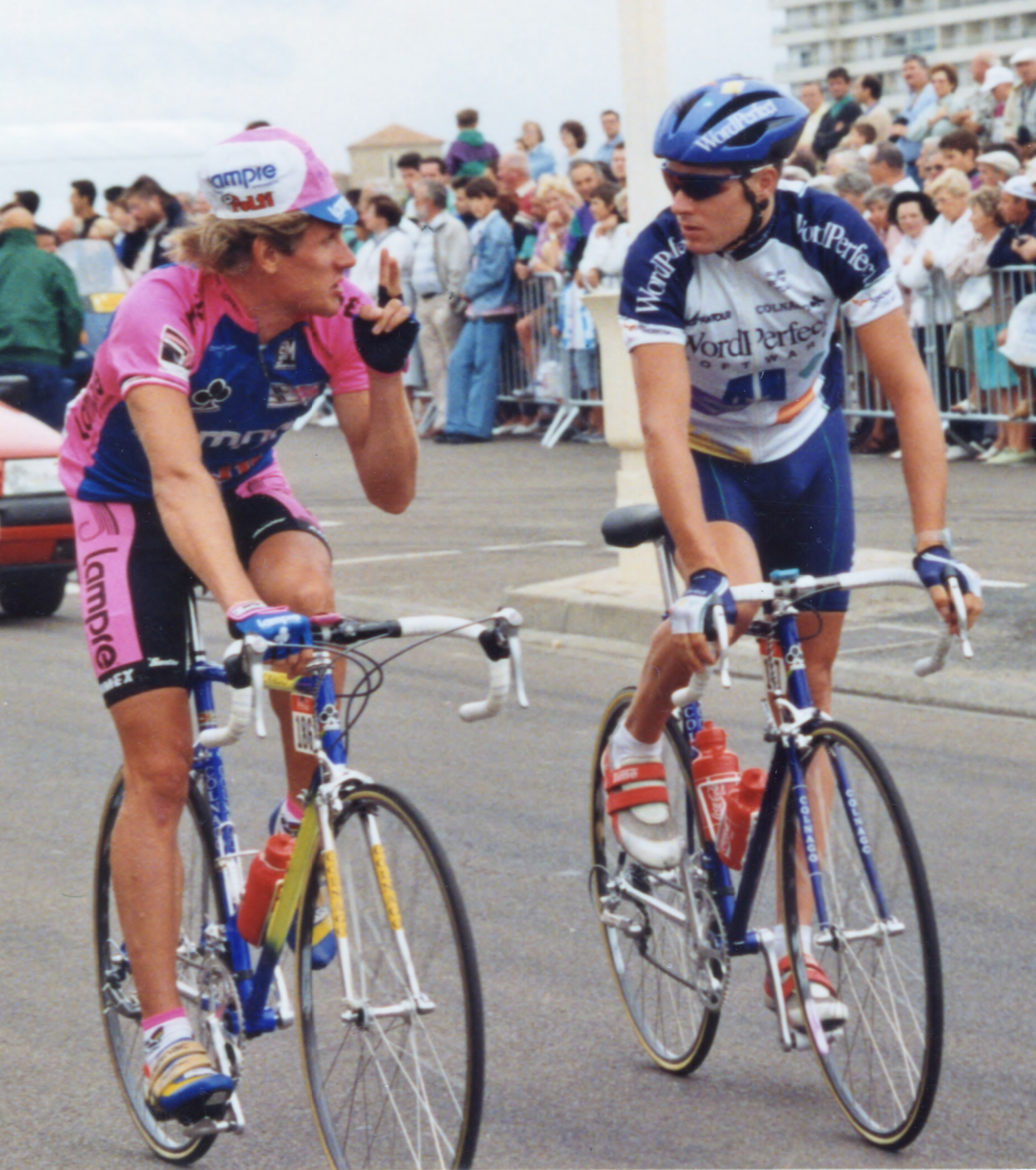
- Dieter Runkel (right) during the 1993 Tour de France

Personal information
- Born: 21 December 1966 (age 59) Obergösgen, Switzerland

Cycling career
- Sport: Cycling
- Current team: Retired
- Disciplines: Cyclo-cross; Road
- Role: Rider

Professional teams
- 1993–1994: WordPerfect–Colnago–Decca
- 1995: Gerber
- 1995: Scott
- 1995–1997: Saeco–Wheeler
Medal record
Representing Switzerland
Men's cyclo-cross
World Championships
Gold medal – first place	1995 Eschenbach	Elite race

Dieter Runkel (born 21 December 1966 in Obergösgen) is a Swiss former cyclist.

Specializing in cyclo-cross, he won the UCI World Cyclo-cross Championships in 1995. He also rode in the 1993 Tour de France, finishing in 131st position.

== Major results ==
=== Cyclo-cross ===
1987
3rd National Championships
1992
1st National Championships
1995
1st UCI World Championships
1st National Championships
1996
1st National Championships
1997
2nd National Championships
1998
2nd National Championships
1999
3rd National Championships

=== Road ===
1992
1st Overall Grand Prix Guillaume Tell

1st Stage 3
