= Christian Heule =

Swiss cyclist

Personal information
- Born: 2 April 1975 (age 51) Sankt Gallen, Switzerland

Cycling career
- Sport: Cycling
- Discipline: Racing
- Role: Rider

Amateur team
- ?: VC Uznach

Professional teams
- 1998-2000: Ericsson Villiger
- 2000-2002: Post Swiss Team
- 2002: Team Cologne
- 2003-2005: Macandina Kewa-wheel-VC Gippingen
- 2005-2007: Stevens Racing
- 2008-?: Rendementhypo Cycling Team

Christian Heule (born 2 April 1975 in Sankt Gallen) is a Swiss professional racing cyclist.

His sporting career began with VC Uznach. He began his professional career in 1998 with the Ericsson Villiger cycling team. After two years he joined the Post Swiss Team and after a further two years he switched to Team Cologne. In 2003 he went to Macandina Kewa-wheel-VC Gippingen where he won a road stage of the Tour of Slovenia. Between 2005 and 2007, Heule rode for the German Stevens Racing team. In 2008, he became the leader of the Belgian Rendementhypo Cycling Team.

Heule is relatively unknown in his home country, but quite popular in the Campine in Belgium.

== Career highlights ==
1997
2nd in National Championship, Cyclo-cross, U23, Switzerland, Liestal (SUI)

1998
3rd in Steinmaur, Cyclo-cross (SUI)

2000
1st in Frankfurt/Main, Cyclo-cross (GER)
2nd in GP Wielerrevue (NED)
2nd in Leimentalrundfahrt, Oberwil (SUI)
2nd in Oberschlierbach, Cyclo-cross (a) (AUT)
2nd in Fond-de-Gras, Cyclo-cross (LUX)
3rd in Hombrechtikon, Cyclo-cross (SUI)
3rd in Oberschlierbach, Cyclo-cross (b) (AUT)

2001
2nd in Tour du Canton de Genève (SUI)
2nd in Fond-de-Gras, Cyclo-cross (LUX)

2002
1st in Ruggell (SUI)
1st in Tour du Canton de Genève (SUI)
1st in Ottikon, Cyclo-cross (SUI)
1st in Fond-de-Gras, Cyclo-cross (LUX)
3rd in Uzwil, Criterium (GER)
3rd in Bützberg, Cyclo-cross (SUI)

2003
1st in Stage 4 Tour de Slovénie, Kranj (SLO)
1st in GP de la Commune de Leudelange (LUX)
1st in Einsiedeln (SUI)
2nd in Lyss (b) (SUI)
3rd in Russikon, Cyclo-cross (SUI)
3rd in Meilen, Cyclo-cross (SUI)

2004
1st in Uster, Cyclo-cross, Uster (SUI)
1st in National Championship, Cyclo-cross, Elite, Switzerland (SUI)
1st in Stage 3 Tour of Japan, Shuz (JPN)
1st in Hombrechtikon, Cyclo-cross (SUI)
2nd in General Classification Tour of Japan (JPN)

2005
1st in Weitenau (GER)
1st in Schulteiss-Cup, Cyclo-cross (GER)
1st in Hittnau, Cyclo-cross (SUI)
1st in Rüti, Cyclo-cross (SUI)
2nd in National Championship, Cyclo-cross, Elite, Switzerland, Meilen (SUI)
2nd in Hamburg, Cyclo-cross (GER)
2nd in Nommay, Cyclo-cross (FRA)
3rd in Aalter, Cyclo-cross (BEL)
3rd in Steinmaur, Cyclo-cross (SUI)

2006
1st in National Championship, Cyclo-cross, Elite, Switzerland, Meilen (SUI)
1st in Hamburg, Cyclo-cross, Hamburg (GER)
1st in Hamburg, Cyclo-cross (b), Hamburg (GER)
1st in Schulteiss-Cup, Cyclo-cross (GER)
1st in Rüti, Cyclo-cross (SUI)
1st in Magstadt, Cyclo-cross (GER)
1st in Schmerikon, Cyclo-cross (SUI)
1st in Hittnau, Cyclo-cross (SUI)
1st in Asteasu, Cyclo-cross (ESP)
1st in Wetzikon, Cyclo-cross (SUI)
2nd in Fehraltorf, Cyclo-cross (SUI)

2007
1st in National Championship, Cyclo-cross, Elite, Switzerland, Steinmaur (SUI)
1st in Redmond, Cyclo-cross (USA)
1st in Lakewood, Cyclo-cross (USA)
1st in Magstadt, Cyclo-cross (GER)
1st in Hittnau, Cyclo-cross (SUI)
1st in Meilen, Cyclo-cross (SUI)
1st in Schmerikon, Cyclo-cross (SUI)
2nd in Dübendorf, Cyclo-cross (SUI)
2nd in Prologue Tour Alsace, Sausheim (FRA)
2nd in Bern-West (SUI)
2nd in Las Vegas, Cyclo-cross (USA)
2nd in Fehraltorf, Cyclo-cross (SUI)
2nd in Woerden, Cyclo-cross (NED)
2nd in Butzberg, Cyclo-cross (SUI)
3rd in Wetzikon, Cyclo-cross (SUI)

2008
1st in Dübendorf, Cyclo-cross (SUI)
1st in National Championship, Cyclo-cross, Elite, Switzerland, Frenkendorf (SUI)
