= Katrin Leumann =

Swiss cyclist (born 1982)

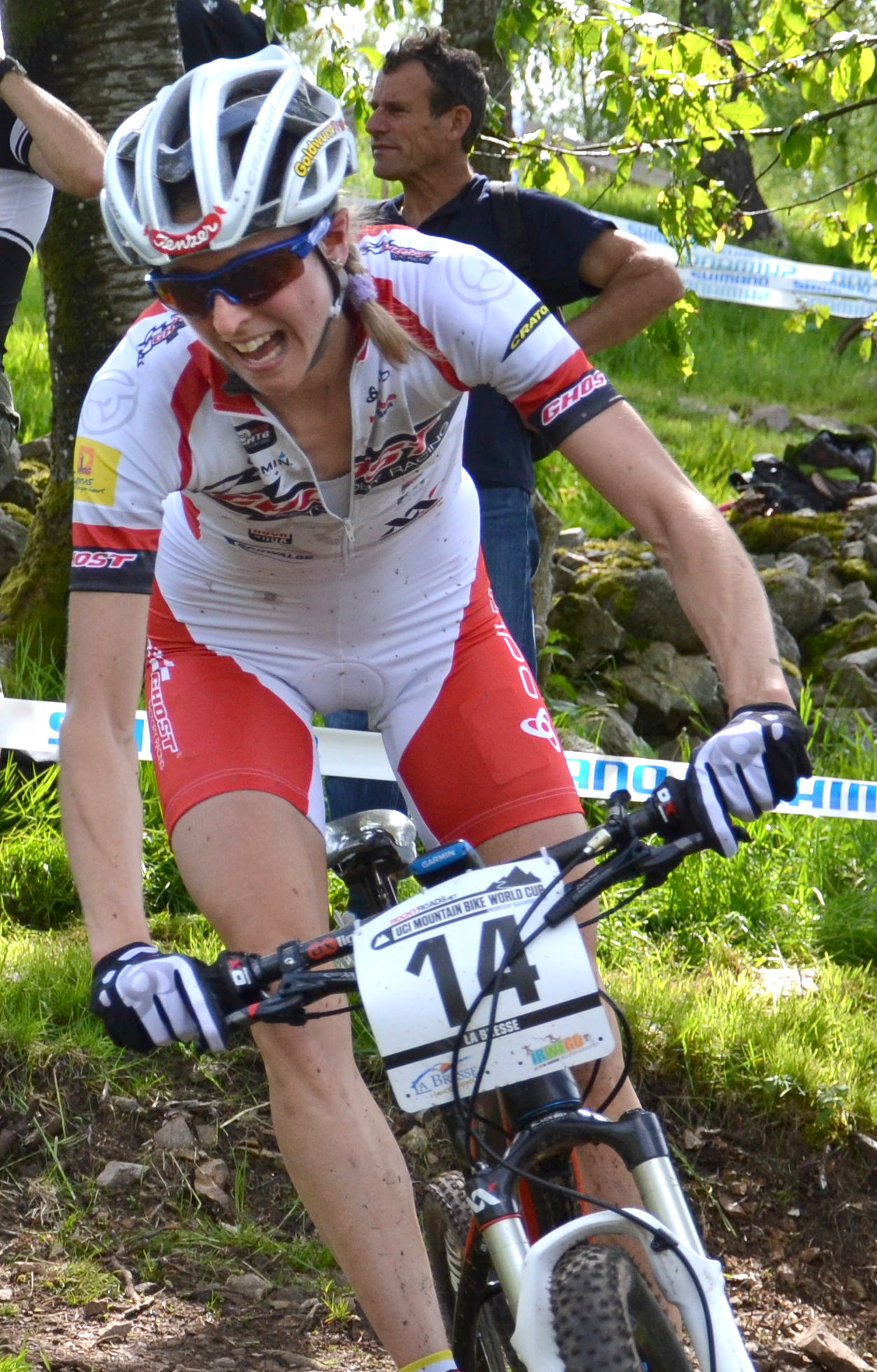
- Leumann in 2012

Personal information
- Full name: Katrin Leumann
- Born: 8 February 1982 (age 44) Basel, Switzerland

Cycling career
- Sport: Cycling
- Discipline: Mountain bike racing
- Role: Rider
- Rider type: Cross-country

Katrin Leumann is a Swiss cross-country mountain biker. She has twice competed for Switzerland at the Summer Olympics. In 2004, she finished in 19th place, a feat she repeated at the 2012 Summer Olympics.

She has won the MTB European Championships in Haifa for ECh MTB in Elite Women category with total time of 01:47:26 Hours.
