= Jakob Caironi =

Swiss cyclist

Personal information
- Born: 5 May 1902 Bülach, Switzerland
- Died: November 1968 (aged 66)

Cycling career
- Sport: Cycling

Jakob Caironi (5 May 1902 – November 1968) was a Swiss cyclist. He competed in the individual and team road race events at the 1928 Summer Olympics.
