= Fabian Lienhard =

Swiss bicycle racer (born 1993)

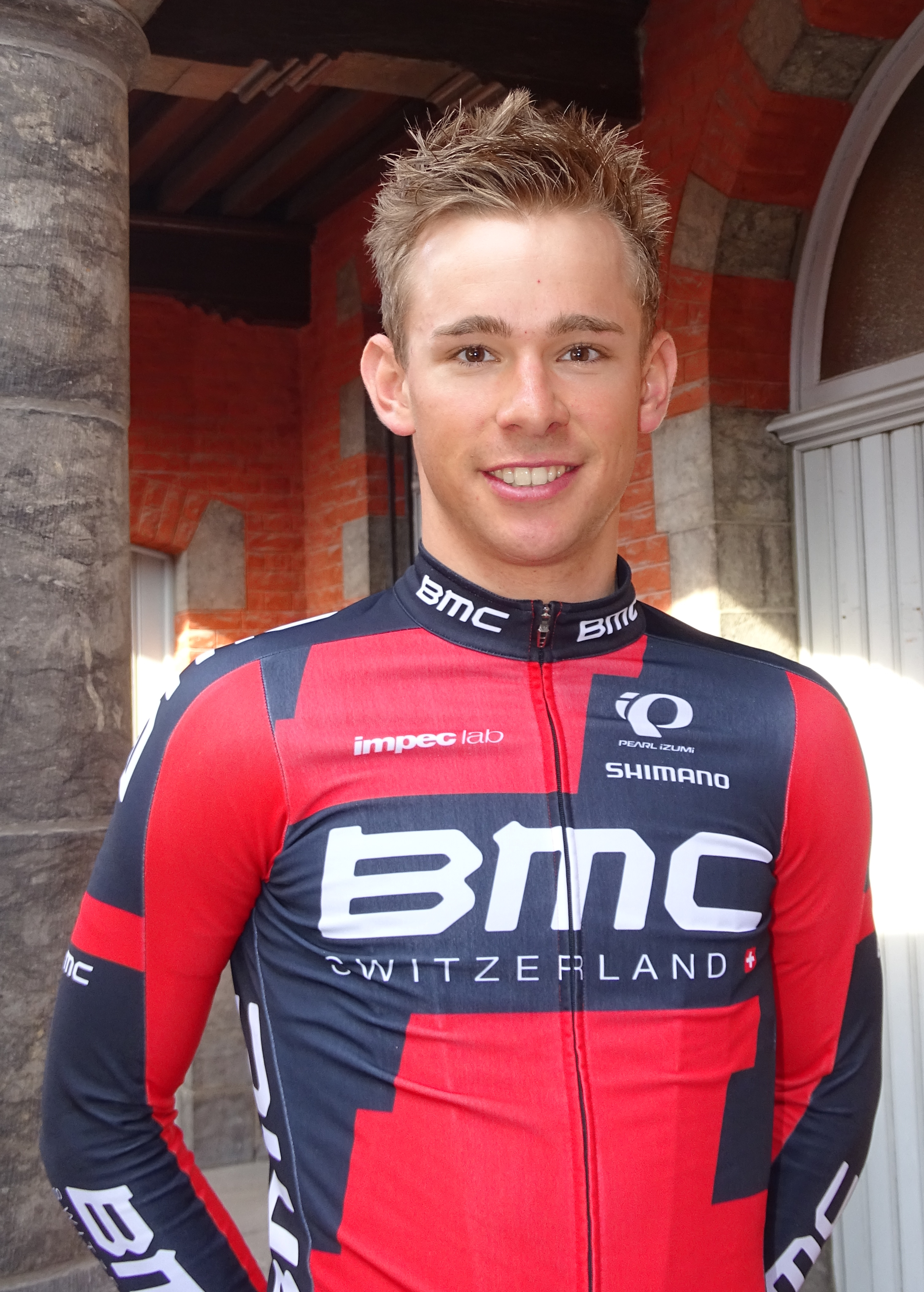
- Lienhard at the 2016 Triptyque des Monts et Châteaux

Personal information
- Full name: Fabian Lienhard
- Born: 3 September 1993 (age 33) Steinmaur, Switzerland
- Height: 1.83 m (6 ft 0 in)
- Weight: 73 kg (161 lb)

Cycling career
- Sport: Cycling
- Current team: Tudor Pro Cycling Team
- Discipline: Road
- Role: Rider

Amateur teams
- 2012–2015: EKZ Racing
- 2016: BMC Development Team

Professional teams
- 2016: BMC Racing Team (stagiaire)
- 2017: Team Vorarlberg
- 2018: Holowesko Citadel p/b Arapahoe Resources
- 2019: IAM–Excelsior
- 2020–2024: Groupama–FDJ
- 2025–: Tudor Pro Cycling Team

Fabian Lienhard (born 3 September 1993) is a Swiss cyclist, who currently rides for UCI ProTeam Tudor Pro Cycling Team.

== Major results ==
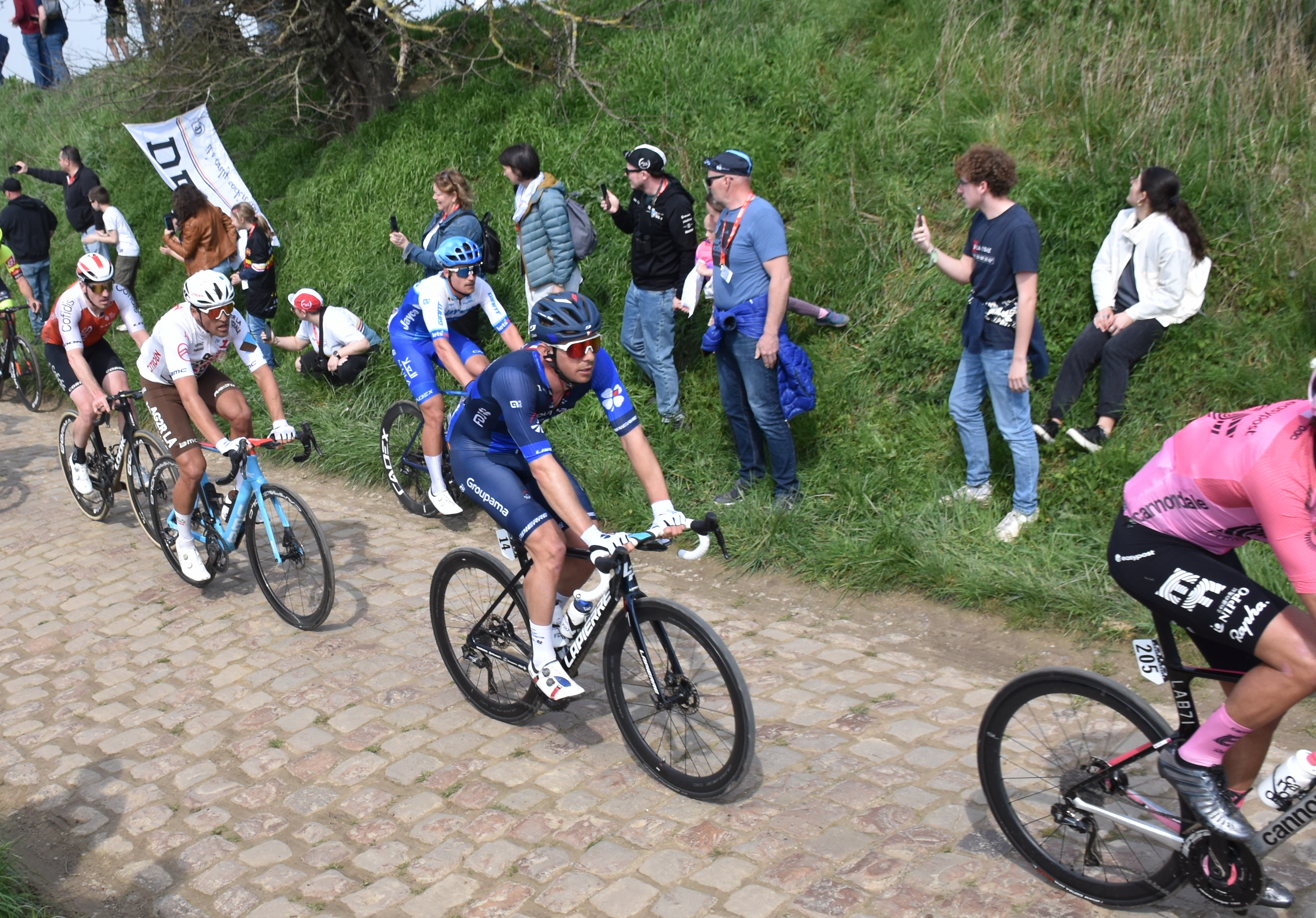
Paris-Roubaix 2023 - Secteur pavé de Quiévy à Saint-Python - N° 14 Fabian Lienhard.

2010
9th Road race, UCI Junior Road World Championships
2013
6th Tour du Jura
2014
National Under-23 Road Championships

1st Road race
3rd Time trial

1st Züri-Metzgete
2nd Dijon–Auxonne–Dijon
6th Overall Flèche du Sud
2015
4th Tour de Berne
6th Road race, UCI Under-23 Road World Championships
2016
4th Tour de Berne
6th Overall Tour de Bretagne
8th Dorpenomloop Rucphen
9th Ster van Zwolle
2017
3rd Rund um Köln
3rd Tour de Vendée
3rd Tour du Jura
3rd Tour de Berne
4th Road race, National Road Championships
2018
1st Stage 1 Tour de Normandie
3rd Winston-Salem Cycling Classic
7th Rund um Köln
2019
1st Poreč Trophy
2nd Overall Tour de Bretagne
4th Druivenkoers Overijse
6th Overall Tour du Loir-et-Cher

1st Stage 2

7th Grand Prix of Aargau Canton
7th Coppa Sabatini
9th Flèche Ardennaise
2020
5th Road race, National Road Championships
2022
5th Road race, National Road Championships
10th Cholet-Pays de la Loire
2025
6th Clásica de Almería

=== Grand Tour general classification results timeline ===
Grand Tour	2022	2023	2024
Giro d'Italia	—	113	139
Tour de France	—		
Vuelta a España	122		

Legend
—	Did not compete
DNF	Did not finish
