= EKZ CrossTour =

Annual series of cyclo-cross races in Switzerland

Race details
- Date: September-January
- Region: Switzerland
- Discipline: Cyclo-cross
- Organiser: EKZ
- Web site: www.ekz-crosstour.ch

History (men)
- First edition: 2014
- Editions: 5 (as of 2019)
- First winner: Clément Venturini (FRA)
- Most wins: Marcel Wildhaber (SUI) (2 wins)
- Most recent: Marcel Meisen (GER)

History (women)
- First edition: 2007
- Editions: 5 (as of 2019)
- First winner: Eva Lechner (ITA)
- Most wins: Pavla Havlíková (CZE) (2 wins)
- Most recent: Christine Majerus (LUX)

The EKZ CrossTour is a cyclo-cross racing series held annually in Switzerland since 2014. It is held over 5 races, and the rider with the most total points is declared the winner.

== Past winners ==
=== Men ===
Year	Winner	Second	Third
2014–2015	(France) Clément Venturini	(Germany) Sascha Weber	(Switzerland) Simon Zahner
2015–2016	(France) Francis Mourey	(Switzerland) Simon Zahner	(Switzerland) Marcel Wildhaber
2016–2017	(Switzerland) Marcel Wildhaber	(Germany) Marcel Meisen	(Italy) Gioele Bertolini
2017–2018	(Switzerland) Marcel Wildhaber	(Switzerland) Simon Zahner	(Switzerland) Nicola Rohrbach
2018–2019	(Netherlands) David van der Poel	(Switzerland) Lars Forster	(Czech Republic) Jan Nesvadba
2019–2020	(Germany) Marcel Meisen	(Spain) Felipe Orts	(Belgium) Dieter Vanthourenhout

=== Women ===
Year	Winner	Second	Third
2014–2015	(Italy) Eva Lechner	(Switzerland) Sina Frei	(France) Stéphanie Vaxillaire
2015–2016	(Czech Republic) Pavla Havlíková	(Switzerland) Sina Frei	(Switzerland) Nicole Koller
2016–2017	(Switzerland) Nicole Koller	(Switzerland) Jasmin Egger-Achermann	(Czech Republic) Pavla Havlíková
2017–2018	(Czech Republic) Pavla Havlíková	(Switzerland) Jasmin Egger-Achermann	(Italy) Rebecca Gariboldi
2018–2019	(Netherlands) Denise Betsema	(Czech Republic) Pavla Havlíková	(Germany) Elisabeth Brandau
2019–2020	(Luxembourg) Christine Majerus	(France) Perrine Clauzel	(France) Marlène Petit
