= 2023–24 UCI Cyclo-cross season =

Bicycle racing competition

Details
- Dates: 19 August –
- Location: World

The calendar for the 2023–2024 men's and women's cyclo-cross season includes cyclo-cross races starting on 19 August 2023, and ending in February 2024. The individual events are classified into five categories. The highest category includes the world cup events (CDM), which gives rise to a ranking. Behind them, we find the C1 and C2 category races, which award points are for the world ranking, then the races reserved for those under 23, also called hopes (category CU) and finally the races for juniors (category CJ) . There are also national championships (NC) which are organized in about thirty countries.

== Men ==
=== Events ===
==== September ====
Date	Course	Class	Winner	Team	References
3 September 2023	(United Kingdom) Hope Supercross Round #1, Herrington Country Park	C2	Thomas Mein (GBR)	Hope Factory Racing	
10 September 2023	(United Kingdom) Hope Supercross Round #2, Bradford	C2	Thomas Mein (GBR)	Hope Factory Racing	
17 September 2023	(United Kingdom) Hope Supercross Round #3, Barnoldswick	C2	Thomas Mein (GBR)	Hope Factory Racing	
24 September 2023	(Switzerland) Radcross Illnau, Illnau-Effretikon	C2	Kevin Kuhn (SUI)	Tormans CX Team	
30 September 2023	(Czech Republic) Grand Prix Ostrava, Ostrava	C2	Victor Van de Putte (BEL)	Deschacht Hens Maes CX Team	

==== October ====
Date	Course	Class	Winner	Team	References
7 October 2023	(United States) Major Taylor Cross Cup - Day 1, Indianapolis	C2	Joris Nieuwenhuis (NED)	Baloise Verzekeringen–Het Poetsbureau Lions	
8 October 2023	(France) Brumath Bike Festival, Brumath	C1	Ward Huybs (BEL)	Baloise Verzekeringen–Het Poetsbureau Lions	
8 October 2023	(Spain) Ciclocross Internacional Xaxancx 2023, Marín	C2	Felipe Orts (ESP)	Burgos BH	
8 October 2023	(United States) Major Taylor Cross Cup - Day 2, Indianapolis	C2	Eric Brunner (USA)	Pivot Cycles	
13 October 2023	(United States) Trek Cup, Waterloo	C2	Pim Ronhaar (NED)	Baloise Verzekeringen–Het Poetsbureau Lions	
14 October 2023	(Spain) Ciclocross Internacional Concello de Ribadumia, Ribadumia	C2	Jens Dekker (NED)	Orange Babies Cycling Team	
19 October 2023	(Belgium) Kermiscross, Ardooie	C2	Gerben Kuypers (BEL)	Circus-ReUz-Technord	
21 October 2023	(United States) Kings CX, Mason	C1	Curtis White (USA)	PAS	
21 October 2023	(Canada) Cyclocross de Lévis, Lévis	C2	Mika Comaniuk (CAN)	VPDH Racing Team	
21 October 2023	(Italy) 5° GP Internazionale CX Citta' di Jesolo, Jesolo	C2	Filippo Fontana (ITA)	CS Carabinieri - Cicli Olympia Vittoria	
22 October 2023	(United States) Kings CX, Mason	C2	Curtis White (USA)	PAS	
28 October 2023	(Italy) International Cyclocross Increa Brugherio, Brugherio	C1	Timon Rüegg (SUI)	Heizomat Radteam	
28 October 2023	(Denmark) Party Prijs CK Aarhus, Aarhus	C2	Arne Vrachten (BEL)	Acrog Tormans	
28 October 2023	(France) Cyclo-cross International Souvenir Anthony Revel #NormandyCX, Brionne	C2	Aaron Dockx (BEL)	Crelan-Corendon	
29 October 2023	(Denmark) Party Prijs CK Aarhus, Aarhus	C2	Arne Vrachten (BEL)	Acrog Tormans	
29 October 2023	(France) Rivabellacross #NormandyCX, Ouistreham	C2	Yorben Lauryssen (BEL)	Pauwels Sauzen–Cibel Clementines	
29 October 2023	(Italy) International Cyclocross Grand Prix Cicli Francesconi, Salvirola	C2	Marek Konwa (POL)	TJ Auto Skoda MB	

==== November ====
Date	Course	Class	Winner	Team	References
1 November 2023	(France) Cyclo-cross International de Dijon, Dijon	C2	Valentin Remondet (FRA)	VCU Schwenheim	
1 November 2023	(Italy) CX Internazionale Firenze, Florence	C2	Gioele Bertolini (ITA)	Fas Airport Services Guerciotti Premac	
3–5 November 2023	(France) European Cyclo-cross Championships, Pontchâteau	CC	Michael Vanthourenhout (BEL)	Pauwels Sauzen–Cibel Clementines	
4 November 2023	(United States) Thunder Cross, Missoula	C2	Eric Brunner (USA)	Pivot Cycles	
5 November 2023	(United States) Pan American Cyclo-cross Championships, Missoula	CC	Eric Brunner (USA)	Pivot Cycles	
18 November 2023	(France) Cyclo-cross Gernelle, Gernelle	C2	Marcel Meisen (GER)	Stevens Bikes Hamburg	
18 November 2023	(United States) North Carolina Grand Prix - Day 1, Hendersonville	C2	Curtis White (USA)	PAS	
19 November 2023	(Italy) Turin International Cyclocross, San Francesco al Campo	C2	Samuele Leone (ITA)	FAS Airport Services-Guerciotti	
19 November 2023	(Japan) Supercross Nobeyama, Nobeyama	C2	Hijiri Oda (JPN)	EF Education–EasyPost	
19 November 2023	(United States) North Carolina Grand Prix - Day 2, Hendersonville	C2	Curtis White (USA)	PAS	
26 November 2023	(Canada) Bear Crossing Grand Prix, Victoria	C2	Evan Russell (CAN)	Global 6 United	
26 November 2023	(France) Cyclo-cross International d'Auxerre, Auxerre	C2	Lander Loockx (BEL)	Unibet Rose Rockets	
26 November 2023	(Japan) Kansai Cyclo-Cross Biwako Grand Prix, Shiga Prefecture	C2	Hijiri Oda (JPN)	EF Education–EasyPost	

==== December ====
Date	Course	Class	Winner	Team	References
2 December 2023	(United States) Nash Dash - Day 1, Hampton	C2	Eric Brunner (USA)	Pivot Cycles	
3 December 2023	(United States) Nash Dash - Day 2, Hampton	C2	Eric Brunner (USA)	Pivot Cycles	
8 December 2023	(Italy) Ciclocross Del Ponte, Oderzo	C2	Filippo Fontana (ITA)	CS Carabinieri - Cicli Olympia Vittoria	
9 December 2023	(Spain) I Ciclocross Internacional Ciudad de Tarazona, Tarazona	C2	Felipe Orts (ESP)	Burgos Burpellet BH	

==== January ====
Date	Course	Class	Winner	Team	References
6 January 2024	(Belgium) Hexia Cyclocross Gullegem, Gullegem	C2	Michael Vanthourenhout (BEL)	Pauwels Sauzen–Cibel Clementines	
15 January 2024	(Belgium) Nationale Cyclo-Cross Otegem, Otegem	C2	Eli Iserbyt (BEL)	Pauwels Sauzen–Cibel Clementines	

==== February ====
Date	Course	Class	Winner	Team	References
3 February 2024	(Czech Republic) 2024 UCI Cyclo-cross World Championships, Tábor	WC	Mathieu van der Poel (NED)	Alpecin–Deceuninck	
25 February 2024	(Belgium) Internationale Sluitingsprijs Oostmalle, Oostmalle	WC	Niels Vandeputte (NED)	Alpecin–Deceuninck	

=== 2023–24 UCI Cyclo-cross World Cup ===
Date	Course	Class	Winner	Team	References
15 October 2023	(United States) UCI Cyclo-cross World Cup #1, Waterloo	WC	Thibau Nys (BEL)	Baloise Verzekeringen–Het Poetsbureau Lions	
29 October 2023	(Belgium) UCI Cyclo-cross World Cup #2, Maasmechelen	WC	Lars van der Haar (NED)	Baloise Verzekeringen–Het Poetsbureau Lions	
12 November 2023	(Belgium) UCI Cyclo-cross World Cup #3, Dendermonde	WC	Pim Ronhaar (NED)	Baloise Verzekeringen–Het Poetsbureau Lions	
19 November 2023	(France) UCI Cyclo-cross World Cup #4, Troyes	WC	Eli Iserbyt (BEL)	Pauwels Sauzen–Cibel Clementines	
26 November 2023	(Republic of Ireland) UCI Cyclo-cross World Cup #5, Dublin	WC	Pim Ronhaar (NED)	Baloise Verzekeringen–Het Poetsbureau Lions	
3 December 2023	(France) UCI Cyclo-cross World Cup #6, Flamanville	WC	Eli Iserbyt (BEL)	Pauwels Sauzen–Cibel Clementines	
10 December 2023	(Italy) UCI Cyclo-cross World Cup #7, Val di Sole	WC	Joris Nieuwenhuis (NED)	Baloise Verzekeringen–Het Poetsbureau Lions	
17 December 2023	(Belgium) UCI Cyclo-cross World Cup #8, Namur	WC	Tom Pidcock (GBR)	Ineos Grenadiers	
23 December 2023	(Belgium) UCI Cyclo-cross World Cup #9, Antwerp	WC	Mathieu van der Poel (NED)	Alpecin–Premier Tech	
26 December 2023	(Belgium) UCI Cyclo-cross World Cup #10, Gavere	WC	Mathieu van der Poel (NED)	Alpecin–Premier Tech	
30 December 2023	(Netherlands) UCI Cyclo-cross World Cup #11, Hulst	WC	Mathieu van der Poel (NED)	Alpecin–Premier Tech	
7 January 2024	(Belgium) UCI Cyclo-cross World Cup #12, Zonhoven	WC	Mathieu van der Poel (NED)	Alpecin–Premier Tech	
21 January 2024	(Spain) UCI Cyclo-cross World Cup #13, Benidorm	WC	Wout van Aert (BEL)	Visma–Lease a Bike	
28 January 2024	(Netherlands) UCI Cyclo-cross World Cup #14, Hoogerheide	WC	Mathieu van der Poel (NED)	Alpecin–Premier Tech	

=== 2023–24 Cyclo-cross Superprestige ===
Date	Course	Class	Winner	Team	References
22 October 2023	(Belgium) Superprestige #1, Overijse	C1	Eli Iserbyt (BEL)	Pauwels Sauzen–Cibel Clementines	
28 October 2023	(Belgium) Superprestige #2, Oostkamp	C1	Eli Iserbyt (BEL)	Pauwels Sauzen–Cibel Clementines	
11 November 2023	(Belgium) Superprestige #3, Jaarmarktcross, Niel	C1	Eli Iserbyt (BEL)	Pauwels Sauzen–Cibel Clementines	
18 November 2023	(Belgium) Superprestige #4, Vlaamse Aardbeiencross Merksplas	C1	Joris Nieuwenhuis (NED)	Baloise Verzekeringen–Het Poetsbureau Lions	
2 December 2023	(Belgium) Superprestige #5, Boom	C1	Joris Nieuwenhuis (NED)	Baloise Verzekeringen–Het Poetsbureau Lions	
27 December 2023	(Belgium) Superprestige #6, Heusden-Zolder	C1	Wout van Aert (BEL)	Visma–Lease a Bike	
28 December 2023	(Belgium) Superprestige #7, Diegem	C1	Mathieu van der Poel (NED)	Alpecin–Premier Tech	
10 February 2024	(Belgium) Superprestige #8, Middelkerke	C1	Eli Iserbyt (BEL)	Pauwels Sauzen–Cibel Clementines	

=== 2023–24 X2O Badkamers Trofee ===
Date	Course	Class	Winner	Team	References
1 November 2023	(Belgium) X2O Badkamers Trofee #1, Koppenbergcross, Oudenaarde	C1	Thibau Nys (BEL)	Baloise Verzekeringen–Het Poetsbureau Lions	
25 November 2023	(Belgium) X2O Badkamers Trofee #2, Urban Cross, Kortrijk	C2	Eli Iserbyt (BEL)	Pauwels Sauzen–Cibel Clementines	
16 December 2023	(Belgium) X2O Badkamers Trofee #3, Herentals	C2	Mathieu van der Poel (NED)	Alpecin–Deceuninck	
1 January 2024	(Belgium) X2O Badkamers Trofee #4, Baal	C1	Mathieu van der Poel (NED)	Alpecin–Deceuninck	
4 January 2024	(Belgium) X2O Badkamers Trofee #5, Koksijde	C1	Mathieu van der Poel (NED)	Alpecin–Deceuninck	
27 January 2024	(Belgium) X2O Badkamers Trofee #6, Hamme	C1	Mathieu van der Poel (NED)	Alpecin–Deceuninck	
11 February 2024	(Belgium) X2O Badkamers Trofee #7, Lille	C1	Niels Vandeputte (BEL)	Alpecin–Deceuninck	
18 February 2024	(Belgium) X2O Badkamers Trofee #8, Brussels	C1	Eli Iserbyt (BEL)	Pauwels Sauzen–Cibel Clementines	

=== 2023–24 Exact Cross Trophy ===
Date	Course	Class	Winner	Team	Reference
8 October 2023	(Belgium) Exact Cross Trophy #1, Beringen	C2	Thibau Nys (BEL)	Baloise Verzekeringen–Het Poetsbureau Lions	
9 December 2023	(Belgium) Exact Cross Trophy #2, Essen	C2	Wout van Aert (BEL)	Team Jumbo–Visma	
22 December 2023	(Belgium) Exact Cross Trophy #3, Mol	C2	Mathieu van der Poel (NED)	Alpecin–Deceuninck	
29 December 2023	(Belgium) Exact Cross Trophy #4, Loenhout	C2	Mathieu van der Poel (NED)	Alpecin–Deceuninck	
20 January 2024	(Belgium) Exact Cross Trophy #5, Zonnebeke	C2	Michael Vanthourenhout (BEL)	Pauwels Sauzen–Cibel Clementines	
7 February 2024	(Belgium) Exact Cross Trophy #6, Maldegem	C2	Eli Iserbyt (BEL)	Pauwels Sauzen–Cibel Clementines	
17 February 2024	(Belgium) Exact Cross Trophy #7, Sint-Niklaas	C2	Michael Vanthourenhout (BEL)	Pauwels Sauzen–Cibel Clementines	

=== 2023-24 UEC Cyclo Cross European Cup ===
Date	Course	Class	Winner	Team	Reference
1 October 2023	(Czech Republic) UEC Cyclo Cross European Cup #1, Ostrava	CU	Victor Van de Putte (BEL)	Deschacht Hens Maes	
8 October 2023	(Sweden) UEC Cyclo Cross European Cup #2, Täby	C2	Daniel Weis Nielsen (DEN)	Kong Gaard Cycling	
17 November 2023	(Slovakia) UEC Cyclo Cross European Cup #3, Šamorín	C2	Daniel Weis Nielsen (DEN)	CeramicSpeed Herning CK	
16 December 2023	(United Kingdom) UEC Cyclo Cross European Cup #4, Clanfield	C2	Cancelled		
24 December 2023	(Italy) UEC Cyclo Cross European Cup #5, Albiate	CU	Luca Paletti (ITA)	Bardiani–CSF 7 Saber	

=== National Cups ===
==== 2023 AusCycling CX National Series ====
Date	Course	Class	Winner	Team	Reference
20 May 2023	(Australia) AusCycing CX National Series #1, Perth	NC	Tristan Nash (AUS)	Unicorn Racing	
21 May 2023	(Australia) AusCycing CX National Series #2, Perth	NC	Tristan Nash (AUS)	Unicorn Racing	
3 June 2023	(Australia) AusCycing CX National Series #3, Adelaide	NC	Tom Chapman (AUS)	Port Adelaide Cycling Club	
4 June 2023	(Australia) AusCycing CX National Series #4, Adelaide	NC	Tom Chapman (AUS)	Port Adelaide Cycling Club	
17 June 2023	(Australia) AusCycing CX National Series #5, Ipswich	NC	Christopher Aitken (AUS)	Sixpence Coffee CX Team	
18 June 2023	(Australia) AusCycing CX National Series #6, Ipswich	NC	Christopher Aitken (AUS)	Sixpence Coffee CX Team	
8 July 2023	(Australia) AusCycing CX National Series #7, Sydney	NC	Christopher Aitken (AUS)	Sixpence Coffee CX Team	
9 July 2023	(Australia) AusCycing CX National Series #8, Sydney	NC	Christopher Aitken (AUS)	Sixpence Coffee CX Team	

==== 2023–2024 Cycling Austria VERGE Sport Cup ====
Date	Course	Class	Winner	Team	Reference
23 September 2023	(Austria) BikeSchneiderei Festival / Cross – Austrian Cup #1, Maria Enzersdorf	NC	Daniel Federspiel (AUT)	Team Felbermayr - Simplon Wels	
30 September – 1 October 2023	(Austria) GP Ternitz – Austrian Cup #2, Ternitz	NC	Maxi Maier (GER)	Fuji Bikes Rockets	
7 October 2023	(Austria) Quer durch´s Stadion – Austrian Cup #3, Pernitz	NC	Manfred Zöger (AUT)	MTB Team Bucklige Welt	
15 October 2023	(Austria) 8. King & Queen of Seeschlacht (Querfeldein) – Austrian Cup #4, Langenzersdorf	NC	Manfred Zöger (AUT)	MTB Team Bucklige	
21–22 October 2023	(Austria) St.Pöltner Querfeldein im Kaiserwald – Austrian Cup #5, Sankt Pölten	NC	Christoph Holzer (AUT)	TSV Bike Total Hartberg	
28–29 October 2023	(Austria) Kraftwerkscross – Austrian Cup #6, Donaustadt	NC	Manfred Zöger (AUT)	MTB Team Bucklige Welt	
1 November 2023	(Austria) Kreuttal Cross – Austrian Cup #7,	NC	Cancelled		
12 November 2023	(Austria) Steiner Cross Wels – Austrian Cup #8,	NC	Daniel Federspiel (AUT)	Team Felbermayr Simplon Wels	
25 November 2023	(Austria) 8. Bad Ischler Querfeldeinrennen – Austrian Cup #9, Bad Ischl	NC	Fabian Eder (GER)	Heizomat Radteam	
26 November 2023	(Austria) 2. SPARKASSEN OÖ Radquerfeldein GP – Austrian Cup #10, Lambach	NC	Fabian Eder (GER)	Heizomat Radteam	
3 December 2023	(Austria) Park-Cross Böheimkirchen – Austrian Cup #11, Böheimkirchen	NC	Philipp Heigl (AUT)	SU Bikestore.cc Team	
17 December 2023	(Austria) CX-Mas Cross – Austrian Cup #12, Gerasdorf bei Wien	NC	Philipp Heigl (AUT)	SU Bikestore.cc Team	
6 January 2024	(Austria) 3KöniXcrosS 2024 – Austrian Cup #13, St. Pölten	NC	František Hojka (CZE)	Expres CZ BMD Team Kolín	

==== 2023 Copa Chile Ciclocross ====
Date	Course	Class	Winner	Team	Reference
30 April 2023	(Chile) Radioruedalibre – Chilean Cup #1, Mostazal	NC	Patricio Campbell (CHI)	Equipo Land Rover -Cannondale	
21 May 2023	(Chile) Ecojauf Cross – Chilean Cup #2, Santiago	NC	Cancelled		
11 June 2023	(Chile) Club Ciclismo Rio Cruce – Chilean Cup #3, Valdivia	NC	Sebastián Román (CHI)	Team MTB Roman	
1 July 2023	(Chile) Club La Squadra – Chilean Cup #4, Santiago Metropolitan Region	NC	Sebastián Román (CHI)	Team MTB Roman	
23 July 2023	(Chile) MTB El Noviciado – Chilean Cup #5, Pudahuel	NC	Patricio Campbell (CHI)	Equipo Land Rover -Cannondale	
13 August 2023	(Chile) Club CXCL – Chilean Cup #6, Curacavi	NC	Patricio Campbell (CHI)	Equipo Land Rover -Cannondale	

==== 2023–24 Toi Toi Cup ====
Date	Course	Class	Winner	Team	Reference
28 September 2023	(Czech Republic) Toi Toi Cup #1, Kolín	C2/NC	Adam Ťoupalík (CZE)	Elkov–Kasper	
7 October 2023	(Czech Republic) Toi Toi Cup #2, Mladá Boleslav	C2/NC	Michael Boroš (CZE)	Elkov–Kasper	
8 October 2023	(Czech Republic) Toi Toi Cup #3, Louny	NC	Josef Jelínek (CZE)	Cyklostar	
14 October 2023	(Czech Republic) Toi Toi Cup #4, Jičín	C2/NC	Michael Boroš (CZE)	Elkov–Kasper	
15 October 2023	(Czech Republic) Toi Toi Cup #5, Chýnov	NC	Michael Boroš (CZE)	Elkov–Kasper	
21 October 2023	(Czech Republic) Toi Toi Cup #6, Holé Vrchy	C2/NC	Michael Boroš (CZE)	Elkov–Kasper	
28 October 2023	(Czech Republic) Toi Toi Cup #7, Plzeň	NC	Pavel Jindřich (CZE)	ČEZ Cyklo Team Tábor	
11 November 2023	(Czech Republic) Toi Toi Cup #8, Rýmařov	C2	Marek Konwa (POL)	TJ Auto Skoda MB	
25 November 2023	(Czech Republic) Toi Toi Cup #9, Čáslav	NC	Adam Ťoupalík (CZE)	Elkov–Kasper	
2 December 2023	(Czech Republic) Toi Toi Cup #10, Hlinsko	C2	Michael Boroš (CZE)	Elkov–Kasper	
9 December 2023	(Czech Republic) Toi Toi Cup #11, Veselí nad Lužnicí	C2	No Elite here		
10 December 2023	(Czech Republic) Toi Toi Cup #12, Veselí nad Lužnicí	NC	Pavel Jindřich (CZE)	ČEZ Cyklo Team Tábor	

==== 2023 Danish CX Cup ====
Date	Course	Class	Winner	Team	Reference
7 October 2023	(Denmark) Danish CX Cup #1, Roskilde	NC	Simon Bak (DEN)	Team ColoQuick	
8 October 2023	(Denmark) Danish CX Cup #2, Roskilde	NC	Bjørn Borreby Andreassen (DEN)	Svendborg Mountainbike Klub	
12 November 2023	(Denmark) Danish CX Cup #3, Odense	NC	Bjørn Borreby Andreassen (DEN)	Svendborg Mountainbike Klub	
18 November 2023	(Denmark) Danish CX Cup #4, Ballerup	NC	Bjørn Borreby Andreassen (DEN)	Svendborg Mountainbike Klub	
19 November 2023	(Denmark) Danish CX Cup #5, Sorø	NC	Bjørn Borreby Andreassen (DEN)	Svendborg Mountainbike Klub	
25 November 2023	(Denmark) Danish CX Cup #6, Skive	NC	Bjørn Borreby Andreassen (DEN)	Svendborg Mountainbike Klub	
7 January 2024	(Denmark) Danish CX Cup #7, Kalundborg	NC	Bjørn Borreby Andreassen (DEN)	Svendborg Mountainbike Klub	

==== 2023 Estonian BikeFanatics CX Karikasari ====
Date	Course	Class	Winner	Team	Reference
24 September 2023	(Estonia) Viljandi CX – Estonian Cup #1, Viljandi	NC	Markus Mäeuibo (EST)	Kalevi Jalgrattakool	
30 September 2023	(Estonia) Rapla CX – Estonian Cup #2, Rapla	NC	Markus Mäeuibo (EST)	Kalevi Jalgrattakool	
1 October 2023	(Estonia) Tallinna CX – Estonian Cup #3, Tallinn	NC	Markus Mäeuibo (EST)	Kalevi Jalgrattakool	
7 October 2023	(Estonia) Elva CX – Estonian Cup #4, Elva	NC	Markus Mäeuibo (EST)	Kalevi Jalgrattakool	
28 October 2023	(Estonia) Rakke CX – Estonian Cup #5, Rakke	NC	Markus Mäeuibo (EST)	Kalevi Jalgrattakool	

==== 2023 Finnish CX Cup ====
Date	Course	Class	Winner	Team	Reference
30 September 2023	(Finland) Finnish CX Cup #1, Olari	NC	Kasper Borremans (FIN)	Cannibal B Victorious	
8 October 2023	(Finland) Finnish CX Cup #2, Valkeala	NC	Nicolas Grönlund (FIN)	Willebrord Wil Vooruit	
28 October 2023	(Finland) Finnish CX Cup #3, Tuusula	NC	Aksel Rantanen (FIN)	GIF	

==== 2023–24 Coupe de France de cyclo-cross ====
Date	Course	Class	Winner	Team	Reference
21 October 2023	Coupe de France de cyclo-cross #1, Quelneuc	C2	Sandy Dujardin (FRA)	Team TotalEnergies	
22 October 2023	Coupe de France de cyclo-cross #2, Quelneuc	C2	Kevin Suárez (ESP)	NESTA - MMR CX Team	
11 November 2023	Coupe de France de cyclo-cross #3, Albi	C2	Rémi Lelandais (FRA)	VCU Schwenheim	
12 November 2023	Coupe de France de cyclo-cross #4, Albi	C2	Tony Périou (FRA)		
9 December 2023	Coupe de France de cyclo-cross #5, Flamanville	C2	Joshua Dubau (FRA)	Van Rysel CX Racing Team	
10 December 2023	Coupe de France de cyclo-cross #6, Flamanville	C2	Joshua Dubau (FRA)	Van Rysel CX Racing Team	

==== 2023–24 German Cyclocross Bundesliga ====
Date	Course	Class	Winner	Team	Reference
9 September 2023	(Germany) 4 Bikes Festival Cyclocross Race, Lützelbach	C2/NC	Loris Rouiller (SUI)	Heizomat Radteam	
10 September 2023	(Germany) Internationaler Ggew Grand Prix Bensheim, Bensheim	C2/NC	Stan Godrie (NED)	VolkerWessels Women Cyclingteam	
7 October 2023	(Germany) International Cyclo-Cross Bad Salzdetfurth #1, Bad Salzdetfurth	C2/NC	Timon Rüegg (SUI)	Heizomat Radteam	
8 October 2023	(Germany) International Cyclo-Cross Bad Salzdetfurth #2, Bad Salzdetfurth	C2/NC	Joran Wyseure (BEL)	Crelan-Corendon CX	
14 October 2023	(Germany) Querfeldrhein - Gravel und Cross-Festival, Düsseldorf	C2/NC	Lander Loockx (BEL)	TDT-Unibet	
15 October 2023	(Germany) Rund um den Lohner Aussichtsturm, Lohne	NC	Marcel Meisen (GER)	STEVENS Racing Team - Cross	
29 October 2023	(Germany) Munich Super Cross, Lohne	NC	Cancelled		
11 November 2023	(Germany) Vaihinger Radcross, Vaihingen an der Enz	NC	Lars Sommer (SUI)	Heizomat Radteam	
12 November 2023	(Germany) Vaihinger Radcross, Magstadt	NC	Fabian Eder (GER)	Heizomat Radteam	
18 November 2023	(Germany) Rund um die Chemnitzer Radrennbahn, Chemnitz	NC	Lars Sommer (SUI)	Heizomat Radteam	
19 November 2023	(Germany) Rund um die Chemnitzer Radrennbahn, Chemnitz	NC	Lars Sommer (SUI)	Heizomat Radteam	

==== 2023/24 National Trophy Series ====
Date	Course	Class	Winner	Team	Reference
7 October 2023	(United Kingdom) National Trophy Series Round 1, South Shields	C2	Thomas Mein (GBR)	Hope Factory Racing	
14 October 2023	(United Kingdom) National Trophy Series Round 2, Thornton in Craven	C2	Jente Michels (BEL)	Alpecin–Deceuninck	
28 October 2023	(United Kingdom) National Trophy Series Round 3, Derby	C2	Thomas Mein (GBR)	Hope Factory Racing	
11 November 2023	(United Kingdom) National Trophy Series Round 4, Paignton	C2	Thomas Mein (GBR)	Hope Factory Racing	
9 December 2023	(United Kingdom) National Trophy Series Round 5, Gravesend	C2	Ben Chilton (GBR)	Ribble Cycles	

==== 2023/24 Magyar Kupa ====
Date	Course	Class	Winner	Team	Reference
7 October 2023	(Hungary) Kamara CX 2023, Budapest	NC	Zsolt Bùr (HUN)	Vialand Racing Team	
22 October 2023	(Hungary) XII. KolorCross, Kazincbarcika	NC	Márk Valent (HUN)	Epronex - Hungary Cycling Team	
28 October 2023	(Hungary) Törökbálint CX 2023, Törökbálint	NC	Gábor Cser (HUN)		
5 November 2023	(Hungary) KunCross CX, Kecskemét	NC	Márton Dina (HUN)	ATT Investments	
11 November 2023	(Hungary) Velopark Debrecen CX, Debrecen	NC	No Elite here		
12 November 2023	(Hungary) Velopark Debrecen CX, Debrecen	NC/C2	Ferre Geeraerts (BEL)	Young Cycling Talent D&D	
18 November 2023	(Hungary) UBM Cyclo-Cross Challenge, Miskolc	NC	Zsolt Bùr (HUN)	Vialand Racing Team	
3 December 2023	(Hungary) Garmin Trail Zone Magyar Kupa, Szekszárd	NC	Márton Dina (HUN)	ATT Investments	
9 December 2023	(Hungary) UBM Cyclo-Cross Challenge, Újbuda	NC	Márton Dina (HUN)	ATT Investments	
17 December 2023	(Hungary) Skilós CX, Siklós	NC	Máté Endrédi (HUN)	GreenZone ZKSE	

==== 2023–2024 Iceland Cyclocross National Cup ====
Date	Course	Class	Winner	Team	Reference
30 September 2023	(Iceland) CX - 1. bikar, Gufunes	NC	Ingvar Ómarsson (ISL)		
1 October 2023	(Iceland) HFR Cross Cup #2, Gufunes	NC	Ingvar Ómarsson (ISL)		
7 October 2023	(Iceland) CX - 3. bikar og Íslandsmót, Reykjavík	NC	Ingvar Ómarsson (ISL)		

==== 2023 Ireland Cyclocross National Series ====
Date	Course	Class	Winner	Team	Reference
17 September 2023	(Republic of Ireland) Ireland Cyclocross National Series #1, Belfast (Northern Ireland)	NC	Darnell Moore (IRL)	Team Caldwell Cycles	
15 October 2023	(Republic of Ireland) Ireland Cyclocross National Series #2, Clonmel	NC/C2	Jente Michels (BEL)	Alpecin–Premier Tech	
22 October 2023	(Republic of Ireland) Ireland Cyclocross National Series #3, Knockroosky	NC	Dean Harvey (IRL)	Trinity Racing	
12 November 2023	(Republic of Ireland) Ireland Cyclocross National Series #4, Drumbane	NC	Jamie Meehan (IRL)	Spellman-Dublin Port	
30 December 2023	(Republic of Ireland) Ireland Cyclocross National Series #5, Jenkinstown	NC	Kevin McCambridge (IRL)	Trinity Racing	
7 January 2024	(Republic of Ireland) Ireland Cyclocross National Series #6, County Wicklow	NC	Dean Harvey (IRL)	Trinity Racing	

=== 2023 Giro d’Italia Ciclocross ===
Date	Course	Class	Winner	Team	Reference
1 October 2023	(Italy) 1° GP Citta' di Tarvisio, Tarvisio	C2	Federico Ceolin (ITA)	Bibione Cycling Team	
8 October 2023	(Italy) CX Rivellino 2023, Osoppo	C2	Federico Ceolin (ITA)	Bibione Cycling Team	
15 October 2023	(Italy) Corridonia MC, Corridonia	NC	Antonio Folcarelli (ITA)	Race Mountain Folcarelli	
12 November 2023	(Italy) Follonica GR, Follonica	NC	Cristian Cominelli (ITA)	Cycling Cafe' Racing Team	
18 November 2023	(Italy) Cantoira TO, Cantoira	NC	Antonio Folcarelli (ITA)	Race Mountain Folcarelli	
26 November 2023	(Italy) Gran Premio Val Fontanabuona, San Colombano Certénoli	C2	Filippo Agostinacchio (ITA)	Beltrami TSA Tre Colli	

=== 2023–24 Luxembourg Cup cyclocross ===
Date	Course	Class	Winner	Team	Reference
30 September 2023	(Luxembourg) Urban Night Cross, Reckange-sur-Mess	NC	Loïc Bettendorff (LUX)	Leopard TOGT Pro Cycling	
7 October 2023	(Luxembourg) GP Garage Thommes, Dippach	NC	Loïc Bettendorff (LUX)	Leopard TOGT Pro Cycling	
15 October 2023	(Luxembourg) Festival du Cyclo-Cross, Kayl	NC	Ken Conter (LUX)	Team Snooze - VSD	
22 October 2023	(Luxembourg) Cyclo Cross régional, Mondorf-les-Bains	NC	Noa Berton (LUX)		
29 October 2023	(Luxembourg) Grand Prix de la Commune de Contern, Contern	C2	Cancelled		
5 November 2023	(Luxembourg) Festival Cyclo-Cross Jos Bausch, Helperknapp	NC	Kay De Bruyckere (BEL)	Pauwels Sauzen–Cibel Clementines	
12 November 2023	Team Snooze – VSD, Luxembourg city	NC	Cancelled		
18 November 2023	(Luxembourg) 1er Grand Prix de l'Armée Cyclo-Cross Interrégional, Diekirch	NC	Mats Wenzel (LUX)	Trek–Segafredo	
19 November 2023	(Luxembourg) Cyclo-Cross Régional, Sanem	NC	Théo Thomas (FRA)	VC Villefranche Beaujolais	
26 November 2023	(Luxembourg) Festival du Cyclo-Cross, Leudelange	NC	Loïc Bettendorff (LUX)	Leopard TOGT Pro Cycling	
3 December 2023	(Luxembourg) GP Sudgaz, Schifflange	NC	Hugo Boulanger (FRA)	VC Hettange Grande	
10 December 2023	(Luxembourg) Cyclo Cross régional, Préizerdaul	NC	Ken Conter (LUX)	Team Snooze - VSD	
17 December 2023	(Luxembourg) Grand Prix Ville Ettelbruck, Ettelbruck	NC	Hugo Boulanger (FRA)	VC Hettange Grande	
1 January 2024	(Luxembourg) Grand Prix Garage Collé, Pétange	NC	Joshua Dubau (FRA)	Rockrider Ford Racing Team	
7 January 2024	(Luxembourg) Cyclo-Cross régional, Hesperange	NC	Mathieu Kockelmann (LUX)	Team Lotto–Kern Haus Outlet Montabaur	
21 February 2024	(Luxembourg) Cyclo-Cross régional, Schifflange	NC	Raphaël Kockelmann (LUX)	Sebmotobikes CX Team	

=== 2023–24 Netherlands CX Cup ===
Date	Course	Class	Winner	Team	Reference
17 September 2023	(Netherlands) Kleeberg Cross, Mechelen	C2	Ward Huybs (BEL)	Baloise Verzekeringen–Het Poetsbureau Lions	
30 September 2023	(Netherlands) 9e Nationale Veldrit van Rhenen, Rhenen	NC	Pete Uptegrove (NED)		
15 October 2023	(Netherlands) GP Oisterwijk, Oisterwijk	C2	Gerben Kuypers (BEL)	Circus-ReUz-Technord	
21 October 2023	(Netherlands) Internationale Cyclocross Heerderstrand, Heerde	C2	Niels Vandeputte (BEL)	Alpecin–Deceuninck	
24 October 2023	(Netherlands) Kiremko Nacht Van Woerden, Woerden	C2	Lars van der Haar (NED)	Baloise Verzekeringen–Het Poetsbureau Lions	
4 November 2023	(Netherlands) Helmcross, Helmond	NC	Remon Delnoije (NED)		
11 November 2023	(Netherlands) 'Metec' Nationale Veldrit Almelo, Almelo	NC	Rens Teunissen Van Manen (NED)		
12 November 2023	(Netherlands) Nationale cross Nijverdal, Nijverdal	NC	Tibor del Grosso (NED)		
18 November 2023	(Netherlands) Janet Memorial Veldrit van Hilversum, Laren	NC	Jelte Jochems (NED)		
3 December 2023	(Netherlands) Nationale Bultcross LRTV Swift tevens RK voor Regio West, Leiden	NC	Mathijs Wuyts (BEL)		
7 December 2023	(Netherlands) Internationale Cyclo-Cross Rucphen, Rucphen	C2	Ryan Kamp (NED)	Pauwels Sauzen–Cibel Clementines	
9 December 2023	(Netherlands) 42e Nationale Veldrit van Amersfoort, Amersfoort	NC	Yaël Plas (NED)		
17 December 2023	(Netherlands) Veldsinkrit van Boxtel- Tevens RK Zuid, Boxtel	NC	Cancelled		
24 December 2023	(Netherlands) RK Zuid - APW Auto's veldrit van Reusel, Reusel	NC	Koen Van Dijke (NED)		
26 December 2023	(Netherlands) Kerstcross 2023, Norg	NC	Thymen Arensman (NED)	Ineos Grenadiers	
7 January 2024	(Netherlands) 19e Kasteelcross Vorden, Vorden	NC	Pete Uptegrove (NED)		

=== 2023 Norgescup CX ===
Date	Course	Class	Winner	Team	Reference
30 September 2023	(Norway) Norgescup #1, Grenland	NC	Kevin Messel (NOR)	Ringerike SK	
1 October 2023	(Norway) Norgescup #2, Grenland	NC	Kevin Messel (NOR)	Ringerike SK	
14 October 2023	(Norway) Norgescup #3, Asker	NC	Kevin Messel (NOR)	Ringerike SK	
15 October 2023	(Norway) Norgescup #4, Asker	NC	Kevin Messel (NOR)	Ringerike SK	
21 October 2023	(Norway) Norgescup #5, Oslo	NC	Sondre Rokke (NOR)	IF Frøy	
22 October 2023	(Norway) Norgescup #6, Oslo	NC	Kevin Messel (NOR)	Ringerike SK	
28 October 2023	(Norway) Norgescup #7, Drøbak	NC	Mats Tubaas Glende (NOR)	Soon CK	
29 October 2023	(Norway) Norgescup #8, Drøbak	NC	Nichlas Øveraasen (NOR)	Soon CK	

=== 2023 Polish CX Cup ===
Date	Course	Class	Winner	Team	Reference
22 October 2023	(Poland) Polish Cup #1, Ełk	NC	Szymon Pomian (POL)	GKS Cartusia Kartuzy	
29 October 2023	(Poland) Polish Cup #2, Kluczbork	NC	Ksawier Garnek (POL)	UKS Krupiński Suszec	
11 November 2023	(Poland) Polish Cup #3, Koziegłowy	NC	Ksawier Garnek (POL)	UKS Krupiński Suszec	
18 November 2023	(Poland) Polish Cup #4, Laskowice	C2	Szymon Pomian (POL)	GKS Cartusia Kartuzy	
25 November 2023	(Poland) Polish Cup #5, Władysławowo	NC	Michał Paluta (POL)	JBG-2 Team	
26 November 2023	(Poland) Polish Cup #6, Władysławowo	NC	Patryk Stosz (POL)	Voster ATS Team	
3 December 2023	(Poland) Polish Cup #7, Gościęcin	NC/C2	Marek Konwa (POL)	TJ Auto Skoda	
9 December 2023	(Poland) Polish Cup #8, Włoszakowice	NC	Michał Paluta (POL)	JBG-2 Team	
10 December 2023	(Poland) Polish Cup #9, Zielona Góra	NC	Marek Konwa (POL)	TJ Auto Skoda	
17 December 2023	(Poland) Polish Cup #10, Sławno	NC	Brajan Świder (POL)	Phoenix Cycling Team	

=== 2023 Taça de Portugal de Ciclocrosse Credibom ===
Date	Course	Class	Winner	Team	Reference
15 October 2023	1ª Taça de Portugal de Ciclocrosse Credibom, Melgaço	C2	Felipe Orts (ESP)	Burgos Burpellet BH	
28 October 2023	2ª Taça de Portugal de Ciclocrosse Credibom, Oliveira de Azeméis	NC	Rafael Sousa (POR)	Guilhabreu MTB	
29 October 2023	3ª Taça de Portugal de Ciclocrosse Credibom, Vouzela	NC	João Cruz (POR)	AXPO / FirstBike Team / Vila do Conde	
18 November 2023	4ª Taça de Portugal de Ciclocrosse Credibom, Paços de Ferreira	NC	João Cruz (POR)	AXPO / FirstBike Team / Vila do Conde	
19 November 2023	5ª Taça de Portugal de Ciclocrosse Credibom, Alameda de Grasse	NC	João Cruz (POR)	AXPO / FirstBike Team / Vila do Conde	
10 December 2023	6ª Taça de Portugal de Ciclocrosse Credibom, Ansião	NC	João Cruz (POR)	AXPO / FirstBike Team / Vila do Conde	

=== 2023–24 Romanian Cup ===
Date	Course	Class	Winner	Team	Reference
4 November 2023	(Romania) Arad CX Cup, Arad	NC	József Attila Málnási (ROU)	Velocitas Cycling Team	
11 November 2023	(Romania) Lunca Timișului CX, Timișoara	NC	József Attila Málnási (ROU)	Velocitas Cycling Team	
2 December 2023	(Romania) Central Stage, Făgăraș	NC	George-Cristian Stan (ROU)	Living Bike Faresin Team	
9 December 2023	(Romania) Cluj Winter Race, Cluj-Napoca	NC	József Attila Málnási (ROU)	Velocitas Cycling Team	
20 January	(Romania) Dorna Cyclocross 2024, Vatra Dornei	NC	József Attila Málnási (ROU)	Velocitas Cycling Team	

=== 2023 Slovak CX Cup ===
Date	Course	Class	Winner	Team	Reference
8 October 2023	(Slovakia) GP Selce – Slovak Cup #1, Selce	C2	Mickaël Crispin (FRA)	Philippe Wagner Cycling	
15 October 2023	(Slovakia) GP Podbrezova – Slovak Cup #2, Podbrezová	C2	Mickaël Crispin (FRA)	Philippe Wagner Cycling	
22 October 2023	(Slovakia) GP Trnava – Slovak Cup #3, Trnava	C2	Marek Konwa (POL)	TJ Auto Škoda	
28 October 2023	(Slovakia) GP Topoľčianky – Slovak Cup #4, Topoľčianky	C2	Václav Ježek (CZE)	Brilon Racing Team MB	
29 October 2023	(Slovakia) GP Topoľčianky – Slovak Cup #5, Topoľčianky	NC	Matej Ulík (SVK)	Expres CZ-Tufo Team Kolín	
18 November 2023	(Slovakia) Grand Prix X-Bionic Samorin – Slovak Cup #6, Šamorín	C2	Marek Konwa (POL)	TJ Auto Škoda	
19 November 2023	(Slovakia) Grand Prix X-Bionic Samorin – Slovak Cup #7, Šamorín	C2	Marek Konwa (POL)	TJ Auto Škoda	
26 November 2023	(Slovakia) Grand Prix Žiar nad Hronom – Slovak Cup #9, Žiar nad Hronom	C2	Marek Konwa (POL)	TJ Auto Škoda	

=== 2023 Pokal Sloveniji v ciklokros ===
Date	Course	Class	Winner	Team	Reference
19 November 2023	(Slovenia) 2. ciklokros Straža, Straža	NC	Mihael Štajnar (SVN)	Meblo Jogi Pro-Concrete	
3 December 2023	(Slovenia) 1. CX za pokal občine Tišina, Tropovci	NC	Mihael Štajnar (SVN)	Meblo Jogi Pro-Concrete	
23 December 2023	(Slovenia) CK Kočevje, Kočevje	NC	Mihael Štajnar (SVN)	Meblo Jogi Pro-Concrete	
26 December 2023	(Slovenia) Ciklokros Ljubljana, Ljubljana	NC	Anže Ravbar (SVN)	Adria Mobil	

=== 2023 Copa de España Ciclocross ===
Date	Course	Class	Winner	Team	Reference
1 October 2023	(Spain) Trofeo Villa de Gijón, Gijón	C2	Kevin Suárez (ESP)	NESTA - MMR CX Team	
7 October 2023	(Spain) Gran Premio Cidade de Pontevedra, Pontevedra	C1	Kevin Suárez (ESP)	NESTA - MMR CX Team	
12 October 2023	(Spain) Ciclocross Internacional Lago de As Pontes, As Pontes	C1	Jens Dekker (NED)	Orange Babies Cycling Team	
29 October 2023	(Spain) Gran Premi Les Franqueses-KH7, Les Franqueses	C2	Gonzalo Inguanzo Macho (ESP)	GD SuperMercados Froiz	
5 November 2023	(Spain) XXX Cyclo-Cros Internacional de Karrantza, Karrantza	C2	Gonzalo Inguanzo (ESP)	GD Supermercados Froiz	
11 November 2023	(Spain) Ciclocross Ciudad de Alcobendas Enbici, Alcobendas	C2	Gonzalo Inguanzo (ESP)	GD Supermercados Froiz	
16 December 2023	(Spain) Ciclo-Cross Ciudad de Xàtiva, Xàtiva	C2	Felipe Orts (ESP)	Burgos Burpellet BH	
17 December 2023	(Spain) Cyclo-Cross Internacional Ciudad de Valencia, Valencia	C2	Felipe Orts (ESP)	Burgos Burpellet BH	

=== 2023–24 Swiss Cyclocross Cup ===
Date	Course	Class	Winner	Team	Reference
1 October 2023	(Switzerland) Swiss Cyclocross Cup #1 - 8. Radquer Mettmenstetten, Mettmenstetten	C2	Kevin Kuhn (SUI)	Circus - ReUz - Technord	
15 October 2023	(Switzerland) Swiss Cyclocross Cup #2 - 62. Internationales Radquer Steinmaur, Steinmaur	C2	Kevin Kuhn (SUI)	Circus-ReUz-Technord	
22 October 2023	(Switzerland) Swiss Cyclocross Cup #3 - AlperoseQuer Schneisingen, Schneisingen	C2	Timon Rüegg (SUI)	Heizomat Radteam	
12 November 2023	(Switzerland) Swiss Cyclocross Cup #4 - 40. Radquer Hittnau, Hittnau	C2	Timon Rüegg (SUI)	Heizomat Radteam	

=== 2023 SWE Cup cykelcross ===
Date	Course	Class	Winner	Team	Reference
23 September 2023	(Sweden) Varberg Cyclocross, SWE CX Cup #1, Varberg	C2/NC	David Risberg (SWE)	Evolite Cycling Club	
24 September 2023	(Sweden) Varberg Cyclocross, SWE CX Cup #2, Varberg	NC	David Risberg (SWE)	Evolite Cycling Club	
7 October 2023	(Sweden) Fristads Cyclocross Weekend Täby, SWE Cup #3, Täby	NC	David Risberg (SWE)	Evolite Cycling Club	
21 October 2023	(Sweden) Hagströmska CX, SWE Cup #4 Falun	NC	David Risberg (SWE)	Evolite Cycling Club	
22 October 2023	(Sweden) Hagströmska CX, SWE Cup #5 Falun	NC	Filip Mård (SWE)	BAUHAUS Sportklubb	

=== 2023 USCX Cyclocross Series ===
Date	Course	Class	Winner	Team	Reference
16 September 2023	(United States) Virginia's Blue Ridge GO Cross, Roanoke	C1	Loris Rouiller (SUI)	Heizomat Radteam	
17 September 2023	(United States) Virginia's Blue Ridge GO Cross, Roanoke	C2	Loris Rouiller (SUI)	Heizomat Radteam	
23 September 2023	(United States) Rochester Cyclocross Day 1, Rochester	C1	Vincent Baestaens (BEL)	Spits CX Team	
24 September 2023	(United States) Rochester Cyclocross Day 2, Rochester	C2	Vincent Baestaens (BEL)	Spits CX Team	
30 September 2023	(United States) USPCX Cyclocross – Charm City Cross - Day 1, Baltimore	C1	Anton Ferdinande (BEL)	Deschacht-Hens-Maes	
1 October 2023	(United States) USPCX Cyclocross – Charm City Cross - Day 2, Baltimore	C2	Andrew Strohmeyer (USA)	CXD Trek Bikes	
28 October 2023	(United States) USPCX Cyclocross – Really Rad Festival of Cyclocross - Day 1, Falmouth	C1	Curtis White (USA)	PAS	
29 October 2023	(United States) USPCX Cyclocross – Really Rad Festival of Cyclocross - Day 2, Falmouth	C2	Curtis White (USA)	PAS	

== Victories ==
8 Victories

- (Poland) Marek Konwa

6 Victories

- (Belgium) Eli Iserbyt
- (United Kingdom) Thomas Mein
- (United States) Eric Brunner
- (United States) Curtis White

5 Victories

- (Spain) Felipe Orts

4 Victories

- (Czech Republic) Michael Boroš
- (Netherlands) Joris Nieuwenhuis
- (Netherlands) Mathieu van der Poel
- (Switzerland) Timon Rüegg

3 Victories

- (Belgium) Thibau Nys
- (Netherlands) Pim Ronhaar
- (Spain) Gonzalo Inguanzo Macho
- (Spain) Kevin Suárez Fernández
- (Switzerland) Kevin Kuhn
- (Switzerland) Loris Rouiller

2 Victories

- (Belgium) Vincent Baestaens
- (Belgium) Ward Huybs
- (Belgium) Gerben Kuypers
- (Belgium) Lander Loockx
- (Belgium) Jente Michels
- (Belgium) Arne Vrachten
- (Canada) Evan Russell
- (France) Mickaël Crispin
- (France) Joshua Dubau
- (Italy) Federico Ceolin
- (Italy) Filippo Fontana
- (Japan) Hijiri Oda
- (Netherlands) Jens Dekker
- (Netherlands) Lars van der Haar

1 Victory

- (Australia) Christopher Aitken
- (Belgium) Wout van Aert
- (Belgium) Aaron Dockx
- (Belgium) Anton Ferdinande
- (Belgium) Ferre Geeraerts
- (Belgium) Yorben Lauryssen
- (Belgium) Victor van de Putte
- (Belgium) Niels Vandeputte
- (Belgium) Michael Vanthourenhout
- (Belgium) Joran Wyseure
- (Canada) Mika Comaniuk
- (Czech Republic) Václav Ježek
- (Czech Republic) Pavel Jindřich
- (Czech Republic) Adam Ťoupalík
- (Chile) Patricio Campbell Vilches
- (Estonia) Markus Pajur
- (Finland) Aksel Rantanen
- (France) Sandy Dujardin
- (France) Rémi Lelandais
- (France) Tony Périou
- (France) Valentin Remondet
- (Germany) Marcel Meisen
- (United Kingdom) Ben Chilton
- (Italy) Filippo Agostinacchio
- (Italy) Gioele Bertolini
- (Italy) Samuele Leone
- (Latvia) Māris Bogdanovičs
- (Lithuania) Venantas Lašinis
- (Netherlands) Stan Godrie
- (Netherlands) Ryan Kamp
- (New Zealand) Craig Oliver
- (Norway) Mats Tubaas Glende
- (Poland) Szymon Pomian
- (Slovakia) Matej Ulík
- (Sweden) Paul Greijus
- (Sweden) David Risberg
- (United States) Andrew Strohmeyer

== Women ==
=== Events ===
==== September ====
Date	Course	Class	Winner	Team	References
3 September 2023	(United Kingdom) Hope Supercross Round #1, Herrington Country Park	C2	Anna Kay (GBR)	777	
10 September 2023	(United Kingdom) Hope Supercross Round #2, Bradford	C2	Anna Kay (GBR)	777	
17 September 2023	(United Kingdom) Hope Supercross Round #3, Barnoldswick	C2	Anna Kay (GBR)	777	
24 September 2023	(Switzerland) Radcross Illnau, Illnau-Effretikon	C2	Hélène Clauzel (FRA)	AS Bike Racing	
30 September 2023	(Czech Republic) Grand Prix Ostrava, Ostrava	C2	Alicia Franck (BEL)	De Ceuster Bonache	

==== October ====
Date	Course	Class	Winner	Team	References
7 October 2023	(United States) Major Taylor Cross Cup - Day 1, Indianapolis	C2	Zoe Bäckstedt (GBR)	Canyon–SRAM Zondacrypto	
8 October 2023	(France) Brumath Bike Festival, Brumath	C1	Marie Schreiber (LUX)	Team SD Worx–Protime	
8 October 2023	(Spain) Ciclocross Internacional Xaxancx 2023, Marín	C2	Laura Verdonschot (BEL)	De Ceuster Bonache CX	
8 October 2023	(United States) Major Taylor Cross Cup - Day 2, Indianapolis	C2	Zoe Bäckstedt (GBR)	Canyon–SRAM Zondacrypto	
13 October 2023	(United States) Trek Cup, Waterloo	C2	Shirin van Anrooij (NED)	Baloise Verzekeringen–Het Poetsbureau Lions	
14 October 2023	(Spain) Ciclocross Internacional Concello de Ribadumia, Ribadumia	C2	Laura Verdonschot (BEL)	De Ceuster-Bonache CT	
19 October 2023	(Belgium) Kermiscross, Ardooie	C2	Annemarie Worst (NED)	777	
21 October 2023	(United States) Kings CX, Mason	C1	Clara Honsinger (USA)	EF Education–Tibco–SVB	
21 October 2023	(Canada) Cyclocross de Lévis, Lévis	C2	Sidney McGill (CAN)	Cervelo / OrangeLiving CX	
21 October 2023	(Italy) 5° GP Internazionale CX Citta' di Jesolo, Jesolo	C2	Carlotta Borello (ITA)	Team CX DP66 GIANT SMP	
22 October 2023	(United States) Kings CX, Mason	C2	Isabella Holmgren (CAN)	Stimulus Orbea Racing Team	
28 October 2023	(Italy) International Cyclocross Increa Brugherio, Brugherio	C1	Sara Casasola (ITA)	Selle Italia-Guerciotti-Elite	
28 October 2023	(Denmark) Party Prijs CK Aarhus, Aarhus	C2	Femke Gort (NED)	Team Proximus-Alphamotorhomes-Doltcini CT	
28 October 2023	(France) Cyclo-cross International Souvenir Anthony Revel #NormandyCX, Brionne	C2	Olivia Onesti (FRA)	Rockrider Ford Cycling Team	
29 October 2023	(Denmark) Party Prijs CK Aarhus, Aarhus	C2	Femke Gort (NED)	Proximus-Alphamotorhomes-Doltcini	
29 October 2023	(France) Rivabellacross #NormandyCX, Ouistreham	C2	Évita Muzic (FRA)	Groupama–FDJ United	
29 October 2023	(Italy) International Cyclocross Grand Prix Cicli Francesconi, Salvirola	C2	Eva Lechner (ITA)	Trinx Factory Team	

==== November ====
Date	Course	Class	Winner	Team	References
1 November 2023	(France) Cyclo-cross International de Dijon, Dijon	C2	Jinse Peeters (BEL)	Proximus-Alphamotorhomes-Doltcini	
1 November 2023	(Italy) CX Internazionale Firenze, Florence	C2	Eva Lechner (ITA)	Trinx Factory Team	
3–5 November 2023	(France) European Cyclo-cross Championships, Pontchâteau	CC	Fem van Empel (NED)	Visma–Lease a Bike	
4 November 2023	(United States) Thunder Cross, Missoula	C2	Clara Honsinger (USA)	Team S&M	
5 November 2023	(United States) Pan American Cyclo-cross Championships, Missoula	CC	Isabella Holmgren (CAN)	Stimulus Orbea Cycling Team	
17 November 2023	(Slovakia) UEC Cyclo-cross European Cup #3, Šamorín	C2	Tereza Kurnická (SVK)	PROefekt team	
18 November 2023	(France) Cyclo-cross Gernelle, Gernelle	C2	Jinse Peeters (BEL)	Proximus-Alphamotorhomes-Doltcini	
18 November 2023	(United States) North Carolina Grand Prix - Day 1, Hendersonville	C2	Caroline Mani (FRA)	Groove Subaru Cycling Team	
19 November 2023	(Italy) Turin International Cyclocross, San Francesco al Campo	C2	Eva Lechner (ITA)	Trinx Factory Team	
19 November 2023	(Japan) Supercross Nobeyama, Nobeyama	C2	Kasuga Watabe (JPN)		
19 November 2023	(United States) North Carolina Grand Prix - Day 2, Hendersonville	C2	Caroline Mani (FRA)	Groove Subaru Cycling Team	
26 November 2023	(France) Cyclo-cross International d'Auxerre, Auxerre	C2	Marlène Morel-Petitgirard (FRA)		
26 November 2023	(Canada) Bear Crossing Grand Prix, Victoria	C2	Isabella Holmgren (CAN)	Stimulus Orbea Racing Team	
26 November 2023	(Japan) Kansai Cyclo-Cross Biwako Grand Prix, Shiga Prefecture	C2	Yui Ishida (JPN)		

==== December ====
Date	Course	Class	Winner	Team	References
2 December 2023	(United States) Nash Dash - Day 1, Hampton	C2	Mackenzie Myatt (CAN)	Cyclesmith Cycling Club	
3 December 2023	(United States) Nash Dash - Day 2, Hampton	C2	Mackenzie Myatt (CAN)	Cyclesmith Cycling Club	
8 December 2023	(Italy) Ciclocross Del Ponte, Oderzo	C2	Sara Casasola (ITA)	Fas Airport Services Guerciotti Premac	
9 December 2023	(Spain) I Ciclocross Internacional Ciudad de Tarazona, Tarazona	C2	Lucía González Blanco (ESP)	NESTA - MMR CX team	

==== January ====
Date	Course	Class	Winner	Team	References
6 January 2024	(Belgium) Hexia Cyclocross Gullegem, Gullegem	C2	Zoe Bäckstedt (GBR)	Canyon–SRAM Zondacrypto	
15 January 2024	(Belgium) Nationale Cyclo-Cross Otegem, Otegem	C2	Marion Norbert-Riberolle (BEL)	Crelan-Corendon	

==== February ====
Date	Course	Class	Winner	Team	References
3 February 2024	(Czech Republic) 2024 UCI Cyclo-cross World Championships, Tábor	WC	Fem van Empel (NED)	Visma–Lease a Bike	
25 February 2024	(Belgium) Internationale Sluitingsprijs Oostmalle, Oostmalle	WC	Lucinda Brand (NED)	Baloise Verzekeringen–Het Poetsbureau Lions	

=== 2023–24 UCI Cyclo-cross World Cup ===
Date	Course	Class	Winner	Team	References
15 October 2023	(United States) UCI Cyclo-cross World Cup #1, Waterloo	WC	Fem van Empel (NED)	Visma–Lease a Bike	
29 October 2023	(Belgium) UCI Cyclo-cross World Cup #2, Maasmechelen	WC	Fem van Empel (NED)	Visma–Lease a Bike	
12 November 2023	(Belgium) UCI Cyclo-cross World Cup #3, Dendermonde	WC	Ceylin del Carmen Alvarado (NED)	Alpecin–Premier Tech	
19 November 2023	(France) UCI Cyclo-cross World Cup #4, Troyes	WC	Ceylin del Carmen Alvarado (NED)	Alpecin–Premier Tech	
26 November 2023	(Republic of Ireland) UCI Cyclo-cross World Cup #5, Dublin	WC	Lucinda Brand (NED)	Baloise Verzekeringen–Het Poetsbureau Lions	
3 December 2023	(France) UCI Cyclo-cross World Cup #6, Flamanville	WC	Lucinda Brand (NED)	Baloise Verzekeringen–Het Poetsbureau Lions	
10 December 2023	(Italy) UCI Cyclo-cross World Cup #7, Val di Sole	WC	Manon Bakker (NED)	Fenix–Premier Tech	
17 December 2023	(Belgium) UCI Cyclo-cross World Cup #8, Namur	WC	Ceylin del Carmen Alvarado (NED)	Alpecin–Premier Tech	
23 December 2023	(Belgium) UCI Cyclo-cross World Cup #9, Antwerp	WC	Fem van Empel (NED)	Visma–Lease a Bike	
26 December 2023	(Belgium) UCI Cyclo-cross World Cup #10, Gavere	WC	Puck Pieterse (NED)	Fenix–Premier Tech	
30 December 2023	(Netherlands) UCI Cyclo-cross World Cup #11, Hulst	WC	Puck Pieterse (NED)	Fenix–Premier Tech	
7 January 2024	(Belgium) UCI Cyclo-cross World Cup #12, Zonhoven	WC	Puck Pieterse (NED)	Alpecin–Premier Tech	
21 January 2024	(Spain) UCI Cyclo-cross World Cup #13, Benidorm	WC	Fem van Empel (NED)	Visma–Lease a Bike	
28 January 2024	(Netherlands) UCI Cyclo-cross World Cup #14, Hoogerheide	WC	Fem van Empel (NED)	Visma–Lease a Bike	

=== 2023–24 Cyclo-cross Superprestige ===
Date	Course	Class	Winner	Team	References
22 October 2023	(Belgium) Superprestige #1, Overijse	C1	Fem van Empel (NED)	Visma–Lease a Bike	
28 October 2023	(Belgium) Superprestige #2, Oostkamp	C1	Ceylin del Carmen Alvarado (NED)	Alpecin–Premier Tech	
11 November 2023	(Belgium) Superprestige #3, Jaarmarktcross, Niel	C1	Ceylin del Carmen Alvarado (NED)	Alpecin–Premier Tech	
18 November 2023	(Belgium) Superprestige #4, Vlaamse Aardbeiencross Merksplas	C1	Ceylin del Carmen Alvarado (NED)	Alpecin–Premier Tech	
2 December 2023	(Belgium) Superprestige #5, Boom	C1	Fem van Empel (NED)	Visma–Lease a Bike	
27 December 2023	(Belgium) Superprestige #6, Heusden-Zolder	C1	Fem van Empel (NED)	Visma–Lease a Bike	
28 December 2023	(Belgium) Superprestige #7, Diegem	C1	Puck Pieterse (NED)	Fenix–Premier Tech	
10 February 2024	(Belgium) Superprestige #8, Middelkerke	C1	Lucinda Brand (NED)	Baloise Verzekeringen–Het Poetsbureau Lions	

=== 2023–24 X2O Badkamers Trofee ===
Date	Course	Class	Winner	Team	References
1 November 2023	(Belgium) X2O Badkamers Trofee #1, Koppenbergcross, Oudenaarde	C1	Fem van Empel (NED)	Team Jumbo–Visma	
25 November 2023	(Belgium) X2O Badkamers Trofee #2, Urban Cross, Kortrijk	C2	Fem van Empel (NED)	Team Jumbo–Visma	
16 December 2023	(Belgium) X2O Badkamers Trofee #3, Herentals	C2	Fem van Empel (NED)	Team Jumbo–Visma	
1 January 2024	(Belgium) X2O Badkamers Trofee #4, Baal	C1	Fem van Empel (NED)	Visma–Lease a Bike	
4 January 2024	(Belgium) X2O Badkamers Trofee #5, Koksijde	C1	Fem van Empel (NED)	Visma–Lease a Bike	
27 January 2024	(Belgium) X2O Badkamers Trofee #6, Hamme	C1	Fem van Empel (NED)	Visma–Lease a Bike	
11 February 2024	(Belgium) X2O Badkamers Trofee #7, Lille	C1	Fem van Empel (NED)	Visma–Lease a Bike	
18 February 2024	(Belgium) X2O Badkamers Trofee #8, Brussels	C1	Lucinda Brand (NED)	Baloise Verzekeringen–Het Poetsbureau Lions	

=== 2023–24 Exact Cross Trophy ===
Date	Course	Class	Winner	Team	Reference
8 October 2023	(Belgium) Exact Cross Trophy #1, Beringen	C2	Fem van Empel (NED)	Visma–Lease a Bike	
9 December 2023	(Belgium) Exact Cross Trophy #2, Essen	C2	Marion Norbert-Riberolle (BEL)	Crelan Corendon	
22 December 2023	(Belgium) Exact Cross Trophy #3, Mol	C2	Lucinda Brand (NED)	Baloise Verzekeringen–Het Poetsbureau Lions	
29 December 2023	(Belgium) Exact Cross Trophy #4, Loenhout	C2	Sanne Cant (BEL)	Fenix–Deceuninck	
20 January 2024	(Belgium) Exact Cross Trophy #5, Zonnebeke	C2	Marion Norbert-Riberolle (BEL)	Crelan-Corendon	
7 February 2024	(Belgium) Exact Cross Trophy #6, Maldegem	C2	Laura Verdonschot (BEL)	De Ceuster–Bonache	
17 February 2024	(Belgium) Exact Cross Trophy #7, Sint-Niklaas	C2	Lucinda Brand (NED)	Baloise Verzekeringen–Het Poetsbureau Lions	

=== 2023-24 UEC Cyclo Cross European Cup ===
Date	Course	Class	Winner	Team	Reference
1 October 2023	(Czech Republic) UEC Cyclo Cross European Cup #1, Ostrava	CU	Kristýna Zemanová (CZE)	Brilon Racing Team MB	
8 October 2023	(Sweden) UEC Cyclo Cross European Cup #2, Täby	C2	Febe De Smedt (BEL)	Tormans CX	
17 November 2023	(Slovakia) UEC Cyclo Cross European Cup #3, Šamorín	C2	Tereza Kurnická (SVK)		
16 December 2023	(United Kingdom) UEC Cyclo Cross European Cup #4, Clanfield	C2	Cancelled		
24 December 2023	(Italy) UEC Cyclo Cross European Cup #5, Albiate	CU	Valentina Corvi (ITA)		

=== National Cups ===
==== 2023 AusCycling CX National Series ====
Date	Course	Class	Winner	Team	Reference
20 May 2023	(Australia) AusCycing CX National Series #1, Perth	NC	Rebecca Locke (AUS)		
21 May 2023	(Australia) AusCycing CX National Series #2, Perth	NC	Rebecca Locke (AUS)		
3 June 2023	(Australia) AusCycing CX National Series #3, Adelaide	NC	Rebecca Locke (AUS)		
4 June 2023	(Australia) AusCycing CX National Series #4, Adelaide	NC	Rebecca Locke (AUS)		
17 June 2023	(Australia) AusCycing CX National Series #5, Ipswich	NC	Miranda Griffiths (AUS)		
18 June 2023	(Australia) AusCycing CX National Series #6, Ipswich	NC	Rebecca Locke (AUS)		
8 July 2023	(Australia) AusCycing CX National Series #7, Sydney	NC	Miranda Griffiths (AUS)		
9 July 2023	(Australia) AusCycing CX National Series #8, Sydney	NC	Miranda Griffiths (AUS)		

==== 2023–2024 Cycling Austria VERGE Sport Cup ====
Date	Course	Class	Winner	Team	Reference
23 September 2023	(Austria) BikeSchneiderei Festival / Cross – Austrian Cup #1, Maria Enzersdorf	NC	Nadja Heigl (AUT)	KTM Alchemist	
30 September – 1 October 2023	(Austria) GP Ternitz – Austrian Cup #2, Ternitz	NC	Anna Hofmann (AUT)	C-Sou Cycling Team	
7 October 2023	(Austria) Quer durch´s Stadion – Austrian Cup #3, Pernitz	NC	Silke Mair (AUT)	RC Arbö Felbermayr Wels	
15 October 2023	(Austria) 8. King & Queen of Seeschlacht (Querfeldein) – Austrian Cup #4, Langenzersdorf	NC	Nadja Heigl (AUT)	SU Bikestore.cc Team	
21–22 October 2023	(Austria) St.Pöltner Querfeldein im Kaiserwald – Austrian Cup #5, Sankt Pölten	NC	Silke Mair (AUT)	RC Arbö Felbermayr Wels	
28–29 October 2023	(Austria) Kraftwerkscross – Austrian Cup #6, Donaustadt	NC	Nadja Heigl (AUT)	KTM Alchemist	
1 November 2023	(Austria) Kreuttal Cross – Austrian Cup #7,	NC	Cancelled		
12 November 2023	(Austria) Steiner Cross Wels – Austrian Cup #8,	NC	Nadja Heigl (AUT)	KTM Alchemist	
25 November 2023	(Austria) 8. Bad Ischler Querfeldeinrennen – Austrian Cup #9, Bad Ischl	NC	Silke Mair (AUT)	RC ARBÖ Felbermayr	
26 November 2023	(Austria) 2. SPARKASSEN OÖ Radquerfeldein GP – Austrian Cup #10, Lambach	NC	Nadja Heigl (AUT)	KTM Alchemist	
3 December 2023	(Austria) Park-Cross Böheimkirchen – Austrian Cup #11, Böheimkirchen	NC	Silke Mair (AUT)	RC ARBÖ Felbermayr	
17 December 2023	(Austria) CX-Mas Cross – Austrian Cup #12, Gerasdorf bei Wien	NC	Nadja Heigl (AUT)	KTM Alchemist	
6 January 2024	(Austria) 3KöniXcrosS 2024 – Austrian Cup #13, St. Pölten	NC	Nadja Heigl (AUT)	KTM Alchemist	

==== 2023 Copa Chile Ciclocross ====
Date	Course	Class	Winner	Team	Reference
30 April 2023	(Chile) Radioruedalibre – Chilean Cup #1, Mostazal	NC	Evelyn Muñoz (CHI)		
21 May 2023	(Chile) Ecojauf Cross – Chilean Cup #2, Santiago	NC	Cancelled		
11 June 2023	(Chile) Club Ciclismo Rio Cruce – Chilean Cup #3, Valdivia	NC	—	—	
1 July 2023	(Chile) Club La Squadra – Chilean Cup #4, Santiago Metropolitan Region	NC	Daniela Rojas (CHI)		
23 July 2023	(Chile) MTB El Noviciado – Chilean Cup #5, Pudahuel	NC	Fernanda Castro (CHI)		
13 August 2023	(Chile) Club CXCL – Chilean Cup #6, Santiago	NC	Daniela Rojas (CHI)		

==== 2023–24 Toi Toi Cup ====
Date	Course	Class	Winner	Team	Reference
28 September 2023	(Czech Republic) Toi Toi Cup #1, Kolín	C2/NC	Kristýna Zemanová (CZE)	Brilon Racing Team MB	
7 October 2023	(Czech Republic) Toi Toi Cup #2, Mladá Boleslav	C2/NC	Kristýna Zemanová (CZE)	Brilon Racing Team MB	
8 October 2023	(Czech Republic) Toi Toi Cup #3, Louny	NC	Pavla Havlíková (CZE)	LAWI Junior Team	
14 October 2023	(Czech Republic) Toi Toi Cup #4, Jičín	C2/NC	Kristýna Zemanová (CZE)	Brilon Racing Team MB	
15 October 2023	(Czech Republic) Toi Toi Cup #5, Chýnov	NC	Kateřina Hladíková (CZE)	Brilon Racing Team MB	
21 October 2023	(Czech Republic) Toi Toi Cup #6, Holé Vrchy	C2/NC	Kristýna Zemanová (CZE)	Brilon Racing Team MB	
28 October 2023	(Czech Republic) Toi Toi Cup #7, Plzeň	NC	Eliška Kvasničková (CZE)	SportRaces Cycling Team	
11 November 2023	(Czech Republic) Toi Toi Cup #8, Rýmařov	C2	Joyce Vanderbeken (BEL)		
25 November 2023	(Czech Republic) Toi Toi Cup #9, Čáslav	NC	Nikola Nosková (CZE)	Czech MultiSport Coaching	
2 December 2023	(Czech Republic) Toi Toi Cup #10, Hlinsko	C2	Kristýna Zemanová (CZE)	Brilon Racing Team MB	
9 December 2023	(Czech Republic) Toi Toi Cup #11, Veselí nad Lužnicí	C2	No Elite here		
10 December 2023	(Czech Republic) Toi Toi Cup #12, Veselí nad Lužnicí	NC	Sofia Ungerová (SVK)		

==== 2023 Danish CX Cup ====
Date	Course	Class	Winner	Team	Reference
7 October 2023	(Denmark) Danish CX Cup #1, Roskilde	NC	Ann-Dorthe Lisbygd (DEN)	Dansk Mountainbike Klub	
8 October 2023	(Denmark) Danish CX Cup #2, Roskilde	NC	Ann-Dorthe Lisbygd (DEN)	Dansk Mountainbike Klub	
12 November 2023	(Denmark) Danish CX Cup #3, Odense	NC	Ann-Dorthe Lisbygd (DEN)	Dansk Mountainbike Klub	
18 November 2023	(Denmark) Danish CX Cup #4, Ballerup	NC	Ann-Dorthe Lisbygd (DEN)	Dansk Mountainbike Klub	
19 November 2023	(Denmark) Danish CX Cup #5, Sorø	NC	Ann-Dorthe Lisbygd (DEN)	Dansk Mountainbike Klub	
25 November 2023	(Denmark) Danish CX Cup #6, Skive	NC	Nikoline Splittorff (DEN)	Holte MTB Klub	
7 January 2024	(Denmark) Danish CX Cup #7, Kalundborg	NC	Ann-Dorthe Lisbygd (DEN)	Dansk Mountainbike Klub	

==== 2023 Estonian BikeFanatics CX Karikasari ====
Date	Course	Class	Winner	Team	Reference
24 September 2023	(Estonia) Viljandi CX – Estonian Cup #1, Viljandi	NC	Annabrit Prants (EST)	KJK	
30 September 2023	(Estonia) Rapla CX – Estonian Cup #2, Rapla	NC	Sille Puhu (EST)	HWX	
1 October 2023	(Estonia) Tallinna CX – Estonian Cup #3, Tallinn	NC	Annabrit Prants (EST)	KJK	
7 October 2023	(Estonia) Elva CX – Estonian Cup #4, Elva	NC	Annabrit Prants (EST)	KJK	
28 October 2023	(Estonia) Rakke CX – Estonian Cup #5, Rakke	NC	Annabrit Prants (EST)	KJK	

==== 2023 Finnish CX Cup ====
Date	Course	Class	Winner	Team	Reference
30 September 2023	(Finland) Finnish CX Cup #1, Olari	NC	Lotte Borremans (FIN)	Rajamaen kehitys	
8 October 2023	(Finland) Finnish CX Cup #2, Valkeala	NC	Hanna Häkkinen (FIN)	Reaktor Stanga Racing	
28 October 2023	(Finland) Finnish CX Cup #3, Tuusula	NC	Viivi Turpeinen (FIN)	Restore Cycling Team	

==== 2023–24 Coupe de France de cyclo-cross ====
Date	Course	Class	Winner	Team	Reference
21 October 2023	Coupe de France de cyclo-cross #1, Quelneuc	C2	Amandine Fouquenet (FRA)	Arkéa Pro Cycling Team	
22 October 2023	Coupe de France de cyclo-cross #2, Quelneuc	C2	Amandine Fouquenet (FRA)	Arkéa Pro Cycling Team	
11 November 2023	Coupe de France de cyclo-cross #3, Albi	C2	Amandine Vidon (FRA)	Team Fima - RDV BikeShop Alian	
12 November 2023	Coupe de France de cyclo-cross #4, Albi	C2	Amandine Fouquenet (FRA)	Arkéa–B&B Hotels Women	
9 December 2023	Coupe de France de cyclo-cross #5, Flamanville	C2	Hélène Clauzel (FRA)	AS Bike Racing	
10 December 2023	Coupe de France de cyclo-cross #6, Flamanville	C2	Amandine Fouquenet (FRA)	Arkéa–B&B Hotels Women	

==== 2023–24 German Cyclocross Bundesliga ====
Date	Course	Class	Winner	Team	Reference
9 September 2023	(Germany) 4 Bikes Festival Cyclocross Race, Lützelbach	C2	Marie Schreiber (LUX)	SD Worx	
10 September 2023	(Germany) Internationaler Ggew Grand Prix Bensheim, Bensheim	C2	Marie Schreiber (LUX)	SD Worx	
7 October 2023	(Germany) International Cyclo-Cross Bad Salzdetfurth #1, Bad Salzdetfurth	C2	Judith Krahl (GER)	Heizomat Radteam	
8 October 2023	(Germany) International Cyclo-Cross Bad Salzdetfurth #2, Bad Salzdetfurth	C2	Judith Krahl (GER)	Heizomat Radteam	
14 October 2023	(Germany) Querfeldrhein - Gravel und Cross-Festival, Düsseldorf	C2	Francesca Baroni (ITA)	Hubo - Remotive CX Team	
15 October 2023	(Germany) Rund um den Lohner Aussichtsturm, Lohne	NC	Judith Krahl (GER)	Heizomat Radteam	
29 October 2023	(Germany) Munich Super Cross, Lohne	NC	Cancelled		
11 November 2023	(Germany) Vaihinger Radcross, Vaihingen an der Enz	NC	Elisabeth Brandau (GER)	EBE Racing Team	
12 November 2023	(Germany) Vaihinger Radcross, Magstadt	NC	Elisabeth Brandau (GER)	EBE Racing Team	
18 November 2023	(Germany) Rund um die Chemnitzer Radrennbahn, Chemnitz	NC	Lea Lützen (GER)	Kandie-Gang cake	
19 November 2023	(Germany) Rund um die Chemnitzer Radrennbahn, Chemnitz	NC	Lea Lützen (GER)	Kandie-Gang cake	

==== 2023/24 National Trophy Series ====
Date	Course	Class	Winner	Team	Reference
7 October 2023	(United Kingdom) National Trophy Series Round 1, South Shields	C2	Elena Day (GBR)	Team Spectra Cannondale CX	
14 October 2023	(United Kingdom) National Trophy Series Round 2, Thornton in Craven	C2	Anna Kay (GBR)	777	
28 October 2023	(United Kingdom) National Trophy Series Round 3, Derby	C2	Nikki Brammeier (GBR)	Mudiiita CX	
11 November 2023	(United Kingdom) National Trophy Series Round 4, Paignton	C2	Elena Day (GBR)	Team Spectra Cannondale CX	
9 December 2023	(United Kingdom) National Trophy Series Round 5, Gravesend	C2	Xan Crees (GBR)	Team Spectra Racing	

==== 2023/24 Magyar Kupa ====
Date	Course	Class	Winner	Team	Reference
7 October 2023	(Hungary) Kamara CX 2023, Budapest	NC	Viktória Szekeres (HUN)	KTM Team Hungary	
22 October 2023	(Hungary) XII. KolorCross, Kazincbarcika	NC	Adrienn Punk (HUN)	Joyride WCT	
28 October 2023	(Hungary) Törökbálint CX 2023, Törökbálint	NC	Viktória Szekeres (HUN)	KTM Team Hungary	
5 November 2023	(Hungary) KunCross CX, Kecskemét	NC	Viktória Szekeres (HUN)	KTM Team Hungary	
11 November 2023	(Hungary) Velopark Debrecen CX, Debrecen	NC	No Elite here		
12 November 2023	(Hungary) Velopark Debrecen CX, Debrecen	NC/C2	Suzanne Verhoeven (BEL)	De Ceuster-Bonache CX	
18 November 2023	(Hungary) UBM Cyclo-Cross Challenge, Miskolc	NC	Viktória Szekeres (HUN)	KTM Team Hungary	
3 December 2023	(Hungary) Garmin Trail Zone Magyar Kupa, Szekszárd	NC	Niké Péteri (HUN)	Acélvakond Cycling Team	
9 December 2023	(Hungary) UBM Cyclo-Cross Challenge, Újbuda	NC	Viktória Szekeres (HUN)	KTM Team Hungary	
17 December 2023	(Hungary) Skilós CX, Siklós	NC	Viktória Szekeres (HUN)	KTM Team Hungary	

==== 2023–2024 Iceland Cyclocross National Cup ====
Date	Course	Class	Winner	Team	Reference
30 September 2023	(Iceland) CX - 1. bikar, Gufunes	NC	Kristin Edda Sveinsdóttir (ISL)		
1 October 2023	(Iceland) HFR Cross Cup #2, Gufunes	NC	Kristin Edda Sveinsdóttir (ISL)		
7 October 2023	(Iceland) CX - 3. bikar og Íslandsmót, Reykjavík	NC	Kristin Edda Sveinsdóttir (ISL)		

==== 2023 Ireland Cyclocross National Series ====
Date	Course	Class	Winner	Team	Reference
17 September 2023	(Republic of Ireland) Ireland Cyclocross National Series #1, Belfast (Northern Ireland)	NC	Caoimhe May (IRL)	Island Wheelers	
15 October 2023	(Republic of Ireland) Ireland Cyclocross National Series #2, Clonmel	NC/C2	Anna Kay (GBR)	777	
22 October 2023	(Republic of Ireland) Ireland Cyclocross National Series #3, Knockroosky	NC	Caoimhe May (IRL)	Island Wheelers	
12 November 2023	(Republic of Ireland) Ireland Cyclocross National Series #4, Drumbane	NC	Caoimhe May (IRL)	Island Wheelers	
30 December 2023	(Republic of Ireland) Ireland Cyclocross National Series #5, Jenkinstown	NC	Doireann Killeen (IRL)	Kilcullen Cycling Club Murphy	
7 January 2024	(Republic of Ireland) Ireland Cyclocross National Series #6, County Wicklow	NC	Caoimhe May (IRL)	Island Wheelers	

=== 2023 Giro d’Italia Ciclocross ===
Date	Course	Class	Winner	Team	Reference
1 October 2023	(Italy) 1° GP Citta' di Tarvisio, Tarvisio	C2	Francesca Baroni (ITA)	Hubo - Remotive CX Team	
8 October 2023	(Italy) CX Rivellino 2023, Osoppo	C2	Sara Casasola (ITA)	Selle Italia-Guerciotti	
15 October 2023	(Italy) Corridonia MC, Corridonia	NC	Carlotta Borello (ITA)	ASD DP66	
12 November 2023	(Italy) Follonica GR, Follonica	NC	Rebecca Gariboldi (ITA)	Team Cingolani	
18 November 2023	(Italy) Cantoira TO, Cantoira	NC	Rebecca Gariboldi (ITA)	Team Cingolani	
26 November 2023	(Italy) Gran Premio Val Fontanabuona, San Colombano Certénoli	C2	Eva Lechner (ITA)	Trinx Factory Team	

=== 2023–24 Luxembourg Cup cyclocross ===
Date	Course	Class	Winner	Team	Reference
30 September 2023	(Luxembourg) Urban Night Cross, Reckange-sur-Mess	NC	Maïté Barthels (LUX)	Hess Cycling Team	
7 October 2023	(Luxembourg) GP Sonntag Immobilien, Dippach	NC	Anouk Schmitz (LUX)		
15 October 2023	(Luxembourg) Festival du Cyclo-Cross, Kayl	NC	Maïté Barthels (LUX)	Hess Cycling Team	
22 October 2023	(Luxembourg) Cyclo Cross régional, Mondorf-les-Bains	NC	Isabelle Klein (LUX)		
29 October 2023	(Luxembourg) Grand Prix de la Commune de Contern, Contern	C2	Cancelled		
5 November 2023	(Luxembourg) Festival Cyclo-Cross Jos Bausch, Helperknapp	NC	Nina Berton (LUX)	Ceratizit–WNT Pro Cycling	
12 November 2023	Team Snooze – VSD, Luxembourg city	NC	Cancelled		
18 November 2023	(Luxembourg) 1er Grand Prix de l'Armée Cyclo-Cross Interrégional, Diekirch	NC	Christine Majerus (LUX)	SD Worx	
19 November 2023	(Luxembourg) Cyclo-Cross Régional, Sanem	NC	Liv Wenzel (LUX)	Hess Cycling Team	
26 November 2023	(Luxembourg) Festival du Cyclo-Cross, Leudelange	NC	Christine Majerus (LUX)	SD Worx	
3 December 2023	(Luxembourg) GP Sudgaz, Schifflange	NC	Isabelle Klein (LUX)		
10 December 2023	(Luxembourg) Cyclo Cross régional, Préizerdaul	NC	Isabelle Klein (LUX)		
17 December 2023	(Luxembourg) Grand Prix Ville Ettelbruck, Ettelbruck	NC	Isabelle Klein (LUX)		
1 January 2024	(Luxembourg) Grand Prix Garage Collé, Pétange	NC	Christine Majerus (LUX)	Team SD Worx–Protime	
7 January 2024	(Luxembourg) Cyclo-Cross régional, Hesperange	NC	Christine Majerus (LUX)	Team SD Worx–Protime	
21 February 2024	(Luxembourg) Cyclo-Cross régional, Schifflange	NC	Isabelle Klein (LUX)		

=== 2023–24 Netherlands CX Cup ===
Date	Course	Class	Winner	Team	Reference
17 September 2023	(Netherlands) Kleeberg Cross, Mechelen	C2	Aniek van Alphen (NED)	777	
30 September 2023	(Netherlands) 9e Nationale Veldrit van Rhenen, Rhenen	NC	Roxanne Takken (NED)		
15 October 2023	(Netherlands) GP Oisterwijk, Oisterwijk	C2	Blanka Vas (HUN)	Team SD Worx–Protime	
21 October 2023	(Netherlands) Internationale Cyclocross Heerderstrand, Heerde	C2	Manon Bakker (NED)	Crelan-Corendon CX	
24 October 2023	(Netherlands) Kiremko Nacht Van Woerden, Woerden	C2	Fem van Empel (NED)	Visma–Lease a Bike	
4 November 2023	(Netherlands) Helmcross, Helmond	NC	Isa Pieterse (NED)		
11 November 2023	(Netherlands) 'Metec' Nationale Veldrit Almelo, Almelo	NC	Julia van der Meulen (NED)		
12 November 2023	(Netherlands) Nationale cross Nijverdal, Nijverdal	NC	Ilse Pluimers (NED)		
18 November 2023	(Netherlands) Janet Memorial Veldrit van Hilversum, Laren	NC	Ilse Pluimers (NED)		
3 December 2023	(Netherlands) Nationale Bultcross LRTV Swift tevens RK voor Regio West, Leiden	NC	Joyce Vanderbeken (BEL)		
7 December 2023	(Netherlands) Internationale Cyclo-Cross Rucphen, Rucphen	C2	Laura Verdonschot (BEL)	De Ceuster-Bonache	
9 December 2023	(Netherlands) 42e Nationale Veldrit van Amersfoort, Amersfoort	NC	Ilse Pluimers (NED)		
17 December 2023	(Netherlands) Veldsinkrit van Boxtel- Tevens RK Zuid, Boxtel	NC	Cancelled		
24 December 2023	(Netherlands) RK Zuid - APW Auto's veldrit van Reusel, Reusel	NC	Pem Hoefmans (NED)		
26 December 2023	(Netherlands) Kerstcross 2023, Norg	NC	Ilse Pluimers (NED)		
7 January 2024	(Netherlands) 19e Kasteelcross Vorden, Vorden	NC	Mirre Knaven (NED)	AG Insurance–Soudal	

=== 2023 Norgescup CX ===
Date	Course	Class	Winner	Team	Reference
30 September 2023	(Norway) Norgescup #1, Grenland	NC	Malin Karlsen (NOR)	Soon CK	
1 October 2023	(Norway) Norgescup #2, Grenland	NC	Malin Karlsen (NOR)	Soon CK	
14 October 2023	(Norway) Norgescup #3, Asker	NC	Malin Karlsen (NOR)	Soon CK	
15 October 2023	(Norway) Norgescup #4, Asker	NC	Elisabeth Sveum (NOR)	Kloppa Off Road Klubb	
21 October 2023	(Norway) Norgescup #5, Oslo	NC	Oda Laforce (NOR)	IF Frøy	
22 October 2023	(Norway) Norgescup #6, Oslo	NC	Oda Laforce (NOR)	IF Frøy	
28 October 2023	(Norway) Norgescup #7, Drøbak	NC	Oda Laforce (NOR)	IF Frøy	
29 October 2023	(Norway) Norgescup #8, Drøbak	NC	Malin Karlsen (NOR)	Soon CK	

=== 2023 Polish CX Cup ===
Date	Course	Class	Winner	Team	Reference
22 October 2023	(Poland) Polish Cup #1, Ełk	NC	Zuzanna Krzystała (POL)	Pho3nix Cycling Team	
29 October 2023	(Poland) Polish Cup #2, Kluczbork	NC	Zuzanna Krzystała (POL)	Pho3nix Cycling Team	
11 November 2023	(Poland) Polish Cup #3, Koziegłowy	NC	Dominika Włodarczyk (POL)	MAT Atom Deweloper Wrocław	
18 November 2023	(Poland) Polish Cup #4, Laskowice	C2	Dominika Włodarczyk (POL)	MAT Atom Deweloper Wrocław	
25 November 2023	(Poland) Polish Cup #5, Władysławowo	NC	Zuzanna Krzystała (POL)	Pho3nix Cycling Team	
26 November 2023	(Poland) Polish Cup #6, Władysławowo	NC	Zuzanna Krzystała (POL)	Pho3nix Cycling Team	
3 December 2023	(Poland) Polish Cup #7, Gościęcin	NC/C2	Zuzanna Krzystała (POL)	Pho3nix Cycling Team	
9 December 2023	(Poland) Polish Cup #8, Włoszakowice	NC	Zuzanna Krzystała (POL)	Pho3nix Cycling Team	
10 December 2023	(Poland) Polish Cup #9, Zielona Góra	NC	Zuzanna Krzystała (POL)	Pho3nix Cycling Team	
17 December 2023	(Poland) Polish Cup #10, Sławno	NC	Zuzanna Krzystała (POL)	Pho3nix Cycling Team	

=== 2023 Taça de Portugal de Ciclocrosse Credibom ===
Date	Course	Class	Winner	Team	Reference
15 October 2023	1ª Taça de Portugal de Ciclocrosse Credibom, Melgaço	C2	Laura Verdonschot (BEL)	De Ceuster-Bonache CT	
28 October 2023	2ª Taça de Portugal de Ciclocrosse Credibom, Oliveira de Azeméis	NC	Ana Santos (POR)	X-Sauce Factory Team	
29 October 2023	3ª Taça de Portugal de Ciclocrosse Credibom, Vouzela	NC	Joana Monteiro (POR)		
18 November 2023	4ª Taça de Portugal de Ciclocrosse Credibom, Paços de Ferreira	NC	Ana Santos (POR)	X-Sauce Factory Team	
19 November 2023	5ª Taça de Portugal de Ciclocrosse Credibom, Alameda de Grasse	NC	Ana Santos (POR)	X-Sauce Factory Team	
10 December 2023	6ª Taça de Portugal de Ciclocrosse Credibom, Ansião	NC	Ana Santos (POR)	X-Sauce Factory Team	

=== 2023–24 Romanian Cup ===
Date	Course	Class	Winner	Team	Reference
4 November 2023	(Romania) Arad CX Cup, Arad	NC	Salomé Bondor (ROU)	Living Bike Faresin Team	
11 November 2023	(Romania) Lunca Timișului CX, Timișoara	C1	Salomé Bondor (ROU)	Living Bike Faresin Team	
2 December 2023	(Romania) Central Stage, Făgăraș	NC	Salomé Bondor (ROU)	Living Bike Faresin Team	
9 December 2023	(Romania) Cluj Winter Race, Cluj-Napoca	NC	Salomé Bondor (ROU)	Living Bike Faresin Team	
20 January	(Romania) Dorna Cyclocross 2024, Vatra Dornei	NC	Salomé Bondor (ROU)	Living Bike Faresin Team	

=== 2023 Slovak CX Cup ===
Date	Course	Class	Winner	Team	Reference
8 October 2023	(Slovakia) GP Selce – Slovak Cup #1, Selce	C2	Viktória Chladoňová (SVK)	Climberg Sport Team	
15 October 2023	(Slovakia) GP Podbrezova – Slovak Cup #2, Podbrezová	C2	Viktória Chladoňová (SVK)	Climberg Sport Team	
22 October 2023	(Slovakia) GP Trnava – Slovak Cup #3, Trnava	C2	Kristýna Zemanová (CZE)	Brillion Racing Team MB	
28 October 2023	(Slovakia) GP Topoľčianky – Slovak Cup #4, Topoľčianky	C2	Viktória Chladoňová (SVK)	Climberg Sport Team	
29 October 2023	(Slovakia) GP Topoľčianky – Slovak Cup #5, Topoľčianky	NC	Viktória Chladoňová (SVK)	Climberg Sport Team	
18 November 2023	(Slovakia) Grand Prix X-Bionic Samorin – Slovak Cup #6, Šamorín	C2	Zuzanna Krzystała (POL)	PHO3NIX Cycling Team	
19 November 2023	(Slovakia) Grand Prix X-Bionic Samorin – Slovak Cup #7, Šamorín	C2	Zuzanna Krzystała (POL)	PHO3NIX Cycling Team	
26 November 2023	(Slovakia) Grand Prix Žiar nad Hronom – Slovak Cup #9, Žiar nad Hronom	C2	Viktória Chladoňová (SVK)	Climberg Sport Team	

=== 2023 Pokal Sloveniji v ciklokros ===
Date	Course	Class	Winner	Team	Reference
19 November 2023	(Slovenia) 2. ciklokros Straža, Straža	NC	Hana Žumer (SVN)	Born to Win BTC City Ljubljana Zhiraf	
3 December 2023	(Slovenia) 1. CX za pokal občine Tišina, Tropovci	NC	Hana Kranjec Žagar (SVN)	Rajd Ljubljana	
23 December 2023	(Slovenia) CK Kočevje, Kočevje	NC	Maruša Tereza Šerkezi (SVN)	Rajd Ljubljana	
26 December 2023	(Slovenia) Ciklokros Ljubljana, Ljubljana	NC	Maruša Tereza Šerkezi (SVN)	Rajd Ljubljana	

=== 2023 Copa de España Ciclocross ===
Date	Course	Class	Winner	Team	Reference
1 October 2023	(Spain) Trofeo Villa de Gijón, Gijón	C2	Laura Verdonschot (BEL)	De Ceuster Bonache CX	
7 October 2023	(Spain) Gran Premio Cidade de Pontevedra, Pontevedra	C1	Laura Verdonschot (BEL)	De Ceuster Bonache CX	
12 October 2023	(Spain) Ciclocross Internacional Lago de As Pontes, As Pontes	C1	Laura Verdonschot (BEL)	De Ceuster Bonache CX	
29 October 2023	(Spain) Gran Premi Les Franqueses-KH7, Les Franqueses	C2	Irene Trabazo (ESP)	E. Irene T-XSM Clube Ciclista	
5 November 2023	(Spain) XXX Cyclo-Cros Internacional de Karrantza, Karrantza	C2	Irene Trabazo (ESP)	E. Irene T-XSM Clube Ciclista	
11 November 2023	(Spain) Ciclocross Ciudad de Alcobendas Enbici, Alcobendas	C2	Lucía González (ESP)	NESTA - MMR CX Team	
16 December 2023	(Spain) Ciclo-Cross Ciudad de Xàtiva, Xàtiva	C2	Alba Teruel Ribes (ESP)	Laboral Kutxa–Fundación Euskadi	
17 December 2023	(Spain) Cyclo-Cross Internacional Ciudad de Valencia, Valencia	C2	Sofia Rodríguez (ESP)	NESTA - MMR CX Team	

=== 2023–24 Swiss Cyclocross Cup ===
Date	Course	Class	Winner	Team	Reference
1 October 2023	(Switzerland) Swiss Cyclocross Cup #1 - 8. Radquer Mettmenstetten, Mettmenstetten	C2	Hélène Clauzel (FRA)	AS Bike Racing	
15 October 2023	(Switzerland) Swiss Cyclocross Cup #2 - 62. Internationales Radquer Steinmaur, Steinmaur	C2	Sara Casasola (ITA)	FAS Airport Services-Guerciotti	
22 October 2023	(Switzerland) Swiss Cyclocross Cup #3 - AlperoseQuer Schneisingen, Schneisingen	C2	Sara Casasola (ITA)	Selle Italia-Guerciotti-Elite	
12 November 2023	(Switzerland) Swiss Cyclocross Cup #4 - 40. Radquer Hittnau, Hittnau	C2	Sara Casasola (ITA)	Selle Italia-Guerciotti-Elite	

=== 2023 SWE Cup cykelcross ===
Date	Course	Class	Winner	Team	Reference
23 September 2023	(Sweden) Varberg Cyclocross, SWE CX Cup #1, Varberg	C2/NC	Alicia Franck (BEL)	De Ceuster Bonache	
24 September 2023	(Sweden) Varberg Cyclocross, SWE CX Cup #2, Varberg	NC	Alma Johansson (SWE)	Mölndals CK	
7 October 2023	(Sweden) Fristads Cyclocross Weekend Täby, SWE Cup #3, Täby	NC	Alma Johansson (SWE)	Mölndals CK	
21 October 2023	(Sweden) Hagströmska CX, SWE Cup #4 Falun	NC	Alma Johansson (SWE)	Mölndals CK	
22 October 2023	(Sweden) Hagströmska CX, SWE Cup #5 Falun	NC	Alma Johansson (SWE)	Mölndals CK	

==== 2023 USCX Cyclocross Series ====
Date	Course	Class	Winner	Team	Reference
16 September 2023	(United States) Virginia's Blue Ridge GO Cross, Roanoke	C1	Maghalie Rochette (CAN)	Canyon CLLCTV	
17 September 2023	(United States) Virginia's Blue Ridge GO Cross, Roanoke	C2	Maghalie Rochette (CAN)	Canyon CLLCTV	
23 September 2023	(United States) Rochester Cyclocross Day 1, Rochester	C1	Maghalie Rochette (CAN)	Canyon CLLCTV	
24 September 2023	(United States) Rochester Cyclocross Day 2, Rochester	C2	Maghalie Rochette (CAN)	Canyon CLLCTV	
30 September 2023	(United States) USPCX Cyclocross – Charm City Cross - Day 1, Baltimore	C1	Maghalie Rochette (CAN)	Canyon CLLCTV	
1 October 2023	(United States) USPCX Cyclocross – Charm City Cross - Day 2, Baltimore	C2	Maghalie Rochette (CAN)	Canyon CLLCTV	
28 October 2023	(United States) USPCX Cyclocross – Really Rad Festival of Cyclocross - Day 1, Falmouth	C1	Maghalie Rochette (CAN)	Canyon–SRAM Zondacrypto	
29 October 2023	(United States) USPCX Cyclocross – Really Rad Festival of Cyclocross - Day 2, Falmouth	C2	Maghalie Rochette (CAN)	Canyon–SRAM Zondacrypto	

== Victories ==
9 Victories

- (Netherlands) Fem van Empel

8 Victories

- (Canada) Maghalie Rochette

7 Victories

- (Belgium) Laura Verdonschot

6 Victories

- (Czech Republic) Kristýna Zemanová
- (Italy) Sara Casasola

5 Victories

- (United Kingdom) Anna Kay
- (Netherlands) Ceylin del Carmen Alvarado
- (Slovakia) Viktória Chladoňová

4 Victories

- (France) Amandine Fouquenet
- (Italy) Eva Lechner
- (Poland) Zuzanna Krzystała

3 Victories

- (Canada) Isabella Holmgren
- (France) Hélène Clauzel
- (Luxembourg) Marie Schreiber
- (United States) Clara Honsinger

2 Victories

- (Belgium) Alicia Franck
- (Belgium) Jinse Peeters
- (Canada) Mackenzie Myatt
- (France) Caroline Mani
- (Germany) Judith Krahl
- (United Kingdom) Zoe Bäckstedt
- (United Kingdom) Elena Day
- (Italy) Francesca Baroni
- (Netherlands) Manon Bakker
- (Netherlands) Lucinda Brand
- (Netherlands) Femke Gort
- (Spain) Irene Trabazo Bragado
- (Spain) Lucía González Blanco

1 Victory

- (Australia) Katherine Hosking
- (Belgium) Marion Norbert-Riberolle
- (Belgium) Joyce Vanderbeken
- (Belgium) Suzanne Verhoeven
- (Canada) Ava Holmgren
- (Canada) Sidney McGill
- (Chile) Daniela Rojas Meneses
- (Estonia) Laura Lizette Sander
- (Finland) Hanna Häkkinen
- (France) Marlène Morel-Petitgirard
- (France) Évita Muzic
- (France) Olivia Onesti
- (France) Amandine Vidon
- (United Kingdom) Nikki Brammeier
- (United Kingdom) Xan Crees
- (Hungary) Blanka Vas
- (Italy) Carlotta Borello
- (Japan) Yui Ishida
- (Japan) Kasuga Watabe
- (Latvia) Evelīna Ermane Marčenko
- (Lithuania) Daiva Ragažinskienė
- (Netherlands) Aniek van Alphen
- (Netherlands) Shirin van Anrooij
- (Netherlands) Annemarie Worst
- (New Zealand) Josie Wilcox
- (Norway) Mie Bjørndal Ottestad
- (Poland) Dominika Włodarczyk
- (Slovakia) Sofia Ungerová
- (Sweden) Caroline Andersson

== National Championships (NC) ==
Country	Date	Elite	U23	Juniors
Albania	22 October 2023	Olsian Velia; Nelia Kabeta	N/A	Ankel Limaja
Australia	19 August 2023	Christopher Aitken; Katherine Hosking	Tristan Nash; Sophie Sutton	Sam Northey; Ruby Taylor
Austria	13–14 January	Gregor Raggl; Nadja Heigl	N/A	Valentin Hofer; Sophia Knaubert
Belgium	13–14 January	Eli Iserbyt; Sanne Cant	Emiel Verstrynge	Arthur Van den Boer; Ilken Seynave
Canada	25 November 2023	Evan Russell; Ava Holmgren	Ian Ackert; Isabella Holmgren	Jayden McMullen; Raffaele Carrier
Chile	19 August 2023	Patricio Campbell Vilches; Daniela Rojas	Juan Moya Poblete	Maximiliano San Martín Cartes; Ivonne Risco
Czech Republic	14 January	Michael Boroš; Kristýna Zemanová	N/A	Kryštof Bažant; Amálie Gottwaldová
Denmark	13–14 January	Daniel Weis Nielsen; Ann-Dorthe Lisbygd	N/A	Albert Philipsen; Sara Aaboe Kallestrup
Estonia	21 October 2023	Markus Pajur; Laura Lizette Sander	N/A	Oliver Mätik; Liisi Lohk
Finland	18 November 2023	Aksel Rantanen; Hanna Häkkinen	N/A	Kasper Borremans
France	13–14 January	Clément Venturini; Hélène Clauzel	Nathan Bommenel	Paul Seixas; Célia Gery
Germany	13–14 January	Marcel Meisen; Elisabeth Brandau	Hannes Degenkolb; Sina van Thiel	Benedikt Benz; Kaija Budde
United Kingdom	13–14 January	Cameron Mason; Anna Kay	N/A	Oscar Amey; Cat Ferguson
Greece	28 January	Dimitrios Antoniadis; Eleftheria Giachou	N/A	Nikolaos Manthos; Georgia Rompotou
Hungary	13–14 January	Márton Dina; Janka Farkas	N/A	Zsombor Takács; Regina Bruchner
Ireland	13–14 January	Dean Harvey; Aliyah Rafferty	N/A	Conor Murphy
Italy	13–14 January	Filippo Fontana; Sara Casasola	Filippo Agostinacchio	Stefano Viezzi; Elisa Ferri
Japan	13–14 January	Hijiri Oda; Akari Kobayashi	Tatsuumi Soejima	Koshi Narita; Aika Hiyoshi
Latvia	21 October 2023	Māris Bogdanovičs; Evelīna Ermane Marčenko	N/A	Gustavs Gidrēvičs; Amanda Reilija Zariņa
Lithuania	29 October 2023	Venantas Lašinis; Daiva Ragažinskienė	Arnas Bilertas	Matas Kubilius; Gabija Jonaitytė
Luxembourg	13–14 January	Loïc Bettendorff; Marie Schreiber	Mats Wenzel; Liv Wenzel	Rick Meylender; Gwen Nothum
Netherlands	13–14 January	Joris Nieuwenhuis; Lucinda Brand	N/A	Senna Remijn; Puck Langenbarg
North Macedonia	4 February	Kiril Markovski; Elena Petrova	N/A	Andrej Madzoski
New Zealand	19 August 2023	Craig Oliver; Josie Wilcox	N/A	Fletcher Adams; Millie Donald
Norway	11 November 2023	Mats Tubaas Glende; Mie Bjørndal Ottestad	N/A	Aksel Laforce; Kamilla Aasebø
Poland	13–14 January	Marek Konwa; Zuzanna Krzystała	N/A	Dawid Lewandowski; Alicja Matuła
Portugal	13–14 January	Roberto Ferreira; Ana Santos	Rafael Sousa; Laura Simão	João Fonseca; Beatriz Guerra
Romania	13–14 January	József Attila Málnási; Suzanne Hilbert	Patrick Pescaru	Luca Bodareu; Wendy Bunea
Serbia	13–14 January	Dušan Veselinović; Bojana Jovanović	N/A	Igor Davidov; Iva Škrbić
Slovakia	25 November 2023	Matej Ulík; Viktória Chladoňová	N/A	Jakub Benča
Slovenia	23 December 2023	Mihael Štajnar	N/A	Gašper Štajnar; Maruša Tereza Šerkezi
Spain	13–14 January	Felipe Orts; Lucía González Blanco	Raúl Mira	Hodei Muñoz Gabiña; Lorena Patiño Villanueva
Sweden	25–26 November 2023	Paul Greijus; Caroline Andersson	N/A	Vilmer Ekman; Elin Alsjö
Switzerland	13–14 January	Timon Rüegg; Alessandra Keller	Dario Lillo; Jana Glaus	Nicolas Halter; Chiara Mettier
United States	9–10 December 2023	Eric Brunner; Clara Honsinger	Jack Spranger; Lizzy Gunsalus	David Thompson; Vida Lopez de San Roman
