= 2023–24 X2O Badkamers Trophy =

Cyclo-cross competition held in Belgium

2023–24 X²O Badkamers Trophy
- Thirty-seventh edition of the Cyclo-cross Trophy

Details
- Dates: 1 November 2023 – 18 February 2024
- Location: Belgium
- Races: 8

Champions
- Male individual champion: Lars van der Haar (NED)
- Female individual champion: Fem van Empel (NED)

Location of Cyclo-cross Trophy races in 2023-24.

The 2023–24 Cyclo-cross Trophy, also known as the X²O Badkamers Trophy, was a season-long cyclo-cross competition held in Belgium.

== Calendar ==
The competition consisted of 8 events between 1 November 2023 and 18 February 2024.

#	Date	Race	Location	Class
1	1 November	Koppenbergcross	(Belgium) Oudenaarde	C1
2	25 November	Urban Cross	(Belgium) Kortrijk	C2
3	16 December	Herentals Crosst	(Belgium) Herentals	C2
4	1 January	GP Sven Nys	(Belgium) Baal	C1
5	4 January	Duinencross Koksijde	(Belgium) Koksijde	C1
6	27 January	Flandriencross	(Belgium) Hamme	C1
7	11 February	Krawatencross	(Belgium) Lille	C1
8	18 February	Brussels Universities Cyclocross	(Belgium) Brussels	C1

== Results ==
=== Elite Men ===
Date	Race	Winner	Second	Third	Competition leader
1 November	Koppenbergcross Oudenaarde	Thibau Nys (BEL)	Lars van der Haar (NED)	Eli Iserbyt (BEL)	Thibau Nys (BEL)
25 November	Urban Cross Kortrijk	Eli Iserbyt (BEL)	Lars van der Haar (NED)	Cameron Mason (GBR)	Lars van der Haar (NED)
16 December	Herentals Crosst	Mathieu van der Poel (NED)	Tom Pidcock (GBR)	Lars van der Haar (NED)	Lars van der Haar (NED)
1 January	GP Sven Nys	Mathieu van der Poel (NED)	Wout van Aert (BEL)	Pim Ronhaar (NED)	Lars van der Haar (NED)
4 January	Duinencross Koksijde	Mathieu van der Poel (NED)	Pim Ronhaar (NED)	Wout van Aert (BEL)	Lars van der Haar (NED)
27 January	Flandriencross Hamme	Mathieu van der Poel (NED)	Michael Vanthourenhout (BEL)	Eli Iserbyt (BEL)	Lars van der Haar (NED)
11 February	Krawatencross Lille	Niels Vandeputte (BEL)	Joris Nieuwenhuis (NED)	Joran Wyseure (BEL)	Lars van der Haar (NED)
18 February	Brussels Universities Cyclocross	Eli Iserbyt (BEL)	Michael Vanthourenhout (BEL)	Joris Nieuwenhuis (NED)	Lars van der Haar (NED)

=== Elite Women ===
Date	Race	Winner	Second	Third	Competition leader
1 November	Koppenbergcross Oudenaarde	Fem van Empel (NED)	Denise Betsema (NED)	Anna Kay (GBR)	Fem van Empel (NED)
25 November	Urban Cross Kortrijk	Fem van Empel (NED)	Lucinda Brand (NED)	Puck Pieterse (NED)	Fem van Empel (NED)
16 December	Herentals Crosst	Fem van Empel (NED)	Lucinda Brand (NED)	Annemarie Worst (NED)	Fem van Empel (NED)
1 January	GP Sven Nys	Fem van Empel (NED)	Lucinda Brand (NED)	Ava Holmgren (CAN)	Fem van Empel (NED)
4 January	Duinencross Koksijde	Fem van Empel (NED)	Lucinda Brand (NED)	Ceylin del Carmen Alvarado (NED)	Fem van Empel (NED)
27 January	Flandriencross Hamme	Fem van Empel (NED)	Lucinda Brand (NED)	Manon Bakker (NED)	Fem van Empel (NED)
11 February	Krawatencross Lille	Fem van Empel (NED)	Lucinda Brand (NED)	Laura Verdonschot (BEL)	Fem van Empel (NED)
18 February	Brussels Universities Cyclocross	Lucinda Brand (NED)	Marion Norbert-Riberolle (BEL)	Manon Bakker (NED)	Fem van Empel (NED)

=== Under-23 Men ===
Date	Race	Winner	Second	Third	Competition leader
1 November	Koppenbergcross Oudenaarde	David Haverdings (NED)	Viktor Vandenberghe (BEL)	Victor Van de Putte (BEL)	David Haverdings (NED)
25 November	Urban Cross Kortrijk	Arne Baers (BEL)	Wout Janssen (BEL)	Yordi Corsus (BEL)	Viktor Vandenberghe (BEL)
16 December	Herentals Crosst	David Haverdings (NED)	Kay De Bruyckere (BEL)	Arne Baers (BEL)	David Haverdings (NED)
1 January	GP Sven Nys	Victor Van de Putte (BEL)	Jente Michels (BEL)	Ward Huybs (BEL)	David Haverdings (NED)
4 January	Duinencross Koksijde	Ward Huybs (BEL)	Victor Van de Putte (BEL)	Yordi Corsus (BEL)	David Haverdings (NED)
27 January	Flandriencross Hamme	Seppe van den Boer (BEL)	Lucas Janssen (NED)	Wout Janssen (BEL)	David Haverdings (NED)
11 February	Krawatencross Lille	Victor Van de Putte (BEL)	Ward Huybs (BEL)	Arne Baers (BEL)	David Haverdings (NED)
18 February	Brussels Universities Cyclocross	Ward Huybs (BEL)	Victor Van de Putte (BEL)	Arne Baers (BEL)	Arne Baers (BEL)

== See also ==
- 2023–24 UCI Cyclo-cross World Cup
- 2023–24 Cyclo-cross Superprestige
- 2023–24 UCI Cyclo-cross season
