= Selce, Poltár District =

Selce Telep
- Municipality
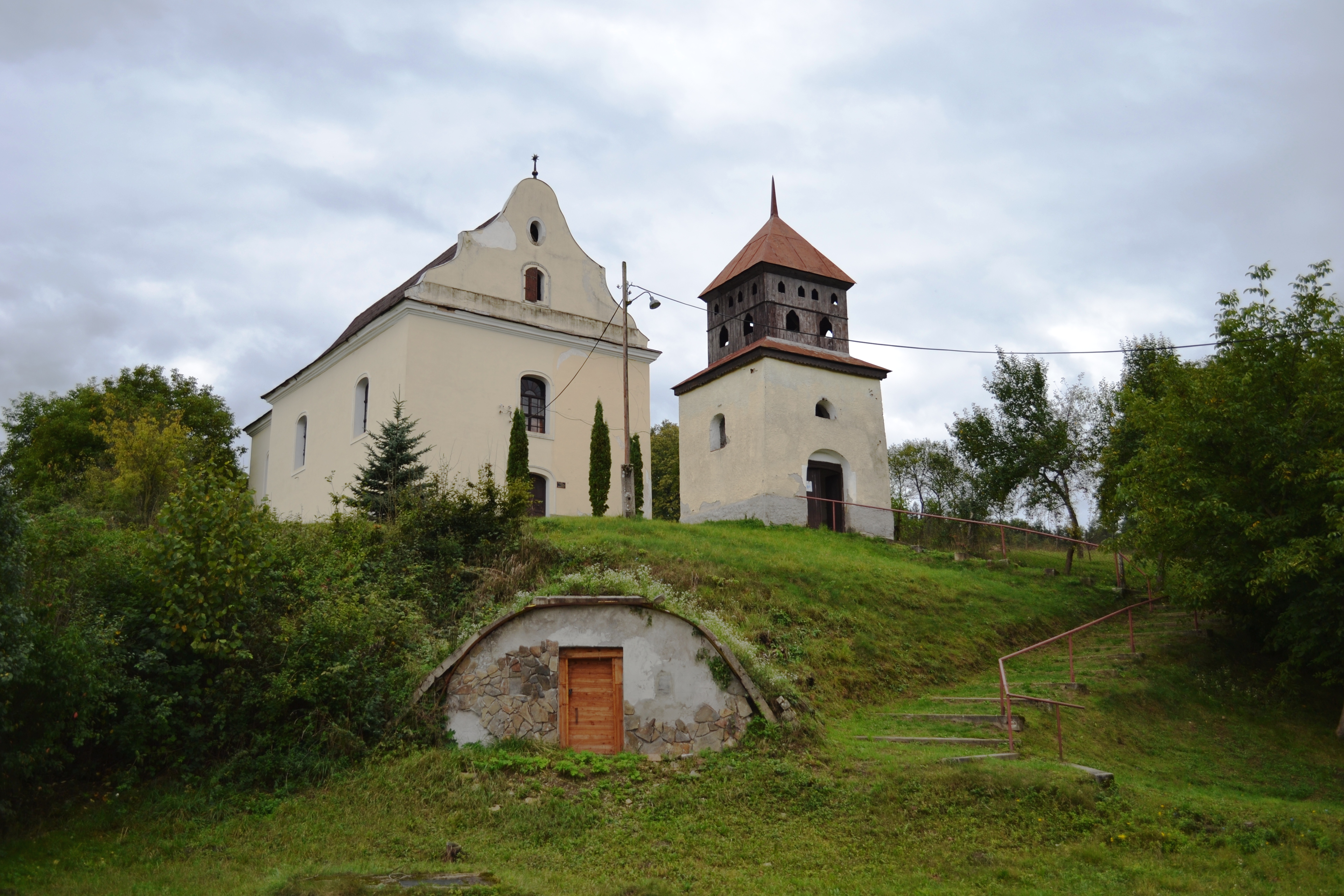
- Evangelical Church

- Flag

- Location of Selce in the Banská Bystrica Region Location of Selce in Slovakia
- Coordinates: 48°27′N 19°52′E
- Country: Slovakia
- Region: Banská Bystrica Region
- District: Poltár District
- First mentioned: 1303

Area
  - Total: 24.40 km^{2} (9.42 sq mi)
- Elevation: 255 m (837 ft)

Population (2025)
  - Total: 120
- Time zone: UTC+1 (CET)
  - Summer (DST): UTC+2 (CEST)
- Postal code: 980 13
- Area code: +421 47
- Vehicle registration plate (until 2022): PT
- Website: obecselce.szm.com

Selce (Hungarian: Telep) is a village and municipality in the Poltár District in the Banská Bystrica Region of Slovakia. In the village there is a food store and a neoclassical evangelical church from the 19th century.

== History ==
Before the establishment of independent Czechoslovakia in 1918, Selce was part of Gömör and Kishont County within the Kingdom of Hungary. From 1939 to 1945, it was part of the Slovak Republic.

== Population ==
Population statistic (10 years)
| Year | 1995 | 2005 | 2015 | 2025 |
|---|---|---|---|---|
| Count | 115 | 99 | 112 | 120 |
| Difference | | −13.91% | +13.13% | +7.14% |

Population statistic
| Year | 2024 | 2025 |
|---|---|---|
| Count | 119 | 120 |
| Difference | | +0.84% |

It has a population of 120 people (31 December 2025).

=== Ethnicity ===
Census 2021 (1+ %)
| Ethnicity | Number | Fraction |
|---|---|---|
| Slovak | 109 | 96.46% |
| Hungarian | 2 | 1.76% |
| Total | 113 | |

In year 2021 was 113 people by ethnicity 109 as Slovak, 2 as Hungarian, 1 as Czech and 1 as Not found out.

Note on population: The difference values of population numbers in the table "Population statistic" and in the sections "Ethnicity" & "Religion" is caused by the use of various statistical methods.

=== Religion ===
Census 2021 (1+ %)
| Religion | Number | Fraction |
|---|---|---|
| Roman Catholic Church | 56 | 49.56% |
| None | 38 | 33.63% |
| Evangelical Church | 14 | 12.39% |
| Not found out | 3 | 2.65% |
| Total | 113 | |

In year 2021 was 113 people by religion 56 from Roman Catholic Church, 38 from None, 14 from Evangelical Church, 3 from Not found out, 1 from Eastern Orthodox Church and 1 from Greek Catholic Church.
