= Böheimkirchen =

- Municipality
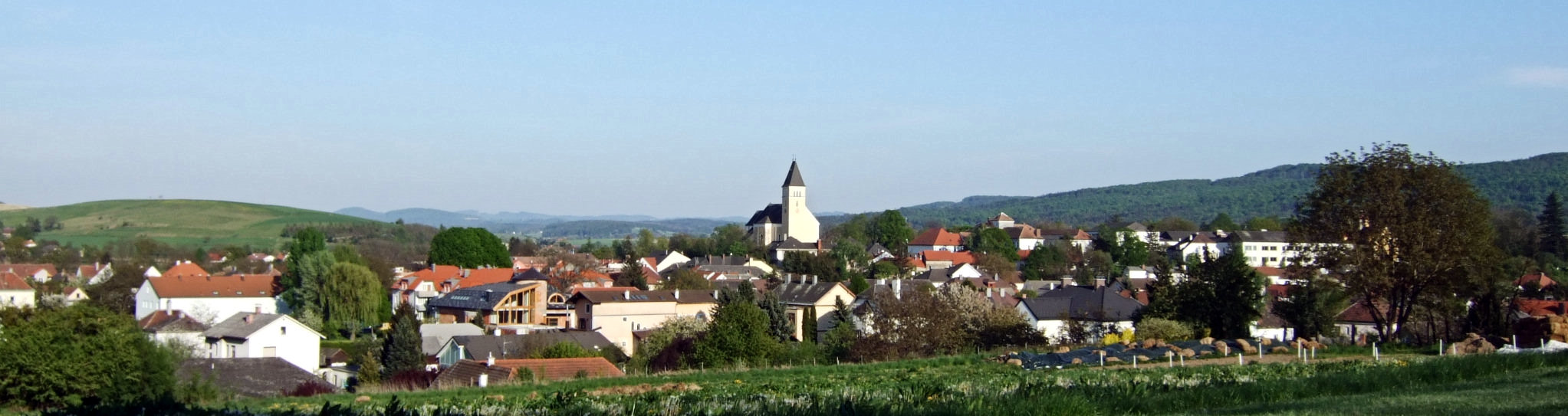
- View of Böheimkirchen

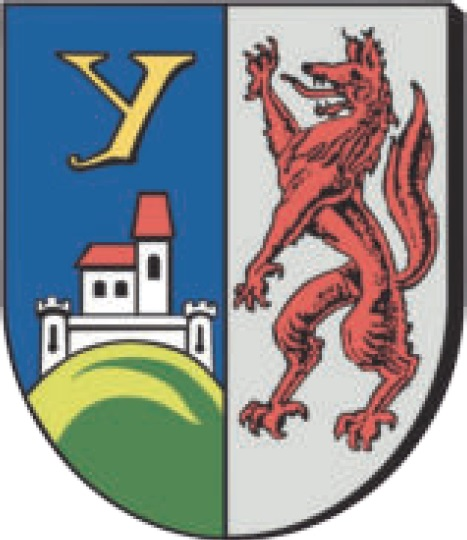
- Coat of arms

- Location within Austria
- Coordinates: 48°12′N 15°56′E
- Country: Austria
- State: Lower Austria
- District: Sankt Pölten-Land

Government
  - Mayor: Franz Haunold (SPÖ)

Area
  - Total: 45.55 km^{2} (17.59 sq mi)
- Elevation: 247 m (810 ft)

Population (2018-01-01)
  - Total: 5,087
  - Density: 111.7/km^{2} (289.2/sq mi)
- Time zone: UTC+1 (CET)
  - Summer (DST): UTC+2 (CEST)
- Postal code: 3071
- Area code: 02743
- Website: Official website

Böheimkirchen is a town in the district of Sankt Pölten-Land in the Austrian state of Lower Austria.

== History ==
=== 2016 Böheimkirchen massacre ===
On 1 December 2016, police discovered the bodies of six people, including three children, at a house in the town after the three children who lived at the house failed to attend school for three days, according to ORF. The bodies of those found dead were all related to each other, while a female relative is suspected of having carried out the murder–suicide. The family, who a neighbour described as "behaving in a very withdrawn way", moved into the house in June 2015.

== Population ==
Historical population
Year	Pop.	±%
1971	3,828	—
1981	3,946	+3.1%
1991	4,145	+5.0%
2001	4,506	+8.7%
2015	4,946	+9.8%
