= Mechelen, Netherlands =

Mechelen Mechele
- Village
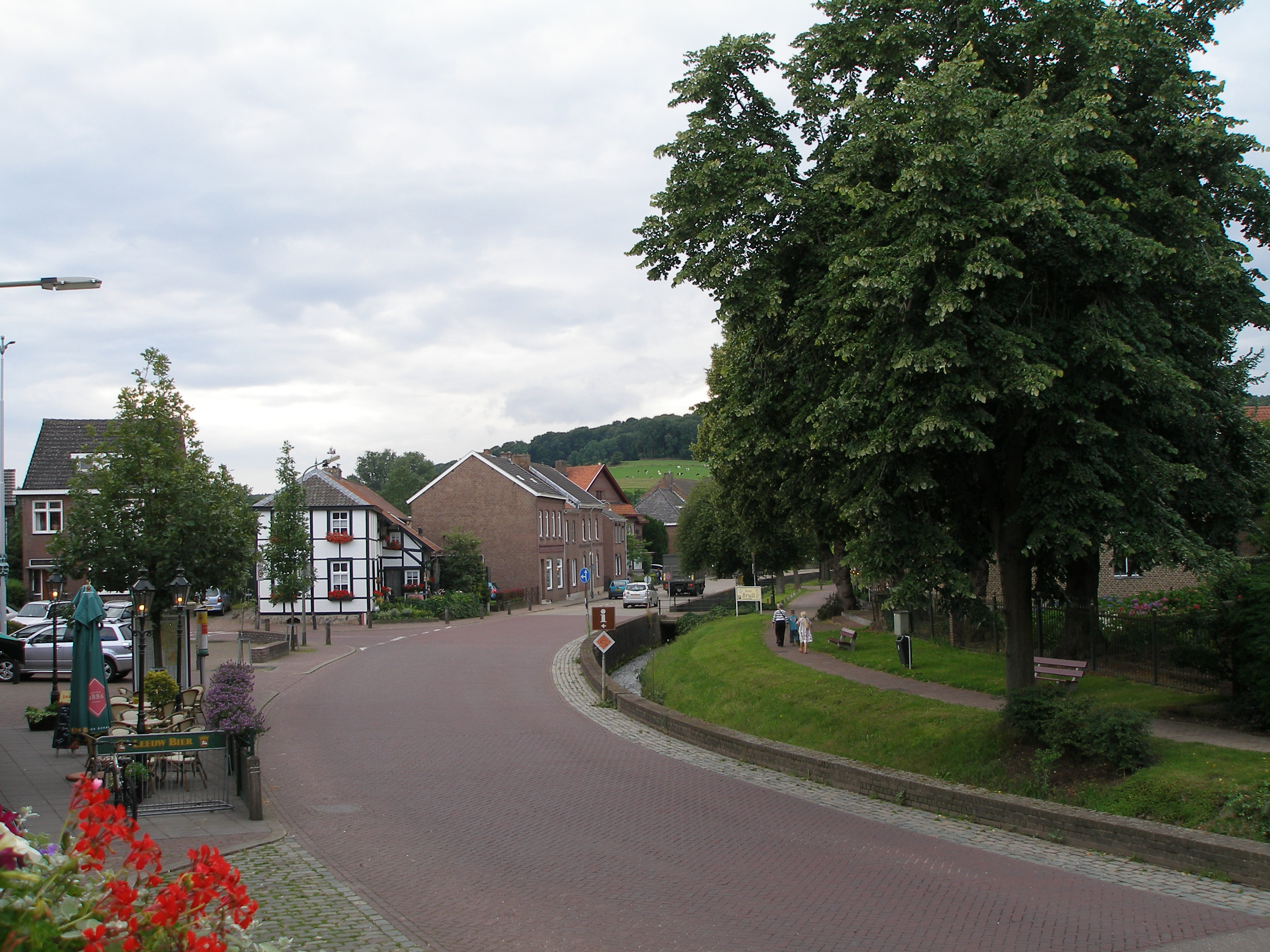
- The centre of Mechelen

- Location in the Netherlands Location in the province of Limburg in the Netherlands
- Coordinates: 50°47′47″N 5°55′30″E
- Country: Netherlands
- Province: Limburg
- Municipality: Gulpen-Wittem

Area
  - Total: 9.74 km^{2} (3.76 sq mi)
- Elevation: 116 m (381 ft)

Population (2021)
  - Total: 1,485
  - Density: 152/km^{2} (395/sq mi)
- Time zone: UTC+1 (CET)
  - Summer (DST): UTC+2 (CEST)
- Postal code: 6280-6281
- Dialing code: 043

Mechelen (Dutch pronunciation: [ˈmɛxələ(n)]; Limburgish: Mechele [ˈmæxələ]) is a town in the Dutch province of Limburg. It is a part of the municipality of Gulpen-Wittem, and lies about 13 km south of Heerlen.

== History ==
The village was first mentioned in 1133 as "de Mechluns", and means "mighty place". It was sometimes called Klein-Mechelen (little Mechelen) to distinguish from Mechelen. Mechelen developed around a large farm which was donated to the Sovereign Military Order of Malta by Henry III, Duke of Limburg. Until 1795, it was a heerlijkheid except for the commandery and a small part of the village which formed an independent enclave.

The Heerenhof is the remainder of the commandery and farm. In 1797, it became private property. In 1986, it became the town hall. The complex has experienced several fires, and the oldest building dates from 1754.

The St John the Baptist Church is a single-aisled church. It burnt down in 1568, and was enlarged between 1810 and 1811 and 1863 to 1867. In 1935, it was redesigned with a larger tower by Joseph Cuypers.

Mechelen was home to 740 people in 1840. Mechelen used to be the capital of the municipality of Wittem. In 1998, it became part of the municipality of Gulpen-Wittem.

== Gallery ==
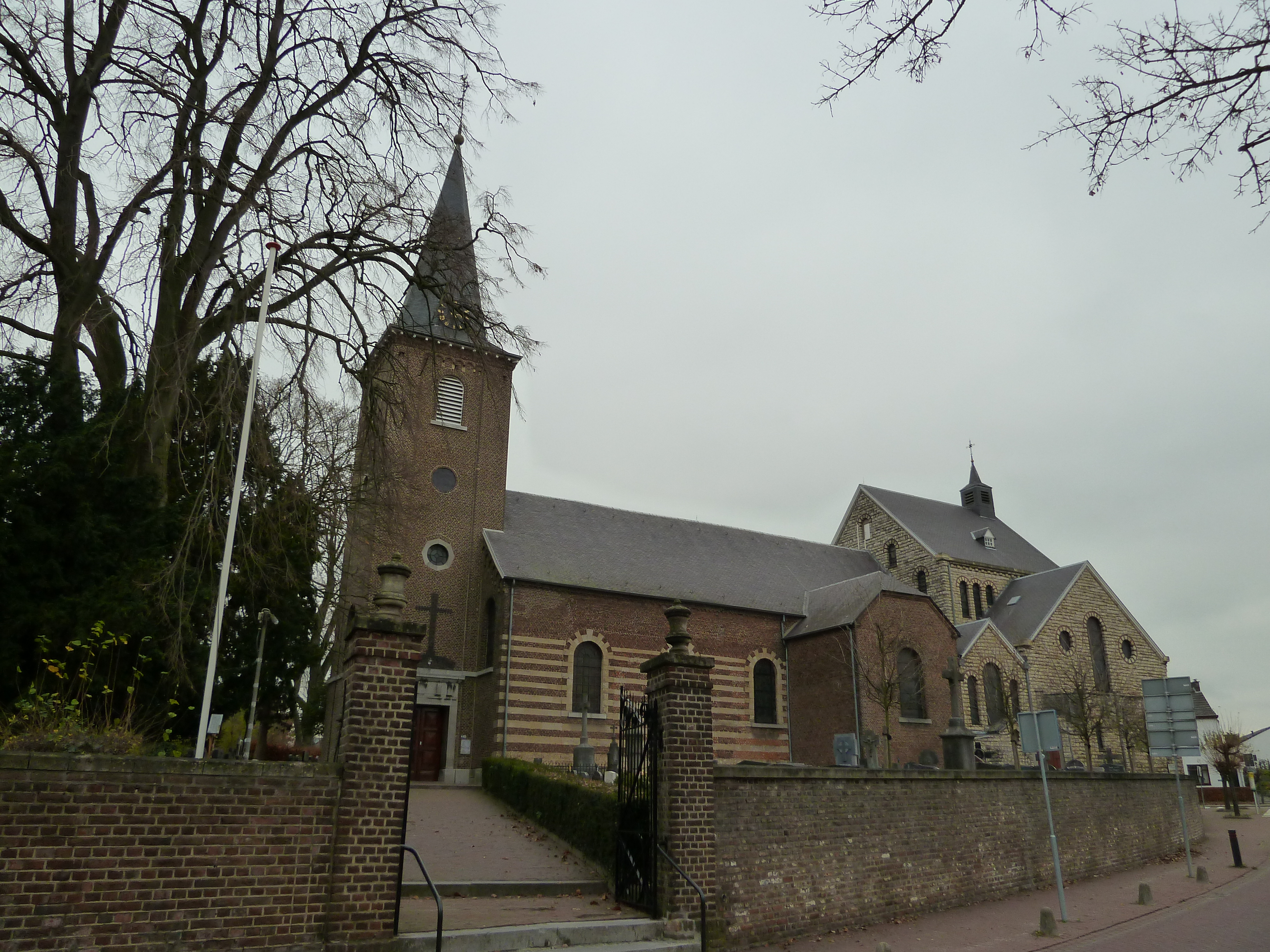
John the Baptist Church

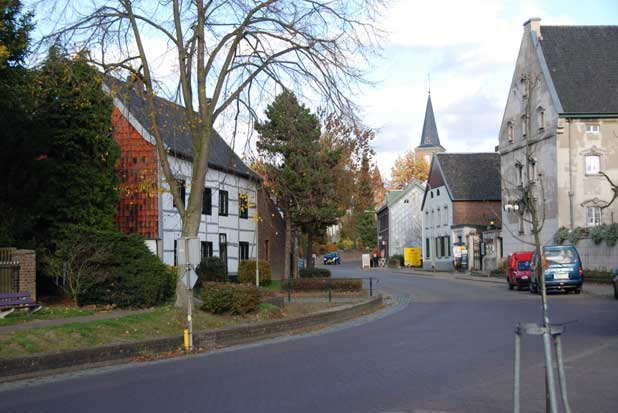
Street of Mechelen

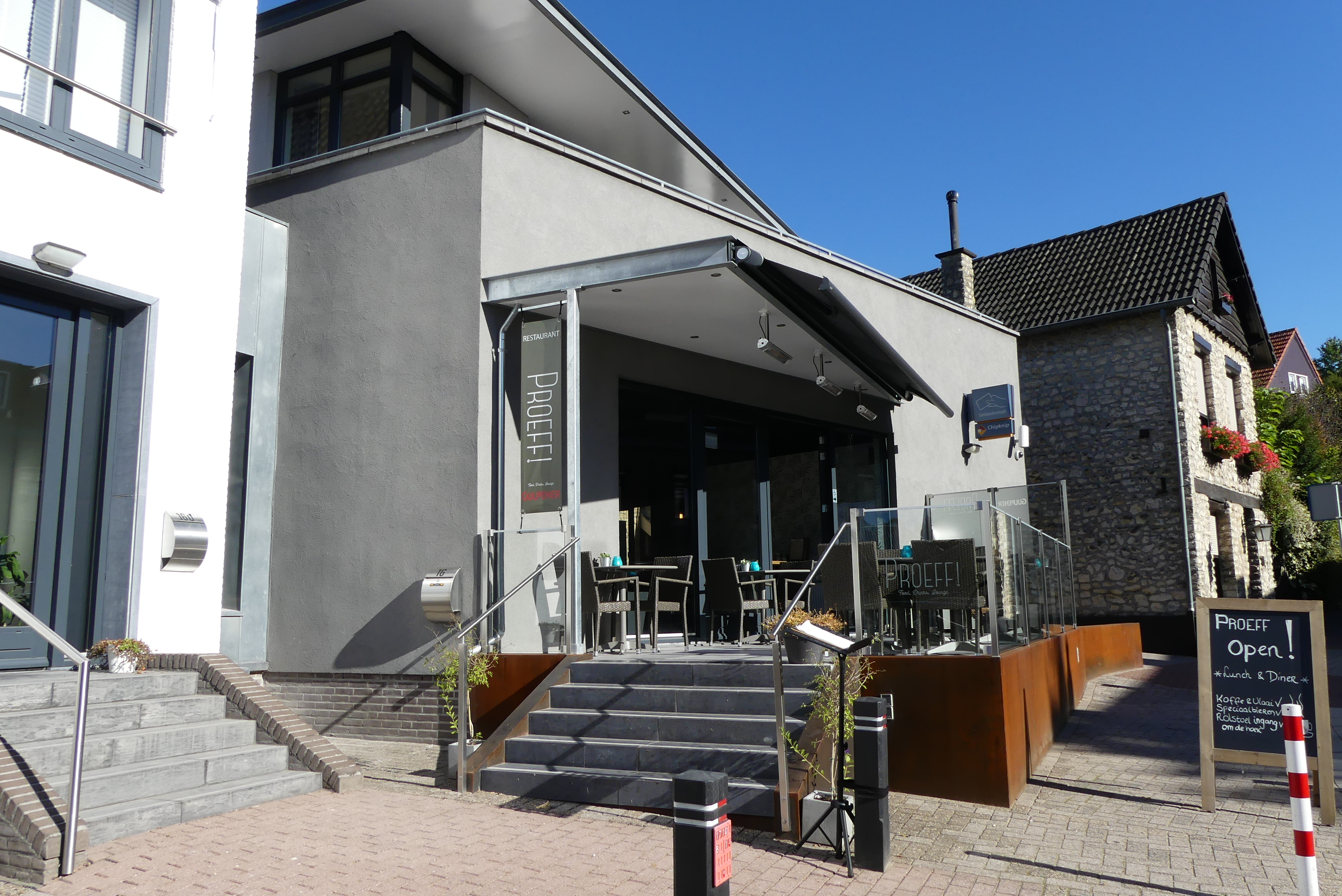
Restaurant in Mechelen

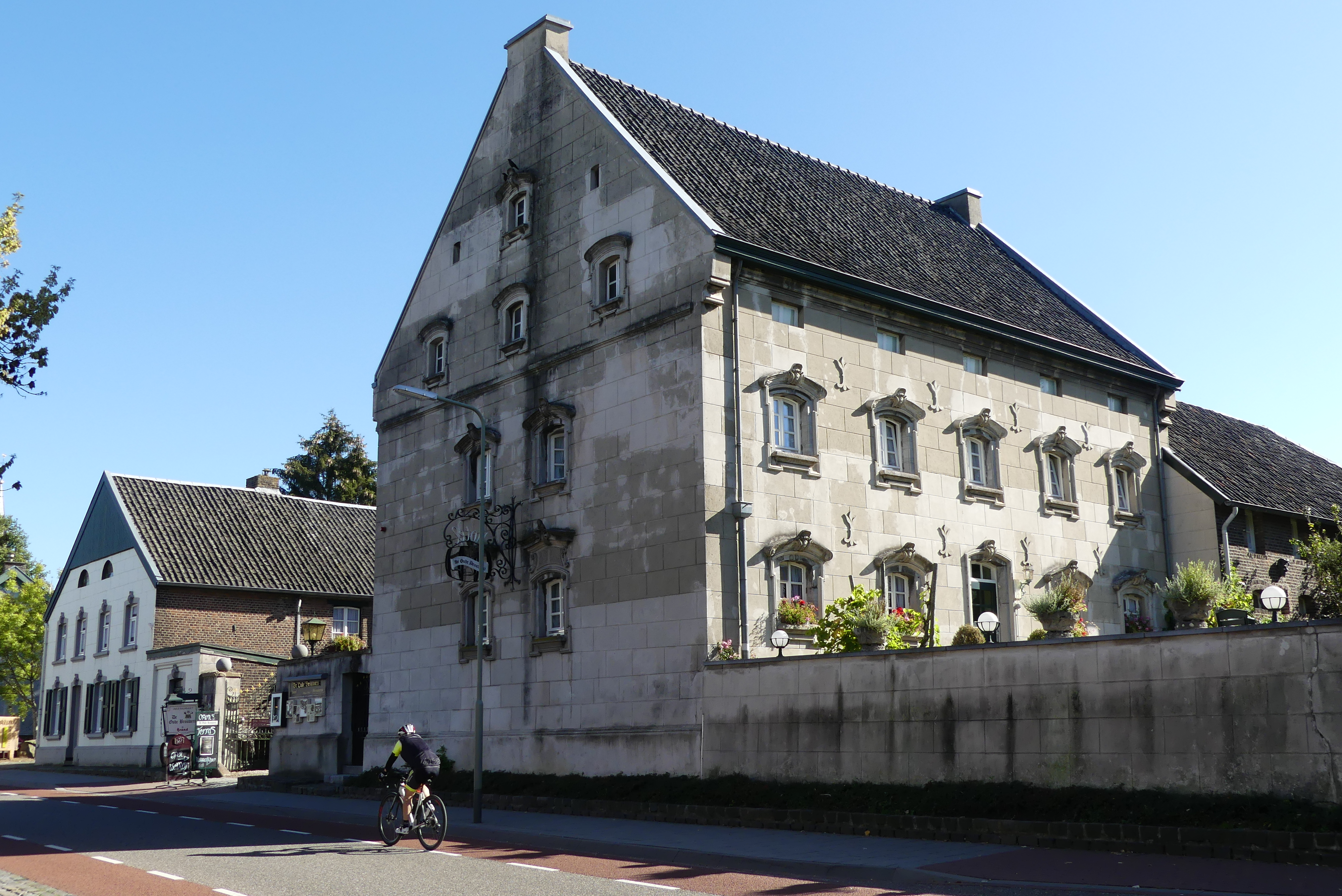
Hotel in a former brewery
