= Ana Santos =

Portuguese politician (born 1967)

Ana Cristina Rodrigues dos Santos Araújo

Member of the Assembly of the Republic
- In office 26 March 2024 – April 2025
- Constituency: Braga

Personal details
- Born: 21 April 1967 (age 59) Portugal
- Party: Social Democratic Party (PSD)
- Occupation: Politician; lawyer

Ana Cristina Rodrigues dos Santos Araújo (born 1967) is a Portuguese politician and lawyer. In the 2024 Portuguese national election she was elected to the Assembly of the Republic as a representative of the Social Democratic Party (PSD).

== Early life and education ==
Santos was born on 21 April 1967. She studied law at the University of Coimbra and became president of the Ordem dos Advogados (Law Society) of Braga and of the association of former students of the University of Coimbra in Braga.

== Political career ==
In the 2024 national election Santos was chosen to be sixth on the list of candidates of the Democratic Alliance (AD) for the Braga constituency. The DA was formed by the PSD, of which she is a member, together with several smaller parties. The AD won eight of the 19 seats available in the constituency and she was duly elected as a deputy in the Assembly. She was not re-elected in the 2025 national elections.

In the parliament she became a member of the Committee on Constitutional Matters, Rights, Liberties and Guarantees and on the Committee of Transparency and Statute of the Deputies.
