= 2023–24 Cyclo-cross Superprestige =

Cyclo-cross competition held in Belgium and the Netherlands

Details
- Location: Belgium
- Races: 8

Champions
- Male individual champion: Eli Iserbyt (BEL) (Pauwels Sauzen–Bingoal)
- Female individual champion: Ceylin del Carmen Alvarado (NED) (Alpecin–Deceuninck)

The 2023–24 Cyclo-cross Superprestige, also known as the Telenet Superprestige for sponsorship reasons, is a season-long cyclo-cross competition held in Belgium.

== Calendar ==
=== Men's competition ===
Date	Race	Winner	Team	Competition leader
22 October	Overijse	Eli Iserbyt (BEL)	Pauwels Sauzen–Bingoal	Eli Iserbyt (BEL)
28 October	Ruddervoorde	Eli Iserbyt (BEL)	Pauwels Sauzen–Bingoal	Eli Iserbyt (BEL)
11 November	Niel	Eli Iserbyt (BEL)	Pauwels Sauzen–Bingoal	Eli Iserbyt (BEL)
18 November	Merksplas	Joris Nieuwenhuis (NED)	Baloise–Trek Lions	Eli Iserbyt (BEL)
2 December	Boom	Joris Nieuwenhuis (NED)	Baloise–Trek Lions	Eli Iserbyt (BEL)
27 December	Heusen-Zolder	Wout van Aert (BEL)	Team Jumbo–Visma	Eli Iserbyt (BEL)
28 December	Diegem	Mathieu van der Poel (NED)	Alpecin–Deceuninck	Eli Iserbyt (BEL)
10 February	Middelkerke	Eli Iserbyt (BEL)	Pauwels Sauzen–Bingoal	Eli Iserbyt (BEL)

=== Women's competition ===
Date	Race	Winner	Team	Competition leader
22 October	Overijse	Fem van Empel (NED)	Team Jumbo–Visma	Fem van Empel (NED)
28 October	Ruddervoorde	Ceylin del Carmen Alvarado (NED)	Alpecin–Deceuninck	Ceylin del Carmen Alvarado (NED)
11 November	Niel	Ceylin del Carmen Alvarado (NED)	Alpecin–Deceuninck	Ceylin del Carmen Alvarado (NED)
18 November	Merksplas	Ceylin del Carmen Alvarado (NED)	Alpecin–Deceuninck	Ceylin del Carmen Alvarado (NED)
2 December	Boom	Fem van Empel (NED)	Team Jumbo–Visma	Annemarie Worst (NED)
27 December	Heusen-Zolder	Fem van Empel (NED)	Team Jumbo–Visma	Annemarie Worst (NED)
28 December	Diegem	Puck Pieterse (NED)	Fenix–Deceuninck	Ceylin del Carmen Alvarado (NED)
10 February	Middelkerke	Lucinda Brand (NED)	Baloise–Trek Lions	Ceylin del Carmen Alvarado (NED)
