= List of cyclists at the 2016 UCI Cyclo-cross World Championships =

This is a list of all cyclo-cross cyclists who competed at the 2016 UCI Cyclo-cross World Championships in Heusden-Zolder, Belgium from 30 to 31 January 2016. There were for men and women an elite and under-23 race and a men's junior race.

== Men's elite ==
Netherlands

Belgium

Switzerland

- 1. Mathieu van der Poel
- 2. Lars van der Haar
- 3. Corné van Kessel
- 4. Thijs van Amerongen
- 5. David van der Poel
- 6. Stan Godrie
- 7. Niels Wubben
- 8. Lars Boom
- 10. Wout van Aert
- 11. Kevin Pauwels
- 12. Sven Nys
- 13. Laurens Sweeck
- 14. Tom Meeusen
- 15. Michael Vanthourenhout
- 16. Tim Merlier
- 20. Julien Taramarcaz
- 21. Simon Zahner
- 22. Lukas Winterberg
- 23. Severin Sägesser
- 24. Lars Förster

Czech Republic

United States

Slovakia

- 26. Michael Boroš
- 27. Radomír Šimůnek
- 28. Lubomír Petruš
- 29. Matěj Lasák
- 30. Jeremy Powers
- 31. Stephen Hyde
- 32. Travis Livermon
- 33. Allen Krughoff
- 34. Anthony Clark
- 35. Jeremy Durrin
- 36. Yannick Eckmann
- 37. Martin Haring

Canada

Germany

France

- 38. Michael van den Ham
- 39. Jeremy Martin
- 40. Aaron Schooler
- 41. Mark McConnell
- 42. Cameron Jette
- 43. Marcel Meisen
- 44. Philipp Walsleben
- 45. Sascha Weber
- 47. Clément Venturini
- 48. Francis Mourey
- 49. Steve Chainel

Poland

Spain

Japan

- 50. Mariusz Gil
- 51. Javier Ruiz de Larrinaga Ibañez
- 52. Ismael Esteban Aguado
- 53. Yu Takenouchi
- 54. Hikaru Kosaka

Australia

United Kingdom

Denmark

- 55. Chris Jongewaard
- 56. Garry Millburn
- 57. Ian Field
- 58. Liam Killeen
- 59. Jack Clarkson
- 60. David Fletcher
- 61. Kenneth Hansen

Austria

New Zealand

Luxembourg

- 62. Karl Heinz Gollinger
- 63. Philipp Heigl
- 64. Angus Edmond
- 65. Gusty Bausch
- 66. Christian Helmig
- 67. Vincent Dias dos Santos

Sweden

Norway

- 68. Martin Eriksson
- 69. Fredrik Haraldseth

== Women's elite ==
France

Belgium

Netherlands

- 2. Caroline Mani
- 3. Sanne Cant
- 4. Ellen Van Loy
- 5. Jolien Verschueren
- 6. Loes Sels
- 7. Joyce Vanderbeken
- 8. Karen Verhestraeten
- 9. Sophie de Boer
- 10. Sanne van Paassen
- 11. Thalita de Jong
- 12. Sabrina Stultiens

United Kingdom

Czech Republic

United States

- 14. Nikki Harris
- 15. Helen Wyman
- 16. Pavla Havlíková
- 17. Martina Mikulášková
- 18. Katie Compton
- 19. Kaitlin Antonneau
- 20. Amanda Miller
- 21. Crystal Anthony
- 22. Meredith Miller
- 23. Elle Anderson

Italy

Germany

Spain

- 24. Eva Lechner
- 25. Alessia Bulleri
- 27. Elisabeth Brandau
- 28. Aida Nuño Palacio
- 29. Lucia González Blanco

Slovakia

Poland

Luxembourg

- 30. Janka Keseg Števková
- 31. Olga Wasiuk
- 33. Christine Majerus

Canada

Sweden

Argentina

- 34. Mical Dyck
- 35. Asa Maria Erlandsson
- 36. Angelica Edvardsson
- 37. Carolina Gómez

Japan

Australia

Switzerland

- 38. Eri Yonamine
- 39. Lisa Jacobs
- 40. Josie Simpson
- 41. Therese Rhodes
- 42. Natalie Redmond
- 43. Lise-Marie Henzelin

== Men's under-23 ==
Belgium

Netherlands

Czech Republic

- 2. Eli Iserbyt
- 3. Quinten Hermans
- 4. Daan Hoeyberghs
- 5. Daan Soete
- 6. Thijs Aerts
- 7. Nicolas Cleppe
- 8. Yannick Peeters
- 11. Joris Nieuwenhuis
- 12. Martijn Budding
- 13. Sieben Wouters
- 14. Gosse van der Meer
- 15. Maik van der Heijden
- 17. Adam Ťoupalík
- 18. Adrian Šírek
- 19. Stephan Schubert

France

Switzerland

United States

- 20. Clément Russo
- 21. Lucas Dubau
- 22. Joshua Dubau
- 23. Yan Gras
- 24. Mathieu Morichon
- 27. Timon Rüegg
- 28. Johan Jacobs
- 29. Curtis White
- 30. Logan Owen
- 31. Tobin Ortenblad
- 32. Andrew Dillman
- 33. Scott Smith
- 34. Grant Ellwood

United Kingdom

Italy

Spain

- 35. Nicholas Barnes
- 36. Gioele Bertolini
- 37. Nadir Colledani
- 38. Stefano Sala
- 39. Felipe Orts
- 40. Kevin Suárez Fernández

Germany

Poland

Japan

- 41. Felix Drumm
- 42. Max Lindenau
- 43. Yannick Gruner
- 46. Marceli Bogusławski
- 47. Bartosz Mikler
- 48. Toki Sawada

Denmark

Slovakia

Sweden

- 49. Simon Andreassen
- 50. Ondrej Glajza
- 51. Šimon Vozár
- 52. Matej Ulik
- 53. Henrik Jansson
- 54. David Eriksson
- 55. Dennis Wahlqvist

Australia

Canada

Luxembourg

- 56. Christopher Aitken
- 57. Nicholas Smith
- 58. Isaac Niles
- 59. Trevor O'Donnell
- 60. Luc Turchi
- 61. Tom Rees

Ireland

Norway

- 62. David Montgomery
- 63. Ola Jorde

== Women's under-23 ==
France

Belgium

Netherlands

- 2. Juliette Labous
- 3. Maëlle Grossetête
- 4. Évita Muzic
- 5. Femke Van den Driessche
- 6. Laura Verdonschot
- 7. Shana Maes
- 8. Joyce Heyns
- 9. Maud Kaptheijns
- 10. Esmée Oosterman
- 11. Fleur Nagengast
- 12. Lizzy Witlox
- 13. Ceylin Alvarado

United Kingdom

Czech Republic

United States

- 17. Hannah Payton
- 18. Bethany Crumpton
- 19. Evie Richards
- 20. Ffion James
- 21. Alice Barnes
- 23. Nikola Nosková
- 24. Denisa Lukešová
- 25. Denisa Minaříková-Švecová
- 26. Ellen Noble
- 27. Laurel Rathbun
- 28. Allison Arensman
- 29. Hannah Arensman
- 30. Emma Swartz

Italy

Denmark

Spain

- 31. Alice Maria Arzuffi
- 32. Chiara Teocchi
- 33. Sara Casasola
- 34. Francesca Baroni
- 35. Jessica Lambracht
- 36. Alicia González Blanco
- 37. Alba Teruel Ribes

Poland

Luxembourg

Canada

- 38. Rita Malinkiewicz
- 40. Edie Antonia Rees
- 41. Ruby West
- 42. Maggie Coles-Lyster

Austria

Argentina

Japan

- 43. Nadja Heigl
- 44. Sofia Gomez-Villafañe
- 45. Kiyoka Sakaguchi

Australia

Denmark

Switzerland

- 46. Stacey Riedel
- 47. Caroline Bohe
- 48. Sina Frei

Norway

- 49. Tiril Mohr

== Men's junior ==
Denmark

Netherlands

Italy

- 2. Christian Storgaard
- 3. Andreas Lund Andresen
- 4. Carl Sørensen
- 5. Jens Dekker
- 6. Mitch Groot
- 7. Thijs Wolsink
- 8. Marino Noordam
- 9. Thymen Arensman
- 11. Jakob Dorigoni
- 12. Antonio Folcarelli
- 13. Michele Bassani
- 14. Edoardo Xillo
- 15. Andrea Pozzato

United States

Belgium

France

- 17. Gage Hecht
- 18. Spencer Petrov
- 19. Eric Brunner
- 20. Cameron Beard
- 21. Denzel Stephenson
- 22. Michael Owens
- 23. Jappe Jaspers
- 24. Seppe Rombouts
- 25. Toon Vandebosch
- 26. Florian Vermeersch
- 27. Alessio Dhoore
- 31. Tanguy Turgis
- 32. Mickaël Crispin
- 33. Thomas Bonnet
- 34. Matthieu Legrand
- 35. Quentin Navarro

United Kingdom

Spain

Switzerland

- 39. Mark Donovan
- 40. Thomas Pidcock
- 41. Daniel Tulett
- 42. William Gascoyne
- 43. Ben Turner
- 45. Jokin Alberdi
- 46. Iván Feijoo Alberte
- 47. Jofre Cullell Estape
- 48. Richard Brun
- 49. Kevin Kuhn
- 50. Mauro Schmid

Denmark

Czech Republic

Slovakia

- 51. Maximilian Möbis
- 52. Paul Rudolph
- 53. Niklas Markl
- 55. Václav Sirůček
- 56. Jan Gavenda
- 57. Jan Novák
- 58. David Honzák
- 59. David Jarý
- 60. Jan Gajdošík

Canada

Poland

Australia

- 61. Quinton Disera
- 62. Gunnar Holmgren
- 63. Brody Sanderson
- 64. Tomasz Rzeszutek
- 66. Ben Walkerden
- 67. Noah Barrow

Luxembourg

Japan

Sweden

- 68. Michel Ries
- 69. Felix Keiser
- 70. Ken Conter
- 71. Misch Leyder
- 72. Noah Fries
- 74. Hijiri Oda
- 75. Ted Pettersson
- 76. Jack Kok

Hungary

Ireland

Norway

- 77. Gergő Orosz
- 78. Ferenc Szöllősi
- 79. David Conroy
- 80. Håkon Aalrust
