= Austrian National Cyclo-cross Championships =

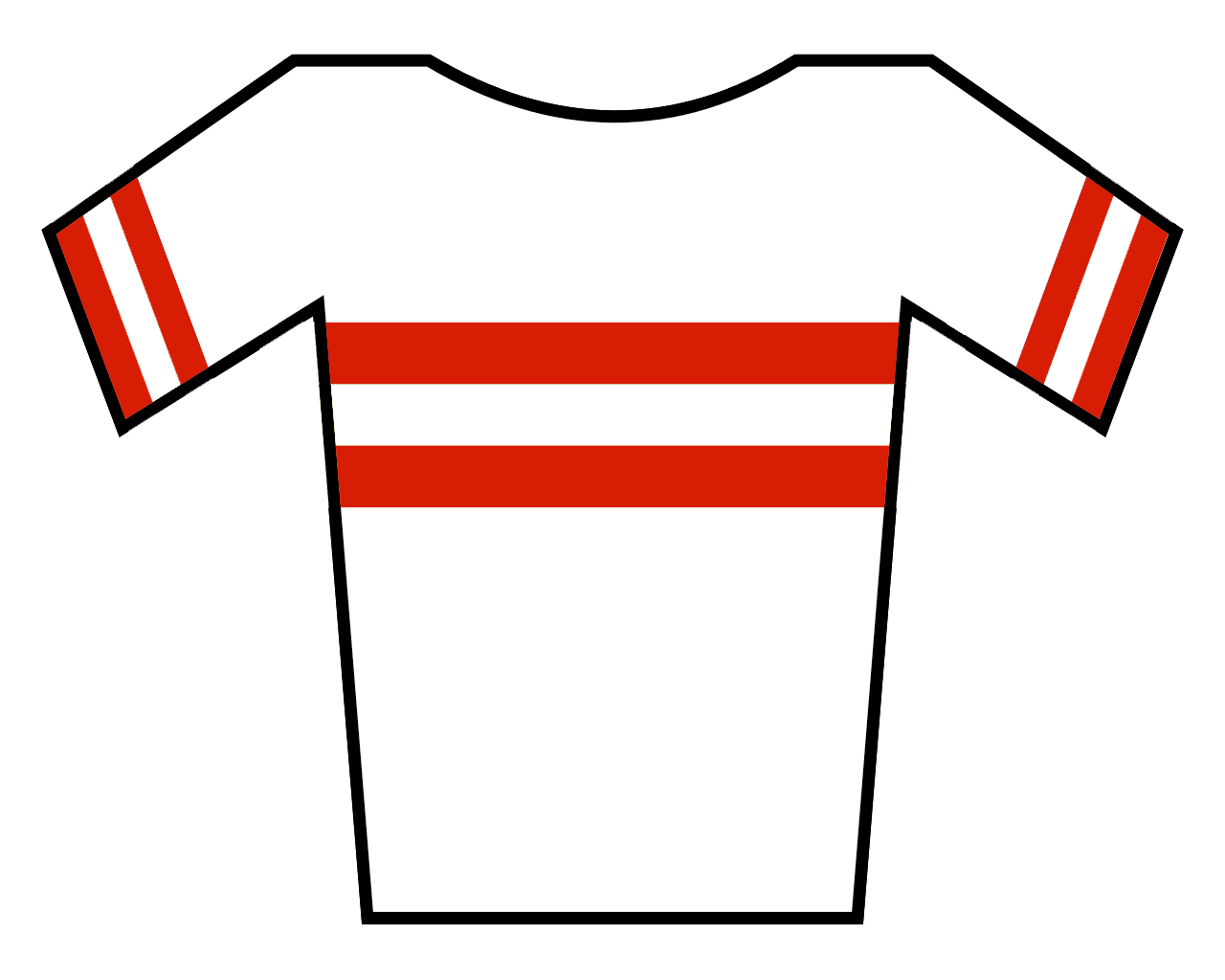
- The champion's jersey

Race details
- Region: Austria
- Discipline: Cyclo-cross
- Type: National championship
- Organiser: Austrian Cycling Federation

History
- First edition: 1962
- Most wins: Peter Presslauer (11 wins)

The Austrian National Cyclo-cross Championships are held annually to decide the Austrian cycling champions in the cyclo-cross discipline, across various categories.

== Men ==
Year	Winner	Second	Third
1962	Josef Coser	Heiner Hofmann	Hans Praschberger
1965	Heiner Hofmann	Roman Hummenberger	Walter Carbonare
1969	Ludwig Kretz	Hermann Hollwert	Peter Mayer
1971	Karl Sinzinger	Ludwig Kretz	Rudolf Kretz
1974	Walter Obersberger	Franz Wiesinger	Stadlmayer
1975	Walter Obersberger	Helmut Roltner	Ed Hauser
1976	Walter Obersberger		Reinhardt Waltensberger
1978	Walter Obersberger	Reinhardt Waltensberger	Christian Glaner
1979	Reinhardt Waltensberger	Christian Glaner	Hermann Mandler
1980	Reinhardt Waltensberger	Peter Höllbacher	Hermann Mandler
1981	Reinhardt Waltensberger	Hermann Mandler	Peter Höllbacher
1982	Reinhardt Waltensberger	Hermann Mandler	Wolfgang Winter
1983	Reinhardt Waltensberger	Hermann Mandler	Christian Glaner
1984	Hermann Mandler	Reinhard Waltensberger	Erich Jagsch
1985	Hermann Mandler	Reinhardt Waltensberger	Albert Hainz
1986	Reinhardt Waltensberger	Albert Hainz	Robert Hutter
1987	Albert Hainz	Christian Deinhammer	Robert Hutter
1988	Albert Hainz	Gerhard Zauner	Christian Deinhammer
1989	Albert Hainz	Martin Aichholzer	Gerhard Zauner
1990	Hermann Mandler	Gerhard Zauner	Martin Aichholzer
1991	Gerhard Zauner	Martin Aichholzer	Gerhard Streit
1992	Dietmar Stari	Gerhard Streit	Gerhard Zauner
1993	Dietmar Stari	Gerhard Streit	Matthias Buxhofer
1994	Dietmar Stari		
1995	Dietmar Stari	Matthias Buxhofer	Thomas Mühlbacher
1996	Dietmar Stari	Matthias Buxhofer	Thomas Mühlbacher
1997	Thomas Mühlbacher	Dietmar Stari	Matthias Buxhofer
1998	Dietmar Stari	Martin Kraler	Christian Mittmasser
1999	Johannes Müller	Dietmar Stari	Peter Presslauer
2000	Gerrit Glomser	Dietmar Stari	Erwin Hammerschmid
2001	Peter Presslauer	Harald Starzengruber	Stefan Nesenson
2002	Peter Presslauer	Stefan Nesenson	Jochen Summer
2003	Peter Presslauer	Gerrit Glomser	Jochen Summer
2004	Peter Presslauer	Harald Starzengruber	Martin Haemmerle
2005	Peter Presslauer	Gerald Hauer	Martin Haemmerle
2006	Peter Presslauer	Harald Starzengruber	Gerrit Glomser
2007	Peter Presslauer	Roland Moerx	Gerald Hauer
2008	Peter Presslauer	Hannes Merzler	Gerrit Glomser
2009	Peter Presslauer	Hannes Metzler	Harald Starzengruber
2010	Peter Presslauer	Roland Moerx	Thomas Mair
2011	Peter Presslauer	Alexander Gehbauer	Roland Moerx
2012	Daniel Geismayr	Alexander Gehbauer	Karl Heinz Gollinger
2013	Daniel Geismayr	Uwe Hochenwarter	Johann Fuchs
2014	Daniel Geismayr	Uwe Hochenwarter	Daniel Federspiel
2015	Alexander Gehbauer	Daniel Geismayr	Karl Heinz Gollinger
2016	Alexander Gehbauer	Thomas Mair	Karl Heinz Gollinger
2017	Gregor Raggl	Daniel Federspiel	Felix Ritzinger
2018	Gregor Raggl	Daniel Federspiel	Philipp Heigl
2019	Gregor Raggl	Felix Ritzinger	Andreas Hofer
2020	Daniel Federspiel	Philipp Heigl	Fabian Costa
2021	Daniel Federspiel	Gregor Raggl	Moran Vermeulen
2022	Daniel Federspiel	Moran Vermeulen	Philipp Heigl
2023	Daniel Federspiel	Philipp Heigl	Jakob Reiter
2024	Gregor Raggl	Lukas Hatz	Dominik Hödlmoser

== Women ==
Year	Winner	Second	Third
2001	Isabella Wieser		
2002	Petra Schörkmayer	Isabella Wieser	Bärbel Jungmeier
2003	Isabella Wieser	Petra Schörkmayer	Petra Pilz
2004	Isabella Wieser	Brigitte Krebs	Karin Wieser
2005	Isabella Wieser	Karin Wieser	Brigitte Krebs
2006	Isabella Wieser	Stephanie Wiedner	Karin Wieser
2007	Stephanie Wiedner	Monica Schach	Elke Riedl
2008	Elke Riedl	Stephanie Wiedner	Ruth Hagen
2009	Elke Riedl	Stephanie Wiedner	Ruth Hagen
2010	Elke Riedl	Silke Schrattenecker	Petra Zehetner
2011	Elke Riedl	Silke Schrattenecker	Stephanie Wiedner
2012	Jacqueline Hahn	Nadja Heigl	Viktoria Zeller
2013	Nadja Heigl	Lisa Mitterbauer	Viktoria Zeller
2014	Nadja Heigl	Silke Schrattenecker	Viktoria Zeller
2015	Nadja Heigl	Silke Schrattenecker	Viktoria Zeller
2016	Nadja Heigl	Lisa Pasteiner	Birgit Braumann
2017	Nadja Heigl	Lisa Pasteiner	Silke Mair
2018	Nadja Heigl	Silke Mair	Lisa Pasteiner
2019	Nadja Heigl	Lisa Pasteiner	Cornelia Holland
2020	Lisa Pasteiner	Nadja Heigl	Cornelia Holland
2021	Nadja Heigl	Cornelia Holland	Fiona Klien
2022	Nadja Heigl	Nora Fischer	Fiona Klien
2023	Nadja Heigl	Silke Schrattenecker	Clara Sommer
2024	Nadja Heigl	Nora Fischer	Silke Schrattenecker

== See also ==
- Austrian National Road Race Championships
- Austrian National Time Trial Championships
