= 2014–15 Cyclo-cross Superprestige =

Details
- Dates: 5 October 2014 – 14 February 2015
- Location: Belgium and Netherlands
- Races: 8

Champions
- Individual champion: Mathieu van der Poel (NED)

The 2014–15 Cyclo-cross Superprestige events and season-long competition took place between 5 October 2014 and 14 February 2015. This was the first season after Niels Albert gave a press-conference that he had to stop competitive cycling because of a heart condition. Meanwhile, Sven Nys was going this season for his 14th title in the Cyclo-cross Superprestige.

== Results ==
Date	Venue	Winner	Second	Third	Classification Leader
5 October	(Netherlands) Gieten	Mathieu van der Poel (NED)	Lars van der Haar (NED)	Sven Nys (BEL)	Mathieu van der Poel (NED)
2 November	(Belgium) Zonhoven	Kevin Pauwels (BEL)	Sven Nys (BEL)	Lars van der Haar (NED)	Sven Nys (BEL)
9 November	(Belgium) Ruddervoorde	Tom Meeusen (BEL)	Mathieu van der Poel (NED)	Klaas Vantornout (BEL)	Mathieu van der Poel (NED)
16 November	(Belgium) Gavere	Klaas Vantornout (BEL)	Kevin Pauwels (BEL)	Sven Nys (BEL)	Sven Nys (BEL)
23 November	(Belgium) Spa-Francorchamps	Kevin Pauwels (BEL)	Lars van der Haar (NED)	Tom Meeusen (BEL)	Kevin Pauwels (BEL)
28 December	(Belgium) Diegem	Mathieu van der Poel (NED)	Tom Meeusen (BEL)	Kevin Pauwels (BEL)	Mathieu van der Poel (NED)
8 February	(Belgium) Hoogstraten	Mathieu van der Poel (NED)	Kevin Pauwels (BEL)	Wout Van Aert (BEL)	Mathieu van der Poel (NED)
15 February	(Belgium) Middelkerke	Kevin Pauwels (BEL)	Mathieu van der Poel (NED)	Wout Van Aert (BEL)	Mathieu van der Poel (NED)

== Season standings ==
In each race, the top 15 riders gain points, going from 15 points for the winner decreasing by one point per position to 1 point for the rider finishing in 15th position. In case of ties in the total score of two or more riders, the following tie breakers exist: most races started, most races won, best result in the last race.

Pos.	Rider	Team	GIE	ZON	RUD	GAV	SPA	DIE	HOO	MID	Points
1	(Netherlands) Mathieu van der Poel	BKCP–Powerplus	1	5	2	6	4	1	1	2	106
2	(Belgium) Kevin Pauwels	Sunweb-Napoleon Games	5	1	7	2	1	3	2	1	105
3	(Netherlands) Lars van der Haar	Giant-Shimano	2	3	5	5	2	4	4	4	99
4	(Belgium) Tom Meeusen	Telenet-Fidea Cycling Team	10	4	1	4	3	2	7	5	92
5	(Belgium) Klaas Vantornout	Sunweb-Napoleon Games	5	6	3	1	6	11	5	8	83
6	(Belgium) Sven Nys	Crelan-AA Drinks	3	2	4	3	8	16	6	7	79
7	(Belgium) Jens Adams	Vastgoedservice-Golden Palace Cycling Team	11	11	6	24	5	6	8	6	59
8	(Netherlands) Corné van Kessel	Telenet-Fidea Cycling Team	7	9	8	12	7	8	Ret	17	45
9	(Germany) Philipp Walsleben	BKCP–Powerplus	14	10	11	7	Ret	7	17	12	35
10	(Belgium) Bart Aernouts	Corendon-Kwadro	13	7	10	10	12	19	DNS	28	28
11	(Netherlands) David van der Poel	BKCP–Powerplus	4	DNS	Ret	11	DNS	5	Ret	20	28
12	(Belgium) Wout Van Aert	Vastgoedservice - Golden Palace Cycling Team	DNS	DNS	DNS	DNS	DNS	DNS	3	3	26
13	(Belgium) Bart Wellens	Telenet-Fidea Cycling Team	12	DNS	12	8	Ret	Ret	Ret	11	21
14	(Belgium) Sven Vanthourenhout	Crelan-AA Drinks	18	13	13	9	Ret	26	11	15	19
15	(Belgium) Gianni Vermeersch	Sunweb-Napoleon Games	21	12	15	15	14	10	Ret	13	17
16	(Belgium) Vincent Baestaens		DNS	DNS	DNS	DNS	DNS	9	13	9	17
17	(Belgium) Jim Aernouts	Sunweb-Napoleon Games	8	18	17	19	11	DNS	16	14	15
18	(Switzerland) Julien Taramarcaz	KwadrO-Stannah	23	14	14	Ret	13	Ret	10	Ret	13
19	(Belgium) Tim Merlier	Sunweb-Napoleon Games	DNS	Ret	18	14	20	Ret	12	10	12
20	(Germany) Marcel Meisen	KwadrO-Stannah	28	21	25	30	15	13	9	18	11
21	(Netherlands) Niels Wubben	Telenet-Fidea Cycling Team	15	8	21	21	18	21	15	27	10
22	(Belgium) Rob Peeters	Vastgoedservice-Golden Palace Cycling Team	17	16	Ret	13	9	DNS	Ret	26	10
23	(Belgium) Joeri Adams	Vastgoedservice-Golden Palace Cycling Team	20	15	9	16	Ret	18	Ret	DNS	8
24	(Belgium) Dieter Vanthourenhout	Sunweb-Napoleon Games	9	Ret	22	Ret	DNS	DNS	19	16	7
25	(Netherlands) Thijs Van Amerongen	Telenet-Fidea	19	19	20	17	10	DNS	21	19	6
26	(Czech Republic) Radomír Šimůnek	KwadrO-Stannah	Ret	Ret	Ret	DNS	Ret	12	36	Ret	4
27	(Netherlands) Twan van den Brand	Orange Babies Cycling Team	29	20	16	23	17	22	14	22	2
28	(Czech Republic) Martin Bína		Ret	DNS	DNS	DNS	DNS	14	Ret	30	2
29	(Belgium) Patrick Gaudy	Team Barracuda	DNS	25	24	18	24	15	Ret	24	1
	(Netherlands) Patrick van Leeuwen	Orange Babies Cycling Team	25	23	28	25	21	31	26	31	0
	(Netherlands) Gert-Jan Bosman	Orange Babies Cycling Team	DNS	22	19	27	Ret	23	18	21	0
	(Belgium) Niels Koyen		30	28	32	DNS	DNS	32	31	37	0
	(Czech Republic) Lubomír Petruš		DNS	DNS	Ret	29	Ret	24	30	Ret	0
	(Belgium) Kenneth Van Compernolle		DNS	DNS	29	26	DNS	30	20	23	0
	(Belgium) Hendrik Sweeck	KwadrO-Stannah	31	26	30	Ret	DNS	DNS	DNS	Ret	0
	(Belgium) Jan Denuwelaere	Vastgoedservice-Golden Palace Cycling Team	16	Ret	Ret	DNS	22	20	DNS	DNS	0
	(Czech Republic) Michael Boros		DNS	DNS	23	DNS	26	17	DNS	25	0
	(Belgium) Dave De Cleyn		DNS	24	DNS	DNS	25	DNS	28	32	0
	(Spain) Javier Ruiz de Larrinaga	Lizarte y MMR-Spiuk	DNS	DNS	DNS	28	23	DNS	25	33	0
	(Belgium) Vinnie Braet		24	DNS	Ret	DNS	DNS	DNS	Ret	38	0
	(France) Clément Lhotellerie	Team Peltrax - C.S.Dammarie-lés-Lys	DNS	DNS	DNS	DNS	29	Ret	24	39	0
	(Japan) Yu Takenouchi		DNS	27	27	33	DNS	33	DNS	DNS	0
	(Netherlands) Eddy van IJzendoorn	Team NatuBalans	22	Ret	26	20	DNS	DNS	DNS	DNS	0
	(Belgium) Kevin Van Hoovels	Team3M	DNS	DNS	33	32	DNS	DNS	DNS	40	0
	(Poland) Mariusz Gil		DNS	DNS	DNS	DNS	16	DNS	Ret	Ret	0
	(Germany) Sascha Weber		DNS	DNS	DNS	Ret	Ret	28	DNS	DNS	0
	(Belgium) Bart Hofman	Nodrugs Heroes Flanders	DNS	DNS	DNS	DNS	DNS	DNS	23	29	0
	(Belgium) Wietse Bosmans		Ret	DNS	DNS	DNS	DNS	DNS	DNS	34	0
	(United States) Jonathan Page		DNS	DNS	DNS	DNS	DNS	Ret	DNS	35	0
	(Spain) Aitor Hernández		DNS	DNS	DNS	DNS	DNS	DNS	34	36	0
	(United Kingdom) James Spragg	Team Bergamont Bicycles by BMC	DNS	DNS	DNS	DNS	DNS	DNS	Ret	41	0
	(France) Nicolas Le Besq		DNS	DNS	DNS	DNS	DNS	DNS	37	42	0
	(United Kingdom) Luke Gray		DNS	DNS	DNS	DNS	DNS	DNS	Ret	43	0
	(Belgium) Kevin Cant		26	DNS	DNS	DNS	DNS	DNS	27	DNS	0
	(Germany) Yannick Mayer		DNS	DNS	DNS	Ret	DNS	35	DNS	DNS	0
	(Czech Republic) Michal Malik		35	DNS	DNS	DNS	DNS	38	DNS	DNS	0
	(Canada) Mark McConnell		DNS	DNS	DNS	DNS	31	Ret	DNS	DNS	0
	(Denmark) Ole Quast		Ret	DNS	DNS	DNS	27	DNS	DNS	DNS	0
	(United Kingdom) Ian Field		DNS	17	DNS	22	DNS	DNS	DNS	DNS	0
	(Netherlands) Bart Barkuis		33	29	DNS	DNS	DNS	DNS	DNS	DNS	0
	(United Kingdom) Bruce Dalton		DNS	DNS	DNS	DNS	DNS	DNS	DNS	44	0
	(Netherlands) Micki Van Empel	Kdl Cycling Team	DNS	DNS	DNS	DNS	DNS	DNS	22	DNS	0
	(Switzerland) Severin Sagesser		DNS	DNS	DNS	DNS	DNS	DNS	29	DNS	0
	(France) Yoann Corbihan		DNS	DNS	DNS	DNS	DNS	DNS	32	DNS	0
	(Belgium) Tom Van Den Bosch	Hargroves Cycles Race Team	DNS	DNS	DNS	DNS	DNS	DNS	33	DNS	0
	(Spain) Iñigo Gomez Elorriaga		DNS	DNS	DNS	DNS	DNS	DNS	35	DNS	0
	(Spain) Jon Gomez Elorriaga		DNS	DNS	DNS	DNS	DNS	DNS	Ret	DNS	0
	(France) David Menut		DNS	DNS	DNS	DNS	DNS	25	DNS	DNS	0
	(Belgium) Ben Berden		DNS	DNS	DNS	DNS	DNS	27	DNS	DNS	0
	(Denmark) Kenneth Hansen		DNS	DNS	DNS	DNS	DNS	29	DNS	DNS	0
	(Czech Republic) Emil Hekele		DNS	DNS	DNS	DNS	DNS	34	DNS	DNS	0
	(Italy) Bryan Falashi		DNS	DNS	DNS	DNS	DNS	36	DNS	DNS	0
	(United States) Robert Marion		DNS	DNS	DNS	DNS	DNS	37	DNS	DNS	0
	(New Zealand) Angus Edmond		DNS	DNS	DNS	DNS	DNS	39	DNS	DNS	0
	(Australia) Garry Milburn		DNS	DNS	DNS	DNS	DNS	40	DNS	DNS	0
	(Switzerland) Fabian Obrist		DNS	DNS	DNS	DNS	DNS	41	DNS	DNS	0
	(Germany) Ulrich Theobald		DNS	DNS	DNS	DNS	DNS	42	DNS	DNS	0
	(Spain) Ramon Sagues		DNS	DNS	DNS	DNS	DNS	43	DNS	DNS	0
	(United Kingdom) Robert Wardell		DNS	DNS	DNS	DNS	DNS	44	DNS	DNS	0
	(Australia) Paul Redenbach		DNS	DNS	DNS	DNS	DNS	45	DNS	DNS	0
	(France) Christophe Cavazzana		DNS	DNS	DNS	DNS	DNS	46	DNS	DNS	0
	(Spain) Arnau Rota		DNS	DNS	DNS	DNS	DNS	47	DNS	DNS	0
	(France) Flavien Dassonville		DNS	DNS	DNS	DNS	DNS	Ret	DNS	DNS	0
	(Czech Republic) Tomáš Paprstka		DNS	DNS	DNS	DNS	19	DNS	DNS	DNS	0
	(Spain) Josep Betalu		DNS	DNS	DNS	DNS	28	DNS	DNS	DNS	0
	(United States) Stephen Hyde		DNS	DNS	DNS	DNS	30	DNS	DNS	DNS	0
	(Canada) Aaron Schooler		DNS	DNS	DNS	DNS	30	DNS	DNS	DNS	0
	(Canada) Cameron Jette		DNS	DNS	DNS	DNS	32	DNS	DNS	DNS	0
	(Belgium) Dany Lacroix		DNS	DNS	DNS	DNS	Ret	DNS	DNS	DNS	0
	(Spain) Asier Arregui		DNS	DNS	DNS	31	DNS	DNS	DNS	DNS	0
	(Spain) Asier Urdaibai		DNS	DNS	DNS	34	DNS	DNS	DNS	DNS	0
	(Spain) Josu Arregi	LeitzMtb-Asmazank	DNS	DNS	DNS	35	DNS	DNS	DNS	DNS	0
	(Spain) Alain Mendijur		DNS	DNS	DNS	Ret	DNS	DNS	DNS	DNS	0
	(Belgium) Stijn Huys		DNS	DNS	31	DNS	DNS	DNS	DNS	DNS	0
	(France) Denis Flahaut	Veranclassic-Doltcini	DNS	DNS	Ret	DNS	DNS	DNS	DNS	DNS	0
	(Netherlands) Tijmen Eising		27	DNS	DNS	DNS	DNS	DNS	DNS	DNS	0
	(Czech Republic) Vladimir Kyzivat		32	DNS	DNS	DNS	DNS	DNS	DNS	DNS	0
	(Czech Republic) Filip Eberl		34	DNS	DNS	DNS	DNS	DNS	DNS	DNS	0
Pos.	Rider	Team	GIE	ZON	RUD	GAV	SPA	DIE	HOO	MID	Points
