= 2013–14 Cyclo-cross Superprestige =

Details
- Dates: 27 October 2013 – 15 February 2014
- Location: Belgium and Netherlands
- Races: 8

Champions
- Individual champion: Sven Nys (BEL)

The 2013–14 Cyclo-cross Superprestige events and season-long competition took place between 27 October 2013 and 15 February 2014. Sven Nys won his 13th Superprestige, overtaking Niels Albert in the final race of the season.

== Results ==
Date	Venue	Winner	Second	Third	Classification Leader
27 October	(Belgium) Ruddervoorde	Klaas Vantornout (BEL)	Sven Nys (BEL)	Tom Meeusen (BEL)	Klaas Vantornout (BEL)
3 November	(Belgium) Zonhoven	Sven Nys (BEL)	Niels Albert (BEL)	Klaas Vantornout (BEL)	Sven Nys (BEL)
10 November	(Belgium) Hamme-Zogge	Niels Albert (BEL)	Sven Nys (BEL)	Philipp Walsleben (GER)	Sven Nys (BEL)
17 November	(Belgium) Gavere	Sven Nys (BEL)	Philipp Walsleben (GER)	Klaas Vantornout (BEL)	Sven Nys (BEL)
24 November	(Netherlands) Gieten	Niels Albert (BEL)	Lars van der Haar (NED)	Tom Meeusen (BEL)	Niels Albert (BEL)
29 December	(Belgium) Diegem	Sven Nys (BEL)	Tom Meeusen (BEL)	Niels Albert (BEL)	Niels Albert (BEL)
9 February	(Belgium) Hoogstraten	Sven Nys (BEL)	Klaas Vantornout (BEL)	Niels Albert (BEL)	Niels Albert (BEL)
15 February	(Belgium) Middelkerke	Tom Meeusen (BEL)	Kevin Pauwels (BEL)	Sven Nys (BEL)	Sven Nys (BEL)

== Season standings ==
In each race, the top 15 riders gain points, going from 15 points for the winner decreasing by one point per position to 1 point for the rider finishing in 15th position. In case of ties in the total score of two or more riders, the following tie breakers exist: most races started, most races won, best result in the last race.

Pos.	Rider	Team	RUD	ZON	HAM	GAV	GIE	DIE	HOO	MID	Points
1	(Belgium) Sven Nys	Crelan-KDL	2	1	2	1	Ret	1	1	3	101
2	(Belgium) Niels Albert	BKCP–Powerplus	5	2	1	5	1	3	3	7	101
3	(Belgium) Tom Meeusen	Telenet-Fidea	3	7	Ret	7	3	2	5	1	84
4	(Belgium) Klaas Vantornout	Sunweb-Napoleon Games	1	3	6	3	9	Ret	2	5	83
5	(Germany) Philipp Walsleben	BKCP–Powerplus	12	6	3	2	4	8	7	9	77
6	(Netherlands) Lars van der Haar	Rabobank-Giant	4	4	11	6	2	6	Ret	4	75
7	(Belgium) Kevin Pauwels	Sunweb-Napoleon Games	10	10	7	9	6	Ret	11	2	57
8	(Belgium) Rob Peeters	Telenet-Fidea	8	Ret	8	4	10	7	6	22	53
9	(Netherlands) Thijs van Amerongen	AA Drink	7	Ret	10	8	12	DNS	4	6	49
10	(Belgium) Bart Aernouts	AA Drink	6	5	12	Ret	8	DNS	Ret	19	33
11	(Germany) Marcel Meisen	KwadrO-Stannah	9	15	15	19	5	9	Ret	17	27
12	(Netherlands) Niels Wubben	Rabobank-Giant	21	9	9	10	13	12	22	20	27
13	(Switzerland) Julien Taramarcaz	BMC Offroad Team	19	11	5	11	14	Ret	18	14	25
14	(Belgium) Jim Aernouts	Sunweb-Napoleon Games	18	Ret	13	Ret	18	10	9	10	22
15	(Czech Republic) Martin Bína	KwadrO-Stannah	16	Ret	Ret	22	7	5	14	27	22
16	(Belgium) Wietse Bosmans	BKCP–Powerplus	15	8	4	Ret	DNS	DNS	Ret	Ret	21
17	(Belgium) Joeri Adams	Telenet-Fidea	14	13	17	16	Ret	11	12	11	19
18	(Belgium) Dieter Vanthourenhout	BKCP–Powerplus	17	12	Ret	21	11	16	Ret	8	17
19	(Belgium) Sven Vanthourenhout	Crelan-KDL	13	22	19	15	20	25	10	12	14
20	(Czech Republic) Zdeněk Štybar	Omega Pharma–Quick-Step	DNS	DNS	DNS	DNS	DNS	4	DNS	DNS	12
21	(Netherlands) Corné Van Kessel	Telenet-Fidea	DNS	17	DNS	DNS	Ret	DNS	8	13	11
22	(Netherlands) Twan van den Brand	Orange Babies Cycling Team	11	Ret	18	18	15	14	17	26	8
23	(Belgium) Bart Wellens	Telenet-Fidea	Ret	DNS	DNS	13	24	13	DNS	DNS	6
24	(Czech Republic) Lubomir Petrus	BKCP–Powerplus	20	19	21	12	Ret	DNS	Ret	Ret	4
25	(Netherlands) Micki van Empel	Crelan-KDL	Ret	26	14	DNS	17	15	20	24	3
26	(United States) Jonathan Page	FUJI/SPY	DNS	DNS	DNS	25	DNS	Ret	13	16	3
27	(Spain) Aitor Hernández	Specialized Garmar	DNS	DNS	DNS	14	DNS	DNS	29	DNS	2
28	(United Kingdom) Ian Field	Hargroves Cycles Race Team	DNS	14	DNS	23	DNS	DNS	DNS	DNS	2
29	(Netherlands) Patrick van Leeuwen	Orange Babies Cycling Team	23	24	DNS	DNS	21	21	15	Ret	1
30	(Belgium) Vinnie Braet	Sunweb-Napoleon Games	DNS	DNS	DNS	DNS	23	DNS	19	15	1
	(Belgium) Kenneth Van Compernolle	DNCS/PRO 12 Cycling Team	24	20	22	27	25	18	16	21	0
	(Belgium) Davy Commeyne	Accent Jobs–Wanty	26	28	23	Ret	28	20	25	28	0
	(Poland) Mariusz Gil	KwadrO-Stannah	22	18	16	26	19	22	21	30	0
	(Czech Republic) Radomír Šimůnek	KwadrO-Stannah	DNS	31	20	Ret	Ret	Ret	Ret	Ret	0
	(Belgium) Niels Koyen	DNCS/PRO 12 Cycling Team	29	29	25	DNS	DNS	28	30	31	0
	(Belgium) Vincent Baestaens	Crelan-KDL	Ret	30	DNS	DNS	27	DNS	23	23	0
	(Belgium) Kevin Cant	Primator Cycling Team	27	25	24	DNS	DNS	DNS	31	29	0
	(Netherlands) Eddy van IJzendoorn	36 Cycling	DNS	DNS	DNS	DNS	26	Ret	Ret	18	0
	(Netherlands) Thijs Al	AA Drink	DNS	16	Ret	DNS	16	DNS	DNS	25	0
	(Spain) Iñigo Gómez	CD Cyclista Lurra	31	DNS	DNS	DNS	DNS	DNS	36	34	0
	(Spain) Jon Gómez	CD Cyclista Lurra	33	DNS	DNS	DNS	DNS	DNS	35	Ret	0
	(Belgium) Patrick Gaudy	Blancs Gilets-Barracuda	DNS	21	DNS	Ret	DNS	17	DNS	DNS	0
	(New Zealand) Angus Edmond	Stevens Malteni	DNS	33	28	DNS	34	DNS	DNS	DNS	0
	(United Kingdom) James Spragg	Team Bergamont Bicycles	DNS	DNS	27	Ret	39	DNS	DNS	DNS	0
	(Japan) Yu Takenouchi	Colba-Superano Ham	Ret	32	26	DNS	DNS	DNS	DNS	DNS	0
	(France) Nicolas Le Besq		DNS	DNS	DNS	DNS	DNS	DNS	34	32	0
	(Belgium) Pieter Ghyllebert	An Post–Chain Reaction	30	DNS	DNS	DNS	DNS	DNS	DNS	33	0
	(Finland) Teemu Violainen		DNS	DNS	DNS	DNS	DNS	DNS	37	35	0
	(Spain) Javier Ruiz De Larrinaga	Cycling Team	DNS	DNS	DNS	24	DNS	DNS	24	DNS	0
	(Belgium) Stijn Huys	Orange Babies Cycling Team	25	DNS	DNS	DNS	DNS	DNS	28	DNS	0
	(Belgium) Wouter Goosen	Zannata Cycling Team	DNS	Ret	DNS	DNS	DNS	DNS	Ret	DNS	0
	(Belgium) Dave De Cleyn	Team Thielemans-Van Cauter	DNS	23	DNS	DNS	DNS	19	DNS	DNS	0
	(Denmark) Kenneth Hansen	CX Denemarken	DNS	DNS	DNS	DNS	31	24	DNS	DNS	0
	(Germany) Yannick Mayer	Team Baier Landshut	DNS	DNS	DNS	28	DNS	29	DNS	DNS	0
	(Germany) Christoph Ambroziak	RSC 1984 Betzdorf	DNS	DNS	DNS	29	DNS	32	DNS	DNS	0
	(Serbia) Ivan Jovanović	DNCS/PRO 12 Cycling Team	DNS	DNS	29	30	DNS	DNS	DNS	DNS	0
	(Belgium) Kevin Eeckhout	Coolens CT	Ret	27	DNS	DNS	DNS	DNS	DNS	DNS	0
	(Australia) Nick Both		DNS	DNS	DNS	DNS	DNS	DNS	DNS	36	0
	(United States) Jeremy Powers	Rapha-FOCUS	DNS	DNS	DNS	DNS	DNS	DNS	26	DNS	0
	(Belgium) Bart Hofman		DNS	DNS	DNS	DNS	DNS	DNS	27	DNS	0
	(Canada) Aaron Schooler		DNS	DNS	DNS	DNS	DNS	DNS	32	DNS	0
	(Belgium) Bart Verschueren		DNS	DNS	DNS	DNS	DNS	DNS	33	DNS	0
	(Slovakia) Robert Gavenda	Dukla Trenčín-Trek	DNS	DNS	DNS	DNS	DNS	23	DNS	DNS	0
	(Slovakia) Martin Haring	CK Banská Bystrica	DNS	DNS	DNS	DNS	DNS	26	DNS	DNS	0
	(Luxembourg) Christian Helmig	Differdange–Losch	DNS	DNS	DNS	DNS	DNS	27	DNS	DNS	0
	(Belgium) Ingmar Uytdewilligen	Melbotech Prorace	DNS	DNS	DNS	DNS	DNS	30	DNS	DNS	0
	(New Zealand) Alex Revell	New Zealand	DNS	DNS	DNS	DNS	DNS	31	DNS	DNS	0
	(France) Christophe Cavazzana	ES Seynod	DNS	DNS	DNS	DNS	DNS	33	DNS	DNS	0
	(Germany) Sascha Weber	Differdange–Losch	DNS	DNS	DNS	DNS	DNS	Ret	DNS	DNS	0
	(Czech Republic) Ondřej Bambula	ČEZ Cyklo Team Tábor	DNS	DNS	DNS	DNS	22	DNS	DNS	DNS	0
	(Netherlands) Bart Barkhuis	AWC Assen-Meteoor-Roden	DNS	DNS	DNS	DNS	29	DNS	DNS	DNS	0
	(Germany) Markus Schulte-Lünzum	Focus XC-tteam	DNS	DNS	DNS	DNS	30	DNS	DNS	DNS	0
	(Czech Republic) Emil Hekele	Stevens Bikes-Emilo Sport	DNS	DNS	DNS	DNS	32	DNS	DNS	DNS	0
	(Sweden) Fredrik Edin	CX Zweden	DNS	DNS	DNS	DNS	33	DNS	DNS	DNS	0
	(Netherlands) Niels Luisman	Hardenberger WSV	DNS	DNS	DNS	DNS	35	DNS	DNS	DNS	0
	(Netherlands) Rik van IJzendoorn	NatuBalans	DNS	DNS	DNS	DNS	36	DNS	DNS	DNS	0
	(Germany) Tim Rieckmann	BOC Racing Team	DNS	DNS	DNS	DNS	37	DNS	DNS	DNS	0
	(Germany) Vladi Riha	VC Vegesack	DNS	DNS	DNS	DNS	38	DNS	DNS	DNS	0
	(Germany) Sebastian Sattler	BOC Racing Team	DNS	DNS	DNS	DNS	40	DNS	DNS	DNS	0
	(Netherlands) Mitchell Huenders	Ruiter Dakkapellen	DNS	DNS	DNS	DNS	Ret	DNS	DNS	DNS	0
	(Spain) Egoitz Murgoitio	Hirumet Taldea Abadino CDC	DNS	DNS	DNS	17	DNS	DNS	DNS	DNS	0
	(Spain) Michel Vuelta	Nestor Martin	DNS	DNS	DNS	Ret	DNS	DNS	DNS	DNS	0
	(France) Arnaud Jouffroy	Telenet-Fidea	28	DNS	DNS	DNS	DNS	DNS	DNS	DNS	0
	(Belgium) Edwin De Wit	WC De Rupelspurters Boom	32	DNS	DNS	DNS	DNS	DNS	DNS	DNS	0
Pos.	Rider	Team	RUD	ZON	HAM	GAV	GIE	DIE	HOO	MID	Points
