= National Cyclo-cross Championships =

National governing bodies hold National Cyclo-cross Championships on an annual basis. The winner is crowned national cyclo-cross champion and wears the national cycling jersey for his/her nation in races in the same category as it was won in. This means, for example, that the winner of the Men's Under-23 category cannot wear his national champion's jersey in a Men's Elite race. Most countries' national championships are held on the second weekend in January, a fortnight before the UCI Cyclo-cross World Championships.

== Current champions ==
=== Men ===
Country	Elite	Under 23	Junior	Date
Albania	Olsian Velia	–	Habib Llana	January 11, 2025
Australia	Max Hobson	Jacob Turner	Campbell McConnell	August 17, 2024
Austria	Lukas Hatz	Dominik Hödlmoser	Valentin Hofer	January 12, 2025
Belgium	Thibau Nys	Aaron Dockx	Arthur Van den Boer	January 12, 2025
Canada	Ian Ackert	Mika Comaniuk	Emilien Belzile	November 16, 2024
Chile	Patricio Farias	Benjamin Cornejo	Luciano Quiñones	September 7, 2024
(Czech Republic) Czechia	Michael Boroš	–	Kryštof Bažant	January 11, 2025
Denmark	Daniel Weis	–	Oskar Koudal	January 12, 2025
Estonia	Madis Mihkels	–	Sebastian Suppi	October 26, 2024
Finland	Antti-Jussi Juntunen	–	Niko Terho	October 26, 2024
France	Clément Venturini	Léo Bisiaux	Florian Fery	January 12, 2025
Germany	Marcel Meisen	Fabian Eder	Benedikt Benz	January 12, 2025
(United Kingdom) Great Britain	Cameron Mason	Ben Chilton	Oscar Amey	January 12, 2025
Greece	Alexandros Athanasiadis	–	Andreas Stamatopoulos	January 26, 2025
Hungary	Barnabás Vas	–	Benedek Berencsi	January 12, 2025
(Republic of Ireland) Ireland	Dean Harvey	–	Conor Murphy	January 12, 2025
Italy	Gioele Bertolini	Stefano Viezzi	Patrik Pezzo Rosola	January 12, 2025
Japan	Hijiri Oda	Shingen Yunoki	Koshi Narita	December 15, 2024
Lithuania	Venantas Lašinis	Aironas Gerdauskas	Martynas Medelinskas	November 10, 2024
Luxembourg	Loïc Bettendorff	Mathieu Kockelmann	Jonah Flammang-Lies	January 12, 2025
Netherlands	Tibor del Grosso	Tibor del Grosso	Michiel Mouris	January 12, 2025
New Zealand	Craig Oliver	–	Fletcher Adams	August 10, 2024
Norway	Mats Tubaas Glende	–	Sindre Orhom-Lønseth	November 10, 2024
Poland	Marek Konwa	–	Kacper Mizuro	January 12, 2025
Portugal	Rafael Sousa	João Fonseca	Gonçalo Costa	January 12, 2025
Romania	Jozsef-Attila Malnasi	–	Mihai-Bogdan Brinza	January 12, 2025
Slovakia	Matej Ulík	–	Michal Sichta	November 23, 2024
Slovenia	Mihael Štajnar	–	Luka Maksimović	December 26, 2024
Spain	Felipe Orts	Miguel Rodríguez	Benjamin Noval	January 12, 2025
Sweden	Filip Mard	–	Vilmer Ekman	November 24, 2024
Switzerland	Kevin Kuhn	Finn Treudler	Lewin Iten	January 12, 2025
United States	Andrew Strohmeyer	Henry Coote	Garrett Beshore	December 14, 2024

=== Women ===
Country	Elite	Under 23	Junior	Date
Albania	Nelia Kabetaj	–	–	January 11, 2025
Australia	Izzy Flint	Zoe Davison	Madeleine Wasserbaech	August 17, 2024
Austria	Nadja Heigl	Nora Fischer	–	January 12, 2025
Belgium	Marion Norbert-Riberolle	Sterre Vervloet	Sanne Laurijssen	January 11, 2025
Canada	Isabella Holmgren	Marin Lowe	Rafaelle Carrier	November 16, 2024
Chile	Maria Fernanda Castro	Ivonne Risco	Florencia Monsalvez	September 7, 2024
(Czech Republic) Czechia	Kristýna Zemanová	–	Lucie Grohová	January 11, 2025
Denmark	Caroline Bohé	–	Mille Foldager	January 12, 2025
Estonia	Mari-Liis Mõttus	–	Maria Jürisaar	October 26, 2024
Finland	Noora Kanerva	–	Lotte Borremans	October 26, 2024
France	Amandine Fouquenet	Célia Gery	Lise Revol	January 12, 2025
Germany	Elisabeth Brandau	Sina van Thiel	Klara Dworatzek	January 12, 2025
(United Kingdom) Great Britain	Xan Crees	Cat Ferguson	Zoe Roche	January 12, 2025
Greece	Eleftheria Giachou	–	Eleni Kaskani	January 26, 2025
Hungary	Regina Bruchner	–	Málna Mudra	January 12, 2025
(Republic of Ireland) Ireland	Esther Wong	–	–	January 12, 2025
Italy	Carlotta Borello	Valentina Corvi	Elisa Ferri	January 12, 2025
Japan	Akari Kobayashi	–	Nanami Ishikawa	December 15, 2024
Lithuania	Gabija Jonaitytė	–	–	November 10, 2024
Luxembourg	Marie Schreiber	Liv Wenzel	Kylie Bintz	January 12, 2025
Netherlands	Puck Pieterse	Leonie Bentveld	Noï Moes	January 12, 2025
New Zealand	Josie Wilcox	–	Millie Junge	August 10, 2024
Norway	Oda Laforce	–	Ida Østbye Støvern	November 10, 2024
Poland	Antonina Bialek	–	Marysia Ambrożkiewicz	January 12, 2025
Portugal	Beatriz Guerra	–	–	January 12, 2025
Romania	Wendy Bunea	–	–	January 12, 2025
Slovakia	Viktória Chladoňová	–	–	November 23, 2024
Slovenia	–	–	Eva Terpin	December 26, 2024
Spain	Sofia Rodríguez	Marta Beti	Lorena Patiño	January 12, 2025
Sweden	Caroline Andersson	–	Elinore Nilsson	November 24, 2024
Switzerland	Rebekka Estermann	Jana Glaus	Anja Grossmann	January 12, 2025
United States	Vida Lopez de San Roman	Katherine Sarkisov	Lidia Cusack	December 14, 2024

== See also ==
- Dutch National Cyclo-cross Championships
- United States National Cyclo-cross Championships
- Belgian National Cyclo-cross Championships
- French National Cyclo-cross Championships
- British National Cyclo-cross Championships
- Spanish National Cyclo-cross Championships
- Italian National Cyclo-cross Championships
