= Martin Eriksson =

Martin Eriksson may refer to:

- Martin Eriksson (pole vaulter) (born 1971), Swedish pole vaulter
- Martin Eriksson (cyclist) (born 1992), Swedish male cyclo-cross cyclist
- Martin Eriksson, birth name of E-Type (musician) (born 1965), Swedish eurodance musician

== See also ==
- Martin Ericsson (born 1980), Swedish footballer
