= Lisa Jacobs =

Lisa Jacobs may refer to:

- Lisa Jacobs (actress), British actor
- Lisa Jacobs (cyclist), Australian cyclo-cross cyclist
- Lisa Jacobs (violinist), Dutch violinist
- Lisa Jacobs, part of Jocelyn & Lisa, Canadian musical duo
