= Edvardsson =

Edvardsson is a Swedish surname. Notable people with the surname include:

- Angelica Edvardsson (born 1989), Swedish cyclo-cross cyclist
- David Edvardsson (born 2002), Swedish footballer
- Isabel Edvardsson (born 1982), Swedish dancer
- Jonathan Edvardsson (born 1997), Swedish handball player

== See also ==
- 9055 Edvardsson, a minor planet
