= Natascha den Ouden =

Dutch cyclist (born 1973)

Personal information
- Born: 24 January 1973 (age 53) Galder, Netherlands

Cycling career
- Sport: Cycling
- Current team: AG Insurance–Soudal
- Disciplines: Road cycling; Track cycling; Cyclo-cross
- Role: Rider (retired); Team manager

Professional teams
- 1991–1992: Jamin
- 1995: Amev
- 1997: Grisley

Managerial team
- 2019–: Rogelli–Gyproc–APB

Natascha Knaven-den Ouden (born 1973) is a cyclist, physical therapist and cycling team manager from the Netherlands. Den Ouden is a four time Dutch National Cyclo-cross Champion. In her active days there weren't any international cyclo-cross championships yet. She won silver in the individual pursuit, at the 1989 World Juniors Track Cycling Championships in Moscow. At that tournament she became friends with Servais Knaven, with whom she married and got four cycling daughters: Britt, Senne, Mirre and Fee. They all ride for AG Insurance-NXTG, the development team of which Den Ouden is the owner, co-founder and team manager.

== Women's cycling in development ==
=== Missing international women´s cyclo-cross races ===
The first official Dutch National Cyclo-cross Championships for Women were held in 1988, and Den Ouden was only 14 when she won the silver medal. The women had only one category, which started in the same race as the 15 and 16-year-old boys, but they started one minute later. This meant that the best women had to overtake the slower boys, who didn't want to step aside nor get beaten by a girl. Den Ouden dominated the next championships, and only didn't get gold when she fell twice with a concussion (Gieten, 1991), or didn't compete because she had a torn ankle ligament (1995) or quit crossing (1993). She won her fourth title in 1994, which was the first women-only championships race, with 45 riders.

Den Ouden raced in cyclo-cross as a training for the next road season. She excelled at cyclo-cross when it was still regarded as a men's sports. She regularly requested to participate in men's (junior) crosses, but was denied access. In 1994 she was quoted: 'In Belgium I recently had yet another discussion with an official about women on a cross bicycle. This man said: 'It's way too dangerous to let women ride in the woods.' The Royal Dutch Cycling Union didn't want to organise more than a few women's crosses, because of their low profile, but that's what you get when you don't send invitations and don't promote women's races. The UCI swiftly denied a request to have a demonstration women's race at the 1996 UCI Cyclo-cross World Championships, but they were very interested in organising a silly mixed madison race with famous veterans, and women.

It was the organisation of the UCI World Cup Cyclo-cross Heerlen that launched the first international women's race in October 1995. It was international, because three Great-Britain riders joined the field of 21 Dutch riders. Den Ouden won the 11,5 km race in 30:13, followed by Isla Rowntree (GB) at 1:53 and Dutch Champion Reza Ravenstijn at 2:10. Den Ouden was no longer active by the time that the first World Championships were organised in 2000. The European Championships and international competitions started at an even later date.

=== The first non-national women's road team ===
Competitors in women's cycling races had traditionally been divided into national teams. Olympic Champion Monique Knol was not happy within the Dutch national team and founded her own independent women's road team in 1991, with Den Ouden in its ranks. The intended main sponsor abandoned the project before it started, and then the Dutch chain of candy stores JAMIN stepped in. The first (semi) professional women's cycling team was born.

== Major results ==
=== Cyclo-cross ===
1988
2nd National Cyclo-cross Championships
1989
1st National Cyclo-cross Championships
1990
1st National Cyclo-cross Championships
1991
2nd National Cyclo-cross Championships
1992
1st National Cyclo-cross Championships
1994
1st National Cyclo-cross Championships
1st Zevenbergen
1996
2nd National Cyclo-cross Championships
1997
3rd National Cyclo-cross Championships

=== Road cycling ===
1992
2nd National Time Trial Championships
1993
3rd National Time Trial Championships
1994
3rd National Time Trial Championships
4th Overall GP du Portugal Féminin

1st Stage 2

1995
3rd National Time Trial Championships

=== Track cycling ===
1989
2nd Individual pursuit World Juniors Track Cycling Championships
1990
Junior National Championships

1st individual pursuit
1st Points race

1994
National championships

2nd Individual pursuit
3rd Points race
