= Richard Groenendaal =

Dutch cyclist (born 1971)

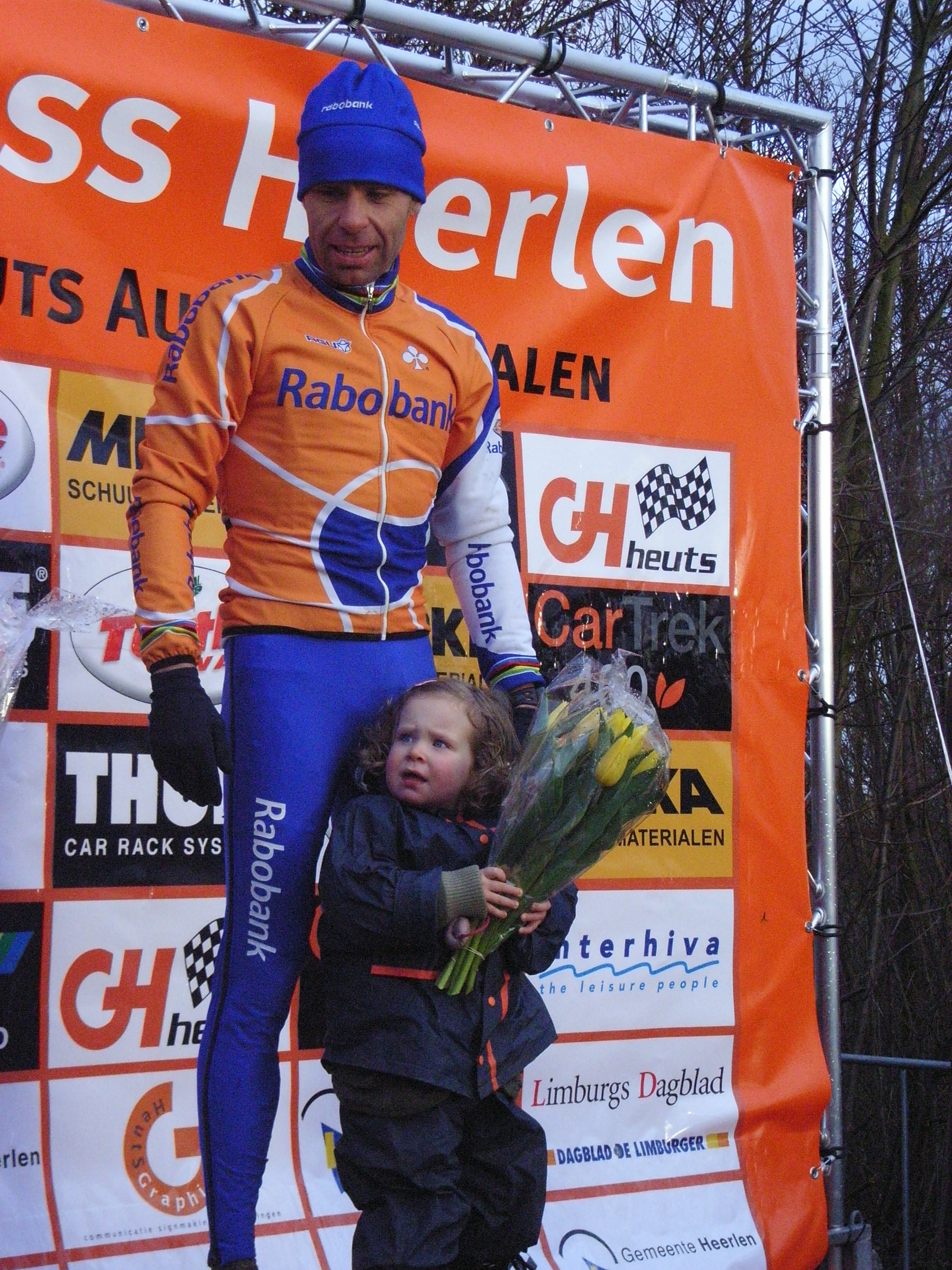

Personal information
- Full name: Richard Marinus Anthonius Groenendaal
- Born: 13 July 1971 (age 55) Den Bosch, Netherlands

Cycling career
- Sport: Cycling
- Discipline: Cyclo-cross

Professional teams
- 1994–1995: Concorde–American Eagle
- 1996–2006: Rabobank
- 2007–2009: AA Drink

Major wins
- Cyclo-cross World Championships (2000) National Championships (1994, 1996, 1998, 2000, 2001, 2003–2005) World Cup (1997–98, 2000–01, 2003–04) 13 individual wins (1996–97—1998–99, 2000–01—2003–04) Superprestige (1997–98, 2000–01)
Medal record
Representing Netherlands
Men's cyclo-cross
World Championships
Gold medal – first place	2000 Sint-Michielsgestel	Elite
Silver medal – second place	1994 Koksijde	Elite
Silver medal – second place	1995 Eschenbach	Elite

Richard Marinus Anthonius Groenendaal (born 13 July 1971) is a Dutch former professional cyclo-cross cyclist. Groenendaal won the UCI Cyclo-cross World Championships in 2000 and the overall titles in the UCI Cyclo-cross World Cup 1997–1998, 2000–2001 and 2003–2004 and in the Cyclo-cross Superprestige in 1997–1998 and 2000–2001.

== Early career ==
Groenendaal's father Reinier was an Elite cyclo-cross cyclist and was Dutch Elite champion in 1985. Groenendaal began to ride as a junior in 1987. He was Dutch Junior champion in 1987–1988 and 1988–89 where he also won the Junior World Cyclo-Cross championships. The following season he joined the Amateur category which he stayed until the 1993–94 season when he turned professional. Early in his career he showed promise as a road rider by finishing in the top ten in the 1992 Tour de l'Avenir, the year he also took part in the Summer Olympics road race. At the start of Groenendaal's career he was often compared to his father Rein and one commentator in Belgium sometimes referred to him as Reintje. However, after two seasons, Groenendaal had stood on more international podiums than his father and the comparisons stopped.

In 1996 Groenendaal joined the newly formed Dutch cycling team Rabobank which he would stay with until the end of the 2006–07 season when he choose to ride for an individual sponsor. Groenendaal's greatest achievements include winning the Cyclo-Cross World Cup in 1998, 2001 and 2004 and becoming Cyclo-Cross World Champion in 2000. Groenendaal attacked during the first lap and was chased by defending cyclo-cross world champion Mario De Clercq who was followed by Groenendaal's Rabobank teammate Sven Nys. Nys would not cooperate in the chase of his commercial teammate and as a result De Clercq never caught Groenendaal enabling Groenendaal to become World Champion. In the following season, Groenendaal dominated cyclo-cross with wins in the Superprestige series and the World Cup as well as being number one UCI ranked rider. Groenendaal also won the Dutch National Cyclo-cross championships. Groenendaal started as a big favourite for the World Championships but suffered a crash during the race and did not recover and as a result lost his Rainbow jersey. In the 2001–02 season, Groenendaal lost the national cyclo-cross jersey to teammate Gerben de Knegt but did win the final World Cup of the season in Heerlen which made him a favourite for the World Championships which were taking place a week later. However, Mario De Clercq won ahead of Nys and Vannoppen. Groenendaal finished fourth and as best non-Belgian. Groenendaal won the first race of the Gazet van Antwerpen trophy of the 2002–03 season with the Koppenbergcross ahead of Nys and Wellens. He also won a World Cup.

For the 2003–04 season, Groenendaal suffered from a knee injury at the start of the season. At the end of the season, he recovered some form and won the Dutch national champions jersey. In an unexpected finale, Groenendaal took the 2003–04 World Cup classification after the final event of the season. Groenendaal won the final world cup race where there were double points on offer in Pijnacker, while teammate and World Cup leader Sven Nys finished further back and lost the lead in the World Cup classification. Groenendaal kept up his form to win the final Gazet van Antwerpen race.

In the 2008 UCI Cyclo-cross World Championships Groenendaal helped Dutch National teammate Lars Boom to launch his attack at the start of the final lap and win the gold medal. Groenendaal finished in twelfth place.

== Major results ==
1988–1989
1st UCI World Junior Championships
1st National Junior Championships
1990–1991
2nd Soestduinen
1991–1992
2nd Sint-Michielsgestel
1992–1993
1st Soestduinen
Superprestige

2nd Valkenswaard

3rd Rambrouch
1993–1994
1st National Championships
1st Telleriarte
2nd UCI World Championships
2nd Steinmaur
Superprestige

3rd Overijse
3rd Westouter-Zillebeke
3rd Harnes

UCI World Cup

3rd Eindhoven

1994–1995
2nd Overall Superprestige

1st Wetzikon
1st Harnes
2nd Diegem
3rd Overijse

1st Sint-Michielsgestel
1st Vossem
1st Azpeitia
1st Telleriarte
1st Soestduinen
1st Zeddam
2nd UCI World Championships
2nd National Championships
Gazet van Antwerpen Trofee

2nd Niel
2nd Oostmalle

UCI World Cup

2nd Loenhout

2nd Koksijde
3rd Surhuisterveen
3rd Steinmaur
1995–1996
1st National Championships
1st Tábor
1st Zeddam
2nd Overall Superprestige

1st Harnes
3rd Asper-Gavere
3rd Milan
3rd Overijse
3rd Sint-Michielsgestel
3rd Wetzikon

2nd Overall UCI World Cup

2nd Wangen
2nd Heerlen
2nd Loenhout
5th Igorre
5th Variano di Basiliano

2nd Surhuisterveen
2nd Praha
3rd Berlin
3rd Soestduinen
1996–1997
2nd Overall UCI World Cup

1st Eschenbach
1st Prata di Pordenone
1st Nommay
3rd Koksijde
4th Heerlen

1st Steinmaur
1st Zürich
1st Soestduinen
1st Vossem
2nd National Championships
3rd Overall Superprestige

1st Asper-Gavere
2nd Overijse
2nd Sint-Michielsgestel
2nd Harnes
3rd Milan

Gazet van Antwerpen Trofee

2nd Kalmthout

2nd Woerden
2nd Loenhout
2nd Surhuisterveen
3rd Fronsac
1997–1998
1st National Championships
1st Overall UCI World Cup

1st Eschenbach
1st Koksijde
1st Heerlen
2nd Solbiate Olona
2nd Pontchâteau
3rd Praha

1st Overall Superprestige

1st Asper-Gavere
1st Sint-Michielsgestel
1st Gieten
1st Overijse
1st Harnes
2nd Silvelle
2nd Milan
2nd Diegem
2nd Wetzikon

Gazet van Antwerpen Trofee

1st Essen
1st Kalmthout
2nd Hoogstraten

1st Hägendorf
1st Steinmaur
1st Zürich
1st Dijon
1st Brouilly
1st Vossem
2nd Tábor
2nd Zeddam
3rd Fronsac
1998–1999
UCI World Cup

1st Eschenbach

1st Praha
1st Zürich
Superprestige

2nd Ruddervoorde
2nd Gieten

Gazet van Antwerpen Trofee

2nd Kalmthout
3rd Essen

2nd Montévrain
2nd Steinsel
3rd Pijnacker
1999–2000
1st UCI World Championships
1st National Championships
2nd Overall Superprestige

1st Asper-Gavere
1st Overijse
1st Diegem
1st Harnes
1st Heerlen
2nd Ruddervoorde
2nd Wetzikon
3rd Gieten
3rd Hoogstraten

2nd Overall UCI World Cup

2nd Safenwil
2nd Leudelange
2nd Nommay
3rd Tábor
3rd Zeddam

1st Hoogerheide
1st Loenhout
1st Pijnacker
1st Zürich
2nd Baal
2nd Steinsel
3rd Harderwijk
3rd Vossem
2000–2001
1st National Championships
1st Overall UCI World Cup

1st Bergamo
1st Leudelange
1st Pontchâteau
2nd Tábor
3rd Zeddam
5th Heusden-Zolder

1st Overall Superprestige

1st Ruddervoorde
1st Sint-Michielsgestel
1st Gieten
2nd Asper-Gavere
2nd Hoogstraten
2nd Harnes

1st Hoogerheide
1st Zonnebeke
1st Heerlen
Gazet van Antwerpen Trofee

2nd Niel
2nd Kalmthout
2nd Essen

2nd Vorselaar
2nd Steinmaur
2nd Contern
2nd Berlin
2nd Vossem
2nd Wetzikon
3rd Koppenberg
3rd Ronse
2001–2002
UCI World Cup

1st Heerlen
1st Vorselaar
3rd Nommay
4th Monopoli
4th Wetzikon
5th Igorre

1st Koksijde
1st Pijnacker
2nd Overall Superprestige

1st Harnes
3rd Asper-Gavere

2nd National Championships
2nd Koppenberg
2nd Surhuisterveen
2nd Huijbergen
Gazet van Antwerpen Trofee

3rd Kalmthout

3rd Vossem
4th UCI World Championships
2002–2003
1st National Championships
UCI World Cup

1st Kalmthout
2nd Liévin
4th Frankfurt

Gazet van Antwerpen Trofee

1st Koppenberg
2nd Loenhout

1st Hofstade
1st Pijnacker
1st Zeddam
1st Woerden
1st Huijbergen
1st Steinmaur
Superprestige

2nd Ruddervoorde
2nd Sint-Michielsgestel

2nd Heerlen
2003–2004
1st National Championships
1st Overall UCI World Cup

1st Pijnacker
2nd Koksijde
2nd Nommay
4th Turin

Gazet van Antwerpen Trofee

1st Oostmalle

2nd Zeddam
3rd Surhuisterveen
3rd Huijbergen
2004–2005
1st National Championships
Gazet van Antwerpen Trofee

1st Niel
2nd Koppenberg
2nd Lille
3rd Essen

1st Surhuisterveen
1st Heerlen
UCI World Cup

2nd Pijnacker
2nd Lanarvily
4th Wetzikon
5th Hofstade

2nd Overall Superprestige

2nd Ruddervoorde
3rd Gieten
3rd Vorselaar

2nd Sint-Niklaas
3rd Eeklo
2005–2006
Superprestige

1st Gieten

1st Surhuisterveen
1st Woerden
UCI World Cup

2nd Pijnacker
2nd Wetzikon
3rd Hooglede-Gits

Gazet van Antwerpen Trofee

2nd Essen

2nd National Championships
2nd Hasselt
2nd Neerpelt
2nd Heerlen
2nd Wachtebeke
2nd Lebbeke
3rd Sint-Niklaas
3rd Harderwijk
2006–2007
1st Surhuisterveen
2nd National Championships
Superprestige

2nd Hoogstraten
3rd Sint-Michielsgestel

3rd Overall Gazet van Antwerpen Trofee

2nd Koppenberg
2nd Niel
2nd Lille

2nd Wachtebeke
2nd Heerlen
3rd Sint-Niklaas
3rd Hamburg I
3rd Hamburg II
UCI World Cup

4th Pijnacker
4th Nommay

2007–2008
2nd Surhuisterveen
2nd Antwerpen
3rd National Championships
3rd Woerden
UCI World Cup

5th Igorre
5th Hoogerheide

2008–2009
3rd National Championships
3rd Sint-Michielsgestel
UCI World Cup

4th Nommay

== See also ==
- List of Dutch Olympic cyclists
