= Wim de Vos =

Dutch cyclist (born 1968)

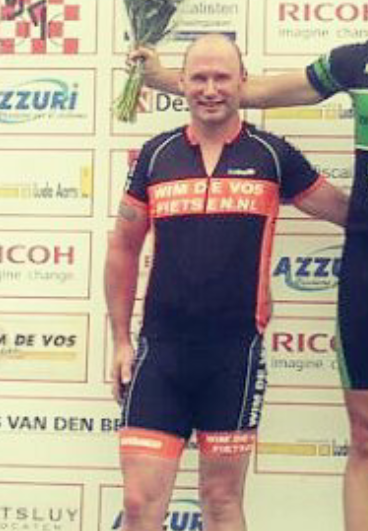

Personal information
- Born: 18 March 1968 (age 58) Tilburg, Netherlands

Cycling career
- Sport: Cycling
- Current team: Retired
- Discipline: Cyclo-cross
- Role: Rider

Professional teams
- 1993: Lacroix
- 1993–1996: Jacob & Partners
- 1996: Espace Card–SEFB
- 1997–2000: VKS–Empella
- 2000–2003: SpaarSelect
- 2003–2004: VKS–Empella
Medal record
Representing Netherlands
Men's cyclo-cross
World Championships
Bronze medal – third place	1993 Corva	Elite race
Bronze medal – third place	1985 Münich	Junior race
Bronze medal – third place	1986 Lembeek	Junior race

Wim de Vos (born 18 March 1968) is a Dutch former professional cyclo-cross cyclist. He notably won the Dutch National Cyclo-cross Championships in 1997 and a bronze medal at the 1993 UCI World Championships.

== Major results ==
=== Cyclo-cross ===
1984–1985
3rd UCI Junior World Championships
1985–1986
3rd UCI Junior World Championships
1992–1993
3rd UCI World Championships
Superprestige

3rd Diegem

1993–1994
Superprestige

2nd Plzeň

3rd Jaarmarktcross Niel
1994–1995
Superprestige

2nd Overijse
3rd Milan

1995–1996
Superprestige

1st Gavere
1st Plzeň

1996–1997
1st National Championships
Superprestige

2nd Diegem
3rd Sint-Michielsgestel

UCI World Cup

3rd Prata di Pordenone

5th UCI World Championships
1997–1998
2nd GP Rouwmoer
1998–1999
2nd National Championships
Superprestige

3rd Sint-Michielsgestel

1999–2000
3rd National Championships
3rd Petange
3rd Hittnau
2000–2001
2nd National Championships
3rd Dagmersellen
2001–2002
3rd National Championships

=== MTB ===
1990
1st National XCO Championships
