= Daniel Federspiel =

Austrian cross-country mountain biker

Personal information
- Full name: Daniel Federspiel
- Born: 21 April 1987 (age 39) Imst, Austria

Cycling career
- Sport: Cycling
- Current team: Team Felt–Felbermayr
- Disciplines: Mountain biking; Road; Cyclo-cross
- Role: Rider
- Rider type: Cross-country (Mountain biking)

Professional teams
- 2019–2021: Team Vorarlberg Santic
- 2021–: Team Felbermayr–Simplon Wels

Major wins
- World Championships Cross-country eliminator (2015, 2016)
Medal record
Representing Austria
Men's mountain bike racing
World Championships
Gold medal – first place	2016 Nové Město	Cross-country eliminator
Gold medal – first place	2015 Vallnord	Cross-country eliminator
Silver medal – second place	2013 Pietermaritzburg	Cross-country eliminator
Bronze medal – third place	2012 Saalfelden-Leogang	Cross-country eliminator
European Championships
Gold medal – first place	2014	Cross-country eliminator
Gold medal – first place	2013	Cross-country eliminator
Silver medal – second place	2016	Cross-country eliminator
Silver medal – second place	2008	Under-23 cross-country marathon

Daniel Federspiel (born 21 April 1987) is an Austrian cross-country mountain biker, cyclo-cross and road racing cyclist, who currently rides for UCI Continental team Team Felt–Felbermayr. He specialises in the cross-country eliminator event, in which he was world champion in 2015 and 2016. He was also European champion in the cross-country eliminator in 2013 and 2014. He was given the Austrian Cyclist of the Year award in 2016.

== Major results ==
=== Mountain bike ===
2012
3rd UCI World XCE Championships
2013
1st Overall UCI XCE World Cup

1st Albstadt
1st Val di Sole

1st European XCE Championships
2nd UCI World XCE Championships
2014
1st European XCE Championships
3rd Overall UCI XCE World Cup
2015
1st UCI World XCE Championships
2016
1st UCI World XCE Championships
2nd European XCE Championships
2017
2nd European XCE Championships
2018
1st Graz, UCI XCE World Cup
2021
1st National XCE Championships

=== Cyclo-cross ===
2013–2014
3rd National Championships
2016–2017
2nd National Championships
2017–2018
2nd National Championships
2019–2020
1st National Championships
2020–2021
1st National Championships
2021–2022
1st National Championships

=== Road ===
2020
2nd Road race, National Road Championships
2023
3rd International Rhodes GP
