= Huub Harings =

Dutch cyclist born 1939

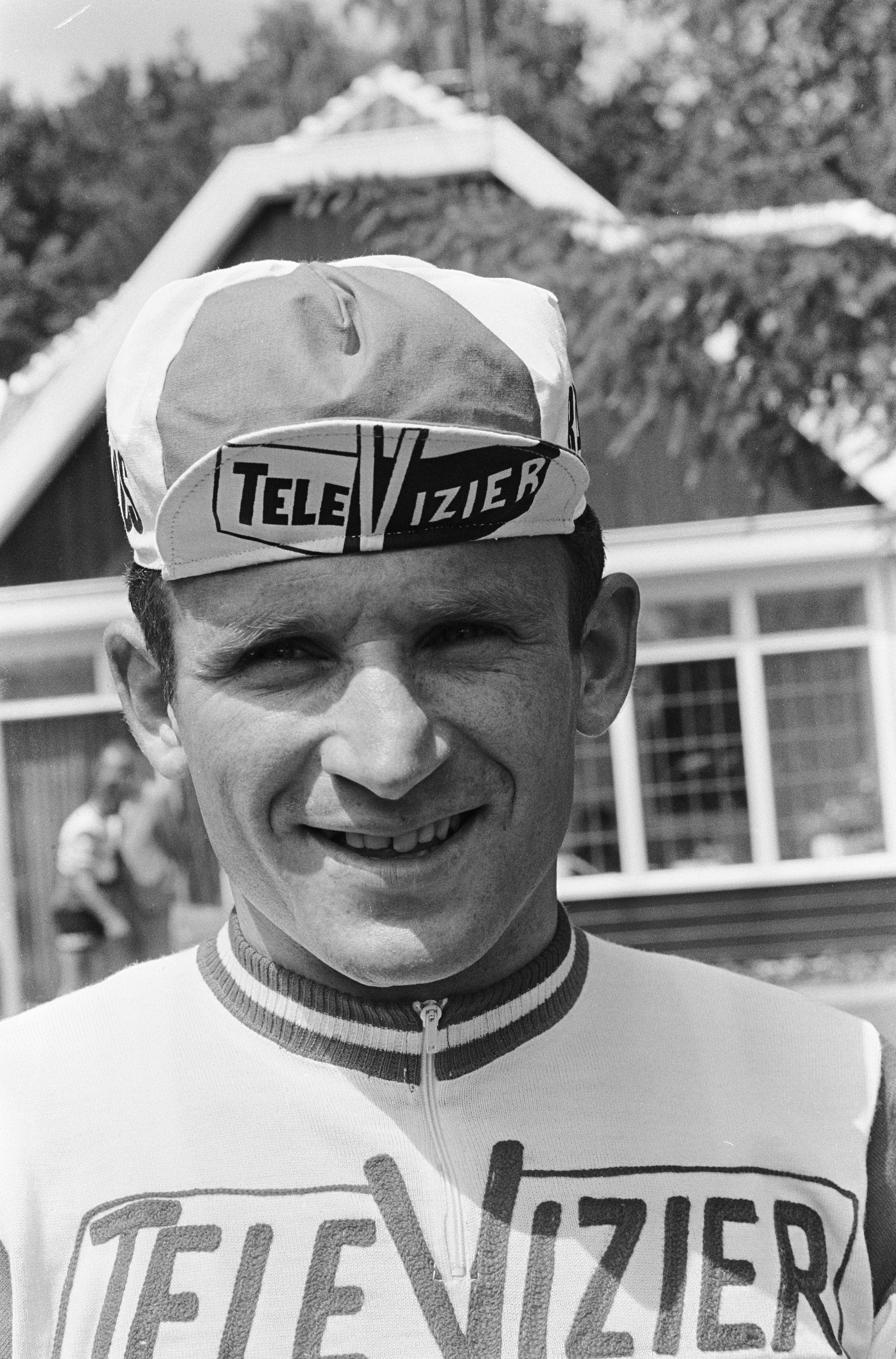

Personal information
- Born: 31 January 1939 (age 87) Scheulder, Eijsden-Margraten, Netherlands

Cycling career
- Sport: Cycling
- Current team: Retired
- Disciplines: Cyclo-cross; Road
- Role: Rider

Professional teams
- 1963–1964: Wiel's–Groene Leeuw
- 1964–1967: Televizier
- 1968–1971: Caballero–Wielersport

Huub Harings (born 31 January 1939) is a Dutch former professional racing cyclist. He rode in four editions of the Tour de France. He also won the Dutch National Cyclo-cross Championships five times: in 1963, 1966, 1967, 1969 and 1970.
