= Garry Millburn =

Australian cyclist

Personal information
- Born: 2 February 1987 (age 39) Melbourne, Australia

Cycling career
- Sport: Cycling
- Discipline: Cyclo-cross
- Role: Rider

Garry Millburn (born 2 February 1987) is an Australian cyclo-cross cyclist. He represented his nation in the men's elite event at the 2016 UCI Cyclo-cross World Championships in Heusden-Zolder.

== Major results ==
2015–2016
3rd National Championships
2016–2017
1st Nobeyama Day 2
2nd National Championships
2017–2018
1st Boulder Day 2
National Series

1st Round 6, Essendon Fields
3rd Round 5, Essendon Fields

2nd National Championships
2nd Takashima City
3rd Nobeyama Day 2
2018–2019
3rd National Championships
3rd Takashima City
2019–2020
2nd Melbourne Day 2
3rd National Championships
2023–2024
3rd National Championships
