= Thomas Mühlbacher =

Austrian cyclist

Personal information
- Born: 11 May 1974 (age 52) Ostermiething, Austria
- Height: 1.80 m (5 ft 11 in)
- Weight: 68 kg (150 lb)

Cycling career
- Sport: Cycling

Professional team
- 1999–2001: Gerolsteiner

Thomas Mühlbacher (born 11 May 1974) is an Austrian cyclist. He competed in the men's individual road race at the 2000 Summer Olympics.
