= Josie Simpson =

Australian cyclo-cross cyclist

Cycling career
- Sport: Cycling
- Discipline: Cyclo-cross
- Role: Rider

Josie Simpson is an Australian female cyclo-cross cyclist. She represented Australia in the women's elite event at the 2016 UCI Cyclo-cross World Championships in Heusden-Zolder.
