= Alexander Gehbauer =

Austrian cross-country mountain biker

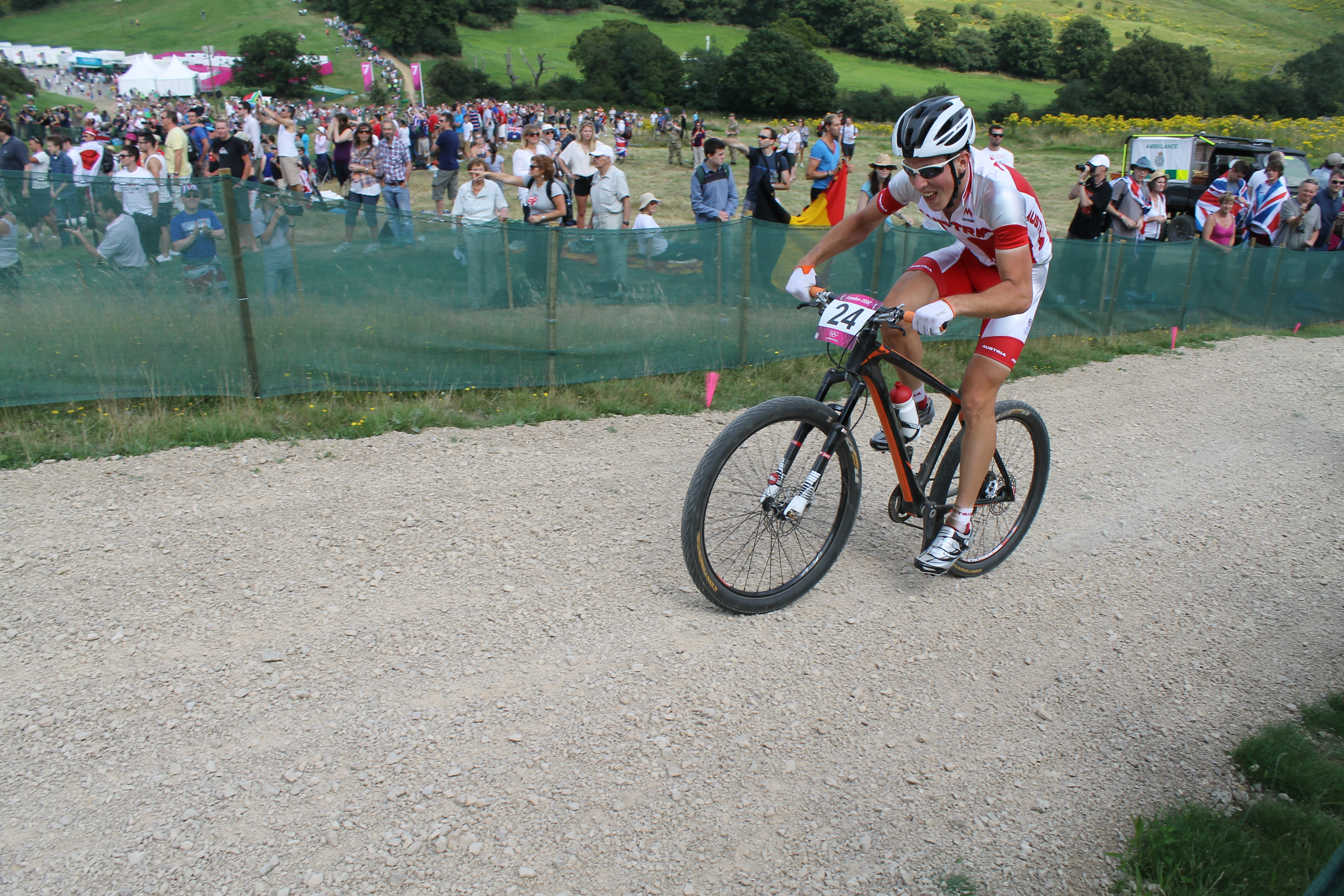
- Gehbauer at the 2012 Summer Olympics

Personal information
- Born: 24 April 1990 (age 36) Bensheim, Austria

Cycling career
- Sport: Cycling
- Disciplines: Mountain bike; Cyclo-cross
- Role: Rider
- Rider type: Cross-country

Alexander Gehbauer (born 24 April 1990) is an Austrian cross-country mountain biker. At the 2012 Summer Olympics, he competed in the Men's cross-country at Hadleigh Farm, finishing in 9th place. At the 2016 Summer Olympics, he failed to finish.

== Major results ==
=== Mountain bike ===
2010
1st National Under-23 XCO Championships
2012
1st National XCO Championships
4th UCI Under-23 XCO World Championships
2013
1st National XCO Championships

=== Cyclo-cross ===
2014–2015
1st National Championships
2015–2016
1st National Championships
