= Dutch National Cyclo-cross Championships =

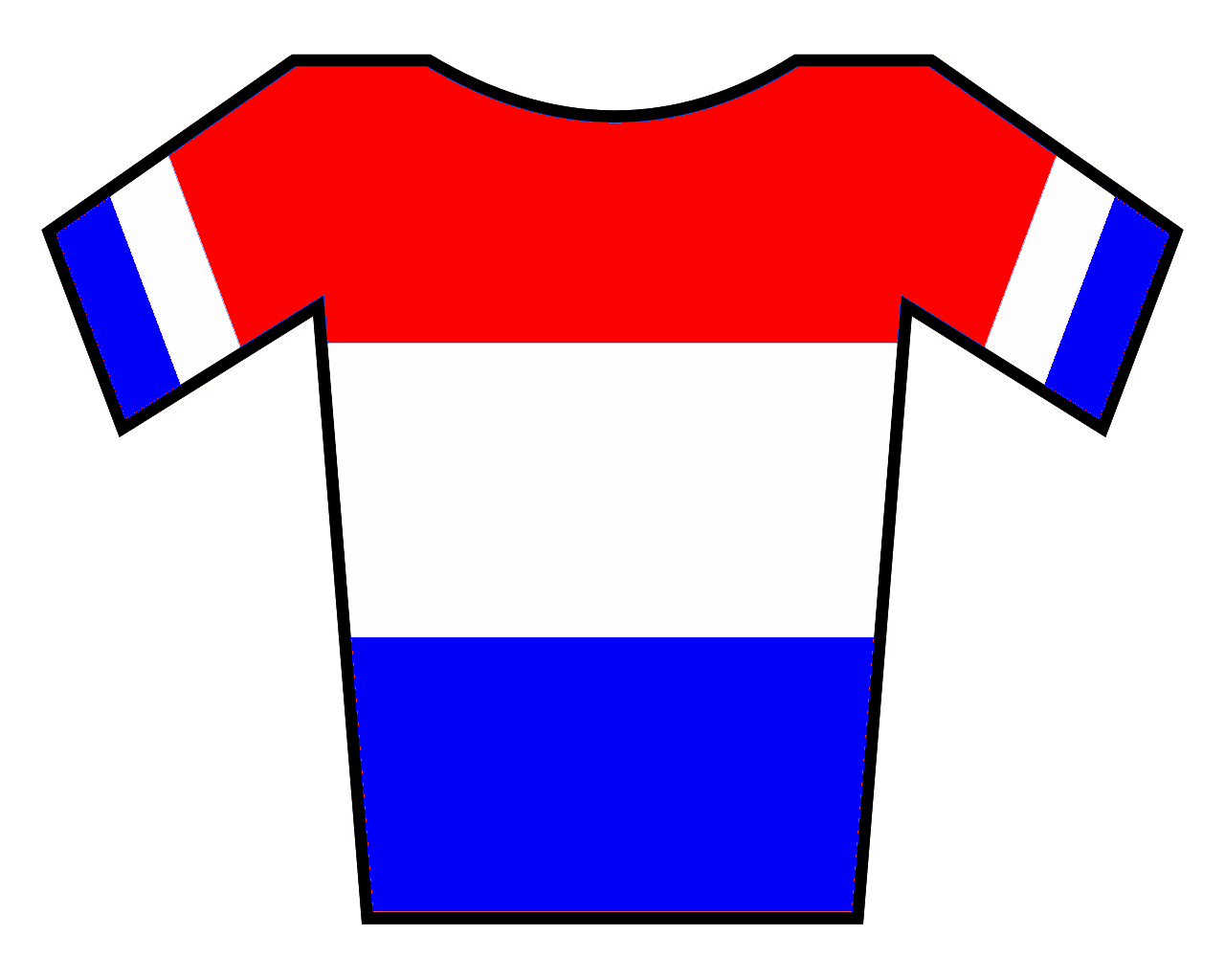
- The champion's jersey

Race details
- Region: Netherlands
- Discipline: Cyclo-cross
- Type: National championship
- Organiser: Royal Dutch Cycling Union

History
- First edition: 1963

The Dutch National Cyclo-cross Championships were first held in 1963 and have been held annually since then by the Royal Dutch Cycling Union. The first women event was held in 1987.

The first races were held as a combination race with both the amateurs and the professionals riding in one event. Recent years the races are run in different classes: Elite, U-23, U-18, Juvenile, Masters and Amateurs.

== Elite Men Results ==
Year	Location	Gold	Silver	Bronze
2026	Huijbergen	Tibor Del Grosso (2/2)	Lars van der Haar	Pim Ronhaar
2025	Oisterwijk	Tibor Del Grosso (1/2)	Pim Ronhaar	Joris Nieuwenhuis
2024	Hoogeveen	Joris Nieuwenhuis	Pim Ronhaar	Lars van der Haar
2023	Zaltbommel	Lars van der Haar (4/4)	Joris Nieuwenhuis	Ryan Kamp
2022	Rucphen	Lars van der Haar (3/4)	Corné van Kessel	Mees Hendrikx
2021	Zaltbommel	not held due to COVID-19		
2020	Rucphen	Mathieu van der Poel (6/6)	Lars van der Haar	Joris Nieuwenhuis
2019	Huijbergen	Mathieu van der Poel (5/6)	Lars van der Haar	Corné van Kessel
2018	Surhuisterveen	Mathieu van der Poel (4/6)	Lars van der Haar	David van der Poel
2017	Sint-Michielsgestel	Mathieu van der Poel (3/6)	Corné van Kessel	Joris Nieuwenhuis
2016	Hellendoorn	Mathieu van der Poel (2/6)	Lars van der Haar	David van der Poel
2015	Veldhoven	Mathieu van der Poel (1/6)	David van der Poel	Lars van der Haar
2014	Gieten	Lars van der Haar (2/4)	Corné van Kessel	Thijs van Amerongen
2013	Hilvarenbeek	Lars van der Haar (1/4)	Lars Boom	Thijs van Amerongen
2012	Huijbergen	Lars Boom (6/6)	Thijs van Amerongen	Niels Wubben
2011	Sint-Michielsgestel	Lars Boom (5/6)	Gerben de Knegt	Eddy van IJzendoorn
2010	Heerlen	Lars Boom (4/6)	Gerben de Knegt	Thijs Al
2009	Huijbergen	Lars Boom (3/6)	Thijs Al	Richard Groenendaal
2008	Sint-Michielsgestel	Lars Boom (2/6)	Thijs Al	Richard Groenendaal
2007	Woerden	Lars Boom (1/6)	Richard Groenendaal	Gerben de Knegt
2006	Huijbergen	Gerben de Knegt (2/2)	Richard Groenendaal	Wilant van Gils
2005	Zeddam	Richard Groenendaal (8/8)	Wilant van Gils	Maarten Nijland
2004	Heerlen	Richard Groenendaal (7/8)	Wilant van Gils	Maarten Nijland
2003	Huijbergen	Richard Groenendaal (6/8)	Gerben de Knegt	Camiel van den Bergh
2002	Zeddam	Gerben de Knegt (1/2)	Richard Groenendaal	Wim de Vos
2001	Pijnacker	Richard Groenendaal (5/8)	Wim de Vos	Gerben de Knegt
2000	Gieten	Richard Groenendaal (4/8)	Adrie van der Poel	Wim de Vos
1999	Heerlen	Adrie van der Poel (6/6)	Wim de Vos	Maarten Nijland
1998	Woerden	Richard Groenendaal (3/8)	Adrie van der Poel	Wim de Vos
1997	Zeddam	Wim de Vos	Richard Groenendaal	Adrie van der Poel
1996	Zwolle	Richard Groenendaal (2/8)	Wim de Vos	Adrie van der Poel
1995	Soestduinen	Adrie van der Poel (5/6)	Richard Groenendaal	Erik Boezewinkel
1994	Sint-Michielsgestel	Richard Groenendaal (1/8)	Henk Baars	Edward Kuyper
1993	Beekse Bergen	Henk Baars	Edward Kuyper	Adrie van der Poel
1992	Valkenswaard	Adrie van der Poel (4/6)	Huub Kools	Henk Baars
1991	Gieten	Adrie van der Poel (3/6)	Henk Baars	Martin Hendriks
1990	Maarn	Adrie van der Poel (2/6)	Rein Groenendaal	Frank van Bakel
1989	Sint-Michielsgestel	Adrie van der Poel (1/6)	Henk Baars	Rein Groenendaal
1988	Hulsberg	Hennie Stamsnijder (9/9)	Adrie van der Poel	Henk Baars
1987	Oldenzaal	Hennie Stamsnijder (8/9)	Huub Kools	Frank van Bakel
1986	Lochem	Hennie Stamsnijder (7/9)	Henk Baars	Frank van Bakel
1985	Gieten	Rein Groenendaal	Hennie Stamsnijder	Adrie van der Poel
1984	Oss	Hennie Stamsnijder (6/9)	Adrie van der Poel	Cees van de Wereld
1983	Hulsberg	Hennie Stamsnijder (5/9)	Adrie van der Poel	Herman Snoeijink
1982	Kijkduin	Hennie Stamsnijder (4/9)	Herman Snoeijink	Cees van de Wereld
1981	Oss	Hennie Stamsnijder (3/9)	Rein Groenendaal	Willy Brouwers
1980	Berg en Dal	Cees van de Wereld	Rein Groenendaal	Hennie Stamsnijder
1979	Gieten	Hennie Stamsnijder (2/9)	Rein Groenendaal	Bennie Meijer
1978	Nieuwkoop	Herman Snoeijink	Hennie Stamsnijder	Cees van der Wereld
1977	Apeldoorn	Hennie Stamsnijder (1/9)	Willy Brouwers	Cees van der Wereld
1976	Cadier en Keer	Willy Brouwers	Gerrit Scheffer	Hennie Stamsnijder
1975	Helvoirt	Gertie Wildeboer (2/2)	Gerrit Scheffer	Willy Brouwers
1974	Valkenswaard	Gerrit Scheffer	Sjaak Spetgens	Willy Brouwers
1973	Beekse Bergen	Cock van der Hulst (2/2)	Gerrit Scheffer	Cees Zoontjens
1972	Sittard	Cees Zoontjens	Cock van der Hulst	Gerrit Scheffer
1971	Apeldoorn	Gertie Wildeboer (1/2)	Jan Spetgens	Huub Harings
1970	Loosduinen	Huub Harings (5/5)	Cock van der Hulst	Gertie Wildeboer
1969	Sibbe	Huub Harings (4/5)	Cor Rutgers	Cock van der Hulst
1968	Wassenaar	Cock van der Hulst (1/2)	Huub Harings	Cor Rutgers
1967	Sibbe	Huub Harings (3/5)	Jan Heesbeen	Chris Looyen
1966	Markelo	Huub Harings (2/5)	Jan van Geest	Cor Rutgers
1965	Soestduinen	Cor Rutgers (2/2)	Cock van der Hulst	Jan van Dijk
1964	Kralingse Bos	Cor Rutgers (1/2)	Huub Harings	Cock van der Hulst
1963	Elsloo	Huub Harings (1/5)	Cor Rutgers	Jan van Geest

== Elite Women Results ==
Year	Location	Gold	Silver	Bronze
2026	Huijbergen	Ceylin del Carmen Alvarado (2/2)	Puck Pieterse	Lucinda Brand
2025	Oisterwijk	Puck Pieterse (2/2)	Ceylin del Carmen Alvarado	Denise Betsema
2024	Hoogeveen	Lucinda Brand (3/3)	Puck Pieterse	Annemarie Worst
2023	Zaltbommel	Puck Pieterse (1/2)	Ceylin del Carmen Alvarado	Fem van Empel
2022	Rucphen	Marianne Vos (7/7)	Lucinda Brand	Ceylin del Carmen Alvarado
2021	Zaltbommel	not held due to COVID-19		
2020	Rucphen	Ceylin del Carmen Alvarado (1/2)	Annemarie Worst	Lucinda Brand
2019	Huijbergen	Lucinda Brand (2/3)	Marianne Vos	Maud Kaptheijns
2018	Surhuisterveen	Lucinda Brand (1/3)	Maud Kaptheijns	Annemarie Worst
2017	Sint-Michielsgestel	Marianne Vos (6/7)	Lucinda Brand	Sophie de Boer
10-01-2016	Hellendoorn	Thalita de Jong	Sabrina Stultiens	Maud Kaptheijns
2015	Veldhoven	Marianne Vos (5/7)	Sophie de Boer	Sabrina Stultiens
2014	Gieten	Marianne Vos (4/7)	Sophie de Boer	Sabrina Stultiens
2013	Hilvarenbeek	Marianne Vos (3/7)	Sanne van Paassen	Sabrina Stultiens
2012	Huijbergen	Marianne Vos (2/7)	Daphny van den Brand	Sophie de Boer
2011	Sint-Michielsgestel	Marianne Vos (1/7)	Daphny van den Brand	Sanne van Paassen
2010	Heerlen	Daphny van den Brand (11/11)	Marianne Vos	Sanne van Paassen
2009	Huijbergen	Daphny van den Brand (10/11)	Mirjam Melchers-van Poppel	Saskia Elemans
2008	Sint-Michielsgestel	Mirjam Melchers-van Poppel (2/2)	Daphny van den Brand	Saskia Elemans
2007	Woerden	Daphny van den Brand (9/11)	Marianne Vos	Reza Hormes-Ravenstijn
2006	Huijbergen	Daphny van den Brand (8/11)	Marianne Vos	Reza Hormes-Ravenstijn
2005	Zeddam	Daphny van den Brand (7/11)	Marianne Vos	Mirjam Melchers-van Poppel
2004	Heerlen	Mirjam Melchers-van Poppel (1/2)	Daphny van den Brand	Elsbeth van Rooy-Vink
2003	Huijbergen	Daphny van den Brand (6/11)	Corine Dorland	Marianne Vos
2002	Zeddam	Daphny van den Brand (5/11)	Corine Dorland	Debby Mansveld
2001	Pijnacker	Daphny van den Brand (4/11)	Corine Dorland	Debby Mansveld
2000	Gieten	Daphny van den Brand (3/11)	Corine Dorland	Daniëlle Jansen
1999	Heerlen	Daphny van den Brand (2/11)	Inge Velthuis	Daniëlle Jansen
1998	Woerden	Daphny van den Brand (1/11)	Reza Hormes-Ravenstijn	Inge Velthuis
1997	Zeddam	Inge Velthuis	Reza Hormes-Ravenstijn	Natascha den Ouden
1996	Zwolle	Loes van Wersch	Natascha den Ouden	Reza Hormes-Ravenstijn
1995	Soestduinen	Reza Hormes-Ravenstijn	Loes van Wersch	Nicolle Leijten
1994	Sint-Michielsgestel	Natascha den Ouden (4/4)	Jet Jongeling	Daphny van den Brand
1993	Beekse Bergen, Tilburg	Nicolle Leijten (2/2)	Loes van Wersch	Suzan van Bussel
1992	Valkenswaard	Natascha den Ouden (3/4)	Elsbeth Vink	Nicolle Leijten
1991	Gieten	Nicolle Leijten (1/2)	Natascha den Ouden	Renate Heijboer
1990	Maarn	Natascha den Ouden (2/4)	Nicolle Leijten	Trudy van de Elzen
1989	Sint-Michielsgestel	Natascha den Ouden (1/4)	Anita Hakkert	Anita Mulder
1988	Hulsberg	Anita Hakkert	Natascha den Ouden	Renate Heijboer
1987	Oldenzaal	Henneke Lieverse	Agnes Loohuis-Damveld	Anita Hakkert
