= Lukas Winterberg =

Swiss cyclist

Personal information
- Born: 4 May 1988 (age 38) Aigle, Switzerland

Cycling career
- Sport: Cycling
- Discipline: Cyclo-cross
- Role: Rider

Lukas Winterberg (born 4 May 1988) is a Swiss male cyclo-cross cyclist. He represented his nation in the men's elite event at the 2016 UCI Cyclo-cross World Championships in Heusden-Zolder.
