= Isabella Wieser =

Austrian cyclist

Personal information
- Born: 7 April 1976 (age 50) Austria

Cycling career
- Sport: Cycling
- Discipline: Road cycling

Isabella Wieser (born 7 April 1976) is a road cyclist from Austria. She represented her nation at the 2002, 2005, and 2006 UCI Road World Championships. She won the Austrian National Road Race Championships in 2002.
