= Albert Hainz =

Austrian cyclist

Personal information
- Born: 1 October 1964 (age 62) Braunau am Inn, Austria

Cycling career
- Sport: Cycling

Albert Hainz (1 October 1964) is an Austrian former cyclist. He won the Austrian National Road Race Championships in 1988.
