= Rik van IJzendoorn =

Personal information
- Born: 22 August 1987 (age 39) Ochten, Netherlands

Cycling career
- Sport: Cycling
- Discipline: Road
- Role: Rider

Amateur teams
- 2008: Metec
- 2009: JvR de Batauwers
- 2010–2011: Cube–Nutswerk Mountainbike
- 2012: JvR de Batauwers
- 2013: Natubalans–Apex
- 2014–2015: JvR de Batauwers
- 2016: Novo Nordisk Development
- 2016: Team Novo Nordisk (stagiaire)

Professional teams
- 2006–2007: Palmans–Collstrop
- 2017–2018: Team Novo Nordisk

Rik van IJzendoorn (born 22 August 1987) is a Dutch professional road racing cyclist and cyclocross racer, who last rode for UCI Professional Continental team Team Novo Nordisk. He competed at the 2017 Milan–San Remo where he finished in 190th position.

Rik is the brother of Dutch rider Eddy van IJzendoorn.
