= Karl Heinz Gollinger =

Austrian cyclist

Personal information
- Born: 30 June 1983 (age 43)

Cycling career
- Sport: Cycling
- Discipline: Cyclo-cross
- Role: Rider

Karl Heinz Gollinger (born 30 June 1983) is an Austrian male cyclo-cross cyclist. He represented his nation in the men's elite event at the 2016 UCI Cyclo-cross World Championships in Heusden-Zolder.
