= Lisa Jacobs (cyclist) =

Australian cyclo-cross cyclist

Personal information
- Born: 17 September 1981 (age 45)

Cycling career
- Sport: Cycling
- Discipline: Cyclo-cross
- Role: Rider

Lisa Jacobs (born 17 September 1981) is an Australian female cyclo-cross cyclist. She was the Australian National Cyclocross Champion in 2013, 2014 and 2015. She competed in the women's elite event at the 2016 UCI Cyclo-cross World Championships in Heusden-Zolder.
