= Martin Eriksson (cyclist) =

Swedish cyclist

Personal information
- Born: 14 September 1992 (age 34) Gothenburg, Sweden

Cycling career
- Sport: Cycling
- Discipline: Cyclo-cross
- Role: Rider

Martin Eriksson (born 14 September 1992) is a Swedish male cyclo-cross cyclist. He represented his nation in the men's elite event at the 2016 UCI Cyclo-cross World Championships in Heusden-Zolder.
