= Angelica Edvardsson =

Swedish cyclist

Personal information
- Born: 29 August 1989 (age 37)

Cycling career
- Sport: Cycling
- Discipline: Cyclo-cross
- Role: Rider

Angelica Edvardsson (born 29 August 1989) is a Swedish cyclo-cross cyclist. She represented her nation in the women's elite event at the 2016 UCI Cyclo-cross World Championships in Heusden-Zolder.
