= Eddy van IJzendoorn =

Dutch cyclist (born 1985)

Personal information
- Born: 21 March 1985 (age 41) Tiel, Netherlands

Cycling career
- Sport: Cycling
- Disciplines: Cyclo-cross; Road
- Role: Rider

Amateur teams
- 2002: Rabobank
- 2003: Quickstep–Sweet Paradise
- 2008: Line-Lloyd Footwear Cycling Team

Professional teams
- 2004–2005: Van Vliet–EBH Advocaten
- 2006–2007: Palmans–Collstrop
- 2009–2011: AA Cycling Team

Eddy van IJzendoorn (born 21 March 1985) is a Dutch professional cyclo-cross cyclist.

He competed multiple times at the elite level and won a junior silver medal at the 2003 UCI Cyclo-cross World Championships.

He is the brother of Rik van IJzendoorn.

Van IJzendoorn is a national and world masters champion.

== Major results ==
2002–2003
2nd UCI Junior World Championships
Junior Superprestige

2nd Sint-Michielsgestel
2nd Harnes

3rd National Junior Championships
2003–2004
3rd National Under-23 Championships
2004–2005
2nd National Under-23 Championships
2005–2006
Under-23 Superprestige

2nd Hoogstraten

3rd National Under-23 Championships
3rd Nacht van Woerden
2006–2007
UCI Under-23 World Cup

2nd Kalmthout

3rd Krawatencross Under-23
2008–2009
1st Sint-Michielsgestel
2009–2010
2nd Openingsveldrit van Harderwijk
2010–2011
3rd National Championships
2013–2014
3rd Rucphen
