= Philipp Heigl =

Austrian cyclo-cross cyclist (born 1993)

Personal information
- Born: 8 September 1993 (age 33) Vienna, Austria

Cycling career
- Sport: Cycling
- Discipline: Cyclo-cross
- Role: Rider

Philipp Heigl (born 8 September 1993) is an Austrian cyclo-cross cyclist. He represented his nation in the men's elite event at the 2016 UCI Cyclo-cross World Championships in Heusden-Zolder.

== Major results ==
2013–2014
2nd National Under-23 Championships
2014–2015
2nd National Under-23 Championships
2017–2018
3rd National Championships
2019–2020
2nd National Championships
2021–2022
3rd National Championships
2022–2023
2nd National Championships
