= Cameron Jette =

Canadian cyclo-cross cyclist

Personal information
- Born: July 1, 1987 (age 39) Toronto, Ontario, Canada

Cycling career
- Sport: Cycling
- Discipline: Cyclo-cross
- Role: Rider

Cameron Jette (born July 1, 1987) is a Canadian male cyclo-cross cyclist. He represented his nation in the men's elite event at the 2016 UCI Cyclo-cross World Championships in Heusden-Zolder. After a 2-year absence Cameron returned to competition at the 2019 World Cyclocross Championships in Bogense, Denmark. Three laps into the race he was involved in a crash with Slovakia's Ondrej Glaza. He finished the race in 56th place. Cameron also won a euchre tournament while paired with Gunnar Holmgren. They defeated Tyler Orschel and Magdaleine Vallieres Mill rather easily in a best of 7.
