= Mark McConnell (cyclist) =

Canadian cyclist

Personal information
- Born: 2 October 1988 (age 38) Vancouver, British Columbia, Canada

Cycling career
- Sport: Cycling
- Discipline: Cyclo-cross
- Role: Rider

Mark McConnell (born 2 October 1988) is a Canadian male cyclo-cross cyclist. He represented his nation in the Men's elite race at the 2016 UCI Cyclo-cross World Championships in Heusden-Zolder.
