= Angus Edmond =

New Zealander bicycle racer

Personal information
- Born: 3 February 1976 (age 50)

Cycling career
- Sport: Cycling
- Discipline: Cyclo-cross
- Role: Rider

Angus Edmond (born 3 February 1976) is a New Zealand cyclo-cross cyclist. He represented his nation in the men's elite event at the 2016 UCI Cyclo-cross World Championships in Heusden-Zolder.
