= Thijs van Amerongen =

Dutch cyclo-cross cyclist (born 1986)

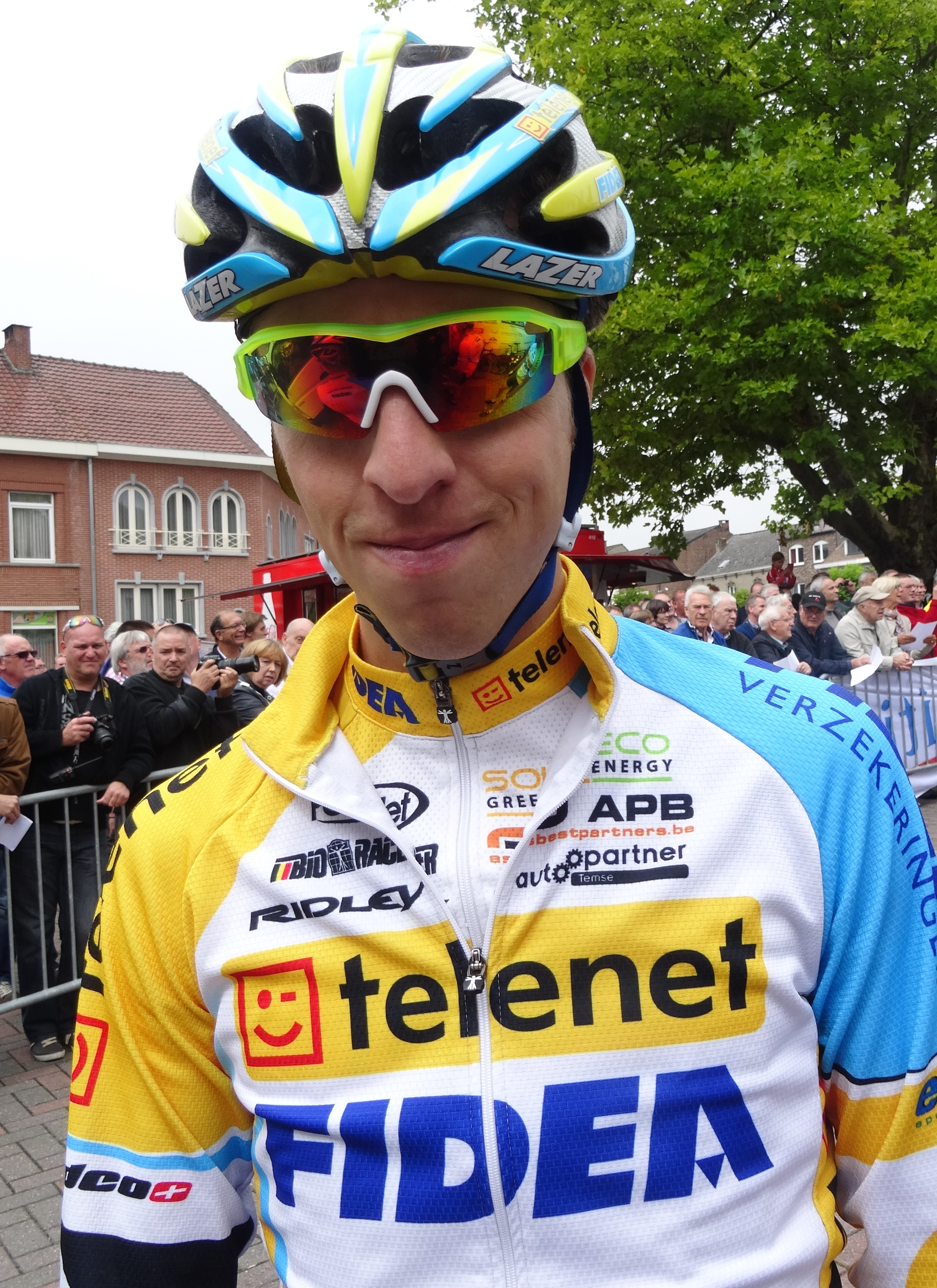

Personal information
- Born: 18 July 1986 (age 40) Warnsveld, Netherlands
- Height: 1.88 m (6 ft 2 in)
- Weight: 70 kg (154 lb)

Cycling career
- Sport: Cycling
- Current team: Retired
- Disciplines: Cyclo-cross; Road
- Role: Rider

Professional teams
- 2005: Team Löwik Meubelen–Van Losser
- 2006–2008: Van Vliet–EBH Advocaten
- 2009: Vacansoleil
- 2010–2011: AA Drink
- 2014–2016: Telenet–Fidea
- 2017: Destil–Jo Piels

Thijs van Amerongen (born 18 July 1986 in Warnsveld) is a Dutch former professional road and cyclo-cross cyclist. He represented his nation in the men's elite event at the 2016 UCI Cyclo-cross World Championships in Heusden-Zolder.

== Major results ==
=== Cyclo-cross ===
2003–2004
1st National Junior Championships
Junior Superprestige

1st Saint-Michel-Gestel

2006–2007
1st National Under-23 Championships
2007–2008
1st Overall Under-23 Superprestige

1st Diegem
1st Hamme-Zogge

1st Krawatencross Under-23
2009–2010
3rd Centrumcross Surhuisterveen
2011–2012
2nd National Championships
3rd Cyclo-cross Heerlen
2012–2013
2nd Centrumcross Surhuisterveen
3rd National Championships
9th UCI World Championships
2013–2014
2nd Cyclo-cross Heerlen
2nd International Cyclocross Finance centrum
2nd Centrumcross Surhuisterveen
3rd National Championships
2014–2015
1st Grand-Prix de la Commune de Contern
1st Kiremko Nacht van Woerden
2015–2016
6th European Championships
2017–2018
1st Int. Radquerfeldein GP Lambach
3rd Qiansen Trophy Yanqing

=== Road ===
2003
4th Trofeo comune di Vertova
2004
1st Stage 4 Int. Junioren Driedaagse van Axel
1st Mountains classification, Oberösterreich Juniorenrundfahrt
2nd Circuit de la Région Wallonne
3rd Time trial, National Junior Road Championships
