= List of cyclists at the 2017 UEC European Cyclo-cross Championships =

This is a list of all cyclo-cross cyclists who competed at the 2017 UEC European Cyclo-cross Championships in Tábor, Czech Republic on 5 November 2017. There were for men and women an elite and under-23 race and a men's junior race.

== Men's elite ==
Belgium

Czech Republic

France

- 1. Toon Aerts
- 2. Jens Adams
- 4. Quinten Hermans
- 5. Tim Merlier
- 6. Kevin Pauwels
- 7. Daan Soete
- 8. Laurens Sweeck
- 9. Michael Vanthourenhout
- 11. Gianni Vermeersch
- 13. Martin Bína
- 14. Michael Boroš
- 15. Emil Hekele
- 17. Michal Malík
- 18. Jan Nesvadba
- 19. Tomáš Paprstka
- 20. Lubomír Petruš
- 21. Jan Škarnitzl
- 22. Matthieu Boulo
- 23. Fabien Canal
- 24. Steve Chainel

Germany

Hungary

Italy

- 25. Manuel Müller
- 26. Philipp Walsleben
- 27. Zsolt Búr
- 28. Gioele Bertolini

Netherlands

Poland

Slovakia

- 30. Stan Godrie
- 31. Twan van den Brand
- 42. Lars van der Haar
- 34. David van der Poel
- 35. Mathieu van der Poel
- 36. Corné van Kessel
- 37. Marek Konwa
- 39. Ondrej Glajza
- 40. Martin Haring
- 41. Simon Vozar

Sweden

Switzerland

- 42. Martin Eriksson
- 43. David Eriksson
- 44. Henrik Jansson
- 45. Severin Sägesser
- 46. Michael Wildhaber
- 47. Marcel Wildhaber
- 48. Simon Zahner

== Women's elite ==
Belgium

Czech Republic

France

- 1. Sanne Cant
- 8. Loes Sels
- 9. Ellen Van Loy
- 10. Joyce Vanderbeken
- 12. Jolien Verschueren
- 13. Pavla Havlíková
- 14. Vendula Kuntová
- 15. Martina Mikulášková
- 16. Karla Štěpánová
- 17. Lucie Chainel

Germany

Great Britain

Italy

- 18. Stefanie Paul
- 19. Nikki Brammeier
- 20. Hannah Payton
- 21. Helen Wyman
- 22. Alice Maria Arzuffi
- 23. Eva Lechner

Netherlands

Poland

Slovakia

- 2. Denise Betsema
- 3. Lucinda Brand
- 5. Geerte Hoeke
- 6. Maud Kaptheijns
- 7. Annemarie Worst
- 24. Magdalena Sadlecka
- 25. Tatiana Jaseková
- 26. Janka Keseg Števková

Sweden

Switzerland

- 27. Ida Erngren
- 28. Jasmin Egger-Achermann

== Men's under-23 ==
Belgium

Czech Republic

France

- 2. Thijs Aerts
- 4. Eli Iserbyt
- 5. Thomas Joseph
- 6. Yannick Peeters
- 7. Jelle Schuermans
- 8. Toon Vandebosch
- 9. Jonáš Březina
- 11. David Honzák
- 13. Josef Jelínek
- 14. Lukáš Kunt
- 15. Daniel Mayer
- 18. Jakub Šulc
- 19. Adam Ťoupalík
- 20. Šimon Vaníček
- 21. Antoine Benoist
- 22. Joshua Dubau
- 23. Lucas Dubau
- 24. Sandy Dujardin
- 25. Eddy Finé

Germany

Great Britain

Italy

- 26. Paul Lindenau
- 27. Maximilian Möbis
- 28. Tom Pidcock
- 29. Jakob Dorigoni
- 30. Antonio Folcarelli

Luxembourg

Netherlands

Poland

- 32. Félix Schreiber
- 34. Thymen Arensman
- 35. Kelvin Bakx
- 36. Jens Dekker
- 37. Maik van der Heijden
- 40. Sieben Wouters
- 41. Marcin Budziński
- 42. Tomasz Budziński
- 43. Wojciech Ceniuch
- 44. Dawid Jona
- 45. Stanisław Nowak

Slovakia

Switzerland

- 46. Juraj Bellan
- 47. Jakub Kurty
- 48. Matej Ulik
- 49. Jakub Varhanovsky
- 50. Johan Jacobs
- 51. Kevin Kuhn
- 52. Timon Rüegg

== Women's under-23 ==
Italy

Belgium

Czech Republic

- 1. Chiara Teocchi
- 2. Sara Casasola
- 3. Silvia Persico
- 4. Axelle Bellaert
- 5. Laura Verdonschot
- 6. Suzanne Verhoeven
- 7. Nikola Bajgerová
- 8. Jana Czeczinkarová
- 10. Magdalena Mišoňová
- 11. Nikola Nosková
- 13. Adéla Šafářová
- 14. Denisa Švecová
- 15. Tereza Švihálková
- 16. Elizabeth Ungermanová

Estonia

France

Great Britain

- 18. Mari-Liis Mõttus
- 19. Évita Muzic
- 20. Marion Norbert-Riberolle
- 21. Harriet Harnden
- 22. Anna Kay

Hungary

Netherlands

Poland

- 23. Virág Buzsáki
- 24. Kata Blanka Vas
- 25. Manon Bakker
- 26. Ceyli del Carmen Alvarado
- 27. Yara Kastelijn
- 28. Fleur Nagengast
- 29. Inge van der Heijden
- 30. Kinga Kalembkiewicz
- 31. Brygida Piersiak
- 32. Agnieszka Szpocińska

Slovakia

Switzerland

Austria

- 33. Erika Glajzová
- 34. Natália Glajzová
- 35. Radka Paulechová
- 36. Radka Rabatinová
- 37. Zina Barhoumi
- 38. Lara Krähemann
- 39. Noemi Rüegg
- 40. Nadja Heigl

== Men's junior ==
United Kingdom

Belgium

Czech Republic

- 2. Sean Flynn
- 3. Lewis Askey
- 4. Ben Tulett
- 5. Jarno Bellens
- 6. Maxim Dewulf
- 7. Gerben Kuypers
- 9. Arno Van Den Broeck
- 10. Vince Van Den Eynde
- 11. Niels Vandeputte
- 14. Jakub Hník
- 15. Tomáš Ježek
- 16. Tomas Kopecky
- 18. Vladimír Mikšaník
- 19. Jakub Říman
- 20. Jakub Schierl
- 22. Alvin Tomášek
- 23. Jakub Ťoupalík

France

Germany

Hungary

- 24. Aloïs Charrin
- 25. Anthony Courrière
- 26. Joris Delbove
- 27. Benjamin Rivet
- 28. Mattéo Vercher
- 29. Tom Lindner
- 30. David Westhoff
- 31. Tim Wollenberg
- 32. Erik Fetter
- 33. Balázs Vas

Italy

Luxembourg

Netherlands

- 34. Filippo Fontana
- 70. Federico Ceolin
- 35. Nicolas Kess
- 36. Jang Leyder
- 37. Cédric Pries
- 38. Bart Artz
- 40. Bodi Del Grosso
- 42. Mees Hendrikx
- 43. Ryan Kamp
- 44. Pim Ronhaar
- 45. Luke Verburg

Poland

Slovakia

Sweden

- 47. Maciej Borkowski
- 49. Nikodem Grzenkowicz
- 50. Łukasz Helizanowicz
- 51. Piotr Krynski
- 53. Maciej Stępień
- 54. Matúš Baniar
- 56. Matúš Černek
- 57. Oliver Jaroš
- 58. Lukáš Kubis
- 59. Eric Herlitz
- 60. Emil Lindgren
- 61. Anton Niederbach

Switzerland

Austria

- 62. Noé Barras
- 63. Kedup Gyagang
- 64. Rémi Premand
- 65. Loris Rouiller
- 66. Luca Schätti
- 67. Jan Sommer
- 68. Felix Stehli
- 69. Stiven Thür
- 71. Jakob Reiter
