= UCI Cyclo-cross World Championships – Junior men's race =

UCI Cyclo-cross World Championships – Men's junior race
- Rainbow jersey

Race details
- Date: End of January, beginning of February
- Discipline: Cyclo-cross
- Type: One-day
- Organiser: UCI

History
- First edition: 1979
- Editions: 45 (as of 2024)
- First winner: Iñaki Vijandi (ESP)
- Most wins: Mathieu Van der Poel (NED); Ben Tulett (GBR), 2 wins
- Most recent: Stefano Viezzi (ITA)

The UCI Cyclo-cross World Championships – Junior Men's Cyclo-cross is the annual world championship for in the discipline of cyclo-cross for men in the Junior category, organised by the world governing body, the Union Cycliste Internationale. The winner has the right to wear the rainbow jersey for a full year when competing in Junior cyclo-cross events.

== Palmares ==
Year	Gold	Silver	Bronze
1979	Iñaki Vijandi (ESP)	Bart Musschoolt (BEL)	Heinz Matschke (GER)
1980	Radomír Šimůnek (TCH)	Jokin Mújika (ESP)	Bernard Woodti (SUI)
1981	Rigobert Matt (GER)	Miroslav Kvasnička (TCH)	Konrad Morf (SUI)
1982	Beat Schumacher (SUI)	Erwin Nijboer (NED)	Radovan Fořt (TCH)
1983	Roman Kreuziger (TCH)	Martin Hendriks (NED)	Peter Hric (TCH)
1984	Ondrej Glajza (TCH)	Robert Dane (GBR)	Richard Koberna (TCH)
1985	Beat Wabel (SUI)	Jürgen Sprich (GER)	Wim de Vos (NED)
1986	Stuart Marshall (GBR)	Beat Brechbühl (SUI)	Wim de Vos (NED)
1987	Marc Janssens (BEL)	Ralph Berner (GER)	Tomas Port (TCH)
1988	Thomas Frischknecht (SUI)	Maik Müller (GER)	Daniel Rech (TCH)
1989	Richard Groenendaal (NED)	Emmanuel Magnien (FRA)	Christian Bertotti (ITA)
1990	Eric Boezewinkel (NED)	Jérôme Chiotti (FRA)	Niels van der Steen (NED)
1991	Ondřej Lukeš (TCH)	Jiří Pospíšil (TCH)	Dariusz Gil (POL)
1992	Roger Hammond (GBR)	Vojtech Bachleda (TCH)	Jan Faltynek (TCH)
1993	Kamil Ausbuher (CZE)	Jaromír Friede (CZE)	Miguel Martinez (FRA)
1994	Gretienus Gommers (NED)	Kamil Ausbuher (CZE)	Ben Berden (BEL)
1995	Zdeněk Mlynář (CZE)	Guillaume Benoist (FRA)	Stefan Bünter (SUI)
1996	Roman Peter (SUI)	Gaizka Lejarreta (ESP)	Grégory Lapalud (FRA)
1997	David Rusch (SUI)	Stefano Toffoletti (ITA)	Steffen Weigold (GER)
1998	Michael Baumgartner (SUI)	Stefano Toffoletti (ITA)	Davy Commeyne (BEL)
1999	Matthew Kelly (USA)	Sven Vanthourenhout (BEL)	Thijs Verhagen (NED)
2000	Bart Aernouts (BEL)	Walker Ferguson (USA)	David Kášek (CZE)
2001	Martin Bína (CZE)	Radomír Šimůnek (CZE)	Jan Kunta (CZE)
2002	Kevin Pauwels (BEL)	Krysztof Kuzniak (POL)	Zdeněk Štybar (CZE)
2003	Lars Boom (NED)	Eddy van IJzendoorn (NED)	Zdeněk Štybar (CZE)
2004	Niels Albert (BEL)	Roman Kreuziger (CZE)	Clément Lhotellerie (FRA)
2005	Davide Malacarne (ITA)	Julien Taramarcaz (SUI)	Christoph Pfingsten (GER)
2006	Boy van Poppel (NED)	Róbert Gavenda (SVK)	Tom Meeusen (BEL)
2007	Joeri Adams (BEL)	Daniel Summerhill (USA)	Jiří Polnický (CZE)
2008	Arnaud Jouffroy (FRA)	Peter Sagan (SVK)	Lubomír Petruš (CZE)
2009	Tijmen Eising (NED)	Corné van Kessel (NED)	Alexandre Billon (FRA)
2010	Tomáš Paprstka (CZE)	Julian Alaphilippe (FRA)	Emiel Dolfsma (NED)
2011	Clément Venturini (FRA)	Fabien Doubey (FRA)	Loïc Doubey (FRA)
2012	Mathieu van der Poel (NED)	Wout van Aert (BEL)	Quentin Jaurégui (FRA)
2013	Mathieu van der Poel (NED)	Martijn Budding (NED)	Adam Ťoupalík (CZE)
2014	Thijs Aerts (BEL)	Yannick Peeters (BEL)	Jelle Schuermans (BEL)
2015	Simon Andreassen (DEN)	Eli Iserbyt (BEL)	Max Gulickx (NED)
2016	Jens Dekker (NED)	Mickael Crispin (FRA)	Thomas Bonnet (FRA)
2017	Tom Pidcock (GBR)	Dan Tulett (GBR)	Ben Turner (GBR)
2018	Ben Tulett (GBR)	Tomáš Kopecký (CZE)	Ryan Kamp (NED)
2019	Ben Tulett (GBR)	Witse Meeussen (BEL)	Ryan Cortjens (BEL)
2020	Thibau Nys (BEL)	Lennert Belmans (BEL)	Emiel Verstrynge (BEL)
2021	not held due to the COVID-19 pandemic		
2022	Jan Christen (SUI)	Aaron Dockx (BEL)	Nathan Smith (GBR)
2023	Léo Bisiaux (FRA)	Senna Remijn (NED)	Yordi Corsus (BEL)
2024	Stefano Viezzi (ITA)	Keije Solen (NED)	Kryštof Bažant (CZE)
2025	Mattia Agostinacchio (ITA)	Soren Bruyere Joumard (FRA)	Filippo Grigolini (ITA)

== Medal count by country ==
Rank	Nation	Gold	Silver	Bronze	Total
1	Netherlands (NED)	9	7	7	23
2	Belgium (BEL)	7	8	7	22
3	Switzerland (SUI)	7	2	3	12
4	Great Britain (GBR)	5	2	2	9
5	Czech Republic (CZE)	4	5	8	17
6	Czechoslovakia (TCH)	4	3	6	13
7	France (FRA)	3	7	7	17
8	Italy (ITA)	3	2	2	7
9	Germany (GER)	1	3	3	7
10	Spain (ESP)	1	2	0	3
10	United States (USA)	1	2	0	3
12	Denmark (DEN)	1	0	0	1
13	Slovakia (SVK)	0	2	0	2
14	Poland (POL)	0	1	1	2
Totals (14 entries)		46	46	46	138

Czechoslovakia peacefully split up in Slovakia and Czech Republic in 1993, they are all counted separately following the IOC's example. See also talk page.
