= 1997 UCI Cyclo-cross World Championships =

Cyclo-cross championship

- Venue: Munich, Germany
- Date: 1–2 February 1997
- Coordinates: 48°08′15″N 11°34′30″E
- Events: 3

The 1997 UCI Cyclo-cross World Championships were held in Munich, Germany from 1-2 February 1997.

== Medal table ==
Rank	Nation	Gold	Silver	Bronze	Total
1	Italy (ITA)	1	1	1	3
2	Belgium (BEL)	1	1	0	2
2	Switzerland (SUI)	1	1	0	2
4	France (FRA)	0	0	1	1
4	Germany (GER)	0	0	1	1
Totals (5 entries)		3	3	3	9

== Medal summary ==
Event	Gold		Silver		Bronze	
Men's elite race	Daniele Pontoni (ITA)	01:00:40	Thomas Frischknecht (SWI)	+ 0:23	Luca Bramati (ITA)	+ 0:23
Men's under-23 race	Sven Nys (BEL)	53:25	Bart Wellens (BEL)	+ 0:22	Christophe Morel (FRA)	+ 0:38
Men's junior race	David Rusch (SUI)	46:14	Stefano Toffoletti (ITA)	+ 0:05	Steffen Weigold (GER)	+ 0:06

== Results ==
=== Elite ===
Rank	Rider	Nation	Time
1	Daniele Pontoni	Italy	1:00:40
2	Thomas Frischknecht	Switzerland	+ 0:23
3	Luca Bramati	Italy	+ 0:23
4	Adrie van der Poel	Netherlands	+ 0:35
5	Wim de Vos	Netherlands	+ 0:53
6	Erwin Vervecken	Belgium	+ 1:13
7	Franz-Josef Nieberding	Germany	+ 1:25
8	Beat Wabel	Switzerland	+ 1:39
9	Dieter Runkel	Switzerland	+ 1:39
10	Peter Van Santvliet	Belgium	+ 2:04

=== Under-23 ===
Rank	Rider	Nation	Time
1	Sven Nys	Belgium	53:25
2	Bart Wellens	Belgium	+ 0:22
3	Christophe Morel	France	+ 0:38
4	Miguel Martinez	France	+ 0:58
5	Gretenius Gommers	Netherlands	+ 1:27
6	Elvis Zucci	Italy	+ 1:33
7	Guillaume Benoist	France	+ 1:37
8	Gerben de Knegt	Netherlands	+ 1:45
9	Zdeněk Mlynář	Czech Republic	+ 1:46
10	David Willemsens	Belgium	+ 1:47

=== Junior ===
Pos.	Cycliste	Pays	Temps
1	David Rusch	Switzerland	46:14
2	Stefano Toffoletti	Italy	+ 0:05
3	Steffen Weigold	Germany	+ 0:06
4	Nicolas Dieudonné	France	+ 0:08
5	Torsten Hiekmann	Germany	+ 0:11
6	John Gadret	France	+ 0:12
7	Thomas Lecuyer	France	+ 0:25
8	Andrew Vancoillie	Belgium	+ 1:14
9	Davy Commeyne	Belgium	+ 1:22
10	Wilant van Gils	Netherlands	+ 1:30
