= 1999 UCI Cyclo-cross World Championships =

Bicycle racing championship in Poprad, Slovakia

- Venue: Poprad, Slovakia
- Date: 30–31 January 1999
- Coordinates: 49°03′34″N 20°17′51″E
- Events: 3

The 1999 UCI Cyclo-cross World Championships were held in Poprad, Slovakia on Saturday 30 January 1999 and Sunday 31 January 1999.

== Men's Elite ==
Held on Sunday January 31, 1999.

RANK	1999 UCI CYCLO-CROSS WORLD CHAMPIONSHIPS	TIME
1. Gold medal	Mario De Clercq (BEL)	01:02:50
2. Silver medal	Erwin Vervecken (BEL)	+ 0:08
3. Bronze medal	Adri van der Poel (NED)	+ 0:24
4.	Daniele Pontoni (ITA)	+ 1:24
5.	Thomas Frischknecht (SUI)	+ 1:42
6.	Sven Nys (BEL)	+ 2:09
7.	Radomír Šimůnek (CZE)	+ 2:13
8.	Peter van Santvliet (BEL)	+ 2:49
9.	Jiri Pospisil (CZE)	+ 3:17
10.	Ben Berden (BEL)	+ 3:41

== Men's Under 23 ==
Held on Saturday January 30, 1999.

RANK	1999 UCI CYCLO-CROSS WORLD CHAMPIONSHIPS U23	TIME
1. Gold medal	Bart Wellens (BEL)	00:53:47
2. Silver medal	Tom Vannoppen (BEL)	+ 1:34
3. Bronze medal	Tim Johnson (USA)	+ 1:35
4	Steffen Weigold (GER)	+ 1:53
5	John Gadret (FRA)	+ 2:05
6	Guillaume Benoist (FRA)	+ 2:32
7	Emil Hekele (CZE)	+ 2:38
8	David Derepas (FRA)	+ 2:40
9	David Sussemilch (CZE)	+ 2:51
10	Pascal Van Bussel (NED)	+ 3:06

== Men's Juniors ==
Held on Sunday January 31, 1999.

RANK	1999 UCI CYCLO-CROSS WORLD CHAMPIONSHIPS Juniors	TIME
1. Gold medal	Matt Kelly (USA)	00:37:26
2. Silver medal	Sven Vanthourenhout (BEL)	+ 0:01
3. Bronze medal	Thijs Verhagen (NED)	+ 0:12
4	David Kasek (CZE)	+ 1:04
5	Will Frischkorn (USA)	+ 1:07
6	Jean-Baptiste Beraud (FRA)	+ 1:07
7	Tim Van Nuffel (BEL)	+ 1:22
8	Wouter Bunning (NED)	+ 1:28
9	Ronald Heigl (SUI)	+ 1:35
10	Hannes Genze (GER)	+ 1:42
