= 1996 UCI Cyclo-cross World Championships =

Cyclo-cross championship

- Venue: Montreuil, France
- Date: 3–4 February 1996
- Coordinates: 48°51′N 2°26′E
- Events: 3

The 1996 UCI Cyclo-cross World Championships were held in Montreuil, Seine-Saint-Denis, France from 3-4 February 1996. This was the first year that the under-23 race was held.

== Medal summary ==
Event	Gold		Silver		Bronze	
Men's elite race	Adrie van der Poel (NED)	56' 12"	Daniele Pontoni (ITA)	+ 0:00	Luca Bramati (ITA)	+ 0:00
Men's under-23 race	Miguel Martinez (FRA)	46' 57"	Patrick Blum (SUI)	+ 0:00	Zdeněk Mlynář (CZE)	+ 0:04
Men's junior race	Roman Peter (SUI)	40' 55"	Gaizka Lejarreta (ESP)	+ 0:59	Grégory Lapalud (FRA)	+ 0:59

== Results ==
=== Elite ===
Rank	Rider	Nation	Time
1	Adrie van der Poel	Netherlands	56' 12"
2	Daniele Pontoni	Italy	+ 0:00
3	Luca Bramati	Italy	+ 0:00
4	Henrik Djernis	Denmark	+ 0:09
5	Erwin Vervecken	Belgium	+ 0:09
6	Emmanuel Magnien	France	+ 0:09
7	Dieter Runkel	Switzerland	+ 0:21
8	Richard Groenendaal	Netherlands	+ 0:21
9	Jérôme Chiotti	France	+ 0:39
10	Beat Wabel	Switzerland	+ 0:59

=== Under-23 ===
Rank	Rider	Nation	Time
1	Miguel Martinez	France	46' 57"
2	Patrick Blum	Switzerland	+ 0:00
3	Zdeněk Mlynář	Czech Republic	+ 0:04
4	Maarten Nijland	Netherlands	+ 0:04
5	Kamil Ausbuher	Czech Republic	+ 0:14
6	David Süssemilch	Czech Republic	+ 0:14
7	Dario David Cioni	Italy	+ 0:14
8	Beat Blum	Switzerland	+ 0:14
9	Christophe Morel	France	+ 0:19
10	Guillaume Benoist	France	+ 0:25

=== Junior ===
Rank	Rider	Nation	Time
1	Roman Peter	Switzerland	40' 55"
2	Gaizka Lejarreta	Spain	+ 0:59
3	Grégory Lapalud	France	+ 0:59
4	Peter Frei	Switzerland	+ 0:59
5	David Derepas	France	+ 0:59
6	John Gadret	France	+ 0:59
7	Christian Trafelet	Switzerland	+ 0:59
8	Bart Wellens	Belgium	+ 1:23
9	Matthias Kern	Switzerland	+ 1:36
10	David Tický	Czech Republic	+ 1:36
