= Cyklokros Plzeň =

Annual cyclo-cross race in Plzeň, Czech Republic

Race details
- Region: Plzeň, Czech Republic
- English name: Cyclo-cross Plzeň
- Discipline: Cyclo-cross
- Competition: UCI Cyclo-cross World Cup

History
- First edition: 1996
- Editions: 11
- First winner: Mario De Clercq (BEL)
- Most wins: Zdeněk Mlynář (CZE); Zdeněk Štybar (CZE); Niels Albert (BEL) (2 wins)
- Most recent: Niels Albert (BEL)

Cyklokros Plzeň (English: Cyclocross Plzeň) is a cyclo-cross race held annually in Plzeň, the Czech Republic as part of the UCI Cyclo-cross World Cup.

== Men ==
| Year | Country | Rider | Team |
|---|---|---|---|
| 1996 | Belgium | Mario De Clercq | |
| 1997; 2001 | No race | | |
| 2001 | Czech Republic | Jiří Pospíšil | |
| 2002 | Czech Republic | Ondřej Lukeš | |
| 2003 | No race | | |
| 2004 | Czech Republic | Zdeněk Mlynář | A.C. Sparta Praha |
| 2005 | Czech Republic | Petr Dlask | Author Praha |
| 2006 | Czech Republic | Zdeněk Štybar | A.C. Sparta Praha |
| 2007 | Czech Republic | Zdeněk Mlynář | A.C. Sparta Praha |
| 2008 | Czech Republic | Martin Zlámalík | Prodoli Racing Team |
| 2009 | Belgium | Niels Albert | BKCP–Powerplus |
| 2010 | Czech Republic | Zdeněk Štybar | Telenet–Fidea |
| 2011 | Belgium | Sven Nys | Landbouwkrediet |
| 2012 | Belgium | Niels Albert | BKCP–Powerplus |

== Women ==
| Year | Country | Rider | Team |
|---|---|---|---|
| 2006 | Czech Republic | Jana Kyptová | |
| 2007 | Czech Republic | Pavla Havlíková | |
| 2008 | Czech Republic | Pavla Havlíková | |
| 2009 | No race | | |
| 2010 | Netherlands | Sanne Van Paassen | |
| 2011 | United States | Katie Compton | Rabobank-Giant |
| 2012 | United States | Katie Compton | |
