= Czech National Cyclo-cross Championships =

- The champion's jersey

Race details
- Region: Czech Republic
- Discipline: Cyclo-cross
- Type: National championship
- Organiser: Czech Cycling Federation

History
- First edition: 1993

The Czech National Cyclo-cross Championships are held annually to decide the Czech cycling champions in the cyclo-cross discipline, across various categories.

== Men ==
Year	Winner	Second	Third
1993 (pro)	Radovan Fořt	Miloslav Kvasnička	František Klouček
1993 (amateur)	Pavel Elsnic	Ondřej Lukeš	Jiří Pospíšil
1994	Radomír Šimůnek Sr.	Ondřej Lukeš	Pavel Camrda
1995	Radomír Šimůnek Sr.	Pavel Elsnic	Ondřej Lukeš
1996	Jiří Pospíšil	Ondřej Lukeš	Radomír Šimůnek Sr.
1997	Radomír Šimůnek Sr.	Jiří Pospíšil	Zdeněk Mlynář
1998	Radomír Šimůnek Sr.	Jiří Pospíšil	Kamil Ausbuher
1999	Jiří Pospíšil	Petr Dlask	Radomír Šimůnek Sr.
2000	Petr Dlask	Radomír Šimůnek Sr.	Kamil Ausbuher
2001	Petr Dlask	Jiří Pospíšil	Václav Ježek
2002	Jiří Pospíšil	Martin Bína	Kamil Ausbuher
2003	Petr Dlask	Martin Bína	Václav Ježek
2004	Kamil Ausbuher	Martin Zlámalík	Radomír Šimůnek Jr.
2005	Zdeněk Štybar	Martin Bína	Radomír Šimůnek Jr.
2006	Petr Dlask	Martin Bína	Radomír Šimůnek Jr.
2007	Petr Dlask	Zdeněk Štybar	Radomír Šimůnek Jr.
2008	Zdeněk Štybar	Radomír Šimůnek Jr.	Lukáš Klouček
2009	Zdeněk Štybar	Radomír Šimůnek Jr.	Petr Dlask
2010	Zdeněk Štybar	Petr Dlask	Martin Bína
2011	Zdeněk Štybar	Martin Zlámalík	Jaroslav Kulhavý
2012	Zdeněk Štybar	Radomír Šimůnek Jr.	Karel Hník
2013	Zdeněk Štybar	Martin Bína	Vojtěch Nipl
2014	Martin Bína	Michael Boroš	Vladimír Kyzivát
2015	Adam Ťoupalík	Vojtěch Nipl	Michael Boroš
2016	Radomír Šimůnek Jr.	Michael Boroš	Adam Ťoupalík
2017	Michael Boroš	Tomáš Paprstka	Jan Nesvadba
2018	Michael Boroš	Jan Nesvadba	Adam Ťoupalík
2019	Michael Boroš	Tomáš Paprstka	Jan Nesvadba
2020	Emil Hekele	Tomáš Kopecký	Michael Boroš
2021	Michael Boroš	Tomáš Paprstka	Josef Jelínek
2022	Michael Boroš	Jakub Ťoupalík	Adam Ťoupalík
2023	Michael Boroš	Matyáš Kopecký	Jakub Říman
2024	Michael Boroš	Adam Ťoupalík	Zdeněk Štybar

== Women ==
Year	Winner	Second	Third
2000	Jana Jeřábková	Pavla Havlíková	Pavla Neradilová
2001	Karla Polívková	Pavla Havlíková	Zdeňka Havlíková
2002	Jindřiška Bejstová	Barbora Bohatá	Kateřina Bohatá
2003	Barbora Bohatá	Lenka Ochmanová	Klára Nepustilová
2004	Barbora Bohatá	Kateřina Bohatá	Šárka Chmurová
2005	Kateřina Bohatá		
2006	Jana Kyptová	Jitka Škarnitzlová	
2007	Pavla Havlíková	Barbora Bohatá	Jitka Škarnitzlová
2008	Pavla Havlíková	Jana Kyptová	Jitka Škarnitzlová
2010 (1)	Kateřina Nash	Pavla Havlíková	Jana Kyptová
2010 (2)	Kateřina Nash	Pavla Havlíková	Martina Mikulášková
2011	Martina Mikulášková	Pavla Havlíková	Pavlína Šulcová
2012	Pavla Havlíková	Martina Mikulášková	Elena Vaníčková
2013	Martina Mikulášková	Pavla Havlíková	Nikola Nosková
2014	Kateřina Nash	Martina Mikulášková	Pavla Havlíková
2016	Martina Mikulášková	Pavla Havlíková	Nikola Nosková
2017	Pavla Havlíková	Nikola Nosková	Adéla Šafářová
2018	Pavla Havlíková	Adéla Šafářová	Nikola Nosková
2019	Pavla Havlíková	Jana Czeczinkarová	Kamila Janů
2020	Pavla Havlíková	Tereza Švihálková	Nikola Bajgerová
2021	Pavla Havlíková	Nikola Nosková	Karla Štěpánová
2022	Kristýna Zemanová	Tereza Vaníčková	Nikola Bajgerová
2023	Kristýna Zemanová	Julia Kopecky	Nikola Bajgerová
2024	Kristýna Zemanová	Nikola Nosková	Simona Spěšná

== See also ==
- Czech National Road Race Championships
- Czech National Time Trial Championships
