= Julia Kopecký =

Czech cyclist (born 2004)

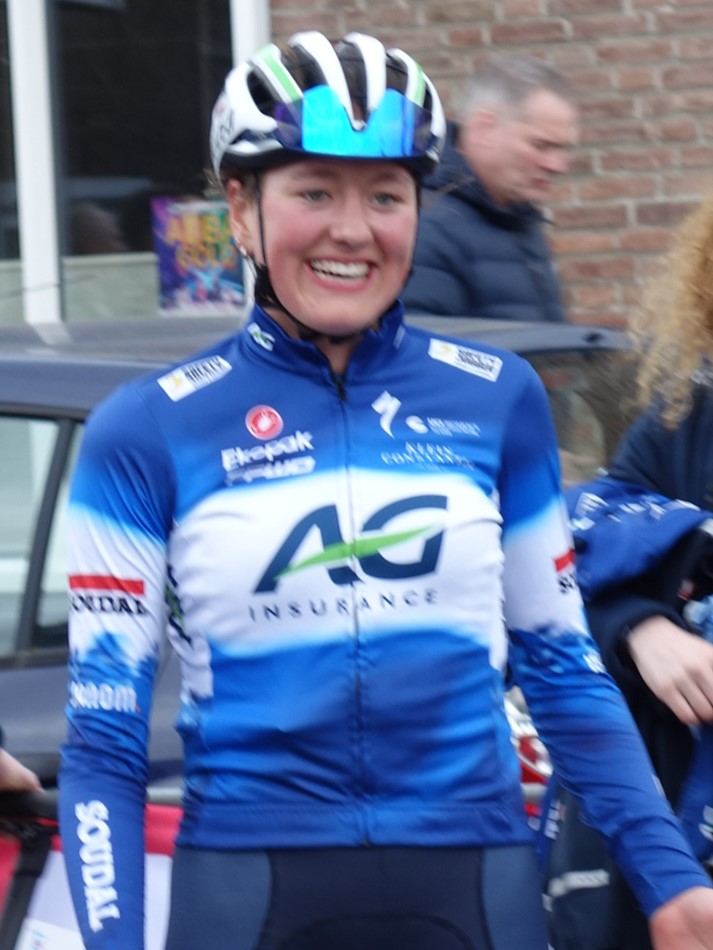
- Kopecký in 2024

Personal information
- Born: 10 August 2004 (age 22) Leiden, Netherlands

Cycling career
- Sport: Cycling
- Current team: Team SD Worx–Protime
- Disciplines: Road; Cyclo-cross
- Role: Rider

Amateur teams
- 2021: Restore Cycling Team
- 2022: NXTG U19

Professional teams
- 2023–2024: AG Insurance–Soudal NXTG U23
- 2025–: Team SD Worx–Protime

Major wins
- 2024 Tour de Feminin

Julia Kopecký (born 10 August 2004) is a Czech professional racing cyclist, who currently rides for UCI Women's WorldTeam Team SD Worx–Protime, having previously ridden for AG Insurance–Soudal NXTG. Her brothers Matyáš and Tomáš are also professional cyclists. She was selected to compete at the 2024 Summer Olympics and won the Tour de Feminin in the same year.

== Major results ==
=== Road ===
2021
2nd Time trial, National Junior Championships
3rd Overall Bizkaikoloreak
6th Overall Tour du Gévaudan Occitanie
2022
1st Road race, National Junior Championships
1st Stage 2 EPZ Omloop van Borsele Juniors
2nd Overall Watersley Ladies Challenge
7th Road race, UCI Junior World Championships
2023
1st Leiedal Koerse
4th Overall Tour de Feminin
6th Road race, European Under-23 Championships
10th Overall Baloise Ladies Tour
2024
National Championships

1st Time trial
3rd Road race

1st Overall Tour de Feminin

1st Points classification
1st Young rider classification
1st Stages 1 (ITT) & 2

2nd Volta NXT Classic
2nd Omloop van Borsele ITT
9th Overall Gracia–Orlová
10th Antwerp Port Epic

=== Cyclo-cross ===
2020–2021
1st National Junior Championships
Junior Toi Toi Cup

1st Jičín
1st Holé Vrchy
1st Mladá Boleslav

2021–2022
2nd National Junior Championships
Junior X²O Badkamers Trophy

3rd Herentals

2022–2023
2nd National Championships
2023–2024
2nd Rucphen
