= Luca Bramati =

Italian cyclist

Personal information
- Born: 6 November 1968 (age 57) Vaprio d'Adda, Italy

Cycling career
- Sport: Cycling
- Current team: Retired
- Disciplines: Cyclo-cross, cross-country
- Role: Rider

Professional teams
- 1991–1992: Colnago–Lampre
- 1993–1994: Rossin
- 1994–1999: Selle Italia

Major wins
- Cyclo-cross World Cup (1995–96) 3 individual wins (1995–96) Superprestige (1995–96) Mountain bike XC World Cup 2 individual wins (1995, 1997)
Medal record
Representing Italy
Men's cyclo-cross
World Championships
Bronze medal – third place	1996 Montreuil	Elite
Bronze medal – third place	1997 Munich	Elite
Men's mountain bike racing
World Championships
Bronze medal – third place	1997 Château-d'Œx	Cross-country

Luca Bramati (born 6 November 1968) is an Italian former cyclo-cross and cross-country mountain bike cyclist.

He most notably won the Cyclo-cross Superprestige and World Cup in the 1995–96 season. He also finished third in the 1996 and 1997 UCI Cyclo-cross World Championships, as well as third in the 1997 UCI Mountain Bike World Championships. Bramati also competed at the 1996 Summer Olympics in the Cross-country event.

== Major results ==
=== Cyclo-cross ===
1986–1987
5th UCI World Junior Championships
1992–1993
3rd National Championships
3rd Parabiago
1993–1994
2nd Silvelle
1994–1995
2nd National Championships
2nd Parabiago
Superprestige

3rd Silvelle

3rd Hombrechtikon
1995–1996
1st Overall UCI World Cup

1st Wangen
1st Heerlen
1st Variano di Basiliano
2nd Igorre
3rd Loenhout
4th Praha

1st Overall Superprestige

1st Overijse
1st Wetzikon
2nd Plzeň
2nd Asper-Gavere
2nd Silvelle
2nd Milan
2nd Sint-Michielsgestel
2nd Harnes

1st Dijon
2nd National Championships
2nd Parabiago
2nd Zürich
3rd UCI World Championships
1996–1997
Superprestige

1st Overijse
1st Wetzikon
3rd Harnes

1st Padova
2nd National Championships
3rd UCI World Championships
UCI World Cup

3rd Praha

3rd Parabiago
1997–1998
1st Gabbice
3rd Dagmersellen
UCI World Cup

5th Eschenbach

1998–1999
2nd National Championships
2nd Pistoia
3rd Solbiate Olona
1999–2000
1st Serramazzoni
1st Bolzano
2nd National Championships
2nd Milan
2000–2001
3rd National Championships
3rd Pontedera
2001–2002
2nd National Championships
3rd Aigle

=== Mountain bike ===
1995
UCI XC World Cup

1st Rome

2nd Cross-country, UEC European Championships
1996
8th Cross-country, Olympic Games
1997
UCI XC World Cup

1st Napa Valley

2nd Cross-country, UEC European Championships
3rd Cross-country, UCI World Championships
