= 2013 UCI Cyclo-cross World Championships =

Cyclo-cross championship

- Venue: (United States) Louisville, Kentucky, USA
- Date: February 2, 2013
- Nations participating: 21
- Cyclists participating: 152
- Events: 4

The 2013 UCI Cyclo-cross World Championships was the World Championship for cyclo-cross. It took place at Eva Bandman Park in Louisville, Kentucky, USA on Saturday, February 2, 2013. It was the first ever cyclo-cross world championship held outside of Europe. As in past years, four events were held. These world championships were mostly dominated by Belgium and Netherlands who, combined, won nine of the twelve possible medals and all of the gold medals.

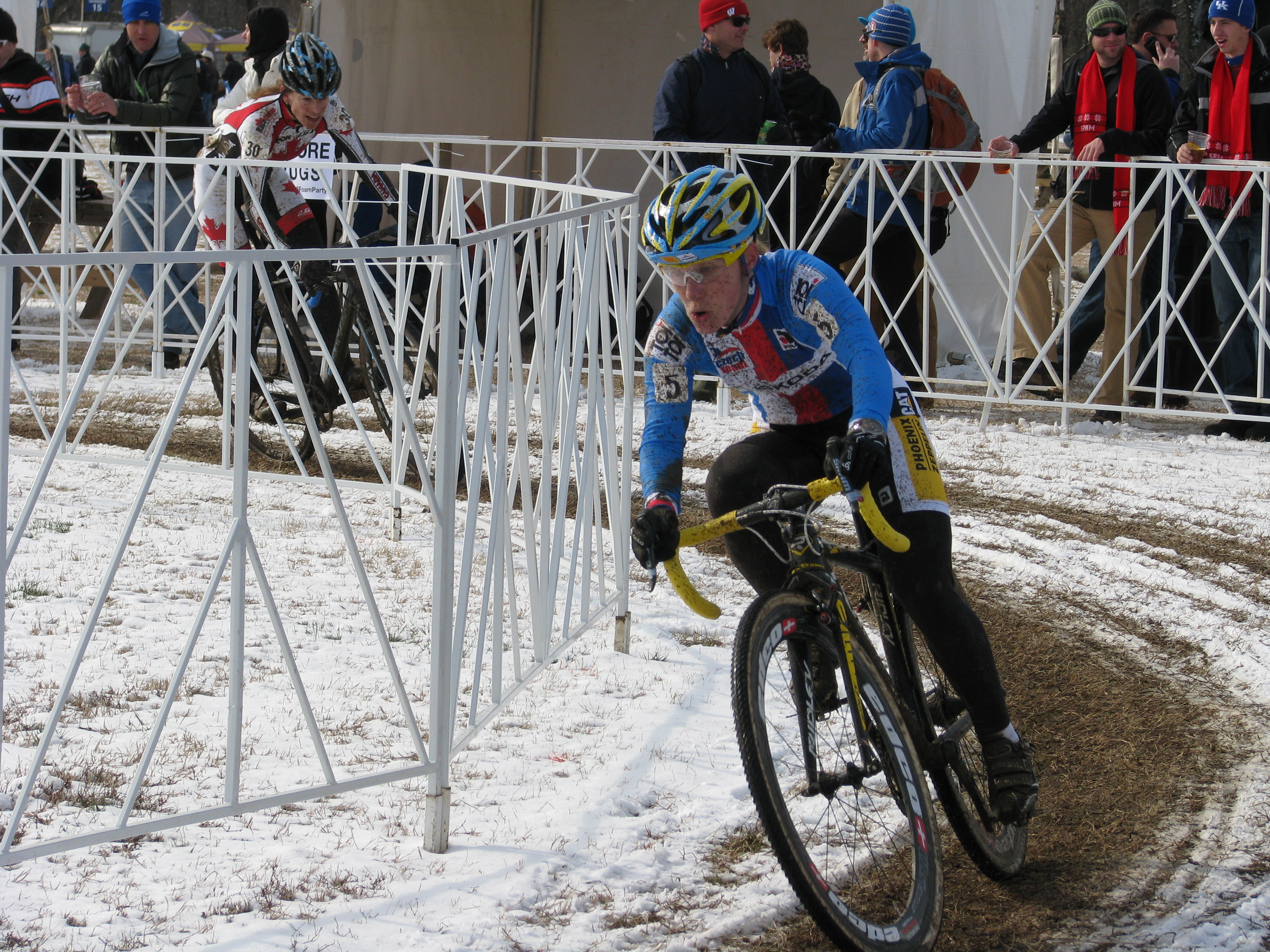
Pavla Havlíková during the women's elite race

== Schedule ==
The original schedule was set to hold four events spread out over two days. Due to rising water levels in the Ohio River and Beargrass Creek, which were predicted to flood low-lying parts of the venue by the morning of February 3, the UCI decided on Friday, February 1 to hold all the races on Saturday, February 2.

The event organizers arranged for a temporary barrier to be erected to keep floodwaters from reaching the course on Saturday. In addition, the rider presentation, scheduled for the evening of February 1 at the Fourth Street Live! entertainment complex in downtown Louisville, was canceled. As a result of the schedule change, all four newly crowned world champions were able to attend the Louisville Foam Party.

- Saturday February 2, 2013
  - 9:45/14:45 Men's Juniors
  - 11:00/16:00 Women's Elite
  - 12:30/17:30 Men's Under 23
  - 14:30/19:30 Men's Elite

All times in Eastern Standard Time, followed by UTC.

=== Original ===
- Saturday February 2, 2013
  - 11:00/16:00 Men's Juniors
  - 14:30/19:30 Men's Under 23
- Sunday February 3, 2013
  - 11:00/16:00 Women's Elite
  - 14:30/19:30 Men's Elite

All times in Eastern Standard Time, followed by UTC.

== Medal table ==
| Rank | Nation | Gold | Silver | Bronze | Total |
|---|---|---|---|---|---|
| 1 | Netherlands (NED) | 3 | 1 | 1 | 5 |
| 2 | Belgium (BEL) | 1 | 2 | 1 | 4 |
| 3 | United States (USA) | 0 | 1 | 0 | 1 |
| 4 | Czech Republic (CZE) | 0 | 0 | 1 | 1 |
| 4 | France (FRA) | 0 | 0 | 1 | 1 |
| Totals (5 entries) | | 4 | 4 | 4 | 12 |

== Medal summary ==
| Event | Gold | | Silver | | Bronze | |
|---|---|---|---|---|---|---|
Men's events
| Men's elite race | Sven Nys; Belgium | 1h 05' 35" | Klaas Vantornout; Belgium | + 2" | Lars van der Haar; Netherlands | + 25" |
| Men's under-23 race | Mike Teunissen; Netherlands | 48' 40" | Wietse Bosmans; Belgium | + 14" | Wout Van Aert; Belgium | + 22" |
| Men's junior race | Mathieu van der Poel; Netherlands | 40' 47" | Martijn Budding; Netherlands | + 57" | Adam Ťoupalík; Czech Republic | + 1' 19" |
Women's events
| Women's elite race | Marianne Vos; Netherlands | 43' 00" | Katie Compton; United States | + 1' 34" | Lucie Chainel-Lefèvre; France | + 2' 10" |
