= Tomáš Kopecký (cyclist) =

Czech professional road cyclist

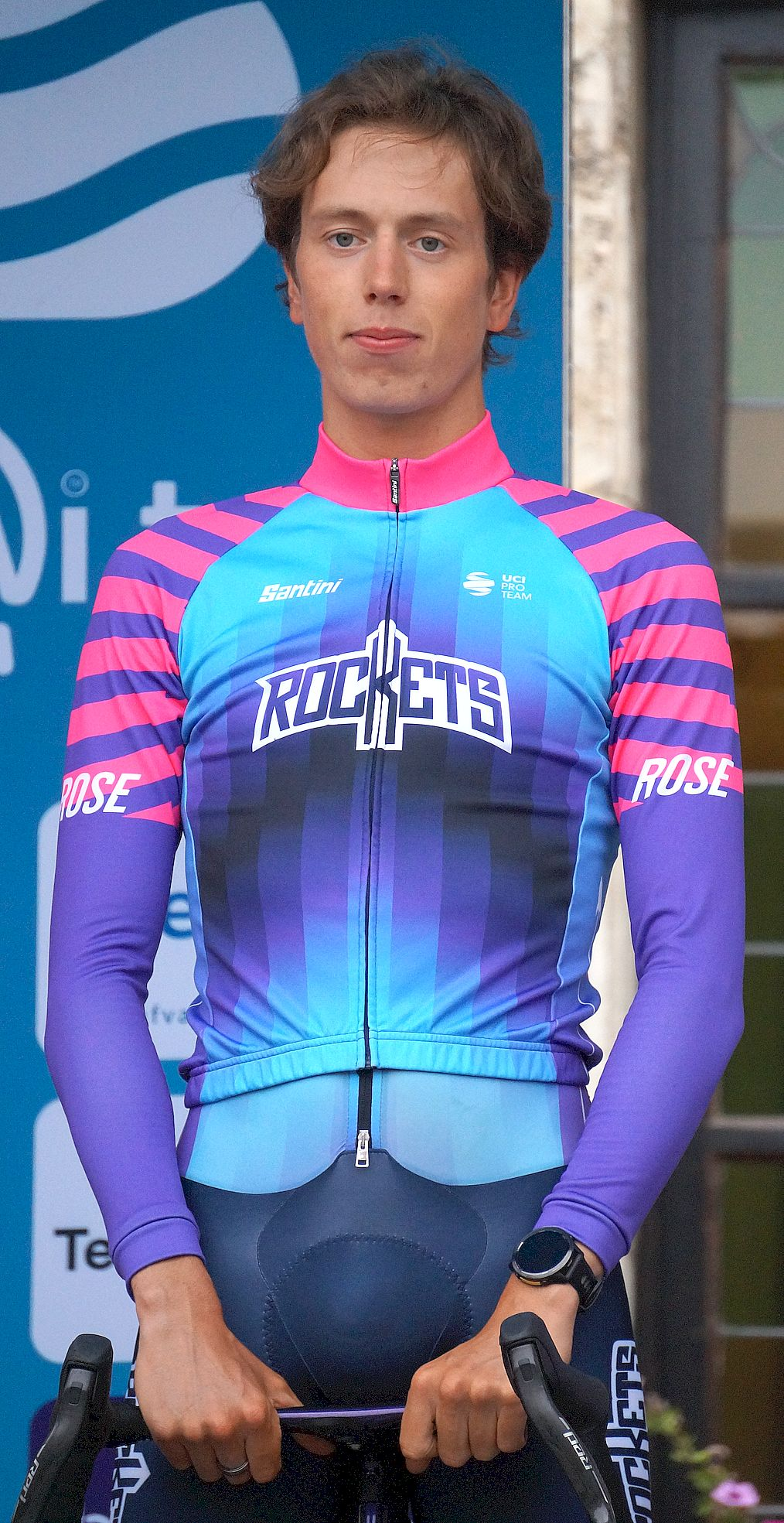
- Tomáš Kopecký in 2026

Personal information
- Full name: Tomáš Kopecký
- Born: 8 April 2000 (age 26) Darlington, Great Britain
- Height: 1.91 m (6 ft 3 in)
- Weight: 73 kg (161 lb)

Cycling career
- Sport: Cycling
- Current team: Unibet Rose Rockets
- Discipline: Road
- Role: Rider
- Rider type: All-rounder

Amateur teams
- 2018: Acrog–Balen BC Junior
- 2021: Acrog–Tormans

Professional teams
- 2019–2020: Pauwels Sauzen–Bingoal
- 2022: Abloc CT
- 2023–: TDT–Unibet Cycling Team
Medal record
Representing Czech Republic
Men's cyclo-cross
World Championships
Silver medal – second place	2018 Valkenburg	Junior
European Championships
Silver medal – second place	2017 Tabor	Junior

Tomáš Kopecký (born 8 April 2000) is a Czech road and former cyclo-cross cyclist, who currently rides for UCI ProTeam Unibet Rose Rockets. His brother Matyáš and sister Julia are also professional cyclists.

== Major results ==
=== Cyclo-cross ===
2015–2016
1st Koksijde
1st Koppenberg
1st Ronse
1st Rhenen
1st Amersfoort
1st Moergestel
2016–2017
1st Grand Prix Möbel Alvisse Leudelange
Toi Toi Cup

2nd Mladá Boleslav

Junior Superprestige

3rd Spa-Francorchamps
4th Middelkerke
4th Diegem

2017–2018
1st National Junior Championships
1st Overall UCI Junior World Cup

1st Heusden-Zolder
1st Bogense
2nd Zeven
3rd Nommay
3rd Koksijde
4th Hoogerheide

1st Overall Junior Superprestige

2nd Middelkerke
2nd Gavere
2nd Ruddervoorde
2nd Zonhoven
3rd Diegem
4th Hoogstraten
4th Boom

1st Hulst
2nd UEC European Junior Championships
2nd UCI World Junior Championships
2018–2019
1st National Under-23 Championships
4th UCI World Under-23 Championships
UCI Under-23 World Cup

4th Pontchâteau

3rd Gullegem
2019–2020
1st National Under-23 Championships
2nd National Championships Elite
Toi Toi Cup

3rd Uničov

=== Road ===
2016
1st Road race, National Junior Championships
1st Kumtich-Tienen
2017
1st Omloop der 3 provincies
2018
3rd Time trial, National Junior Championships
2021
1st Time trial, National Under-23 Championships
1st Overall Ronde van Vlaams-Brabant

1st Young rider classification
1st Stage 3 (ITT)

2022
1st Wim Hendriks Trofee
2nd Rutland–Melton CiCLE Classic
2nd PWZ Zuidenveld Tour
3rd Paris–Tours Espoirs
5th HLB van Daal Eurode Omloop
7th Overall Olympia's Tour
7th Memorial Briek Schotte
7th Sluitingsprijs Putte-Kapellen
8th Overall ZLM Tour
2023
1st Stage 3 Kreiz Breizh Elites
9th Arno Wallaard Memorial
2024
7th Overall Four Days of Dunkirk
2025
4th Time trial, National Championships
7th Grand Prix de Denain
2026
7th Overall Danmark Rundt
