= Kamil Ausbuher =

Personal information
- Born: 7 August 1975 (age 51) Podbořany, Czechoslovakia

Cycling career
- Sport: Cycling
- Current team: Retired
- Discipline: Cyclo-cross
- Role: Rider

Kamil Ausbuher (born 7 August 1975) is a Czech former professional cyclo-cross cyclist. He won the UCI Junior Cyclo-cross World Championships in 1993 and the Tábor round of the 2004–2005 UCI Cyclo-cross World Cup. He retired in 2010.

== Major results ==
1992–1993
1st UCI World Junior Championships
1993–1994
3rd UCI World Junior Championships
1994–1995
5th UCI World Under-23 Championships
1996–1997
3rd National Under-23 Championships
1997–1998
3rd National Championships
3rd Igorre
1999–2000
3rd National Championships
2000–2001
2nd Prague
2001–2002
3rd National Championships
2002–2003
1st Hittnau
2003–2004
1st National Championships
1st Overall Budvar Cup

1st Česká Lípa
1st Lostice

2004–2005
UCI World Cup

1st Tábor

2004–2005
UCI World Cup

5th Kalmthout

2009–2010
1st Loštice
1st Niederanven
