= 2001 UCI Cyclo-cross World Championships =

Cyclo-cross championship

- Venue: Tábor, Czech Republic
- Date: February 3–4, 2001
- Coordinates: 49°24′52″N 14°39′28″E
- Events: 4

The 2001 UCI Cyclo-cross World Championships were held in Tábor, Czech Republic on Saturday February 3 and Sunday February 4, 2001.

== Schedule ==
- Saturday February 3, 2001
  - 11:00 Women's Elite
  - 14:00 Men's Under 23
- Sunday February 4, 2001
  - 11:00 Men's Juniors
  - 14:00 Men's Elite

== Medal summary ==
| Event | Gold | | Silver | | Bronze | |
|---|---|---|---|---|---|---|
Men's events
| Men's elite race | Erwin Vervecken (BEL) | 1h 01' 54" | Petr Dlask (CZE) | + 1" | Mario De Clercq (BEL) | + 14" |
| Men's under-23 race | Sven Vanthourenhout (BEL) | 51' 55" | Tomas Trunschka (CZE) | + 16" | David Kasek (CZE) | + 36" |
| Men's junior race | Martin Bína (CZE) | 38' 54" | Radomír Šimůnek (CZE) | + 19" | Jan Kunta (CZE) | + 19" |
Women's events
| Women's elite race | Hanka Kupfernagel (GER) | 28' 29" | Corine Dorland (NED) | + 35" | Daphny van den Brand (NED) | + 41" |

== Medal table ==
| Rank | Nation | Gold | Silver | Bronze | Total |
|---|---|---|---|---|---|
| 1 | Belgium (BEL) | 2 | 0 | 1 | 3 |
| 2 | Czech Republic (CZE) | 1 | 3 | 2 | 6 |
| 3 | Germany (GER) | 1 | 0 | 0 | 1 |
| 4 | Netherlands (NED) | 0 | 1 | 1 | 2 |
| Totals (4 entries) | | 4 | 4 | 4 | 12 |

== Men's Elite ==
- Held on Sunday February 4, 2001

| RANK | 2001 UCI CYCLO-CROSS WORLD CHAMPIONSHIPS | TIME |
|---|---|---|
| | Erwin Vervecken (BEL) | 01:01:54 |
| | Petr Dlask (CZE) | + 0.01 |
| | Mario De Clercq (BEL) | + 0.14 |
| 4. | Sven Nys (BEL) | + 1.07 |
| 5. | Jiri Pospisil (CZE) | + 1.11 |
| 6. | Henrik Djernis (DEN) | + 1.29 |
| 7. | Gerben de Knegt (NED) | + 1.41 |
| 8. | Camiel van den Bergh (NED) | + 1.49 |
| 9. | Tom Vannoppen (BEL) | + 2.25 |
| 10. | Vaclav Jezek (CZE) | + 2.36 |

== Women's Elite ==
- Held on Saturday February 3, 2001

| RANK | 2001 UCI CYCLO-CROSS WORLD CHAMPIONSHIPS | TIME |
|---|---|---|
| | Hanka Kupfernagel (GER) | 00:28:29 |
| | Corine Dorland (NED) | + 0:35 |
| | Daphny van den Brand (NED) | + 0:41 |
| 4. | Ann Grande (USA) | + 0:45 |
| 5. | Laurence Leboucher (FRA) | + 0:47 |
| 6. | Louise Robinson (GBR) | + 1:02 |
| 7. | Nicole Cooke (GBR) | + 1:06 |
| 8. | Debby Mansveld (NED) | + 1:08 |
| 9. | Rachel Ljoyd (USA) | + 1:18 |
| 10. | Reza Hormes-Ravenstijn (NED) | + 2:05 |
