= Jiří Pospíšil (cyclist) =

Personal information
- Born: 26 February 1973 (age 53) Bakov nad Jizerou, Czech Republic

Cycling career
- Sport: Cycling
- Current team: Retired
- Discipline: Cyclo-cross
- Role: Rider

Professional teams
- 1996–1997: Olpran
- 1998: Morati
- 2004–2005: Author
- 2005–2006: Stevens Racing Team
Medal record
Representing Czech Republic
Men's cyclo-cross
World Championships
| Silver medal – second place | 1991 Gieten | Junior race |

Jiří Pospíšil (born 26 February 1973) is a Czech former professional cyclo-cross cyclist.

== Major results ==
1990–1991
2nd UCI Junior World Championships
1995–1996
1st National Championships
1st Kolin
1st Kosumberg
UCI World Cup

3rd Igorre
3rd Prague

Superprestige

3rd Plzeň

1996–1997
1st Teplice
1st Sankt-Gallen
1st Loštice
1st Holé Vrchy
1st Magstadt
2nd National Championships
2nd Igorre
1997–1998
1st Igorre
1st Mladá Boleslav
1st Cologne
1st Holé Vrchy
1st Mladá Boleslav
2nd National Championships
1998–1999
1st National Championships
1st Podbořany
1st Náměšť nad Oslavou
1st Mladá Boleslav
1st Heřmanův Městec
1st Trèves
1st Orlová
2nd Igorre
9th UCI World Championships
1999–2000
1st Loštice
1st Ostelsheim
UCI World Cup

3rd Safenwil

2000–2001
1st Ostelsheim
1st Dagmersellen
2nd National Championships
3rd Igorre
3rd Pétange
3rd Steinmaur
5th UCI World Championships
2001–2002
1st National Championships
1st Overall Budvar Cup

1st Louny
1st Podbořany
1st Plzeň

1st Steinmaur
1st Ostelsheim
3rd Azencross
3rd Dagmersellen
2002–2003
1st Aigle
1st Podbořany
1st Loštice
1st Ostelsheim
1st Holé Vrchy
1st Zurich-Waid
1st Meilen
3rd Igorre
3rd Dagmersellen
9th UCI World Championships
2003–2004
1st Igorre
1st Ostelsheim
1st Podbořany
1st Meilen
1st Rüti
1st Holé Vrchy
UCI World Cup

2nd Sankt Wendel

2nd Lanarvily
2nd Grand Prix du Nouvel-An
3rd Grote Prijs De Ster
2004–2005
Budvar Cup

1st Podbořany
1st Hlinsko
3rd Loštice

1st Hittnau
1st Dagmersellen
1st Grand Prix des Assurances Axa
1st Holé Vrchy
1st Herford
1st Kayl
2nd GP Ayuntamiento de Ispaster
2005–2006
Budvar Cup

1st Podbořany
