= Václav Ježek (cyclist) =

Czech cyclist

Personal information
- Born: 8 March 2005 (age 21) Mladá Boleslav, Czech Republic

Cycling career
- Sport: Cycling
- Current team: Kasper Crypto4me
- Disciplines: Cyclo-cross; Road
- Role: Rider

Professional teams
- 2023–: Brilon Racing Team MB (cyclo-cross)
- 2026–: Kasper Crypto4me (road)

Václav Ježek (born 8 March 2005) is a Czech cyclo-cross and road cyclist, who currently rides for UCI Continental team Kasper Crypto4me.

He comes from Mladá Boleslav. His older brother and his father, also named Václav, are former cyclists.

== Major results ==
=== Cyclo-cross ===
2022–2023
2nd National Junior Championships
2023–2024
1st Topoľčianky
2nd Podbrezová
3rd Overall HSF System Cup
2024–2025
2nd National Championships
2nd Overall HSF System Cup

2nd Uničov
3rd Hlinsko
3rd Kolín
3rd Mladá Boleslav
3rd Rýmařov (C2)

2nd Central Bohemian Region
3rd Plzeň
2025–2026
1st Overall HSF System Cup

1st Holé Vrchy
1st Mladá Boleslav
1st Hlinsko
1st Jičín
1st Veselí nad Lužnicí
2nd Uničov

1st Topoľčianky
2nd National Championships
5th European Under-23 Championships

=== Road ===
2026 (1 pro win)
1st Overall Tour of Hellas

1st Young rider classification

1st Overall West Bohemia Tour
5th Road race, National Under-23 Road Championships
7th Overall Czech Tour
7th Grand Prix Vorarlberg
8th Grand Prix Poland
