= Suzanne Verhoeven =

Belgian cyclist

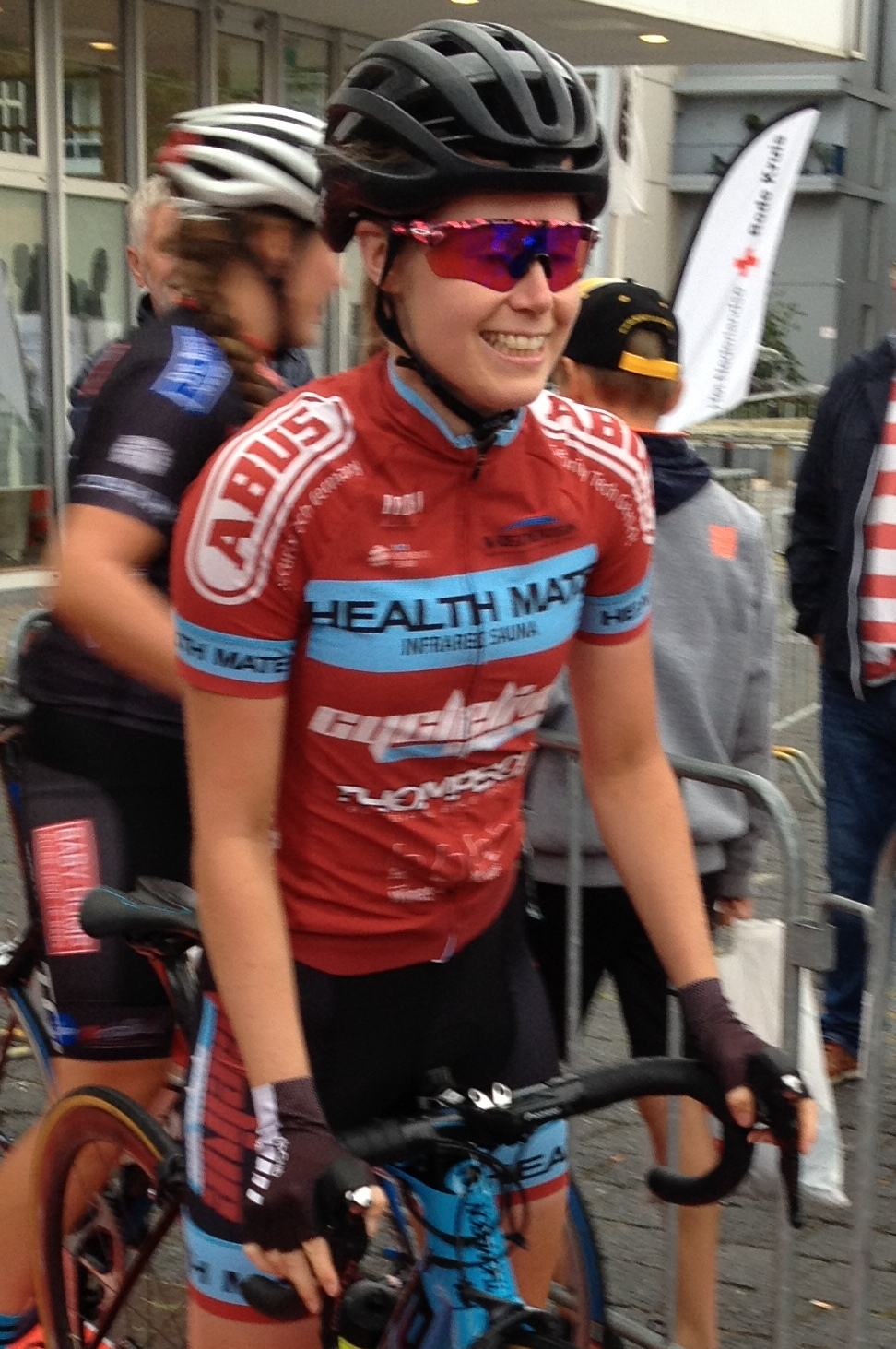
- Suzanne Verhoeven in 2019

Personal information
- Born: 8 May 1996 (age 30)

Cycling career
- Sport: Cycling
- Role: Rider

Professional team
- 2019: Health Mate–Cyclelive Team

Suzanne Verhoeven (born 8 May 1996) is a Belgian professional racing cyclist. She rode for the UCI Women's Team Health Mate–Cyclelive Team for the 2019 women's road cycling season. She is the daughter of Dutch former cyclist Nico Verhoeven.

== Major results ==
=== Cyclo-cross ===
2015–2016
3rd Marle
2017–2018
2nd Les Franqueses del Valles
2nd Sion
3rd Contern
2019–2020
Stockholm Weekend

1st Stockholm
1st Täby Park

National Trophy Series

3rd Crawley

2020–2021
Stockholm Weekend

1st Stockholm
1st Täby Park

Toi Toi Cup

2nd Rýmařov

2nd Gościęcin
2021–2022
1st Asker Day 1
2nd Ardooie
2nd Asker Day 2
Stockholm Weekend

2nd Täby Park
3rd Stockholm

Toi Toi Cup

3rd Mlada Boleslav

3rd Contern
3rd Illnau
3rd Oisterwijk
2022–2023
Stockholm Weekend

1st Täby Park
2nd Stockholm

1st Keila

=== Road ===
2018
4th Time trial, National Under-23 Championships
