= Radomír Šimůnek Jr. =

Czech former racing cyclist

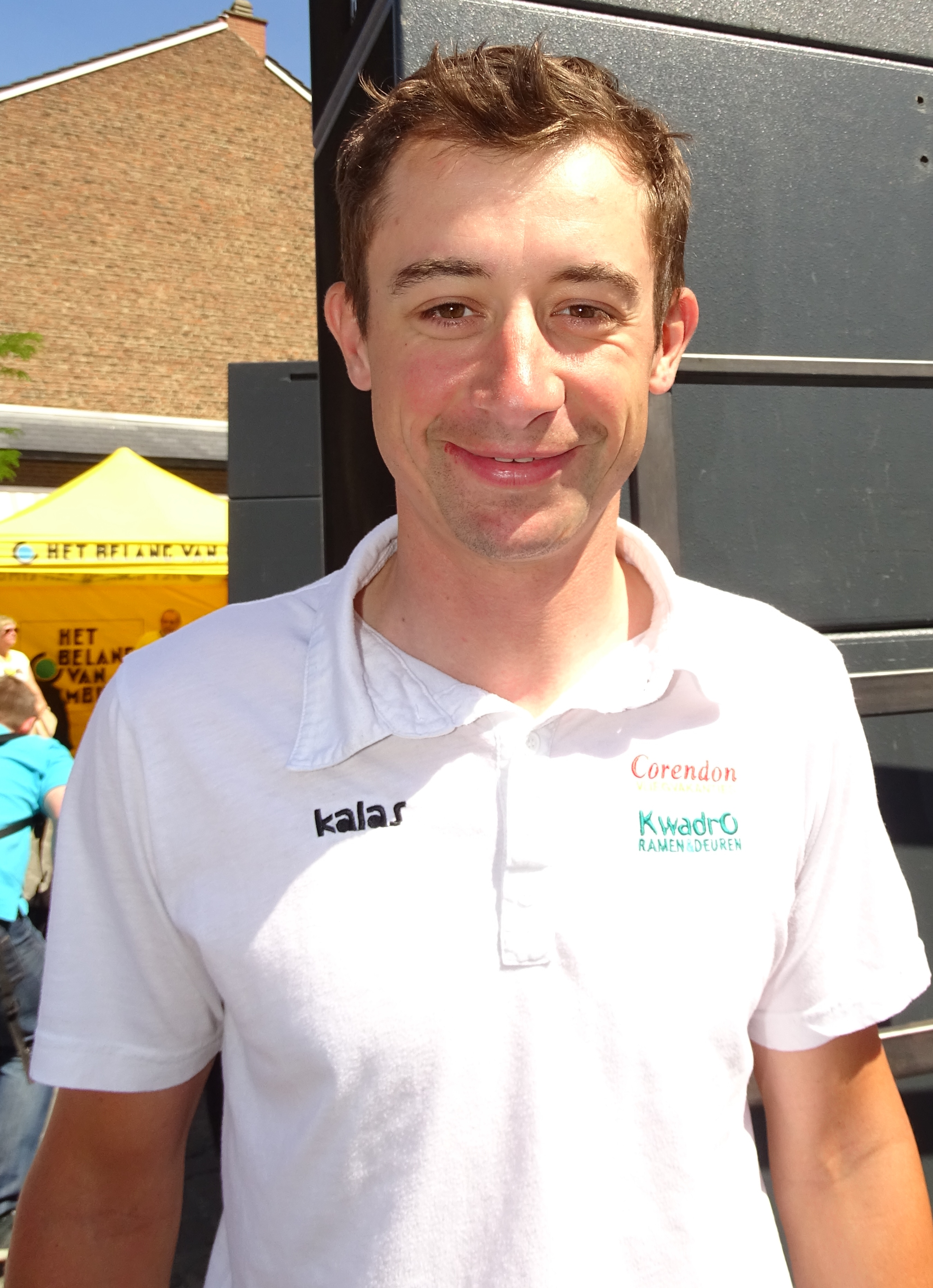
- Šimůnek in 2015

Personal information
- Full name: Radomír Šimůnek Jr.
- Born: 6 September 1983 (age 43) Jilemnice, Czechoslovakia
- Height: 1.81 m (5 ft 11 in)
- Weight: 70 kg (154 lb; 11 st 0 lb)

Cycling career
- Sport: Cycling
- Current team: Retired
- Disciplines: Cyclo-cross; Road
- Role: Rider

Amateur team
- 2013: Kwadro–Stannah

Professional teams
- 2005: MrBookmaker.com–SportsTech
- 2006–2008: Palmans–Collstrop
- 2009–2012: BKCP–Powerplus
- 2014–2016: Kwadro–Stannah
Medal record
Representing Czech Republic
Men's cyclo-cross
World Championships
Silver medal – second place	2001 Tábor	Junior Men's Race
Silver medal – second place	2005 Sankt Wendel	Under-23 Men's Race

Radomír Šimůnek Jr. (Czech pronunciation: [ˈradomiːr ˈʃɪmuːnɛk], born 6 September 1983) is a Czech former professional racing cyclist. Born in Plzeň, Šimůnek participates mainly in cyclo-cross and has won a silver medal at the Junior and under-23 World Championships. His father, also named Radomír, was also a cyclo-cross racer.

== Major results ==
1999–2000
1st National Junior Championships
2000–2001
2nd UCI World Junior Championships
3rd Junior Wetzikon
2002–2003
Under-23 Superprestige

1st Vorselaar

2nd National Under-23 Championships
2003–2004
UCI Under-23 World Cup

1st Sankt Wendel

3rd National Championships
Under-23 Superprestige

3rd Diegem

3rd Wetzikon Under-23
2004–2005
Budvar Cup

1st Loštice
3rd Podbořany
3rd Plzen
3rd Česká Lípa

2nd UCI World Under-23 Championships
2nd Overall Under-23 Superprestige

1st Hamme-Zogge
1st Sint-Michielsgestel
1st Diegem
2nd Gieten
3rd Vorselaar

UCI Under-23 World Cup

2nd Hofstade
2nd Wetzikon

2nd Azencross Under-23
3rd National Championships
3rd Kalmthout Under-23
2005–2006
3rd National Championships
Budvar Cup

3rd Podbořany

UCI World Cup

5th Hoogerheide

2006–2007
UCI World Cup

1st Tábor

2nd Berlin
2nd Asteasu
3rd National Championships
Budvar Cup

3rd Podbořany

2007–2008
1st Scheldecross Antwerpen
2nd National Championships
Superprestige

2nd Diegem
2nd Vorselaar

2nd Nommay
2nd Sint-Niklaas
Toi Toi Cup

3rd Uničov
3rd Plzen

3rd Roubaix
3rd Asteasu
5th UCI World Championships
2008–2009
1st Lebbeke
2nd National Championships
3rd Azencross
3rd Scheldecross Antwerpen
3rd Podbořany
3rd Sint-Niklaas
2009–2010
2nd Sint-Niklaas
Superprestige

3rd Vorselaar

UCI World Cup

5th Heusden-Zolder

2010–2011
1st Scheldecross Antwerpen
1st Tábor
Superprestige

2nd Gieten

2011–2012
2nd National Championships
UCI World Cup

3rd Liévin

3rd Dottignies
2012–2013
Toi Toi Cup

1st Loštice

2nd Cauberg
2nd Rucphen
2013–2014
UCI World Cup

5th Nommay

2015–2016
1st National Championships
Toi Toi Cup

1st Louny
1st Mladá Boleslav
3rd Uničov
3rd Slaný

QianSen Trophy

2nd Qiongzhong
3rd Yanqing

3rd Maldegem
3rd Rucphen
2016–2017
Toi Toi Cup

1st Jabkenice
