= Jan Nesvadba =

Czech cyclo-cross cyclist

Personal information
- Born: 4 August 1991 (age 35) Roprachtice, Czech Republic

Cycling career
- Sport: Cycling
- Disciplines: Cyclo-cross, mountain bike
- Role: Rider

Professional team
- 2018–2019: ČEZ Cyklo Team Tábor

Jan Nesvadba (born 4 August 1991) is a Czech cyclo-cross cyclist.

== Major results ==
=== Cyclo-cross ===
2007–2008
1st National Junior Championships
2010–2011
Toi Toi Cup

3rd Mnichovo Hradiště

2011–2012
Toi Toi Cup

2nd Holé Vrchy
3rd Kolín

Under-23 GvA Trophy

3rd Oudenaarde

2012–2013
2nd Gościęcin
2016–2017
2nd Overall Toi Toi Cup

1st Kolín
2nd Jabkenice
2nd Holé Vrchy
3rd Mladá Boleslav

3rd National Championships
2017–2018
2nd National Championships
2nd Overall Toi Toi Cup

2nd Uničov
2nd Milovice
3rd Holé Vrchy
3rd Hlinsko

2018–2019
1st Overall Toi Toi Cup

1st Hlinsko
1st Jičín
2nd Jabkenice
2nd Slaný
3rd Mladá Boleslav
3rd Kolín

3rd National Championships
3rd Overall EKZ CrossTour
2019–2020
2nd Overall Toi Toi Cup

2nd Jabkenice
3rd Kolín

=== Mountain bike ===
2013
3rd Mixed relay, European Mountain Bike Championships
2014
World University Mountain Bike Championshipd

2nd Time trial
3rd Cross-country
