= 1995 UCI Cyclo-cross World Championships =

Cyclo-cross championship

- Location within Switzerland
- Venue: Eschenbach, Switzerland
- Date: 29 January 1995
- Coordinates: 47°14′N 8°55′E
- Events: 2

The 1995 UCI Cyclo-cross World Championships were held in Eschenbach, Switzerland on 29 January 1995.

== Medal summary ==
Event	Gold		Silver		Bronze	
Men's elite race	Dieter Runkel (SUI)	57' 44"	Richard Groenendaal (NED)	+ 0:37	Beat Wabel (SUI)	+ 0:57
Men's junior race	Zdeněk Mlynář (CZE)	40' 01"	Guillaume Benoist (FRA)	+ 0:12	Stefan Bünter (SUI)	+ 0:16

== Results ==
=== Elite ===
Rank	Rider	Nation	Time
1	Dieter Runkel	Switzerland	57' 44"
2	Richard Groenendaal	Netherlands	+ 0:37
3	Beat Wabel	Switzerland	+ 0:57
4	Adrie van der Poel	Netherlands	+ 1:18
5	Roger Honegger	Switzerland	+ 1:26
6	Peter Van Santvliet	Belgium	+ 1:43
7	Dominique Arnould	France	+ 1:45
8	Jan Østergaard	Denmark	+ 2:01
9	Daniele Pontoni	Italy	+ 2:11
10	Emmanuel Magnien	France	+ 2:30

=== Junior ===
Rank	Rider	Nation	Time
1	Zdeněk Mlynář	Czech Republic	40' 01"
2	Guillaume Benoist	France	+ 0:12
3	Stefan Bünter	Switzerland	+ 0:16
4	Miguel Martinez	France	+ 0:18
5	Pavel Prošek	Czech Republic	+ 0:31
6	Maarten Nijland	Netherlands	+ 0:47
7	Patrick Dubacher	Switzerland	+ 0:47
8	Roger Zweifel	Switzerland	+ 0:54
9	Robby Pelgrims	Belgium	+ 0:59
10	Fabrizio Dall'Oste	Italy	+ 1:06
