= Martin Bína =

Czech cyclo-cross cyclist

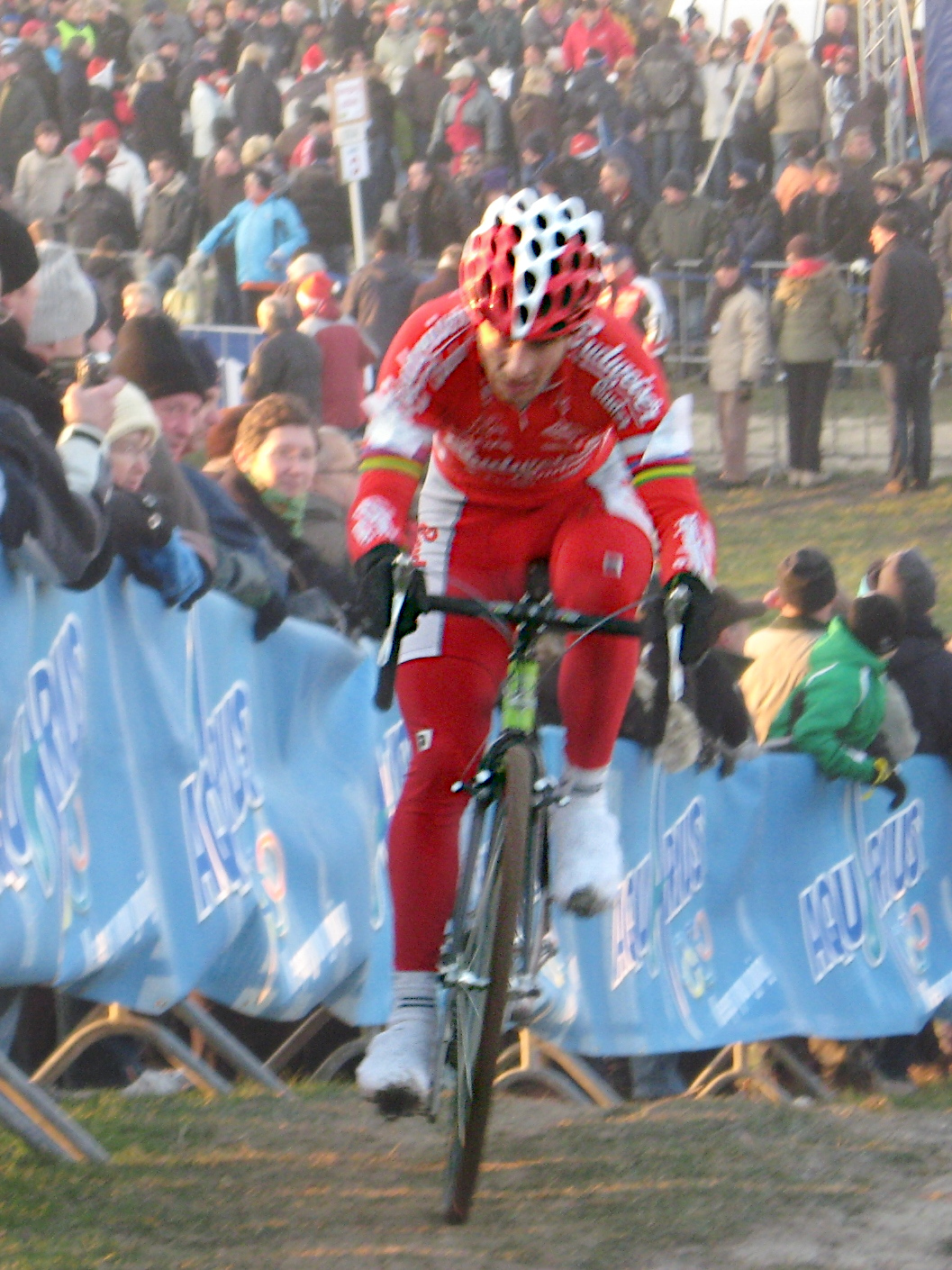

Personal information
- Born: 21 May 1983 (age 43) Mladá Boleslav, Czech Republic

Cycling career
- Sport: Cycling
- Current team: Retired
- Disciplines: Cyclo-cross; Road
- Role: Rider

Amateur teams
- 1991–1998: Spartak Pelhřimov
- 1998–2001: CT Budvar Tábor

Professional teams
- 2002–2006: Author
- 2008–2013: Cyklo Tábor
- 2013–2015: Kwadro–Stannah

Martin Bína (born 21 May 1983) is a Czech former cyclo-cross cyclist.

== Major results ==
=== Cyclo-cross ===
2000–2001
1st UCI World Junior Championships
2001–2002
1st National Under-23 Championships
2002–2003
1st National Under-23 Championships
2003–2004
2nd UEC European Under-23 Championships
2004–2005
1st Overall UCI Under-23 World Cup

1st Pijnacker
1st Wetzikon

3rd U23 European Cyclo-cross Championships
2005-2006
Budvar Cup

2nd Plzen
3rd Česká Lípa
3rd Hlinsko

2008–2009
1st Overall Toi Toi Cup

1st Uničov
1st Louny
1st Česká Lípa
2nd Hlinsko
3rd Holé Vrchy

1st Grand Prix Olomouc
2nd Velka cena skupiny CEZ
UCI World Cup

3rd Tábor

2009–2010
Toi Toi Cup

1st Holé Vrchy
1st Kolín
1st Mnichovo Hradiště
2nd Hlinsko
2nd Stříbro
2nd Podbořany

1st Grand Prix Emiagency Olomouc
3rd National Championships
4th UCI World Championships
2012–2013
UCI World Cup

1st Hoogerheide

1st Overall Toi Toi Cup

1st Holé Vrchy
1st Kolín
1st Hlinsko
1st Mladá Boleslav
1st Uničov
2nd Loštice

1st Cauberg Cyclo-cross
1st International Cyclocross Marikovská Dolina
1st International Cyclocross Finančné centrum
2nd National Championships
3rd GP Stad Eeklo
10th UCI World Championships
2013–2014
1st National Championships
BPost Bank Trophy

2nd Ronse

=== Road ===
2012
6th Overall Okolo Jižních Čech

1st Prologue

2013
2nd National Road Race Championships
