= Lubomír Petruš =

Czech cyclist

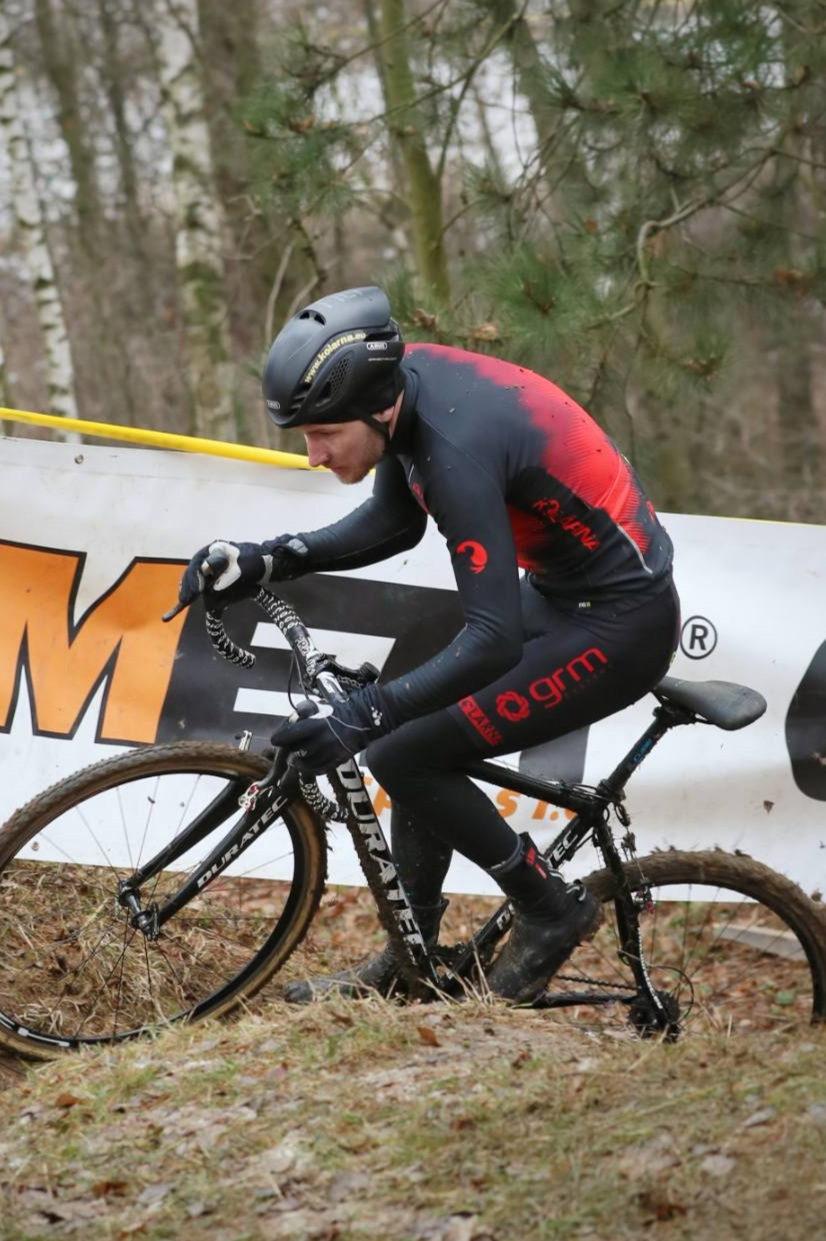

Personal information
- Full name: Lubomír Petruš
- Born: 17 July 1990 (age 36) Vrbno pod Pradědem, Czech Republic
- Height: 1.77 m (5 ft 10 in)
- Weight: 58 kg (128 lb)

Cycling career
- Sport: Cycling
- Disciplines: Cyclo-cross; Road
- Role: Rider

Amateur team
- 2015–2020: EthicSport Prestige

Professional teams
- 2009–2015: BKCP–Powerplus
- 2020: Alpecin–Fenix (stagiaire)
- 2021: Alpecin–Fenix Development Team

Lubomír Petruš (born 17 July 1990) is a Czech cyclo-cross and road cyclist, who last rode for UCI Continental team Alpecin–Fenix Development Team. He represented his nation in the men's elite event at the 2016 UCI Cyclo-cross World Championships in Heusden-Zolder.

== Major results ==
=== Cyclo-cross ===
2006–2007
2nd National Junior Championships
2007–2008
1st European Junior Championships
1st National Junior Championships
3rd UCI Junior World Championships
2008–2009
2nd National Under-23 Championships
Under-23 Superprestige

3rd Gieten

3rd Baal Under-23
2009–2010
Under-23 GvA Trophy

1st Namur

UCI Under-23 World Cup

2nd Treviso

2nd Neerpelt Under-23
2011–2012
2nd Gościęcin
2nd Differdange
Toi Toi Cup

2nd Hlinsko
3rd Holé Vrchy

2012–2013
Toi Toi Cup

3rd Loštice

2015–2016
1st Gościęcin
Toi Toi Cup

2nd Milovice
2nd Hlinsko

2016–2017
2nd Ternitz

=== Road ===
2007
3rd Road race, National Junior Road Championships
2009
2nd Overall Tour Alsace
2010
2nd Road race, National Under-23 Road Championships
2012
1st Stage 2 Tour de Liège
10th Overall Thüringen Rundfahrt U23
