= Michael Boroš =

Czech cyclist

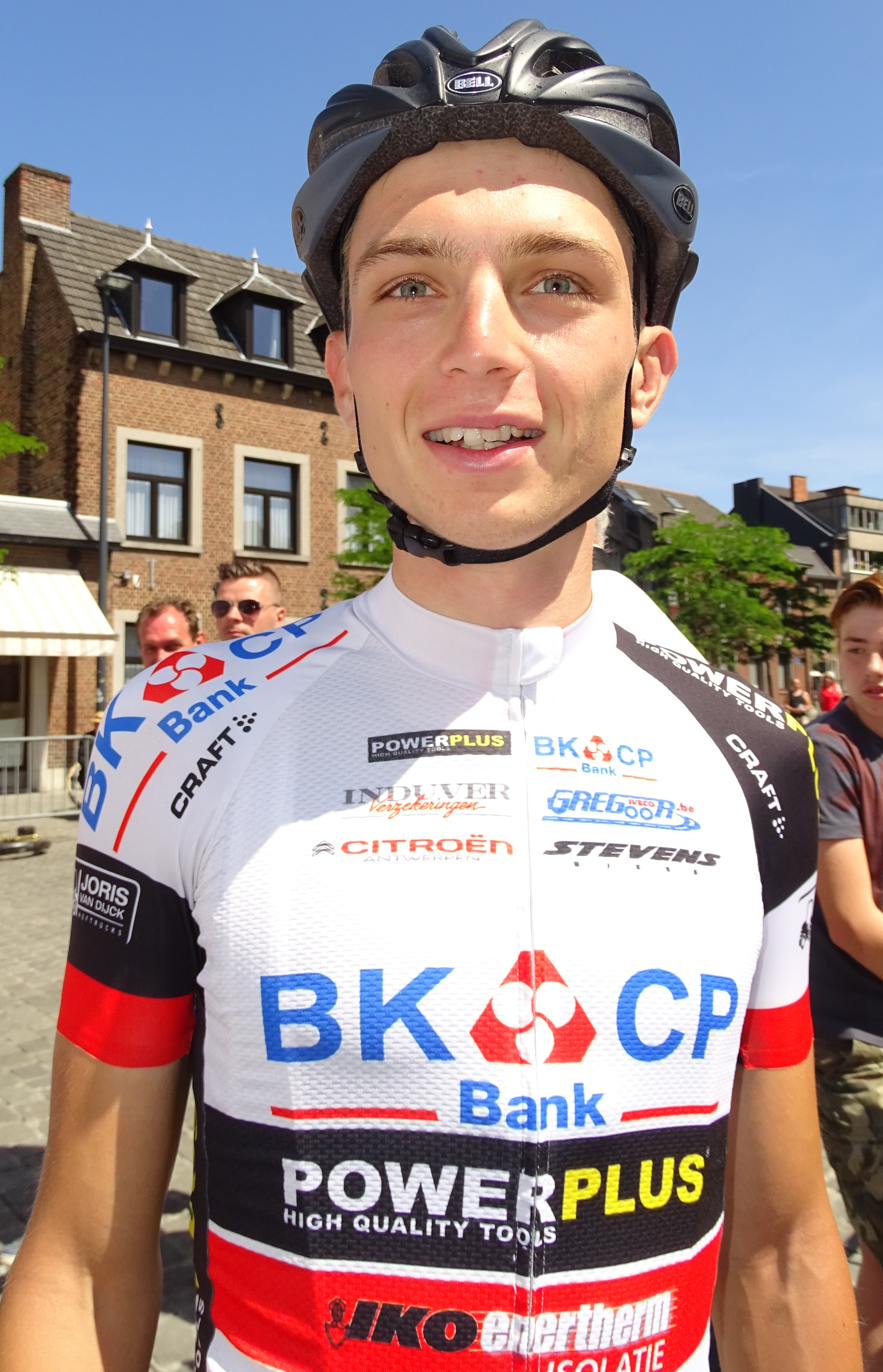

Personal information
- Born: 9 August 1992 (age 34) Prague, Czechoslovakia
- Height: 1.79 m (5 ft 10 in)
- Weight: 66 kg (146 lb)

Cycling career
- Sport: Cycling
- Current team: Kasper Crypto4me
- Disciplines: Cyclo-cross; Road
- Role: Rider

Amateur teams
- 2019: Creafin–Tüv Süd
- 2019–2021: ČEZ Cyklo Team Tábor

Professional teams
- 2015–2016: BKCP–Powerplus
- 2016: ERA–Murprotec
- 2017–2018: Pauwels Sauzen–Vastgoedservice
- 2021: Cross Team Legendre
- 2022–: Elkov–Kasper

Michael Boroš (born 9 August 1992) is a Czech cyclo-cross and road cyclist, who currently rides for UCI Continental team Kasper Crypto4me. He represented his nation in the men's elite event at the 2016 UCI Cyclo-cross World Championships in Heusden-Zolder.

== Major results ==
=== Cyclo-cross ===
2012–2013
1st Podbrezová
2nd Ternitz
2013–2014
Toi Toi Cup

1st Hlinsko
1st Slaný

2nd National Championships
2014–2015
1st Stadl-Paura
2nd Overall Toi Toi Cup

1st Milovice
1st Uničov
1st Loštice

3rd National Championships
2015–2016
2nd National Championships
2016–2017
1st National Championships
EKZ CrossTour

3rd Baden

2017–2018
1st National Championships
2018–2019
1st National Championships
3rd Iowa City Race 3
2019–2020
1st Overall Toi Toi Cup

1st Holé Vrchy
1st Jabkenice

2nd Munich
2nd Vittorio Veneto
3rd Fae' di Oderzo
2020–2021
1st Overall Toi Toi Cup

1st Mladá Boleslav
1st Rýmařov

2021–2022
1st National Championships
1st Overall Toi Toi Cup

1st Mladá Boleslav
1st Slaný
1st Rýmařov
1st Veselí nad Lužnicí
2nd Hlinsko

2022–2023
1st National Championships
Toi Toi Cup

1st Holé Vrchy
1st Hlinsko

2023–2024
1st National Championships
Toi Toi Cup

1st Holé Vrchy
1st Hlinsko
1st Jičín
1st Mladá Boleslav

=== Road ===
2010
4th Overall Oberösterreich Juniorenrundfahrt
2014
7th Overall Course de la Paix U23
2019
5th Road race, National Road Championships
2022
1st Memoriał Jana Magiery
2nd Memorial Henryka Łasaka
National Road Championships

4th Road race
5th Time trial

2023
1st GP Vorarlberg
Visegrad 4 Bicycle Race

3rd GP Slovakia
10th GP Czech Republic
10th GP Poland

2024
2nd GP Vorarlberg
10th Overall Tour of Malopolska
