= GP Mario De Clercq =

Grand Prix Mario De Clercq
Race details
- Region: Ronse, Belgium
- Local name(s): Hotondcross, GP Mario De Clercq
- Discipline: Cyclo-cross
- Competition: BPost Bank Trophy

History
- First edition: 2000
- Editions: 15 (as of 2019)
- First winner: Mario De Clercq (BEL)
- Most wins: Mario De Clercq (BEL) (3 wins) Sven Nys (BEL) (3 wins)
- Most recent: Toon Aerts (BEL)

The GP Mario De Clercq is a cyclo-cross race held since 2000 in Ronse, Belgium with a break between 2004 and 2010. The track was drawn by former world champion Mario De Clercq, name holder of this event and manager of Sunweb-Napoleon Games. From the 2011–2012 season to the 2017–2018 season, it was a part of the BPost Bank Trophy.

== Past winners ==
=== Men ===
Year	Country	Rider	Team
2000	Belgium	Mario De Clercq	Palmans–Collstrop–MrBookmaker.be
2001	Belgium	Mario De Clercq	Palmans–Collstrop–MrBookmaker.be
2002	Belgium	Mario De Clercq	Domo–Farm Frites
2003	Belgium	Ben Berden	Vlaanderen 2002
2004	Czech Republic	Zdeněk Mlynář	AC Sparta Praha
2005–2009	No race		
2010	Belgium	Sven Nys	Landbouwkrediet
2011	Belgium	Kevin Pauwels	Telenet–Fidea
2012	Belgium	Niels Albert	BKCP–Powerplus
2013	Belgium	Sven Nys	Crelan–Euphony
2014	Belgium	Sven Nys	Crelan–AA Drink Team
2015	Belgium	Wout Van Aert	Vastgoedservice–Golden Palace
2016	Belgium	Wout Van Aert	Crelan–Vastgoedservice
2017	Netherlands	Lars van der Haar	Telenet–Fidea Lions
2018	Netherlands	Mathieu van der Poel	Corendon–Circus
2019	Belgium	Toon Aerts	Telenet–Fidea Lions

=== Women ===
Year	Country	Rider	Team
2013	Great Britain	Nikki Harris	
2014	Netherlands	Sophie de Boer	
2015	Czech Republic	Pavla Havlíková	
2016	Netherlands	Thalita de Jong	
2017	United States	Katie Compton	
2018	Netherlands	Marianne Vos	WaowDeals Pro Cycling
2019	Netherlands	Ceylin del Carmen Alvarado	Corendon–Circus
