= Roprachtice =

- Municipality
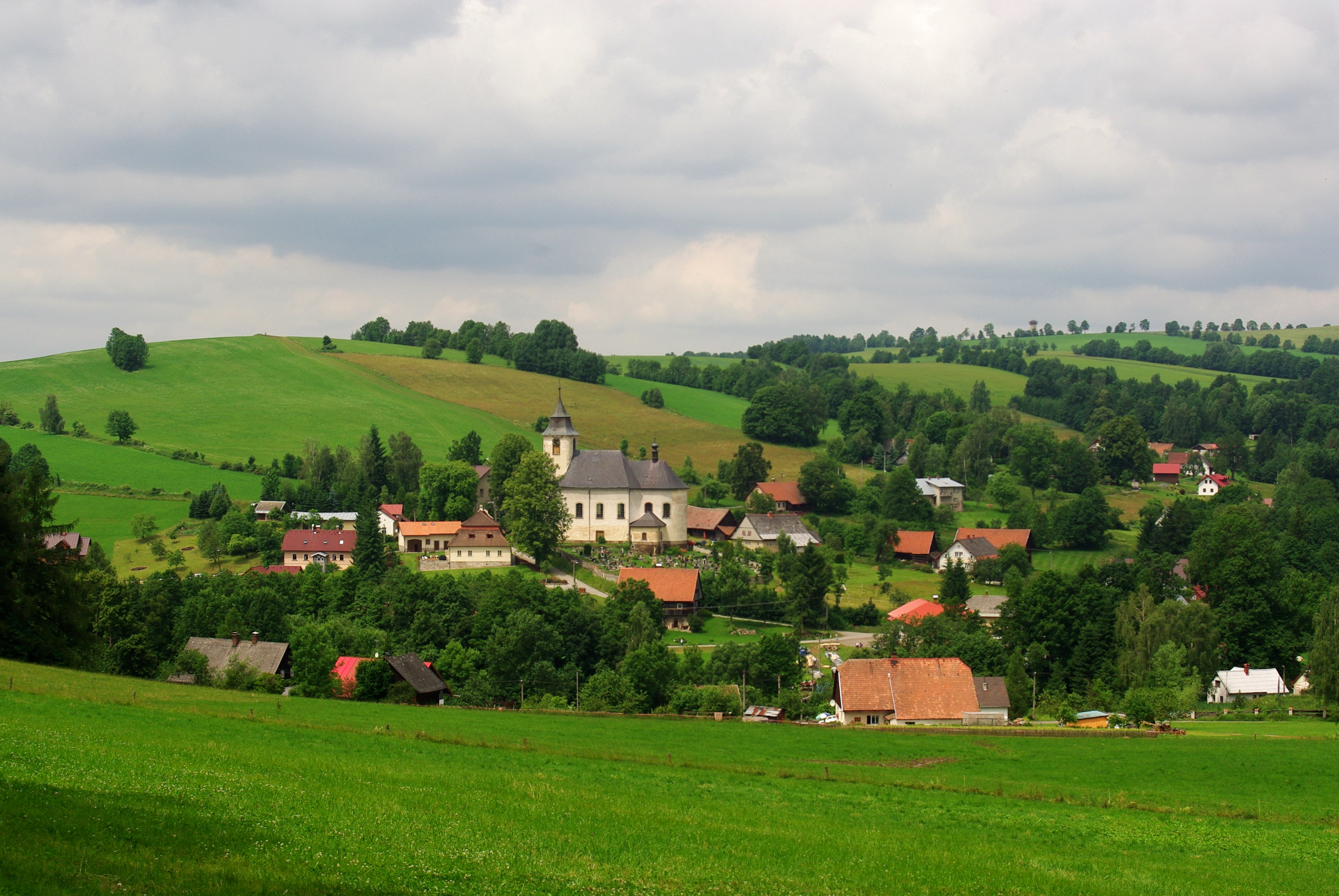
- General view

- Flag Coat of arms

- Location in the Czech Republic
- Coordinates: 50°38′52″N 15°24′57″E
- Country: Czech Republic
- Region: Liberec
- District: Semily
- First mentioned: 1352

Area
  - Total: 11.61 km^{2} (4.48 sq mi)
- Elevation: 578 m (1,896 ft)

Population (2026-01-01)
  - Total: 293
  - Density: 25.2/km^{2} (65.4/sq mi)
- Time zone: UTC+1 (CET)
  - Summer (DST): UTC+2 (CEST)
- Postal code: 513 01
- Website: www.obecroprachtice.cz

Roprachtice is a municipality and village in Semily District in the Liberec Region of the Czech Republic. It has about 300 inhabitants.

== Etymology ==
In the oldest documents, the name of the village is written as Ruprechtice and Roprechtice. The name is derived from the personal name Ruprecht/Roprecht, meaning "the village of Ruprecht's/Roprecht's people".

== Geography ==
Roprachtice is located about 7 kilometres (4 mi) northeast of Semily and 27 km (17 mi) southeast of Liberec. It lies in the Giant Mountains Foothills. The highest point is the hill Chlum with an altitude of 695 m (2,280 ft). The stream Hrádecký potok originates here and flows across the municipality.

== History ==
Roprachtice was probably founded in the 13th century. The first written mention of the village is from 1352. The oldest known owners of the village were the Waldstein family. Important owners of Roprachtice also included the Caretto-Millesimo family and the Rohan family, who owned it in the 18th and 19th centuries.

== Demographics ==
Historical population

Year	Pop.	±%
1869	1,494	—
1880	1,399	−6.4%
1890	1,378	−1.5%
1900	1,238	−10.2%
1910	1,164	−6.0%

Year	Pop.	±%
1921	1,082	−7.0%
1930	959	−11.4%
1950	602	−37.2%
1961	502	−16.6%
1970	412	−17.9%

Year	Pop.	±%
1980	312	−24.3%
1991	308	−1.3%
2001	268	−13.0%
2011	275	+2.6%
2021	269	−2.2%

Source: Censuses

== Transport ==
There are no railways or major roads passing through the municipality.

== Sights ==
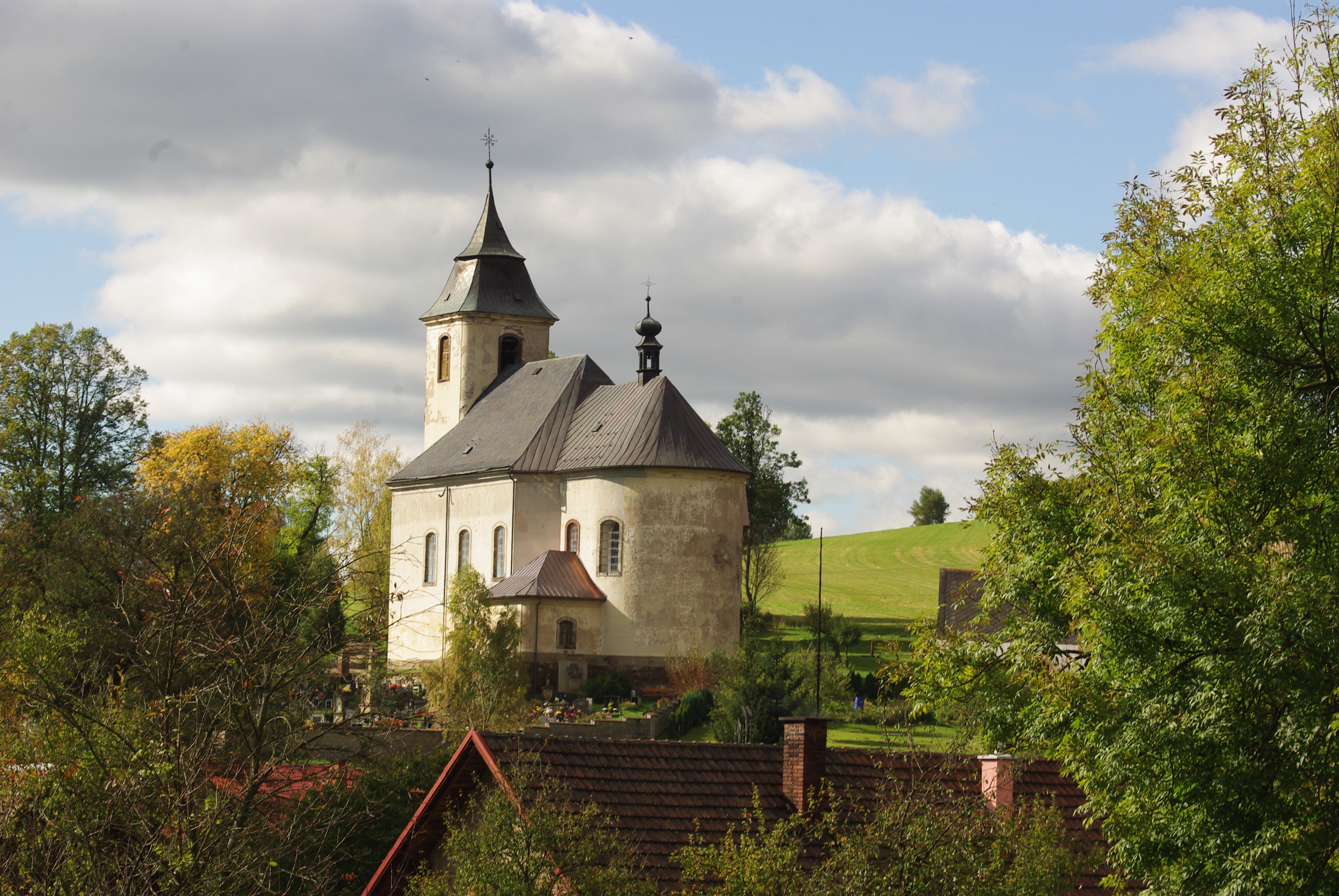
Church of the Holy Trinity

The main landmark of Roprachtice is the Church of the Holy Trinity from 1766. A valuable building is also the rectory, which dates from 1793.

U borovice is a privately owned observation tower. It is a 18 m (59 ft) high brick and stone tower with a wooden gallery. Next to the tower is a museum of typewriters.

== In popular culture ==
The movies Forgotten Light and Krakonoš a lyžníci were filmed mainly in Roprachtice.
