= Petr Dlask =

Czech cyclo-cross cyclist

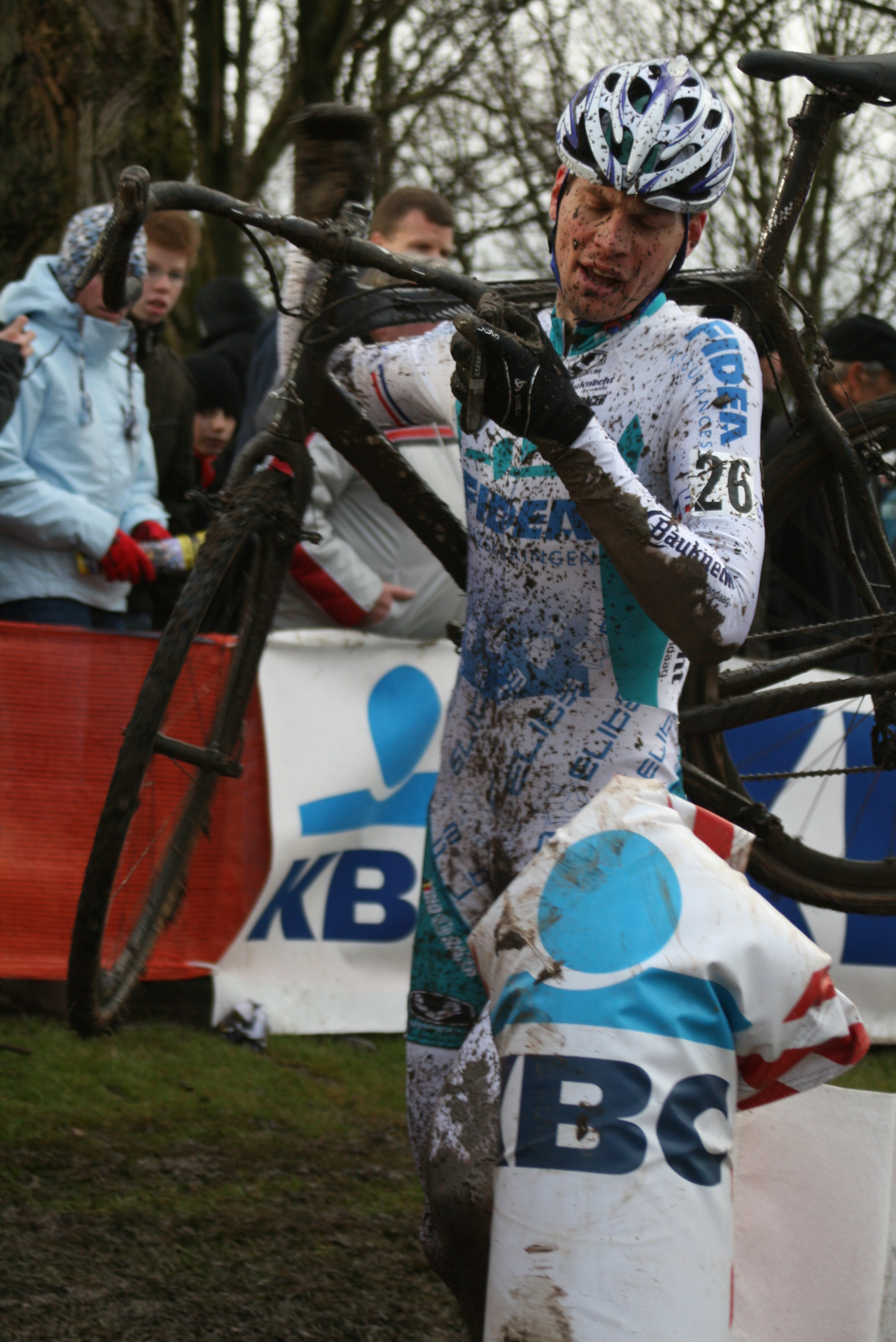

Personal information
- Full name: Petr Dlask
- Born: 20 October 1976 (age 49)

Cycling career
- Sport: Cycling
- Current team: Retired
- Disciplines: Cyclo-cross; Road
- Role: Rider

Professional teams
- 1998–2004: Author
- 2005: Empella Czech Team
- 2006–2011: Fidea
Medal record
Representing Czech Republic
World Championships
Silver medal – second place	2001 Tábor	Elite race
Bronze medal – third place	1998 Middelfart	Under-23 race

Petr Dlask (born 20 October 1976) is a Czech former cyclo-cross and road cyclist.

== Major results ==
1997–1998
3rd UCI Under-23 World Championships
1998-1999
3rd Ziklokross Igorre
1999–2000
1st National Championships
2000–2001
1st National Championships
2nd UCI World Championships
UCI World Cup

2nd Heusden-Zolder
2nd Zeddam
3rd Pontchâteau
3rd Leudelange

2002–2003
1st National Championships
1st Overall Budvar Cup
2003–2004
Budvar Cup

1st Hlinsko

2004–2005
Budvar Cup

2nd Mladá Boleslav
2nd Plzen

2005–2006
1st National Championships
1st Overall Budvar Cup

1st Loštice
1st Mladá Boleslav
1st Hlinsko
1st Plzen

UCI World Cup

2nd Tábor
2nd Igorre
3rd Kalmthout

3rd Azencross
2006–2007
1st National Championships
UCI World Cup

2nd Hofstade
2nd Hoogerheide

3rd Veghel-Eerde
2007–2008
Toi Toi Cup

2nd Uničov

2008–2009
Toi Toi Cup

1st Hlinsko
2nd Holé Vrchy
2nd Uničov
3rd Louny

1st Velka cena skupiny CEZ
3rd Grand Prix Olomouc
2009–2010
2nd National Championships
Toi Toi Cup

3rd Hlinsko
3rd Podbořany
3rd Stříbro

2010–2011
Toi Toi Cup

3rd Louny

2011–2012
Toi Toi Cup

1st Loštice
2nd Mnichovo Hradiště
2nd Kolín
3rd Stříbro

1st Grand Prix Julien Cajot
2nd Podbrezova
2012–2013
1st Grand Prix Möbel Alvisse
Toi Toi Cup

3rd Hlinsko
