= Emil Hekele =

Czech cyclo-cross cyclist

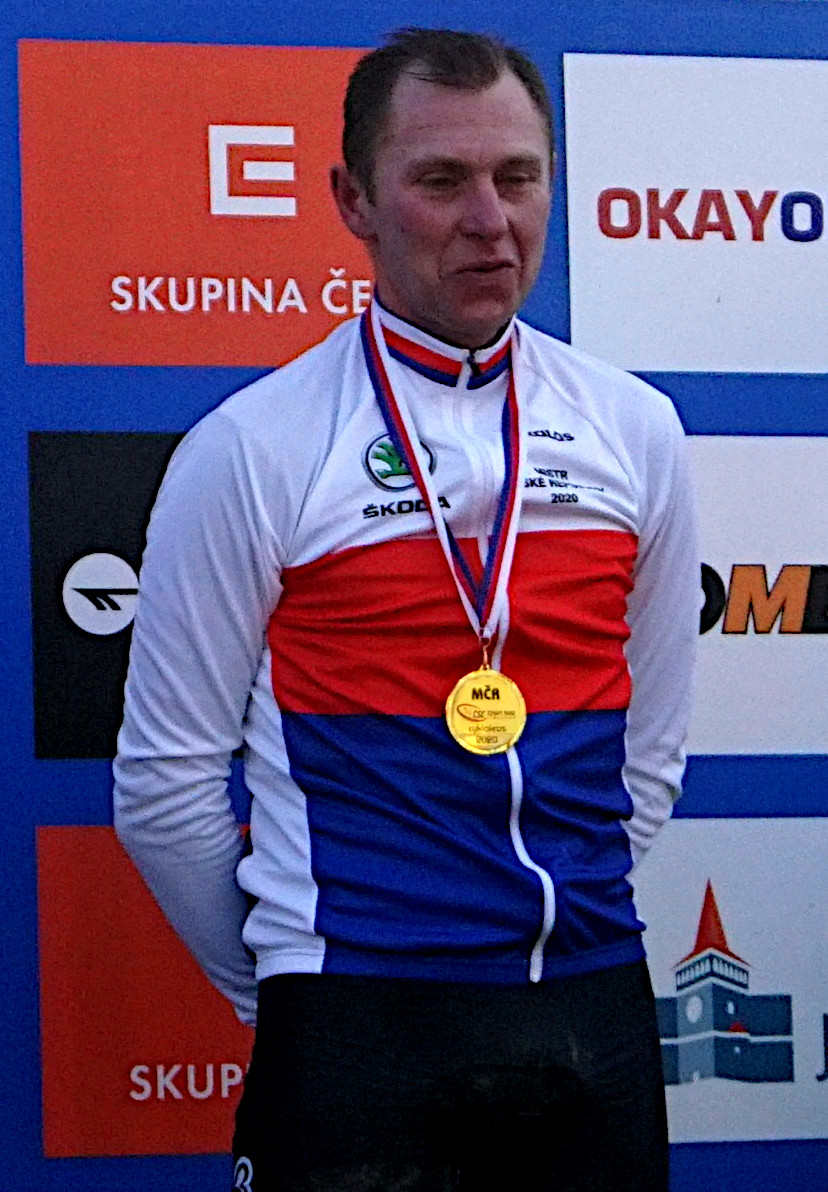
- Hekele at the 2020 National Cyclo-cross Championships

Personal information
- Born: 31 March 1977 (age 49) Zábřeh, Czech Republic

Cycling career
- Sport: Cycling
- Disciplines: Cyclo-cross; Road
- Role: Rider

Professional teams
- 2004: AC Sparta Praha
- 2005: Dukla Trenčín

Emil Hekele (born 31 March 1977) is a Czech cyclo-cross cyclist.

== Major results ==
2006–2007
2nd Grand Prix Axa
2017–2018
1st Rapha Supercross Nobeyama Day 1
2018–2019
1st Grand Prix Rakova
2nd Grand Prix Garage Collé
2nd Grand Prix Möbel Alvisse
2nd Kansai Cyclo Cross Makino Round
2nd Rapha Supercross Nobeyama
2019–2020
1st National Championships
1st November Cross
1st Kansai Cyclo Cross Makino Round
1st Utsunomiya Cyclo Cross Day 1 & 2
1st Rapha Supercross Nobeyama
1st Tage des Querfeldeinsports
2nd Grand Prix Rakova

== Doping violation ==
On 6 January 2021, The Disciplinary Commission of the Czech Cycling Association imposed a four-year ban on cyclocrosser Emil Hekele. The doping control performed out of competition on 9 September 2020 on Emil Hekele was a positive finding with the banned substances oxandrolone and clenbuterol (anabolic androgenic steroids).
