= Tomáš Paprstka =

Personal information
- Born: 1 March 1992 (age 34) Vsetín, Czech Republic

Cycling career
- Sport: Cycling
- Disciplines: Cyclo-cross, mountain
- Role: Rider

Tomáš Paprstka (born 1 March 1992) is a Czech professional cyclo-cross cyclist.

== Major results ==
=== Cyclo-cross ===
2009–2010
1st UCI World Junior Championships
3rd National Junior Championships
2012–2013
Toi Toi Cup

1st Louny

1st Stadl-Paura
2013–2014
Toi Toi Cup

1st Milovice
1st Kolín

2014–2015
3rd Overall Toi Toi Cup
2015–2016
1st Overall Toi Toi Cup

1st Hlinsko
1st Milovice
1st Holé Vrchy

1st Podbrezová
2016–2017
1st Overall Toi Toi Cup

1st Mladá Boleslav
1st Holé Vrchy

2nd National Championships
2017–2918
1st Overall Toi Toi Cup

1st Jabkenice
1st Hlinsko
1st Holé Vrchy
3rd Uničov
3rd Kolín
3rd Milovice

1st Rakova
1st Podbrezová
2018–2019
1st Trnava
2nd National Championships
2nd Overall Toi Toi Cup

1st Jabkenice
3rd Hlinsko
3rd Jičín

2nd Ternitz
2019–2020
2nd Poprad
2nd Trnava
3rd Overall Toi Toi Cup

2nd Holé Vrchy
2nd Hlinsko

3rd Kosice
3rd Rakova
2020–2021
2nd National Championships
2021–2022
3rd Overall Toi Toi Cup

3rd Slaný
3rd Hlinsko
3rd Veselí nad Lužnicí
3rd Jičín

=== Mountain bike ===
2010
3rd Mixed relay, World Mountain Bike Championships
3rd Mixed relay, European Mountain Bike Championships
2012
1st National Under-23 Cross-country Championships
