= HSF System Cup =

Race details
- Date: September–January
- Region: Czech Republic
- Discipline: Cyclo-cross

History
- First edition: 2001–02
- Editions: 25 (as of 2026)
- First winner: Jiří Pospíšil (CZE)
- Most wins: Tomáš Paprstka (CZE) (4 wins)
- Most recent: Václav Ježek (CZE)

The HSF System Cup is a season-long cyclo-cross competition consisting of 8 races throughout the season in the Czech Republic. The event was formerly known as the Toi Toi Cup and Budvar Cup. The event It is one of five season-long competitions, alongside the UCI Cyclo-cross World Cup, Cyclo-cross Superprestige, the X²O Badkamers Trophy and the Exact Cross.

The competition is a point-based system where riders can win points in each of the races and the overall winner is based on the total points across all 8 races. The winner of each race is awarded 50 points and each subsequent rider, up to the 50th place, is awarded one point less.

== Winners ==
Year	Winner	Second	Third
2001–02	(Czech Republic) Jiří Pospíšil		
2002–03	(Czech Republic) Petr Dlask		
2003–04	(Czech Republic) Kamil Ausbuher		
2004–05	(Czech Republic) Zdeněk Mlynář		
2005–06	(Czech Republic) Petr Dlask		
2006–07	(Czech Republic) Zdeněk Mlynář		
2007–08	(Czech Republic) Zdeněk Mlynář		
2008–09	(Czech Republic) Martin Bína		
2009–10	(Germany) Johannes Sickmüller		
2010–11	(Czech Republic) Jaroslav Kulhavý		
2011–12	(Germany) Christoph Pfingsten		
2012–13	(Czech Republic) Martin Bína		
2013–14	(Czech Republic) Tomáš Paprstka	(Czech Republic) Michael Boroš	(Czech Republic) Vojtěch Nipl
2014–15	(Czech Republic) Jakub Skála	(Czech Republic) Michael Boroš	(Czech Republic) Tomáš Paprstka
2015–16	(Czech Republic) Tomáš Paprstka	(Czech Republic) Vojtěch Nipl	(Czech Republic) Lubomír Petruš
2016–17	(Czech Republic) Tomáš Paprstka	(Czech Republic) Jan Nesvadba	(Czech Republic) Michal Malík
2017–18	(Czech Republic) Tomáš Paprstka	(Czech Republic) Jan Nesvadba	(Poland) Marek Konwa
2018–19	(Czech Republic) Jan Nesvadba	(Czech Republic) Tomáš Paprstka	(Czech Republic) Jan Škarnitzl
2019–20	(Czech Republic) Michael Boroš	(Czech Republic) Jan Nesvadba	(Czech Republic) Tomáš Paprstka
2020–21	(Czech Republic) Michael Boroš	(Netherlands) Gosse van der Meer	(Czech Republic) Jakub Říman
2021–2022	(Czech Republic) Michael Boroš	(Poland) Marek Konwa	(Czech Republic) Tomáš Paprstka
2022–2023	(Czech Republic) Šimon Vaníček	(Czech Republic) Jakub Říman	(Czech Republic) Adam Ťoupalík
2023–2024	(Poland) Marek Konwa	(Czech Republic) Matyáš Fiala	(Czech Republic) Václav Ježek
2024–2025	(Poland) Marek Konwa	(Czech Republic) Václav Ježek	(Czech Republic) Maximilian Kerl
2025–2026	(Czech Republic) Václav Ježek	(Czech Republic) Michael Boroš	(Poland) Marek Konwa

== Women ==
Year	Winner	Second	Third
2016–2017	(Czech Republic) Martina Mikulášková	(Czech Republic) Vendula Kuntová	(Czech Republic) Denisa Švecová
2017–2018	(Czech Republic) Pavla Havlíková	(Austria) Nadja Heigl	(Czech Republic) Elizabeth Ungermanová
2018–2019	(Czech Republic) Pavla Havlíková	(Czech Republic) Nikola Bajgerová	(Czech Republic) Elizabeth Ungermanová
2019–2020	(Czech Republic) Tereza Vaníčková	(Czech Republic) Tereza Švihálková	(Czech Republic) Kateřina Mudříková
2020–2021	(Czech Republic) Karla Štěpánová	(Czech Republic) Tereza Vaníčková	(Czech Republic) Tereza Švihálková
2021–2022	(Czech Republic) Kristýna Zemanová	(Czech Republic) Pavla Havlíková	(Czech Republic) Karla Štěpánová
2022–2023	(Czech Republic) Kateřina Douděrová	(Czech Republic) Barbora Jeřábková	(Czech Republic) Kristýna Zemanová
2023–2024	(Czech Republic) Kateřina Douděrová	(Czech Republic) Amálie Gottwaldová	(Czech Republic) Anna Panušová
2024–2025	(Czech Republic) Kristýna Zemanová	(Czech Republic) Barbora Bukovská	(Czech Republic) Amálie Gottwaldová
2025–2026	(Czech Republic) Kristýna Zemanová	(Czech Republic) Barbora Bukovská	(Czech Republic) Kateřina Douděrová
