= Zdeněk Mlynář (cyclist) =

Czech cyclist (born 1976)

Personal information
- Born: 30 October 1976 (age 49) Valtice, Czechoslovakia

Cycling career
- Sport: Cycling
- Current team: Retired
- Disciplines: Cyclo-cross; Road
- Role: Rider

Professional team
- 2003–2007: AC Sparta Praha

Zdeněk Mlynář (born 30 October 1976) is a Czech former professional cyclo-cross cyclist. He won the UCI Junior Cyclo-cross World Championships in 1995 and the Wortegem-Petegem round of the 2004–2005 UCI Cyclo-cross World Cup. He retired in 2013.

== Major results ==
=== Cyclo-cross ===
1994–1995
1st UCI World Junior Championships
1995–1996
3rd UCI World Under-23 Championships
1996–1997
3rd National Championships
2003–2004
2nd Sankt Pölten
2004–2005
UCI World Cup

1st Wortegem-Petegem
3rd Milan

1st Overall Budvar Cup

1st Plzen
1st Uničov
2nd Podbořany
2nd Loštice
3rd Mladá Boleslav
3rd Hlinsko

2005–2006
Budvar Cup

1st Česká Lípa
2nd Podbořany
2nd Loštice
2nd Mladá Boleslav

2006–2007
1st Overall Budvar Cup

1st Uničov
1st Podbořany
1st Louny
1st Plzen
1st Kolín
2nd Mnichovo Hradiště

3rd Holé Vrchy
2007–2008
1st Overall Toi Toi Cup

1st Kolín
1st Hlinsko
1st Uničov
2nd Plzen
2nd Louny

3rd Fehraltorf
2008–2009
1st Podbrezova
2009–2010
Toi Toi Cup

2nd Mnichovo Hradiště
3rd Kolín

2nd Podbrezova
2011–2012
3rd Gościęcin
Toi Toi Cup

3rd Mnichovo Hradiště

2012–2013
2nd Udiča I
3rd Udiča II

=== Road ===
2002
1st Velká Bíteš–Brno–Velká Bíteš
2004
6th Rund um die Nürnberger Altstadt
2006
4th Colliers Classic
