= Steffen Weigold =

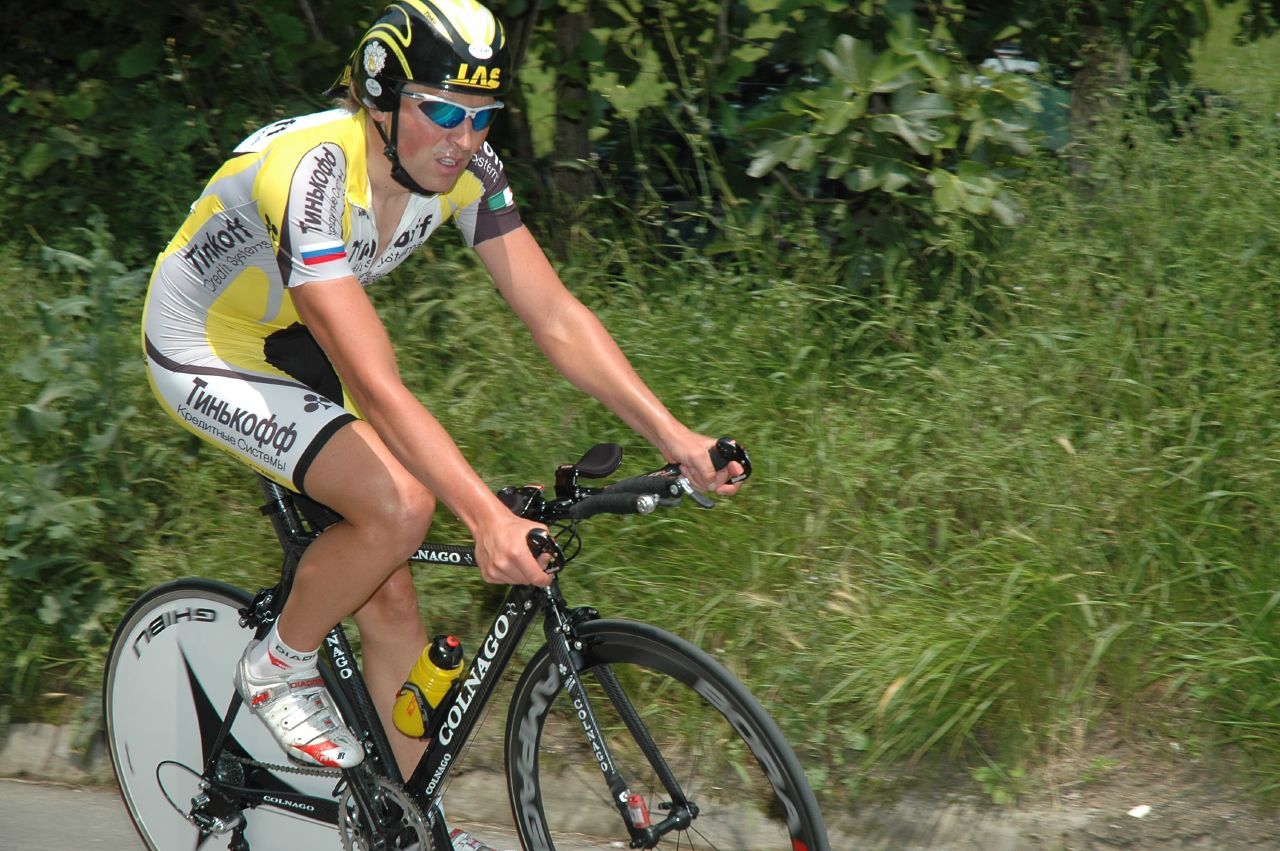

Personal information
- Born: 9 April 1979 (age 47) Oberndorf am Neckar, Germany

Cycling career
- Sport: Cycling
- Current team: Retired
- Discipline: Road
- Role: Rider

Professional teams
- 2001–2003: Gerolsteiner
- 2004–2006: Team Lamonta
- 2007: Tinkoff Credit Systems

Steffen Weigold (born 9 April 1979) is a German former cyclist. He rode in the 2003 Giro d'Italia, but did not finish.

== Major results ==
1999
1st Under-23 National Cyclo-cross Championships
2nd Rund um die Hainleite
2000
1st Under-23 National Cyclo-cross Championships
2001
3rd Overall Troféu Joaquim Agostinho
2006
5th Druivenkoers-Overijse
