= Martina Mikulášková =

Czech cyclist

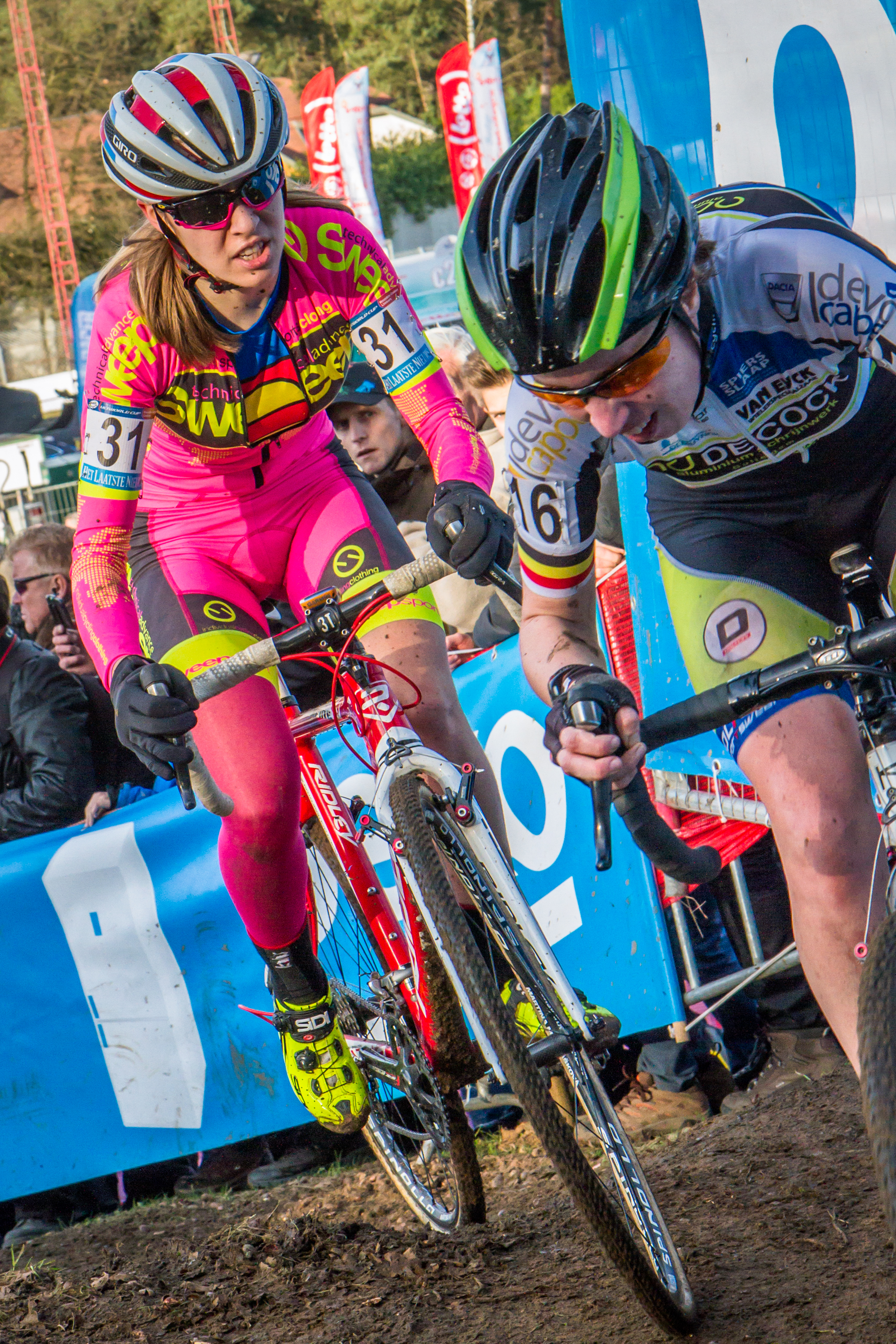
- Martina Mikulaskova (left) in the UCI Cyclocross World Cup, 2015

Personal information
- Born: 13 August 1993 (age 33)

Cycling career
- Sport: Cycling
- Current team: ČEZ Cyklo Team Tábor
- Discipline: Cyclo-cross
- Role: Rider

Martina Mikulášková (born 13 August 1993) is a Czech female cyclo-cross cyclist. She represented her nation in the women's elite event at the 2016 UCI Cyclo-cross World Championships in Heusden-Zolder.
