= Adam Ťoupalík =

Czech cyclist

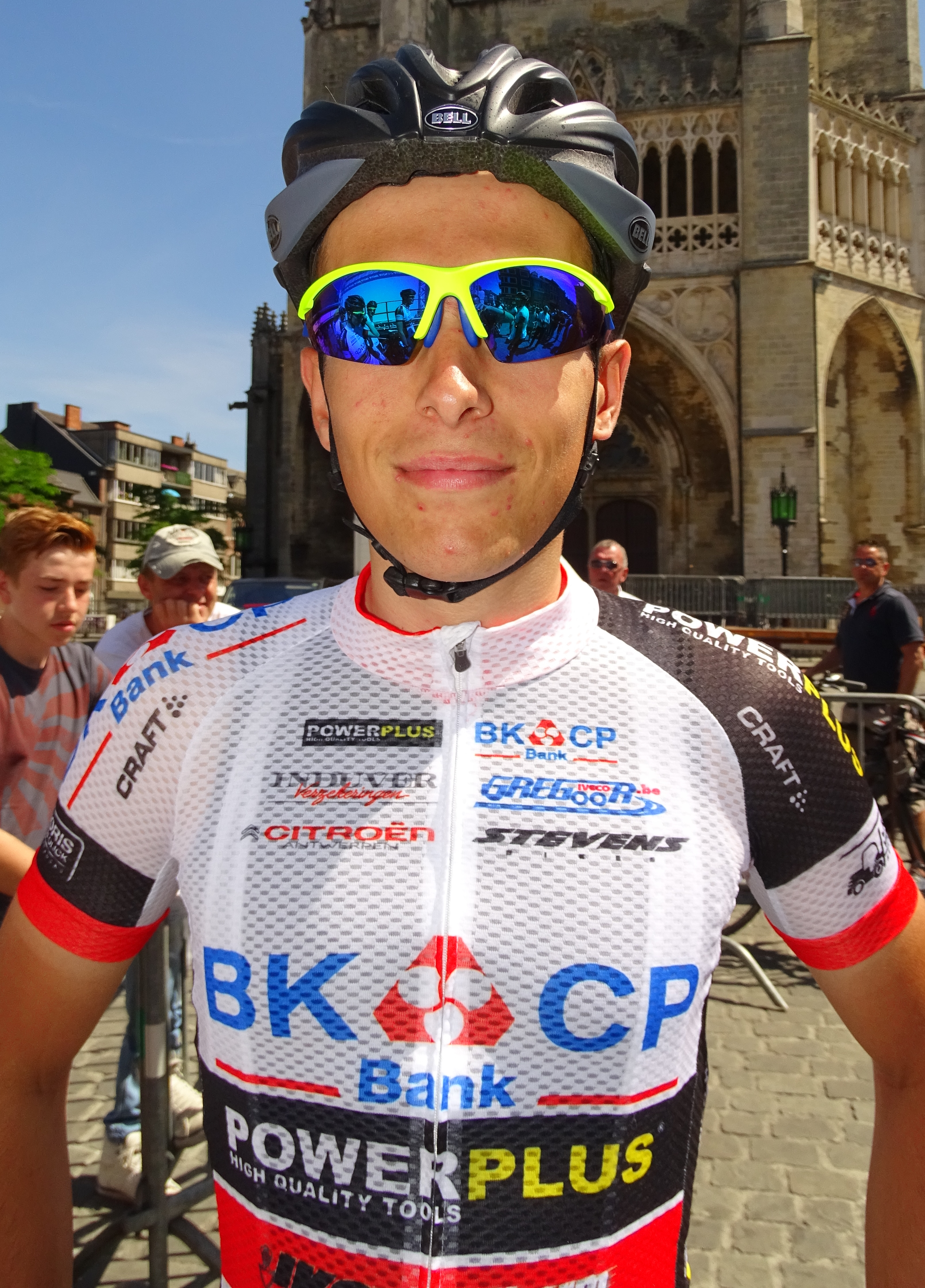
- Ťoupalík in 2015.

Personal information
- Full name: Adam Ťoupalík
- Born: 9 May 1996 (age 30) Tábor, Czech Republic

Cycling career
- Sport: Cycling
- Current team: Unibet Rose Rockets
- Disciplines: Cyclo-cross; Road
- Role: Rider

Amateur team
- 2018: Steylaerts–777

Professional teams
- 2015–2018: BKCP–Powerplus
- 2019: Steylaerts–777
- 2019: Team Sauerland NRW p/b SKS Germany
- 2020–2023: Elkov–Kasper
- 2024–: TDT–Unibet Cycling Team

Major wins
- One-day races and Classics National Road Race Championships (2020)

Adam Ťoupalík (born 9 May 1996) is a Czech cyclo-cross and road cyclist, who currently rides for UCI ProTeam Unibet Rose Rockets. He won the silver medal in the men's under-23 event at the 2016 UCI Cyclo-cross World Championships in Heusden-Zolder, being beaten in the sprint by Eli Iserbyt.

== Major results ==
=== Cyclo-cross ===
2012–2013
1st National Junior Championships
3rd UCI World Junior Championships
3rd Frankfurt Juniors
2013–2014
1st National Junior Championships
1st Overall UCI Junior World Cup

1st Tábor
1st Heusden-Zolder
1st Rome
2nd Namur
2nd Nommay

Junior BPost Bank Trophy

1st Wuustwezel

2nd UEC European Junior Championships
Junior Superprestige

3rd Gieten

2014–2015
1st National Championships
Toi Toi Cup

3rd Loštice
3rd Milovice

2015–2016
2nd UCI World Under-23 Championships
3rd National Championships
UCI Under-23 World Cup

3rd Heusden-Zolder

3rd Oostmalle Under-23
2016–2017
UCI Under-23 World Cup

3rd Heusden-Zolder

Under-23 DVV Trophy

3rd Essen
3rd Hamme

3rd Overijse Under-23
2017–2018
UCI Under-23 World Cup

2nd Koksijde

Under-23 Superprestige

2nd Gieten
2nd Boom

Under-23 DVV Trophy

2nd Antwerp
2nd Baal

2nd Oostmalle Under-23
Toi Toi Cup

2nd Jabkenice
2nd Slaný

2nd Rakova
3rd National Championships
4th UCI World Under-23 Championships
2020–2021
Toi Toi Cup

2nd Kolín

2021–2022
3rd National Championships
2022–2023
3rd Overall Toi Toi Cup

1st Veselí nad Lužnicí
2nd Hlinsko
2nd Jičín
3rd Holé Vrchy
3rd Kolín

2023–2024
Toi Toi Cup

1st Kolín

2nd National Championships

=== Road ===
2013
1st Mountains classification, Oberösterreich Juniorenrundfahrt
2014
National Junior Championships

1st Road race
1st Time trial

1st Mountains classification, Trofeo Karlsberg
8th Time trial, UEC European Junior Championships
2016
2nd Road race, National Under-23 Championships
7th Overall Tour Alsace
2018
1st Stage 3 Arctic Race of Norway
2nd Road race, National Under-23 Championships
4th Road race, National Championships
6th Road race, UEC European Under-23 Championships
6th Overall Boucles de la Mayenne
2019
7th Skive–Løbet
9th Himmerland Rundt
2020
National Championships

1st Road race
3rd Time trial

4th Overall Czech Cycling Tour
9th Road race, UEC European Championships
2021
1st GP Czech Republic
3rd Time trial, National Championships
3rd GP Adria Mobil
4th Visegrad 4 Kerekparverseny
5th Overall Istrian Spring Trophy
5th GP Slovenian Istria
5th GP Slovakia
6th GP Poland
8th Overall Alpes Isère Tour
9th Overall Circuit des Ardennes
9th Overall Sibiu Cycling Tour
2022
1st Visegrad 4 Bicycle Race
1st Visegrad 4 Kerekparverseny
2nd GP Slovakia
National Championships

3rd Road race
4th Time trial

6th Overall Okolo jižních Čech
2023
1st Trofej Umag
1st GP Goriška & Vipava Valley
2nd Overall Istrian Spring Trophy
2nd Trofej Poreč
7th Overall Circuit des Ardennes
10th Overall Czech Tour

1st Stage 4

2024
5th Time trial, National Championships
7th Overall Settimana Internazionale di Coppi e Bartali
