= Daniele Pontoni =

Italian cyclist

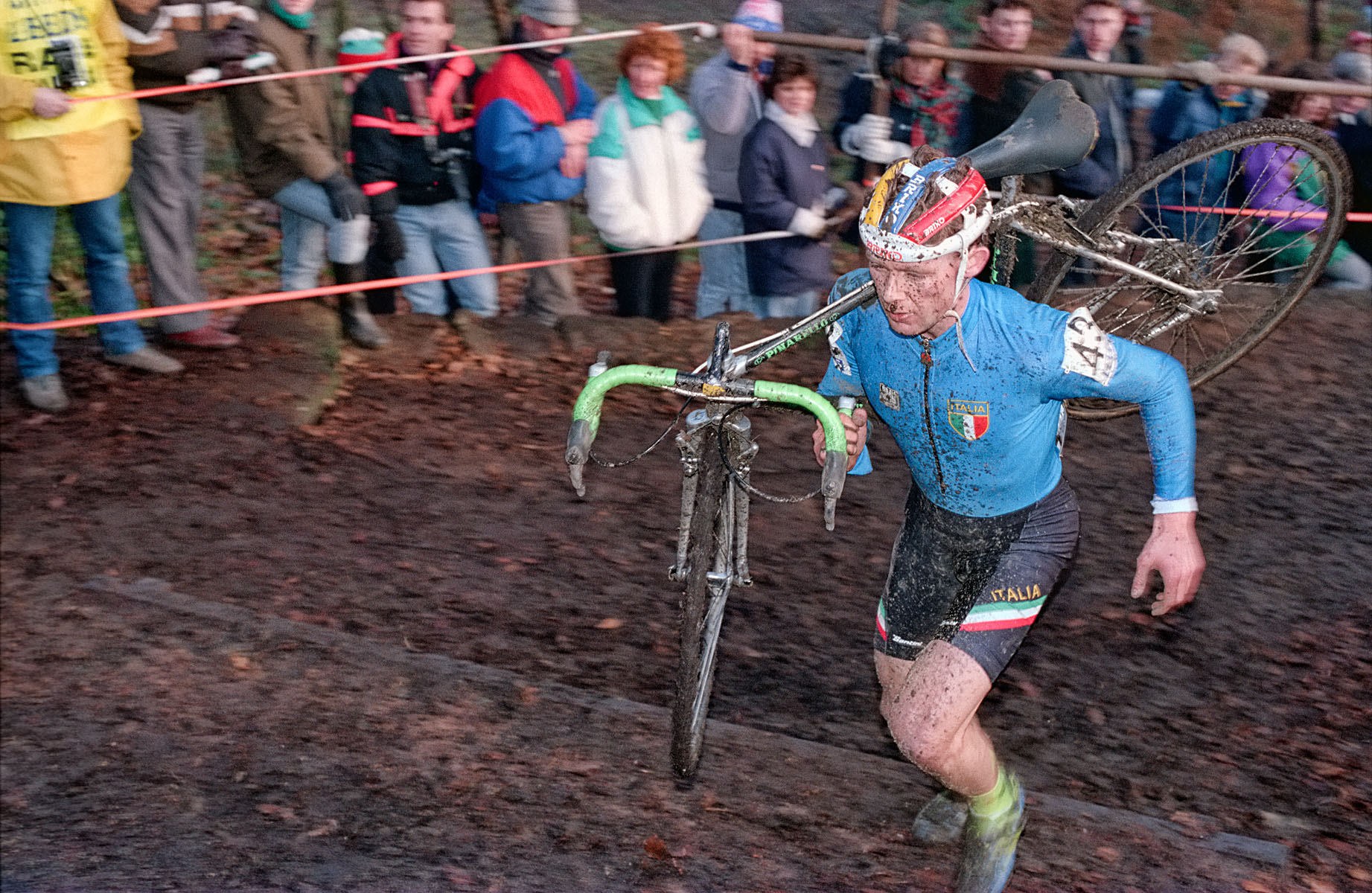
- Daniele Pontoni in 1992

Personal information
- Full name: Daniele Pontoni
- Born: 8 September 1966 (age 60) Udine, Italy

Cycling career
- Sport: Cycling
- Current team: Retired
- Discipline: Cyclo-cross
- Role: Rider

Major wins
- 1997 world cyclo-cross champion
Medal record
Men's cyclo-cross
Representing Italy
World Championships
Gold medal – first place	1997 Munich	Elite Men's Race
Silver medal – second place	1996 Montreuil	Elite Men's Race

Daniele Pontoni (born 8 September 1966 in Udine) is a former Italian professional cyclo-cross cyclist. Pontoni was World Champion of cyclo-cross by the amateurs in 1992 and by the elite in 1997. He was Italian cyclo-cross champion from 1996 to 2004. He also competed at the 1996 Summer Olympics.

== Palmarès ==
1991
Milano
Roma
1992
Igorre
Milano
Overijse
World Cyclo-cross Championship for Amateurs
Wetzikon
Zarautz
Zillebeke
1993
Harnes
Milano
Overijse
Westouter
Zarautz
Diegem
1994
Igorre
Italy national cyclo-cross championship
Meilen
1995
Igorre
Milano
Italy national cyclo-cross championship
Diegem
1996
Italy national cyclo-cross championship
Igorre
Diegem
1997
World Cyclo-cross Championship
Pétange
GP dell'Epifania
Italy national cyclo-cross championship
Solbiate Olona/Milano
Silvelle
1998
Milano
Pétange
Pontchâteau
GP dell'Epifania
Italy national cyclo-cross championship
Bolzano
Leudelange
Garfagnana
Kortezubi
Parabiago
1999
Pétange
Kayl
Solbiate Olona/Milano (ITA)
Italy national cyclo-cross championship
Pistoia
Boston supercup round 1
Milano
Bolzano
Garfagnana
2000
Pétange
GP dell'Epifania
Italy national cyclo-cross championship
Nommay
Milano
Igorre
2001
Italy national cyclo-cross championship
Lanarvily
Buttrio
Bolzano
2002
Ispaster
Milano
Italy national cyclo-cross championship
Lekeitio
Sassoferrato
Zegliacco
2003
Italy national cyclo-cross championship
Trebaseleghe
Valle Orco e Soana
Bolzano
Garfagnana
Lurago d'Erba
2004
Italy national cyclo-cross championship
Portland Saturn/Stumptown
Thousand Oaks
Seaford-New York
Faè di Oderzo
Soligo/Farra di Soligo
Morbegno
Garfagnana
Lurago d'Erba
Bassano del Grappa
2005
Triveneto Gara di Caonada
Vittorio Veneto
Fujimi
Yasugawa
Farra di Soligo
