= Pavla Havlíková =

Czech racing cyclist

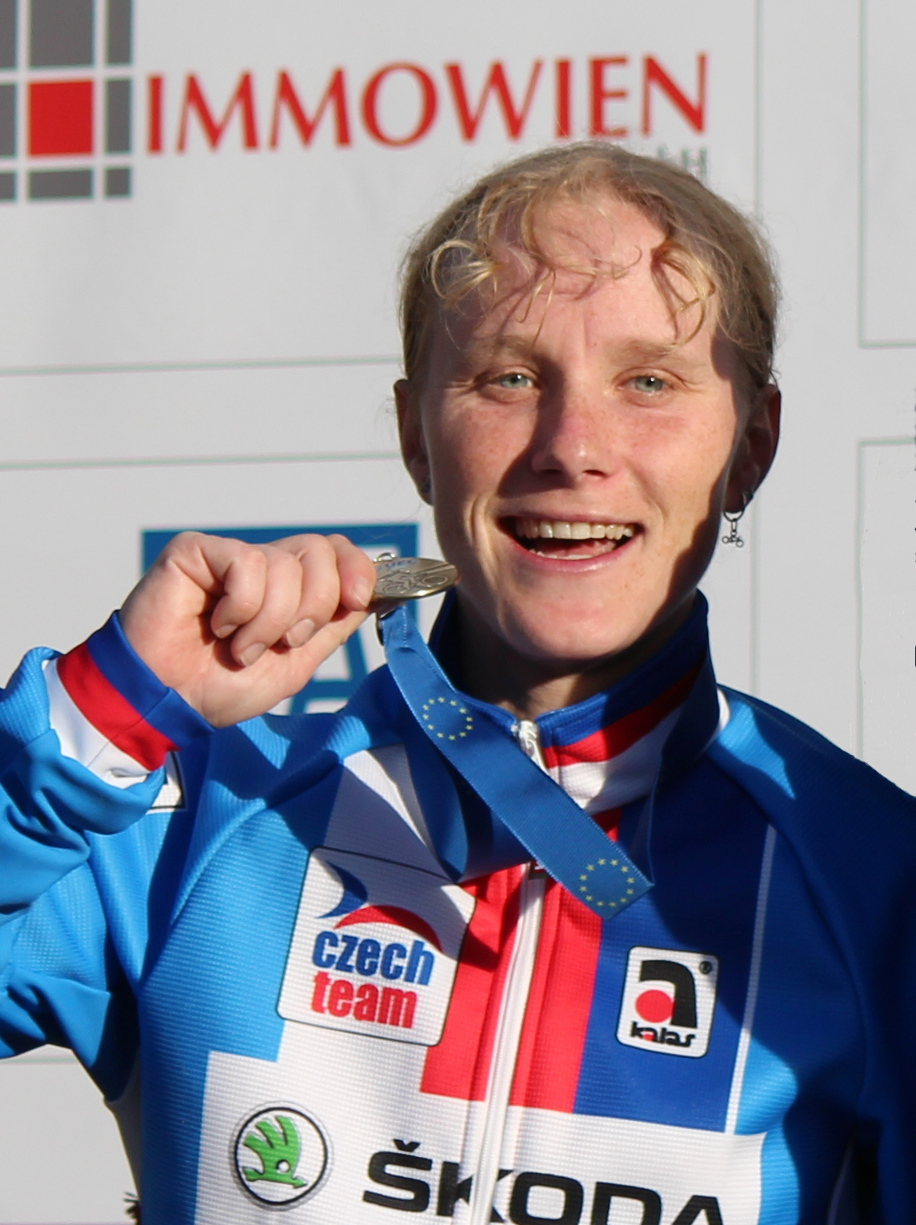
Pavla Havlíková

Pavla Havlíková (born 20 April 1983) is a Czech professional racing cyclist.

== Career highlights ==
1. 2004: 3rd in National Championship, Road, Elite, Czech Republic (F) (CZE)
2. 2006: 2nd in National Championship, Road, Elite, Czech Republic (F), Bratislava (CZE)
3. 2007: 3rd in National Championship, Road, Elite, Czech Republic (F), Brno (CZE)
4. 2007: 1st in Plzeň, Cyclo-cross (F) (CZE)
5. 2007: 1st in Gieten, Cyclo-cross (F) (NED)
6. 2007: 1st in Nommay, Cyclo-cross (F) (FRA)
7. 2008: 3rd in Surhuisterveen Centrumcross (F) (NED)
8. 2009/2010: 10th in UCI Cyclo-cross World Cup
