= UCI Cyclo-cross World Championships – Men's elite race =

International championships

- Rainbow jersey

Race details
- Date: End of January, beginning of February
- Discipline: Cyclo-cross
- Type: One-day
- Organiser: UCI

History
- First edition: 1950
- Editions: 76 (as of 2025)
- First winner: Jean Robic (FRA)
- Most wins: Mathieu van der Poel (NED) (8 wins)
- Most recent: Mathieu van der Poel (NED)

The first recognised UCI Cyclo-cross World Championships took place in Paris (France) in 1950 and was won by Jean Robic, of France. Between 1950 and 1966 the championship was open to both amateurs and professionals. From 1967 to 1993 two separate championships were organised – one for amateurs and one for professionals. From 1994 the championship became a single event again open to all elite riders. A junior world championship was introduced in 1976. All are organized by the Union Cycliste Internationale (UCI), and the winner has the right to wear the rainbow jersey for a full year, like the winners of the world championships in other cycling disciplines.

Unlike many UCI-sanctioned races, all the World Championships are organized by nationality, not by commercial teams. The race is usually held towards the end of the season; normally January. This list does not include the Men's Amateur World Championship medal winners.

== Palmarès ==
Year	Gold	Silver	Bronze
1950	Jean Robic (FRA)	Roger Rondeaux (FRA)	Pierre Jodet (FRA)
1951	Roger Rondeaux (FRA)	André Dufraisse (FRA)	Pierre Jodet (FRA)
1952	Roger Rondeaux (FRA)	André Dufraisse (FRA)	Albert Meier (SUI)
1953	Roger Rondeaux (FRA)	Gilbert Bauvin (FRA)	André Dufraisse (FRA)
1954	André Dufraisse (FRA)	Pierre Jodet (FRA)	Hans Bieri (SUI)
1955	André Dufraisse (FRA)	Hans Bieri (SUI)	Amerigo Severini (ITA)
1956	André Dufraisse (FRA)	Georges Meunier (FRA)	Emanuel Plattner (SUI)
1957	André Dufraisse (FRA)	Firmin van Kerrebroek (BEL)	Georges Meunier (FRA)
1958	André Dufraisse (FRA)	Amerigo Severini (ITA)	Rolf Wolfshohl (GER)
1959	Renato Longo (ITA)	Rolf Wolfshohl (GER)	Amerigo Severini (ITA)
1960	Rolf Wolfshohl (GER)	Arnold Hungerbuhler (SUI)	Robert Aubry (FRA)
1961	Rolf Wolfshohl (GER)	Renato Longo (ITA)	André Dufraisse (FRA)
1962	Renato Longo (ITA)	Maurice Gandolfo (FRA)	André Dufraisse (FRA)
1963	Rolf Wolfshohl (GER)	Renato Longo (ITA)	André Dufraisse (FRA)
1964	Renato Longo (ITA)	Roger De Clercq (BEL)	Joseph Mahe (FRA)
1965	Renato Longo (ITA)	Rolf Wolfshohl (GER)	Amerigo Severini (ITA)
1966	Erik De Vlaeminck (BEL)	Hermann Gretener (SUI)	Rolf Wolfshohl (GER)
1967	Renato Longo (ITA)	Rolf Wolfshohl (GER)	Hermann Gretener (SUI)
1968	Erik De Vlaeminck (BEL)	Hermann Gretener (SUI)	Michel Pelchat (FRA)
1969	Erik De Vlaeminck (BEL)	Rolf Wolfshohl (GER)	Renato Longo (ITA)
1970	Erik De Vlaeminck (BEL)	Albert Van Damme (BEL)	Rolf Wolfshohl (GER)
1971	Erik De Vlaeminck (BEL)	Albert Van Damme (BEL)	René De Clercq (BEL)
1972	Erik De Vlaeminck (BEL)	Rolf Wolfshohl (GER)	Hermann Gretener (SUI)
1973	Erik De Vlaeminck (BEL)	André Wilhelm (FRA)	Rolf Wolfshohl (GER)
1974	Albert Van Damme (BEL)	Roger De Vlaeminck (BEL)	Peter Frischknecht (SUI)
1975	Roger De Vlaeminck (BEL)	Albert Zweifel (SUI)	Peter Frischknecht (SUI)
1976	Albert Zweifel (SUI)	Peter Frischknecht (SUI)	André Wilhelm (FRA)
1977	Albert Zweifel (SUI)	Peter Frischknecht (SUI)	Erik De Vlaeminck (BEL)
1978	Albert Zweifel (SUI)	Peter Frischknecht (SUI)	Klaus-Peter Thaler (GER)
1979	Albert Zweifel (SUI)	Gilles Blaser (SUI)	Robert Vermeire (BEL)
1980	Roland Liboton (BEL)	Klaus-Peter Thaler (GER)	Hennie Stamsnijder (NED)
1981	Hennie Stamsnijder (NED)	Roland Liboton (BEL)	Albert Zweifel (SUI)
1982	Roland Liboton (BEL)	Albert Zweifel (SUI)	Hennie Stamsnijder (NED)
1983	Roland Liboton (BEL)	Albert Zweifel (SUI)	Klaus-Peter Thaler (GER)
1984	Roland Liboton (BEL)	Hennie Stamsnijder (NED)	Albert Zweifel (SUI)
1985	Klaus-Peter Thaler (GER)	Adri van der Poel (NED)	Claude Michely (LUX)
1986	Albert Zweifel (SUI)	Pascal Richard (SUI)	Hennie Stamsnijder (NED)
1987	Klaus-Peter Thaler (GER)	Danny De Bie (BEL)	Christophe Lavainne (FRA)
1988	Pascal Richard (SUI)	Adri van der Poel (NED)	Beat Breu (SUI)
1989	Danny De Bie (BEL)	Adri van der Poel (NED)	Christophe Lavainne (FRA)
1990	Henk Baars (NED)	Adri van der Poel (NED)	Bruno Lebras (FRA)
1991	Radomír Šimůnek (CZE)	Adri van der Poel (NED)	Bruno Lebras (FRA)
1992	Mike Kluge (GER)	Karel Camrda (CZE)	Adri van der Poel (NED)
1993	Dominique Arnould (FRA)	Mike Kluge (GER)	Wim de Vos (NED)
1994	Paul Herygers (BEL)	Richard Groenendaal (NED)	Erwin Vervecken (BEL)
1995	Dieter Runkel (SUI)	Richard Groenendaal (NED)	Beat Wabel (SUI)
1996	Adri van der Poel (NED)	Daniele Pontoni (ITA)	Luca Bramati (ITA)
1997	Daniele Pontoni (ITA)	Thomas Frischknecht (SUI)	Luca Bramati (ITA)
1998	Mario De Clercq (BEL)	Erwin Vervecken (BEL)	Henrik Djernis (DEN)
1999	Mario De Clercq (BEL)	Erwin Vervecken (BEL)	Adri van der Poel (NED)
2000	Richard Groenendaal (NED)	Mario De Clercq (BEL)	Sven Nys (BEL)
2001	Erwin Vervecken (BEL)	Petr Dlask (CZE)	Mario De Clercq (BEL)
2002	Mario De Clercq (BEL)	Tom Vannoppen (BEL)	Sven Nys (BEL)
2003	Bart Wellens (BEL)	Mario De Clercq (BEL)	Erwin Vervecken (BEL)
2004	Bart Wellens (BEL)	Mario De Clercq (BEL)	Sven Vanthourenhout (BEL)
2005	Sven Nys (BEL)	Erwin Vervecken (BEL)	Sven Vanthourenhout (BEL)
2006	Erwin Vervecken (BEL)	Bart Wellens (BEL)	Francis Mourey (FRA)
2007	Erwin Vervecken (BEL)	Jonathan Page (USA)	Enrico Franzoi (ITA)
2008	Lars Boom (NED)	Zdeněk Štybar (CZE)	Sven Nys (BEL)
2009	Niels Albert (BEL)	Zdeněk Štybar (CZE)	Sven Nys (BEL)
2010	Zdeněk Štybar (CZE)	Klaas Vantornout (BEL)	Sven Nys (BEL)
2011	Zdeněk Štybar (CZE)	Sven Nys (BEL)	Kevin Pauwels (BEL)
2012	Niels Albert (BEL)	Rob Peeters (BEL)	Kevin Pauwels (BEL)
2013	Sven Nys (BEL)	Klaas Vantornout (BEL)	Lars van der Haar (NED)
2014	Zdeněk Štybar (CZE)	Sven Nys (BEL)	Kevin Pauwels (BEL)
2015	Mathieu van der Poel (NED)	Wout van Aert (BEL)	Lars van der Haar (NED)
2016	Wout van Aert (BEL)	Lars van der Haar (NED)	Kevin Pauwels (BEL)
2017	Wout van Aert (BEL)	Mathieu van der Poel (NED)	Kevin Pauwels (BEL)
2018	Wout van Aert (BEL)	Michael Vanthourenhout (BEL)	Mathieu van der Poel (NED)
2019	Mathieu van der Poel (NED)	Wout van Aert (BEL)	Toon Aerts (BEL)
2020	Mathieu van der Poel (NED)	Tom Pidcock (GBR)	Toon Aerts (BEL)
2021	Mathieu van der Poel (NED)	Wout van Aert (BEL)	Toon Aerts (BEL)
2022	Tom Pidcock (GBR)	Lars van der Haar (NED)	Eli Iserbyt (BEL)
2023	Mathieu van der Poel (NED)	Wout van Aert (BEL)	Eli Iserbyt (BEL)
2024	Mathieu van der Poel (NED)	Joris Nieuwenhuis (NED)	Michael Vanthourenhout (BEL)
2025	Mathieu van der Poel (NED)	Wout van Aert (BEL)	Thibau Nys (BEL)
2026	Mathieu van der Poel (NED)	Tibor del Grosso (NED)	Thibau Nys (BEL)

== Medalists by country ==
Rank	Nation	Gold	Silver	Bronze	Total
1	Belgium (BEL)	30	26	26	82
2	Netherlands (NED)	13	13	9	35
3	France (FRA)	10	8	16	34
4	Switzerland (SUI)	7	13	11	31
5	Germany (GER)	6	7	6	19
6	Italy (ITA)	6	4	7	17
7	Czech Republic (CZE)	4	4	0	8
8	Great Britain (GBR)	1	1	0	2
9	United States (USA)	0	1	0	1
10	Denmark (DEN)	0	0	1	1
10	Luxembourg (LUX)	0	0	1	1
Totals (11 entries)		77	77	77	231

== Multiple winners ==
Wins	Name and country	Years
8	Mathieu van der Poel (NED)	2015, 2019, 2020, 2021, 2023, 2024, 2025, 2026
7	Erik De Vlaeminck (BEL)	1966, 1968, 1969, 1970, 1971, 1972, 1973
5	André Dufraisse (FRA)	1954, 1955, 1956, 1957, 1958
5	Renato Longo (ITA)	1959, 1962, 1964, 1965, 1967
5	Albert Zweifel (SUI)	1976, 1977, 1978, 1979, 1986
4	Roland Liboton (BEL)	1980, 1982, 1983, 1984
3	Roger Rondeaux (FRA)	1951, 1952, 1953
3	Rolf Wolfshohl (GER)	1960, 1961, 1963
3	Mario De Clercq (BEL)	1998, 1999, 2002
3	Erwin Vervecken (BEL)	2001, 2006, 2007
3	Zdeněk Štybar (CZE)	2010, 2011, 2014
3	Wout van Aert (BEL)	2016, 2017, 2018
2	Klaus-Peter Thaler (GER)	1985, 1987
2	Bart Wellens (BEL)	2003, 2004
2	Niels Albert (BEL)	2009, 2012
2	Sven Nys (BEL)	2005, 2013
