= Belgium at the UCI Cyclo-cross World Championships =

- IOC code: BEL
- Medals Ranked 1st: Gold 50 Silver 40 Bronze 31 Total 121

UCI Cyclo-cross World Championships appearances (overview)
- Recent: 2008; 2009; 2010; 2011; 2012; 2013; 2014; 2015; 2016; 2017; 2018; 2019; 2020; 2021; 2022; 2023; 2024; 2025

Belgium at the UCI Cyclo-cross World Championships is an overview of the Belgian results at the UCI Cyclo-cross World Championships. The only times that cyclo-cross racers appear in proper national selections of one or multiple sportsmen are the yearly UCI Cyclo-cross World Championships. Because of this, all Belgian national cyclo-cross teams (either elite or younger teams) only compete as such during one day per year. Since 2017, Belgium's national manager of the men's elite selection is Sven Vanthourenhout.

As of 30 January 2022, Belgium obtained most gold medals in the men's elite race and the men's races for under-23. Belgium's most successful competitor in elite races was Eric De Vlaeminck, with 7 gold medals. The nation's first medal, a silver, was earned by Firmin Van Kerrebroeck in the men's elite race in 1957.

== List of medalists ==
This is a list of all Belgian medals (including elite, under-23 and junior races).

Medal	Championship	Name	Event
Silver	(Belgium) 1957 Edelare	Firmin Van Kerrebroeck (BEL)	Men's elite
Silver	(Belgium) 1964 Overboelare	Roger De Clercq (BEL)	Men's elite
Gold	(Spain) 1966 Beasain	Eric De Vlaeminck (BEL)	Men's elite
Gold	1968 Luxembourg	Eric De Vlaeminck (BEL)	Men's elite
Gold	(Germany) 1969 Magstadt	Eric De Vlaeminck (BEL)	Men's elite
Gold	(Belgium) 1970 Zolder	Eric De Vlaeminck (BEL)	Men's elite
Silver	(Belgium) 1970 Zolder	Albert Van Damme (BEL)	Men's elite
Gold	(Netherlands) 1971 Apeldoorn	Eric De Vlaeminck (BEL)	Men's elite
Silver	(Netherlands) 1971 Apeldoorn	Albert Van Damme (BEL)	Men's elite
Bronze	(Netherlands) 1971 Apeldoorn	René De Clercq (BEL)	Men's elite
Gold	(Czechoslovakia) 1972 Prague	Eric De Vlaeminck (BEL)	Men's elite
Gold	(United Kingdom) 1973 London	Eric De Vlaeminck (BEL)	Men's elite
Gold	(Spain) 1974 Vera de Bidasoa	Albert Van Damme (BEL)	Men's elite
Silver	(Spain) 1974 Vera de Bidasoa	Roger De Vlaeminck (BEL)	Men's elite
Gold	(Switzerland) 1975 Melchnau	Roger De Vlaeminck (BEL)	Men's elite
Bronze	(Germany) 1977 Hannover	Eric De Vlaeminck (BEL)	Men's elite
Bronze	(Italy) 1979 Saccolongo	Robert Vermeire (BEL)	Men's elite
Gold	(Switzerland) 1980 Wetzikon	Roland Liboton (BEL)	Men's elite
Silver	(Spain) 1981 Tolosa	Roland Liboton (BEL)	Men's elite
Gold	(France) 1982 Lanarvily	Roland Liboton (BEL)	Men's elite
Gold	(United Kingdom) 1983 Birmingham	Roland Liboton (BEL)	Men's elite
Gold	(Netherlands) 1984 Oss	Roland Liboton (BEL)	Men's elite
Silver	(Czechoslovakia) 1987 Mlada Boleslav	Danny De Bie (BEL)	Men's elite
Gold	(France) 1989 Pontchâteau	Danny De Bie (BEL)	Men's elite
Gold	(Belgium) 1994 Koksijde	Paul Herygers (BEL)	Men's elite
Bronze	(Belgium) 1994 Koksijde	Erwin Vervecken (BEL)	Men's elite
Gold	(Germany) 1997 Munich	Sven Nys (BEL)	Men's under-23
Silver	(Germany) 1997 Munich	Bart Wellens (BEL)	Men's under-23
Gold	(Denmark) 1998 Middelfart	Mario De Clercq (BEL)	Men's elite
Gold	(Denmark) 1998 Middelfart	Sven Nys (BEL)	Men's under-23
Silver	(Denmark) 1998 Middelfart	Erwin Vervecken (BEL)	Men's elite
Silver	(Denmark) 1998 Middelfart	Bart Wellens (BEL)	Men's under-23
Bronze	(Denmark) 1998 Middelfart	Davy Commeyne (BEL)	Juniors
Gold	(Slovakia) 1999 Poprad	Mario De Clercq (BEL)	Men's elite
Gold	(Slovakia) 1999 Poprad	Bart Wellens (BEL)	Men's under-23
Silver	(Slovakia) 1999 Poprad	Erwin Vervecken (BEL)	Men's elite
Silver	(Slovakia) 1999 Poprad	Tom Vannoppen (BEL)	Men's under-23
Silver	(Slovakia) 1999 Poprad	Sven Vanthourenhout (BEL)	Juniors
Gold	(Netherlands) 2000 Sint-Michielsgestel	Bart Wellens (BEL)	Men's under-23
Gold	(Netherlands) 2000 Sint-Michielsgestel	Bart Aernouts (BEL)	Juniors
Silver	(Netherlands) 2000 Sint-Michielsgestel	Mario De Clercq (BEL)	Men's elite
Silver	(Netherlands) 2000 Sint-Michielsgestel	Tom Vannoppen (BEL)	Men's under-23
Bronze	(Netherlands) 2000 Sint-Michielsgestel	Sven Nys (BEL)	Men's elite
Bronze	(Netherlands) 2000 Sint-Michielsgestel	Davy Commeyne (BEL)	Men's under-23
Gold	(Czech Republic) 2001 Tábor	Erwin Vervecken (BEL)	Men's elite
Gold	(Czech Republic) 2001 Tábor	Sven Vanthourenhout (BEL)	Men's under-23
Bronze	(Czech Republic) 2001 Tábor	Mario De Clercq (BEL)	Men's elite
Gold	(Belgium) 2002 Zolder	Mario De Clercq (BEL)	Men's elite
Gold	(Belgium) 2002 Zolder	Kevin Pauwels (BEL)	Juniors
Silver	(Belgium) 2002 Zolder	Tom Vannoppen (BEL)	Men's elite
Silver	(Belgium) 2002 Zolder	Davy Commeyne (BEL)	Men's under-23
Bronze	(Belgium) 2002 Zolder	Sven Nys (BEL)	Men's elite
Gold	(Italy) 2003 Monopoli	Bart Wellens (BEL)	Men's elite
Silver	(Italy) 2003 Monopoli	Mario De Clercq (BEL)	Men's elite
Silver	(Italy) 2003 Monopoli	Wesley Van Der Linden (BEL)	Men's under-23
Bronze	(Italy) 2003 Monopoli	Erwin Vervecken (BEL)	Men's elite
Gold	(France) 2004 Pontchâteau	Bart Wellens (BEL)	Men's elite
Gold	(France) 2004 Pontchâteau	Kevin Pauwels (BEL)	Men's under-23
Gold	(France) 2004 Ponchâteau	Niels Albert (BEL)	Juniors
Silver	(France) 2004 Pontchâteau	Mario De Clercq (BEL)	Men's elite
Bronze	(France) 2004 Pontchâteau	Sven Vanthourenhout (BEL)	Men's elite
Gold	(Germany) 2005 St. Wendel	Sven Nys (BEL)	Men's elite
Silver	(Germany) 2005 St. Wendel	Erwin Vervecken (BEL)	Men's elite
Bronze	(Germany) 2005 St. Wendel	Sven Vanthourenhout (BEL)	Men's elite
Gold	(Netherlands) 2006 Zeddam	Erwin Vervecken (BEL)	Men's elite
Silver	(Netherlands) 2006 Zeddam	Bart Wellens (BEL)	Men's elite
Bronze	(Netherlands) 2006 Zeddam	Niels Albert (BEL)	Men's under-23
Bronze	(Netherlands) 2006 Zeddam	Tom Meeusen (BEL)	Juniors
Gold	(Belgium) 2007 Hooglede-Gits	Erwin Vervecken (BEL)	Men's elite
Gold	(Belgium) 2007 Hooglede-Gits	Joeri Adams (BEL)	Juniors
Silver	(Belgium) 2007 Hooglede-Gits	Niels Albert (BEL)	Men's under-23
Gold	(Italy) 2008 Treviso	Niels Albert (BEL)	Men's under-23
Bronze	(Italy) 2008 Treviso	Sven Nys (BEL)	Men's elite
Gold	(Netherlands) 2009 Hoogerheide	Niels Albert (BEL)	Men's elite
Bronze	(Netherlands) 2009 Hoogerheide	Sven Nys (BEL)	Men's elite
Silver	(Czech Republic) 2010 Tábor	Klaas Vantornout (BEL)	Men's elite
Silver	(Czech Republic) 2010 Tábor	Tom Meeusen (BEL)	Men's under-23
Bronze	(Czech Republic) 2010 Tábor	Sven Nys (BEL)	Men's elite
Silver	(Germany) 2011 St. Wendel	Sven Nys (BEL)	Men's elite
Bronze	(Germany) 2011 St. Wendel	Kevin Pauwels (BEL)	Men's elite
Gold	(Belgium) 2012 Koksijde	Niels Albert (BEL)	Men's elite
Silver	(Belgium) 2012 Koksijde	Rob Peeters (BEL)	Men's elite
Silver	(Belgium) 2012 Koksijde	Wietse Bosmans (BEL)	Men's under-23
Silver	(Belgium) 2012 Koksijde	Wout Van Aert (BEL)	Juniors
Bronze	(Belgium) 2012 Koksijde	Kevin Pauwels (BEL)	Men's elite
Bronze	(Belgium) 2012 Koksijde	Sanne Cant (BEL)	Women's elite
Gold	(United States) 2013 Louisville	Sven Nys (BEL)	Men's elite
Silver	(United States) 2013 Louisville	Klaas Vantornout (BEL)	Men's elite
Silver	(United States) 2013 Louisville	Wietse Bosmans (BEL)	Men's under-23
Bronze	(United States) 2013 Louisville	Wout van Aert (BEL)	Men's under-23
Gold	(Netherlands) 2014 Hoogerheide	Thijs Aerts (BEL)	Juniors
Silver	(Netherlands) 2014 Hoogerheide	Yannick Peeters (BEL)	Juniors
Bronze	(Netherlands) 2014 Hoogerheide	Jelle Schuermans (BEL)	Juniors
Gold	(Netherlands) 2014 Hoogerheide	Wout van Aert (BEL)	Men's under-23
Silver	(Netherlands) 2014 Hoogerheide	Sven Nys (BEL)	Men's elite
Silver	(Netherlands) 2014 Hoogerheide	Michael Vanthourenhout (BEL)	Men's under-23
Bronze	(Netherlands) 2014 Hoogerheide	Kevin Pauwels (BEL)	Men's elite
Silver	(Czech Republic) 2015 Tabor	Wout Van Aert (BEL)	Men's elite
Gold	(Czech Republic) 2015 Tabor	Michael Vanthourenhout (BEL)	Men's under-23
Silver	(Czech Republic) 2015 Tabor	Laurens Sweeck (BEL)	Men's under-23
Silver	(Czech Republic) 2015 Tabor	Eli Iserbyt (BEL)	Men's junior
Silver	(Czech Republic) 2015 Tabor	Sanne Cant (BEL)	Women's elite
Gold	(Belgium) 2016 Heusden-Zolder	Wout Van Aert (BEL)	Men's elite
Bronze	(Belgium) 2016 Heusden-Zolder	Kevin Pauwels (BEL)	Men's elite
Gold	(Belgium) 2016 Heusden-Zolder	Eli Iserbyt (BEL)	Men's under-23
Bronze	(Belgium) 2016 Heusden-Zolder	Quinten Hermans (BEL)	Men's under-23
Bronze	(Belgium) 2016 Heusden-Zolder	Sanne Cant (BEL)	Women's elite
Gold	(Luxembourg) 2017 Bieles	Wout Van Aert (BEL)	Men's elite
Bronze	(Luxembourg) 2017 Bieles	Kevin Pauwels (BEL)	Men's elite
Gold	(Luxembourg) 2017 Bieles	Sanne Cant (BEL)	Women's elite
Gold	(Netherlands) 2018 Valkenburg	Wout Van Aert (BEL)	Men's elite
Silver	(Netherlands) 2018 Valkenburg	Michael Vanthourenhout (BEL)	Men's elite
Gold	(Netherlands) 2018 Valkenburg	Eli Iserbyt (BEL)	Men's under-23
Gold	(Netherlands) 2018 Valkenburg	Sanne Cant (BEL)	Women's elite
Gold	(Denmark) 2019 Bogense	Sanne Cant (BEL)	Women's elite
Silver	(Denmark) 2019 Bogense	Wout van Aert (BEL)	Men's elite
Silver	(Denmark) 2019 Bogense	Eli Iserbyt (BEL)	Men's under-23
Silver	(Denmark) 2019 Bogense	Witse Meeussen (BEL)	Juniors
Bronze	(Denmark) 2019 Bogense	Toon Aerts (BEL)	Men's elite
Bronze	(Denmark) 2019 Bogense	Ryan Cortjens (BEL)	Juniors
Gold	(Switzerland) 2020 Dübendorf	Thibau Nys (BEL)	Juniors
Silver	(Switzerland) 2020 Dübendorf	Lennert Belmans (BEL)	Juniors
Bronze	(Switzerland) 2020 Dübendorf	Toon Aerts (BEL)	Men's elite
Bronze	(Switzerland) 2020 Dübendorf	Emiel Verstrynge (BEL)	Juniors
Silver	(Belgium) 2021 Oostende	Wout van Aert (BEL)	Men's elite
Bronze	(Belgium) 2021 Oostende	Toon Aerts (BEL)	Men's elite
Bronze	(Belgium) 2021 Oostende	Timmo Kielich (BEL)	Men's under-23
Gold	(United States) 2022 Fayetteville	Joran Wyseure (BEL)	Men's under-23
Silver	(United States) 2022 Fayetteville	Emiel Verstrynge (BEL)	Men's under-23
Silver	(United States) 2022 Fayetteville	Aaron Dockx (BEL)	Juniors
Bronze	(United States) 2022 Fayetteville	Thibau Nys (BEL)	Men's under-23
Bronze	(United States) 2022 Fayetteville	Eli Iserbyt (BEL)	Men's elite

== Medals by discipline ==
Event	Gold	Silver	Bronze	Total	Rank
Men's elite race	30	21	20	70	1
Men's under-23 race	12	13	6	31	1
Men's junior race	5	5	3	13	2
Women's elite race	3	1	2	6	
Total	50	40	31	120	
