= 1960 UCI Cyclo-cross World Championships =

Cyclo-cross championship

- Venue: Tolosa, Spain
- Date: 21 February 1960
- Coordinates: 43°8′N 2°5′W
- Cyclists participating: 31
- Events: 1

The 1960 UCI Cyclo-cross World Championships were held in Tolosa, Spain on Sunday February 21, 1960. It was the 11th edition of the UCI Cyclo-cross World Championships.

About 50,000 spectators lined a course of just over three kilometers that had to be completed seven times, bringing the total distance this edition to 21.66 kilometers. The 31 participants came from eight countries, including Portugal, which sent a team for the first time.

After the French Jean Robic (1950), Roger Rondeaux (1951–1953), André Dufraisse (1954–1958) and the Italian Renato Longo (1959), the West German Rolf Wolfshohl became the fifth cyclo-cross world champion in his fourth participation. It was his third consecutive podium finish.

== Men's Elite ==
RANK	1960 UCI CYCLO-CROSS WORLD CHAMPIONSHIPS	TIME
Gold medal	Rolf Wolfshohl (BRD)	00:57:11
Silver medal	Arnold Hungerbühler (SUI)	+ 0:14
Bronze medal	Robert Aubry (FRA)	+ 1:00
4.	Antonio Barrutia (ESP)	+ 1:15
5.	Firmin Van Kerrebroeck (BEL)	+ 1:46
6.	Pierre Kumps (BEL)	+ 1:50
7.	Renato Longo (ITA)	+ 2:11
8.	Roger De Clercq (BEL)	+ 3:12
9.	Roland Boschetti (ITA)	+ 3:12
10.	José Luis Talamillo (ESP)	+ 4:21
