= 1976 UCI Cyclo-cross World Championships =

Cyclo-cross championship

- Program booklet

- Venue: Chazay-d'Azergues, France
- Date: 25 January 1976
- Coordinates: 45°52′01″N 4°43′01″E
- Cyclists participating: 29 (Elite); 45 (Amateurs)
- Events: 2

The 1976 UCI Cyclo-cross World Championships were held in Chazay-d'Azergues, France on Sunday 25 January 1976. It was the 27th edition of the UCI Cyclo-cross World Championships.

== Venue ==
The circuit was 2,825 m long and was completed seven times by the amateurs and eight times by the professionals. Due to the rain and snow of the previous days, the ground was very muddy, and the riders had to run long stretches through the mud, including a steep ramp. The race was watched by 10,000 to 15,000 spectators.

== Men's Amateurs race ==
As every year since 1973, the amateur race was dominated by Klaus-Peter Thaler and Robert Vermeire. Thaler had a lead of about 25 seconds over Vermeire at the first crossing of the finish line, with Franco Vagneur and Vojtěch Červínek between them. Vermeire subsequently overtook both of them. Around the midpoint of the race, Thaler encountered difficulties, according to differing accounts, either due to a flat tire or because he was given a bike that was too large during the wheel change. Vermeire closed the gap to within 10 seconds, but then exhausted himself and fell back again. In the battle for third place, Ekkehard Teichreber narrowly defeated Červínek; this was Teichreber's third bronze medal at the World Championships.

== Men's Elite race ==
Among the professionals, Belgium was no longer favored despite its dominance since 1968. Roger De Vlaeminck did not defend his title from the previous year, partly to prepare for the road season; the Belgian federation fined him. His brother Erik had not competed in the season at all due to personal problems, and Albert Van Damme had even announced his retirement because he had only been selected as a reserve rider. The Swiss rider Albert Zweifel was considered the biggest contender for the title among the 29 riders from 8 countries. In the early stages, André Wilhelm was particularly active and initiated a leading trio together with Zweifel and Peter Frischknecht. After the second crossing of the finish line, Zweifel attacked, steadily increased his lead, and became the first Swiss rider to win the world championship title. Later, Frischknecht was also able to drop Wilhelm, resulting in a Swiss one-two finish. Van Damme unexpectedly joined the race and was also included in the lineup, but only managed to finish in ninth place.

== Men's Elite results ==
RANK	NAME	TIME
Gold medal	Albert Zweifel (SUI)	1:07:30
Silver medal	Peter Frischknecht (SUI)	+ 1:30
Bronze medal	André Wilhelm (FRA)	+ 2:33
4.	Cyrille Guimard (FRA)	+ 3:11
5.	Marc De Block (BEL)	+ 3:50
6.	Eric Desruelle (BEL)	+ 4:06
7.	Hermann Gretener (SUI)	+ 4:30
8.	Gerrit Scheffer (NED)	+ 4:36
9.	Albert Van Damme (BEL)	+ 4:58
10.	Gertie Wildeboer (NED)	+ 5:39

== Men's Amateurs results ==
RANK	NAME	TIME
Gold medal	Klaus-Peter Thaler (GER)	1:07:01
Silver medal	Robert Vermeire (BEL)	+ 0:50
Bronze medal	Ekkehard Teichreber (GER)	+ 1:28
4.	Vojtěch Červínek (TCH)	+ 1:30
5.	Franco Vagneur (ITA)	+ 2:12
6.	Willi Lienhard (SUI)	+ 2:50
7.	Miloš Fišera (TCH)	+ 3:01
8.	Jean-Yves Plaisance (FRA)	+ 3:10
9.	Wil Brouwers (NED)	+ 3:12
10.	Hennie Stamsnijder (NED)	+ 3:48
