= 1975 UCI Cyclo-cross World Championships =

Cyclo-cross championship

- Venue: Melchnau, Switzerland
- Date: 26 January 1975
- Coordinates: 47°11′N 7°51′E
- Cyclists participating: 21 (Elite); 53 (Amateurs)
- Events: 2

The 1975 UCI Cyclo-cross World Championships were held in Melchnau, Switzerland on Sunday 26 January 1975. It was the 26th edition of the UCI Cyclo-cross World Championships.

Compared to previous years, the event was brought forward by a month and now took place at the end of January. This should allow riders to better combine careers in road cycling and cyclo-cross.

== Venue ==
The 2,920 m long course was north of the town. Berghofstrasse served as the start and finish straight, otherwise the area to the east of it was crossed. The amateurs, who started at 12:30 p.m., completed seven laps, the professionals eight two hours later.

== Men's Amateurs race ==
The weather was good on the day of the event, but heavy rain the day before had softened the ground and turned it into a muddy field. 53 amateurs competed in front of around 20,000 spectators. Klaus-Peter Thaler and Willi Lienhard led the race in the first two laps, then Robert Vermeire and Gerrit Scheffer caught up with them. In the middle of the race, Vermeire left his competitors behind, benefiting from his running qualities. As in the previous year, he won ahead of Thaler, Scheffer prevailed in the fight for bronze.

== Men's Elite race ==
There were 21 starters from 6 countries among the professionals. Rolf Wolfshohl made a comeback after his retirement in 1973 and seven-time former world champion Erik De Vlaeminck was also there again after an absence the previous year. His brother Roger De Vlaeminck attacked in the second lap. As it later became known, Erik was supposed to wait until his opponents had exhausted their strength and then catch up with Roger in order to win. However, Erik De Vlaeminck couldn't shake off Albert Zweifel, Peter Frischknecht and Albert Van Damme and later had to let the two Swiss go. Roger De Vlaeminck became the first driver to win the professional world championship after the amateur world championship (1968). Except for the German Rolf Wolfshohl, who afterwards ended his active career, all riders in the top-10 were Belgian or Swiss.

== Men's Elite results ==
RANK	1975 UCI CYCLO-CROSS WORLD CHAMPIONSHIPS	TIME
Gold medal	Roger De Vlaeminck (BEL)	01:09:53
Silver medal	Albert Zweifel (SUI)	+ 0:31
Bronze medal	Peter Frischknecht (SUI)	+ 1:26
4.	Erik De Vlaeminck (BEL)	+ 2:03
5.	Albert Van Damme (BEL)	+ 2:18
6.	Marc De Block (BEL)	+ 2:48
7.	Hermann Gretener (SUI)	+ 3:49
8.	Rolf Wolfshohl (BRD)	+ 4:22
9.	Michel Baele (BEL)	+ 6:14
10.	Richard Steiner (SUI)	+ 6:28

== Men's Amateurs results ==
RANK	1975 UCI CYCLO-CROSS WORLD CHAMPIONSHIPS	TIME
Gold medal	Robert Vermeire (BEL)	01:00:11
Silver medal	Klaus-Peter Thaler (BRD)	s.t.
Bronze medal	Gerrit Scheffer (NED)	s.t.
4.	Willy Lienhard (SUI)	+ 2:09
5.	André Geirland (BEL)	+ 2:20
6.	Czesław Polewiak (POL)	+ 2:28
7.	Gilbert Lahalle (FRA)	+ 2:33
8.	Franco Vagneur (ITA)	+ 2:41
9.	Eric Desruelle (BEL)	+ 2:43
10.	Ekkehard Teichreber (BRD)	+ 3:01
