= 1971 UCI Cyclo-cross World Championships =

Cyclo-cross championship

- Venue: Apeldoorn, Netherlands
- Date: 28 February 1971
- Coordinates: 52°13′N 5°58′E
- Cyclists participating: 27 (Elite); 54 (Amateurs)
- Events: 2

The 1971 UCI Cyclo-cross World Championships were held in Apeldoorn, on Sunday February 28, 1971. Organized for a first time in the Netherlands, it was the 22nd edition of the UCI Cyclo-cross World Championships.

== Venue ==
The race took place in the Orderbos forest with its sports park on the western edge of the city. While Swiss national coach Carlo Lafranchi had previously described the course as the easiest in a long time, defending champion Erik De Vlaeminck had a completely different opinion. Due to overnight frost, the ground was ultimately very hard and fast. The three-kilometer circuit included five foot sections and a number of climbs. Amateurs completed seven laps, while professionals completed eight.

While all countries fielded a four-man team in the amateur race, only six countries and 19 riders were represented in the professional race, a new low. Furthermore, two pre-race favorites, Rolf Wolfshohl and Roger De Vlaeminck, withdrew from the professional race due to injuries and other priorities, respectively. Both races saw victories by the defending champions.

== Men's Amateurs race ==
In the amateur race, Robert Vermeire and Dieter Uebing formed a leading duo from the third lap onward, although they never gained more than half a minute on the chasing pack. On the final lap, Vermeire attacked and managed to maintain a small lead over Uebing to the finish. Jacques Spetgens, after a mediocre start, steadily worked his way to the front and won the bronze medal, while local favorite Wildeboer finished fifth.

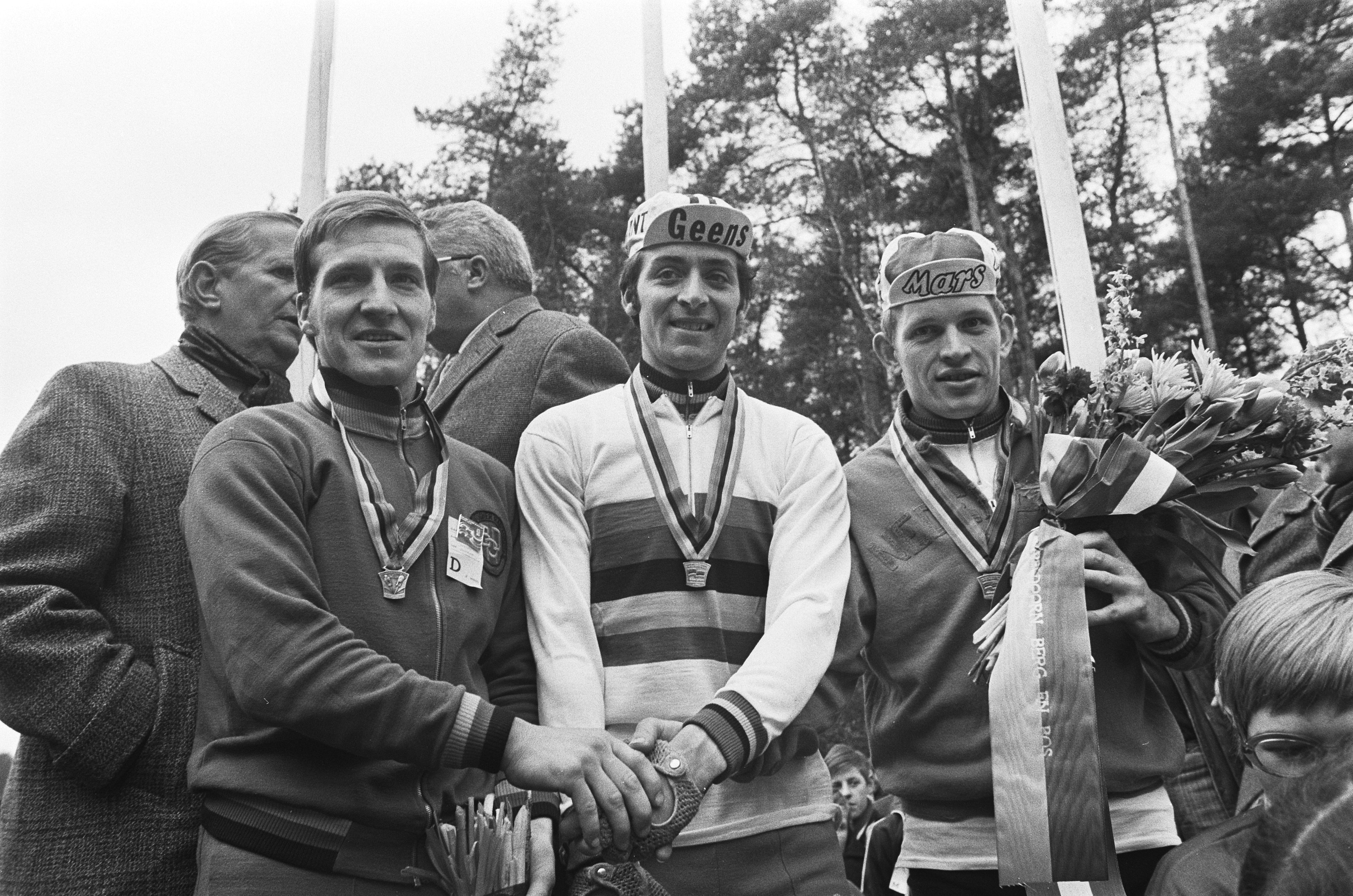
The Men's Amateurs podium, from left: Ubding, Vermeire and Spetgens

== Men's Elite race ==
The professional race was clearly dominated by the Belgian rivals Erik De Vlaeminck and Albert Van Damme, who broke away early. De Vlaeminck managed to escape midway through the race and won his fifth title. With another Belgian, René De Clercq, taking third place, all medals belonged to one nation for the first time since 1953. The Italian Luciano Luciani crashed in the chasing group and had to be taken away injured.

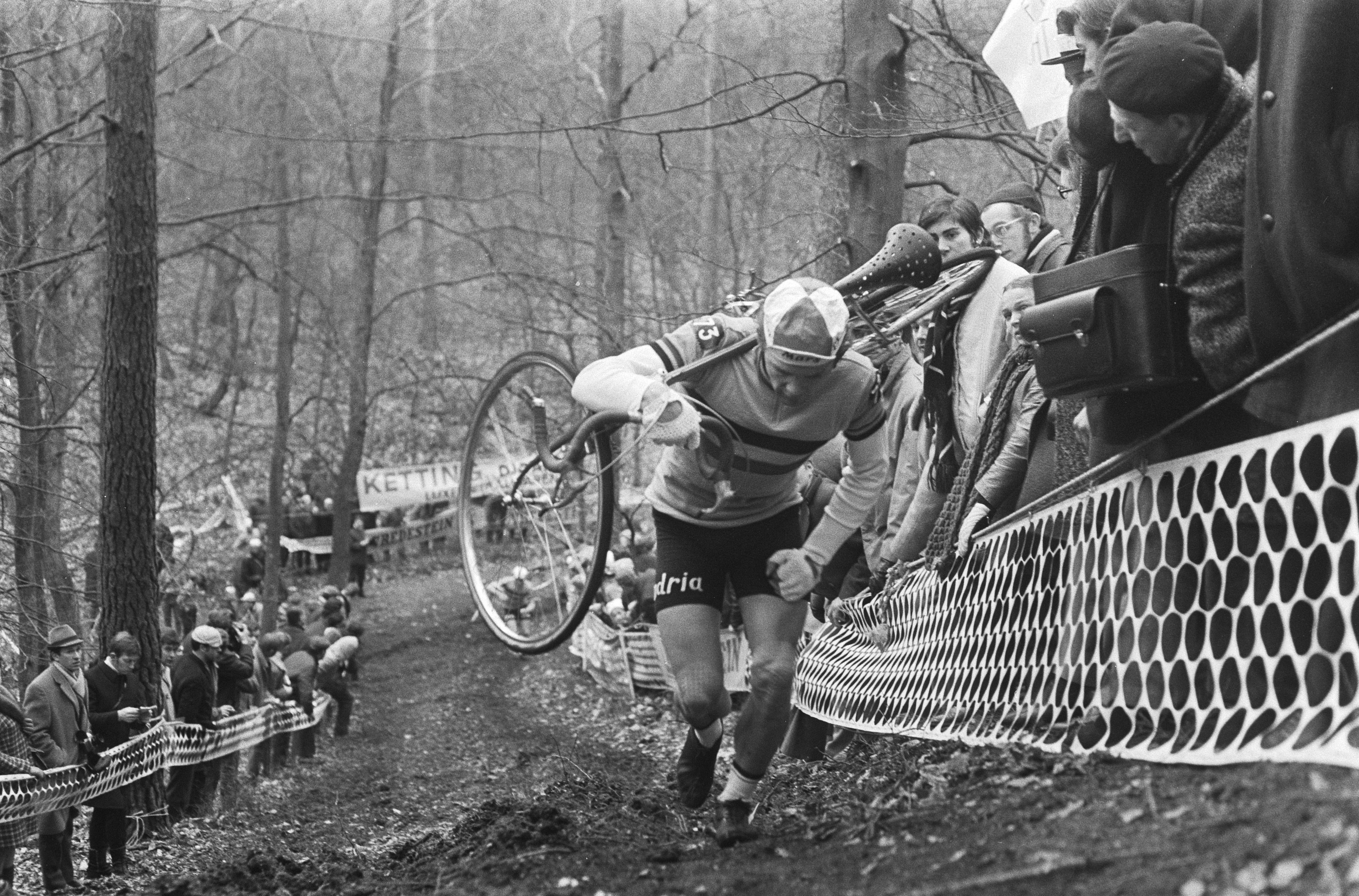
Eric de Vlaeminck during the Men's Elite race

== Men's Elite results ==
RANK	1971 UCI CYCLO-CROSS WORLD CHAMPIONSHIPS	TIME
Gold medal	Erik De Vlaeminck (BEL)	01:00:10
Silver medal	Albert Van Damme (BEL)	+ 0:10
Bronze medal	René De Clercq (BEL)	+ 2:40
4.	Peter Frischknecht (SUI)	+ 2:54
5.	Hermann Gretener (SUI)	+ 3:42
6.	Julien Vanden Haesevelde (BEL)	+ 3:45
7.	Renato Longo (ITA)	+ 3:55
8.	Charles Rigon (FRA)	+ 4:01
9.	Cees Zoontjens (NED)	+ 4:58
10.	John Atkins (GBR)	+ 5:27

== Men's Amateurs results ==
RANK	1971 UCI CYCLO-CROSS WORLD CHAMPIONSHIPS	TIME
Gold medal	Robert Vermeire (BEL)	00:54:35
Silver medal	Dieter Uebing (BRD)	+ 0:06
Bronze medal	Jacques Spetgens (NED)	+ 0:31
4.	Ekkehard Teichreber (BRD)	+ 0:37
5.	Gertie Wildeboer (NED)	+ 0:53
6.	Christopher Dodd (GBR)	+ 1:03
7.	Jakob Küster (SUI)	+ 1:10
8.	Jiří Murdych (CZE)	+ 1:21
9.	Albert Scheffer (NED)	+ 1:40
10.	Jean-Michel Richeux (FRA)	+ 1:47
