= 1977 UCI Cyclo-cross World Championships =

Cyclo-cross championship

- Venue: Hanover, West Germany
- Date: 30 January 1977
- Coordinates: 52°22′N 9°43′E
- Cyclists participating: 33 (Elite); 49 (Amateurs)
- Events: 2

The 1977 UCI Cyclo-cross World Championships were held in Hanover, West Germany on Sunday 30 January 1977. It was the 28th edition of the UCI Cyclo-cross World Championships.

== Venue ==
As in 1961, the start and finish were in the Niedersachsenstadion, in the vicinity of which a 2.6 km long circuit was built. This circuit was completed eight times by the amateurs and nine times by the professionals.

== Men's Amateurs race ==
[A few days before the event, 14 countries had registered; in addition to the traditional European cycling nations, the US and Canada participated. Poland joined at short notice. All 15 countries competed with a total of 49 riders in the amateur race, which started at 1 p.m.; however, the previous year's world champion, Klaus-Peter Thaler, had turned professional. Robert Vermeire attacked in the third lap and won his fifth title convincingly. Dieter Uebing held second place for a long time, but was caught and eventually overtaken by Vojtěch Červínek and Ekkehard Teichreber in the penultimate lap. Teichreber prevailed in the final sprint for the silver medal.

== Men's Elite race ==
With 33 riders from 9 countries, the professional field was the largest ever since the separation from the amateurs. Seven-time former world champion Erik De Vlaeminck returned after his absence the previous year, as did defending champion Albert Zweifel. Zweifel attacked in the first lap but was caught by De Vlaeminck and Peter Frischknecht in the third. In the fifth lap, Zweifel countered an attack by De Vlaeminck and gradually increased his lead. His closest pursuer was his fellow countryman Frischknecht, who, however, could not prevent Zweifel's repeated victory. The 1974 champion, Albert Van Damme, finished fifth in his final World Championship appearance; he had participated in every World Championship since 1961, also in Hanover. Last year's third-place finisher, André Wilhelm, suffering from health problems, abandoned the race. Approximately 10,000 spectators watched the race live.

== Men's Elite results ==
RANK	NAME	TIME
Gold medal	Albert Zweifel (SUI)	1:04:15
Silver medal	Peter Frischknecht (SUI)	+ 0:28
Bronze medal	Erik De Vlaeminck (BEL)	+ 1:11
4.	Willi Lienhard (SUI)	+ 2:05
5.	Albert Van Damme (BEL)	+ 2:17
6.	Marc De Block (BEL)	+ 2:35
7.	Gertie Wildeboer (NED)	+ 3:13
8.	Hermann Gretener (SUI)	+ 3:39
9.	Klaus-Peter Thaler (GER)	+ 3:45
10.	Richard Steiner (SUI)	+ 4:28

== Men's Amateurs results ==
RANK	NAME	TIME
Gold medal	Robert Vermeire (BEL)	56:12
Silver medal	Ekkehard Teichreber (GER)	+ 0:26
Bronze medal	Vojtěch Červínek (TCH)	same time
4.	Dieter Uebing (GER)	+ 0:32
5.	Miloš Fišera (TCH)	+ 0:46
6.	Jean-Yves Plaisance (FRA)	+ 0:58
7.	Alex Gérardin (FRA)	same time
8.	Heinz Weis (GER)	+ 1:05
9.	Franco Vagneur (ITA)	+ 1:15
10.	Jiří Kvapil (TCH)	same time
