= 1969 UCI Cyclo-cross World Championships =

Cyclo-cross championship

- Venue: Magstadt, West Germany
- Date: 23 February 1969
- Coordinates: 48°44′32″N 8°57′54″E
- Cyclists participating: 64
- Events: 2

The 1969 UCI Cyclo-cross World Championships were held in Magstadt, West Germany on Sunday February 23, 1969. It was the 20th edition of the UCI Cyclo-cross World Championships.

In front of 25,000 spectators, the amateurs started first. Defending champion Roger De Vlaeminck led the race alone for a long time until René De Clercq caught him in the sixth lap. 300 meters from the finish, De Vlaeminck crashed on a bend and had to concede victory to his compatriot. Belgian Robert Vermeire also secured third place on the podium. 44 of the 47 starters finished.

The race for the 24 professional riders saw a clear victory for defending champion Erik De Vlaeminck. Only Rolf Wolfshohl was able to keep pace with him for the first two laps before he too had to drop back. Five-time former world champion Renato Longo finished third. Four riders abandoned the race, and nine others were lapped.

== Men's Elite ==
| RANK | 1969 UCI CYCLO-CROSS WORLD CHAMPIONSHIPS | TIME |
|---|---|---|
| Gold medal | Erik De Vlaeminck (BEL) | 01:17:32 |
| Silver medal | Rolf Wolfshohl (BRD) | + 1:32 |
| Bronze medal | Renato Longo (ITA) | + 3:25 |
| 4. | Luciano Luciani (ITA) | + 5:27 |
| 5. | Freddy Nijs (BEL) | + 6:40 |
| 6. | Ernst Boller (SUI) | + 7:21 |
| 7. | Hermann Gretener (SUI) | + 7:49 |
| 8. | Huub Harings (NED) | + 7:56 |
| 9. | Julien Vanden Haesevelde (BEL) | s.t. |
| 10. | Giovanni Bettinelli (ITA) | + 8:17 |

== Men's Amateurs ==
| RANK | 1969 UCI CYCLO-CROSS WORLD CHAMPIONSHIPS | TIME |
|---|---|---|
| Gold medal | René De Clercq (BEL) | 01:09:36 |
| Silver medal | Roger De Vlaeminck (BEL) | + 0:32 |
| Bronze medal | Robert Vermeire (BEL) | + 0:56 |
| 4. | Jakob Küster (SUI) | + 1:30 |
| 5. | Franco Livian (ITA)} | + 2:05 |
| 6. | Peter Frischknecht (SUI) | + 2:26 |
| 7. | Břetislav Souček (CZE) | + 2:42 |
| 8. | Pierre Bernet (FRA) | + 3:09 |
| 9. | Flory Ongenae (BEL) | + 3:20 |
| 10. | Gertie Wildeboer (NED) | + 3:27 |
