= 1970 UCI Cyclo-cross World Championships =

Cyclo-cross championship

- Venue: Zolder, Belgium
- Date: 22 February 1970
- Coordinates: 51°03′N 05°17′E
- Cyclists participating: 23 (Elite); 41 (Amateurs)
- Events: 2

The 1970 UCI Cyclo-cross World Championships were held in Zolder, Belgium on Sunday February 22, 1970. It was the 21st edition of the UCI Cyclo-cross World Championships.

The hosts were considered the heavy favorites. Although doubts existed about the form of the defending champion in the professional category, Erik De Vlaeminck, who had not participated in the Belgian Championships due to a knee injury. His brother Roger De Vlaeminck, the 1968 amateur world champion, had turned professional.

== Men's Amateurs race ==
In the amateur race, Robert Vermeire, who finished third last year, emerged victorious. José María Basualdo took second place, becoming the first Spanish medalist in the history of the World Championships.

== Men's Elite race ==
In the professional race, three-time former world champion Rolf Wolfshohl battled it out with the De Vlaeminck brothers and Belgian champion Albert Van Damme. Roger De Vlaeminck fell significantly behind in the final lap. The three remaining title contenders initially crashed together while overtaking the lapped Günter Weiss. 500 meters from the finish, while passing a maintenance depot, Wolfshohl crashed again, likely caused by a careless maneuver from a Belgian mechanic. In the final sprint, Van Damme misjudged a gear, allowing De Vlaeminck to distance him. He celebrated a little too early, however, allowing Van Damme to close the gap to within a tire's width. This was the first sprint finish between two riders since 1950 and the closest in World Championship history. A protest by the German team was rejected, as no intent could be proven on the part of the Belgian mechanic.

== Men's Elite results ==
RANK	1970 UCI CYCLO-CROSS WORLD CHAMPIONSHIPS	TIME
Gold medal	Erik De Vlaeminck (BEL)	01:03:50
Silver medal	Albert Van Damme (BEL)	s.t.
Bronze medal	Rolf Wolfshohl (BRD)	+ 0:24
4.	Roger De Vlaeminck (BEL)	+ 1:33
5.	Renato Longo (ITA)	+ 2:06
6.	Julien Vanden Haesevelde (BEL)	+ 3:22
7.	John Atkins (GBR)	s.t.
8.	Hermann Gretener (SUI)	+ 4:31
9.	Ernst Boller (SUI)	+ 4:43
10.	Michel Pelchat (FRA)	+ 5:08

== Men's Amateurs results ==
RANK	1970 UCI CYCLO-CROSS WORLD CHAMPIONSHIPS	TIME
Gold medal	Robert Vermeire (BEL)	00:56:12
Silver medal	José María Basualdo (ESP)	+ 0:24
Bronze medal	Norbert Dedeckere (BEL)	+ 1:14
4.	René De Clercq (BEL)	+ 1:34
5.	Wolfgang Renner (BRD)}	+ 2:34
6.	Roger Bijn (BEL)	+ 2:42
7.	Gertie Wildeboer (NED)	+ 2:49
8.	Karl Stähle (BRD)}	+ 2:55
9.	Luigi Torresani (ITA)	+ 3:18
10.	José María Gonzalez (ESP)	+ 3:19
