= 1974 UCI Cyclo-cross World Championships =

Cyclo-cross championship

- Venue: Vera de Bidasoa, Spain
- Date: 24 February 1974
- Coordinates: 43°16′50″N 1°40′55″W
- Cyclists participating: 17 (Elite); 46 (Amateurs)
- Events: 1

The 1974 UCI Cyclo-cross World Championships were held in Vera de Bidasoa, Spain on Sunday February 23, 1969. It was the 25th edition of the UCI Cyclo-cross World Championships.

== Venue ==
The course, whose length was stated to be 2,975 meters, was located on the slopes around the town and was characterized by steep climbs and equally steep descents. It was ridden eight times by professionals and seven times by amateurs, one lap less than originally announced. The professionals climbed over 1000 meters in altitude.

== Men's Amateurs race ==
In the amateur race, the two best drivers from last year, Klaus-Peter Thaler and Robert Vermeire, were once again superior to the competition. Thaler tried to put Vermeire under pressure during the first three laps, but Vermeire attacked in the fourth lap, continuously increasing his lead and clearly taking his third title. Thaler won silver, Ekkehard Teichreber came third, like last year.

== Men's Elite race ==
The professional race initially took place in front of 20,000 spectators with only 17 participants. Several influential figures from previous years were no longer present: Rolf Wolfshohl had ended his career, as had Renato Longo before him, and defending champion Erik De Vlaeminck was suffering from serious personal problems. His brother Roger De Vlaeminck, amateur world champion in 1968, took part in the race in his place and was considered the favorite alongside Albert Van Damme. The latter took the lead right from the start, and apart from De Vlaeminck, only Peter Frischknecht and last year's vice world champion André Wilhelm were able to keep up with his pace at the beginning. On the second lap, Wilhelm crashed and retired, while Frischknecht fell back with a puncture. In the third lap, De Vlaeminck was no longer able to follow Van Damme, who was 10 kg lighter, on the climbs. He won the title with a big lead, 13 years after his first World Cup participation. There was a sprint between De Vlaeminck and Frischknecht for second place, which the Belgian won.

== Men's Elite results ==
RANK	1974 UCI CYCLO-CROSS WORLD CHAMPIONSHIPS	TIME
Gold medal	Albert Van Damme (BEL)	01:19:14
Silver medal	Roger De Vlaeminck (BEL)	+ 1:46
Bronze medal	Peter Frischknecht (SUI)	+ 1:49
4.	Pierre Bernet (FRA)	+ 3:36
5.	Hermann Gretener (SUI)	+ 4:20
6.	Julien Vanden Haesevelde (BEL)	+ 4:22
7.	Michel Baele (BEL)	+ 4:53
8.	José María González Pérez (ESP)	+ 5:07
9.	Juan Gorostidi (ESP)	+ 5:24
10.	Albert Zweifel (SUI)	+ 5:31

== Men's Amateurs results ==
RANK	1974 UCI CYCLO-CROSS WORLD CHAMPIONSHIPS	TIME
Gold medal	Robert Vermeire (BEL)	01:08:01
Silver medal	Klaus-Peter Thaler (BRD)	+ 1:13
Bronze medal	Ekkehard Teichreber (BRD)	+ 2:26
4.	Franco Vagneur (ITA)	+ 2:57
5.	Czesław Polewiak (POL)	+ 3:05
6.	Ueli Müller (SUI)	+ 3:13
7.	Alex Gérardin (FRA)	+ 3:15
8.	Vojtěch Červínek (CZE)	+ 3:17
9.	Klaus Jördens (BRD)	+ 3:36
10.	Gerrit Scheffer (NED)	+ 3:59
