= 1973 UCI Cyclo-cross World Championships =

Cyclo-cross championship

- Official program booklet

- Venue: London, United Kingdom
- Date: 25 February 1973
- Coordinates: 51°30′26″N 0°7′39″W
- Cyclists participating: 18 (Elite); 50 (Amateurs)
- Events: 2

The 1973 UCI Cyclo-cross World Championships were held in London, England on Sunday February 25, 1973. Organized for a first time in the United Kingdom, it was the 24th edition of the UCI Cyclo-cross World Championships.

== Venue ==
The venue was Crystal Palace Park. A three kilometer long circuit had to be ridden seven times by the amateurs and eight times by the professionals, plus a 230 m long starting straight. It consisted of 850 m asphalt, 1900 m meadows, 100 m gravel paths and 150 m running sections.

13 national teams with teams of four took part in the amateur race. The United States took part for the first time. Australia was also announced to be taking part, but for unknown reasons it did not take place. 18 drivers from 7 nations started in the professional race; Italy was no longer represented in this category after Renato Longo's resignation. The Belgian champion Albert Van Damme was considered the big favorite, and his next challengers were Rolf Wolfshohl and André Wilhelm. Defending champion Erik De Vlaeminck had hardly been in form over the past few months and was only reluctantly accepted by the Belgian association.

== Men's Amateurs race ==
The amateurs started first in front of 15,000 spectators. In the second round, the two-time former world champion Robert Vermeire and Klaus-Peter Thaler formed a leading group and, despite a narrow lead, were no longer caught; Thaler beat Vermeire in a sprint. The 23-year-old Thaler's victory was considered a big surprise, breaking the Belgian winning streak that had lasted since 1968. Among the pursuers, defending champion Norbert Dedeckere fell behind in the fifth round due to a defect, so that Ekkehard Teichreber won the bronze medal after two fourth places in previous years.

== Men's Elite race ==
In the professional race, Erik De Vlaeminck, Van Damme, Wolfshohl and Wilhelm immediately set themselves apart from the competition. Wilhelm fell back a little on the third lap, but remained within striking distance. Wolfshohl lost time due to a breakdown on the sixth lap, and De Vlaeminck left his Belgian rival behind on a steep climb. However, Wolfshohl came back, overtook Van Damme and pulled Wilhelm with him, so that there was a sprint between three drivers for the first time at the World Championships. De Vlaeminck won this ahead of Wilhelm and Wolfshohl and became world champion for the seventh time.

== Men's Elite results ==
RANK	1973 UCI CYCLO-CROSS WORLD CHAMPIONSHIPS	TIME
Gold medal	Erik De Vlaeminck (BEL)	00:59:29
Silver medal	André Wilhelm (FRA)	s.t.
Bronze medal	Rolf Wolfshohl (BRD)	s.t.
4.	Albert Van Damme (BEL)	+ 0:38
5.	Michel Baele (BEL)	+ 2:37
6.	Peter Frischknecht (SUI)	s.t.
7.	John Atkins (GBR)	s.t.
8.	José María Basualdo (ESP)	+ 3:43
9.	Julien Vanden Haesevelde (BEL)	+ 3:56
10.	Keith Mernickle (GBR)	+ 4:07

== Men's Amateurs results ==
RANK	1973 UCI CYCLO-CROSS WORLD CHAMPIONSHIPS	TIME
Gold medal	Klaus-Peter Thaler (BRD)	00:54:04
Silver medal	Robert Vermeire (BEL)	s.t.
Bronze medal	Ekkehard Teichreber (BRD)	+ 0:22
4.	Norbert Dedeckere (BEL)	+ 0:32
5.	Albert Zweifel (SUI)	+ 0:43
6.	Miloš Fišera (CZE)	+ 1:08
7.	Franco Livian (ITA)	+ 1:10
8.	Dieter Uebing (BRD)	+ 1:15
9.	Klaus Jördens (BRD)	+ 1:32
10.	Gerrit Scheffer (NED)	+ 1:37
