= 1956 UCI Cyclo-cross World Championships =

Cyclo-cross championship

- Venue: Luxembourg, Luxembourg
- Date: 19 February 1956
- Coordinates: 49°49′N 6°8′E
- Cyclists participating: 37
- Events: 1

The 1956 Cyclo-cross World Championship was the seventh edition of the UCI Cyclo-cross World Championships.

It was held on February 19, 1956, at the Baumbusch circuit in Luxembourg, the capital of the Grand Duchy of the same name. Luxembourg was the first country to host the race for a second time, with the capital once again serving as the venue.

Originally, the course, just over four kilometers long, was to be completed seven times. Due to a combination of weather conditions and the terrain, the race was shortened to six laps, bringing the total distance to 24.3 kilometers. Approximately 10,000 spectators watched 37 riders in action. Four riders each from nine countries, including Czechoslovakia, which entered a team for the first time, started. The Netherlands—returning after its first participation in 1951—was the only country to have a competitor.

After 1952 and 1954, two Frenchmen and a Swiss again stood on the podium. André Dufraisse secured his third consecutive title with his sixth consecutive podium finish. His compatriot Georges Meunier (4th in 1950 and 1951) took second place, and third place went to Emmanuel Plattner.

== Men's Elite ==
RANK	1956 UCI CYCLO-CROSS WORLD CHAMPIONSHIPS	TIME
Gold medal	André Dufraisse (FRA)	01:25:02
Silver medal	Georges Meunier (FRA)	+ 0:34
Bronze medal	Emmanuel Plattner (SUI)	+ 0:54
4.	Hans Bieri (SUI)	+ 1:44
5.	Charly Gaul (LUX)	+ 2:05
6.	Pierre Jodet (FRA)	+ 2:45
7.	Heinrich Ruffenach (SAA)	+ 3:06
8.	Jempy Schmitz (LUX)	+ 3:09
9.	Frans Feremans (BEL)	+ 3:20
10.	Johny Goedert (LUX)	+ 4:00
