= 1967 UCI Cyclo-cross World Championships =

Cyclo-cross championship

- Venue: Zurich, Switzerland
- Date: 19 February 1967
- Coordinates: 47°22′28″N 08°32′28″E
- Cyclists participating: 62
- Events: 2

The 1967 UCI Cyclo-cross World Championships were held in Zürich, Switzerland on Sunday February 19, 1967. It was the 18th edition of the UCI Cyclo-cross World Championships.

For the first time, a competition was also organised for amateurs.

The professionals had to contend not only with the already difficult and waterlogged course, but also with the fact that the terrain had been churned up by the amateurs beforehand. Renato Longo dominated the race from the start and won his fifth world championship title without any real challenge. Behind him, gaps unprecedented in a world championship race opened up: Rolf Wolfshohl won the silver medal almost four minutes behind, while Hermann Gretener finished third over nine minutes after Longo. Emanuel Plattner and the defeated defending champion Erik De Vlaeminck followed, with all other riders being lapped. Only at the 1979 World Championships would the winner have an even greater gap to the runner-up. Twenty riders were classified; the rest abandoned the race. According to various sources, between 12,000 and 20,000 spectators attended the event. Italy won the combined team classification for both competitions.

== Men's Elite ==
RANK	1967 UCI CYCLO-CROSS WORLD CHAMPIONSHIPS	TIME
Gold medal	Renato Longo (ITA)	01:17:32
Silver medal	Rolf Wolfshohl (BRD)	+ 3:49
Bronze medal	Hermann Gretener (SUI)	+ 9:14
4.	Emmanuel Plattner (SUI)	s.t.
5.	Erik De Vlaeminck (BEL)	+ 11:48
6.	Huub Harings (NED)	+ 1 tour
7.	Giovanni Bettinelli (ITA)	+ 1 tour
8.	Luciano Luciani (ITA)	+ 1 tour
9.	Manuel Nava (SPA)	+ 1 tour
10.	André Foucher (FRA)	+ 1 tour

== Men's Amateurs ==
RANK	1967 UCI CYCLO-CROSS WORLD CHAMPIONSHIPS	TIME
Gold medal	Michel Pelchat (FRA)	01:10:36
Silver medal	Julien Vanden Haesevelde (BEL)	+ 2:20
Bronze medal	Peter Frischknecht (SUI)	+ 2:24
4.	Jean Gérardin (FRA)	+ 2:52
5.	Franco Livian (ITA)}	+ 2:57
6.	Pierre Bernet (FRA)	+ 3:18
7.	Enrico Sfolcini (ITA)	+ 3:40
8.	Luigi Torresani (ITA)	+ 3:52
9.	Karl Stähle (BRD)	+ 4:41
10.	Ernst Boller (SUI)	s.t.
