= Ronde van West-Vlaanderen =

Belgian cycling race

Race details
- Date: March, May, August, September
- Region: Flanders, Belgium
- English name: Tour of West-Flanders
- Local name(s): Ronde van West-Vlaanderen (in Dutch), Tour de Flandre Occidentale (in French)
- Discipline: Road
- Competition: Cat. 1.2
- Type: One-day race

History
- First edition: 1960
- Editions: 19
- Final edition: 1978
- First winner: Henri De Wolf (BEL)
- Most wins: Eric De Vlaeminck (BEL); Guido Reybrouck (BEL); (2 wins)
- Final winner: Cees Priem (NED)

The Ronde van West-Vlaanderen was a cycling race organized for the last time in 1978.

The course was situated in West-Flanders. The competition's roll of honor includes the successes of Eddy Merckx and Eric De Vlaeminck.

== Winners ==
Year	Winner	Second	Third
1960	(Belgium) Henri De Wolf	(Belgium) Louis Lemarcq	(Belgium) Fernand Tuytens
1961	(Belgium) Gilbert Desmet	(Belgium) Armand Desmet	(Belgium) Gustaaf De Smet
1962	(Belgium) Leon Gevaert	(Belgium) Fernand Tuytens	(Belgium) Gabriel Borra
1963	(Belgium) Leon Van Daele	(Belgium) André Noyelle	(Belgium) Albert Covens
1964	(Belgium) Bernard Van de Kerckhove	(Belgium) Fernand Deferm	(Belgium) Oswald Declercq
1965	(Belgium) Guido Reybrouck	(Belgium) Herman Van Loo	(Belgium) Karel Colpaert
1966	(Belgium) Omer Ballegeer	(Belgium) Clément Roman	(Belgium) Walter Godefroot
1967	(Belgium) Willy Bocklant	(Belgium) Walter Godefroot	(Belgium) Herman Van Loo
1968	(Belgium) Roger Rosiers	(Belgium) Eric Demunster	(Belgium) Jean Monteyne
1969	(Belgium) Eric De Vlaeminck	(Netherlands) Leen Poortvliet	(Netherlands) Harm Ottenbros
1970	(Belgium) Eric De Vlaeminck	(Belgium) Noël Van Clooster	(Belgium) Gustaaf Van Roosbroeck
1971	(Belgium) Jacques Clauwaert	(Belgium) Roger Cooreman	(Belgium) Herman Vrijders
1972	(Belgium) Guido Reybrouck	(Belgium) Raphael Van Bruane	(Belgium) Fernand Hermie
1973	(Belgium) Eddy Goossens	(Belgium) Dirk Baert	(Belgium) Noël Van Clooster
1974	(Belgium) Ronny Vanmarcke	(Belgium) Freddy Maertens	(France) Jean-Louis Danguillaume
1975	(Belgium) Michel Pollentier	(Belgium) Herman Vrijders	(Belgium) Alfons De Bal
1976	(Belgium) Eddy Merckx	(Belgium) Willy De Geest	(Belgium) Marc Renier
1977	(Belgium) Willy Planckaert	(Republic of Ireland) Sean Kelly	(Belgium) Ronald De Witte
1978	(Netherlands) Cees Priem	(Netherlands) Aad van den Hoek	(Netherlands) Jan Raas
