= 1964 UCI Cyclo-cross World Championships =

Cyclo-cross championship

- Official program booklet

- Venue: Overboelare, Belgium
- Date: 16 February 1964
- Coordinates: 50°46′N 03°52′E
- Cyclists participating: 42
- Events: 1

The 1964 UCI Cyclo-cross World Championships were held in Overboelare, Belgium on Sunday February 16, 1964. It was the 15th edition of the UCI Cyclo-cross World Championships.

The race took place on the right side of the Dender river, with the start on the site of today's airfield and a detour to the Boelare forest. There were seven laps of a 3.1 km long course, which, together with an inrun section at the start, resulted in a total length of 23,050 m. The course was considered to be rather easy in advance, but this was not the case on site, also because rain softened the course before and during the race.

From the third lap onwards, Renato Longo took the lead, which no one would challenge him anymore; he won his third title in a dominant manner. Behind him the positions changed frequently, and a group of four riders ended up fighting for the medals. Home rider Roger De Clercq, who had been in the top ten many times since 1953, came second and was on the podium for the first time. For third-placed Joseph Mahé, however, it was his first World Championship participation.

For the first time at the World Championships, all riders who started (42) reached the finish.

== Men's Elite ==
RANK	1964 UCI CYCLO-CROSS WORLD CHAMPIONSHIPS	TIME
Gold medal	Renato Longo (ITA)	00:56:26
Silver medal	Roger De Clercq (BEL)	+ 1:48
Bronze medal	Joseph Mahé (FRA)	s.t.
4.	Michel Pelchat (FRA)	+ 1:50
5.	Albert Van Damme (BEL)	s.t.
6.	Amerigo Severini (ITA)	+ 2:10
7.	René De Rey (BEL)	+ 2:19
8.	Pierre Bernet (FRA)	+ 2:23
9.	Jean Gérardin (FRA)	+ 2:28
10.	Emmanuel Plattner (SUI)	+ 2:52
