= 1955 UCI Cyclo-cross World Championships =

Cyclo-cross championship

- Venue: (Saar Protectorate) Saarbrücken, Saarland
- Date: 28 February 1954
- Coordinates: 49°14′N 7°0′E
- Cyclists participating: 36
- Events: 1

The 1954 Cyclo-cross World Championship was the sixth edition of the UCI Cyclo-cross World Championships.

It was held on 6 March 1955 on and around the Kieselhume Hill in the St. Johann district of Saarbrücken in the Protectorate of Saarland.

A course of almost four kilometers had to be lapped six times, bringing the total distance of this edition to 23.700 kilometers. Around 30,000 spectators watched 36 riders from nine countries in action, 33 of whom finished. For the first time, three riders from three different countries stood on the podium. Frenchman André Dufraisse defended his title with his fifth consecutive podium finish. Swiss rider Hans Bieri took second place, one position higher than last year. Amerigo Severini of Italy finished third.

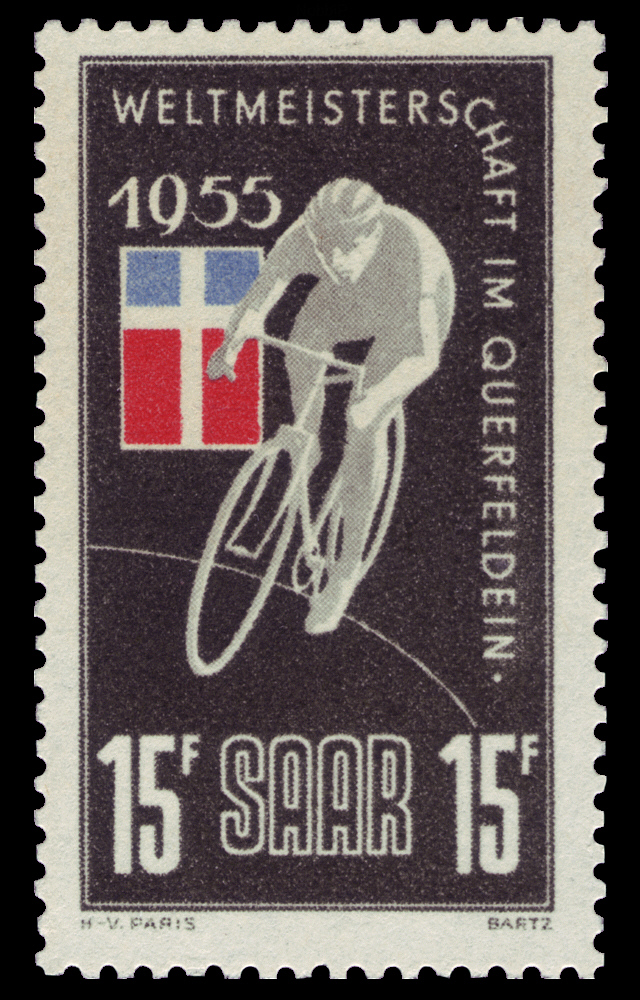
Stamp of the event

== Men's Elite ==
RANK	1955 UCI CYCLO-CROSS WORLD CHAMPIONSHIPS	TIME
Gold medal	André Dufraisse (FRA)	00:55:06
Silver medal	Hans Bieri (SUI)	+ 0:44
Bronze medal	Amerigo Severini (ITA)	+ 0:56
4.	Pierre Jodet (FRA)	+ 1:28
5.	Dante Benvenutti (ITA)	+ 1:32
6.	Roger Rondeaux (FRA)	+ 1:47
7.	Gérard Durand (FRA)	+ 2:07
8.	Mario Rossi (ITA)	+ 2:07
9.	Lothar Friedrich (SAA)	+ 2:07
10.	Herbert Ebbers (BRD)	+ 2:34
