= 1972 UCI Cyclo-cross World Championships =

Cyclo-cross championship

- Official program booklet

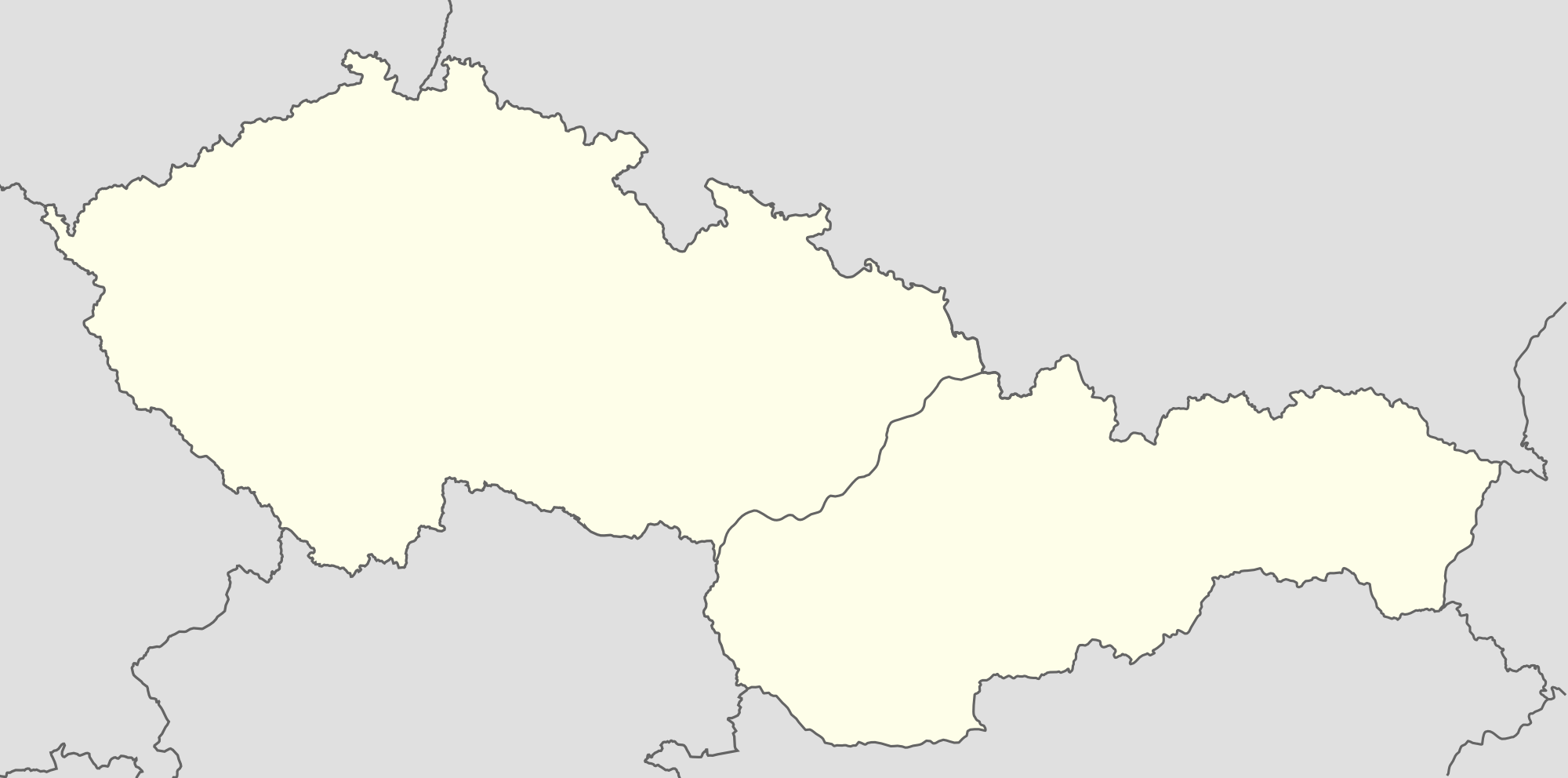
- Venue: (Czech Republic) Prague, Czechoslovakia
- Date: 27 February 1972
- Coordinates: 50°5′15″N 14°25′17″E
- Cyclists participating: 27 (Elite); 52 (Amateurs)
- Events: 2

The 1972 UCI Cyclo-cross World Championships were held in Prague, on Sunday February 27, 1972. Organized for a first time in Czechoslovakia, it was the 23rd edition of the UCI Cyclo-cross World Championships.

== Men's Amateurs race ==
In front of 12,000 spectators, 54 amateurs started the race. Miloš Fišera immediately took the initiative in front of his home crowd, launching several attacks, but he was never able to break away completely. From the fifth lap onward, he formed a leading trio with Norbert Dedeckere and Wolfgang Renner, about 15 seconds ahead of a small chase group, while defending champion Robert Vermeire dropped back with a mechanical. On the final lap, Fišera attacked again, but was caught and lost crucial time during a wheel change. Dedeckere ultimately won by five seconds, while Fišera managed to overtake Renner on the final climb. His second-place finish secured his country's first medal at the World Championships.

== Men's Elite race ==
The professional race, which reportedly had between 23 and 27 riders, was far less exciting. Erik De Vlaeminck and Rolf Wolfshohl broke away from the field in the first lap, and from the second lap onward, De Vlaeminck led alone. Although his lead over Wolfshohl grew only slowly, his victory was never in doubt, and with his sixth title, he was now the sole record holder for most world championships. Wolfshohl finished second, almost half a minute behind. Two minutes later, a group of four riders battled for the bronze medal, with Hermann Gretener emerging victorious. Despite his foot injury, Albert Van Damme finished fourth, ahead of José María Basualdo, the previous year's amateur world championship runner-up. 5-time world champion Renato Longo finished 13th.

== Men's Elite results ==
RANK	1972 UCI CYCLO-CROSS WORLD CHAMPIONSHIPS	TIME
Gold medal	Erik De Vlaeminck (BEL)	01:08:40
Silver medal	Rolf Wolfshohl (BRD)	+ 0:27
Bronze medal	Hermann Gretener (SUI)	+ 2:21
4.	Albert Van Damme (BEL)	+ 2:28
5.	José María Basualdo (ESP)	+ 2:30
6.	Julien Vanden Haesevelde (BEL)	+ 2:37
7.	André Wilhelm (FRA)	+ 3:37
8.	Michel Baele (BEL)	+ 3:58
9.	Peter Frischknecht (SUI)	+ 4:18
10.	José María Gonzáles (ESP)	+ 4:20

== Men's Amateurs results ==
RANK	1972 UCI CYCLO-CROSS WORLD CHAMPIONSHIPS	TIME
Gold medal	Norbert Dedeckere (BEL)	01:03:30
Silver medal	Miloš Fišera (CZE)	+ 0:05
Bronze medal	Wolfgang Renner (BRD)	+ 0:11
4.	Ekkehard Teichreber (BRD)	+ 0:14
5.	Karl Stähle (BRD)	+ 0:15
6.	Gertie Wildeboer (NED)	+ 0:26
7.	Pavel Krejčí (CZE)	+ 0:38
8.	Vojtěch Červínek (CZE)	+ 0:53
9.	Jiří Murdych (CZE)	+ 0:57
10.	Robert Vermeire (BEL)	+ 1:06
