= 1959 UCI Cyclo-cross World Championships =

Cyclo-cross championship

- Venue: Geneva, Switzerland
- Date: 15 February 1959
- Coordinates: 46°12′06″N 06°08′49″E
- Cyclists participating: 29
- Events: 1

The 1959 Cyclo-cross World Championship was the tenth edition of the UCI Cyclo-cross World Championships. It was a second time the event was organized in Geneva, Switzerland, after the 1952 championships.

The course included five laps of four kilometers and a final 2.24-kilometer loop, bringing the total length to 22.24 kilometers. The 29 participants came from seven countries, each sending a team of three or four riders, plus one rider each from the Netherlands and East Germany.

Italian Renato Longo became the fourth cyclocross world champion in his second participation—he finished fourth in 1958.

== Men's Elite ==
RANK	1958 UCI CYCLO-CROSS WORLD CHAMPIONSHIPS	TIME
Gold medal	Renato Longo (ITA)	00:56:39
Silver medal	Rolf Wolfshohl (BRD)	+ 0:14
Bronze medal	Amerigo Severini (ITA)	+ 0:24
4.	André Dufraisse (FRA)	+ 1:39
5.	Jempy Schmitz (LUX)	+ 1:54
6.	Firmin Van Kerrebroeck (BEL)	+ 2:23
7.	André Brulé (FRA)	+ 2:58
8.	Antonio Barrutia (SPA)	+ 2:58
9.	Romano Ferri (ITA)	+ 3:21
10.	Pierre Kumps (BEL)	+ 3:25
