= Jaarmarktcross Niel =

Jaarmarktcross

Race details
- Date: November 11th
- Region: Niel, Belgium
- Discipline: Cyclo-cross
- Competition: Superprestige

History
- First edition: 1964
- Editions: 35 (as of 2026)
- First winner: Pierre Kumps (BEL)
- Most wins: Sven Nys (BEL) (6 wins)
- Most recent: Cameron Mason (GBR)

The Niel Jaarmarkt Cyclo-cross is a cyclo-cross race held in Niel, Belgium.

Until 2008 the race was part of the Cyclo-cross Gazet van Antwerpen. From 2009 to 2017 it was part of the Soudal Classics. From 2018-2019 it was part of the DVV Trophy. In 2020 it moved to the Superprestige series.

== Past winners ==
=== Men ===
Year	Winner
2026	(United Kingdom) Cameron Mason
2025	(Belgium) Laurens Sweeck
2024	(Belgium) Laurens Sweeck
2023	(Belgium) Eli Iserbyt
2022	(Belgium) Laurens Sweeck
2021	(Belgium) Eli Iserbyt
2020	(Belgium) Laurens Sweeck
2019	(Netherlands) Mathieu van der Poel
2018	(Netherlands) Mathieu van der Poel
2017	(Belgium) Toon Aerts
2016	(Belgium) Toon Aerts
2015	(Belgium) Kevin Pauwels
2014	(Belgium) Sven Nys
2013	(Belgium) Sven Nys
2012	(Belgium) Niels Albert
2011	(Belgium) Sven Nys
2010	(Belgium) Sven Nys
2009	(Belgium) Sven Nys
2008	(Netherlands) Lars Boom
2007	(Belgium) Bart Wellens
2006	(Belgium) Bart Wellens
2005	(Belgium) Sven Nys
2004	(Netherlands) Richard Groenendaal
2003	(Belgium) Bart Wellens
2002	(Belgium) Bart Wellens
2001	(Belgium) Peter Van Santvliet
2000	(Belgium) Erwin Vervecken
1999	(Belgium) Arno Daelmans
1998	(Belgium) Mario De Clercq
1997	(Netherlands) Adrie van der Poel
1996	(Belgium) Marc Janssens
1995	(Belgium) Paul Herygers
1994	(Belgium) Paul Herygers
1993	(Belgium) Danny De Bie
1992	(Belgium) Marc Janssens
1991	(Belgium) Guy Van Dijck
1990	(Belgium) Marc Janssens
1989	(Belgium) Danny De Bie
1988	(Belgium) Rudy De Bie
1987	(Belgium) Roland Liboton
1986	(Belgium) Christian Hautekeete
1985	(Belgium) Roland Liboton
1984	(Netherlands) Hennie Stamsnijder
1983	(Belgium) Roland Liboton
1982	(Belgium) Roland Liboton
1981	(Netherlands) Hennie Stamsnijder
1980	(Belgium) Roland Liboton
1979	(Belgium) Robert Vermeire
1978	(Belgium) Robert Vermeire
1977	(Belgium) Eric De Bruyne
1976	(Belgium) Robert Vermeire
1975	(Belgium) Robert Vermeire
1974	(Belgium) André Geirland
1973	(Belgium) André Geirland
1972	(Belgium) Robert Vermeire
1971	(Belgium) Albert Van Damme
1970	(Belgium) Erik De Vlaeminck
1969	(Belgium) Freddy Nijs
1968	(Belgium) Erik De Vlaeminck
1967	(Belgium) Erik De Vlaeminck
1966	(Belgium) Erik De Vlaeminck
1965	(Belgium) Erik De Vlaeminck
1964	(Belgium) Pierre Kumps
1963	(Belgium) René De Rey

=== Women ===
Year	Winner
2026	(Netherlands) Manon Bakker
2025	(Netherlands) Lucinda Brand
2024	(Netherlands) Ceylin del Carmen Alvarado
2023	(Netherlands) Ceylin del Carmen Alvarado
2022	(Netherlands) Ceylin del Carmen Alvarado
2021	(Netherlands) Lucinda Brand
2020	(Netherlands) Lucinda Brand
2019	(Netherlands) Lucinda Brand
2018	(Belgium) Sanne Cant
2017	(United Kingdom) Nikki Brammeier
2016	(Belgium) Sanne Cant
2015	(Belgium) Sanne Cant
2014	(Belgium) Sanne Cant
2013	(Belgium) Sanne Cant
2012	(United Kingdom) Nikki Harris
