= 2027 UCI Cyclo-cross World Championships =

Cycling championship in Ostend, Belgium

- Venue: Ostend, Belgium
- Date: 29–31 January 2027
- Coordinates: 51°13′33″N 02°55′10″E

The 2027 UCI Cyclo-cross World Championships will be the 78th edition of the UCI Cyclo-cross World Championships. It will be the annual world championship for the cycling discipline of cyclo-cross. It is scheduled to run from 29 to 31 January in Ostend, Belgium. The championships will be organized by the Union Cycliste Internationale and Flanders Classics.
