= 1963 UCI Cyclo-cross World Championships =

Cyclo-cross championship

- Venue: Calais, France
- Date: 17 February 1963
- Coordinates: 50°56′53″N 01°51′23″E
- Cyclists participating: 41
- Events: 1

The 1963 UCI Cyclo-cross World Championships were held in Calais, France on Sunday February 17, 1963. It was the 14th edition of the UCI Cyclo-cross World Championships.

The race took place on the dunes near Fort Risban, situated between the harbor basin and the open sea. The area is now largely built over. The just over 20-kilometer course was considered favorable for road cyclists: each of the six laps included 1,800 meters of paved road, and the rest of the course was also largely rideable, although snow and rain had softened the terrain somewhat. Rolf Wolfshohl was therefore considered the favorite, especially since the defending champion, Renato Longo, was hampered by a shoulder injury. The race was now also being broadcast on television; Télé Luxembourg, for example, aired a two-hour report. Wolfshohl became world champion for a third time. He crossed the finish line after just 45:52 minutes, making this the fastest World Championship ever.

== Men's Elite ==
RANK	1963 UCI CYCLO-CROSS WORLD CHAMPIONSHIPS	TIME
Gold medal	Rolf Wolfshohl (BRD)	00:45:52
Silver medal	Renato Longo (ITA)	+ 1:20
Bronze medal	André Dufraisse (FRA)	+ 2:39
4.	Amerigo Severini (ITA)	+ 2:39
5.	Roger De Clercq (BEL)	+ 3:04
6.	Albert Van Damme (BEL)	+ 3:08
7.	Pierre Bernet (FRA)	+ 3:10
8.	André Foucher (FRA)	+ 3:18
9.	Huub Harings (NED)	+ 3:28
10.	Winfried Bölke (BRD)	+ 3:45
