= 1952 UCI Cyclo-cross World Championships =

Cyclo-cross championship

- Venue: Geneva, Switzerland
- Date: 24 February 1952
- Coordinates: 46°12′06″N 06°08′49″E
- Cyclists participating: 21
- Events: 1

The 1952 Cyclo-cross World Championship was the third edition of the UCI Cyclo-cross World Championships.

It was held on February 24th in Geneva, Switzerland. Riders from six countries participated. The nearly three-kilometer course had to be lapped seven times, bringing the total distance to 20,045 kilometers. Roger Rondeaux retained his title, having already finished second in 1950. André Dufraisse finished second, just as he had in 1951. Swiss rider Albert Meier prevented the podium from becoming an all-French affair for the third time, finishing ahead of Frenchman Pierre Jodet, who had finished third in both previous years.

== Men's Elite ==
RANK	1952 UCI CYCLO-CROSS WORLD CHAMPIONSHIPS	TIME
Gold medal	Roger Rondeaux (FRA)	01:13:56
Silver medal	André Dufraisse (FRA)	+ 2:04
Bronze medal	Albert Meier (SUI)	+ 2:52
4.	Pierre Jodet (FRA)	+ 3:15
5.	Sergio Toigo (ITA)	+ 3:15
6.	Pierre Champion (SUI)}	+ 3:43
7.	Roland Fantini (SUI)	+ 3:54
8.	Firmin Van Kerrebroeck (BEL)	+ 5:43
9.	Antonin Canavese (FRA)	+ 6:23
10.	Luigi Malabrocca (ITA)	+ 7:00
