= 1965 UCI Cyclo-cross World Championships =

Cyclo-cross championship

- Venue: Cavaria con Premezzo, Italy
- Date: 14 February 1965
- Coordinates: 45°42′N 8°48′E
- Cyclists participating: 41
- Events: 1

The 1965 UCI Cyclo-cross World Championships were held in Cavaria con Premezzo, Italy on Sunday February 14, 1965. It was the 16th edition of the UCI Cyclo-cross World Championships.

Twelve teams participated, setting a new record. As in the previous year, teams came from Algeria, Belgium, Germany, France, Great Britain, Italy, Luxembourg, the Netherlands, Switzerland, Spain, and Czechoslovakia; Bulgaria also participated for the first time with one driver.

Renato Longo and Rolf Wolfshohl, who had each won three of the last six World Championships, broke away from the competition in the first lap and built up a lead of up to one and a half minutes. In the final running section, approximately 1 km from the finish, Longo managed to create the decisive gap and won by 13 seconds. Amerigo Severini finished third. The race was watched by around 20,000 spectators.

== Men's Elite ==
RANK	1965 UCI CYCLO-CROSS WORLD CHAMPIONSHIPS	TIME
Gold medal	Renato Longo (ITA)	00:58:23
Silver medal	Rolf Wolfshohl (BRD)	+ 0:13
Bronze medal	Amerigo Severini (ITA)	+ 1:21
4.	Roger De Clercq (BEL)	+ 2:09
5.	Amelio Mendijur (ESP)	+ 3:06
6.	Albert Van Damme (BEL)	+ 3:32
7.	Pierre Bernet (FRA)	+ 3:45
8.	Léon Scheirs (BEL)	+ 3:46
9.	Joseph Mahé (FRA)	+ 3:50
10.	Huub Harings (NED)	+ 4:26
