= 1961 UCI Cyclo-cross World Championships =

Cyclo-cross championship

- Venue: Hanover, West Germany
- Date: 19 February 1961
- Coordinates: 52°22′N 9°43′E
- Cyclists participating: 39
- Events: 1

The 1961 UCI Cyclo-cross World Championships were held in Hanover, West Germany on Sunday February 19, 1961. It was the 12th edition of the UCI Cyclo-cross World Championships.

In spring-like weather, 20,000 spectators watched the action. Rolf Wolfshohl pulled away from his competitors in the first lap and built up a lead of up to half a minute over his closest pursuers, Renato Longo and Maurice Gandolfo. He would stay in the lead and win his second world title in a row, this time in front of a home crowd.

== Men's Elite ==
RANK	1961 UCI CYCLO-CROSS WORLD CHAMPIONSHIPS	TIME
Gold medal	Rolf Wolfshohl (BRD)	01:04:26
Silver medal	Renato Longo (ITA)	+ 0:14
Bronze medal	André Dufraisse (FRA)	+ 1:28
4.	Pierre Kumps (BEL)	+ 1:34
5.	Roger De Clercq (BEL)	+ 1:49
6.	Amerigo Severini (ITA)	+ 2:24
7.	Firmin Van Kerrebroeck (BEL)	+ 2:31
8.	José Luis Talamillo (SPA)	+ 3:14
9.	Albert Van Damme (BEL)	+ 3:16
10.	Emmanuel Plattner (SUI)	+ 3:27
