= Albert Van Damme =

Belgian cyclo-cross cyclist

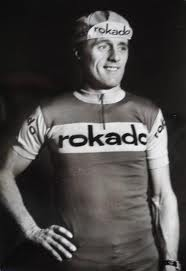

Personal information
- Full name: Albert Van Damme
- Nicknames: Berten; The Lion of Laarne
- Born: 1 December 1940 (age 85) Laarne, Belgium

Cycling career
- Sport: Cycling
- Current team: Retired
- Discipline: Cyclo-cross
- Role: Rider

Professional teams
- 1964–1965: Marcel Kint–Reno
- 1966–68: Goldor
- 1969: Okay–Diamant
- 1970–71: Geens–Watneys
- 1972–73: Rokado
- 1973: Siriki–Munck
- 1974–76: Munck–Beck's
- 1976–77: Marc Zeepcentrale
- 1977–78: IJsboerke–Colnago
- 1977–78: Marc Zeepcentrale–Superia

Major wins
- Cyclo-cross World Champion (1974) Cyclo-cross Belgian Champion (1963, 1965, 1966, 1968, 1970, 1973)
Medal record
Representing Belgium
Men's cyclo-cross
World Championships
Gold medal – first place	Vera De Bidasoa 1974	Elite Men's Race
Silver medal – second place	Zolder 1970	Elite Men's Race
Silver medal – second place	Apeldoorn 1971	Elite Men's Race

Albert "Berten" Van Damme (born 1 December 1940) is a former Belgian cyclo-crosser. He won more than 400 individual races, became six times Belgian National Champion and once World Champion, in 1974. His career lasted from 1959 till 1978.

He was active in the same years as the brothers Eric and Roger De Vlaeminck. Together with his own brother, Daniël Van Damme there was a bit of a "battle" between the two families.

The first Albert Van Damme A-cyclocross race was held in October 2011 and was won by Sven Nys.

== Major results ==
1961
9th World cyclo-cross championship
1963
3rd Jaarmarktcross Niel
6th World cyclo-cross championship
1964
5th World cyclo-cross championship
9th Omloop der Zuid-West-Vlaamse Bergen
1965
6th World cyclo-cross championship
1966
3rd Jaarmarktcross Niel
1968
6th World cyclo-cross championship
1970
2nd World cyclo-cross championship
2nd Jaarmarktcross Niel
1971
1st Jaarmarktcross Niel
2nd World cyclo-cross championship
1972
4th World cyclo-cross championship
1973
4th World cyclo-cross championship
1974
1st World cyclo-cross championship
1975
1st Jaarmarktcross Niel
5th World cyclo-cross championship
1976
1st Jaarmarktcross Niel
9th World cyclo-cross championship
1977
5th World cyclo-cross championship
