= 1954 UCI Cyclo-cross World Championships =

Cyclo-cross championship

- Poster released after the championships

- Venue: Gallarate, Italy
- Date: 28 February 1954
- Coordinates: 45°40′N 8°48′E
- Cyclists participating: 38
- Events: 1

The 1954 Cyclo-cross World Championship was the fitfh edition of the UCI Cyclo-cross World Championships.

It was held on February 28th at the Moraine hill in Gallarate, Italy. A course of just over three kilometers had to be lapped eight times, bringing the total distance of this edition to 24,370 kilometers. Thirty-eight riders from eight countries started, 31 of whom finished. Defending champion Roger Rondeaux broke his frame on the seventh lap while leading the race and was forced to abandon. Belgian Firmin Van Kerrebroeck, who was participating for the fifth time this year, also had to leave the field after a crash.

Just as in 1952, two Frenchmen and a Swiss took the podium. After finishing second, second, and third in 1951, 1952, and 1953, André Dufraisse became the third Frenchman to win the cyclocross world title.

== Men's Elite ==
RANK	1954 UCI CYCLO-CROSS WORLD CHAMPIONSHIPS	TIME
Gold medal	André Dufraisse (FRA)	00:55:06
Silver medal	Pierre Jodet (FRA)	+ 0:44
Bronze medal	Hans Bieri (SUI)	+ 0:56
4.	Georges Furnière (BEL)	+ 1:28
5.	Johny Goedert (LUX)	+ 1:32
6.	Antonio Barrutia (ESP)	+ 1:47
7.	Roger De Clercq (BEL)	+ 2:07
8.	José Michelena (ESP)	+ 2:07
9.	Frans Feremans (BEL)	+ 2:07
10.	Calixte Van Steenbrugge (BEL)	+ 2:34
