= 1957 UCI Cyclo-cross World Championships =

Cyclo-cross championship

- Venue: Edelare, Belgium
- Date: 24 February 1957
- Coordinates: 50°51′N 03°36′E
- Cyclists participating: 39
- Events: 1

The 1957 Cyclo-cross World Championship was the eighth edition of the UCI Cyclo-cross World Championships. For the first time, it was organized in Belgium in Edelare, East Flanders.

Some 30,000 spectators lined a 4,100-meter course, which included the Hell of Kerselare—a fifteen-meter-deep pit—and which had to be circled five times, bringing the total distance of this edition to 20.5 kilometers. Four riders from each of eight countries participated, including the GDR, which sent a team for the first time, three from the Netherlands, and two each from the debuting countries of Hungary and Sweden.

André Dufraisse secured his fourth consecutive title with his seventh consecutive podium finish in as many starts. In his eighth appearance, 'home rider' Firmin Van Kerrebroeck became the first Belgian to reach the podium, finishing second.

== Men's Elite ==
RANK	1957 UCI CYCLO-CROSS WORLD CHAMPIONSHIPS	TIME
Gold medal	André Dufraisse (FRA)	01:17:53
Silver medal	Firmin Van Kerrebroeck (BEL)	+ 1:11
Bronze medal	Georges Meunier (FRA)	+ 2:04
4.	Graziano Pertusi (ITA)	+ 2:54
5.	René De Rey (BEL)	+ 3:58
6.	Albert Meier (SUI)	+ 4:25
7.	Rolf Wolfshohl (BRD)	+ 4:48
8.	Pierre Jodet (FRA)	+ 4:55
9.	Jempy Schmitz (LUX)	+ 5:14
10.	Roger De Clercq (BEL)	+ 5:19
