= Herman Van Loo =

Belgian cyclist

Personal information
- Born: 14 January 1945 Antwerp, Belgium
- Died: 12 October 2017 (aged 72)

Cycling career
- Sport: Cycling

Herman Van Loo (14 January 1945 – 12 October 2017) was a Belgian cyclist. He competed in the individual pursuit event at the 1964 Summer Olympics.
