= 1966 UCI Cyclo-cross World Championships =

Cyclo-cross championship

- Venue: Beasain, Spain
- Date: 27 February 1966
- Coordinates: 43°02′45″N 2°11′22″W
- Cyclists participating: 34
- Events: 1

The 1966 UCI Cyclo-cross World Championships were held in Beasain, in the Basque Country of Spain on Sunday February 27 1966. It was the 17th edition of the UCI Cyclo-cross World Championships.

The race took place in front of 20,000 to 25,000 spectators in good weather conditions. At the start, a leading trio formed, consisting of the world champions of the past seven years, Renato Longo and Rolf Wolfshohl, along with Erik De Vlaeminck, whom the Italian coach had previously identified as Longo's most dangerous competitor. At the beginning of the third lap, Longo broke his front wheel due to a riding error and had to walk a long way to the pit stop. This caused him to fall irretrievably behind and he retired. When the cooperation between Wolfshohl and De Vlaeminck faltered towards the end of the fifth lap, the reigning Swiss champion Hermann Gretener caught up with the two and attacked on a steep climb. De Vlaeminck immediately countered, while Wolfshohl, who was using too high a gear ratio, lost contact with the leaders. Gretener suffered from a slow leak in one tire on the final lap but managed to hold onto second place. De Vlaeminck, just shy of his 21st birthday, became the youngest world champion and also the first Belgian in the history of the World Championships.

All riders except Longo finished the race. The team classification, calculated from the finishing positions of the three best riders from each nation, was won by Belgium, followed by Italy, Germany, and Spain.

== Men's Elite ==
RANK	1966 UCI CYCLO-CROSS WORLD CHAMPIONSHIPS	TIME
Gold medal	Erik De Vlaeminck (BEL)	01:02:57
Silver medal	Hermann Gretener (SUI)	+ 0:12
Bronze medal	Rolf Wolfshohl (BRD)	+ 0:17
4.	Huub Harings (NED)	+ 1:16
5.	Luciano Luciani (ITA)	+ 1:32
6.	Amerigo Severini (ITA)	+ 1:36
7.	Freddy Nijs (BEL)	s.t.
8.	Karl Stähle (BRD)	+ 1:54
9.	Antonio Barrutia (ESP)	+ 1:58
10.	Michel Pelchat (FRA)	s.t.
