= 1958 UCI Cyclo-cross World Championships =

Cyclo-cross championship

- Venue: Limoges, France
- Date: 23 February 1958
- Coordinates: 45°50′07″N 1°15′45″E
- Cyclists participating: 31
- Events: 1

The 1958 Cyclo-cross World Championship was the ninth edition of the UCI Cyclo-cross World Championships.

It was held on Sunday, February 23 1958 in France.

The city of Limoges is located 25 kilometers south of Razès, the birthplace of the then four-time (and reigning) world champion André Dufraisse. The course had a total length of 21.38 kilometers. The 31 participants came from eight countries, each sending a team of three or four riders and one rider from the Netherlands.

Dufraisse secured his fifth consecutive title with his eighth consecutive podium finish after the same number of participations.

== Men's Elite ==
RANK	1950 UCI CYCLO-CROSS WORLD CHAMPIONSHIPS	TIME
Gold medal	André Dufraisse (FRA)	01:11:12
Silver medal	Amerigo Severini (ITA)	+ 0:25
Bronze medal	Rolf Wolfshohl (BRD)	+ 1:02
4.	Renato Longo (ITA)	+ 1:17
5.	André Brulé (FRA)	+ 1:48
6.	Emmanuel Plattner (SUI)	+ 3:00
7.	Jempy Schmitz (LUX)	+ 3:40
8.	Georges Meunier (FRA)	+ 4:05
9.	Otto Furrer (SUI)	+ 4:15
10.	Graziano Pertusi (ITA)	+ 5:50
