= Giovanni Bettinelli =

Italian cyclist

Personal information
- Born: 5 March 1935
- Died: 5 July 2000 (aged 65)

Cycling career
- Sport: Cycling
- Role: Rider

Giovanni Bettinelli (5 March 1935 – 5 July 2000) was an Italian racing cyclist. He rode in the 1962 Tour de France.
