= Roger Rondeaux =

French cyclist

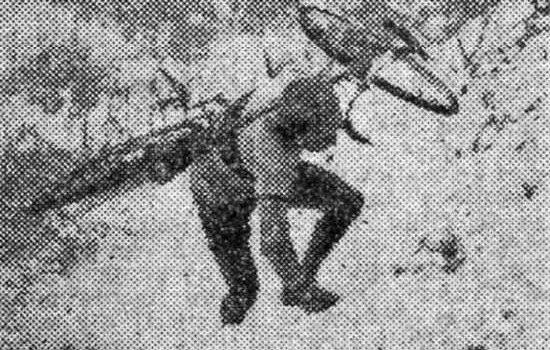
- Rondeaux competing in January 1945 at the Cyclo-cross de Clamart

Personal information
- Born: 15 April 1920 Mareuil-le-Port, France
- Died: 24 January 1999 (aged 78) La Rochelle, France

Cycling career
- Sport: Cycling
- Disciplines: Cyclo-cross; Road

Professional teams
- 1946: Garin–Hutchinson
- 1947–1949: Garin–Wolber
- 1949: Thomann–Dunlop
- 1950–1951: Tigra
- 1951: Terrot–Wolber
- 1952–1956: Terrot–Hutchinson
- 1957: Terrot–BP–Huchinson
- 1957: La France
- 1959: Peugeot–BP–Dunlop
Medal record
Representing France
Men's cyclo-cross
World Championships
Gold medal – first place	1951 Luxembourg	Elite race
Gold medal – first place	1952 Geneva	Elite race
Gold medal – first place	1953 Quato	Elite race
Silver medal – second place	1950 Paris	Elite race

Roger Rondeaux (15 April 1920 – 24 January 1999) was a French cyclo-cross cyclist, who was a professional from 1947 to 1958. Rondeaux won the World Cyclo-cross Championships three times in 1951, 1952, and 1953, and was the French national champion seven times between 1947 and 1954. Rondeaux had been beaten in the first edition of the Cyclo-cross world championships by Jean Robic in a sprint.
