= René De Clercq =

Belgian cyclo-cross cyclist

Personal information
- Born: 16 March 1945 Compiègne, France
- Died: 1 January 2017 (aged 71) Oudenaarde, Belgium

Cycling career
- Sport: Cycling
- Discipline: Cyclo-cross
- Role: Rider

Professional teams
- 1970–1971: Hertekamp–Magniflex
- 1971–1972: Flandria–Mars
- 1973: Novy–Romy Pils–Total–Dubble Bubble
- 1974–1975: Kas–Kaskol
- 1975–1976: Autopark Tum
Medal record
Men's cyclo-cross
Representing Belgium
World Championships
Gold medal – first place	1969 Magstadt	Amateur race
Bronze medal – third place	1971 Apeldoorn	Elite race

René De Clercq (16 March 1945 – 1 January 2017) was a Belgian cyclo-cross cyclist. Professional from 1970 to 1976, he won a bronze medal at the 1971 UCI Cyclo-cross World Championships and was the UCI Amateur World Champion in 1969. He was the brother of Roger De Clercq and the father of Mario De Clercq, also professional cyclists.

== Major results ==
1966–1967
3rd National Championships
1967–1968
3rd National Amateur Championships
1968–1969
1st UCI Amateur World Championships
1969–1970
4th UCI Amateur World Championships
1970–1971
3rd UCI World Championships
3rd National Championships
