= Marc De Block =

Belgian cyclist

Personal information
- Born: 25 July 1945 (age 81) Schelderode, Belgium

Cycling career
- Sport: Cycling
- Current team: Retired
- Disciplines: Cyclo-cross; Road
- Role: Rider

Professional teams
- 1968–1969: Flandria–De Clerck
- 1970–1973: Hertekamp–Magniflex
- 1974–1975: Munck–Beck's
- 1975–1978: Hertekamp

Marc De Block (born 25 July 1945) is a Belgian former professional racing cyclist. He rode in the 1969 Tour de France. He also won the Belgian National Cyclo-cross Championships in 1976 and 1977.
