= 1968 UCI Cyclo-cross World Championships =

Cyclo-cross championship

- Venue: Luxembourg, Luxembourg
- Date: 25 February 1968
- Coordinates: 49°49′N 6°8′E
- Cyclists participating: 64
- Events: 2

The 1968 UCI Cyclo-cross World Championships were held in Luxembourg city, Luxembourg on Sunday February 25, 1968. It was the 19th edition of the UCI Cyclo-cross World Championships.

In the amateur race, which started at 1 p.m., a group of five riders entered the 500-meter finishing straight after several lead changes. Roger De Vlaeminck clearly won the sprint ahead of Peter Frischknecht and Cock van der Hulst, the latter winning the first Dutch medal in the history of the World Championships.

The professional race began at 3:15 p.m.. Two favorites lost their chances of victory in the very first lap: Renato Longo suffered a wheel failure, and Albert Van Damme crashed. By the end of the first lap, Erik De Vlaeminck and Rolf Wolfshohl had taken the lead, followed by Hermann Gretener and Michel Pelchat. De Vlaeminck and Wolfshohl extended their combined lead until Wolfshohl suffered a flat tire. De Vlaeminck then accelerated and continued to increase his advantage. Just like his younger brother in the amateur category, he finished first. All riders were classified; those from 19th place onward had been lapped.

== Men's Elite ==
RANK	1968 UCI CYCLO-CROSS WORLD CHAMPIONSHIPS	TIME
Gold medal	Erik De Vlaeminck (BEL)	01:02:18
Silver medal	Hermann Gretener (SUI)	+ 2:59
Bronze medal	Michel Pelchat (FRA)	s.t.
4.	Luciano Luciani (ITA)	+ 3:35
5.	Huub Harings (NED)	+ 3:59
6.	Albert Van Damme (BEL)	s.t.
7.	Max Gretener (SUI)	s.t.
8.	Jean-Pierre Ducasse (FRA)	+ 4:15
9.	Daniel Grégoire (FRA)	+ 4:45
10.	Renato Longo (ITA)	+ 4:55

== Men's Amateurs ==
RANK	1968 UCI CYCLO-CROSS WORLD CHAMPIONSHIPS	TIME
Gold medal	Roger De Vlaeminck (BEL)	00:58:45
Silver medal	Peter Frischknecht (SUI)	+ 0:02
Bronze medal	Cock van der Hulst (NED)	+ 0:10
4.	Franco Livian (ITA)}	+ 0:12
5.	John Atkins (GBR)}	+ 0:14
6.	Jakob Küster (SUI)	s.t.
7.	Flory Ongenae (BEL)	s.t.
8.	Lucio Colzani (ITA)	+ 0:16
9.	Horst Maier (BRD)	s.t.
10.	Břetislav Souček (CZE)	s.t.
