= Erik De Vlaeminck =

Belgian cyclist (1945–2015)

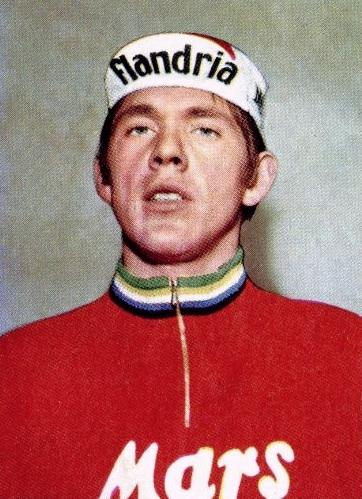
- De Vlaeminck in 1971

Personal information
- Full name: Erik De Vlaeminck
- Born: 23 March 1945 Eeklo, Belgium
- Died: 4 December 2015 (aged 70) Eeklo, Belgium

Cycling career
- Sport: Cycling
- Discipline: Cyclo-cross/Road
- Role: Rider

Professional teams
- 1966: Wiel's-Groene Leeuw
- 1967–68: Goldor
- 1967–72: Flandria
- 1973–75: Brooklyn
- 1976: Gero-Eurosol
- 1977: Gios-Torino
- 1977–79: Marc Zeepcentrale-Superia
- 1979–80: Hertekamp

Major wins
- Grand Tours Tour de France 1 individual stage (1968) Stage races Tour of Belgium (1969) Paris–Luxembourg (1970) One-day races and Classics GP Union Dortmund (1968) Kampioenschap van Vlaanderen (1969) Omloop der Vlaamse Ardennen (1969) Dwars door West-Vlaanderen (1969) Grand Prix of Aargau Canton (1970) Cyclo-cross Championships World Championship (1966, 1968, 1969, 1970, 1971, 1972, 1973) National Championship (1967, 1969, 1971, 1972)
Medal record
Men's cyclo-cross
Representing Belgium
World Championships
| Gold medal – first place | 1966 Beasain | Elite Race |
| Gold medal – first place | 1968 Luxembourg | Elite Race |
| Gold medal – first place | 1969 Magstadt | Elite Race |
| Gold medal – first place | 1970 Zolder | Elite Race |
| Gold medal – first place | 1971 Apeldoorn | Elite Race |
| Gold medal – first place | 1972 Prague | Elite Race |
| Gold medal – first place | 1973 London | Elite Race |
| Bronze medal – third place | 1977 Hanover | Elite Race |

Erik De Vlaeminck (23 March 1945 − 4 December 2015) was a Belgian cyclist who became cyclo-cross world-champion seven times (in 1966, 1968, 1969, 1970, 1971, 1972, 1973), a record for male riders until it was equalled and eventually surpassed by Mathieu van der Poel.

== Professional career ==
De Vlaeminck missed 1967 only because his bike was damaged during the race. He also became Belgian champion four times (1967, 1969, 1971, 1972) at a time when there were so many good Belgian riders that the domestic championship was often harder than the world-championship.

He also performed creditably in road races, including the Tour de France. In 1969 he won the Tour of Belgium and a stage in the Tour de France.

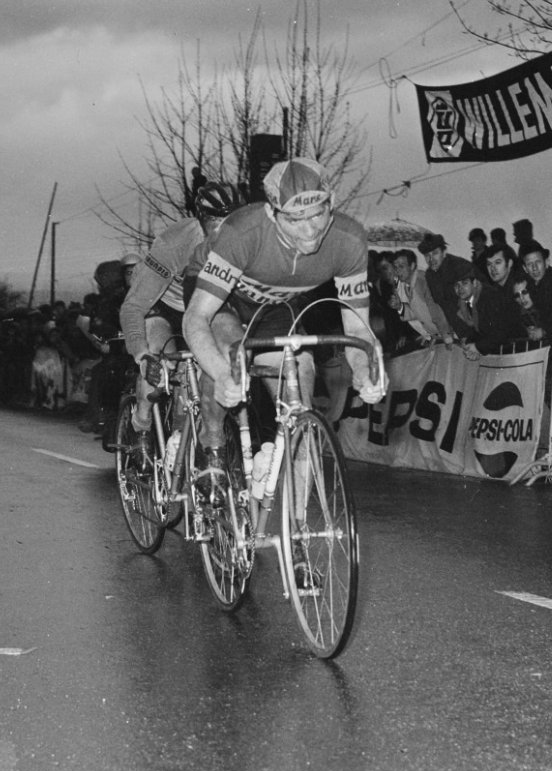
De Vlaeminck at the 1970 Amstel Gold Race

De Vlaeminck never failed a drugs test in his racing career but was treated after it for amphetamine addiction. Many stories circulate about his supposed wild behaviour after races and after his career was over. When he returned to racing, the Belgian federation would offer him a license for only a day at a time until it saw how his life would progress. De Vlaeminck subsequently refused to speak about this period of his life.

His re-establishment was complete, however, because he became the national cyclo-cross coach and led Belgium to a dominating period of international success. He always complained, however, that while cyclo-cross brought Belgium its world championship medals, it was to road racing that the bulk of the funds were given.

== Personal life ==
De Vlaeminck was the brother of Roger De Vlaeminck. His son Geert died, aged 26, of a heart attack in a cyclo-cross race while his father was watching.

In later life, De Vlaeminck had Parkinson's disease and Alzheimer's disease. He died on 4 December 2015 at the age of 70.

== Honours ==
From 2000, an annual cyclo-cross named Grand Prix Eric De Vlaeminck is organized in Heusden-Zolder,

De Vlaeminck was introduced in the UCI Cycling Hall of Fame in 2002.

== Major results ==
=== Road ===
1968
Stage 2 Tour de France
1st Circuit du Tournaisis
1st GP Union Dortmund
1969
1st Overall Tour of Belgium

1st Stage 1

1st Kampioenschap van Vlaanderen
1st Omloop der Vlaamse Ardennen
1st Stage 1 GP du Midi Libre
1st Ronde van West-Vlaanderen
1st Dwars door West-Vlaanderen
2nd La Flèche Wallonne
2nd Boucles de l'Aulne
2nd GP Roeselare
2nd Leeuwse Pijl
3rd Gent–Wevelgem
3rd Elfstedenronde
3rd Omloop der Zennevallei
3rd Renaix-Tournai-Renaix
3rd Omloop van het Waasland
1970
1st Ronde van West-Vlaanderen
1st Overall Paris–Luxembourg
1st Grand Prix of Aargau Canton
2nd Omloop der drie Provinciën
3rd Elfstedenronde
3rd La Flèche Wallonne
3rd Overall Tour of Belgium
3rd GP Flandria
1971
1st GP Flandria
1st Prologue Tour of Luxembourg
1st De Panne II
2nd Prix de St. Amands
1972
2nd Grote Prijs Marcel Kint
1977
7th Overall Tour d'Indre-et-Loire

1st Points classification
1st Stage 2

3rd E3 Harelbeke

=== Cyclo-cross ===
1963
2nd Cyclo-cross Zonhoven
2nd Druivencross Overijse
1964
3rd Jaarmarktcross Niel
3rd Druivencross Overijse
1965
1st Jaarmarktcross Niel
1st Druivencross Overijse
1st Grand Prix du Nouvel-An
1966
1st World cyclo-cross championship
1st National cyclo-cross championships
1st Jaarmarktcross Niel
1st Noordzeecross Middelkerke
1st Druivencross Overijse
1967
1st Jaarmarktcross Niel
1st Druivencross Overijse
1st Cyclocross Vossem
1968
1st World cyclo-cross championship
1st National cyclo-cross championships
1st Jaarmarktcross Niel
1st Druivencross Overijse
1st Cyclocross Vossem
1st Cyclocross Asse
1st Cyclocross Berlin
1st Cyclocross Eeklo
1st Cyclocross Fribourg
1st Cyclocross Gelsenkirchen
1st Cyclocross Hannover
1st Cyclocross Rieux
1st Cyclocross Tervuren
1st Cyclocross Wetteren
1969
1st World cyclo-cross championship
1st Noordzeecross Middelkerke
1st Flemish championship cyclo racing
1st Cyclocross Binningen
1st Cyclocross Erembodegem
1st Cyclocross Lucerne
1st Cyclocross Mannheim
1st Cyclocross Stuttgart
1st Cyclocross Vaprio d'Agogna
1st Cyclocross Westerburg
2nd Druivencross Overijse
2nd Cyclocross Vossem
1970
1st World cyclo-cross championship
1st Duinencross Koksijde
1st Noordzeecross Middelkerke
1st Provincial Championship Cyclocross Waasmunster
1st Cyclophile Aigle
1st Novate Milanese
1st Cyclocross Pieterlen
1st Cyclocross Estavayer
1st Cyclocross Heusden
1st Cyclocross Otegem
1971
1st World cyclo-cross championship
1st National cyclo-cross championships
1st Duinencross Koksijde
1st Noordzeecross Middelkerke
1st Druivencross Overijse
1st Cyclophile Aigle
1972
1st World cyclo-cross championship
1st National cyclo-cross championships
1st Druivencross Overijse
1st Novate Milanese
1st Cyclocross Zürich
1973
1st World cyclo-cross championship
1st Noordzeecross Middelkerke
1st Cyclocross Valladolid
3rd Druivencross Overijse
1975
1st Noordzeecross Middelkerke
1st Cyclo-cross Championship of Hainaut
2nd National CX Championships
1976
1st Druivencross Overijse
3rd National cyclo-cross championships
1977
3rd World cyclo-cross championship
3rd National cyclo-cross championships
1978
1st Cyclo-cross Gavere
1979
1st Jaarmarktcross Niel

== See also ==
- List of doping cases in cycling
