= 1951 UCI Cyclo-cross World Championships =

Cyclo-cross championship

- Venue: Luxembourg, Luxembourg
- Date: 18 February 1951
- Coordinates: 49°49′N 6°8′E
- Cyclists participating: 27
- Events: 1

The 1951 Cyclo-cross World Championship was the second edition of the UCI Cyclo-cross World Championships.

It was held on February 18th at the Baumbusch circuit in Luxembourg City, Luxembourg, on a 3.25-kilometer course that had to be lapped six times. Riders from seven countries participated, six with four participants, and the Netherlands alone with three. The race was won by 30-year old Roger Rondeaux.

== Men's Elite ==
RANK	1951 UCI CYCLO-CROSS WORLD CHAMPIONSHIPS	TIME
Gold medal	Roger Rondeaux (FRA)	01:04:57
Silver medal	André Dufraisse (FRA)	+ 2:01
Bronze medal	Pierre Jodet (FRA)	+ 3:51
4.	Georges Meunier (FRA)	+ 4:02
5.	Max Breu (SUI)	+ 4:09
6.	Jean Kirchen (LUX)	+ 4:20
7.	Roland Fantini (SUI)	+ 4:53
8.	Roger Jacobsk (LUX)	+ 5:17
9.	Albert Meier (SUI)	+ 5:19
10.	Luigi Malabrocca (ITA)	+ 5:28
