= Rolf Wolfshohl =

German cyclist (1938–2024)

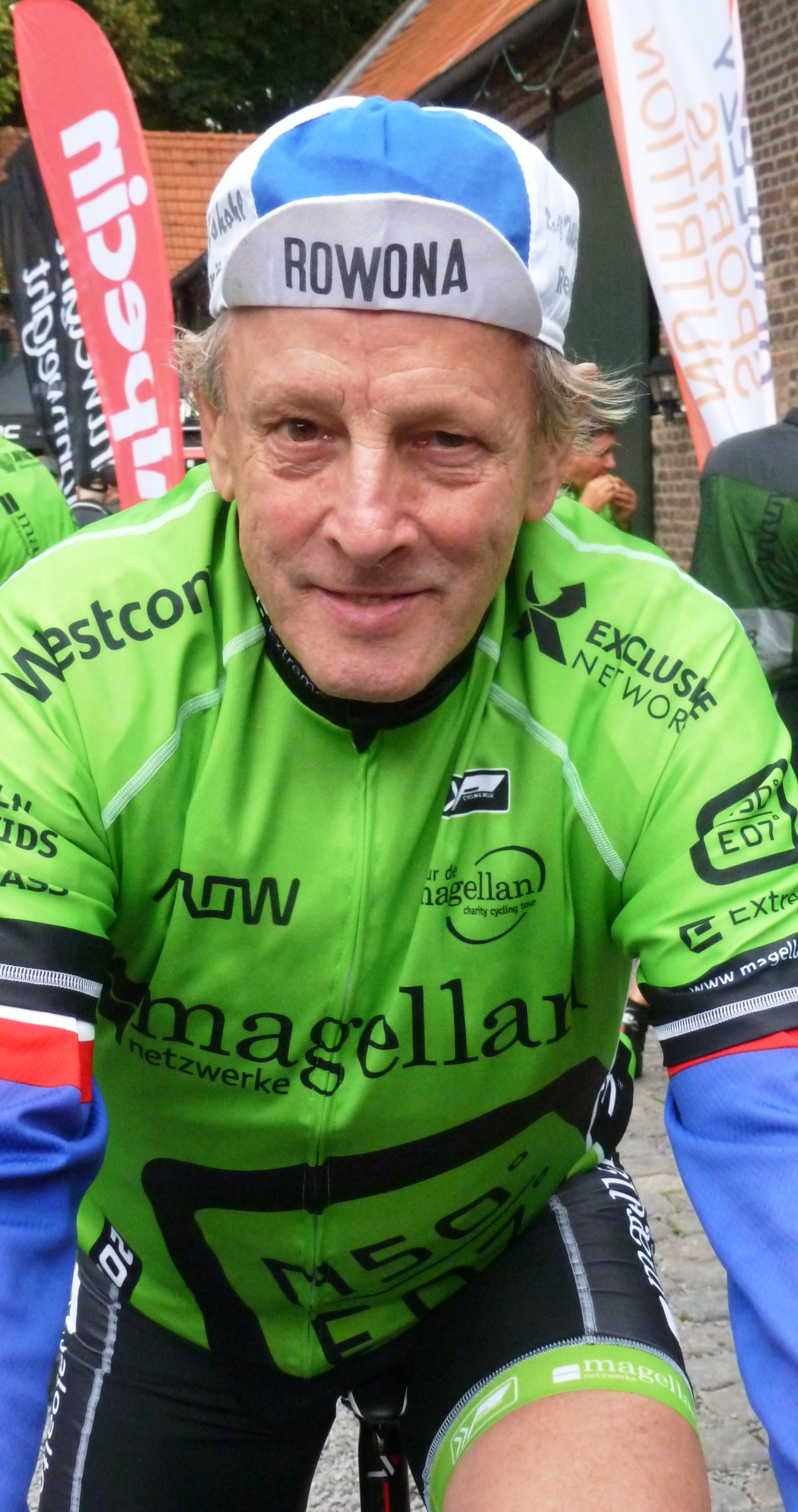
- Wolfshohl in 2014

Personal information
- Full name: Rolf Wolfshohl
- Born: 27 December 1938 Cologne, Gau Cologne-Aachen, Germany
- Died: 18 September 2024 (aged 85)

Cycling career
- Sport: Cycling
- Disciplines: Cyclo-cross; Road
- Role: Retired

Amateur team
- 1957–1959: –

Professional teams
- 1960–1962: Rapha-Gitane
- 1963–1964: Peugeot-BP
- 1965–1966: Mercier-BP-Hutchsinson
- 1967–1969: Bic
- 1970–1971: Fagor-Mercier
- 1972: Rokado
- 1973–1974: Ho-Ra
- 1975: Rokado

Major wins
- World Cyclo-cross champion (1960, 1961 & 1963); Vuelta a España 1965; West German cyclo-cross champion (1958, 1959, 1960, 1961, 1962, 1963, 1965, 1966, 1967, 1968, 1969, 1970, 1971 & 1973); West German Road Race champion (1963, 1968)
Medal record
Men's cyclo-cross
Representing Germany
World Championships
Gold medal – first place	1960 Tolosa	Elite Men's Race
Gold medal – first place	1961 Hanover	Elite Men's Race
Gold medal – first place	1963 Calais	Elite Men's Race
Silver medal – second place	1959 Geneva	Elite Men's Race
Silver medal – second place	1965 Cavaria	Elite Men's Race
Silver medal – second place	1967 Zürich	Elite Men's Race
Silver medal – second place	1969 Magstadt	Elite Men's Race
Silver medal – second place	1972 Prague	Elite Men's Race
Bronze medal – third place	1958 Limoges	Elite Men's Race
Bronze medal – third place	1966 Beasain	Elite Men's Race
Bronze medal – third place	1970 Zolder	Elite Men's Race
Bronze medal – third place	1973 London	Elite Men's Race

Rolf Wolfshohl (27 December 1938 – 18 September 2024) was a German professional road bicycle racing and cyclo-cross racing cyclist. Wolfshohl is best known in cyclo-cross for winning the then unofficial cyclo-cross world championship three times, and in road racing for winning the 1965 Vuelta a España. He won the German National Road Race in 1968.

== Biography ==
Wolfshohl started competing in cycling from 1953 at the age of 15 and won his first race in 1954. In 1956 Wolfshohl became Junior Champion of West Germany. The head of the velodrome in Dortmund, Otto Wederlin, wanted to turn Wolfshohl into a great six day track rider but Wolfshohl preferred cyclo-cross and road racing. Between 1957 and 1973, Wolfshohl took part fifteen times in the World Cyclo-Cross Championships where he won twelve medals. Three of these were gold. The first time that he reached the podium in the World championships of cyclo-cross was the bronze medal in 1958 behind the Frenchman André Dufraisse and the Italian Amerigo Severini.

In 1960 and at the age of 21, he won the rainbow jersey in Tolosa, Spain. Initially Italian Renato Longo and Swiss Arnold Hungerbühler took a small lead in the race but halfway into the race, Wolfshohl bridged to the pair and then got away to win the gold medal. A year later he prolonged his title in Hanover. The course was said to have been made or designed especially for Wolfshohl. The UCI instructed that the course be made tougher but Wolfshohl was in great form and spent most of the race alone at the front. Longo came back to Wolfshohl in the second last lap but with an acceleration Wolfshohl dropped the Italian. In 1962 Wolfshohl was sick and could not finish the World Championship race.

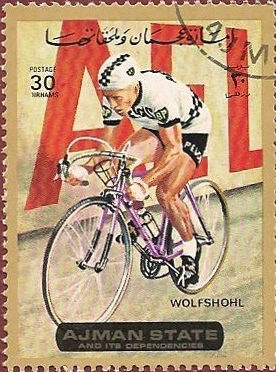
Wolfshohl on a 1972 UAE stamp

In 1963 in Calais in France, Wolfshohl won his third and final world cyclo-cross title. In the first lap, Wolfshohl created a gap and got away to win the race. In the following years Wolfshohl focused more on road racing, using cyclo-cross in the winter. He competed and won medals in the World Championships but never the gold. In 1968 Wolfshohl had to return his silver medal at the Cyclo-cross World Championships because of a positive doping test.

Wolfshohl became a professional road racer in 1960 by the Rapha-Gitane team. In 1962 he was beaten in a two-man sprint by Jef Planckaert in Liège–Bastogne–Liège. At that time Liège–Bastogne–Liège and La Flèche Wallonne were run on successive days as "Le Weekend Ardennais." Wolfshohl came seventh in La Flèche Wallonne and as a result won Le Weekend Ardennais in 1962. In the World Championships road race of that year, Wolfshohl finished fourth behind Jean Stablinski of France. In 1963 Milan–San Remo Wolfshohl and Joseph Groussard sprinted for the win. The sprint was very close and at first Wolfshohl was declared the winner but then Groussard was declared the winner.

In the 1965 Vuelta a España while riding in the Mercier cycling team of defending champion Raymond Poulidor, Wolfshohl took the leaders jersey off his team leader on the eighth stage. Wolfshohl showed himself to be the strongest in the race and kept the leader's jersey to the finish where he won with six minutes advantage over Poulidor. As a road racer, Wolfshohl also won two stages in the Tour de France, the West German road race championships and Paris–Nice. His win in Paris–Nice was by just three seconds over Ferdinand Bracke.

In the 1968 Tour de France Wolfshohl won the yellow jersey after the 16th stage. In the 18th stage, Wolfshohl crashed on a descent and had to wait for his teammate. Wolfshohl would finish the race sixth.

In total he won 140 road races and 110 cyclo-cross races. He retired in 1975 and began a bike shop. From 1995 until 2000 he was involved in the organisation of the Rund um Köln. After his career, he worked in his own company (trade with bicycles) in Köln.

Wolfshohl died on 18 September 2024, at the age of 85.

== Major results ==
1958
1st West German Cyclo-Cross championship
3rd World cyclo-cross championship
1959
1st West German Cyclo-Cross championship
2nd World cyclo-cross championship
1960
1st World cyclo-cross championship
1st West German Cyclo-Cross championship
1961
1st World cyclo-cross championship
1st West German Cyclo-Cross championship
1962
1st West German Cyclo-Cross championship
1st GP de la Bicicleta Eibarresa
1st Tour of the Basque Country
1963
1st World cyclo-cross championship
1st West German Road race championship
1st West German Cyclo-Cross championship
1st Grand Prix du Parisien
1965
1st, Overall, 1965 Vuelta a España
2nd World cyclo-cross championship
1st West German Cyclo-Cross championship
1966
1st West German Cyclo-Cross championship
3rd World cyclo-cross championship
1967
1st West German Cyclo-Cross championship
Tour de France:

Winner stage 15

2nd World cyclo-cross championship
1968
1st West German Road race championship
1st West German Cyclo-Cross championship
6th, Overall, Tour de France
1st Paris–Nice
1969
1st West German Cyclo-Cross championship
2nd World cyclo-cross championship
1970
1st West German Cyclo-Cross championship
3rd World cyclo-cross championship
Tour de France:

Winner stage 20A

1971
1st West German Cyclo-Cross championship
1972
2nd World cyclo-cross championship
1973
1st West German Cyclo-Cross championship
3rd World cyclo-cross championship
