= 1953 UCI Cyclo-cross World Championships =

Cyclo-cross championship

- Venue: Oñati, Spain
- Date: 8 March 1953
- Coordinates: 43°02′N 02°25′W
- Cyclists participating: 42
- Events: 1

The 1953 Cyclo-cross World Championship was the fourth edition of the UCI Cyclo-cross World Championships.

It was held on March 8th in Oñati, Spain. A course of just over five kilometers had to be lapped four times, bringing the total distance for this edition to almost 22 kilometers. Forty-three riders from ten countries had registered. The participants from West Germany and Saarland participated as amateurs.

Forty-two riders started. German Zeissner had fallen during the training session beforehand. For the third time, after 1950 and 1951, three French riders stood on the podium. Roger Rondeaux won his third consecutive title.

== Men's Elite ==
RANK	1953 UCI CYCLO-CROSS WORLD CHAMPIONSHIPS	TIME
Gold medal	Roger Rondeaux (FRA)	01:00:22
Silver medal	Gilbert Bauvin (FRA)	+ 0:54
Bronze medal	André Dufraisse (FRA)	+ 2:00
4.	Hans Bieri (SUI)	+ 2:45
5.	Joaquin Filba (ESP)	+ 2:55
6.	Pierre Jodet (FRA)	+ 3:02
7.	Juan Aguirrezabal (ESP)	+ 3:08
8.	Alex Close (BEL)	+ 3:35
9.	Johny Goedert (LUX)	+ 4:05
10.	Roger De Clercq (BEL)	+ 4:45
