= Peter Frischknecht =

Swiss cyclo-cross cyclist (born 1946)

Personal information
- Born: 12 March 1946 (age 80) Uster, Switzerland

Cycling career
- Sport: Cycling
- Current team: Retired
- Discipline: Cyclo-cross
- Role: Rider
Medal record
Representing Switzerland
Men's cyclo-cross
World Championships
Silver medal – second place	1976 Chazay	Elite race
Silver medal – second place	1977 Hanover	Elite race
Silver medal – second place	1978 Amorebieta-Etxano	Elite race
Bronze medal – third place	1974 Bera	Elite race
Bronze medal – third place	1975 Melchnau	Elite race

Peter Frischknecht (born 12 March 1946) is a Swiss former professional cyclo-cross cyclist. He notably won the Swiss National Cyclo-cross Championships in 1974 and 1978 in addition to 11 second-place finishes. He also won a silver medal at the UCI World Championships in 1976, 1977 and 1978. He is the father of Thomas Frischknecht and the grandfather of Andri Frischknecht, both also professional cyclists.
