= 1950 UCI Cyclo-cross World Championships =

Cyclo-cross championship

- Venue: Paris, France
- Date: 4 March 1950
- Coordinates: 48°51′N 2°21′E
- Cyclists participating: 23
- Events: 1

The 1950 Cyclo-cross World Championship was the inaugural edition of the UCI Cyclo-cross World Championships.

It was held on Saturday, March 4, 1950, in the suburbs of Paris, on a 23,25 kilometer course on the Gravelle Plateau. Riders from six countries, each with four participants, participated. The race was won by 29-year old Jean Robic.

== Men's Elite ==
RANK	1950 UCI CYCLO-CROSS WORLD CHAMPIONSHIPS	TIME
Gold medal	Jean Robic (FRA)	00:51:44
Silver medal	Roger Rondeaux (FRA)	00:51:44
Bronze medal	Pierre Jodet (FRA)	+ 1:58
4.	Georges Meunier (FRA)	+ 2:47
5.	Nello Sforacchi (ITA)	+ 2:47
6.	Martin Metzger (SUI)	+ 2:47
7.	Sergio Toigo (ITA)	+ 2:47
8.	Georges Vandermeirsch (BEL)	+ 2:47
9.	Roland Fantini (SUI)	+ 2:47
10.	Eugene Jacobs (BEL)	+ 3:22
