= André Wilhelm =

French cyclist

Personal information
- Full name: André Wilhelm
- Born: 7 February 1943 (age 83) Gosselming, France

Cycling career
- Sport: Cycling
- Role: Rider

André Wilhelm (born 7 February 1943) is a French former racing cyclist. His sporting career began with VC Metz. He finished in last place in the 1969 Tour de France.
