= Emanuel Plattner =

Swiss cyclist

Personal information
- Born: 29 May 1935 (age 91)

Cycling career
- Sport: Cycling
- Role: Rider

Emanuel Plattner (born 29 May 1935) is a Swiss racing cyclist. He rode in the 1959 Tour de France.
