= Hermann Gretener =

Swiss cyclo-cross cyclist (1942–2022)

Personal information
- Born: 8 September 1943 Bertschikon bei Attikon, Switzerland
- Died: 27 March 2022 (aged 78)

Cycling career
- Sport: Cycling
- Current team: Retired
- Disciplines: Cyclo-cross; Road
- Role: Rider

Professional teams
- 1964–1965: Gritzner–Veith
- 1966: Savro
- 1967–1969: Zimba–Automatic
- 1970: G.B.C.–Zimba
- 1971–1972: Bio Strath–Mondia
- 1973–1975: Möbel Märki-Bonanza
- 1976: Gartenbau–Brandli
- 1978: Zodiac-Gios
Medal record
Representing Switzerland
Men's cyclo-cross
World Championships
Silver medal – second place	1966 Beasain	Elite race
Silver medal – second place	1968 Luxembourg	Elite race
Bronze medal – third place	1967 Zurich	Elite race
Bronze medal – third place	1972 Prague	Elite race

Hermann Gretener (8 September 1942 – 27 March 2022) was a Swiss professional cyclo-cross cyclist. He notably won the Swiss National Cyclo-cross Championships six times: in 1966, 1969, 1971, 1972, 1973 and 1975 in addition to four more podium finishes. He also won a silver medal at the UCI World Championships in 1966 and 1968 and a bronze medal in 1967 and 1972.
