= Amerigo Severini =

Italian cyclist (1931–2020)

Personal information
- Born: 11 May 1931 Barbara, Italy
- Died: 1 April 2020 (aged 88) Arcevia, Italy

Cycling career
- Sport: Cycling

Professional teams
- 1956–1957: Augustea
- 1958–1959: Giambellino
- 1960: Curti
- 1961: G.B.C.
- 1962: Gramaglia
- 1963–1967: G.B.C.–Gramaglia

Amerigo Severini (11 May 1931 – 1 April 2020) was an Italian cyclist. He competed in cyclo-cross, and won three national championships and medalled four times at the World Championships.

== Major results ==
=== Cyclo-cross ===
1954–1955
2nd National Championships
3rd World Championships
1955–1956
1st National Championships
1957–1958
2nd World Championships
1958–1959
3rd World Championships
1959–1960
2nd National Championships
1960–1961
1st National Championships
6th World Championships
1962–1963
1st National Championships
4th World Championships
1963–1964
2nd National Championships
6th World Championships
1964–1965
2nd National Championships
3rd World Championships
1965–1966
2nd National Championships
6th World Championships

=== Road ===
1951
1st Bologna–Passo della Raticosa
