= UCI Cyclo-cross World Championships =

World championships for cyclo-cross, organized by the UCI

The UCI Cyclo-cross World Championships are the world championships for cyclo-cross organised by the Union Cycliste Internationale (UCI). Starting in 2022, seven events are organized each year – men's elite, women's elite, men's under 23, women's under 23, men's under 18 (Men's Juniors), women's under 18 (Women's Juniors) and a Mixed team relay event. In recent years, the mixed relay race is held on a Friday and the rest of the races on Saturday and Sunday after that.

The UCI awards a gold medal and a rainbow jersey to the winner. Silver and bronze medals are awarded to the second and third place contestants. World champions wear their rainbow jersey until the following year's championship, but they may wear it only in the type of event in which they won it.

== History ==
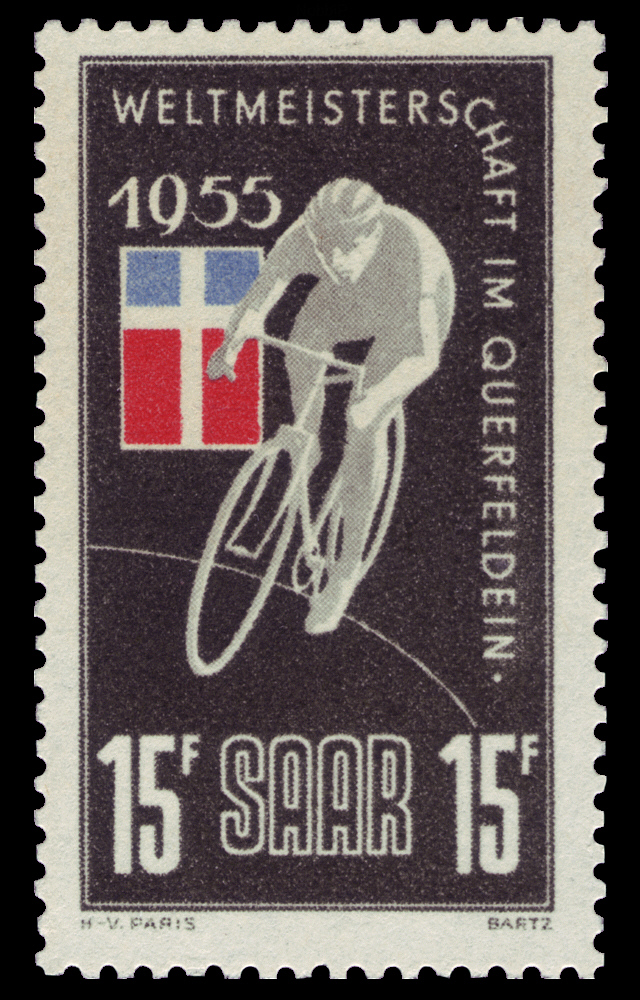
Stamp of the event in 1955 (Saarland)

First held in 1950 it replaced the Critérium International de Cyclo-cross (French for International Cyclo-cross Criterium) which, as the first international cyclo-cross race, was considered the unofficial world championship. It has since been held annually and is traditionally disputed at the end of January or the beginning of February. At first there was only the event for elite men. Events for junior and under 23 men were added in 1979 and 1996 respectively; women's events were added for the elites and under 23s in 2000 and 2016 respectively. Beyond these, there also was an event for amateurs from 1967 till 1993.

Cyclo-cross being mostly centred in Europe has made it take quite a while for the world championships to be held in another continent. This changed with the 2013 edition which took place in Louisville, Kentucky, United States.

== Current champions ==
As of 2026 UCI Cyclo-cross World Championships

Event	Rider	Country
Men's elite	Mathieu van der Poel	Netherlands
Women's elite	Lucinda Brand	Netherlands
Men's under 23	Aaron Dockx	Belgium
Women's under 23	Leonie Bentveld	Netherlands
Men's junior	Delanio Heeren	Netherlands
Women's junior	Barbora Bukovská	Czech Republic
Mixed team relay	Netherlands	

== Championships ==
Year	Country	City
1950	France	Paris
1951	Luxembourg	Luxembourg
1952	Switzerland	Geneva
1953	Spain	Oñate
1954	Italy	Crenna
1955	Saar	Saarbrücken
1956	Luxembourg	Luxembourg
1957	Belgium	Edelare
1958	France	Limoges
1959	Switzerland	Geneva
1960	Spain	Tolosa
1961	West Germany	Hanover
1962	Luxembourg	Esch-sur-Alzette
1963	France	Calais
1964	Belgium	Overboelare
1965	Italy	Cavaria
1966	Spain	Beasain
1967	Switzerland	Zürich
1968	Luxembourg	Luxembourg
1969	West Germany	Magstadt
1970	Belgium	Zolder
1971	Netherlands	Apeldoorn
1972	Czechoslovakia	Prague
1973	United Kingdom	London
1974	Spain	Bera
1975	Switzerland	Melchnau
1976	France	Chazay-d'Azergues
1977	West Germany	Hanover
1978	Spain	Amorebieta-Etxano
1979	Italy	Saccolongo
1980	Switzerland	Wetzikon

Year	Country	City
1981	Spain	Tolosa
1982	France	Lanarvily
1983	United Kingdom	Birmingham
1984	Netherlands	Oss
1985	West Germany	Munich
1986	Belgium	Lembeek
1987	Czechoslovakia	Mladá Boleslav
1988	Switzerland	Hägendorf
1989	France	Pontchâteau
1990	Spain	Getxo
1991	Netherlands	Gieten
1992	United Kingdom	Leeds
1993	Italy	Corva
1994	Belgium	Koksijde
1995	Switzerland	Eschenbach
1996	France	Montreuil
1997	Germany	Munich
1998	Denmark	Middelfart
1999	Slovakia	Poprad
2000	Netherlands	Sint-Michielsgestel
2001	Czech Republic	Tábor
2002	Belgium	Zolder
2003	Italy	Monopoli
2004	France	Pontchâteau
2005	Germany	Sankt Wendel
2006	Netherlands	Zeddam
2007	Belgium	Hooglede-Gits
2008	Italy	Treviso
2009	Netherlands	Hoogerheide
2010	Czech Republic	Tábor

Year	Country	City
2011	Germany	Sankt Wendel
2012	Belgium	Koksijde
2013	United States	Louisville
2014	Netherlands	Hoogerheide
2015	Czech Republic	Tábor
2016	Belgium	Zolder
2017	Luxembourg	Belvaux
2018	Netherlands	Valkenburg
2019	Denmark	Bogense
2020	Switzerland	Dübendorf
2021	Belgium	Ostend
2022	United States	Fayetteville
2023	Netherlands	Hoogerheide
2024	Czech Republic	Tábor
2025	France	Liévin
2026	Netherlands	Hulst
2027	Belgium	Ostend
2028	Netherlands	Hoogerheide
2029	Italy	Treviso
2030	Belgium	Namur
2031	Spain	Benidorm
2032	Denmark	Fyn

== Results ==
- Women's elite race
- Men's elite race
- Women's under-23 race
- Men's under-23 race
- Junior women's race
- Junior men's race
- Mixed team relay

== See also ==
- Belgium at the UCI Cyclo-cross World Championships
- (Europe) European Cyclo-cross Championships
