= Robert Vermeire =

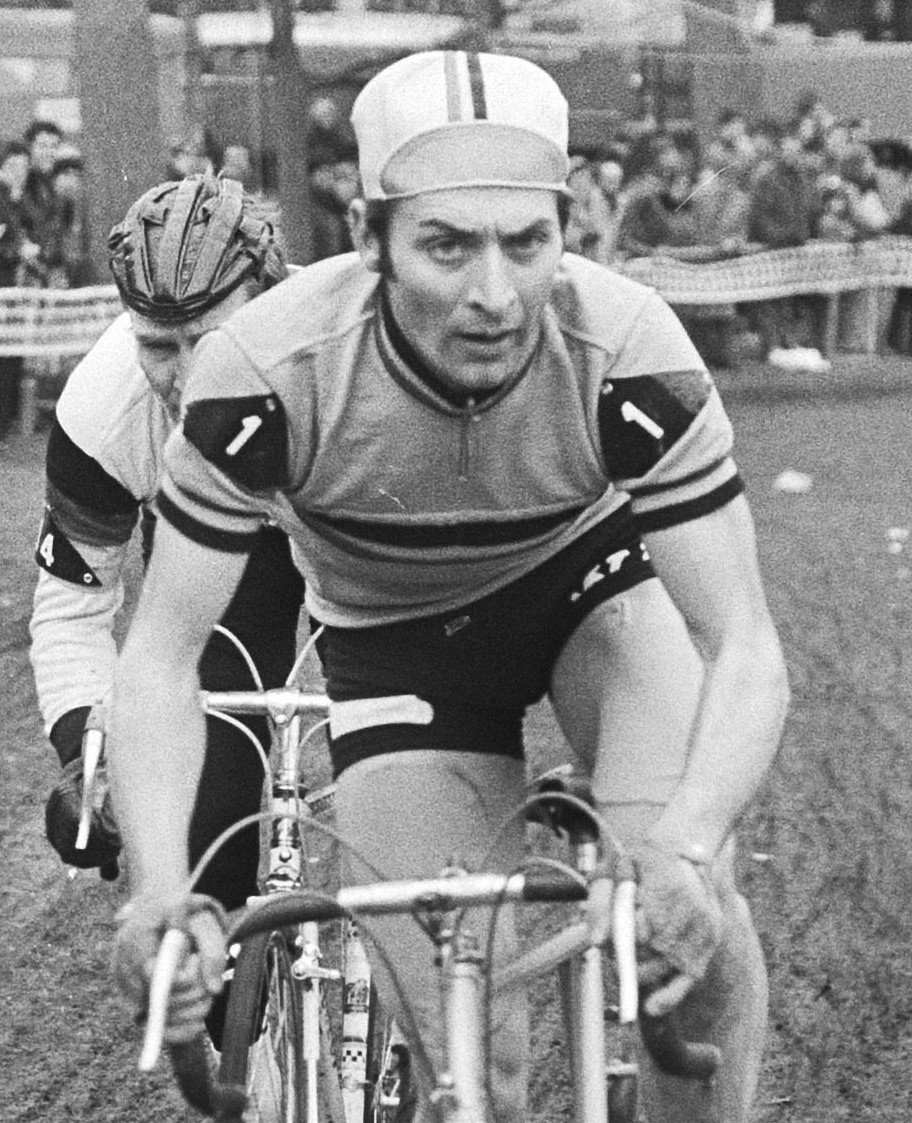
- Vermeire at the 1971 UCI Cyclo-cross World Championships

Personal information
- Born: 2 November 1944 (age 81) Beernem, Belgium

Cycling career
- Sport: Cycling
- Discipline: Cyclo-cross
- Role: Rider

Professional teams
- 1979–1980: Marc Zeep Savon–Superia
- 1981: Marc–Koffieboerke–Merckx
- 1982–1986: Marc–Ecoturbo
Medal record
Representing Belgium
World Championships
Bronze medal – third place	1979 Saccolongo	Elite race

Robert Vermeire (born 2 November 1944) is a Belgian former cyclo-cross cyclist. He notably won the UCI Amateur Cyclo-cross World Championships five times: in 1970, 1971, 1974, 1975 and 1977. He also won a bronze medal in the elite race at the 1979 UCI Cyclo-cross World Championships.

== Major results ==
1965
3rd National Amateur Championships
1967
1st Steinmaur
1969
2nd National Amateur Championships
3rd UCI Amateur World Championships
1970
1st UCI Amateur World Championships
1st National Amateur Championships
1st Noordzeecross
1971
1st UCI Amateur World Championships
1st National Amateur Championships
1972
1st National Amateur Championships
1st Jaarmarktcross Niel
1973
1st National Amateur Championships
1st Otegem
2nd UCI Amateur World Championships
1974
1st UCI Amateur World Championships
2nd National Amateur Championships
1975
1st UCI Amateur World Championships
1st National Amateur Championships
1st Jaarmarktcross Niel
1976
1st National Amateur Championships
1st Jaarmarktcross Niel
2nd UCI Amateur World Championships
1977
1st UCI Amateur World Championships
1st National Amateur Championships
1st Diegem
1978
1st National Amateur Championships
1st Jaarmarktcross Niel
1st Duinencross Koksijde
1979
1st Druivencross
1st Jaarmarktcross Niel
1st Duinencross Koksijde
3rd UCI World Championships
3rd National Championships
1980
2nd National Championships
8th UCI World Championships
1981
2nd National Championships
6th UCI World Championships
1982
2nd National Championships
4th UCI World Championships
1983
2nd National Championships
6th UCI World Championships
1984
2nd National Championships
4th UCI World Championships
1985
3rd National Championships
10th UCI World Championships
