= 1982 UCI Cyclo-cross World Championships =

Cyclo-cross championship

- Venue: Lanarvily, France
- Date: 20–21 February 1982
- Coordinates: 48°33′11″N 4°23′12″W
- Cyclists participating: 21 (Elite); 43 (Amateurs), 39 (Juniors)
- Events: 2

The 1982 UCI Cyclo-cross World Championships were held in Lanarvily, France on 20 and 21 February 1982. It was the 33rd edition of the UCI Cyclo-cross World Championships.

== Men's Elite results ==
RANK	NAME	TIME
Gold medal	Roland Liboton (BEL)	1:06:36
Silver medal	Albert Zweifel (SUI)	+ 0:02
Bronze medal	Hennie Stamsnijder (NED)	+ 0:43
4.	Robert Vermeire (BEL)	+ 1:19
5.	Reimund Dietzen (BRD)	+ 1:56
6.	Johan Ghyllebert (BEL)	+ 2:13
7.	Gilles Blaser (SUI)	+ 2:22
8.	Dieter Uebing (BRD)	+ 2:49
9.	Reinier Groenendaal (NED)	+ 3:13
10.	Klaus-Peter Thaler (BRD)	+ 3:30

== Men's Amateurs results ==
RANK	NAME	TIME
Gold medal	Miloš Fišera (CZE)	52:38
Silver medal	Radomír Šimůnek (CZE)	+ 0:00
Bronze medal	Ueli Müller (SUI)	+ 0:00
4.	Hans Boom (NED)	+ 0:00
5.	Vito Di Tano (ITA)	+ 0:00
6.	Ivan Messelis (BEL)	+ 0:00
7.	Jean-Yves Plaisance (FRA)	+ 0:06
8.	Petr Klouček (CZE)	+ 0:06
9.	Fritz Saladin (SUI)	+ 0:10
10.	Herman Snoeijink (NED)	+ 0:12

== Men's Juniors results ==
RANK	NAME	TIME
Gold medal	Beat Schumacher (SUI)	43:06
Silver medal	Erwin Nijboer (NED)	+ 0:04
Bronze medal	Radovan Fořt (CZE)	+ 1:02
4.	Christopher Young (GBR)	+ 1:08
5.	Peter Hric (CZE)	+ 1:30
6.	Maurizio Vandelli (ITA)	+ 1:54
7.	Timothy Gould (GBR)	+ 1:57
8.	Klaus-Dieter Pöhlmann (BRD)	+ 2:12
9.	Karsten Migels (BRD)	+ 2:17
10.	Angelo Tosi (ITA)	+ 2:23
