= 1983 UCI Cyclo-cross World Championships =

Cyclo-cross championship

- Program booklet

- Location within England
- Venue: Birmingham, United Kingdom
- Date: 18–20 February 1983
- Coordinates: 52°28′48″N 1°54′9″W
- Cyclists participating: 28 (Elite); 54 (Amateurs), 46 (Juniors)
- Events: 3

The 1983 UCI Cyclo-cross World Championships were held in Birmingham, United Kingdom on 19 and 20 February 1983. It was the 34th edition of the UCI Cyclo-cross World Championships.

== Men's Elite results ==
RANK	NAME	TIME
Gold medal	Roland Liboton (BEL)	53:17
Silver medal	Albert Zweifel (SUI)	+ 0:09
Bronze medal	Klaus-Peter Thaler (BRD)	+ 0:10
4.	Reinier Groenendaal (NED)	+ 1:06
5.	Hennie Stamsnijder (NED)	+ 1:06
6.	Robert Vermeire (BEL)	+ 1:07
7.	Patrice Thévenard (FRA)	+ 1:28
8.	Johan Ghyllebert (BEL)	+ 2:02
9.	Peter Frischknecht (SUI)	+ 2:21
10.	Jan Teugels (BEL)	+ 2:23

== Men's Amateurs results ==
RANK	NAME	TIME
Gold medal	Radomír Šimůnek (CZE)	47:11
Silver medal	Werner Van Der Fraenen (BEL)	+ 0:00
Bronze medal	Petr Klouček (CZE)	+ 0:02
4.	Andrzej Mąkowski (POL)	+ 0:14
5.	Ludo De Rey (BEL)	+ 0:20
6.	Miloš Fišera (CZE)	+ 0:25
7.	Alain Daniel (FRA)	+ 0:27
8.	František Klouček (CZE)	+ 0:31
9.	Ivan Messelis (BEL)	+ 0:40
10.	Herman Snoeijink (NED)	+ 0:51

== Men's Juniors results ==
RANK	NAME	TIME
Gold medal	Roman Kreuziger (CZE)	39:35
Silver medal	Martin Hendriks (NED)	+ 0:06
Bronze medal	Peter Hric (CZE)	+ 0:11
4.	Radovan Fořt (CZE)	+ 0:13
5.	John van Gessel (NED)	+ 0:19
6.	Josef Faller (BRD)	+ 0:35
7.	Ondrej Glajza (CZE)	+ 0:55
8.	Thierry Valette (FRA)	+ 0:57
9.	Peter Müller (SUI)	+ 1:07
10.	Henri Schnadt (LUX)	+ 1:10
