= 1980 UCI Cyclo-cross World Championships =

Cyclo-cross championship

- Program booklet

- Venue: Wetzikon, Switzerland
- Date: 26–27 January 1980
- Coordinates: 47°19′N 8°48′E
- Cyclists participating: 28 (Elite); 43 (Amateurs), 39 (Juniors)
- Events: 3

The 1980 UCI Cyclo-cross World Championships were held in Wetzikon, Switzerland on 26 and 27 January 1980. It was the 31st edition of the UCI Cyclo-cross World Championships.

== Men's Elite results ==
RANK	NAME	TIME
Gold medal	Roland Liboton (BEL)	1:01:17
Silver medal	Klaus-Peter Thaler (BRD)	+ 0:19
Bronze medal	Hennie Stamsnijder (NED)	+ 0:19
4.	Albert Zweifel (SUI)	+ 0:22
5.	Peter Frischknecht (SUI)	+ 1:25
6.	Erwin Lienhard (SUI)	+ 2:20
7.	André Geirlandt (BEL)	+ 3:04
8.	Robert Vermeire (BEL)	+ 3:43
9.	Alex Gérardin (FRA)	+ 4:15
10.	Gilles Blaser (SUI)	+ 4:36

== Men's Amateurs results ==
RANK	NAME	TIME
Gold medal	Fritz Saladin (SUI)	1:00:09
Silver medal	Andrzej Mąkowski (POL)	+ 0:21
Bronze medal	Grzegorz Jaroszewski (POL)	+ 0:27
4.	Carlo Lafranchi (SUI)	+ 0:32
5.	Dieter Uebing (BRD)	+ 0:39
6.	Franco Vagneur (ITA)	+ 1:32
7.	Ueli Müller (SUI)	+ 1:41
8.	Ivan Messelis (BEL)	+ 1:56
9.	Vito Di Tano (ITA)	+ 2:06
10.	Paul De Brauwer (BEL)	+ 2:11

== Men's Juniors results ==
RANK	NAME	TIME
Gold medal	Radomír Šimůnek (CZE)	42:48
Silver medal	Jokin Mujika (ESP)	+ 0:06
Bronze medal	Bernard Woodtli (SUI)	+ 0:16
4.	Rigobert Matt (BRD)	+ 0:18
5.	Hansjörg Winkler (SUI)	+ 0:18
6.	Eric Vanderaerden (BEL)	+ 0:32
7.	Heinz Matschke (BRD)	+ 0:46
8.	Tadeusz Krzyślak (POL)	+ 0:53
9.	Rudi Flierli (BRD)	+ 1:08
10.	Ernst Weidmann (SUI)	+ 1:34
