= 1985 UCI Cyclo-cross World Championships =

Cyclo-cross championship

- Venue: Munich, West Germany
- Date: 16–17 February 1985
- Coordinates: 48°08′15″N 11°34′30″E
- Cyclists participating: 27 (Elite); 47 (Amateurs), 42 (Juniors)
- Events: 3

The 1985 UCI Cyclo-cross World Championships were held in Munich, West Germany on 16 and 17 February 1985. It was the 36th edition of the UCI Cyclo-cross World Championships.

== Men's Elite results ==
RANK	NAME	TIME
Gold medal	Klaus-Peter Thaler (BRD)	1:12:37
Silver medal	Adrie van der Poel (NED)	+ 0:02
Bronze medal	Claude Michely (LUX)	+ 0:04
4.	Reinier Groenendaal (NED)	+ 0:20
5.	Marcel Russenberger (SUI)	+ 0:24
6.	Henk Baars (NED)	+ 1:28
7.	Martial Gayant (FRA)	+ 2:06
8.	Ottavio Paccagnella (ITA)	+ 2:07
9.	Bernard Woodtli (SUI)	+ 2:08
10.	Roland Liboton (BEL)	+ 2:24

== Men's Amateurs results ==
RANK	NAME	TIME
Gold medal	Mike Kluge (BRD)	1:04:25
Silver medal	Beat Schumacher (SUI)	+ 0:26
Bronze medal	Bruno D’Arsié (SUI)	+ 0:40
4.	Petr Klouček (CZE)	+ 0:44
5.	Frank van Bakel (NED)	+ 0:55
6.	Peter Hric (CZE)	+ 1:11
7.	Sandro Bono (ITA)	+ 1:25
8.	Grzegorz Jaroszewski (POL)	+ 1:28
9.	Henrik Djernis (DEN)	+ 1:39
10.	Martin Hendriks (NED)	+ 1:50

== Men's Juniors results ==
RANK	NAME	TIME
Gold medal	Beat Wabel (SUI)	57:30
Silver medal	Jürgen Sprich (BRD)	+ 0:18
Bronze medal	Wim de Vos (NED)	+ 0:39
4.	Zdeněk Douša (CZE)	+ 0:49
5.	Robert Bondaryk (POL)	+ 0:52
6.	Urs Güller (SUI)	+ 1:06
7.	Kai-Uwe Richter (BRD)	+ 1:08
8.	Martin Raufer (CZE)	+ 1:25
9.	Marcel Gerritsen (NED)	+ 1:36
10.	Chris David (BEL)	+ 1:39
