= 1981 UCI Cyclo-cross World Championships =

Cyclo-cross championship

- Venue: Tolosa, Spain
- Date: 21–22 February 1981
- Coordinates: 43°8′N 2°5′W
- Cyclists participating: 27 (Elite); 47 (Amateurs), 39 (Juniors)
- Events: 3

The 1981 UCI Cyclo-cross World Championships were held in Tolosa, Spain on 21 and 22 February 1981. It was the 32nd edition of the UCI Cyclo-cross World Championships.

== Men's Elite results ==
RANK	NAME	TIME
Gold medal	Hennie Stamsnijder (NED)	1:01:53
Silver medal	Roland Liboton (BEL)	+ 0:32
Bronze medal	Albert Zweifel (SUI)	+ 0:32
4.	Peter Frischknecht (SUI)	+ 0:34
5.	Klaus-Peter Thaler (BRD)	+ 1:48
6.	Robert Vermeire (BEL)	+ 2:23
7.	Erwin Lienhard (SUI)	+ 2:38
8.	Gilles Blaser (SUI)	+ 3:11
9.	Cees van der Wereld (NED)	+ 3:28
10.	Dieter Uebing (BRD)	+ 4:40

== Men's Amateurs results ==
RANK	NAME	TIME
Gold medal	Miloš Fišera (CZE)	53:34
Silver medal	Grzegorz Jaroszewski (POL)	+ 0:00
Bronze medal	Paul De Brauwer (BEL)	+ 0:00
4.	Reimund Dietzen (BRD)	+ 0:20
5.	Vito Di Tano (ITA)	+ 0:26
6.	Andrzej Mąkowski (POL)	+ 0:51
7.	Ueli Müller (SUI)	+ 1:00
8.	Sepp Kuriger (SUI)	+ 1:00
9.	Franco Vagneur (ITA)	+ 1:11
10.	Jean-Yves Plaisance (FRA)	+ 1:11

== Men's Juniors results ==
RANK	NAME	TIME
Gold medal	Rigobert Matt (BRD)	41:20
Silver medal	Miloslav Kvasnička (CZE)	+ 0:30
Bronze medal	Konrad Morf (SUI)	+ 0:54
4.	Jan Szajwaj (POL)	+ 1:29
5.	Hans-Rüdi Büchi (SUI)	+ 1:34
6.	Jaromír Fišer (CZE)	+ 1:56
7.	Andreas Büsser (SUI)	+ 2:00
8.	Hanspeter Kürzi (SUI)	+ 2:12
9.	Angelo Tosi (ITA)	+ 2:16
10.	Erwin Nijboer (NED)	+ 2:22
