= Cyclo-cross Superprestige =

Cyclo-cross competition

Superprestige
- 2025–26 Cyclo-cross Superprestige

Race details
- Date: October–February
- Region: Belgium
- Discipline: Cyclo-cross
- Type: Series
- Organiser: Flanders Classics
- Web site: www.superprestigecyclocross.be

History (men)
- First edition: 1983
- Editions: 44 (as of season 2025–26)
- First winner: Hennie Stamsnijder (NED)
- Most wins: Sven Nys (BEL) (13 wins)
- Most recent: Niels Vandeputte (BEL)

History (women)
- First edition: 2015
- Editions: 11 (as of season 2025–26)
- First winner: Sanne Cant (BEL)
- Most wins: Sanne Cant (BEL) (4 wins)
- Most recent: Aniek van Alphen (NED)

The Cyclo-cross Superprestige is a season-long cyclo-cross competition, consisting of around 8 rounds throughout the season in Belgium and the Netherlands. It is one of three major season-long competitions, alongside the UCI Cyclo-cross World Cup and the Cyclo-cross Trophy. A season consist of several races in the categories Elite Men and Elite Women. Riders can win points in each race and at the end of the season the rider with the highest point tally in each category is considered the winner. Until 2020 Superprestige had separate classification for Under 23 Men, Under-23 Women and Junior Men.

The first Superprestige took place in 1982–1983 and was won by Hennie Stamsnijder of the Netherlands. The Superprestige is organised for trade teams, not national teams. Since 2018 Superprestige has been organised by Flanders Classics.

Only two riders have won all eight Superprestige races in one season, Sven Nys in 2006–07 and Mathieu van der Poel in 2018–19. The 2022–2023 season only contains seven races due to the race in Gieten being removed from the calendar.

== Points ==
During each race the Superprestige classification points are awarded based on the following table.

Allocation of Superprestige points
Place	1	2	3	4	5	6	7	8	9	10	11	12	13	14	15
Points	15	14	13	12	11	10	9	8	7	6	5	4	3	2	1

== Winners ==
=== Elite Men ===
Year	First	Second	Third
1982–83	(Netherlands) Hennie Stamsnijder	(Belgium) Johan Ghyllebert	(Belgium) Paul De Brauwer
1983–84	(Netherlands) Hennie Stamsnijder	(Netherlands) Rein Groenendaal	(Switzerland) Albert Zweifel
1984–85	(Belgium) Roland Liboton	(Netherlands) Hennie Stamsnijder	(Netherlands) Rein Groenendaal
1985–86	(Belgium) Roland Liboton	(Netherlands) Hennie Stamsnijder	(Belgium) Paul De Brauwer
1986–87	(Netherlands) Hennie Stamsnijder	(Netherlands) Frank van Bakel	(Netherlands) Martin Hendriks
1987–88	(Belgium) Roland Liboton	(Netherlands) Hennie Stamsnijder	(Belgium) Paul De Brauwer
1988–89	(Netherlands) Hennie Stamsnijder	(Belgium) Paul De Brauwer	(Netherlands) Henk Baars
1989–90	(Belgium) Danny De Bie	(Belgium) Paul De Brauwer	(Netherlands) Henk Baars
1990–91	(Czech Republic) Radomír Šimůnek	(Belgium) Danny De Bie	(Belgium) Kurt De Roose
1991–92	(Czech Republic) Radomír Šimůnek	(Belgium) Danny De Bie	(Netherlands) Frank van Bakel
1992–93	(Italy) Daniele Pontoni	(Switzerland) Thomas Frischknecht	(Belgium) Danny De Bie
1993–94	(Italy) Daniele Pontoni	(Belgium) Marc Janssens	(Switzerland) Thomas Frischknecht
1994–95	(Czech Republic) Radomír Šimůnek	(Netherlands) Richard Groenendaal	(Netherlands) Adrie van der Poel
1995–96	(Italy) Luca Bramati	(Netherlands) Richard Groenendaal	(Netherlands) Adrie van der Poel
1996–97	(Netherlands) Adrie van der Poel	(Belgium) Mario De Clercq	(Netherlands) Richard Groenendaal
1997–98	(Netherlands) Richard Groenendaal	(Netherlands) Adrie van der Poel	(Belgium) Mario De Clercq
1998–99	(Belgium) Sven Nys	(Belgium) Bart Wellens	(Netherlands) Adrie van der Poel
1999–00	(Belgium) Sven Nys	(Netherlands) Richard Groenendaal	(Netherlands) Adrie van der Poel
2000–01	(Netherlands) Richard Groenendaal	(Belgium) Bart Wellens	(Belgium) Erwin Vervecken
2001–02	(Belgium) Sven Nys	(Belgium) Erwin Vervecken	(Belgium) Bart Wellens
2002–03	(Belgium) Sven Nys	(Belgium) Bart Wellens	(Belgium) Mario De Clercq
2003–04	(Belgium) Bart Wellens	(Belgium) Sven Nys	(Belgium) Erwin Vervecken
2004–05	(Belgium) Sven Nys	(Netherlands) Richard Groenendaal	(Belgium) Sven Vanthourenhout
2005–06	(Belgium) Sven Nys	(Netherlands) Gerben de Knegt	(Belgium) Bart Wellens
2006–07	(Belgium) Sven Nys	(Belgium) Erwin Vervecken	(Belgium) Bart Wellens
2007–08	(Belgium) Sven Nys	(Belgium) Bart Wellens	(Belgium) Niels Albert
2008–09	(Belgium) Sven Nys	(Belgium) Klaas Vantornout	(Belgium) Bart Wellens
2009–10	(Czech Republic) Zdeněk Štybar	(Belgium) Niels Albert	(Belgium) Sven Nys
2010–11	(Belgium) Sven Nys	(Belgium) Kevin Pauwels	(Czech Republic) Zdeněk Štybar
2011–12	(Belgium) Sven Nys	(Belgium) Kevin Pauwels	(Czech Republic) Zdeněk Štybar
2012–13	(Belgium) Sven Nys	(Belgium) Niels Albert	(Belgium) Klaas Vantornout
2013–14	(Belgium) Sven Nys	(Belgium) Niels Albert	(Belgium) Tom Meeusen
2014–15	(Netherlands) Mathieu van der Poel	(Belgium) Kevin Pauwels	(Netherlands) Lars van der Haar
2015–16	(Belgium) Wout van Aert	(Belgium) Sven Nys	(Netherlands) Lars van der Haar
2016–17	(Netherlands) Mathieu van der Poel	(Belgium) Wout van Aert	(Belgium) Laurens Sweeck
2017–18	(Netherlands) Mathieu van der Poel	(Belgium) Wout van Aert	(Belgium) Laurens Sweeck
2018–19	(Netherlands) Mathieu van der Poel	(Belgium) Toon Aerts	(Netherlands) Lars van der Haar
2019–20	(Belgium) Laurens Sweeck	(Belgium) Eli Iserbyt	(Netherlands) Lars van der Haar
2020–21	(Belgium) Toon Aerts	(Belgium) Eli Iserbyt	(Belgium) Michael Vanthourenhout
2021–22	(Belgium) Eli Iserbyt	(Belgium) Toon Aerts	(Netherlands) Lars van der Haar
2022–23	(Netherlands) Lars van der Haar	(Belgium) Eli Iserbyt	(Belgium) Michael Vanthourenhout
2023–24	(Belgium) Eli Iserbyt	(Netherlands) Joris Nieuwenhuis	(Belgium) Niels Vandeputte
2024–25	(Belgium) Niels Vandeputte	(Netherlands) Lars van der Haar	(Belgium) Michael Vanthourenhout
2025–26	(Belgium) Niels Vandeputte	(Belgium) Michael Vanthourenhout	(Belgium) Joran Wyseure

=== Elite Women ===
Year	First	Second	Third
2015–16	(Belgium) Sanne Cant	(United Kingdom) Nikki Harris	(Belgium) Jolien Verschueren
2016–17	(Belgium) Sanne Cant	(Netherlands) Sophie de Boer	(Belgium) Ellen Van Loy
2017–18	(Belgium) Sanne Cant	(Netherlands) Maud Kaptheijns	(Netherlands) Annemarie Worst
2018–19	(Belgium) Sanne Cant	(Netherlands) Annemarie Worst	(Netherlands) Denise Betsema
2019–20	(Netherlands) Ceylin del Carmen Alvarado	(Netherlands) Yara Kastelijn	(Netherlands) Annemarie Worst
2020–21	(Netherlands) Lucinda Brand	(Netherlands) Ceylin del Carmen Alvarado	(Netherlands) Denise Betsema
2021–22	(Netherlands) Lucinda Brand	(Netherlands) Denise Betsema	(Netherlands) Annemarie Worst
2022–23	(Netherlands) Ceylin del Carmen Alvarado	(Netherlands) Inge van der Heijden	(Netherlands) Denise Betsema
2023–24	(Netherlands) Ceylin del Carmen Alvarado	(Netherlands) Annemarie Worst	(Netherlands) Aniek van Alphen
2024–25	(Netherlands) Lucinda Brand	(Netherlands) Ceylin del Carmen Alvarado	(Netherlands) Inge van der Heijden
2025–26	(Netherlands) Aniek van Alphen	(France) Amandine Fouquenet	(Netherlands) Inge van der Heijden

=== Under-23 Men ===
Until the 2019-20 season there was a separate classification for Under-23 Men.

Year	First	Second	Third
2002–03	(Netherlands) Thijs Verhagen	(Belgium) Bart Aernouts	(Belgium) Wesley Van Der Linden
2003–04	(Belgium) Wesley Van Der Linden	(Belgium) Klaas Vantornout	(Czech Republic) Martin Zlámalík
2004–05	(Belgium) Niels Albert	(Czech Republic) Radomír Šimůnek jr	(Netherlands) Lars Boom
2005–06	(Belgium) Niels Albert	(Netherlands) Eddy van IJzendoorn	(Belgium) Dieter Vanthourenhout
2006–07	(Belgium) Niels Albert	(Czech Republic) Zdeněk Štybar	(Belgium) Rob Peeters
2007–08	(Netherlands) Thijs van Amerongen	(Luxembourg) Jempy Drucker	(Switzerland) Julien Taramarcaz
2008–09	(Germany) Philipp Walsleben	(Belgium) Kenneth Van Compernolle	(Belgium) Tom Meeusen
2009–10	(Belgium) Tom Meeusen	(Belgium) Jim Aernouts	(Belgium) Kenneth Van Compernolle
2010–11	(Belgium) Jim Aernouts	(Netherlands) Lars van der Haar	(Belgium) Vincent Baestaens
2011–12	(Netherlands) Lars van der Haar	(Belgium) Wietse Bosmans	(Netherlands) Stan Godrie
2012–13	(Belgium) Wout van Aert	(Belgium) Jens Adams	(Belgium) Gianni Vermeersch
2013–14	(Netherlands) Mathieu van der Poel	(Belgium) Wout Van Aert	(Belgium) Gianni Vermeersch
2014–15	(Belgium) Michael Vanthourenhout	(Belgium) Laurens Sweeck	(Belgium) Toon Aerts
2015–16	(Belgium) Eli Iserbyt	(Belgium) Quinten Hermans	(Belgium) Daan Hoeyberghs
2016–17	(Belgium) Quinten Hermans	(Netherlands) Joris Nieuwenhuis	(Belgium) Nicolas Cleppe
2017–18	(Netherlands) Sieben Wouters	(Czech Republic) Adam Ťoupalík	(Netherlands) Jens Dekker
2018–19	(United Kingdom) Tom Pidcock	(United Kingdom) Ben Turner	(Belgium) Eli Iserbyt
2019–20	(United Kingdom) Tom Pidcock	(United Kingdom) Ben Turner	(Netherlands) Ryan Kamp

=== Under-23 Women ===
In the 2018-19 and 2019-20 seasons there was a separate classification for Under-23 Women.

Year	First	Second	Third
2018–19	(Netherlands) Ceylin del Carmen Alvarado	(Netherlands) Inge van der Heijden	(Netherlands) Fleur Nagengast
2019–20	(Netherlands) Ceylin del Carmen Alvarado	(Netherlands) Inge van der Heijden	(Netherlands) Shirin van Anrooij

=== Junior Men ===
Until the 2019-20 season there was a separate classification for Junior Men riders.

Year	First	Second	Third
2001–02	(Belgium) Kevin Pauwels	(Belgium) Dieter Vanthourenhout	(Belgium) Nick Sels
2002–03	(Netherlands) Lars Boom	(Netherlands) Eddy van IJzendoorn	(Belgium) Dieter Vanthourenhout
2003–04	(Belgium) Niels Albert	(Netherlands) Thijs van Amerongen	(Luxembourg) Jempy Drucker
2004–05	(Netherlands) Ricardo van der Velde	(Belgium) Tom Meeusen	(Belgium) Jan Van Dael
2005–06	(Belgium) Tom Meeusen	(Belgium) Kevin Cant	(Belgium) Kenneth Van Compernolle
2006–07	(Netherlands) Ramon Sinkeldam	(Belgium) Joeri Adams	(Belgium) Vincent Baestaens
2007–08	(Belgium) Stef Boden	(Netherlands) Tijmen Eising	(Netherlands) Geert van der Horst
2008–09	(Netherlands) Tijmen Eising	(Netherlands) Lars van der Haar	(Belgium) Wietse Bosmans
2009–10	(Netherlands) David van der Poel	(Belgium) Laurens Sweeck	(Netherlands) Mike Teunissen
2010–11	(Belgium) Laurens Sweeck	(Belgium) Diether Sweeck	(Belgium) Jens Vandekinderen
2011–12	(Netherlands) Mathieu van der Poel	(Belgium) Wout Van Aert	(Belgium) Daan Soete
2012–13	(Netherlands) Mathieu van der Poel	(Belgium) Quinten Hermans	(Netherlands) Martijn Budding
2013–14	(Belgium) Yannick Peeters	(Belgium) Thomas Joseph	(Belgium) Thijs Aerts
2014–15	(Belgium) Eli Iserbyt	(Switzerland) Johan Jacobs	(Netherlands) Maik van der Heijden
2015–16	(Netherlands) Jens Dekker	(Belgium) Jappe Jaspers	(Belgium) Seppe Rombouts
2016–17	(Belgium) Jelle Camps	(Belgium) Toon Vandebosch	(Netherlands) Thymen Arensman
2017–18	(Czech Republic) Tomáš Kopecký	(Netherlands) Ryan Kamp	(Netherlands) Pim Ronhaar
2018–19	(Belgium) Witse Meeussen	(Belgium) Ryan Cortjens	(Belgium) Lennert Belmans
2019–20	(Belgium) Thibau Nys	(Belgium) Lennert Belmans	(Belgium) Ward Huybs

== See also ==
- UCI Cyclo-cross World Cup
- Cyclo-cross Trophy
