= 1978 UCI Cyclo-cross World Championships =

Cyclo-cross championship

- Venue: Amorebieta-Etxano, Spain
- Date: 22 January 1978
- Coordinates: 43°13′9″N 2°44′3″W
- Cyclists participating: 28 (Elite); 45 (Amateurs)
- Events: 2

The 1978 UCI Cyclo-cross World Championships were held in Amorebieta-Etxano, Spain on Sunday 22 January 1978. It was the 29th edition of the UCI Cyclo-cross World Championships.

== Venue ==
The location was the slopes below the mountain village of Etxano. The course was 2.9 km long, with almost half of it laid out on meadows. Although the races themselves took place in good conditions, seven days of rain and snow had turned the course into a mud bath. For this reason, the distances were shortened by one lap each: the professionals started at noon with seven laps, and the amateurs at 2 p.m. with six. A total of 13 nations participated, and 15,000 spectators attended the event.

== Men's Amateurs race ==
In the amateur category, 45 riders started, but only 25 reached the finish line under the difficult conditions. Even defending champion Robert Vermeire from Belgium struggled and finished only eleventh. The world champion was surprisingly his compatriot Roland Liboton, who had previously finished only sixth in the Belgian championships, but led the field from the first lap. Behind him, a trio consisting of Karl-Heinz Helbling, Hennie Stamsnijder, and Miloš Fišera initially held the lead. Later, Swiss Gilles Blaser closed the gap from behind and, together with his compatriot Helbling, pulled away from the two leaders to claim the remaining podium positions.

== Men's Elite race ==
28 riders competed in the professional race. Belgium only fielded two riders, as former world champions Roger De Vlaeminck and Albert Van Damme had withdrawn at short notice due to illness and injury, respectively. Soon after the start, only four riders remained in contention for the win: the Swiss trio of Albert Zweifel, Peter Frischknecht, and Willi Lienhard, and the German Klaus-Peter Thaler. In the third lap, Zweifel broke away, pursued by Frischknecht, while Lienhard dropped back with a mechanical issue. Although Zweifel crashed several times on the slippery course, the gaps were so large that no further changes in position were expected from the middle of the race onward. Zweifel became world champion for the third time in a row, and Frischknecht finished second for the third time. Switzerland thus secured four of the six medals across both races.

== Men's Elite results ==
RANK	NAME	TIME
Gold medal	Albert Zweifel (SUI)	1:07:21
Silver medal	Peter Frischknecht (SUI)	+ 0:54
Bronze medal	Klaus-Peter Thaler (GER)	+ 2:32
4.	Willi Lienhard (SUI)	+ 4:32
5.	Marc De Block (BEL)	+ 6:28
6.	Erwin Lienhard (SUI)	+ 6:36
7.	Richard Steiner (SUI)	+ 6:47
8.	Eric Desruelle (BEL)	+ 7:03
9.	Gertie Wildeboer (NED)	+ 8:23
10.	Cees van der Wereld (NED)	+ 8:48

== Men's Amateurs results ==
RANK	NAME	TIME
Gold medal	Roland Liboton (BEL)	1:02:32
Silver medal	Gilles Blaser (SUI)	+ 0:21
Bronze medal	Karl-Heinz Helbling (SUI)	+ 0:30
4.	Hennie Stamsnijder (NED)	+ 1:18
5.	Vito Di Tano (ITA)	+ 1:37
6.	Jean-Yves Plaisance (FRA)	+ 1:54
7.	Andrzej Mąkowski (POL)	+ 2:04
8.	Alex Gérardin (FRA)	+ 2:17
9.	Miloš Fišera (TCH)	+ 2:22
10.	Franco Vagneur (ITA)	same time
