= 1989 UCI Cyclo-cross World Championships =

Cyclo-cross championship

- Location within France
- Venue: Pontchâteau, France
- Date: 28–29 January 1989
- Coordinates: 47°25′48″N 2°04′59″W
- Cyclists participating: 33 (Elite); 52 (Amateurs), 46 (Juniors)
- Events: 3

The 1989 UCI Cyclo-cross World Championships were held in Pontchâteau, France on 28 and 29 January 1989. It was the 40th edition of the UCI Cyclo-cross World Championships.

== Men's Elite results ==
| RANK | NAME | TIME |
|---|---|---|
| Gold medal | Danny De Bie (BEL) | 1:00:58 |
| Silver medal | Adrie van der Poel (NED) | + 0:24 |
| Bronze medal | Christophe Lavainne (FRA) | + 0:27 |
| 4. | Beat Breu (SUI) | same time |
| 5. | Henk Baars (NED) | same time |
| 6. | Volker Krukenbaum (BRD) | same time |
| 7. | Hennie Stamsnijder (NED) | + 0:29 |
| 8. | Paul De Brauwer (BEL) | + 0:33 |
| 9. | Ivan Messelis (BEL) | + 0:46 |
| 10. | Bruno D’Arsié (SUI) | + 1:13 |

== Men's Amateurs results ==
| RANK | NAME | TIME |
|---|---|---|
| Gold medal | Ondrej Glajza (CZE) | 54:28 |
| Silver medal | Radomír Šimůnek (CZE) | same time |
| Bronze medal | Roger Honegger (SUI) | same time |
| 4. | Peter Hric (CZE) | same time |
| 5. | Alain Daniel (FRA) | same time |
| 6. | Beat Wabel (SUI) | same time |
| 7. | Daniel Maquet (FRA) | same time |
| 8. | Miloslav Kvasnička (CZE) | same time |
| 9. | Damiano Grego (ITA) | + 0:09 |
| 10. | Bruno Lebras (FRA) | + 0:13 |

== Men's Juniors results ==
| RANK | NAME | TIME |
|---|---|---|
| Gold medal | Richard Groenendaal (NED) | 42:30 |
| Silver medal | Emmanuel Magnien (FRA) | + 0:09 |
| Bronze medal | Christian Bertotti (ITA) | + 1:07 |
| 4. | Roland Schätti (SUI) | + 1:09 |
| 5. | José Jauregui (FRA) | + 1:11 |
| 6. | Urs Markwalder (SUI) | + 1:13 |
| 7. | Niels van der Steen (NED) | same time |
| 8. | Attilo Leni (ITA) | same time |
| 9. | Frank Esch (BRD) | same time |
| 10. | Andreas Hubmann (SUI) | same time |
