= 1986 UCI Cyclo-cross World Championships =

Cyclo-cross championship

Coordinates: 50°43′N 4°13′E

- Venue: Lembeek, Belgium
- Date: 25–26 January 1986
- Cyclists participating: 29 (Elite); 46 (Amateurs), 44 (Juniors)
- Events: 3

The 1986 UCI Cyclo-cross World Championships were held in Lembeek, Belgium on 25 and 26 January 1986. It was the 37th edition of the UCI Cyclo-cross World Championships.

== Men's Elite results ==
| RANK | NAME | TIME |
|---|---|---|
| Gold medal | Albert Zweifel (SUI) | 1:16:33 |
| Silver medal | Pascal Richard (SUI) | + 0:38 |
| Bronze medal | Hennie Stamsnijder (NED) | + 1:15 |
| 4. | Reinier Groenendaal (NED) | + 3:11 |
| 5. | Martial Gayant (FRA) | + 3:44 |
| 6. | Paul De Brauwer (BEL) | + 4:10 |
| 7. | Beat Breu (SUI) | + 4:29 |
| 8. | Frank van Bakel (NED) | + 5:16 |
| 9. | Patrice Thévenard (FRA) | + 5:26 |
| 10. | Robert Vermeire (BEL) | + 5:36 |

== Men's Amateurs results ==
| RANK | NAME | TIME |
|---|---|---|
| Gold medal | Vito Di Tano (ITA) | 1:08:30 |
| Silver medal | Ivan Messelis (BEL) | + 1:19 |
| Bronze medal | Ludo De Rey (BEL) | + 1:36 |
| 4. | Hans-Rüdi Büchi (SUI) | + 2:01 |
| 5. | Damiano Grego (ITA) | + 2:12 |
| 6. | Alain Daniel (FRA) | + 2:25 |
| 7. | Dirk Pauwels (BEL) | s.t. |
| 8. | Petr Klouček (CZE) | + 2:37 |
| 9. | Peter Hric (CZE) | + 2:38 |
| 10. | Huub Kools (NED) | s.t. |

== Men's Juniors results ==
| RANK | NAME | TIME |
|---|---|---|
| Gold medal | Stuart Marshall (GBR) | 52:05 |
| Silver medal | Beat Brechbühl (SUI) | + 0:17 |
| Bronze medal | Wim de Vos (NED) | + 0:24 |
| 4. | Rudy Nagengast (NED) | s.t. |
| 5. | Markus Meier (SUI) | + 0:33 |
| 6. | Marc Janssens (BEL) | s.t. |
| 7. | Kamil Polák (CZE) | s.t. |
| 8. | Pavel Camrda (CZE) | + 0:37 |
| 9. | Jens Schwedler (GER) | + 1:02 |
| 10. | Tomáš Port (CZE) | + 1:14 |
