= 1984 UCI Cyclo-cross World Championships =

Cyclo-cross championship

- Location within Netherlands
- Venue: Oss, Netherlands
- Date: 18–19 February 1984
- Coordinates: 51°46′N 5°31′E
- Cyclists participating: 25 (Elite); 48 (Amateurs), 43 (Juniors)
- Events: 3

The 1984 UCI Cyclo-cross World Championships were held in Oss, Netherlands on 18 and 19 February 1984. It was the 35th edition of the UCI Cyclo-cross World Championships.

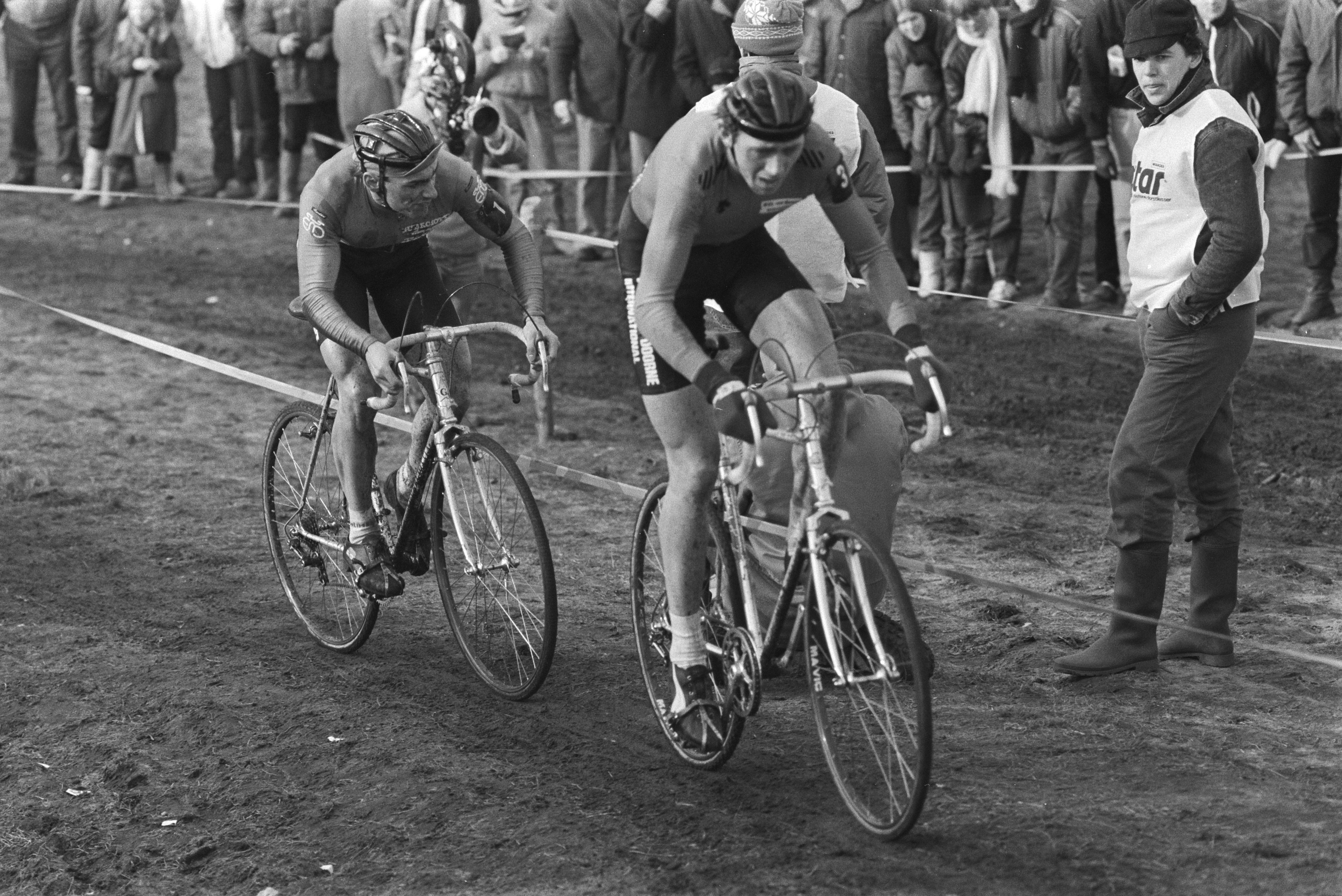
Hennie Stamsnijder in the lead, followed by eventual world champion Roland Liboton

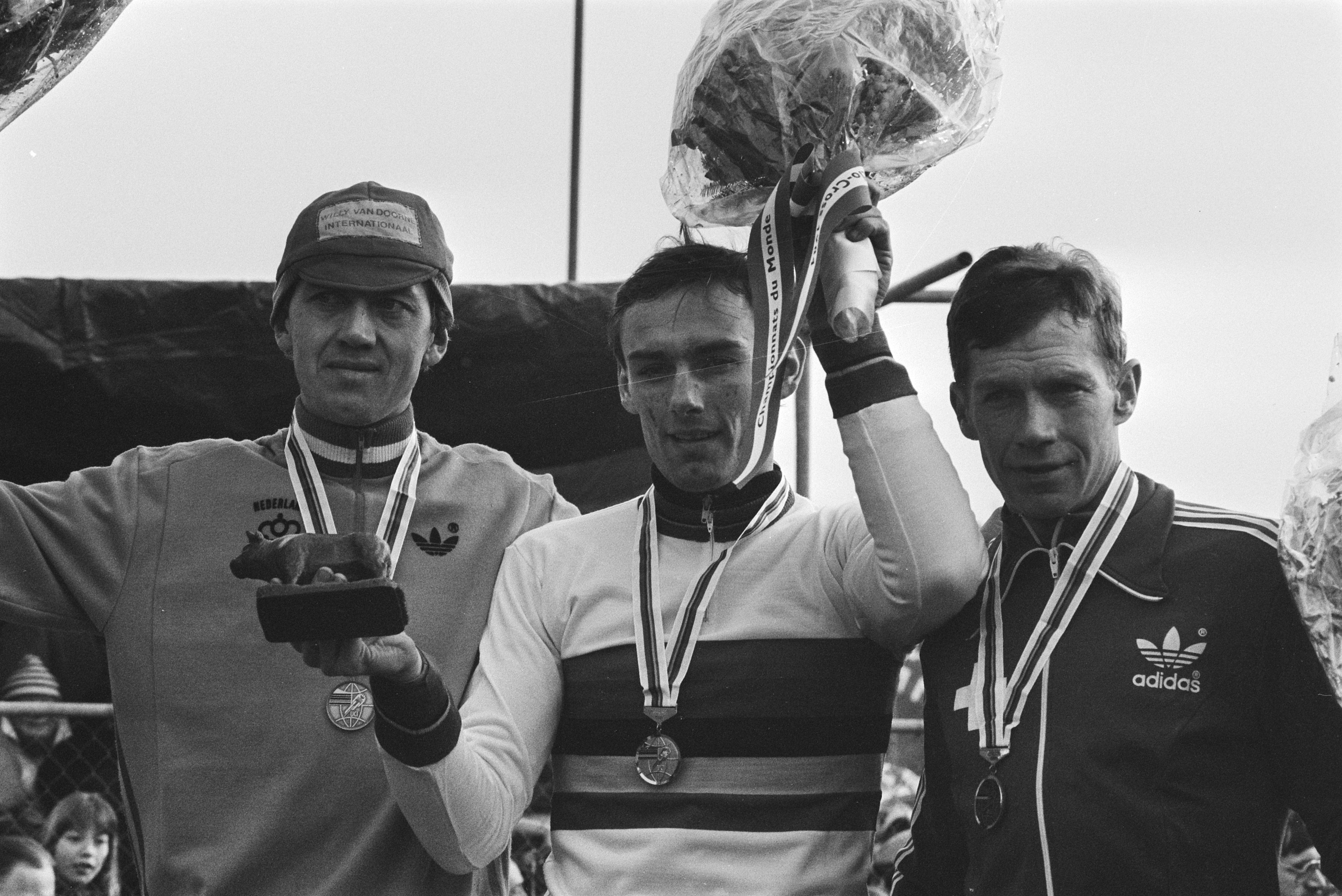
Men's Elite podium, from left: Stamsnijder, Liboton and Zweifel

== Men's Elite results ==
RANK	NAME	TIME
Gold medal	Roland Liboton (BEL)	1:06:22
Silver medal	Hennie Stamsnijder (NED)	s.t.
Bronze medal	Albert Zweifel (SUI)	s.t.
4.	Robert Vermeire (BEL)	+ 0:19
5.	Johan Ghyllebert (BEL)	+ 0:53
6.	Reinier Groenendaal (NED)	+ 1:09
7.	Paul De Brauwer (BEL)	+ 1:35
8.	Claude Michely (LUX)	+ 1:37
9.	Reimund Dietzen (BRD)	+ 1:59
10.	Cees van der Wereld (NED)	+ 2:03

== Men's Amateurs results ==
RANK	NAME	TIME
Gold medal	Radomír Šimůnek (CZE)	1:05:24
Silver medal	Miloslav Kvasnička (CZE)	+ 0:03
Bronze medal	Frank van Bakel (NED)	+ 0:20
4.	Ivan Messelis (BEL)	+ 0:23
5.	Radovan Fořt (CZE)	+ 0:26
6.	Grzegorz Jaroszewski (POL)	+ 0:41
7.	Mathieu Hermans (NED)	+ 0:53
8.	Peter Hric (CZE)	s.t.
9.	Hans Boom (NED)	+ 0:55
10.	Ludo De Rey (BEL)	+ 0:55

== Men's Juniors results ==
RANK	NAME	TIME
Gold medal	Ondrej Glajza (CZE)	48:05
Silver medal	Robert Dane (GBR)	+ 0:16
Bronze medal	Richard Koberna (CZE)	+ 0:41
4.	Josef Jiřička (CZE)	+ 0:53
5.	Johan Reumer (NED)	s.t.
6.	Hans Hietbrink (NED)	+ 1:11
7.	Dieter Runkel (SUI)	+ 1:28
8.	Johnny Blomme (BEL)	+ 1:42
9.	Henrik Djernis (DEN)	+ 1:44
10.	Beat Wabel (SUI)	+ 1:53
