= UCI Hall of Fame =

- Sport: Cycling

History
- First award: 2002

The UCI Hall of Fame, that not to be confused with Cycling Hall of Fame or the University of California, Irvine's Hall of Fame, was launched by the Union Cycliste Internationale (UCI) in 2002 to "honor all those who by their heroic deeds or their personalities have greatly contributed to the glory and development of cycling sport throughout the world". The inauguration was part of the celebrations marking the 100th anniversary of both the Paris–Roubaix race and the founding of the UCI, which also included the opening of the World Cycling Centre in Aigle, Switzerland, where the hall of fame is located. There have been no inductions since 2002.

== Hall of Fame members ==
Inductee	Nationality	Discipline
Vittorio Adorni	Italy	Road
Jacques Anquetil	France	Road
Moreno Argentin	Italy	Road
Federico Bahamontes	Spain	Road
Ercole Baldini	Italy	Road
Félicia Ballanger	France	Track
Gino Bartali	Italy	Road
Alfredo Binda	Italy	Road
Louison Bobet	France	Road
Gianni Bugno	Italy	Road
Maria Canins	Italy	Road
Eugène Christophe	France	Road
Fausto Coppi	Italy	Road
Erik De Vlaeminck	Belgium	Cyclo-cross
André Dufraisse	France	Cyclo-cross
Urs Freuler	Switzerland	Track
Maurice Garin	France	Road
Charly Gaul	Luxembourg	Road
Felice Gimondi	Italy	Road
Bernard Hinault	France	Road
Michael Hübner	Germany	Track
Miguel Indurain	Spain	Road
Jan Janssen	Netherlands	Road
Sean Kelly	Ireland	Road
Ferdinand Kübler	Switzerland	Road
Hennie Kuiper	Netherlands	Road
André Leducq	France	Road
Greg LeMond	United States	Road
Lucien Lesna	France	Road
Roland Liboton	Belgium	Cyclo-cross
Jeannie Longo	France	Road
Renato Longo	Italy	Cyclo-cross
Antonin Magne	France	Road
Freddy Maertens	Belgium	Road
Fiorenzo Magni	Italy	Road
Antonio Maspes	Italy	Track
Eddy Merckx	Belgium	Road
Daniel Morelon	France	Track
Francesco Moser	Italy	Road
Ned Overend	United States	Mountain bike
Raymond Poulidor	France	Road
Stephen Roche	Ireland	Road
Michel Rousseau	France	Track
Giuseppe Saronni	Italy	Road
Jef Scherens	Belgium	Track
Briek Schotte	Belgium	Road
Georges Speicher	France	Road
Major Taylor	United States	Track
Klaus-Peter Thaler	Germany	Cyclo-cross
Philippe Thys	Belgium	Road
Rik Van Looy	Belgium	Road
Rik Van Steenbergen	Belgium	Road
Rolf Wolfshohl	Germany	Cyclo-cross
Arie van Vliet	Netherlands	Track
Arthur Augustus Zimmerman	United States	Track
Joop Zoetemelk	Netherlands	Road
Albert Zweifel	Switzerland	Cyclo-cross
