= Ondrej Glajza =

Ondrej Glajza may refer to:

- Ondrej Glajza (cyclist, born 1966), Slovak cyclo-cross cyclist and coach
- Ondrej Glajza (cyclist, born 1994), Slovak cyclist
