= Azencross =

Belgian cyclo-cross race

Race details
- Date: December
- Region: Loenhout, Belgium
- English name: The Cyclo-cross of the Aces
- Discipline: Cyclo-cross
- Competition: Exact Cross
- Type: one-day

History (men)
- First edition: 1984
- Editions: 40 (as of 2024)
- First winner: Roland Liboton (BEL)
- Most wins: (Netherlands) Mathieu van der Poel(6 wins) Sven Nys (BEL)
- Most recent: Mathieu van der Poel (NED)

History (women)
- First edition: 1998
- Editions: 25 (as of 2024)
- First winner: Daphny van den Brand (NED)
- Most wins: Daphny van den Brand (NED); (6 wins)
- Most recent: Marion Norbert-Riberolle (BEL)

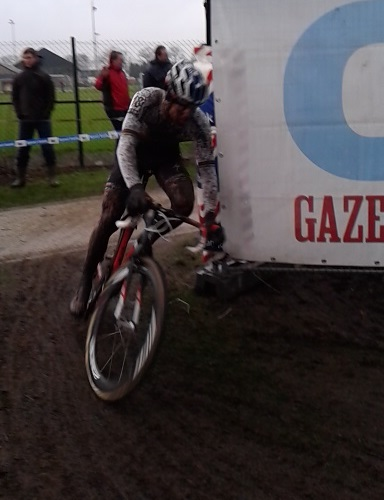
Zdeněk Štybar in the 2012 edition

The Azencross is a cyclo-cross race held in Loenhout village, Wuustwezel, Belgium. The race has been organized since 1984 and is named after the cycling race Critérium des As in Paris. During 1987-1992 and 2001-2021 the race was part of the Cyclo-cross Trophy series, except for the 2020 edition which was cancelled due to the COVID-19 pandemic. During 1993-1995 the race was part of UCI Cyclo-cross World Cup. Since 2022 the race has been part of the Exact Cross series.

In 1998 the Azencross became the first Belgian cyclo-cross race to organize a race for women. Daphny van den Brand won that race.

Azencross was the first cyclo-cross event that introduced a 'washboard' (wasbord in Dutch), which is a section of the circuit consisting of several successive bumps.

== Past winners ==
Year	Men's winner	Women's winner
2025	(Netherlands) Mathieu van der Poel	(Netherlands) Lucinda Brand
2024	(Netherlands) Mathieu van der Poel	(Belgium) Marion Norbert-Riberolle
2023	(Netherlands) Mathieu van der Poel	(Belgium) Sanne Cant
2022	(Belgium) Wout Van Aert	(Netherlands) Shirin van Anrooij
2021	(Belgium) Wout Van Aert	(Netherlands) Lucinda Brand
2020	Cancelled due to COVID-19 pandemic	
2019	(Netherlands) Mathieu van der Poel	(Netherlands) Ceylin del Carmen Alvarado
2018	(Netherlands) Mathieu van der Poel	(Netherlands) Lucinda Brand
2017	(Netherlands) Mathieu van der Poel	(Belgium) Sanne Cant
2016	(Belgium) Wout Van Aert	(Belgium) Sanne Cant
2015	(Belgium) Tom Meeusen	(Belgium) Sanne Cant
2014	(Belgium) Wout Van Aert	(Czech Republic) Kateřina Nash
2013	(Belgium) Sven Nys	(Netherlands) Marianne Vos
2012	(Belgium) Niels Albert	(Belgium) Sanne Cant
2011	(Belgium) Niels Albert	(Netherlands) Marianne Vos
2010	(Belgium) Niels Albert	(Netherlands) Marianne Vos
2009	(Belgium) Sven Nys	(Netherlands) Daphny Van Den Brand
2008	(Czech Republic) Zdeněk Štybar	(Netherlands) Daphny van den Brand
2007	(Netherlands) Lars Boom	(Germany) Hanka Kupfernagel
2006	(Belgium) Niels Albert	(Germany) Hanka Kupfernagel
2005	(Belgium) Sven Nys	(Netherlands) Marianne Vos
2004	(Belgium) Sven Nys	(Netherlands) Daphny van den Brand
2003	(Belgium) Bart Wellens	(Germany) Hanka Kupfernagel
2002	(Belgium) Sven Nys	(Netherlands) Daphny Van Den Brand
2001	(Belgium) Erwin Vervecken	(Netherlands) Daphny Van Den Brand
2000	(Belgium) Sven Nys	not held
1999	(Netherlands) Richard Groenendaal	(Germany) Hanka Kupfernagel
1998	(Belgium) Marc Janssens	(Netherlands) Daphny Van Den Brand
1997	(Netherlands) Adrie van der Poel	First held in 1998
1996	(Netherlands) Adrie van der Poel	First held in 1998
1995	(Belgium) Paul Herygers	First held in 1998
1994	(Czech Republic) Radomír Šimůnek, Sr.	First held in 1998
1993	(Belgium) Marc Janssens	First held in 1998
1992	(Netherlands) Adrie van der Poel	First held in 1998
1991	(Belgium) Danny De Bie	First held in 1998
1990	(Belgium) Danny De Bie	First held in 1998
1989	(Belgium) Danny De Bie	First held in 1998
1988	(Belgium) Roland Liboton	First held in 1998
1987	(Netherlands) Hennie Stamsnijder	First held in 1998
1986	(Netherlands) Hennie Stamsnijder	First held in 1998
1985	(Belgium) Roland Liboton	First held in 1998
1984	(Belgium) Roland Liboton	First held in 1998
