= 1991 UCI Cyclo-cross World Championships =

Cyclo-cross championship

- Venue: Gieten, Netherlands
- Date: 2–3 February 1991
- Coordinates: 53°0′19″N 6°45′47″E
- Cyclists participating: 30 (Elite); 54 (Amateurs), 45 (Juniors)
- Events: 3

The 1991 UCI Cyclo-cross World Championships were held in Gieten, Netherlands on 2 and 3 February 1991. It was the 42nd edition of the UCI Cyclo-cross World Championships.

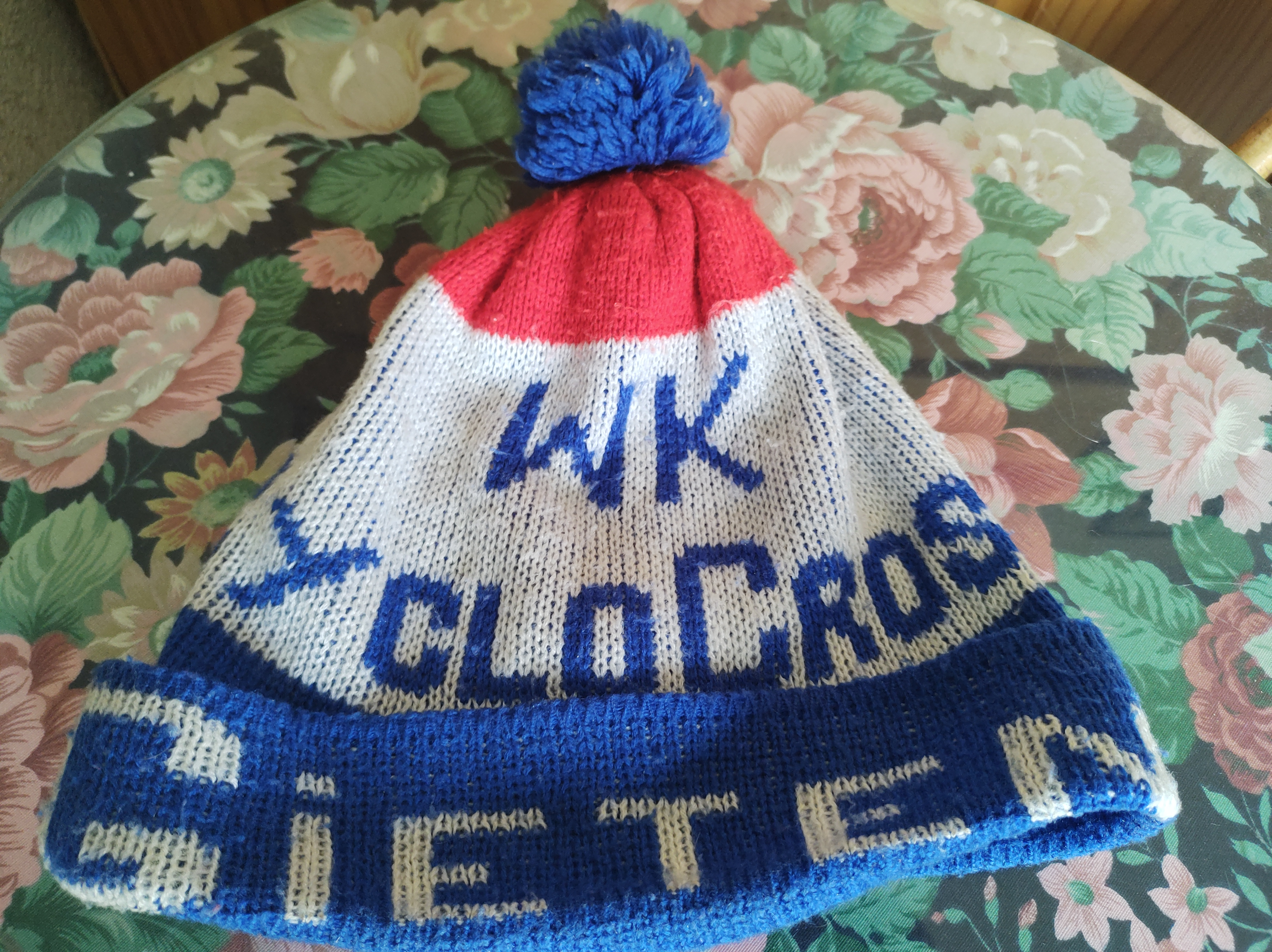
1991 World Championship hat

== Men's Elite results ==
| RANK | NAME | TIME |
|---|---|---|
| Gold medal | Radomír Šimůnek (CZE) | 1:04:22 |
| Silver medal | Adrie van der Poel (NED) | s.t. |
| Bronze medal | Bruno Lebras (FRA) | + 0:06 |
| 4. | Henk Baars (NED) | + 0:24 |
| 5. | Wim Lambrechts (BEL) | + 0:28 |
| 6. | Frank van Bakel (NED) | + 0:34 |
| 7. | Roger Honegger (SUI) | + 0:37 |
| 8. | Martin Hendriks (NED) | + 0:46 |
| 9. | Dominique Arnould (FRA) | + 1:06 |
| 10. | Christophe Lavainne (FRA) | + 1:40 |

== Men's Amateurs results ==
| RANK | NAME | TIME |
|---|---|---|
| Gold medal | Thomas Frischknecht (SUI) | 50:19 |
| Silver medal | Henrik Djernis (DEN) | + 0:23 |
| Bronze medal | Daniele Pontoni (ITA) | + 0:24 |
| 4. | Marcel Gerritsen (NED) | + 0:26 |
| 5. | Edward Kuijper (NED) | + 0:31 |
| 6. | Timo Berner (GER) | + 0:32 |
| 7. | Rudy Thielemans (BEL) | + 0:44 |
| 8. | Beat Wabel (SUI) | + 0:45 |
| 9. | Radovan Fořt (CZE) | + 0:54 |
| 10. | Pavel Elsnic (CZE) | + 0:59 |

== Men's Juniors results ==
| RANK | NAME | TIME |
|---|---|---|
| Gold medal | Ondřej Lukeš (CZE) | 45:47 |
| Silver medal | Jiří Pospíšil (CZE) | s.t. |
| Bronze medal | Dariusz Gil (POL) | s.t. |
| 4. | Václav Metlička (CZE) | + 0:01 |
| 5. | Jan Ullrich (GER) | s.t. |
| 6. | Jan Faltýnek (CZE) | + 0:04 |
| 7. | Marcel Vrogten (NED) | + 0:21 |
| 8. | Tomasz Bukowski (POL) | + 0:36 |
| 9. | Roman Jördens (GER) | + 0:45 |
| 10. | Patrick Flamm (GER) | + 0:48 |
