= 1990 UCI Cyclo-cross World Championships =

Cyclo-cross championship

- Venue: Getxo, Spain
- Date: 3–4 February 1990
- Coordinates: 43°20′39″N 3°0′23″W
- Cyclists participating: 33 (Elite); 46 (Amateurs), 42 (Juniors)
- Events: 3

The 1990 UCI Cyclo-cross World Championships were held in Getxo, Spain on 3 and 4 February 1990. It was the 41st edition of the UCI Cyclo-cross World Championships.

== Men's Elite results ==
RANK	NAME	TIME
Gold medal	Henk Baars (NED)	1:03:14
Silver medal	Adrie van der Poel (NED)	+ 0:05
Bronze medal	Bruno Lebras (FRA)	s.t.
4.	Frank van Bakel (NED)	s.t.
5.	Paul De Brauwer (BEL)	s.t.
6.	Pascal Richard (SUI)	s.t.
7.	Radomír Šimůnek (CZE)	+ 0:09
8.	Karel Camrda (CZE)	+ 0:15
9.	Beat Breu (SUI)	s.t.
10.	Roger Honegger (SUI)	+ 0:52

== Men's Amateurs results ==
RANK	NAME	TIME
Gold medal	Andreas Büsser (SUI)	48:27
Silver medal	Miloslav Kvasnička (CZE)	+ 0:12
Bronze medal	Thomas Frischknecht (SUI)	+ 0:15
4.	Edward Piech (POL)	+ 0:18
5.	Edward Kuijper (NED)	+ 0:23
6.	Johnny Blomme (BEL)	+ 0:27
7.	Richard Groenendaal (NED)	+ 0:30
8.	Frank Groenendaal (NED)	+ 0:41
9.	Dieter Runkel (SUI)	+ 0:42
10.	Peter Hric (CZE)	+ 0:43

== Men's Juniors results ==
RANK	NAME	TIME
Gold medal	Erik Boezewinkel (NED)	41:51
Silver medal	Jérôme Chiotti (FRA)	+ 0:12
Bronze medal	Niels van der Steen (NED)	+ 0:16
4.	Jiří Pospíšil (CZE)	+ 0:23
5.	Dariusz Gil (POL)	+ 0:37
6.	Erwin Vervecken (BEL)	+ 0:54
7.	Tim Kroll (GER)	+ 1:19
8.	Yannick Holweck (FRA)	s.t.
9.	Roman Jördens (GER)	+ 1:32
10.	Patrick Flamm (GER)	+ 1:33
