= Stamsnijder =

Stamsnijder is a surname. Notable people with the surname include:

- Hennie Stamsnijder (born 1954), Dutch bicycle racer
- Tom Stamsnijder (born 1985), Dutch bicycle racer
