= Fort Frames =

Czech bicycle manufacturer

Fort Frames s.r.o
- Company type: Společnost s ručením omezeným
- Industry: Bicycle manufacturing
- Founded: 1992
- Headquarters: Ústí nad Orlicí, Czech Republic
- Products: Bicycle frames
- Number of employees: 60
- Website: https://fort-frames.cz/cs/home/

Fort Frames s.r.o. is a Czech bicycle manufacturer based in Ústí nad Orlicí in the Pardubice Region.

== History ==
Fort Frames was founded in 1992. One of the founders was the four-time Czech cross-country winner Radovan Fořt. Forts name was adopted for the brand of the company. Fort Frames is specialized in small series (5 to 100 frames per size). Since a high degree of automation is not economical with the small quantities, Fort still carries out many production steps by hand.
