= Ondrej Glajza (cyclist, born 1966) =

Personal information
- Born: 22 March 1966 (age 60) Poprad, Czechoslovakia

Cycling career
- Sport: Cycling
- Discipline: Cyclo-cross
- Role: Rider

Amateur teams
- Poprad
- Inter Bratislava
Medal record
Gold medal – first place	1989 UCI Cyclo-cross WC	Amateurs

Ondrej Glajza (born 22 March 1966) is a Slovak cyclo-cross rider who completed for Czechoslovakia. He is the most successful Slovak cyclo-cross cyclist in the history to date. He is the father of professional cyclist Ondrej Glajza (born 1994).

== Career ==
He was active in the sport from 1972 to 1991. Representing Czechoslovakia, he won two world championship titles:

1984 – Junior category

1989 – Amateur men's category

He won a total of four medals at the Czechoslovak championships in the men's category, including two gold medals:

1985 – 3rd place

1986 – 1st place

1988 – 1st place

1989 – 2nd place

In May 1989, he emigrated from Czechoslovakia (ČSSR) to West Berlin. After the revolution, he returned and once again represented Czechoslovakia, this time as a professional.

He competed twice in the World Championships in the Elite (professional) category:

1990 – 27th place

1991 – 13th place

From 1993 to 1999, he served as the coach of the Slovak national cyclo-cross team. He is currently active in cycling again. Representing the FCT Považská Bystrica cycling club, he competes in veteran-class events for cyclo-cross and mountain biking.
