= Danny De Bie =

Belgian cyclist

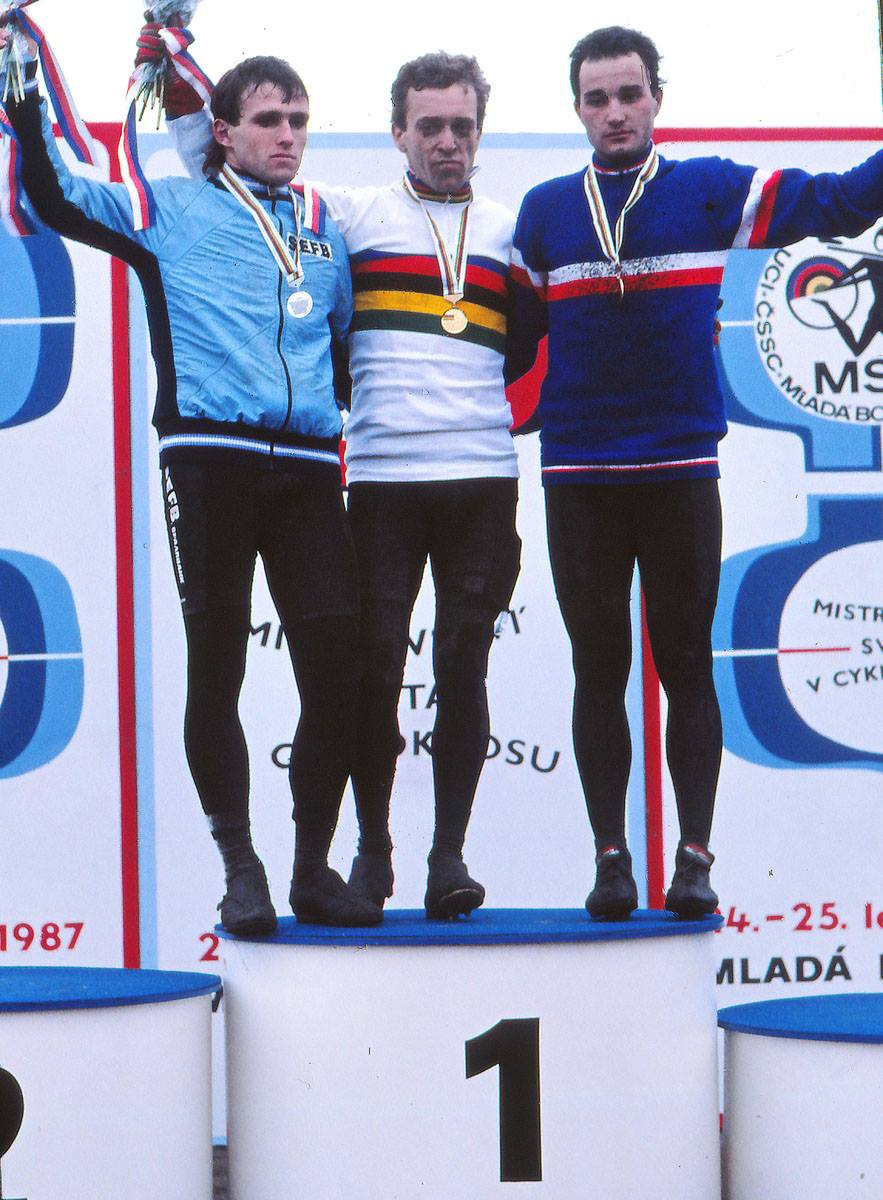
- De Bie (left) at the 1987 UCI Cyclo-cross World Championships

Personal information
- Full name: Danny De Bie
- Born: 23 January 1960 (age 66)

Cycling career
- Sport: Cycling
- Current team: Retired
- Disciplines: Road; Cyclo-cross
- Role: Rider (retired); Directeur sportif

Professional teams
- 1987–1991: S.E.F.B.–Gipiemme
- 1992–1994: Bankunie
- 1995: Rolini Sportswear

Managerial teams
- 2000–2014: Spaarselect
- 2015: Colba–Superano Ham

Major wins
- Cyclo-cross World Championships (1989) National Championships (1990, 1991, 1992) Superprestige (1989–1990)
Medal record
Representing Belgium
Men's cyclo-cross
World Championships
Gold medal – first place	1989 Pontchâteau	Elite Race
Silver medal – second place	1987 Mladá Boleslav	Elite Race

Danny De Bie (born 23 January 1960) is a former Belgian professional cyclist and directeur sportif, who won the men's race at the 1989 UCI Cyclo-cross World Championships. His brothers Eddy De Bie and Rudy De Bie also competed professionally.

== Career ==
Born in Beersel, De Bie achieved several successes on the road but started to focus on cyclo-cross full-time after taking the silver medal at the 1987 UCI Cyclo-cross World Championships. He went to Switzerland which was at that time the main place for cyclo-cross races. Two years later he achieved that. The World Cyclo-Cross Championships parcours at Pont-Château in 1989, was a course that was suited to him. De Bie was able to cycle up a tough climb of almost 100 metres where his opponents such as Adri van der Poel had to walk and as a result De Bie was able to make a gap every time he went over the climb. After winning the rainbow jersey, De Bie became one of the best cyclo crossers of the world with a win in the Superprestige classification and increased popularity for the sport in Belgium.

In 1991 De Bie was suspected of possible tampering with a doping control after a Superprestige race in Zillebeke and he was not allowed to take part in the World Championships that year in Gieten. De Bie was Belgium cyclo-cross champion for three years in a row and then beaten by Paul Herijgers. De Bie in his career won 11 Superprestige races.

After his career he worked as directeur sportif for the Spaarselect team between 2000 and 2014, Colba–Superano Ham in 2015 and Tarteletto–Isorex in 2017.

== Major results ==
=== Cyclo-cross ===
1986–1987
2nd World cyclo-cross championship
Superprestige

2nd Zillebeke

1987–1988
3rd National Championships
1988–1989
1st World cyclo-cross championship
Superprestige

1st Overijse
2nd Gavere
3rd Wetzikon

GvA Trophy

1st Koksijde

1st Breendonk
2nd Putte-Peulis
3rd National Championships
1989–1990
1st National Championships
1st Overall Superprestige

1st Plzeň
1st Diegem
1st Gavere
1st Overijse
1st Zillebeke
2nd Gieten
2nd Zürich-Waid
2nd Overijse
3rd Valenswaard

GvA Trophy

1st Koksijde
1st Niel
1st Loenhout

1st Mol
2nd Harnes
1990–1991
1st National Championships
1st Contern
2nd Overall Superprestige

1st Gavere
1st Gieten
1st Plzeň
2nd Zillebeke
3rd Valenswaard

GvA Trophy

1st Loenhout

1st Kalmthout
1991–1992
1st National Championships
2nd Overall Superprestige

1st Diegem
1st Gieten
3rd Gavere

GvA Trophy

1st Loenhout
1st Essen
1st Koksijde

2nd Kalmthout
1992–1993
2nd National Championships
3rd Overall Superprestige

1st Gieten
2nd Harnes
3rd Gavere

GvA Trophy

1st Essen
1st Koksijde

1993–1994
1st Sint-Niklaas
1st Heist-op-den-Berg
2nd Overall GvA Trophy

1st Essen
1st Kalmthout
1st Niel
2nd Hoogstraten
3rd Koksijde

2nd Overall UCI World Cup

2nd Igorre
4th Eindhoven
4th Eschenbach
5th Loenhout

2nd National Championships
2nd Vladslo
2nd Wingene
Superprestige

3rd Gavere

3rd Cublize
3rd Telleriarte
1994–1995
1st Heist-op-den-Berg
2nd National Championships
3rd Sint-Lievens-Esse
1995–1996
2nd Zonnebeke
3rd Veldegem
1996–1997
1st Löhne
1st Meiningen
3rd Koppenberg
3rd Uster
1997–1998
Superprestige

1st Ruddervoorde
3rd Gavere

1st Aachen
1st Dover
1st Lanarvily
1st Löhne
1st Paal
2nd Overall GvA Trophy

2nd Rijkevorsel
2nd Niel

2nd Veldegem
3rd Charleville-Mezières
3rd Volketswil
1998–1999
2nd Charleville-Mezières
3rd Nottingham
1999–2000
2nd Westerlo
2nd München
3rd Beuvry

=== Road ===
1977
1st Sint-Martinusprijs Kontich
1978
1st Dusika Jugend Tour
1979
1st Stage 7 Omloop van de Kempen
1984
1st Stage 3 Ronde van Brabant
