= Cyclophile Aigle =

The Cyclophile Aigle is a cyclo-cross race held in Aigle, Switzerland, which is part of the UCI Cyclo-cross World Cup.

== Past winners ==
Year	Men's winner	Women's winner
2010	(Czech Republic) Zdeněk Štybar	(United States) Katie Compton
2009	(Switzerland) Marcel Wildhaber	(Switzerland) Jasmin Achermann
2008	Race not held	
2007	(Switzerland) Simon Zahner	(Switzerland) Jasmin Achermann
2006	(Belgium) Sven Nys	not held
2005	(Belgium) Sven Vanthourenhout	not held
2003	(Czech Republic) Jiri Pospisil	(Switzerland) Alexandra Bähler
2002	(Belgium) Marc Janssens	not held
2001	(Switzerland) David Rusch	not held
1991	(Switzerland) Fabian Jeker	not held
1990	(Switzerland) Beat Breu	not held
1989	(Switzerland) Pascal Richard	not held
1988	(Switzerland) Beat Breu	not held
1987	(Switzerland) Pascal Richard	not held
1986	(Switzerland) Pascal Richard	not held
1985	(Switzerland) Pascal Richard	not held
1976	(Switzerland) Albert Zweifel	not held
1975	(Switzerland) Albert Zweifel	not held
1974	(Switzerland) Üli Müller	not held
1973	(Czechoslovakia) Voitek Cervinek	not held
1972	(Belgium) Albert Van Damme	not held
1971	(Belgium) Eric De Vlaeminck	not held
1970	(Belgium) Eric De Vlaeminck	not held
