= Marc Janssens =

Belgian cyclist

Personal information
- Born: 13 November 1968 (age 57) Duffel, Belgian

Cycling career
- Sport: Cycling
- Current team: Retired
- Disciplines: Cyclo-cross, road
- Role: Rider

Amateur teams
- 1991: S.E.F.B.–Saxon–Gan (stagiaire)
- 1992: Lotto–Mavic–MBK (stagiaire)

Professional teams
- 1993: Sofinvest–Chief
- 1993–1994: Espace Card
- 1995–1996: Collstrop–Lystex
- 1997–2001: Palmans–Lystex

Marc Janssens (born 13 November 1968 in Duffel) is a Belgian former cyclo-cross cyclist.

Professional from 1993 to 2001, he won the Belgian national cyclo-cross championship three times. He also won the Gazet van Antwerpen Trophy twice, placed third in the World Cup twice, and finished second in the 1996 Superprestige. After his racing career, he became a commentator of cyclo-cross competitions on the Flemish TV channel VT4. He is also currently a directeur sportif for the ERA team.

== Major results ==
=== Cyclo-cross ===
1987
1st UCI World Junior Championships
1993
1st Loenhout
1994
2nd Overall Superprestige
3rd Overall UCI World Cup
1995
1st National Championships
4th Overall Superprestige
1996
1st Niel
1997
1st Otegem
3rd Overall UCI World Cup
5th Overall Superprestige
1998
1st National Championships
1st Loenhout
4th Overall UCI World Cup
1999
1st National Championships
5th Overall UCI World Cup
2002
1st Aigle

=== Road ===
1989
1st Stage 5 Tour de Namur
1991
1st Stage 1 Tour de Liège
1st Stage 3 Tour de Namur
1992
Tour de Liège

1st Stages 4a & 4b (ITT)

1993
1st Liège–Bastogne–Liège Espoirs
3rd Overall Tour de Liège

1st Stages 1 & 3
