= Lennert Belmans =

Belgian cyclist (born 2002)

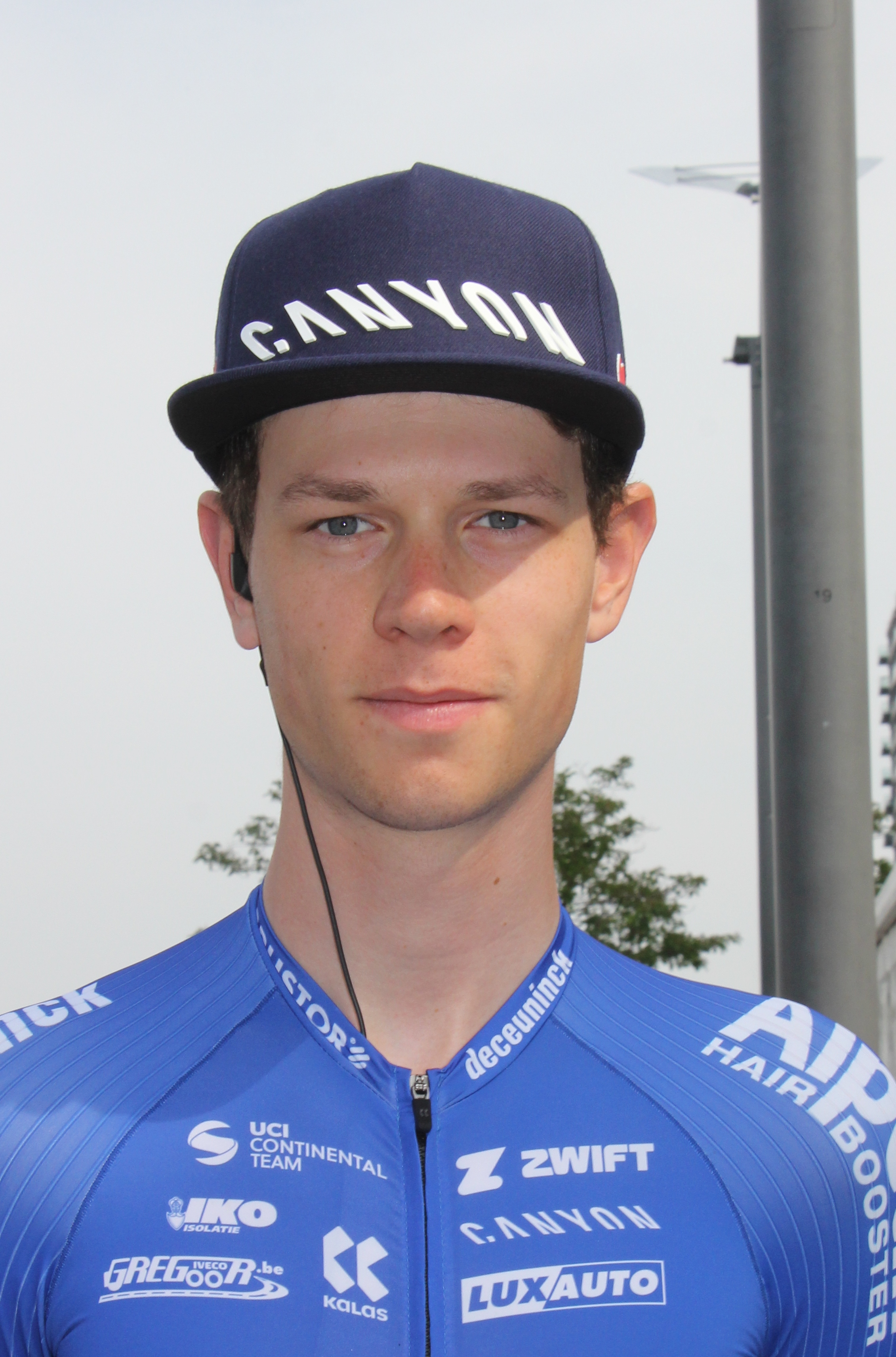
- Belmans at the 2023 Rund um Köln

Personal information
- Born: 15 February 2002 (age 24) Wechelderzande, Belgium
- Height: 1.89 m (6 ft 2 in)
- Weight: 72 kg (159 lb)

Cycling career
- Sport: Cycling
- Current team: Alpecin–Premier Tech
- Disciplines: Cyclo-cross; Road
- Role: Rider

Amateur team
- 2020: WAC Team Hoboken

Professional teams
- 2020–2023: IKO–Crelan (cyclo-cross)
- 2021–2025: Alpecin–Fenix Development Team
- 2026–: Alpecin–Premier Tech
Medal record
Men's cyclo-cross
Representing Belgium
World Championships
Silver medal – second place	2020 Dübendorf	Junior

Lennert Belmans (born 15 February 2002) is a Belgian cyclist, who currently rides UCI WorldTeam Alpecin–Premier Tech.
