= Radomír Šimůnek Sr. =

Czech cyclist (1962–2010)

- Šimůnek as world champiom in 1991

Personal information
- Born: 8 April 1962 (age 64) Plzeň, Czechoslovakia
- Died: 10 August 2010 (aged 48) Kamenice, Czech Republic

Cycling career
- Sport: Cycling
- Discipline: Cyclo-cross
- Role: Rider
Medal record
Representing Czech Republic
Men's cyclo-cross
World Championships
Gold medal – first place	1991 Gieten	Elite Race

Radomír Šimůnek Sr. (Czech pronunciation: [ˈradomiːr ˈʃɪmuːnɛk], 8 April 1962 in Plzeň – 10 August 2010 in Kamenice) was a Czech racing cyclist who mainly participated in cyclo-cross. Šimůnek's son, Radomír Šimůnek Jr. is also a cyclo-cross cyclist.

During the Czech communist era he was a two time amateur World Champion, but was unable to become a professional cyclist. The earnings he garnered from international matches in Belgium and the Netherlands were paid to the Czechoslovakia Cycling Union and Šimůnek did not receive his winnings. The political change in Eastern Europe in 1989 and 1990 finally allowed him to become a professional, before he won the World title at the 1991 World Championships in Gieten.

In 1992 he was sentenced to 18 months in prison for causing a traffic accident that killed three people. He received a presidential pardon four months into his sentence.

== Honours ==
1980
1st UCI World Junior Championships
1982
2nd UCI Amateur World Championships
1983
1st UCI Amateur World Championships
1984
1st UCI Amateur World Championships
1st in Gieten
1985
1st in Rome
1989
2nd UCI Amateur World Championships
1990
1st in Rome
1st in Steinmaur
1st in Valkenswaard
1st in Zarautz
1st in Koksijde
1991
1st UCI World Championships
1st National Championships
1st in Plzeň
1st in Valkenswaard
1st in Zillebeke
1992
1st National Championships
1994
1st in Milan
1st in Plzeň
1st in Schulteiss-Cup
1996
1st in Hlinsko
3rd National Championships
1997
1st National Championships
1st in Hlinsko
1st in Kolín
1998
1st National Championships
1st in Magstadt
1999
1st in Olomouc
3rd National Championships
2000
2nd National Championships
