= Kamenice (Prague-East District) =

- Municipality
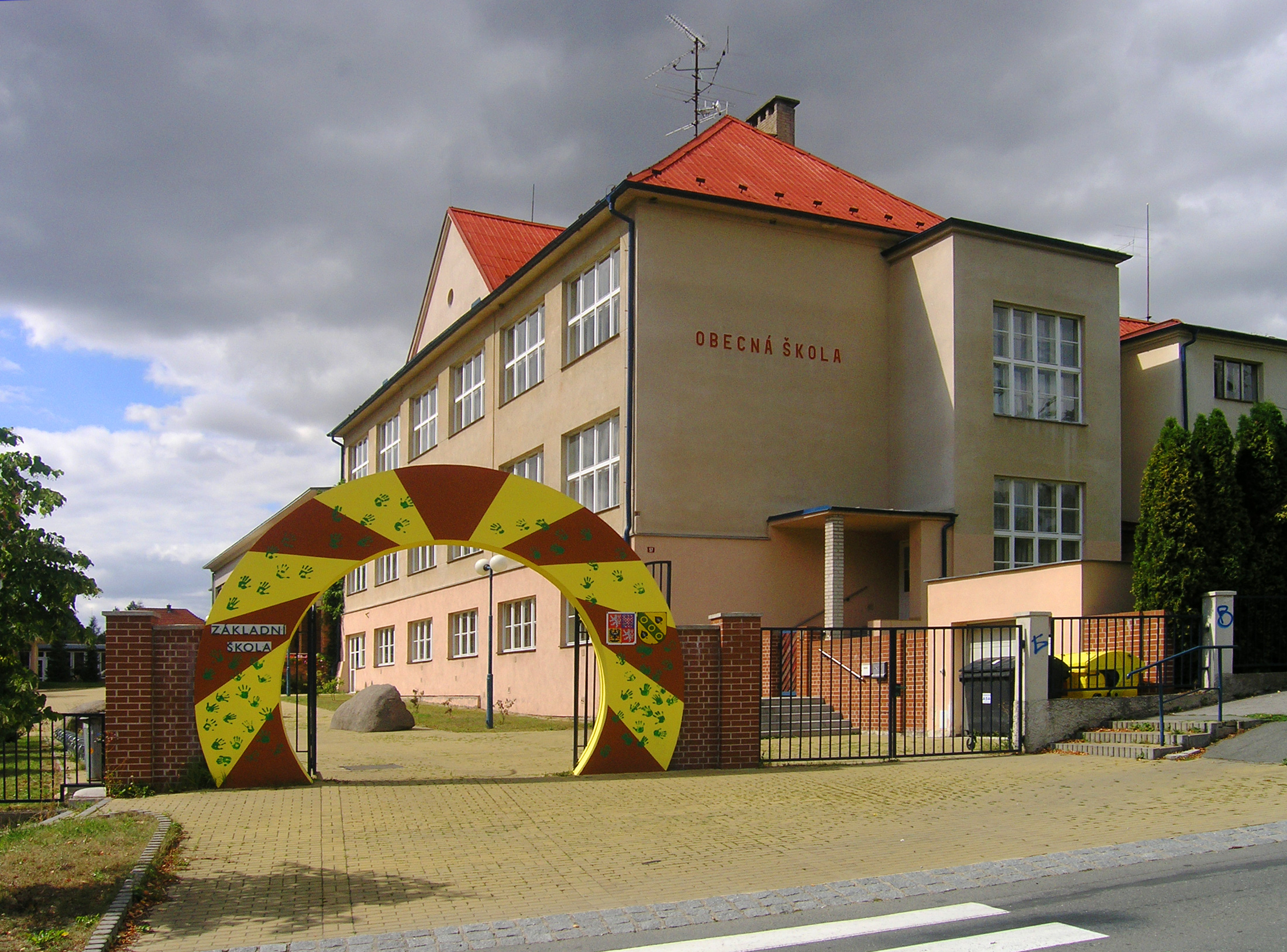
- Primary school

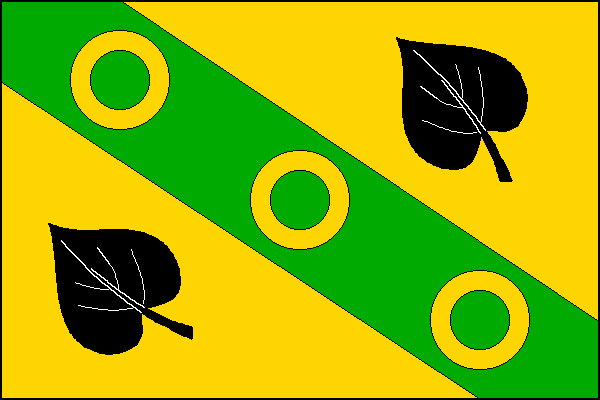
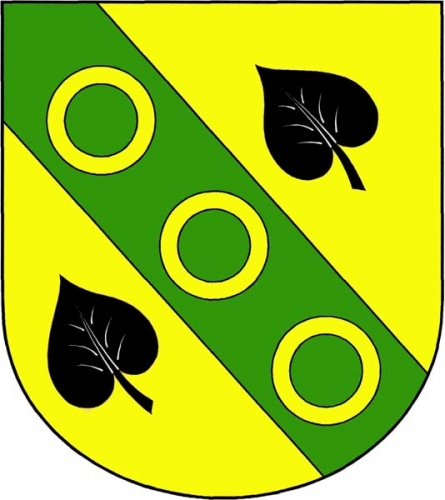
- Flag Coat of arms

- Location in the Czech Republic
- Coordinates: 49°54′6″N 14°34′57″E
- Country: Czech Republic
- Region: Central Bohemian
- District: Prague-East
- First mentioned: 1266

Area
  - Total: 17.38 km^{2} (6.71 sq mi)
- Elevation: 368 m (1,207 ft)

Population (2026-01-01)
  - Total: 5,307
  - Density: 305.4/km^{2} (790.9/sq mi)
- Time zone: UTC+1 (CET)
  - Summer (DST): UTC+2 (CEST)
- Postal code: 251 68
- Website: www.obeckamenice.cz

Kamenice (Czech pronunciation: [ˈkamɛɲɪtsɛ]) is a municipality and village in Prague-East District in the Central Bohemian Region of the Czech Republic. It has about 5,300 inhabitants, making it one of the most populous Czech municipalities without the town status.

== Administrative division ==
Kamenice consists of ten municipal parts (in brackets population according to the 2021 census):

- Kamenice (1,279)
- Ládeves (45)
- Ládví (832)
- Nová Hospoda (699)
- Olešovice (695)
- Skuheř (144)
- Štiřín (89)
- Struhařov (368)
- Těptín (665)
- Všedobrovice (182)

== Etymology ==
The name was transferred to the settlement from the local stream, which was called Kamenice.

== Geography ==
Kamenice is located about 15 kilometres (9 mi) southeast of Prague. It lies in the Benešov Uplands. The highest point is the hill Vlková at 521 m (1,709 ft) above sea level. The stream Kamenický potok flows through the municipality and supplies several fishponds.

== History ==
The first written mention of Kamenice is from 1266, when there was a fortress. The village was owned by various noblemen until 1763, including the Lobkowicz family and Albrecht von Wallenstein. From 1763 until the establishment of an independent municipality, Kamenice was a property of Prague archbishops. They had rebuilt the local manor house into a castle, which served as their summer residence.

In 1820, the Ringhoffer family started a business in the territory, and the agricultural village began to be industrialised. František Ringhoffer purchased the Kamenice Castle in 1860 and the nearby Štiřín Castle in 1870, and had reconstructed both of them. Properties of the Ringhoffer family were confiscated in 1945.

== Demographics ==
Kamenice is one of the most populous municipalities without town status in the Czech Republic. It belongs among the fastest growing municipalities in the country in the 21st century.

Historical population

| Year | Pop. | ±% |
|---|---|---|
| 1869 | 1,239 | — |
| 1880 | 1,294 | +4.4% |
| 1890 | 1,265 | −2.2% |
| 1900 | 1,417 | +12.0% |
| 1910 | 1,487 | +4.9% |

| Year | Pop. | ±% |
|---|---|---|
| 1921 | 1,459 | −1.9% |
| 1930 | 1,275 | −12.6% |
| 1950 | 1,444 | +13.3% |
| 1961 | 1,633 | +13.1% |
| 1970 | 1,775 | +8.7% |

| Year | Pop. | ±% |
|---|---|---|
| 1980 | 2,031 | +14.4% |
| 1991 | 2,261 | +11.3% |
| 2001 | 2,844 | +25.8% |
| 2011 | 4,233 | +48.8% |
| 2021 | 4,998 | +18.1% |

Source: Censuses

== Transport ==
There are no railways or major roads passing through the municipality.

== Sights ==
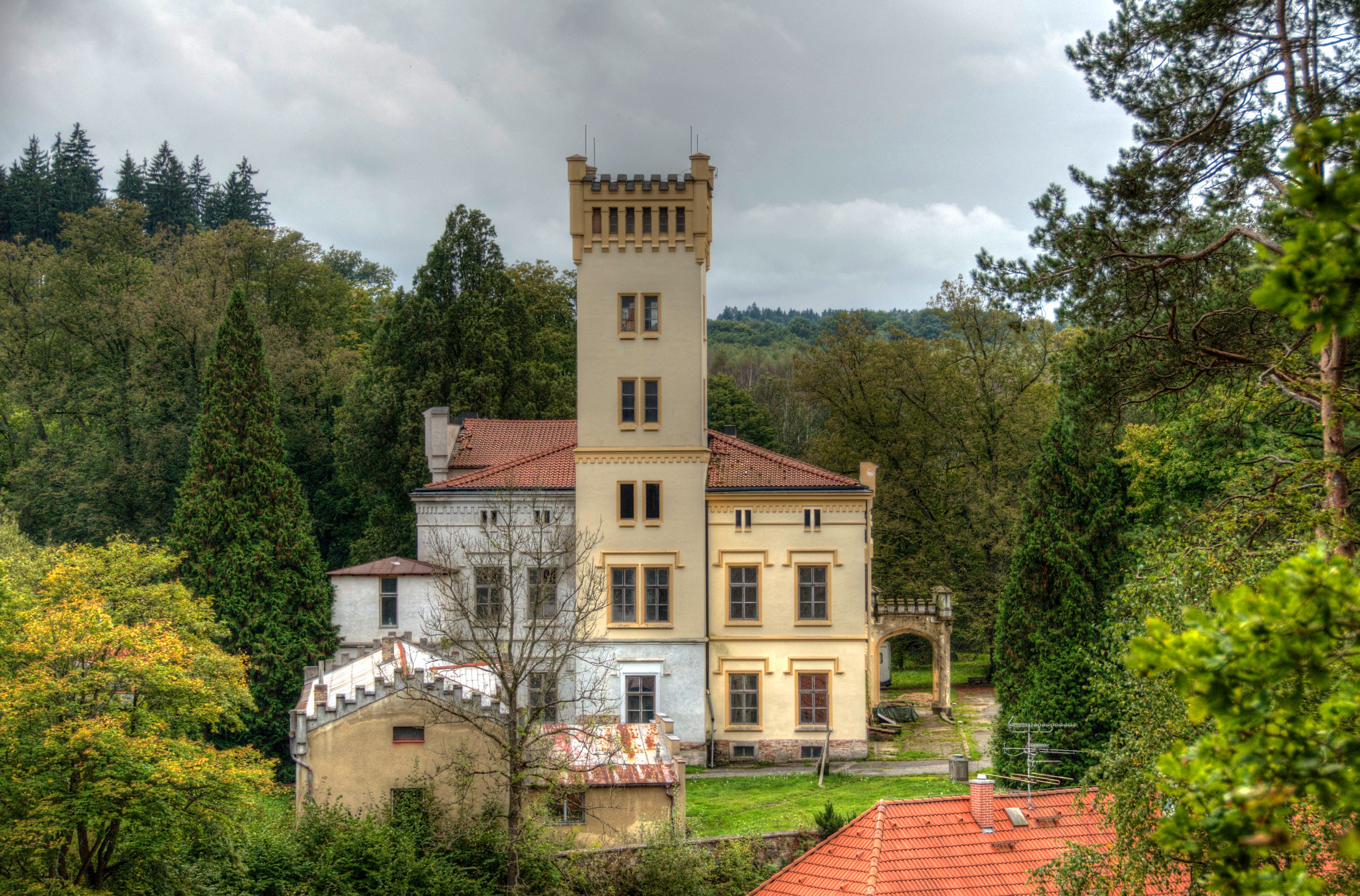
Kamenice Castle

The Kamenice Castle was rebuilt in the English neo-Gothic style in 1875–1880 by the architect Jiří Stibral. Today it is privately owned and inaccessible. Next to the castle is located the Church of Saint Francis of Assisi. The originally early Gothic church was rebuilt in 1797 and modified into its current form in 1898.

The Štiřín Castle is a Baroque castle in the village of Štiřín. The original fortress was rebuilt into the castle at the end of the 18th century, and a castle park was founded. It was reconstructed by Jiří Stibral in 1900–1905. Today, the castle is used as a hotel and restaurant, and part of the park serves as a golf course.

== Notable people ==
- Che Guevara (1928–1967), Argentine revolutionary; lived in Ládví in 1966
