= Ondrej Glajza (cyclist, born 1994) =

Slovak cyclo-cross cyclist

Personal information
- Born: 17 July 1994 (age 32) Bratislava, Slovakia

Cycling career
- Sport: Cycling
- Disciplines: Cyclo-cross; Mountain biking
- Role: Rider

Ondrej Glajza (born 17 July 1994) is a Slovak cyclo-cross cyclist. He competed in the men's under-23 event at the 2016 UCI Cyclo-cross World Championships in Heusden-Zolder.

== Major results ==
=== Cyclo-cross ===
2010–2011
1st National Junior Championships
2011–2012
1st National Junior Championships
2014–2015
2nd National Championships
2nd International Cyclocross Marikovská Dolina
2015–2016
1st Tage des Querfeldeinsports (Day of Cyclocross)
2nd National Championships
2nd Cyclo-cross International Podbrezova
2016–2017
3rd National Championships
2017–2018
2nd Tage des Querfeldeinsports (Day of Cyclocross)
2nd GP Kosice
2nd GP Poprad
2018–2019
1st National Championships
2nd Grand Prix Topoľčianky
2nd Grand Prix Kosice
2nd Grand Prix Podbrezová
3rd Grand Prix Trnava
2020–2021
3rd National Championships
3rd Grand Prix Podbrezova

=== MTB ===
2012
1st National Junior XCO Championships
2015
3rd National XCE Championships
2016
1st National XCO Championships
2nd National XCE Championships
