= Roland Liboton =

Belgian cyclist

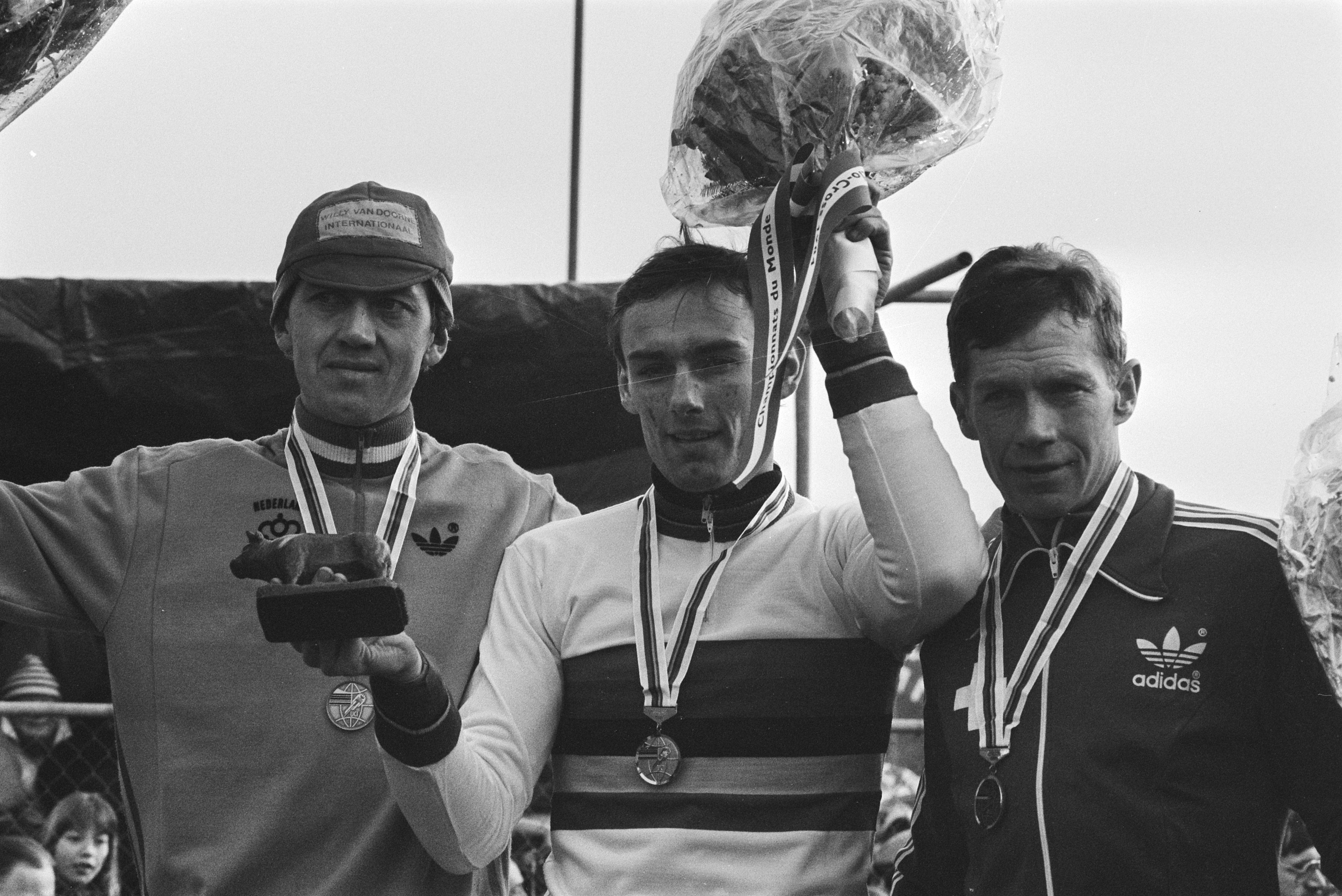

Personal information
- Born: 6 March 1957 (age 69) Leuven, Belgium

Cycling career
- Sport: Cycling
- Disciplines: Cyclo-cross; Road
- Role: Rider

Professional teams
- 1979–1980: Marc Zeep Savon–Superia
- 1981–1982: Vermeer Thijs
- 1982–1987: Guerciotti
- 1988–1989: AD Renting–Mini-Flat–Enerday
- 1990: Flanders–Santin
- 1990–1991: IOC–Tulip Computers
- 1992: Rocket Productions

Major wins
- Cyclo-cross World Championships (1980, 1982, 1983, 1984) National Championships (1980–1989)
Medal record
Representing Belgium
Men's cyclo-cross
World Championships
Gold medal – first place	1980 Wetzikon	Elite race
Gold medal – first place	1982 Lanarvily	Elite race
Gold medal – first place	1983 Birmingham	Elite race
Gold medal – first place	1984 Oss	Elite race
Silver medal – second place	1981 Tolosa	Elite race

Roland Liboton (born 6 March 1957) is a Belgian former cyclo-cross racer. Liboton won the UCI Cyclo-cross World Championships in 1980, 1982, 1983, and 1984, was the Belgian national champion for a record of ten successive years from 1980 to 1989. He also won the Superprestige in 1985, 1986 and 1988. In total, Liboton won 65 major cyclo-cross races.

Liboton also occasionally competed in road races, having ridden in the 1981 Tour de France. He retired from professional competition in 1992.

In 2002, Roland Liboton was introduced in the UCI Cycling Hall of Fame

Liboton became an honorary citizen of Aarschot, Belgium in 2023.

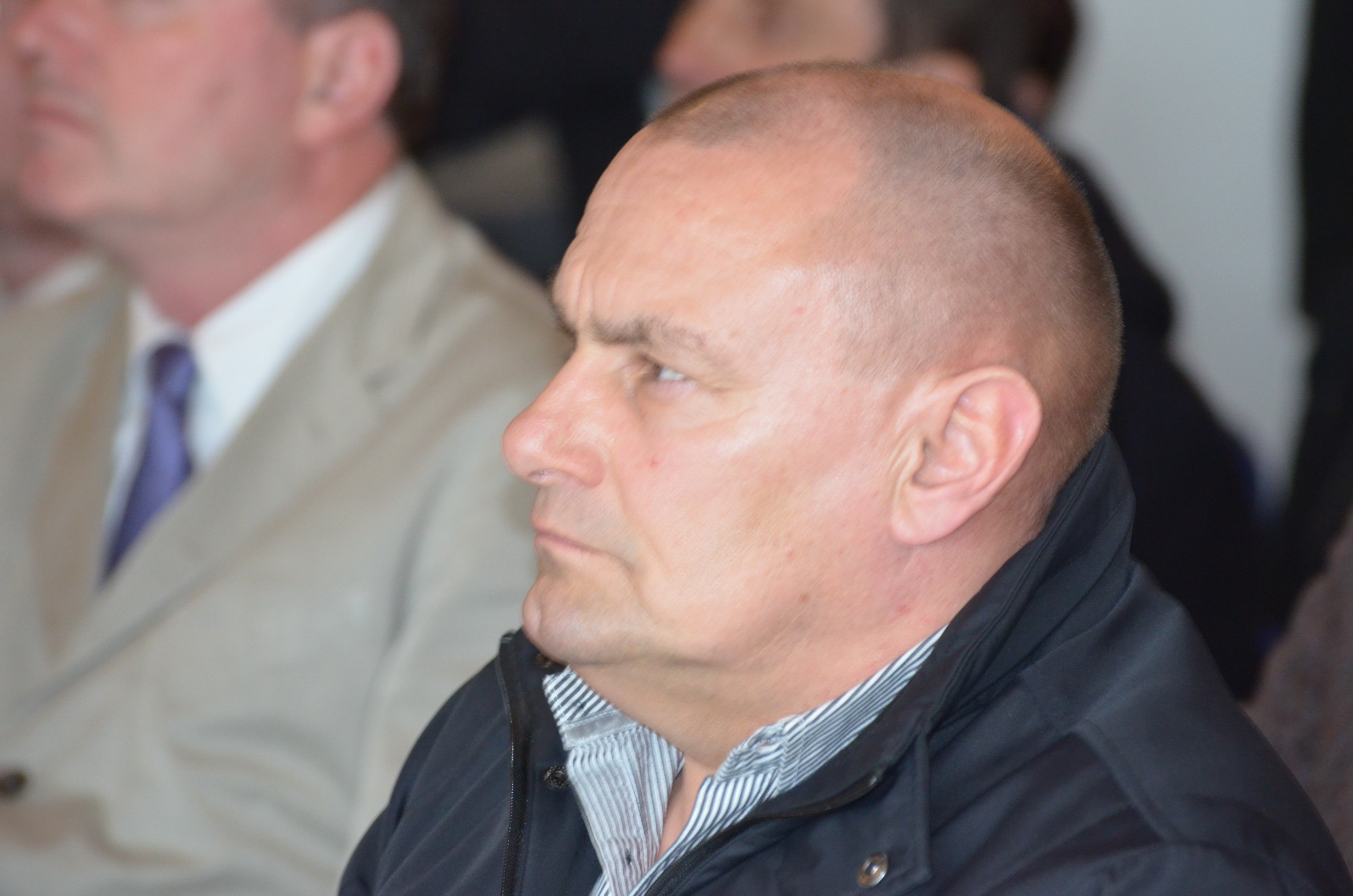
Roland Liboton in 2013

== Major results ==
=== Cyclo-cross ===
1975–1976
1st National Junior Championships
1977–1978
1st UCI World Amateur Championships
1st National Amateur Championships
1st Overijse II
2nd Overijse I
1978–1979
2nd Overijse I
1979–1980
1st UCI World Championships
1st National Championships
1st Overijse II
2nd Overijse I
3rd Diegem
1980–1981
1st National Championships
1st Overijse I
1st Overijse II
1st Niel
1st Diegem
1st Zürich-Waid
2nd UCI World Championships
2nd Steinmaur
3rd Gavere
1981–1982
1st UCI World Championships
1st National Championships
1st Overijse I
1st Overijse II
2nd Zürich-Waid
3rd Diegem
1982–1983
1st UCI World Championships
1st National Championships
Superprestige

1st Diegem
1st Overijse

1st Niel
1st Overijse
2nd Wetzikon
3rd Koksijde
1983–1984
1st UCI World Championships
1st National Championships
Superprestige

1st Valkenswaard
1st Overijse
1st Diegem
1st Zillebeke
1st Gavere
1st Overijse

1st Niel
1st Steinmaur
1st Wetzikon
1984–1985
1st National Championships
1st Overall Superprestige

1st Roma
1st Oss
1st Diegem
2nd Zürich-Waid
2nd Valkenswaard

1st Overijse
1985–1986
1st National Championships
1st Overall Superprestige

1st Overijse
1st Diegem
2nd Oss
2nd Zillebeke
2nd Gavere
3rd Valkenswaard

1st Gieten
1st Niel
1st Koksijde
1st Loenhout
1986–1987
1st National Championships
Superprestige

1st Diegem
3rd Overijse

1st Koksijde
1st Overijse
2nd Niel
1987–1988
1st National Championships
1st Overall Superprestige

1st Zarautz
1st Roma
1st Overijse
1st Diegem
1st Gavere
1st Wetzikon
1st Zillebeke
2nd Oss

1st Gieten
1st Niel
1988–1989
1st National Championships
Superprestige

1st Diegem

1st Loenhout
2nd Niel
1989–1990
2nd National Championships
