= Rigobert Matt =

German cyclist

Personal information
- Full name: Rigobert Matt
- Born: 10 May 1963 (age 63) Germany

Cycling career
- Sport: Cycling
- Current team: Retired
- Discipline: Road
- Role: Rider

Professional teams
- 1985: Santini
- 1986: Fangio–Lois–Mavic
- 1987: AD Renting–Fangio–IOC–MBK

Rigobert Matt (born 10 May 1963) is a German former professional racing cyclist.

In 1981 Matt won the UCI Cyclo-cross World Championships – Junior men's race. He rode in the 1985 Giro d'Italia where he did not finish after pulling out on stage 18. In the Road race at the 1986 UCI Road World Championships Matt was in the early break he stayed away with Alex Stieda till the seventh lap where they were caught, he eventually pulled out of the race after nine laps.

== Major results ==
1981
1st UCI Junior Cyclo-cross World Championships
1986
1st Stage 5b Four Days of Dunkirk

=== Grand Tour result ===
Grand Tour	1985
Vuelta a España	–
Giro d'Italia	DNF
Tour de France	–
