= Gilles Blaser =

Swiss cyclist

Personal information
- Born: 16 December 1952 (age 73) Genthod, Switzerland

Cycling career
- Sport: Cycling
- Disciplines: Cyclo-cross; Road
- Role: Rider

Professional teams
- 1977: Jelmoli–Hugo Koblet rad
- 1979: Miko–Mercier–Vivagel
- 1982: Kotter's–Bibione
Medal record
Representing Switzerland
World Championships
Silver medal – second place	1979 Saccolongo	Elite race
Silver medal – second place	1978 Amorebieta	Amateur race

Gilles Blaser (born 16 December 1952) is a Swiss former racing cyclist. He most notably won a silver medal in the elite race at the 1979 UCI Cyclo-cross World Championships and the Ziklokross Igorre in 1982. He also finished second to Albert Zweifel at the Swiss National Cyclo-cross Championships in 1984 and 1985.
