= Reinier Groenendaal =

Dutch cyclist

Reinier Groenendaal (Sint-Michielsgestel, 24 April 1951) is a former professional Dutch cyclo-crosser, whose career lasted from 1978 to 1992.

He won the Dutch National Cyclo-cross Championship in 1985 (beating archrival Hennie Stamsnijder on a frozen, snowy track in Gieten), and in 1984 and 1985, finished second and third, respectively, in the Superprestige competition. He is the father of former cyclo-crosser and world champion Richard Groenendaal.
