= Gieten =

- Village
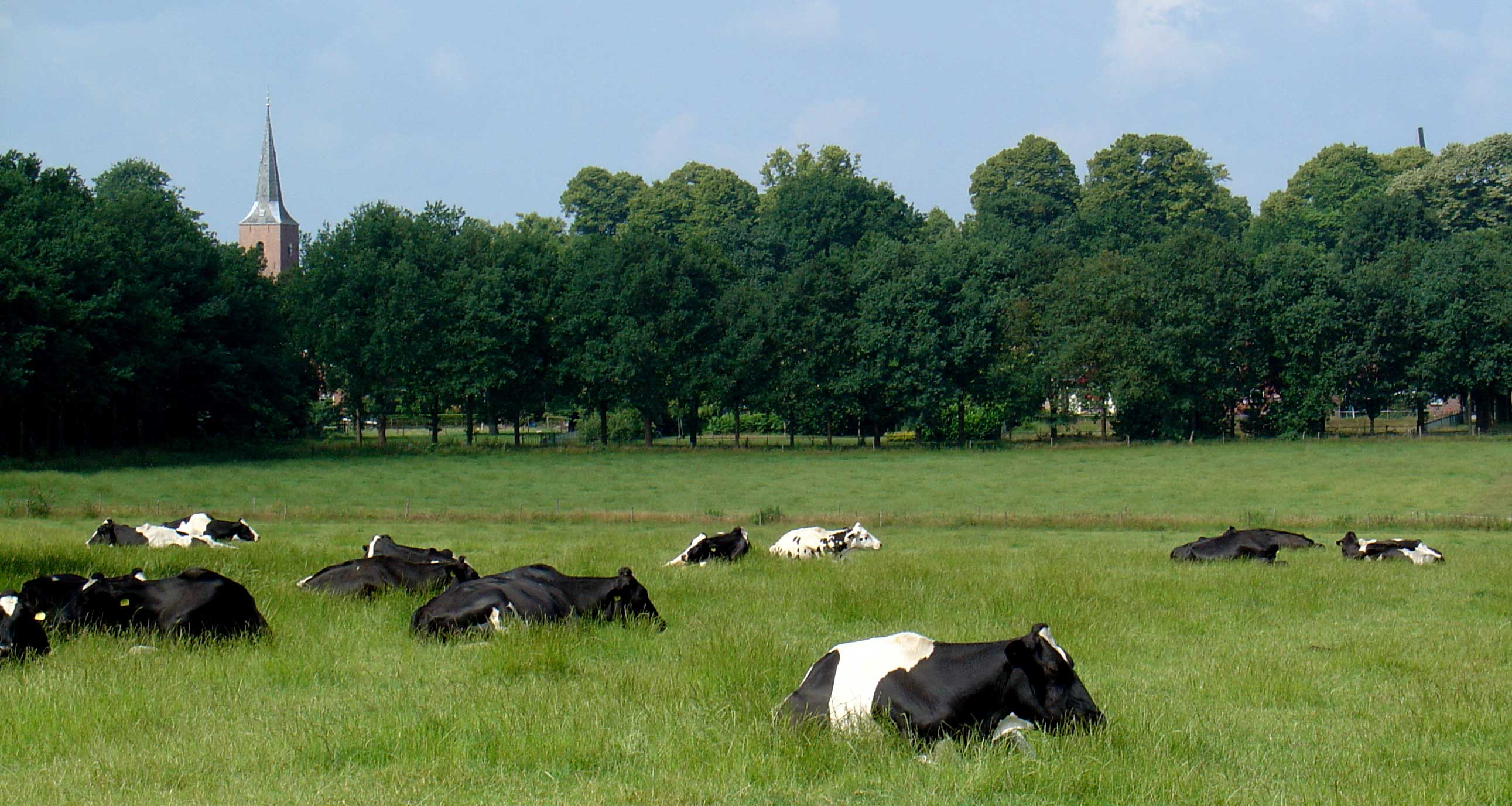
- Zicht op Gieten vanaf de Hondsrugweg

- Flag Coat of arms

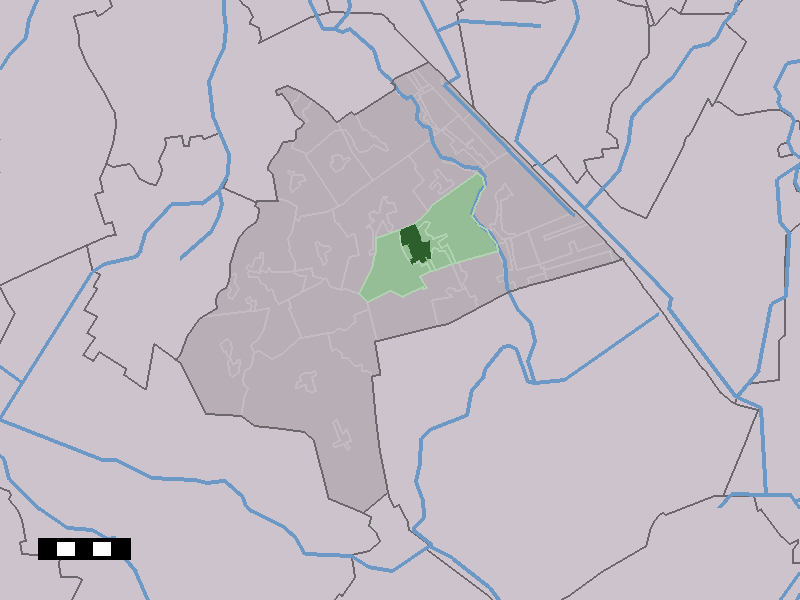
- The village centre (dark green) and the statistical district (light green) of Gieten in the municipality of Aa en Hunze.

- Location in the Netherlands Gieten (Netherlands)
- Coordinates: 53°0′19″N 6°45′47″E
- Country: Netherlands
- Province: Drenthe
- Municipality: Aa en Hunze

Area
  - Total: 24.74 km^{2} (9.55 sq mi)
- Elevation: 16 m (52 ft)

Population (2021)
  - Total: 5,030
  - Density: 203/km^{2} (527/sq mi)
- Time zone: UTC+1 (CET)
  - Summer (DST): UTC+2 (CEST)
- Postal code: 9461
- Dialing code: 0592

Gieten (Dutch pronunciation: [ˈɣitə(n)]) is a village in the Dutch province of Drenthe. It is a part of the municipality of Aa en Hunze, and lies about 14 km east of Assen.

== History ==
The village was first mentioned in 1223 as Geten. The etymology is unclear. Gieten is an esdorp which developed in the Early Middle Ages on the Hondsrug as a satellite of Anloo. The village started to developed where the road from Groningen to Coevorden intersected with a road to Assen. The former village Bonnen was located to the east and contained the havezate Entinge from 1648 until its demolition in 1768.

The Dutch Reformed Church dates from at least 1302. In 1626, it was heavily damaged during the Dutch Revolt, and rebuilt. The tower was built in 1804 as a replacement of a 17th-century tower.

Gieten was home to 464 people 1840. Between 1905 and 1947, a railway station on the Gasselternijveen to Assen railway line was located in Gieten. The building was demolished in 1969.

Gieten was a separate municipality until 1998, when it became a part of Aa en Hunze.

== Sports ==
The Superprestige Gieten was a cyclo-cross race held in Gieten, Netherlands, which was part of the Superprestige.

== Gallery ==
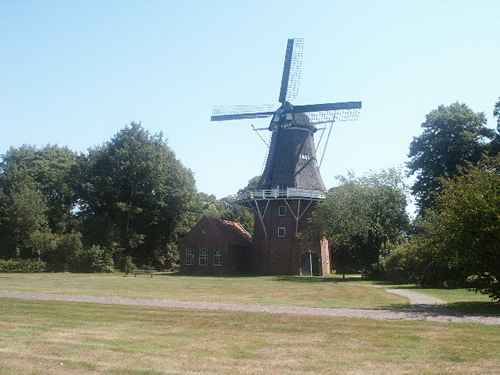
Hazewind windmill

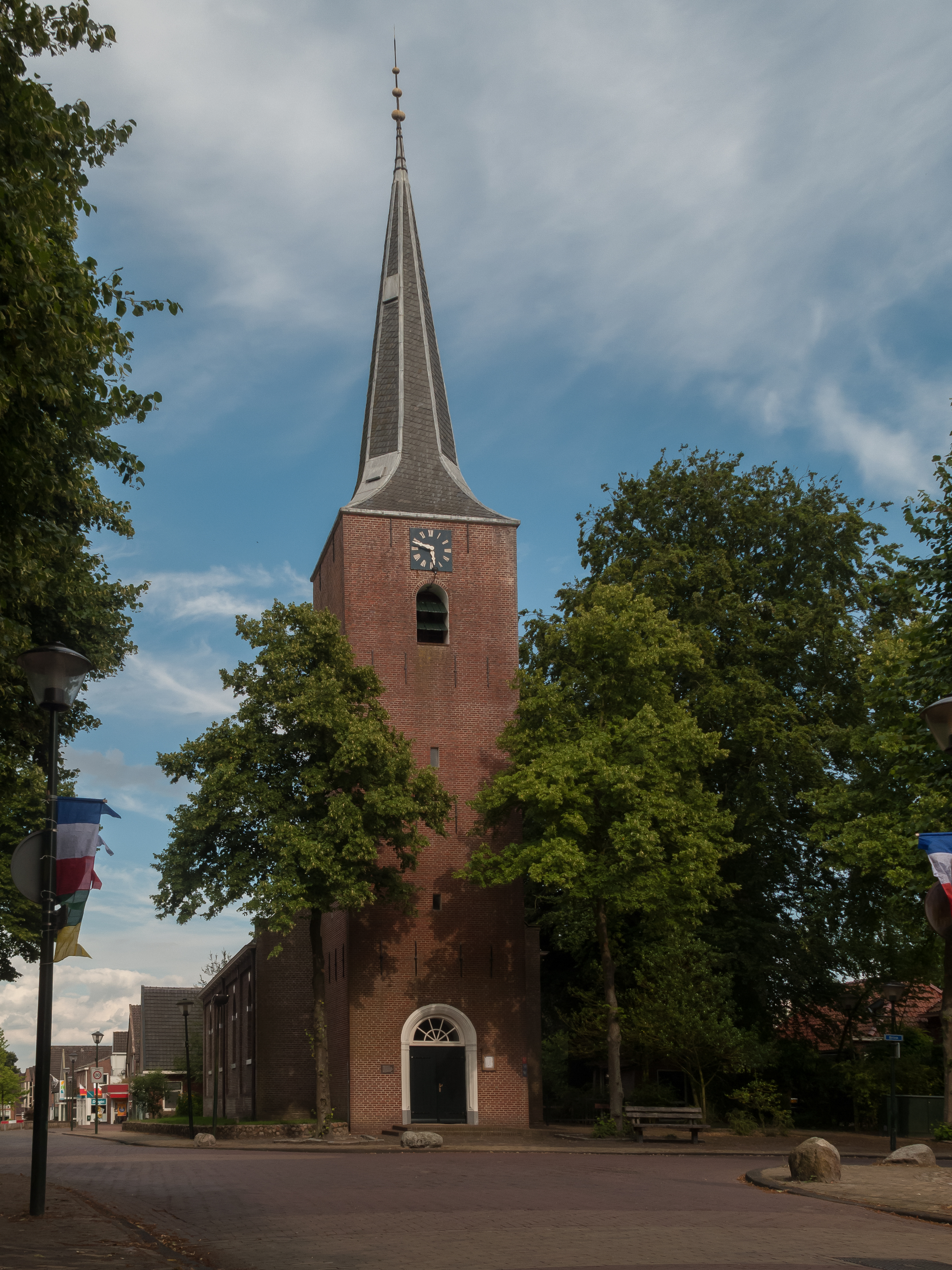
Reformed church

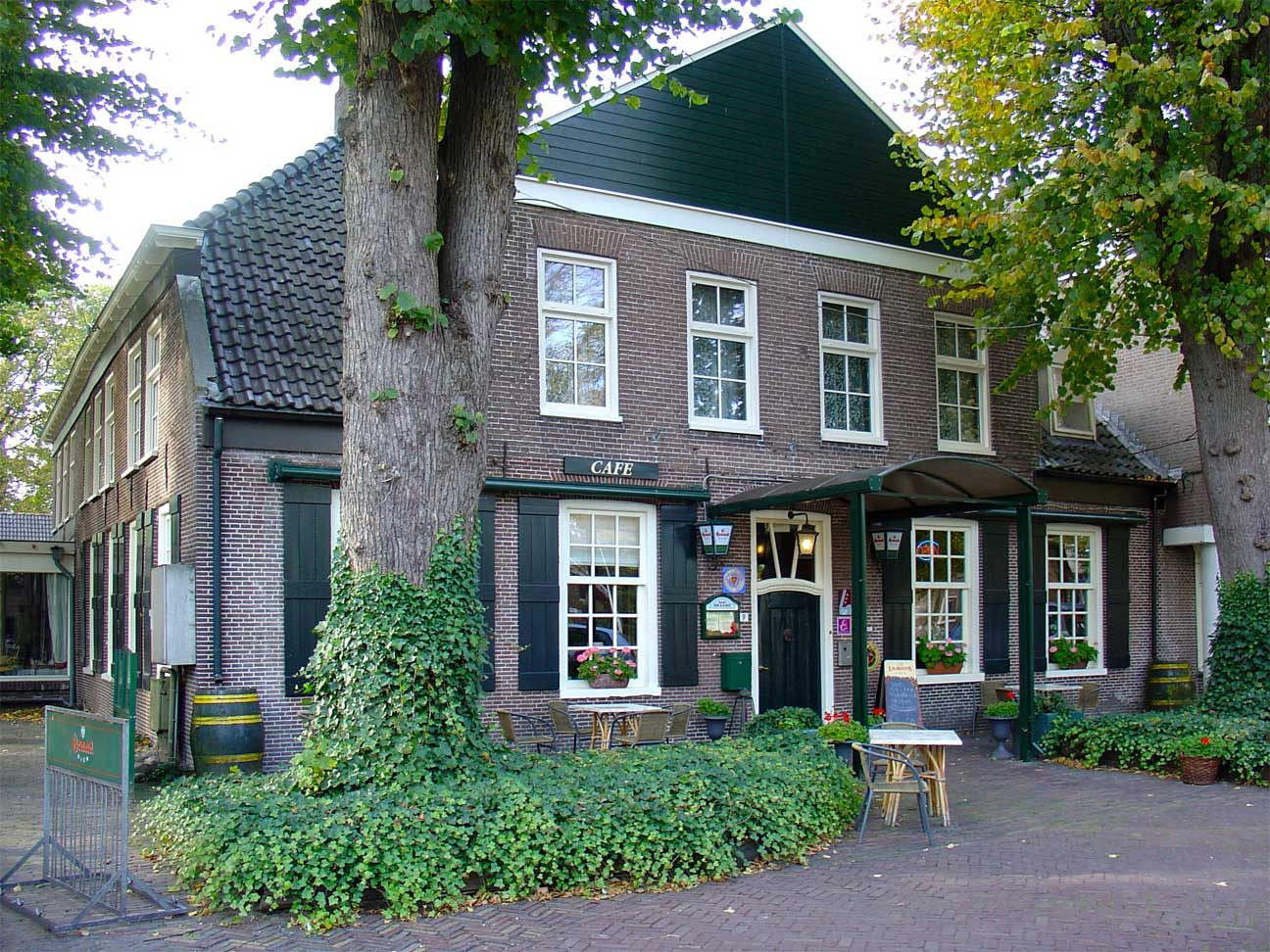
Hotel in Gieten

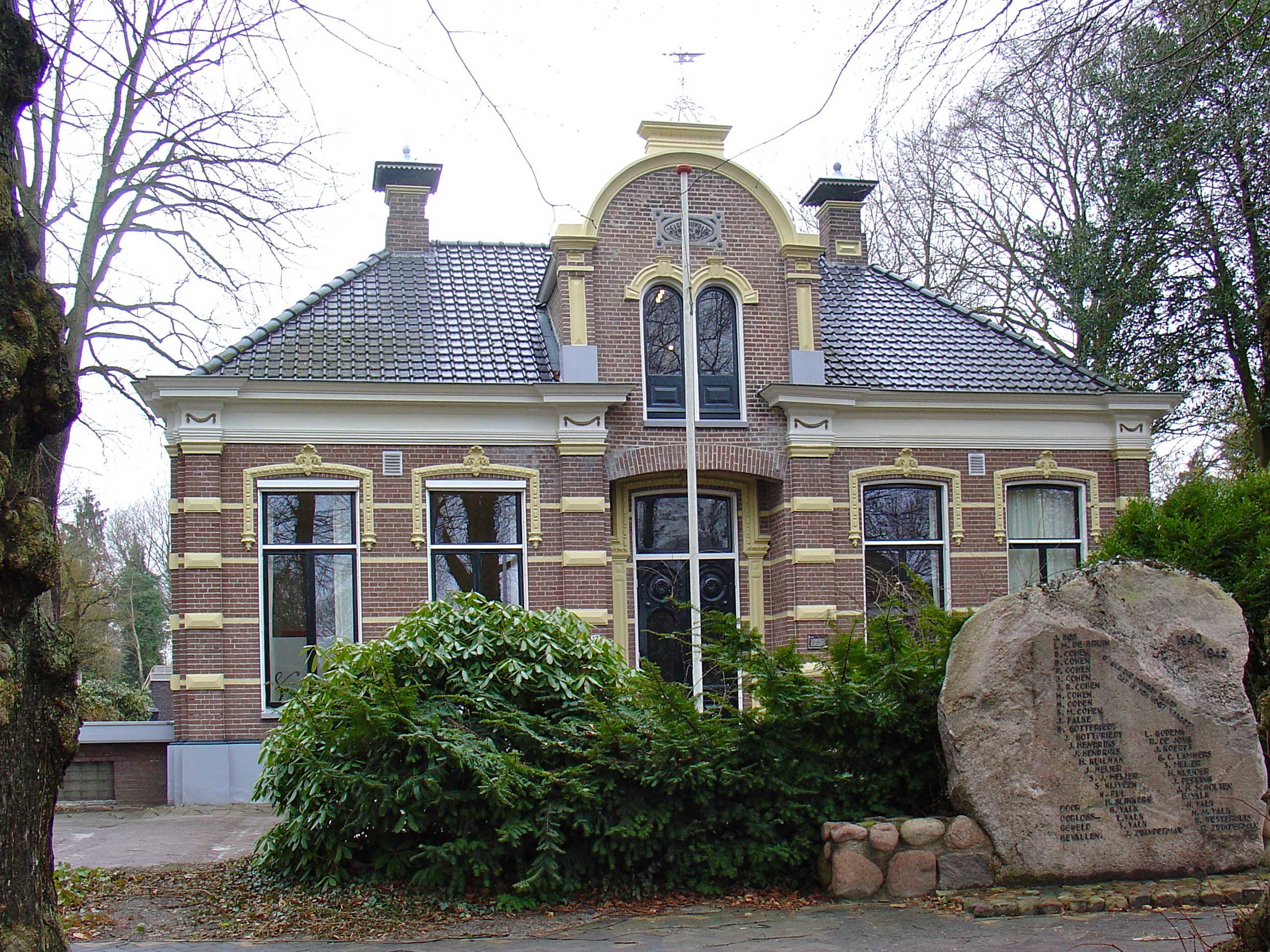
Former town hall
