= Klaus-Peter Thaler =

German cyclist

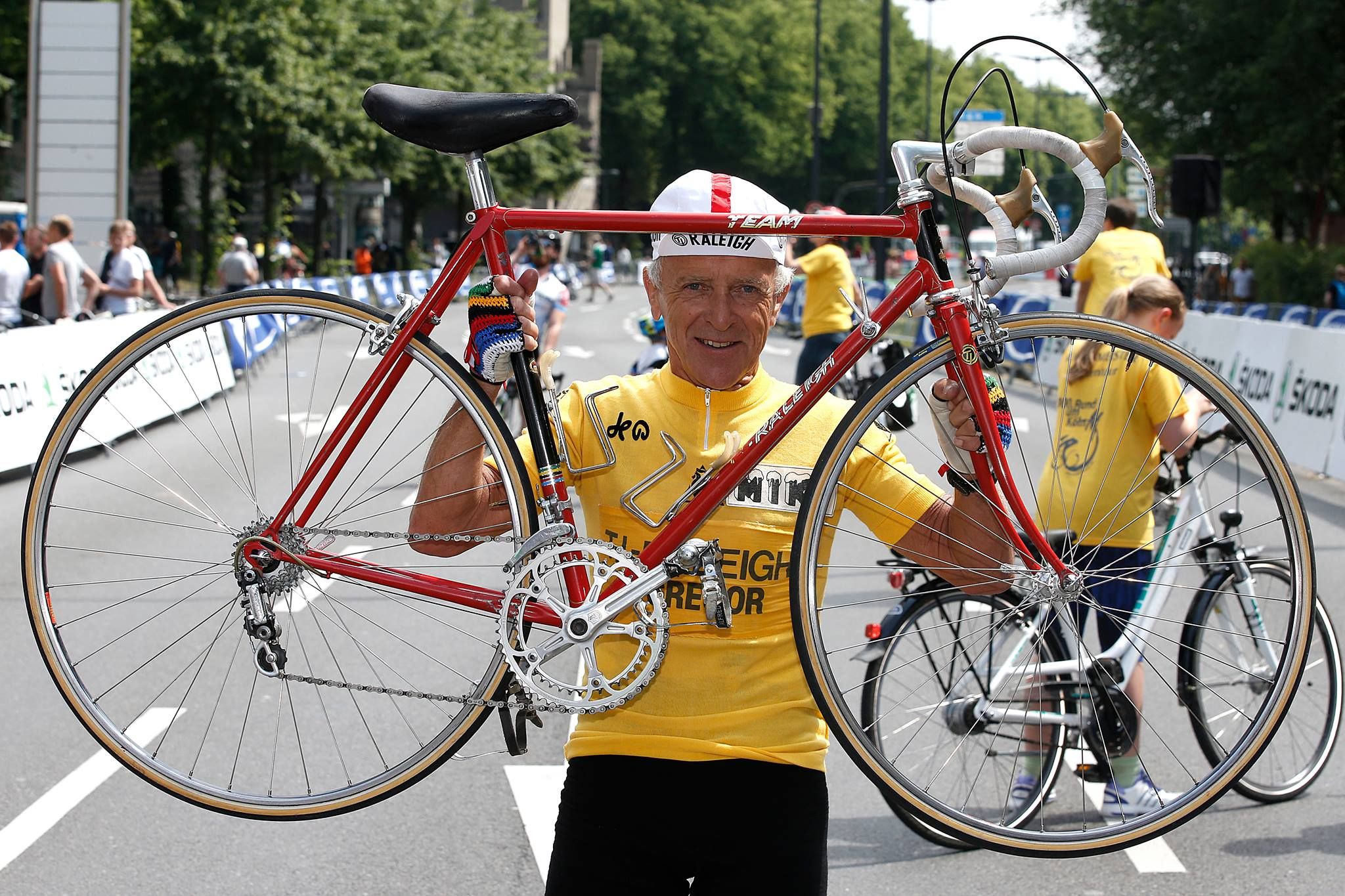
- Klaus-Peter Thaler (2016)

Personal information
- Full name: Klaus-Peter Thaler
- Born: 14 May 1949 (age 77) Eckmannshausen, Germany

Cycling career
- Sport: Cycling
- Current team: Retired
- Disciplines: Road, Cyclo-cross
- Role: Rider

Professional teams
- 1977: Teka
- 1978-1979: TI–Raleigh
- 1980: Teka
- 1981: Puch-Wolber
- 1982: Puch-Eorotex
- 1983-1988: Individual sponsor

Major wins
- World Cyclo Cross Championships (1985, 1987); West German cyclo-cross champion (1976,1977,1978,1979,1982,1986,1987 &1988)
Medal record
Representing Germany
Men's cyclo-cross
World Championships
Gold medal – first place	1985 Münich	Elite Men's Race
Gold medal – first place	1987 Mladá Boleslav	Elite Men's Race
Silver medal – second place	1980 Wetzikon	Elite Men's Race
Bronze medal – third place	1978 Amorebieta-Etxano	Elite Men's Race
Bronze medal – third place	1983 Birmingham	Elite Men's Race

Klaus-Peter Thaler (born 14 May 1949 in Eckmannshausen, North Rhine-Westphalia) is a former professional cyclist whose career spanned from 1976 to 1988, he was successful in road-racing and cyclo-cross. He was world cyclo-cross champion twice as an amateur and twice as a professional and German champion eight times.

== Biography ==
Thaler studied at the University of Siegen and received a post-graduate degree as a middle school teacher for physical education and geography. From 1974-76 he attended the German Coaching Academy in Cologne, writing his diploma thesis under the guidance of Arnd Krüger. In 1976, Thaler entered the Olympic Games, in the road race. He finished in ninth place. He turned professional one year later.

In the 1978 Tour de France, Thaler led the race for two days, after his team won the team time trial.

Thaler organises the Tour of Hope bicycle charity ride, and was given the Pierre de Coubertin medal for that in 2005.

== Career achievements ==
=== Major results ===
- World Champion Cyclo-cross: 1985,1987
- German champion cyclo-cross: 1976,1977,1978,1979,1982,1986,1987,1988
- German cycling road champion for amateurs: 1976
- Vuelta a Andalucía 1977: Stage 1B
- Critérium du Dauphiné Libéré 1979: Stage 1
- Paris–Nice 1980: Stage 5

=== Tour de France results ===
- 1977 Tour de France: did not finish, won stage 9
- 1978 Tour de France: 35th place, won stage 3, wore the yellow jersey for 2 days
- 1979 Tour de France: 37th place
- 1980 Tour de France: 49th place
- 1981 Tour de France: 90th place
