= Vito Di Tano =

Italian cyclist (1954–2025)

Personal information
- Born: 23 September 1954 Monopoli, Italy
- Died: 5 February 2025 (aged 70) Fasano, Italy

Cycling career
- Sport: Cycling

Professional team
- 1978–1990: GS Guerciotti

Vito Di Tano (23 September 1954 – 5 February 2025) was an Italian cyclo-cross cyclist. He notably won the Amateur UCI Cyclo-cross World Championship in 1979 and 1986.

Di Tano died in Fasano, Italy on 5 February 2025, at the age of 70.
