= Henk Baars =

Dutch cyclo-cross cyclist (born 1960)

Personal information
- Born: 3 August 1960 (age 66) Diessen, Netherlands

Cycling career
- Sport: Cycling
- Current team: Retired
- Discipline: Cyclo-cross
- Role: Rider
Medal record
Representing Netherlands
Men's cyclo-cross
World Championships
Gold medal – first place	1990 Getxo	Elite Race

Henk Baars (born 3 August 1960) is a former professional Dutch cyclo-cross cyclist who was among the best Dutch cyclo-cross cyclists in the late 1980s to mid-1990s.

Baars’ greatest win was when he became World Champion on a Spanish course in Guecho in 1990. His win was unexpected at the time, as Adri van der Poel was the big favourite for the race. Other wins in his career included the Dutch national Mountainbike title in 1989 and Dutch national cyclo-cross champion in 1993. Baars now runs a sports and cycle business in Diessen.
