= Hennie Stamsnijder =

Dutch cyclist

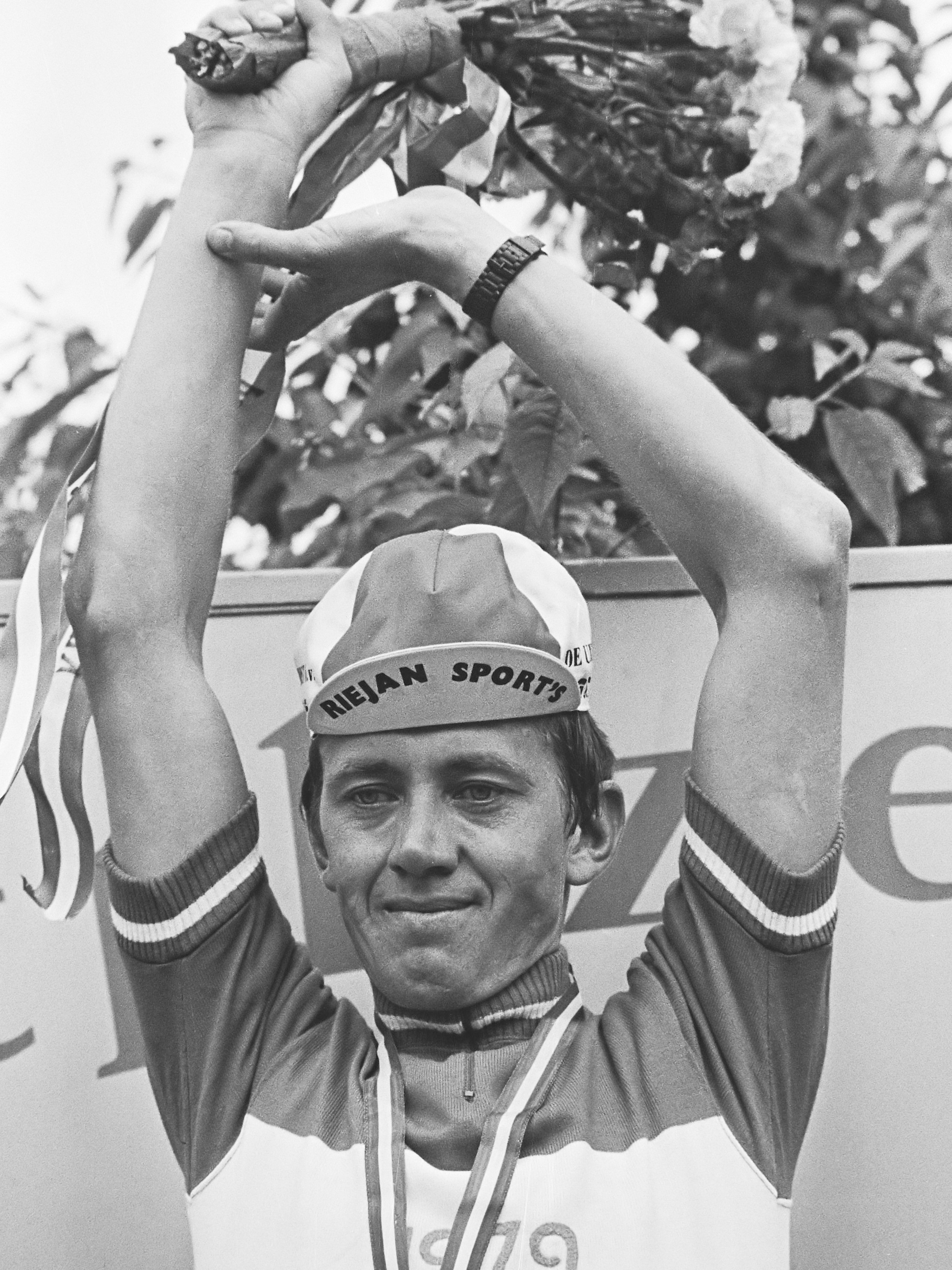

Personal information
- Full name: Hendrikus Johannes Maria Stamsnijder
- Born: 21 July 1954 (age 72) Enter, Netherlands

Cycling career
- Sport: Cycling
- Current team: Retired
- Discipline: Cyclo-cross
- Role: Rider

Amateur team
- 1975–1979: –

Professional teams
- 1980–1982: DAF trucks
- 1983–1986: Willy Van Doorne
- 1987–1989: PDM–Concorde

Major wins
- World Cyclo Cross Championships (1981); 4 wins Superprestige classification
Medal record
Representing Netherlands
Men's cyclo-cross
World Championships
| Gold medal – first place | 1981 Tolosa | Elite Men's Race |
| Silver medal – second place | 1984 Oss | Elite Men's Race |
| Bronze medal – third place | 1980 Wetzikon | Elite Men's Race |
| Bronze medal – third place | 1982 Lanarvily | Elite Men's Race |
| Bronze medal – third place | 1986 Lembeek | Elite Men's Race |

Hendrikus (Hennie) Johannes Maria Stamsnijder (born 21 July 1954 in Enter, Overijssel) is a Dutch former professional cyclo-cross and road racing cyclist.

Stamsnijder was military cyclo-cross world champion in 1975. In 1976 he took part in the Olympic Games. In 1979 he won the Essen cyclo-cross and the amateur Dutch road race championship. In 1980 he turned professional for DAF Trucks, finishing third in the cyclo-cross world championship.

Stamsnijder's greatest success was becoming cyclo-cross world champion in 1981 in Tolosa in the Basque Country. On a muddy course he left the Belgian Roland Liboton and the Swiss champion Albert Zweifel behind him to take the title. Stamsnijder was the first Dutch world cyclo-cross champion and that year he was named sportsman of the year.

Stamsnijder rode the Tour de France in 1980 and 1981, but it was cyclo-cross that brought his greatest victories, winning the Superprestige classification in 1983, 1984, 1987 and 1989 with 14 wins in Superprestige races.

In 1989 Stamsnijder ended his career when his son fell ill. He became the coach of the Dutch cyclo-cross team and is now a manager of Shimano sports marketing. His son, Tom Stamsnijder, was a professional cyclist too.
