= Albert Zweifel =

Swiss cyclist

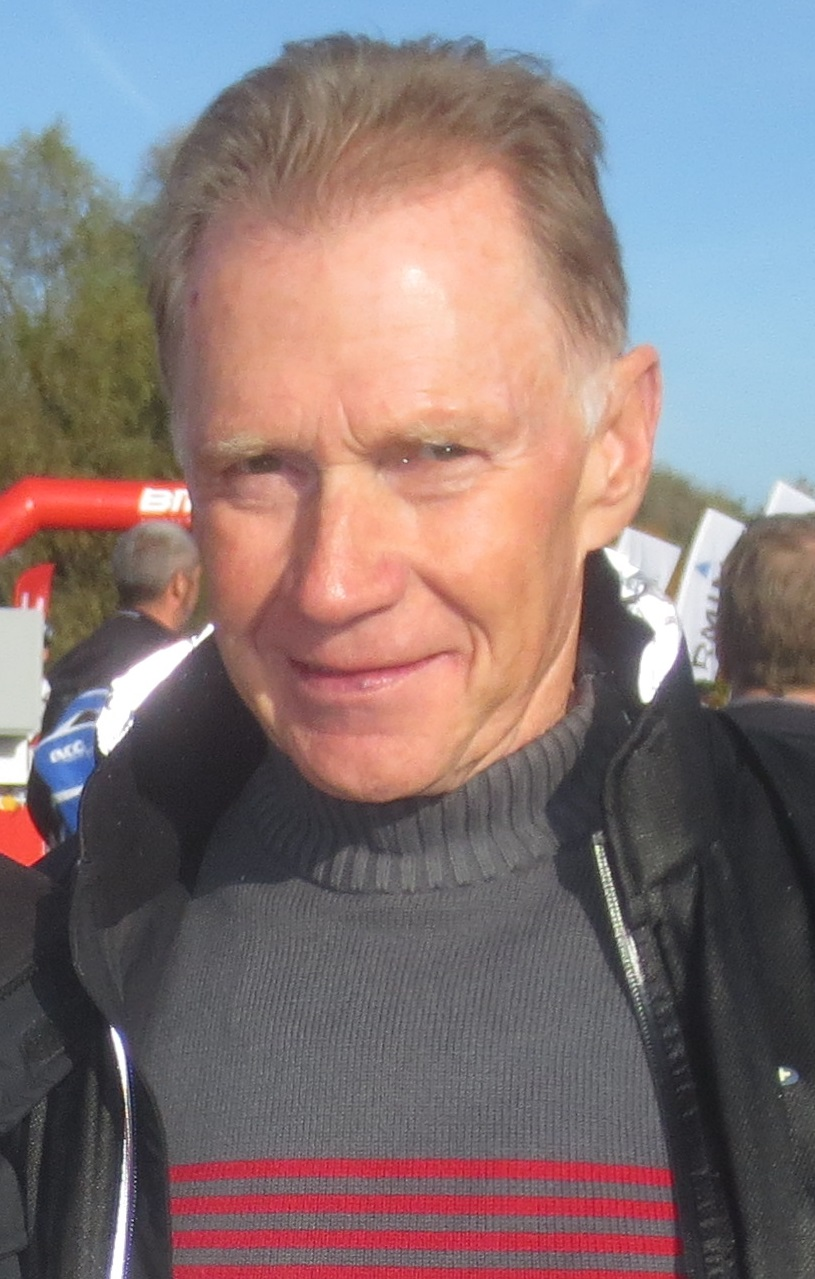
- Albert Zweifel (2014)

Personal information
- Born: 7 June 1949 (age 77) Rüti, Zurich, Switzerland

Cycling career
- Sport: Cycling
- Current team: Retired
- Disciplines: Cyclo-cross; Road
- Role: Rider

Professional teams
- 1973–1975: Möbel Märki–Bonanza
- 1973: Sonolor
- 1974: Furzi
- 1974: Willner–Birr–Brugg
- 1975: Filotex
- 1976: Känel–Colnago
- 1976–1979: Sempione–Mondia
- 1978–1979: Jelmoli
- 1978: Lejeune–BP
- 1979–1980: A.P.G.-S.G.A.
- 1980–1981: Ako Bank
- 1981: Sem–France Loire–Campagnolo
- 1982: Puch–Eorotex–Campagnolo
- 1982–1986: Möbel Märki
- 1984: Europ Decor–Boule d'Or
- 1986–1988: Sempione-Blacky
- 1988–1989: Bleiker
Medal record
Representing Switzerland
Men's cyclo-cross
World Championships
Gold medal – first place	1976 Chazay	Elite race
Gold medal – first place	1977 Hanover	Elite race
Gold medal – first place	1978 Amorebieta-Etxano	Elite race
Gold medal – first place	1979 Saccolongo	Elite race
Gold medal – first place	1986 Lembeek	Elite race
Silver medal – second place	1975 Melchnau	Elite race
Silver medal – second place	1982 Lanarvily	Elite race
Silver medal – second place	1983 Birmingham	Elite race
Bronze medal – third place	1981 Tolosa	Elite race
Bronze medal – third place	1984 Oss	Elite race

Albert Zweifel (born 7 June 1949) is a Swiss former professional cyclo-cross cyclist. Zweifel competed as a professional from 1973 to 1989, winning the UCI Cyclo-cross World Championships five times (1976, 1977, 1978, 1979, 1986). He was also the Swiss National Cyclo-cross Champion nine times. Zweifel dominated cyclo-cross in Switzerland in the 1970s as well as winning big international cyclo-cross races such as Aigle and Igorre.

He also competed in road races, having ridden in the 1981 Tour de France and the 1974 Giro d'Italia. He also finished in the top 10 overall four times in the Tour de Suisse.
