= Radovan Fořt =

Czech cyclist

Personal information
- Born: 14 February 1965 (age 61) Ústí nad Labem, Czechoslovakia

Cycling career
- Sport: Cycling

Radovan Fořt (born 14 February 1965) is a Czech cyclist. He competed in the men's cross-country mountain biking event at the 1996 Summer Olympics.
