= Peter Hric =

Slovak cyclist (1965–2025)

Personal information
- Born: 17 June 1965 Spišská Nová Ves, Czechoslovakia
- Died: 14 March 2025 (aged 59) Luxembourg
- Height: 1.72 m (5 ft 8 in)

Cycling career
- Sport: Cycling

Peter Hric (17 June 1965 – 14 March 2025) was a Slovak cyclist, who finished 30th in the men's cross-country mountain biking event at the 1996 Summer Olympics.

Hric began participating in cyclo-cross at 14 years old before pursuing road cycling and mountain biking. He won the bronze medal at the 1983 Junior World Championships and came in fourth at the 1989 World Championships. His best performance was at the 1993 European Mountain Bike Championships, where he won bronze. He participated in the 1996 Summer Olympics, but performed poorly due to puncturing a tire during his first lap.

After retiring from sport, Hric worked in the automotive industry. He died in Luxembourg on 14 March 2025 at the age of 59.
