= 2007 UCI Cyclo-cross World Championships – Men's elite race =

Men's Elite Cyclo-cross Race
2007 UCI Cyclo-cross World Championships
- Rainbow jersey

Race details
- Dates: January 28, 2007
- Stages: 1
- Winning time: 1h 05' 35"

Medalists
	Gold	Erwin Vervecken (BEL)
	Silver	Jonathan Page (USA)
	Bronze	Enrico Franzoi (ITA)

The 2007 UCI Cyclo-cross World Championships – Men's elite race was held on Sunday 28 January 2007 as a part of the 2007 UCI Cyclo-cross World Championships in Hooglede-Gits, Belgium.

== Summary ==
In an exciting world championships Gerben de Knegt was the first taking the lead and was booed by the 40,000 spectators. Top favourites Sven Nys and Bart Wellens took an early lead breaking away from the pack, but were set back by bad luck as they were brought down by a plastic block that was touched by a television motorcycle. Both continued the race, but had to chase the leaders from behind. Due to the incident defending champion Erwin Vervecken was the only leader with a small gap to the rest of the peloton. Vervecken fell as well however, as he was trying to climb up a hill and was overtaken by Richard Groenendaal who took the initiative and looked secure to win his second world title, with the big favourites way behind. Groenendaal however also crashed and Italian champion Enrico Franzoi together with Jonathan Page were in the lead. Vervecken in the meanwhile was slightly behind the two and came back. Franzoi couldn't keep up driving through the sand and was set back and had to fight for his bronze medal. In the final lap both leaders tried to create a gap several times, but were taken back by the other. Until Vervecken had an excellent line choice on the last major climb of the course before the finish. Doing so shot him past Page as he went on to successfully defend his world title. Franzoi was able to hold his third position for the bronze medal, while Bart Wellens came in fourth with what was later reported a broken wrist.

== Ranking ==
Rank	Cyclist	Time
Gold medal	Erwin Vervecken (BEL)	1:05:35,5
Silver medal	Jonathan Page (USA)	+ 0:02,7
Bronze medal	Enrico Franzoi (ITA)	+ 0:16,7
4	Bart Wellens (BEL)	+ 0:25,4
5	Kevin Pauwels (BEL)	+ 0:31,2
6	Richard Groenendaal (NED)	+ 0:34,3
7	Gerben De Knegt (NED)	+ 1:12,4
8	John Gadret (FRA)	+ 1:26,2
9	Christian Heule (SUI)	+ 1:35,4
10	Thijs Al (NED)	+ 1:40,7
11	Sven Nys (BEL)	+ 2:04,0
12	Sven Vanthourenhout (BEL)	+ 2:22,5
13	Marco Aurelio Fontana (ITA)	+ 2:46,8
14	Maarten Nijland (NED)	+ 2:57,7
15	Klaas Vantornout (BEL)	+ 2:57,8
16	David Derepas (FRA)	+ 3:02,6
17	José Antonio Hermida (ESP)	+ 3:04,7
18	Lukas Flückiger (SUI)	+ 3:25,4
19	Arnaud Labbe (FRA)	+ 3:27,0
20	Marek Cichosz (POL)	+ 3:31,9
21	Simon Zahner (SUI)	+ 3:43,6
22	Maros Kovac (SVK)	+ 3:54,9
23	Ryan Trebon (USA)	+ 3:59,2
24	Petr Dlask (CZE)	+ 4:05,8
25	Bart Aernouts (BEL)	+ 4:22,0
26	Alessandro Fontana (ITA)	+ 4:34,7
27	Robert Glajza (SVK)	+ 4:46,6
28	René Birkenfeld (GER)	+ 4:56,3
29	Steve Chainel (FRA)	+ 5:42,3
30	Milan Barenyi (SVK)	+ 5:49,7
31	Davide Frattini (ITA)	+ 6:01,9
32	Joachim Parbo (DEN)	+ 6:16,2
33	Unai Yus Kerejeta (ESP)	+ 6:33,2
34	Phillip Dixon (GBR)	+ 6:39,8
35	Keiichi Tsujiura (JPN)	+ 6:47,2
36	Marco Bianco (ITA)	+ 6:51,8
37	Robert Jebb (GBR)	+ 7:17,7
38	Gusty Bausch (LUX)	+ 7:29,0
39	Kashi Leuchs (NZL)	+ 7:34,0
40	Wilant Van Gils (NED)	+ 7:41,7
41	Isaac Suarez Fernandez (ESP)	+ 7:58,3
42	Fredrik Ericsson (SWE)	+ 8:16,2
43	Eric Tonkin (USA)	+ 8:25,0
44	Vaclav Metlicka (SVK)	+ 8:36,9
45	Mariusz Gil (POL)	+ 9:06,7
46	Dariusz Gil (POL)	1 LAP
47	Andrzej Kaiser (POL)	1 LAP
48	Greg Reain (CAN)	1 LAP
49	Oscar Vazquez Crespo (ESP)	1 LAP
50	Peter Presslauer (AUT)	1 LAP
51	Masanori Kosaka (JPN)	1 LAP
52	Mike Garrigan (CAN)	1 LAP
53	Atsushi Maruyama (JPN)	1 LAP
54	Barry Wicks (USA)	1 LAP
55	Jan Chrobak (CZE)	1 LAP
56	Thorsten Struch (GER)	1 LAP
57	Tristan Schouten (USA)	1 LAP

Seven riders abandoned the race: Kamil Ausbuher (Czech Republic), Davy Commeyne (Belgium), Mohamed Conway (Zimbabwe), Masahiko Mifune (Japan), Tshabalala Nqobizitha (Zimbabwe), Radomír Šimůnek (Czech Republic), Malte Urban (Germany) and Camiel Van Den Bergh (Netherlands). Francis Mourey (France) did not start due to a fall two days before the World Championship.
