= 2003 UCI Cyclo-cross World Championships =

Cyclo-cross championship

- Venue: Monopoli, Italy
- Date: February 1–2, 2003
- Coordinates: 40°57′N 17°18′E
- Events: 4

The 2003 UCI Cyclo-cross World Championships were held in Monopoli, Italy on Saturday February 1 and Sunday February 2, 2003.

== Medal summary ==
Event	Gold		Silver		Bronze	
Men's events
Men's elite race	Bart Wellens (BEL)	56' 43"	Mario De Clercq (BEL)	+ 38"	Erwin Vervecken (BEL)	+ 1' 20"
Men's under-23 race	Enrico Franzoi (ITA)	49' 22"	Wesley Van Der Linden (BEL)	+ 28"	Thys Verhagen (NED)	+ 35"
Men's junior race	Lars Boom (NED)	37' 51"	Eddy Van Ijzendoorn (NED)	+ 30"	Zdeněk Štybar (CZE)	+ 36"
Women's events
Women's elite race	Daphny van den Brand (NED)	38' 24"	Hanka Kupfernagel (GER)	+ 2"	Laurence Leboucher (FRA)	+ 16"

== Medal table ==
Rank	Nation	Gold	Silver	Bronze	Total
1	Netherlands (NED)	2	1	1	4
2	Belgium (BEL)	1	2	1	4
3	Italy (ITA)	1	0	0	1
4	Germany (GER)	0	1	0	1
5	Czech Republic (CZE)	0	0	1	1
5	France (FRA)	0	0	1	1
Totals (6 entries)		4	4	4	12

== Men's Elite ==
- Held on Sunday February 2, 2003

RANK	2003 UCI CYCLO-CROSS WORLD CHAMPIONSHIPS	TIME
	Bart Wellens (BEL)	00:56:43
	Mario De Clercq (BEL)	+ 0:38
	Erwin Vervecken (BEL)	+ 1:20
4.	Ben Berden (BEL)	+ 1:28
5.	Sven Nys (BEL)	—
6.	Francis Mourey (FRA)	+ 2:07
7.	Daniele Pontoni (ITA)	—
8.	Tom Vannoppen (BEL)	+ 2:24
9.	Jiri Pospisil (CZE)	+ 2:26
10.	Arnaud Labbé (FRA)	—

== Women's Elite ==
- Held on Sunday February 2, 2003

RANK	2003 UCI CYCLO-CROSS WORLD CHAMPIONSHIPS	TIME
	Daphny van den Brand (NED)	00:38:24
	Hanka Kupfernagel (GER)	+ 0:02
	Laurence Leboucher (FRA)	+ 0:16
4.	Annabella Stropparo (ITA)	+ 0:31
5.	Mette Andersen (DEN)	+ 1:05
6.	Maria Paola Turcutto (ITA)	+ 1:10
7.	Maryline Salvetat (FRA)	+ 1:17
8.	Nicole de Bie-Leyten (NED)	+ 1:21
9.	Corine Dorland (NED)	—
10.	Ann Grande (USA)	—

== Men's Under 23 ==
- Held on Saturday February 1, 2003

RANK	2003 UCI CYCLO-CROSS WORLD CHAMPIONSHIPS	TIME
	Enrico Franzoi (ITA)	00:49:22
	Wesley Van Der Linden (BEL)	+ 0:28
	Thys Verhagen (NED)	+ 0:35
4.	Martin Bína (CZE)	+ 1:25
5.	Bart Aernouts (BEL)	+ 1:31
6.	Jean-Baptiste Beraud (FRA)	+ 1:32
7.	Tim Van Nuffel (BEL)	+ 1:33
8.	Steve Chainel (FRA)	+ 1:35
9.	Pieter Weening (NED)	+ 1:36
10.	Theo Eltink (NED)	+ 1:36

== Men's Under 18 ==
- Held on Saturday February 1, 2003

RANK	2003 UCI CYCLO-CROSS WORLD CHAMPIONSHIPS	TIME
	Lars Boom (NED)	00:37:51
	Eddy Van Ijzendoorn (NED)	+ 0:30
	Zdeněk Štybar (CZE)	+ 0:36
4.	Sebastiaan Langeveld (NED)	+ 0:39
5.	Romain Villa (FRA)	+ 1:01
6.	Jan Sel (CZE)	+ 1:07
7.	Niels Albert (BEL)	+ 1:34
8.	František Klouček (CZE)	+ 1:38
9.	Clément Lhotellerie (FRA)	+ 1:39
10.	Tom van den Bosch (BEL)	+ 1:55
