= 2005 UCI Cyclo-cross World Championships =

Cyclo-cross championship

- Venue: (Germany) Sankt Wendel, Netherlands
- Date: January 29–30, 2005
- Coordinates: 49°28′N 7°10′E
- Events: 4

The 2005 UCI Cyclo-cross World Championships were held in Sankt Wendel, Germany from Saturday January 29 to Sunday January 30, 2005.

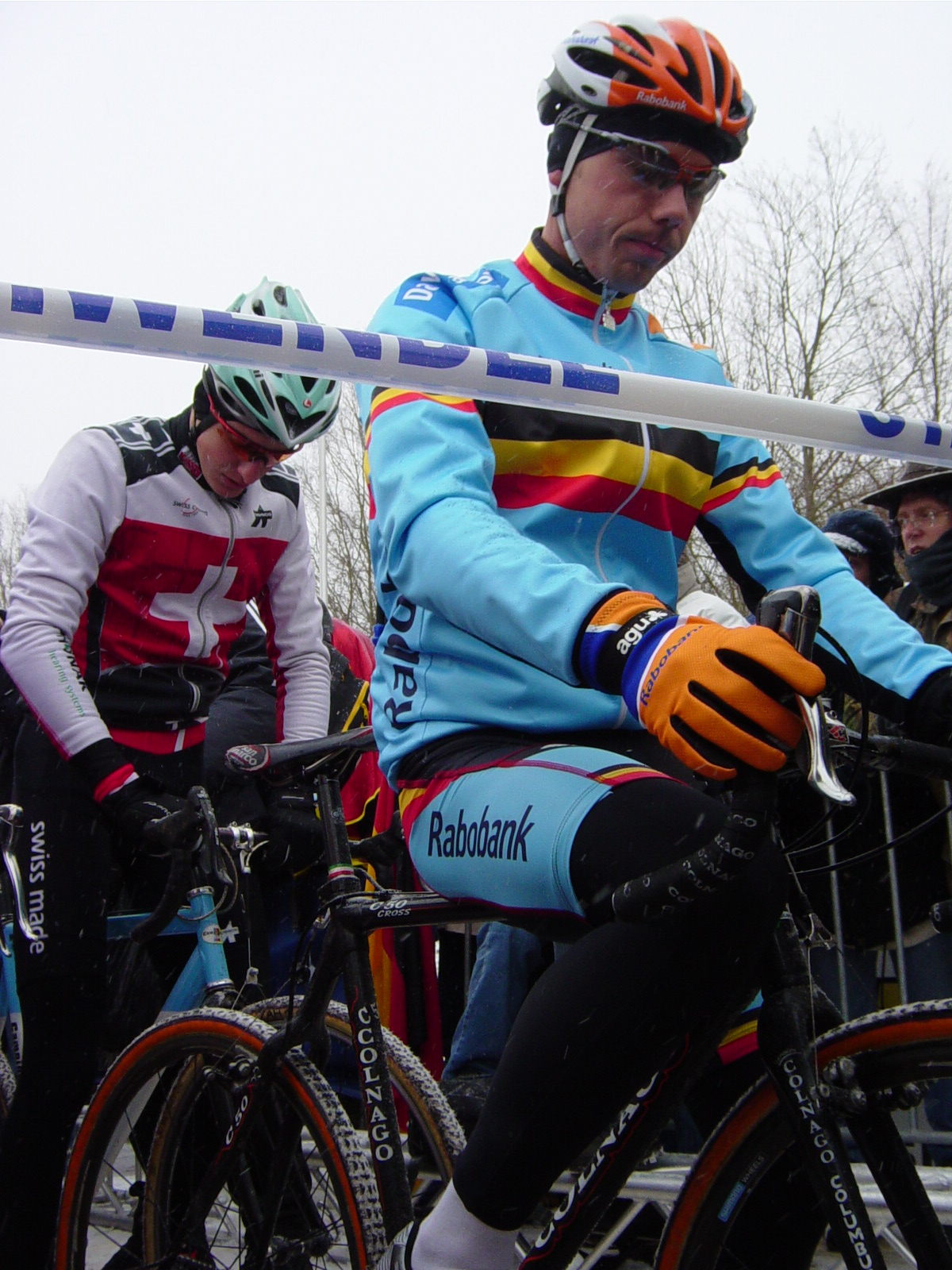
Sven Nys at the start of the men's elite race

== Medal summary ==
Event	Gold		Silver		Bronze	
Men's events
Men's elite race	Sven Nys (BEL)	1h 01' 34"	Erwin Vervecken (BEL)	+ 2"	Sven Vanthourenhout (BEL)	+ 13"
Men's under-23 race	Zdeněk Štybar (CZE)	50' 12"	Radomír Šimůnek (CZE)	+ 21"	Simon Zahner (SUI)	+ 25"
Men's junior race	Davide Malacarne (ITA)	38' 52"	Julien Taramarcaz (SUI)	s.t.	Christoph Pfingsten (GER)	s.t.
Women's events
Women's elite race	Hanka Kupfernagel (GER)	41' 42"	Sabine Spitz (GER)	+ 28"	Mirjam Melchers (NED)	+ 32"

== Medal table ==
Rank	Nation	Gold	Silver	Bronze	Total
1	Belgium (BEL)	1	1	1	3
1	Germany (GER)	1	1	1	3
3	Czech Republic (CZE)	1	1	0	2
4	Italy (ITA)	1	0	0	1
5	Switzerland (SUI)	0	1	1	2
6	Netherlands (NED)	0	0	1	1
Totals (6 entries)		4	4	4	12

== Men's Elite ==
- Held on Sunday January 30, 2005

RANK	2005 UCI CYCLO-CROSS WORLD CHAMPIONSHIPS	TIME
	Sven Nys (BEL)	01:01:34
	Erwin Vervecken (BEL)	+ 0.02
	Sven Vanthourenhout (BEL)	+ 0.13
4.	Francis Mourey (FRA)	+ 0.31
5.	Davy Commeyne (BEL)	—
6.	Tom Vannoppen (BEL)	—
7.	Petr Dlask (CZE)	+ 0.42
8.	Enrico Franzoi (ITA)	—
9.	Michael Baumgärtner (SUI)	—
10.	Wilant van Gils (NED)	—

== Men's Juniors ==
- Held on Saturday January 29, 2005

RANK	2005 UCI CYCLO-CROSS WORLD CHAMPIONSHIPS	TIME
	Davide Malacarne (ITA)	00:38:52
	Julien Taramarcaz (SUI)	—
	Christoph Pfingsten (GER)	—
4.	Romain Lejeune (FRA)	+ 0.10
5.	Ricardo van der Velde (NED)	+ 0.14
6.	Lukas Kloucek (CZE)	+ 0.42
7.	Ondrej Bambula (CZE)	+ 0.49
8.	Yannick Martinez (FRA)	—
9.	Robert Gavenda (SVK)	+ 0.50
10.	Guillaume Perrot (FRA)	+ 0.51

== Men's Espoirs ==
- Held on Saturday January 29, 2005

RANK	2005 UCI CYCLO-CROSS WORLD CHAMPIONSHIPS	TIME
	Zdeněk Štybar (CZE)	00:50:12
	Radomír Šimůnek, Jr. (CZE)	+ 0.21
	Simon Zahner (SUI)	+ 0.25
4.	Lukas Flückiger (SUI)	+ 0.28
5.	Niels Albert (BEL)	+ 0.35
6.	Kevin Pauwels (BEL)	+ 0.59
7.	Derik Zampedri (ITA)	+ 1.26
8.	Steve Chainel (FRA)	+ 1.27
9.	Lars Boom (NED)	+ 1.28
10.	Krzysztof Kuzniak (POL)	—

== Women's Elite ==
- Held on Sunday January 30, 2005

RANK	2005 UCI CYCLO-CROSS WORLD CHAMPIONSHIPS	TIME
	Hanka Kupfernagel (GER)	00:41:42
	Sabine Spitz (GER)	+ 0:28
	Mirjam Melchers (NED)	+ 0:32
4.	Laurence Leboucher (FRA)	—
5.	Maryline Salvetat (FRA)	—
6.	Daphny van den Brand (NED)	+ 2:02
7.	Ann Knapp (USA)	+ 2:16
8.	Anja Nobus (BEL)	+ 2:24
9.	Marianne Vos (NED)	+ 2:25
10.	Nadia Triquet (FRA)	+ 2:47
