= 1998 UCI Cyclo-cross World Championships =

Cyclo-cross championship

- Venue: Middelfart, Denmark
- Date: 31 January 1998
- Coordinates: 55°29′55″N 9°44′40″E
- Events: 3

The 1998 UCI Cyclo-cross World Championships were held in Middelfart, Denmark on Saturday 31 January 1998. The course was dry, hard and technical. Weather conditions were sunny and freezing (-2°C).

== Medal table ==
| Rank | Nation | Gold | Silver | Bronze | Total |
|---|---|---|---|---|---|
| 1 | Belgium (BEL) | 2 | 2 | 1 | 5 |
| 2 | Switzerland (SUI) | 1 | 0 | 0 | 1 |
| 3 | Italy (ITA) | 0 | 1 | 0 | 1 |
| 4 | Czech Republic (CZE) | 0 | 0 | 1 | 1 |
| 4 | Denmark (DEN) | 0 | 0 | 1 | 1 |
| Totals (5 entries) | | 3 | 3 | 3 | 9 |

== Medal summary ==
| Event | Gold | | Silver | | Bronze | |
|---|---|---|---|---|---|---|
| Men's elite race | Mario De Clercq (BEL) | 01:04:06 | Erwin Vervecken (BEL) | + 1:04 | Henrik Djernis (DEN) | + 1:07 |
| Men's under-23 race | Sven Nys (BEL) | 52:14 | Bart Wellens (BEL) | + 0:24 | Petr Dlask (CZE) | + 0:29 |
| Men's junior race | Michael Baumgartner (SUI) | 38:56 | Stefano Toffoletti (ITA) | + 0:03 | Davy Commeyne (BEL) | + 0:03 |

== Men's Elite ==
Held on Sunday January 31, 1998. Being the main event of the day, over 10,000 people had come to watch nine laps (27.675 kilometres) of cyclo-cross. Mario De Clercq got an early lead and managed to widen it lap by lap. Meanwhile in the background his fellow countryman Erwin Vervecken was controlling the chasing group with ease, sacrificing personal gain for the nation. Parrying every attack, Vervecken managed to play out his own cards in the final climb and raced to a silver medal. Henrik Djernis took the bronze with Daniele Pontoni crashing while trying to pass the Dane in the last line.

| RANK | 1998 UCI CYCLO-CROSS WORLD CHAMPIONSHIPS | TIME |
|---|---|---|
| 1. Gold medal | Mario De Clercq (BEL) | 01:04:06 |
| 2. Silver medal | Erwin Vervecken (BEL) | + 1:04 |
| 3. Bronze medal | Henrik Djernis (DEN) | + 1:07 |
| 4. | Daniele Pontoni (ITA) | + 1:07 |
| 5. | Radomír Šimůnek, Sr. (CZE) | + 1:19 |
| 6. | Emmanuel Magnien (FRA) | + 1:23 |
| 7. | Dieter Runkel (SUI) | + 1:55 |
| 8. | Christophe Mengin (FRA) | + 2:17 |
| 9. | Richard Groenendaal (NED) | + 2:28 |
| 10. | Beat Wabel (SUI) | + 2:31 |

== Men's Under 23 ==
Held on Sunday January 31, 1998. The gathered crowd of 5,000 saw a repeat of the year before with Sven Nys and Bart Wellens claiming gold and silver. Petr Dlask completed the podium. The riders had to complete seven laps, totalling up to 22.5 kilometres.

| RANK | 1998 UCI CYCLO-CROSS WORLD CHAMPIONSHIPS U23 | TIME |
|---|---|---|
| 1. Gold medal | Sven Nys (BEL) | 52:14 |
| 2. Silver medal | Bart Wellens (BEL) | + 0:24 |
| 3. Bronze medal | Petr Dlask (CZE) | + 0:29 |
| 4 | Klaus Nielsen (DEN) | + 0:45 |
| 5 | Guillaume Benoist (FRA) | + 0:47 |
| 6 | Pawel Prosek (CZE) | + 0:59 |
| 7 | Maarten Nijland (NED) | + 1:08 |
| 8 | Raymond Lubberman (NED) | + 1:10 |
| 9 | Fabrizio Dall'Oste (ITA) | + 1:12 |
| 10 | Tim Johnson (USA) | + 1:12 |

== Men's Junior ==
Held on January 31, 1998.

| RANK | 1998 UCI CYCLO-CROSS WORLD CHAMPIONSHIPS JUNIOR | TIME |
|---|---|---|
| 1. Gold medal | Michael Baumgartner (SUI) | 38:56 |
| 2. Silver medal | Stefano Toffoletti (ITA) | + 0:03 |
| 3. Bronze medal | Davy Commeyne (BEL) | + 0:03 |
| 4 | Martin Ocasek (CZE) | + 0:05 |
| 5 | Sven Vanthourenhout (BEL) | + 0:09 |
| 6 | Björn Schröder (GER) | + 0:09 |
| 7 | Tilo Schüler (GER) | + 0:16 |
| 8 | Tomas Trunschka (CZE) | + 0:16 |
| 9 | Pavel Bartos (CZE) | + 0:16 |
| 10 | Grégory Rast (SUI) | + 0:16 |
