= 2002 UCI Cyclo-cross World Championships =

Cyclo-cross championship

- Venue: Zolder, Belgium
- Date: February 2–3, 2002
- Coordinates: 51°03′N 05°17′E
- Events: 4

The 2002 UCI Cyclo-cross World Championships were held in Zolder, Belgium on Saturday February 2 and Sunday February 3, 2002.

== Medal summary ==
Event	Gold		Silver		Bronze	
Men's events
Men's elite race	Mario De Clercq (BEL)	1h 01' 11"	Tom Vannoppen (BEL)	+ 3"	Sven Nys (BEL)	+ 6"
Men's under-23 race	Thijs Verhagen (NED)	49' 48"	Davy Commeyne (BEL)	s.t.	Tomas Trunschka (CZE)	s.t.
Men's junior race	Kevin Pauwels (BEL)	41'18"	Krzysztof Kuzniak (POL)	+ 11"	Zdeněk Štybar (CZE)	+ 15"
Women's events
Women's elite race	Laurence Leboucher (FRA)	42'57"	Hanka Kupfernagel (GER)	+ 1"	Daphny van den Brand (NED)	+ 9"

== Medal table ==
Rank	Nation	Gold	Silver	Bronze	Total
1	Belgium (BEL)	2	2	1	5
2	Netherlands (NED)	1	0	1	2
3	France (FRA)	1	0	0	1
4	Germany (GER)	0	1	0	1
4	Poland (POL)	0	1	0	1
6	Czech Republic (CZE)	0	0	2	2
Totals (6 entries)		4	4	4	12

== Men's Elite ==
- Held on Sunday February 3, 2002

RANK	2002 UCI CYCLO-CROSS WORLD CHAMPIONSHIPS	TIME
	Mario De Clercq (BEL)	01:01:11
	Tom Vannoppen (BEL)	+ 0:03
	Sven Nys (BEL)	+ 0:06
4.	Richard Groenendaal (NED)	+ 0:10
5.	Gerben de Knegt (NED)	+ 0:14
6.	Dominique Arnould (FRA)	+ 0:21
7.	Wim de Vos (NED)	+ 0:22
8.	Bart Wellens (BEL)	+ 0:26
9.	Ben Berden (BEL)	+ 1:19
10.	Thomas Frischknecht (SUI)	+ 1:38

== Women's Elite ==
- Held on Sunday February 3, 2002

RANK	2002 UCI CYCLO-CROSS WORLD CHAMPIONSHIPS	TIME
	Laurence Leboucher (FRA)	00:39:06
	Hanka Kupfernagel (GER)	+ 1:04
	Daphny van den Brand (NED)	—
4.	Alison Dunlap (USA)	—
5.	Ann Grande (USA)	+ 1:41
6.	Anja Nobus (BEL)	+ 2:00
7.	Reza Hormes-Ravenstijn (NED)	—
8.	Birgit Hollmann (GER)	—
9.	Hilde Quintens (BEL)	+ 2:05
10.	Carmen d'Aluisio (USA)	+ 2:12
