= 2006 UCI Cyclo-cross World Championships =

Cyclo-cross championship

- Location within Netherlands
- Venue: Zeddam, Netherlands
- Date: January 28–29, 2006
- Coordinates: 51.90311°N 6.25694°E
- Events: 4

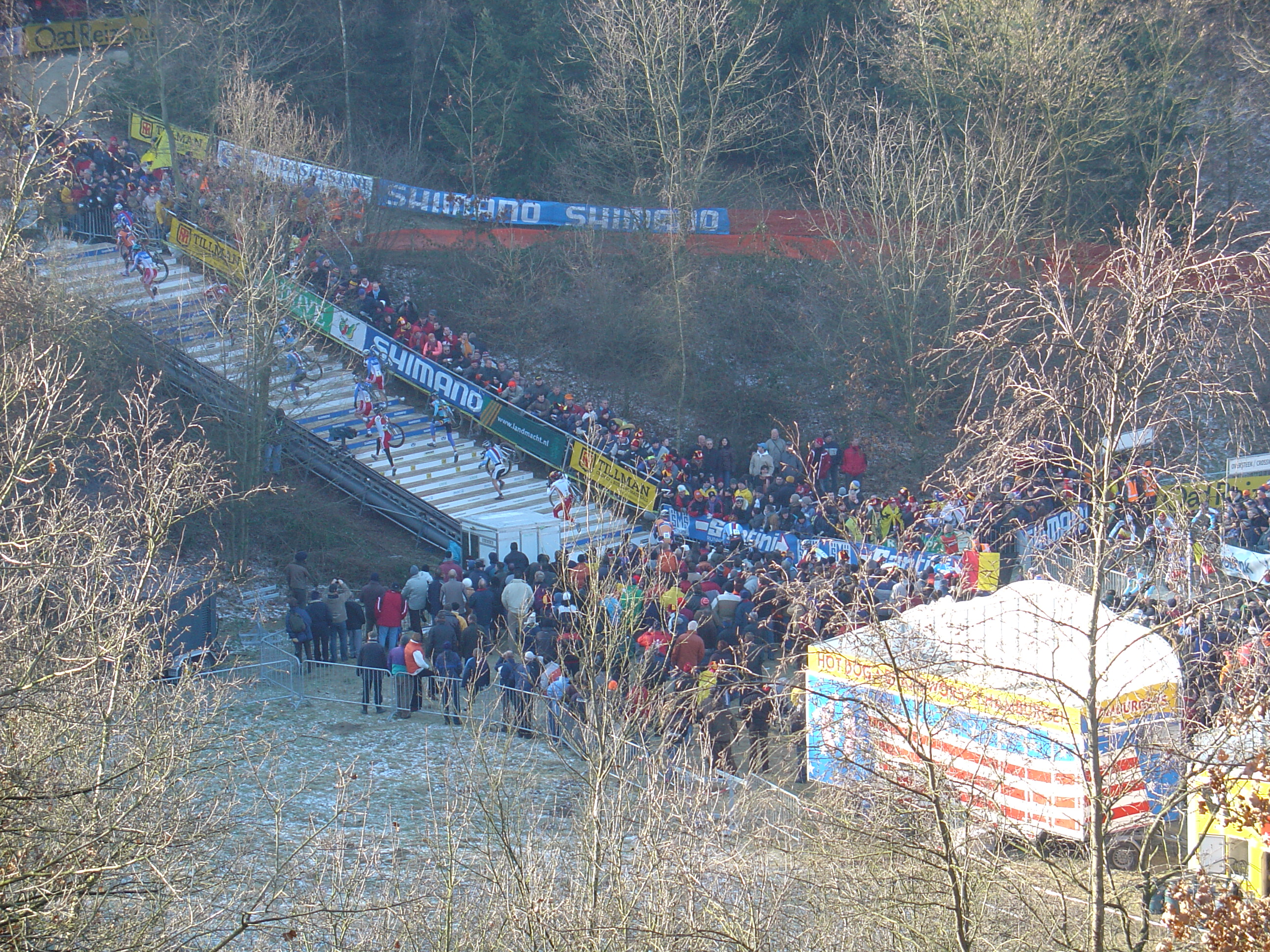
Riders (elite) running up the stairs with their bike

The 2006 UCI Cyclo-cross World Championships were held in Zeddam, the Netherlands from Saturday January 28 to Sunday January 29, 2006.

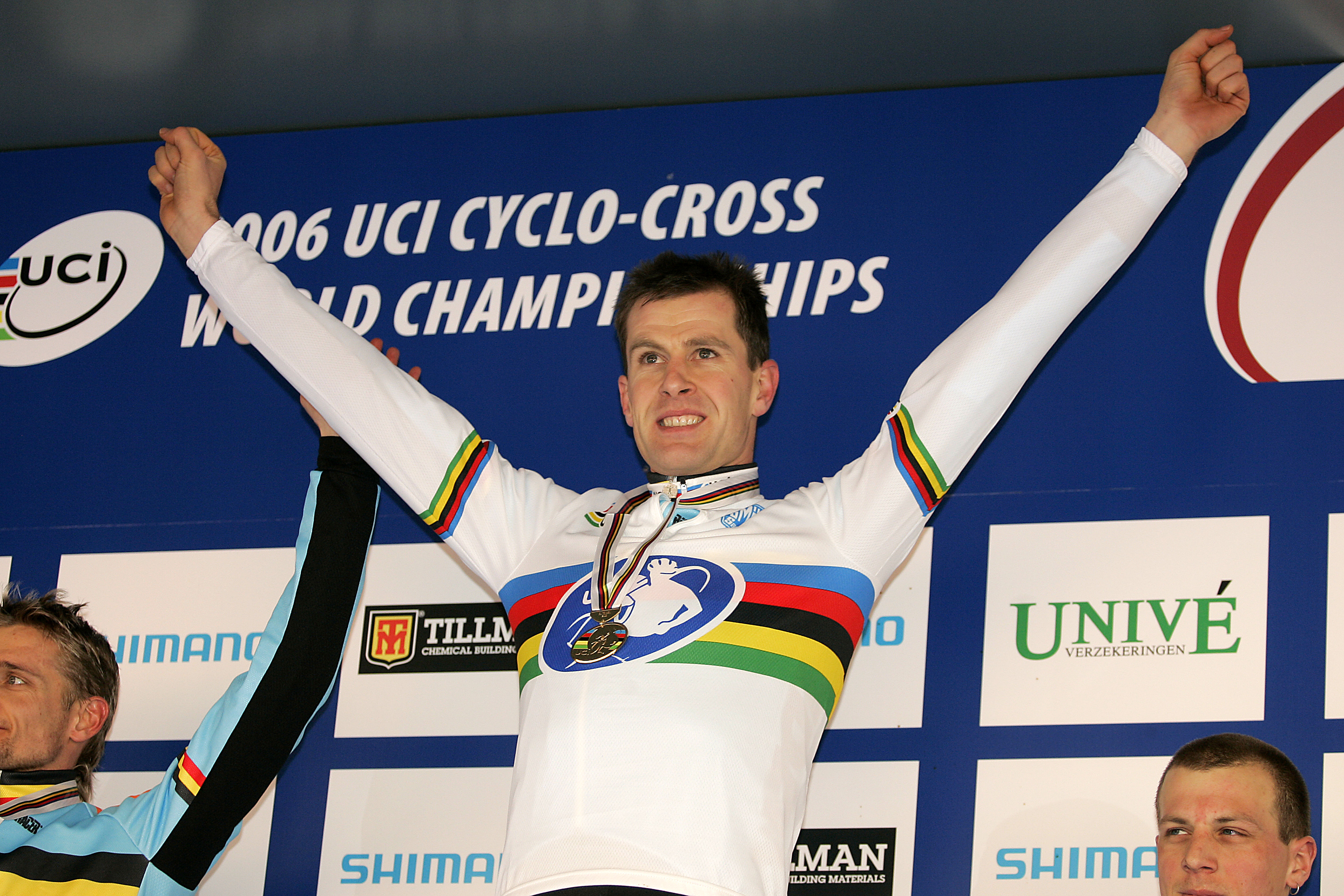
Men's elite race winner Erwin Vervecken

== Medal summary ==
| Event | Gold | | Silver | | Bronze | |
|---|---|---|---|---|---|---|
Men's events
| Men's elite race | Erwin Vervecken (BEL) | 1h 05' 40" | Bart Wellens (BEL) | + 2" | Francis Mourey (FRA) | s.t. |
| Men's under-23 race | Zdeněk Štybar (CZE) | 51' 01" | Lars Boom (NED) | s.t. | Niels Albert (BEL) | + 2" |
| Men's junior race | Boy van Poppel (NED) | 38' 03" | Robert Gavenda (SVK) | + 3" | Tom Meeusen (BEL) | + 9" |
Women's events
| Women's elite race | Marianne Vos (NED) | 39' 14" | Hanka Kupfernagel (GER) | s.t. | Daphny van den Brand (NED) | + 52" |

== Medal table ==
| Rank | Nation | Gold | Silver | Bronze | Total |
|---|---|---|---|---|---|
| 1 | Netherlands (NED) | 2 | 1 | 1 | 4 |
| 2 | Belgium (BEL) | 1 | 1 | 2 | 4 |
| 3 | Czech Republic (CZE) | 1 | 0 | 0 | 1 |
| 4 | Germany (GER) | 0 | 1 | 0 | 1 |
| 4 | Slovakia (SVK) | 0 | 1 | 0 | 1 |
| 6 | France (FRA) | 0 | 0 | 1 | 1 |
| Totals (6 entries) | | 4 | 4 | 4 | 12 |

== Men's Elite ==
- Held on Sunday January 29, 2006

| RANK | 2006 UCI CYCLO-CROSS WORLD CHAMPIONSHIPS | TIME |
|---|---|---|
| | Erwin Vervecken (BEL) | 01:05:40 |
| | Bart Wellens (BEL) | + 0.02 |
| | Francis Mourey (FRA) | — |
| 4. | Steve Chainel (FRA) | + 0.12 |
| 5. | Tom Vannoppen (BEL) | + 0.15 |
| 6. | Kamil Ausbuher (CZE) | + 0.19 |
| 7. | Enrico Franzoi (ITA) | + 0.32 |
| 8. | Gerben de Knegt (NED) | + 0.46 |
| 9. | Vladimir Kyzivat (CZE) | + 0.49 |
| 10. | Jonathan Page (USA) | + 0.50 |

== Men's Juniors ==
- Held on Saturday January 28, 2006

| RANK | 2006 UCI CYCLO-CROSS WORLD CHAMPIONSHIPS | TIME |
|---|---|---|
| | Boy van Poppel (NED) | 00:38:03 |
| | Robert Gavenda (SVK) | + 0.03 |
| | Tom Meeusen (BEL) | + 0.09 |
| 4. | Yannick Martinez (FRA) | + 0.14 |
| 5. | Sascha Weber (GER) | + 0.20 |
| 6. | David Menger (CZE) | — |
| 7. | Bjørn Selander (USA) | — |
| 8. | Mathias Flückiger (SUI) | + 0.37 |
| 9. | Johim Ariesen (NED) | + 0.38 |
| 10. | Sylwester Janiszewski (POL) | — |

== Men's Espoirs ==
- Held on Saturday January 28, 2006

| RANK | 2006 UCI CYCLO-CROSS WORLD CHAMPIONSHIPS | TIME |
|---|---|---|
| | Zdeněk Štybar (CZE) | 00:51:01 |
| | Lars Boom (NED) | — |
| | Niels Albert (BEL) | + 0.02 |
| 4. | Aurelio Fontana (ITA) | + 1.03 |
| 5. | Lukas Flückiger (SUI) | + 1.08 |
| 6. | Sebastian Langeveld (NED) | + 1.25 |
| 7. | Romain Villa (FRA) | + 1.31 |
| 8. | Jempy Drucker (LUX) | + 1.32 |
| 9. | Dieter Vanthourenhout (BEL) | + 1.37 |
| 10. | Paul Voss (GER) | + 1.38 |

== Women's Elite ==
- Held on Sunday January 29, 2006

| RANK | 2006 UCI CYCLO-CROSS WORLD CHAMPIONSHIPS | TIME |
|---|---|---|
| | Marianne Vos (NED) | 00:39:14 |
| | Hanka Kupfernagel (GER) | — |
| | Daphny van den Brand (NED) | + 0:52 |
| 4. | Mirjam Melchers (NED) | + 1:16 |
| 5. | Helen Wyman (GBR) | + 2:22 |
| 6. | Maryline Salvetat (FRA) | + 2:26 |
| 7. | Nadia Triquet-Claude (FRA) | + 2:29 |
| 8. | Birgit Hollmann (GER) | + 2:30 |
| 9. | Ann Knapp (USA) | + 2:31 |
| 10. | Lyne Bessette (CAN) | + 2:40 |

== See also ==
- 2006 World University Cycling Championship
