= Davide Malacarne =

Italian cyclist

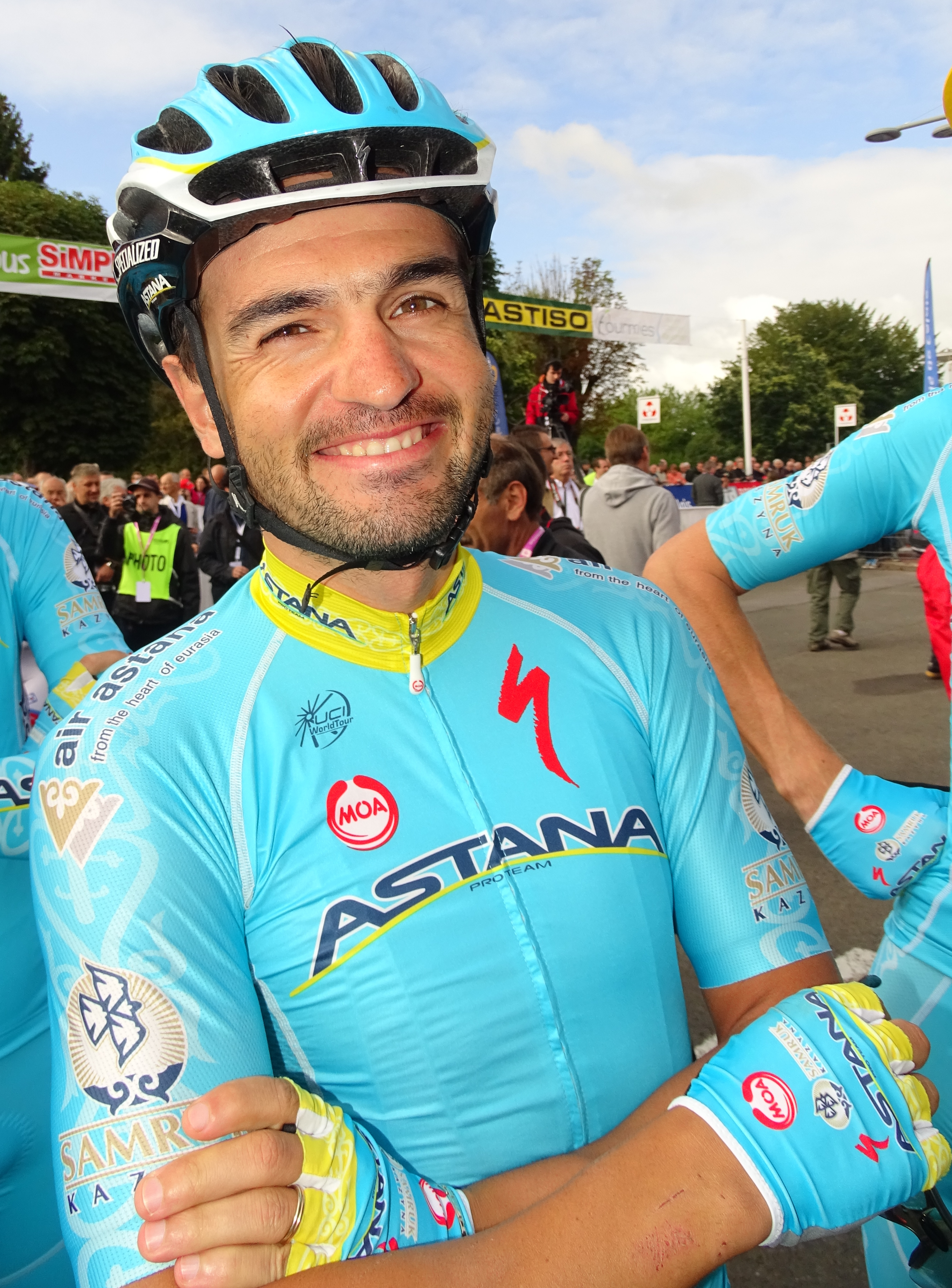
- Malacarne in 2015

Personal information
- Full name: Davide Malacarne
- Born: 11 July 1987 (age 39) Feltre, Italy
- Height: 1.72 m (5 ft 8 in)
- Weight: 61 kg (134 lb; 9.6 st)

Cycling career
- Sport: Cycling
- Current team: Retired
- Disciplines: Mountain biking; Road; Cyclo-cross
- Role: Rider
- Rider type: Climber

Amateur teams
- 2006–2007: Zalf–Désirée–Fior
- 2008: Lucchini Neri Comauto Cocif
- 2017: DMT Racing

Professional teams
- 2008: Quick-Step (stagiaire)
- 2009–2011: Quick-Step
- 2012–2014: Team Europcar
- 2015–2016: Astana
Medal record
Representing Italy
Men's cyclo-cross
World Championships
Gold medal – first place	2005 Sankt Wendel	Junior race

Davide Malacarne (born 11 July 1987) is an Italian former multi-discipline cyclist. He competed professionally in road racing between 2009 and 2016 for the Quick-Step, Team Europcar and Astana teams, won the junior race at the 2005 UCI Cyclo-cross World Championships, and rode in mountain biking for the DMT Racing team.

== Major results ==
2005
1st Junior race, UCI Cyclo-cross World Championships
2006
3rd Trofeo Alcide Degasperi
2007
4th Coppa San Geo
2008
1st Giro del Belvedere
7th Trofeo Città di San Vendemiano
8th Trofeo Alcide Degasperi
2009
2nd Overall Tour of Turkey
3rd Coppa Sabatini
2010
1st Stage 5 Volta a Catalunya
2011
1st Mountains classification Tirreno–Adriatico
2012
4th Les Boucles du Sud-Ardèche
5th Grand Prix d'Ouverture La Marseillaise
2013
7th Brabantse Pijl
9th Les Boucles du Sud-Ardèche
2015
1st Stage 2 (TTT) Vuelta a Burgos
2016
1st Stage 1 (TTT) Giro del Trentino
1st Stage 2 (TTT) Vuelta a Burgos

=== Grand Tour general classification results timeline ===
Grand Tour	2009	2010	2011	2012	2013	2014	2015	2016
Giro d'Italia	DNF	—	146	—	—	39	85	47
Tour de France	—	—	—	59	49	—	—	—
Vuelta a España	—	126	56	—	—	—	—	DNF
