= Hanka Kupfernagel =

German cyclist (born 1974)

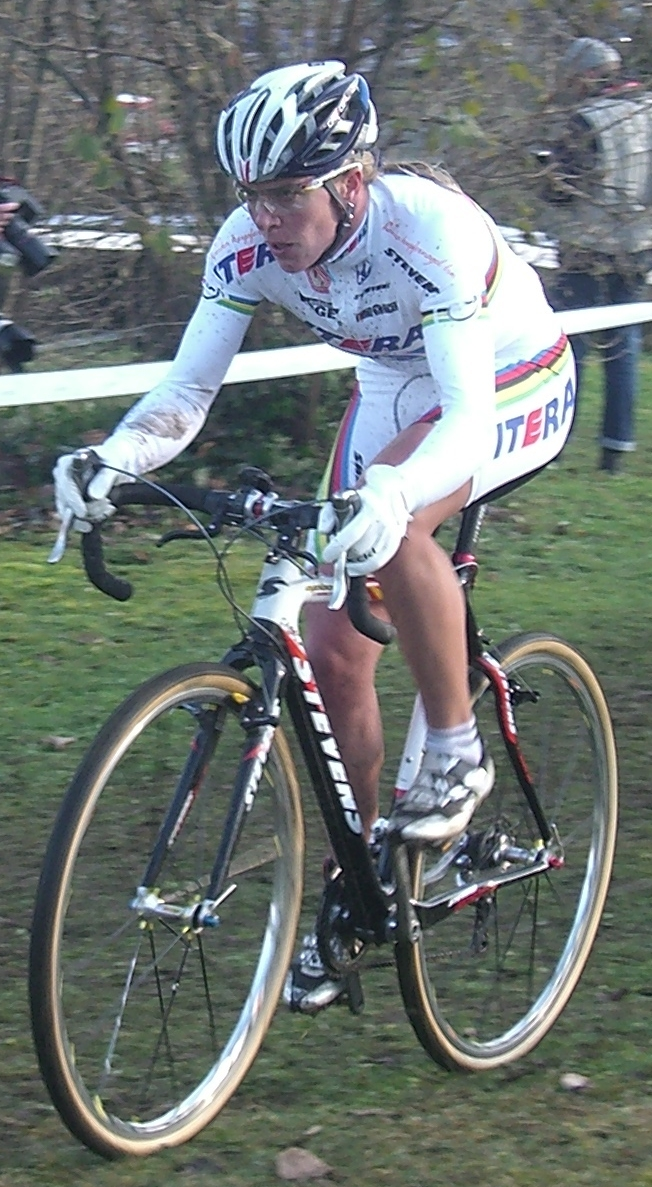
- Kupfernagel competing in cyclo-cross in 2008

Personal information
- Full name: Hanka Kupfernagel
- Born: 19 March 1974 (age 52) Gera, Bezirk Gera, East Germany
- Height: 1.74 m (5 ft 9 in)

Cycling career
- Sport: Cycling
- Current team: Retired
- Disciplines: Road; Cyclo-cross; Mountain biking
- Role: Rider

Amateur teams
- 2007: RC Charlottenburg Berlin
- 2011: Horizon Fitness Racing Team
- 2014–2016: Maxx–Solar

Professional teams
- 2001: Team Farm Frites–Hartol
- 2004–2005: Vlaanderen–T Interim Univega Ladies Team
- 2012–2013: RusVelo Women's Team
Medal record
Representing Germany
Women's Road bicycle racing
Olympic Games
Silver medal – second place	2000 Sydney	Road race
UCI Road World Championships
Gold medal – first place	2007	Time Trial
Bronze medal – third place	1998	Road race
Bronze medal – third place	1998	Time Trial
Women's Cyclo-cross
UCI Cyclo-cross World Championships
Gold medal – first place	2000	Women elite race
Gold medal – first place	2001	Women elite race
Gold medal – first place	2005	Women elite race
Gold medal – first place	2008	Women elite race
Silver medal – second place	2002	Women elite race
Silver medal – second place	2003	Women elite race
Silver medal – second place	2006	Women elite race
Silver medal – second place	2009	Women elite race
Bronze medal – third place	2004	Women elite race

Hanka Kupfernagel (born 19 March 1974 in Gera, Bezirk Gera) is a retired German professional cycle racer. During most of her career her primary focus was cyclo-cross racing, however, she has also won major road, track and mountain bike races. She has won seven consecutive medals at the UCI Women's Cyclo-cross World Championships, including three gold medals in 2000, 2001 and 2005; two silver medals in 2002 and 2003; and the bronze medal in 2004. Her major career victories also include a gold medal in the individual time trial competition at the 2007 UCI Road World Championships in Stuttgart and a silver medal in the road race at the 2000 Summer Olympics in Sydney.

She finished 1st in the year-end UCI world class rankings in 1997 and 1999 winning the 1999 La Flèche Wallonne Féminine in the process. Kupfernagel captured the Emakumeen Bira cyclo-cross race for three consecutive years from 1997 to 1999.

In 2007, the three-times world cyclo-cross champion added world time trial champion to her palmares when she won gold at the 2007 UCI Road World Championships Women's Time Trial. She also won the Sparkassen Giro Bochum.

In 2008, she had a very strong cyclo-cross season, winning two World Cup races and even though she finished in the second place six times, she had enough point to claim the overall World Cup title. She seemed to be the favourite for the women's race at the 2009 UCI Cyclo-cross World Championships in Hoogerheide, but she was not able to defend her title as Marianne Vos beat her during a sprint finish and left her with the silver medal.

Kupfernagel officially retired in 2016. After three and a half years out of competition she participated in the German cyclo-cross championship 2019 at the age of 44 finishing the race in second place.

== Major results ==
=== Road ===
1992
1st Road Race, UCI Junior Road World Championships
1st Overall Tour de Bretagne

1994
1st Overall Berliner Rundfahrt

1st Prologue & Stage 3

1st Eschborn–Frankfurt City Loop
2nd Frühjahrsstraßenpreis
3rd Overall Essen Etappenfahrt

1st Stage 1

3rd Overall Krasna Lipa Tour Féminine

1995
National Road Championships

1st Road Race
1st Time Trial

1st Overall Gracia–Orlová

1st Stages 1 & 3

1st Frühjahrsstraßenpreis
1st Laimnau-Wiesertsweiler
1st Eberdingen–Hochdorf
1st Main-Spessart Rundfahrt
1st Karbach Criterium
1st Oy-Mittelberg Criterium
1st Forst Criterium
1st Forst Chrono (TTT)
1st Irrel-Ferschweller
1st Bollendorf Criterium
2nd Kampioenschap van Vlaanderen

1996
1st Road Race, U23 UEC European Road Championships
1st Time Trial, National Road Championships
1st Overall Gracia–Orlová
1st Overall Krasna Lipa Tour Féminine
1st Kampioenschap van Vlaanderen
1st Eberdingen–Hochdorf Criterium
1st Main-Spessart Rundfahrt Criterium
1st Wißmannsdorf I Criterium
1st Wißmannsdorf II Criterium
1st Genthin Criterium
1st Genthin Chrono (TTT)
1st Oy-Mittelberg Criterium
9th UCI Road World Championships – Women's time trial

1997
National Road Championships

1st Road Race
1st Time Trial
1st Hill Climb

1st Overall Emakumeen Euskal Bira
1st Overall Tour de Bretagne
1st Overall Gracia–Orlová

1st Stage 2

1st Overall Vuelta a Mallorca
1st Overall Tour du Finistère

1st Stages 1a, 2 & 6a

1st Overall Krasna Lipa Tour Féminine
1st Kampioenschap van Vlaanderen
1st Niederwangen Criterium
1st Forst Criterium
1st Forst Chrono (TTT)
1st Bad Schussenried Criterium
4th UCI Road World Championships – Women's time trial
7th Road Race, UCI Road World Championships

1998
1st Road Race, National Road Championships
1st Overall Emakumeen Euskal Bira
1st Overall Tour de Bretagne
1st Söhnlein-Rheingold-Strassenpreis
1st Wiesbaden Criterium
1st Eberdingen–Hochdorf Criterium
1st Main-Spessart Rundfahrt Criterium
1st Karbach Criterium
1st Oy-Mittelberg Criterium
2nd Overall Tour de Suisse
3rd UCI Road World Championships Road Race
3rd UCI Road World Championships – Women's time trial
3rd Overall Thüringen-Rundfahrt der Frauen
9th La Flèche Wallonne

1999
1st Road Race, National Road Championships
1st Overall Gracia–Orlová
1st Overall RaboSter Zeeuwsche Eilanden

1st Stage 3

1st Overall Thüringen-Rundfahrt der Frauen
1st Overall Emakumeen Euskal Bira
1st Overall Krasna Lipa Tour Féminine
1st La Flèche Wallonne
1st Berlin Criterium
1st Sankt Wendel Criterium
2nd Overall Tour de l'Aude Cycliste Féminin
2nd Canberra Women's Classic
3rd Liberty Classic
5th UCI Road World Championships – Women's time trial

2000
National Road Championships

1st Road Race
1st Time Trial

1st Overall Tour de l'Aude Cycliste Féminin
1st Overall Gracia–Orlová
1st Overall RaboSter Zeeuwsche Eilanden

1st Stage 3a

1st Overall Krasna Lipa Tour Féminine
1st Stage 5b
Olympic Games

2nd Road Race
8th Time Trial

3rd Overall Trophée d'Or Féminin
6th UCI Road World Championships – Women's time trial

2001
1st Dortmund Classic
1st Boxmeer Criterium
National Road Championships

2nd Road Race
3rd Time Trial

2002
1st Time Trial, National Road Championships
2nd Overall Gracia–Orlová

2003
1st Chrono Champenois – Trophée Européen
2nd Overall Albstadt Frauen Etappenrennen
2nd Overall Trophée d'Or Féminin

2004
2nd La Flèche Wallonne

2006
3rd Overall Krasna Lipa Tour Féminine

2007
1st UCI Road World Championships – Women's time trial
1st Time Trial, National Road Championships
1st Overall Krasna Lipa Tour Féminine

1st Stage 3

1st Sparkassen Giro Bochum
1st Stage 4a Emakumeen Euskal Bira
1st Stage 1 Albstadt Frauen Etapperen

2008
1st Time Trial, National Road Championships

2009
1st Stage 5 Tour du Grand Montréal

2010
1st Overall Albstadt Frauen Etapperen

1st Stage 2

3rd Time Trial, National Road Championships

2011
1st Overall Albstadt Frauen Etapperen

1st Stages 1 & 2

1st Stage 3 Krasna Lipa Tour Féminine
3rd Road Race, National Road Championships
4th Sparkassen Giro Bochum

2012
1st Overall Albstadt Frauen Etapperen
2nd Overall Tour de Free State
Open de Suède Vårgårda

2nd Road Race
5th Team Time Trial

6th Overall Thüringen-Rundfahrt der Frauen

1st Prologue

2013
1st Overall Albstadt Frauen Etapperen
9th Overall Thüringen-Rundfahrt der Frauen

2015
5th Overall Trophée d'Or Féminin
5th Nagrade Ljubljana

=== Cyclo-cross & Mountainbike ===
1995
1st Nobeyama Supercross #1
1st Shiojiri Cyclo-cross

1996
1st Herford Cyclo-cross

1997
1st GP Montferland Cyclo-cross

1999
1st München Cyclo-cross
1st Obergösgen Cyclo-cross
1st Vlaamse Industrieprijs Bosduin Cyclo-cross
1st Azencross

2000
1st UCI Cyclo-cross World Championships
1st National Cyclo-cross Championships
1st Magstadt Cyclo-cross
1st Wetzikon Cyclo-cross
1st Nootdorp Pijnacker Cyclo-cross
1st Schulteiss Cup Cyclocross
1st Lutterbach Cyclo-cross
1st Gavere Cyclo-cross
1st Trofeo Mamma & Papà Guerciotti Cyclo-cross
1st Zolder Cyclo-cross
1st Herford Cyclo-cross

2001
1st UCI Cyclo-cross World Championships
1st National Cyclo-cross Championships
1st Wetzikon Cyclo-cross
1st Frankfurt am Main Cyclo-cross
1st Wortegem-Petegem
1st Kersttrofee
1st Azencross
1st Lutterbach Cyclo-cross
1st Herford Cyclo-cross

2002
1st National Cyclo-cross Championships
1st Wetzikon Cyclo-cross
2nd UCI Cyclo-cross World Championships

2003
1st UEC European Cyclo-cross Championships
1st Sankt Wendel Cyclo-cross
1st Frankfurt am Main, Cyclo-cross
1st Kleinmachnow Cyclo-cross
1st Wetzikon Cyclo-cross
1st Trofeo Mamma & Papà Guerciotti
1st Kersttrofee Hofstade Cyclo-cross
1st Duinencross Koksijde, Cyclo-cross
1st Azencross
1st Herford Cyclo-cross
2nd UCI Cyclo-cross World Championships
2nd National Cyclo-cross Championships

2004
1st UCI Cyclo-cross World Ranking
1st Overall UCI Cyclo-cross World Cup
1st UEC European Cyclo-cross Championships
1st National Cyclo-cross Championships
1st Magstadt Cyclo-cross
1st Nommay Cyclo-cross
1st Schulteiss Cup Berlin Cyclo-cross
1st Frankfurt am Main Cyclo-cross
1st Kersttrofee Hofstade Cyclo-cross
1st Herford Cyclo-cross
3rd UCI Cyclo-cross World Championships

2005
1st UCI Cyclo-cross World Championships
1st National Cyclo-cross Championships
1st Nommay Cyclo-cross
1st Internationale Sluitingsprijs
1st Schulteiss Cup Berlin Cyclo-cross
1st Magstadt Cyclo-cross
1st Frankfurt am Main Cyclo-cross
3rd UEC European Cyclo-cross Championships

2006
1st National Cyclo-cross Championships
1st Vlaamse Industrieprijs Bosduin
1st Magstadt, Cyclo-cross
1st Nootdorp Pijnacker Cyclo-cross
1st City Cross Cup Lorsch Cyclo-cross
1st Kersttrofee Hofstade Cyclo-cross
1st Azencross
2nd UCI Cyclo-cross World Championships
2nd UEC European Cyclo-cross Championships

2007
1st UCI Cyclo-cross World Ranking
1st National Cyclo-cross Championships
1st National Mountainbike (XC) Championship
1st GP Adri van der Poel
1st Azencross
1st Frankfurt am Main

2008
1st UCI Cyclo-cross World Championships
1st UEC European Cyclo-cross Championships
1st National Cyclo-cross Championships
1st Liévin Cyclo-cross
1st GP Adri van der Poel
1st Tabor Cyclo-cross
1st Nootdorp Pijnacker Cyclo-cross
1st Frankfurt am Main Cyclo-cross
1st Scheldecross
1st Herford Cyclo-cross

2009
1st UCI Cyclo-cross World Ranking
1st Overall UCI Cyclo-cross World Cup
1st National Cyclo-cross Championships
1st City Cross Cup Lorsch Cyclo-cross
1st Strullendorf Cyclo-cross
2nd UCI Cyclo-cross World Championships

2010
1st National Cyclo-cross Championships
1st Nommay Cyclo-cross
1st Wetzikon Cyclo-cross
1st Scheldecross
2nd UCI Cyclo-cross World Championships

2011
1st National Cyclo-cross Championships
1st Vlaamse Witloof Veldrit
1st Baden Cyclo-cross
1st City Cross Cup
1st Frenkendorf Cyclo-cross

2012
1st National Cyclo-cross Championships
1st GP Oberbaselbiet
1st City Cross Cup
1st Frankfurt am Main

2013
1st Stadl-Paura Cyclo-cross
1st City Cross Cup

2014
1st National Cyclo-cross Championships

2015
1st Illnau Cyclo-cross
1st Steinmaur Cyclo-cross

=== Track ===
1991
2nd UCI Junior Track Cycling World Championships

1992
UCI Junior Track Cycling World Championships

1st Individual Pursuit
1st Points Race

1993
1st Individual Pursuit, National Track Championships

1994
1st Individual Pursuit, National Track Championships

1995
1st Individual Pursuit, National Track Championships

1996
2nd Individual Pursuit, National Track Championships
