= Wesley Van der Linden =

Belgian cyclist

Personal information
- Full name: Wesley Van der Linden
- Born: 7 March 1982 (age 44)

Cycling career
- Sport: Cycling
- Current team: Sunweb-ProJob
- Disciplines: Road, cyclo-cross
- Role: Rider

Professional teams
- 2004–2007: Chocolade Jacques
- 2007–: Sunweb-ProJob

Wesley Van der Linden (born 7 March 1982 in Geraardsbergen, East Flanders) is a Belgian professional racing cyclist.

== Career highlights ==
2000
1st, Stage 2, Heuvelland Tweedaagse
2nd, National U19 Cyclo-Cross Championship, Gent (Blaarmeersen)
2001
2nd, GP Claude Criquielion
2nd, Ruddervoorde, Cyclo-cross, U23
2003
Belgium U23 Cyclo-Cross Champion, Wielsbeke
(silver) , World U23 Cyclo-Cross Championship, Monopoli
2nd, Schulteiss-Cup, Cyclo-cross
3rd, Romsée - Stavelot - Romsée
2004
Belgium U23 Cyclo-Cross Champion, Lille
1st, Stage 5a, Circuito Montañés, Santander (La Atalaya)
1st, Asteasu, Cyclo-cross
1st, Harnes, Cyclo-cross, U23
2nd, Vorselaar, Cyclo-cross, U23
2005
1st, Asteasu, Cyclo-cross
1st, Idiazabal, Cyclo-cros
1st, Ispaster, Cyclo-cross
2007
1st, Vendin, Cyclo-cross
2nd, Le Quesnoy, Cyclo-cross
2008
1st, Ispaster, Cyclo-cross
