= Mette Andersen =

Danish cyclist

Personal information
- Full name: Mette Andersen
- Born: 9 January 1974 (age 52)

Cycling career
- Sport: Cycling

Mette Andersen (born 9 January 1974) is a Danish racing cyclist. She was junior national champion in road bicycle racing, but her specialty is mountain biking, where she also has been national champion. She has been riding for Dansk Mountainbike Klub and Team SATS. She has a BA in media science from Copenhagen University.
