= Eric Tonkin =

Australian rules footballer

Personal information
- Full name: Eric William Tonkin
- Born: 11 January 1894; Parkside, South Australia
- Died: 10 December 1958 (aged 64); Little Bay, New South Wales
- Original team: North Melbourne (VFA)/ Sturt

Playing career^{1}
Years	Club	Games (Goals)
1919–20	Melbourne	20 (19)
- ^{1} Playing statistics correct to the end of 1920.

Eric William Tonkin (11 January 1894 – 10 December 1958) was an Australian rules footballer who played with Melbourne in the Victorian Football League (VFL).
