= Kashi Leuchs =

New Zealand cyclist (born 1978)

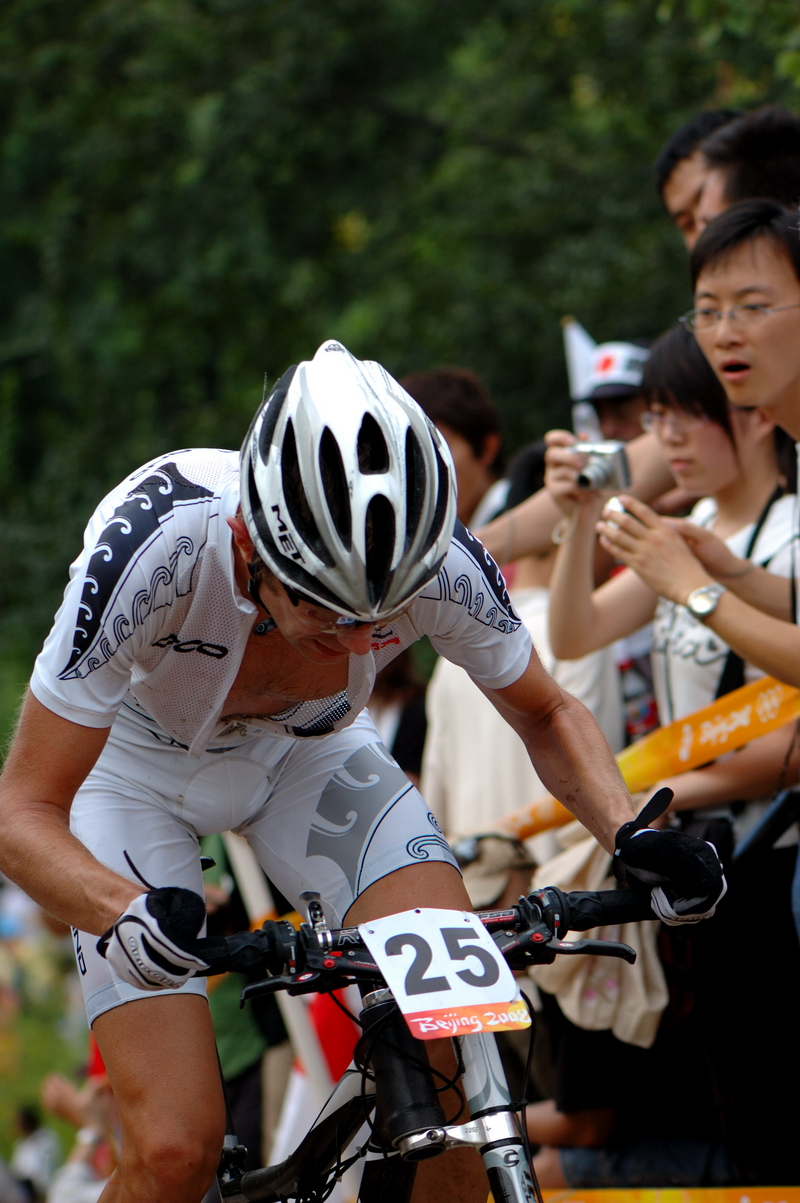
- Leuchs in 2008

Personal information
- Full name: Kashi Ananda Leuchs
- Born: 30 June 1978 (age 48) Dunedin, New Zealand

Cycling career
- Sport: Cycling
- Current team: Retired
- Disciplines: Cross country road racing
- Role: Rider

Kashi Ananda Leuchs (born 30 June 1978) from Dunedin, New Zealand, is a former world class cross country mountain biker who represented New Zealand in mountain biking at the 2000 Olympic Games in Sydney, the 2004 games in Athens and the 2008 Games in Beijing. He also competed in the 2002 and 2006 Commonwealth Games, both in mountain biking and road racing finishing fourth in the 2002 Mountain Bike Cross Country.

In July 2006, Leuchs won the fourth marathon event of the 2006 Mountain Bike World Cup, held at Val Thorens in France.

He currently owns and runs Black Seal Imports, a company importing and distributing Yeti Cycles, Urge Bike and Brake Authority Products in New Zealand.
