= Enrico Franzoi =

Italian cyclist

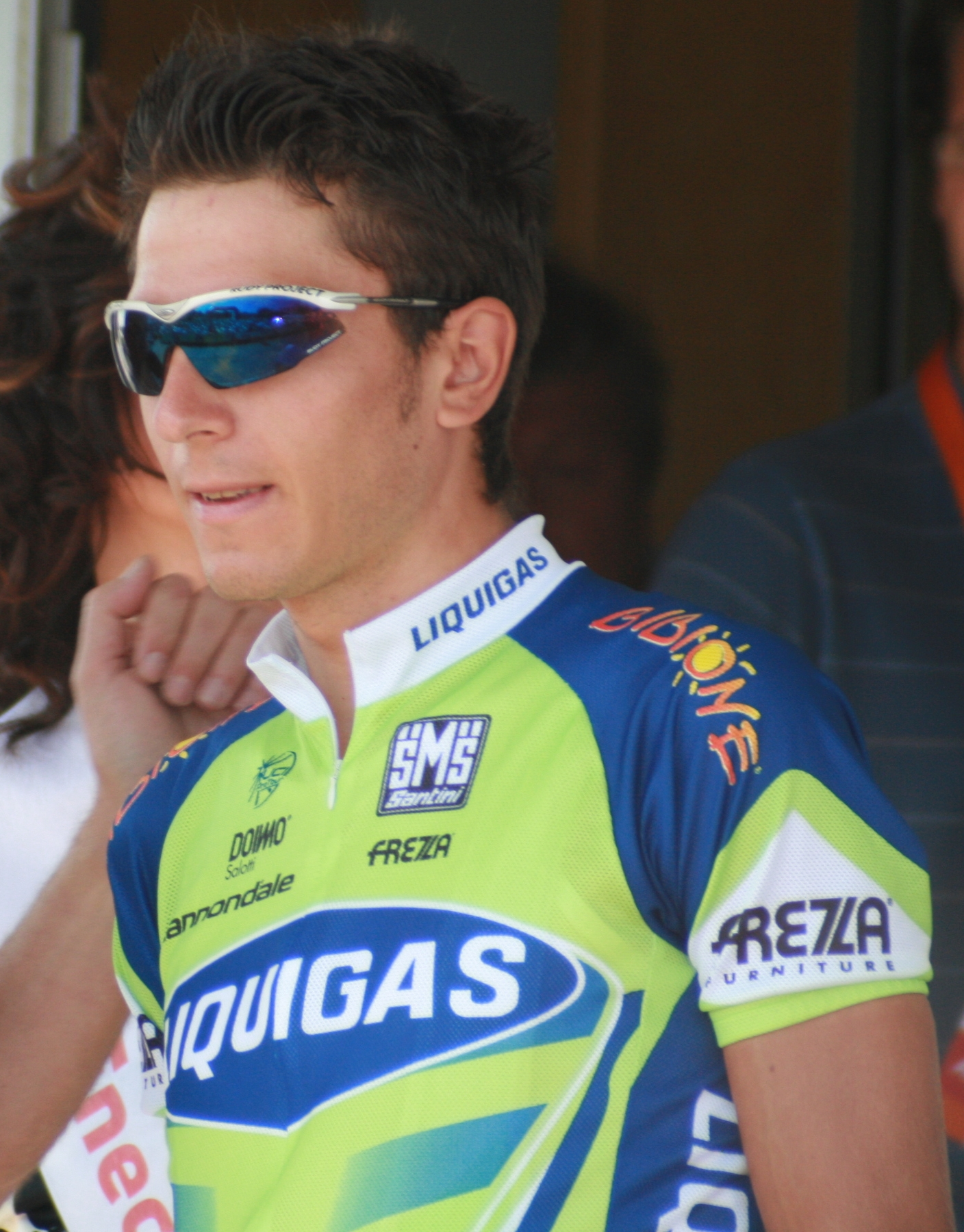

Personal information
- Full name: Enrico Franzoi
- Nickname: Franzo
- Born: 8 August 1982 (age 44) Mestre, Italy
- Height: 1.78 m (5 ft 10 in)
- Weight: 70 kg (154 lb)

Cycling career
- Sport: Cycling
- Current team: ASD Salese
- Disciplines: Road; Cyclo-cross; Mountain biking
- Role: Rider

Amateur teams
- 2016–2018: Damil GT Trevisan
- 2020–: ASD Salese

Professional teams
- 2005–2007: Lampre–Caffita
- 2008–2009: Liquigas
- 2010–2011: BKCP–Powerplus
- 2012: Miche–Guerciotti
- 2014: Marchiol–Emisfero

Major wins
- Cyclo-cross National Championships (2005, 2006, 2007, 2009)
Medal record
Representing Italy
Men's cyclo-cross
World Championships
Gold medal – first place	2003 Monopoli	Under-23
Bronze medal – third place	2007 Hooglede-Gits	Elite

Enrico Franzoi (born 8 August 1982 in Mestre) is an Italian professional cyclo-cross and road bicycle racer, who currently rides for Italian amateur team ASD Salese. Franzoi was previously a member of UCI ProTeams Lampre–Caffita and Liquigas. Franzoi has won the Italian Cyclo-cross Championships on four occasions – in 2005, 2006, 2007 and 2009.

== Major results ==
=== Cyclo-cross ===
1999–2000
1st National Junior Championships
2000–2001
1st National Under-23 Championships
2001–2002
1st National Under-23 Championships
1st Bassano del Grappa
1st Milan
2002–2003
1st UCI World Under-23 Championships
1st National Under-23 Championships
2003–2004
1st National Under-23 Championships
1st Rovato-Lodetto
2004–2005
1st National Championships
1st Clusone
1st Mogliano Veneto
1st Rovato
1st San Martino Silvelle
2005–2006
1st National Championships
1st Bassano del Grappa
1st Mogliano Veneto
2006–2007
1st National Championships
3rd UCI World Championships
2007–2008
1st Lebbeke
2008–2009
1st National Championships

=== Road ===
2006
9th Overall Three Days of De Panne
2007
8th Paris–Roubaix
2008
1st Stage 1 (TTT) Vuelta a España
5th Kuurne–Brussels–Kuurne
2010
8th Overall Tour Alsace
9th Druivenkoers Overijse
2012
3rd Grand Prix Královéhradeckého kraje
9th Overall Tour of Romania
2014
1st Stage 1a (TTT) Giro del Friuli-Venezia Giulia
