= Erwin Vervecken =

Belgian cyclist (born 1972)

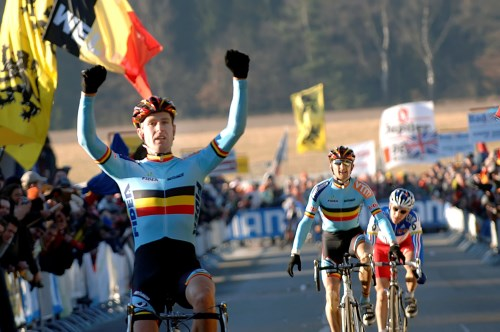

Personal information
- Full name: Erwin Vervecken
- Born: 23 March 1972 (age 54) Herentals, Belgium
- Height: 1.94 m (6 ft 4 in)
- Weight: 78 kg (172 lb)

Cycling career
- Sport: Cycling
- Current team: Retired
- Discipline: Cyclo-cross
- Role: Rider

Professional teams
- 1995–2001: Espace Card-Record Bank
- 2002–2008: Spaarselect
- 2009: Revor-Jartazi

Major wins
- Cyclo-cross World Championships (2001, 2006, 2007) Trophy (2000–01, 2001–02)
Medal record
Men's cyclo-cross
Representing Belgium
World Championships
Gold medal – first place	2001 Tábor	Elite
Gold medal – first place	2006 Zeddam	Elite
Gold medal – first place	2007 Hooglede-Gits	Elite
Silver medal – second place	1998 Middelfart	Elite
Silver medal – second place	1999 Poprad	Elite
Silver medal – second place	2005 Sankt Wendel	Elite
Bronze medal – third place	1994 Koksijde	Elite
Bronze medal – third place	2003 Monopoli	Elite

Erwin Vervecken (born 23 March 1972) is a Belgian former professional cyclist specializing in cyclo-cross. Vervecken was a professional cyclist for 16 seasons (1995–2010) and has been working since his retirement as an external sportive consultant for sport marketing company Golazo, where he helps organize cyclocross and mountain bike races and does the coordination of the UCI Gran Fondo World Series.

== Career highlights ==
He won the UCI Cyclo-cross World Championship in 2001, 2006, and 2007. In 1998, 1999 and 2005 he placed second in the World Championships and in 1994 and 2002, finished third in the World Championships.

== Major results ==
=== Cyclo-cross ===
1990–1991
1st National Junior Championships
1993–1994
Superprestige

2nd Gieten

3rd UCI World Championships
1994–1995
Superprestige

3rd Gavere

1995–1996
1st National Championships
Superprestige

1st Gieten

1996–1997
1st Berlin
UCI World Cup

2nd Koksijde

Superprestige

3rd Gavere
3rd Plzeň

1997–1998
2nd UCI World Championships
2nd National Championships
Superprestige

2nd Gavere

1998–1999
Superprestige

1st Overijse
2nd Hoogstraten

2nd UCI World Championships
1999–2000
2nd National Championships
Gazet van Antwerpen

3rd Niel

2000–2001
1st UCI World Championships
1st Overall Gazet van Antwerpen

1st Niel
1st Rijkevorsel
2nd Oostmalle
3rd Essen
3rd Lille

2nd National Championships
3rd Overall Superprestige

1st Overijse
2nd Diegem
3rd Gavere

UCI World Cup

2nd Leudelange

3rd Loenhout
2001–2002
1st Overall Gazet van Antwerpen

1st Loenhout
2nd Kalmthout
2nd Niel
2nd Lille
3rd Essen

UCI World Cup

1st Nommay
3rd Igorre
3rd Wetzikon

1st Hoogerheide
1st Huijbergen
2nd Overall Superprestige

1st Sint-Michielsgestel
1st Hoogstraten
1st Diegem
2nd Harnes
3rd Ruddervoorde

2nd National Championships
2nd Ardooie
2nd Berlin
2nd Contern
2nd Harderwijk
2nd Koksijde
2nd Tábor
3rd Hofstade
3rd Overijse
3rd Oudenaarde
3rd Woerden
2002–2003
1st Ardooie
2nd Asteasu
2nd Berlin
3rd Overall Superprestige

3rd Vorselaar
3rd Ruddervoorde

3rd UCI World Championships
3rd Koksijde
2003–2004
2nd Hofstade
3rd Overall Superprestige

1st Hoogstraten
2nd Gavere
3rd Diegem
3rd Vorselaar

3rd Overall UCI World Cup

3rd Koksijde
3rd Nommay
3rd Pijnacker

3rd Berlin
2004–2005
Superprestige

1st Hoogstraten
1st Diegem
3rd Gavere

2nd UCI World Championships
2nd Overijse
2nd Kalmthout
2nd Woerden
3rd Overall UCI World Cup

1st Koksijde
2nd Hofstade
3rd Tábor
3rd Wetzikon
3rd Aigle

3rd Overall Gazet van Antwerpen

2nd Niel
3rd Loenhout

3rd Hooglede-Gits
3rd Huijbergen
2005–2006
1st UCI World Championships
UCI World Cup

1st Hoogerheide
2nd Hofstade
2nd Hoogleide-Gits
2nd Milan

1st Eernegem
1st Roubaix
Superprestige

2nd Hoogstraten
3rd Diegem

2nd National Championships
2nd Surhuisterveen
2nd Woerden
3rd Overall Gazet van Antwerpen

2nd Lille
3rd Oostmalle

3rd Overijse
2006–2007
1st UCI World Championships
UCI World Cup

1st Hofstade
3rd Aigle
3rd Kalmthout
3rd Tábor
3rd Treviso
3rd Hoogerheide

1st Aalter
2nd Overall Superprestige

2nd Gavere
3rd Hamme
3rd Vorselaar

2nd Ardooie
2nd Roubaix
2nd Zonhoven
Gazet van Antwerpen

3rd Loenhout

3rd Erpe-Mere
3rd Eernegem
3rd Surhuisterveen
2007–2008
1st Roubaix
1st Southampton
1st Woerden
UCI World Cup

2nd Koksijde
3rd Hoogerheide

2nd Zeddam
3rd Erpe-Mere
3rd Harderwijk
2008–2009
UCI World Cup

1st Koksijde
1st Roubaix
3rd Igorre

2nd Marle
Superprestige

3rd Vorselaar

2009–2010
1st Sun Prairie II
2nd Sun Prairie I

=== Road ===
1997
1st Grand Prix François Faber
2001
Tour de Namur

1st Stages 1 & 2

2002
1st Stage 1 Triptyque Ardennais
2004
2nd GP Etienne de Wilde
2006
7th Internationale Wielertrofee Jong Maar Moedig

=== Mountain bike ===
1995
1st Cross-country, National Championships
