= Tom Vannoppen =

Belgian cyclist

Personal information
- Full name: Tom Vannoppen
- Born: 21 December 1978 (age 47) Ham, Belgium

Cycling career
- Sport: Cycling
- Current team: Retired
- Disciplines: Cyclo-cross; Road
- Role: Rider

Professional teams
- 2000: Vlaanderen 2002–Eddy Merckx
- 2002–2003: Palmans–Collstrop
- 2004–2005: Mr. Bookmaker–Palmans–Collstrop
- 2006: Palmans–Collstrop
- 2007: Sunweb–Projob

Tom Vannoppen (born 21 December 1978 in Ham) is a Belgian former cyclist.
