= Davy Commeyne =

Belgian cyclist

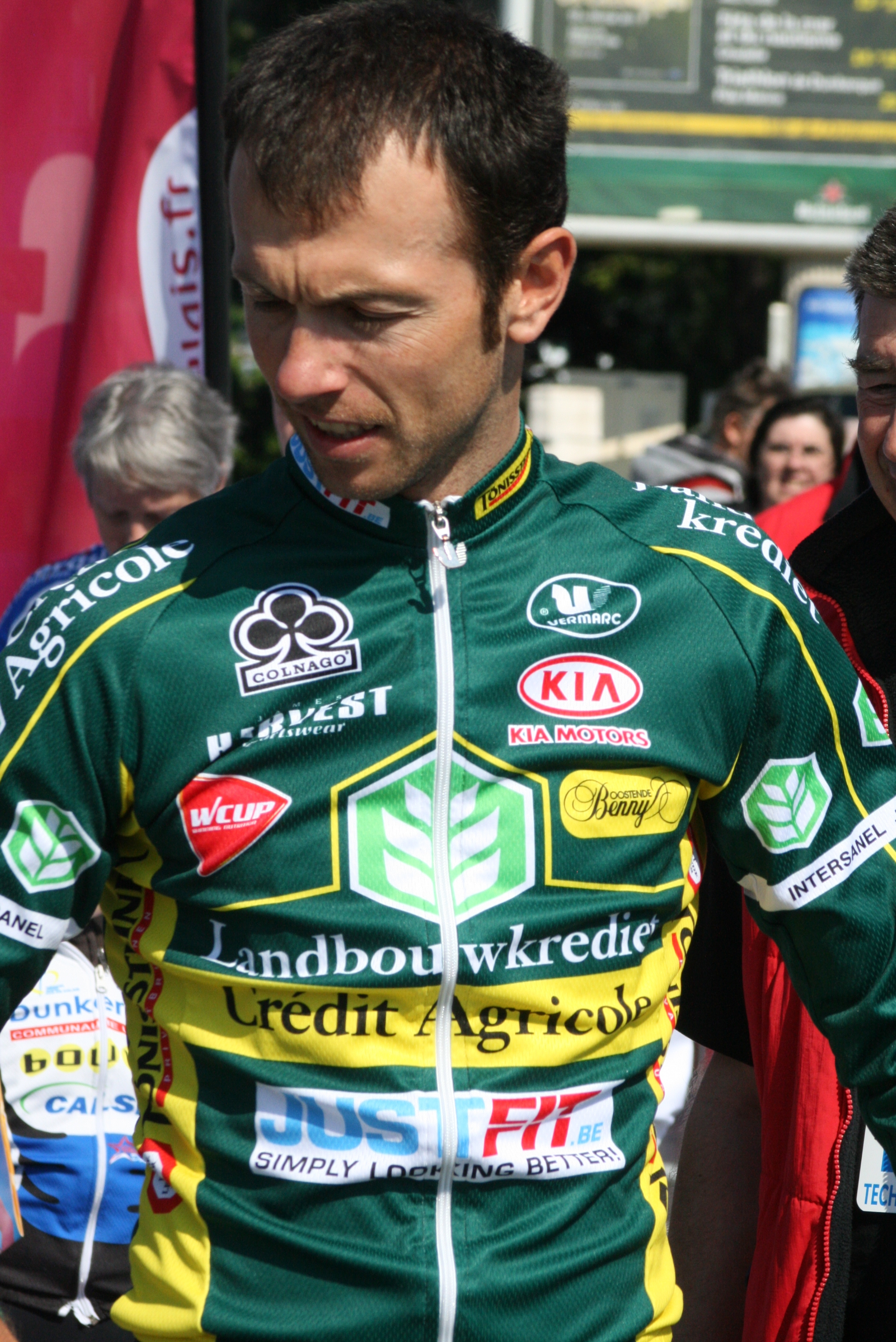

Personal information
- Born: 14 May 1980 (age 46) Roeselare, Belgium

Cycling career
- Sport: Cycling
- Current team: Smartphoto
- Discipline: Road
- Role: Rider

Amateur teams
- 2009: Beveren 2000 Quickstep
- 2014-: Smartphoto

Professional teams
- 2002–2007: Palmans–Collstrop
- 2008: Revor Cycling Team
- 2010–2012: Landbouwkrediet
- 2013: Accent Jobs–Wanty

Davy Commeyne (born 14 May 1980 in Roeselare) is a Belgian cyclist riding for Smartphoto.

== Palmarès ==
1998
1st Ledegem-Kemmel-Ledegem
2000
2nd Omloop Het Nieuwsblad Beloften
2001
1st Spar Arden Challenge

1st stage 1

2008
1st stage 5 Bałtyk–Karkonosze Tour
2009
1st Tweedaagse van Gaverstreek

1st stage 1

1st stage Mi-Août Bretonne
1st Memorial Danny Jonckheere
3rd Triptyque Ardennais

1st stage 3

2011
1st Omloop Mandel-Leie-Schelde
2nd Druivenkoers Overijse
2012
2nd Dwars door het Hageland
3rd Internationale Wielertrofee Jong Maar Moedig
3rd Polynormande
2014
1st stages 2 and 4 Ronde van Vlaams-Brabant
